= 1942 United States House of Representatives elections =

House elections for the 78th U.S. Congress

- November 3, 1942 (Note: Maine held its elections September 14, 1942.)

All 435 seats in the United States House of Representatives 218 seats needed for a majority
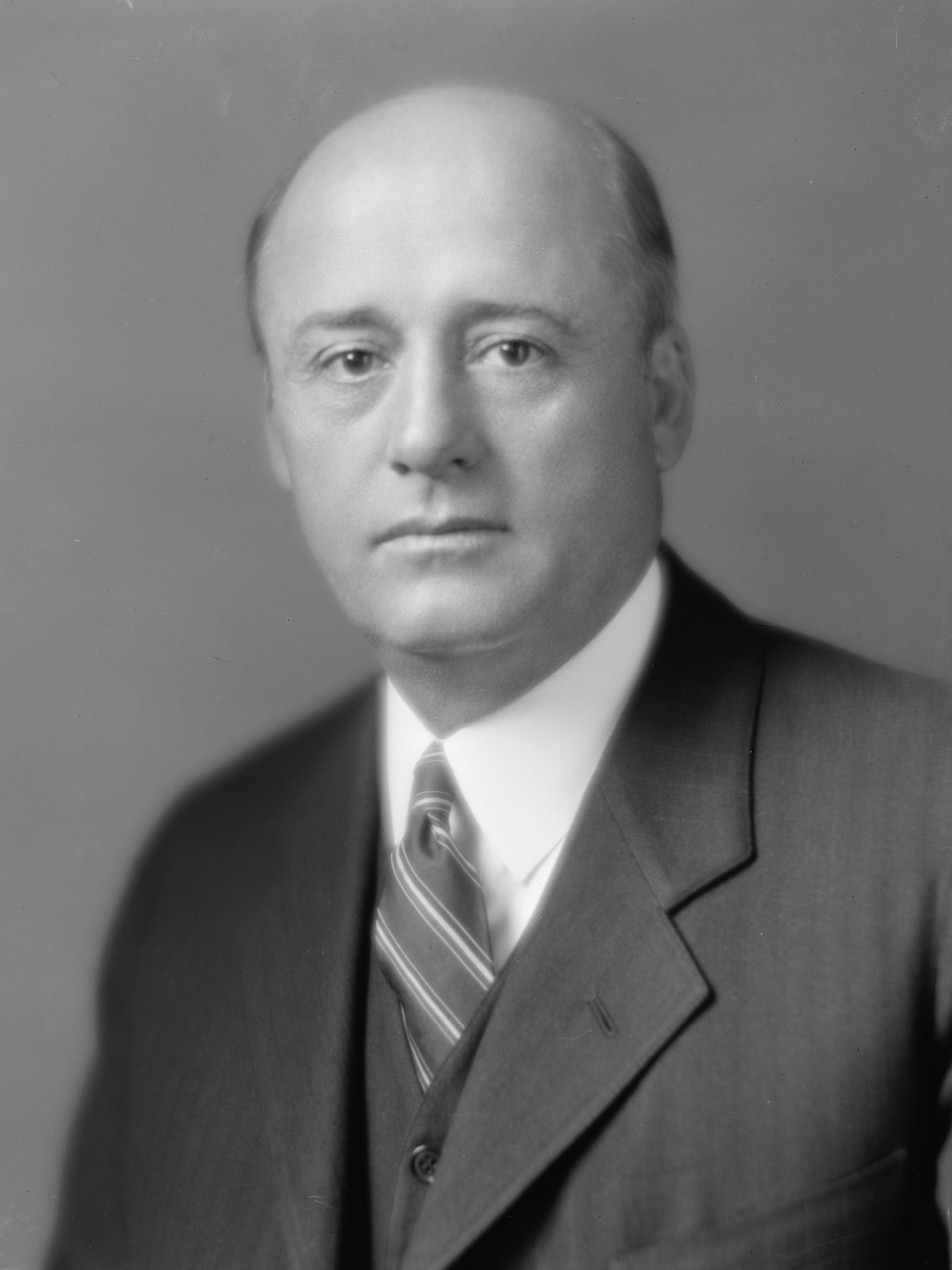

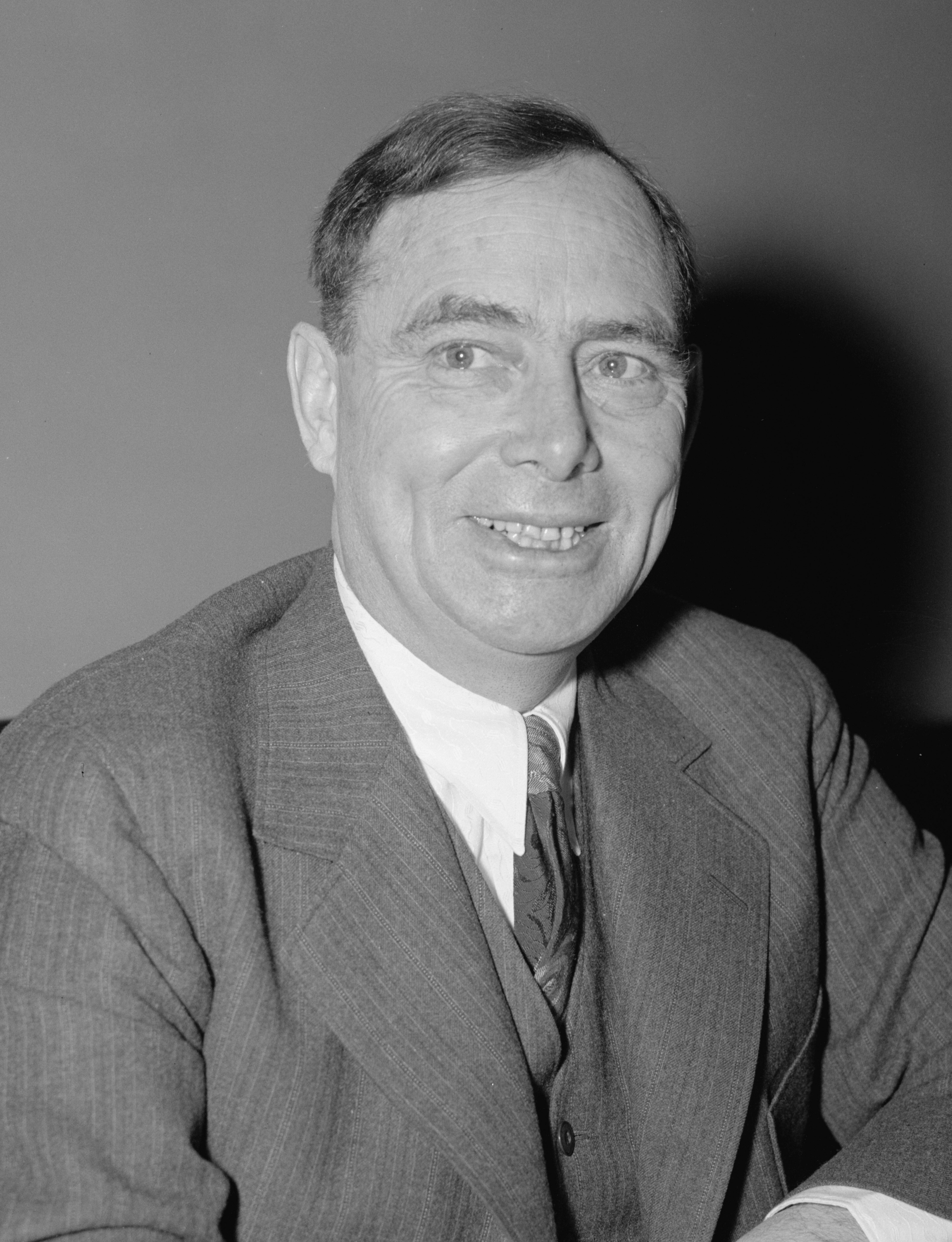
	Majority party	Minority party
Leader	Sam Rayburn	Joseph Martin
Party	Democratic	Republican
Leader since	September 16, 1940	January 3, 1939
Leader's seat	Texas 4th	Massachusetts 14th
Last election	267 seats	162 seats
Seats won	222	209
Seat change	▼45	▲47
Popular vote	13,181,759	14,271,483
Percentage	47.0%	50.8%
Swing	▼4.4pp	▲5.2pp
	Third party	Fourth party
Party	Progressive	Farmer–Labor
Last election	3 seats	1 seat
Seats won	2	1
Seat change	▼1	Steady
Popular vote	185,114	151,684
Percentage	0.7%	0.5%
Swing	▼0.3pp	▼0.1pp
	Fifth party	Sixth party
Party	American Labor	Independent
Last election	1 seat	0 seats
Seats won	1	0
Seat change	Steady	▼1
Popular vote	91,283	67,333
Percentage	0.3%	0.2%
Swing	▼0.4pp	Steady
Speaker before election
Sam Rayburn
Democratic
Elected Speaker
Sam Rayburn
Democratic

The 1942 United States House of Representatives elections were elections for the United States House of Representatives to elect members to serve in the 78th United States Congress. They were held for the most part on November 3, 1942, while Maine held theirs on September 14. This was the first election after the congressional reapportionment based on the 1940 census, and was held in the middle of President Franklin D. Roosevelt's third term. With involvement in World War II, it was the first wartime election in the United States since 1918.

Roosevelt's Democratic Party lost 45 seats to the Republican Party, retaining only a slender majority even though they lost the popular vote by over 1 million votes (3.9%). The election was the second of four times in the 20th century in which either party won the House majority without winning the popular vote, with the other three instances occurring in 1914, 1952, and 1996; Democrats won the House majority without winning the popular vote in the former election, while Republicans did so in the latter two.

This was the most successful congressional election for Republicans since 1930, and the first time since that election cycle that the House GOP actually won the popular vote. The main factor that led to the Republican gains during this election cycle was dissatisfaction with the conduct of America's war effort in World War II.

As of 2026, this was the last time the House of Representatives was made up of five parties. This was also the smallest House majority that the Democrats had up until the 2020 elections. Voter turnout was historically low for the time, which was attributed to the absence of military men and the apathy of workers at war production plants, many of whom had failed to re-register to vote in their new communities or become accustomed to local candidates.

== Overall results ==
↓
222	1	1	2	209
Democratic	AL	FL	P	Republican

Party	Total seats	Seat change	Seat percentage	Vote percentage	Popular vote
Republican	209	▲47	48.0%	50.8%	14,271,483
Democratic	222	▼45	51.0%	47.0%	13,181,759
Progressive	2	▼1	0.4%	0.7%	186,982
Farmer-Labor	1	Steady	0.2%	0.5%	151,684
American Labor	1	Steady	0.2%	0.3%	91,283
Independent	0	▼1	0.0%	0.2%	67,333
Socialist	0	Steady	0.0%	0.1%	37,390
Communist	0	Steady	0.0%	0.1%	29,659
Prohibition	0	Steady	0.0%	0.1%	25,413
Townsend	0	Steady	0.0%	<0.1%	9,843
Socialist Labor	0	Steady	0.0%	<0.1%	1,963
National Recovery	0	Steady	0.0%	<0.1%	1,705
Win the War	0	Steady	0.0%	<0.1%	120
Liberal	0	Steady	0.0%	<0.1%	114
Social Reconstruction	0	Steady	0.0%	<0.1%	114
Independent-Labor	0	Steady	0.0%	<0.1%	75
Others	0	Steady	0.0%	0.1%	17,444
Totals	435	Steady	100.0%	100.0%	28,074,364

Source: Election Statistics - Office of the Clerk

Popular vote
Republican	50.83%
Democratic	46.95%
Progressive	0.67%
Farmer-Labor	0.54%
American Labor	0.33%
Others	0.68%

House seats
Democratic	51.03%
Republican	48.05%
Progressive	0.46%
American Labor	0.23%
Farmer-Labor	0.23%

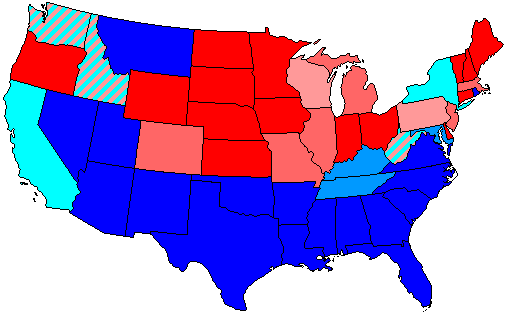
House seats by party holding plurality in state: 80+% to 100% Democratic / 80+% to 100% Republican; 60+% to 80% Democratic / 60+% to 80% Republican; up to 60% Democratic / up to 60% Republican

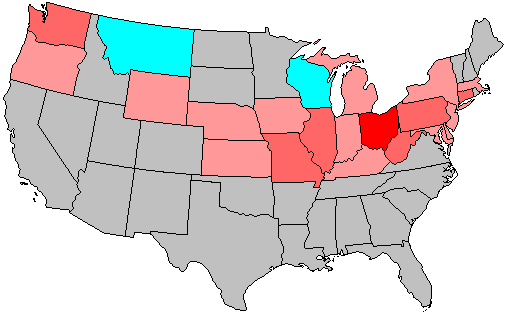
Change in seats: 6+ Democratic gain / 6+ Republican gain; 3–5 Democratic gain / 3–5 Republican gain; 1-2 Democratic gain / 1-2 Republican gain; no net change

== Special elections ==
Some special elections were held throughout the year.

Elections are listed by date and district.

District	Incumbent			This race	
District	Representative	Party	First elected	Results	Candidates
Connecticut 5	J. Joseph Smith	Democratic	1934	Incumbent resigned November 4, 1941. New member elected January 20, 1942. Republican gain. Winner was subsequently re-elected in November.	▌ ✓ Joseph E. Talbot (Republican) 51.9%; ▌John S. Monagan (Democratic) 43.9%; ▌Edward M. Ryan (Independent Progressive) 4.2%
Pennsylvania 12	J. Harold Flannery	Democratic	1936	Incumbent resigned January 3, 1942. New member elected May 19, 1942. Republican gain. Winner was subsequently re-elected in November.	▌ ✓ Thomas B. Miller (Republican) 50.2%; ▌Daniel J. Flood (Democratic) 49.8%
Pennsylvania 33	Joseph A. McArdle	Democratic	1938	Incumbent resigned January 5, 1942. New member elected May 19, 1942. Democratic hold. Winner redistricted to the 32nd district and retired; see below.	▌ ✓ Elmer J. Holland (Democratic) 58.1%; ▌Robert Garland (Republican) 41.9%
California 17	Lee E. Geyer	Democratic	1938	Incumbent died October 11, 1941. New member elected August 25, 1942. Democratic hold. Winner was subsequently re-elected in November.	▌ ✓ Cecil R. King (Democratic) 58.0%; ▌John A. Shidler (Democratic) 19.7%; ▌Harold A. Sparling (Democratic) 11.5%; ▌John T. Rawls (Independent) 8.8%
Iowa 9	Vincent F. Harrington	Democratic	1936	Incumbent resigned September 5, 1942, to serve in the U.S. Army. New member elected November 3, 1942. Republican gain. Winner redistricted to the 8th district and retired; see below.	▌ ✓ Harry E. Narey (Republican) 63.9%; ▌Otto J. Reimers (Democratic) 36.1%
Pennsylvania 11	Patrick J. Boland	Democratic	1930	Incumbent died May 18, 1942. New member elected November 3, 1942. Democratic hold Winner was not a candidate for the full term; see below.	▌ ✓ Veronica Grace Boland (Democratic) 63.9%; Uncontested

== Alabama ==
District	Incumbent			This race	
District	Representative	Party	First elected	Results	Candidates
Alabama 1	Frank W. Boykin	Democratic	1935 (special)	Incumbent re-elected.	▌ ✓ Frank W. Boykin (Democratic); Uncontested
Alabama 2	George M. Grant	Democratic	1938	Incumbent re-elected.	▌ ✓ George M. Grant (Democratic); Uncontested
Alabama 3	Henry B. Steagall	Democratic	1914	Incumbent re-elected.	▌ ✓ Henry B. Steagall (Democratic); Uncontested
Alabama 4	Sam Hobbs	Democratic	1934	Incumbent re-elected.	▌ ✓ Sam Hobbs (Democratic); Uncontested
Alabama 5	Joe Starnes	Democratic	1934	Incumbent re-elected.	▌ ✓ Joe Starnes (Democratic); Uncontested
Alabama 6	Pete Jarman	Democratic	1936	Incumbent re-elected.	▌ ✓ Pete Jarman (Democratic); Uncontested
Alabama 7	Carter Manasco	Democratic	1941 (special)	Incumbent re-elected.	▌ ✓ Carter Manasco (Democratic); Uncontested
Alabama 8	John Sparkman	Democratic	1936	Incumbent re-elected.	▌ ✓ John Sparkman (Democratic); Uncontested
Alabama 9	Luther Patrick	Democratic	1936	Incumbent lost renomination. Democratic hold.	▌ ✓ John P. Newsome (Democratic) 95.6%; ▌C. R. Holliman (Republican) 4.1%; ▌Rob F. Hall (Communist) 0.3%

== Arizona ==
Results by county Harless: 30–40% 40–50% Murdock: 30–40% 40–50%

Arizona received a second representative in reapportionment; it continued to elect both representatives at large rather than drawing districts.

District	Incumbent			This race	
District	Representative	Party	First elected	Results	Candidates
Arizona at-large	John R. Murdock	Democratic	1936	Incumbent re-elected.	▌ ✓ Richard F. Harless (Democratic) 36.6%; ▌John R. Murdock (Democratic) 36.3%; ▌George R. Darnell (Republican) 15.0%; ▌Joseph S. Jencks Jr. (Republican) 11.8%; ▌Morris Graham (Communist) 0.2%
Arizona at-large	None (new district)			New seat. Democratic gain.	▌ ✓ Richard F. Harless (Democratic) 36.6%; ▌John R. Murdock (Democratic) 36.3%; ▌George R. Darnell (Republican) 15.0%; ▌Joseph S. Jencks Jr. (Republican) 11.8%; ▌Morris Graham (Communist) 0.2%

== Arkansas ==
District	Incumbent			This race	
District	Representative	Party	First elected	Results	Candidates
Arkansas 1	Ezekiel C. Gathings	Democratic	1938	Incumbent re-elected.	▌ ✓ Ezekiel C. Gathings (Democratic); Uncontested
Arkansas 2	Wilbur Mills	Democratic	1938	Incumbent re-elected.	▌ ✓ Wilbur Mills (Democratic); Uncontested
Arkansas 3	Clyde T. Ellis	Democratic	1938	Incumbent retired to run for U.S. senator. Democratic hold.	▌ ✓ J. William Fulbright (Democratic); Uncontested
Arkansas 4	William Fadjo Cravens	Democratic	1939 (special)	Incumbent re-elected.	▌ ✓ William Fadjo Cravens (Democratic); Uncontested
Arkansas 5	David D. Terry	Democratic	1933 (special)	Incumbent retired to run for U.S. senator. Democratic hold.	▌ ✓ Brooks Hays (Democratic); Uncontested
Arkansas 6	William F. Norrell	Democratic	1938	Incumbent re-elected.	▌ ✓ William F. Norrell (Democratic); Uncontested
Arkansas 7	Oren Harris	Democratic	1940	Incumbent re-elected.	▌ ✓ Oren Harris (Democratic); Uncontested

== California ==
Three new seats were added in reapportionment, increasing the delegation from 20 to 23 seats. Two of the new seats were won by Democrats, one by a Republican. One Republican and one Democratic incumbents lost re-election, and one vacancy was won by a Republican. Therefore, both Democrats and Republicans increased by 2 seats.

District	Incumbent			This race	
District	Representative	Party	First elected	Results	Candidates
California 1	Clarence F. Lea	Democratic	1916	Incumbent re-elected.	▌ ✓ Clarence F. Lea (Democratic) 93.2%; ▌Albert J. Lima (Communist) 6.8%
California 2	Harry Lane Englebright	Republican	1926	Incumbent re-elected.	▌ ✓ Harry Lane Englebright (Republican); Uncontested
California 3	Frank H. Buck	Democratic	1932	Incumbent died September 17, 1942. Republican gain.	▌ ✓ J. Leroy Johnson (Republican) 54.5%; ▌Joseph B. O'Neill (Democratic) 45.5%
California 4	Thomas Rolph	Republican	1940	Incumbent re-elected.	▌ ✓ Thomas Rolph (Republican) 98.3%; ▌Archie Brown (Write-in) 1.7%
California 5	Richard J. Welch	Republican	1926	Incumbent re-elected.	▌ ✓ Richard J. Welch (Republican) 92.7%; ▌Walter R. Lambert (Communist) 7.3%
California 6	Albert E. Carter	Republican	1924	Incumbent re-elected.	▌ ✓ Albert E. Carter (Republican) 92.6%; ▌Clarence Paton (Communist) 7.3%; ▌William H. Hollander (Write-in) 0.2%
California 7	John H. Tolan	Democratic	1934	Incumbent re-elected.	▌ ✓ John H. Tolan (Democratic); Uncontested
California 8	Jack Z. Anderson	Republican	1938	Incumbent re-elected.	▌ ✓ Jack Z. Anderson (Republican) 99.9%; ▌Elizabeth Nicholas (Write-in) 0.1%
California 9	Bertrand W. Gearhart	Republican	1934	Incumbent re-elected.	▌ ✓ Bertrand W. Gearhart (Republican); Uncontested
California 10	Alfred J. Elliott	Democratic	1937 (special)	Incumbent re-elected.	▌ ✓ Alfred J. Elliott (Democratic); Uncontested
California 11	None (new district)			New seat. Democratic gain.	▌ ✓ George E. Outland (Democratic) 50.7%; ▌A. J. Dingeman (Republican) 49.3%
California 12	Jerry Voorhis	Democratic	1936	Incumbent re-elected.	▌ ✓ Jerry Voorhis (Democratic) 56.8%; ▌Robert P. "Bob" Shuler (Republican) 43.2%
California 13	Charles Kramer	Democratic	1932	Incumbent lost re-election. Republican gain.	▌ ✓ Norris Poulson (Republican) 49.5%; ▌Charles Kramer (Democratic) 42.4%; ▌Calvert S. Wilson (Townsend) 8.1%
California 14	Thomas F. Ford	Democratic	1932	Incumbent re-elected.	▌ ✓ Thomas F. Ford (Democratic) 67.0%; ▌Herbert L. Herberts (Republican) 33.0%
California 15	John M. Costello	Democratic	1934	Incumbent re-elected.	▌ ✓ John M. Costello (Democratic) 86.2%; ▌B. Tarkington Dowden (Prohibition) 9.9%; ▌Philip Gardner (Communist) 3.9%
California 16	Leland M. Ford	Republican	1938	Incumbent lost re-election. Democratic gain.	▌ ✓ Will Rogers Jr. (Democratic) 53.7%; ▌Leland M. Ford (Republican) 45.4%; ▌Allen L. Ryan (Communist) 0.9%
California 17	Cecil R. King	Democratic	1942 (special)	Incumbent re-elected.	▌ ✓ Cecil R. King (Democratic); Uncontested
California 18	William Ward Johnson	Republican	1940	Incumbent re-elected.	▌ ✓ William Ward Johnson (Republican) 56.8%; ▌Francis H. Gentry (Democratic) 43.2%
California 19	None (new district)			New seat. Democratic gain.	▌ ✓ Chet Holifield (Democratic) 63.1%; ▌Carlton H. Casjens (Republican) 36.9%
California 20	John Carl Hinshaw; Redistricted from the 11th district	Republican	1938	Incumbent re-elected.	▌ ✓ John Carl Hinshaw (Republican) 48.4%; ▌Joseph O. Donovan (Democratic) 42.9%; ▌Virgil G. Hinshaw (Prohibition) 5.3%; ▌Janie Berle McCarty (Townsend) 2.7%; ▌Orla E. Lair (Communist) 0.6%
California 21	Harry R. Sheppard; Redistricted from the 19th district	Democratic	1936	Incumbent re-elected.	▌ ✓ Harry R. Sheppard (Democratic) 96.6%; ▌Arthur E. Isham (Write-in) 3.4%
California 22	None (new district)			New seat. Republican gain.	▌ ✓ John J. Phillips (Republican) 57.6%; ▌N. E. West (Democratic) 42.4%
California 23	Edouard Izac; Redistricted from the 20th district	Democratic	1936	Incumbent re-elected.	▌ ✓ Edouard Izac (Democratic) 50.5%; ▌James B. Abbey (Republican) 49.5%

== Colorado ==
District	Incumbent			This race	
District	Representative	Party	First elected	Results	Candidates
Colorado 1	Lawrence Lewis	Democratic	1932	Incumbent re-elected.	▌ ✓ Lawrence Lewis (Democratic) 53.4%; ▌Olaf S. Jacobson (Republican) 46.0%; ▌Ward Rodgers (Socialist) 0.6%
Colorado 2	William S. Hill	Republican	1940	Incumbent re-elected.	▌ ✓ William S. Hill (Republican) 67.7%; ▌Julian E. Hall (Democratic) 31.7%; ▌William E. Randall (Socialist) 0.6%
Colorado 3	John Chenoweth	Republican	1940	Incumbent re-elected.	▌ ✓ John Chenoweth (Republican) 62.7%; ▌J. C. Jarrett (Democratic) 37.3%
Colorado 4	Robert F. Rockwell	Republican	1941 (special)	Incumbent re-elected.	▌ ✓ Robert F. Rockwell (Republican) 58.8%; ▌Elizabeth E. Pellet (Democratic) 41.2%

== Connecticut ==
District	Incumbent			This race	
District	Representative	Party	First elected	Results	Candidates
Connecticut 1	Herman P. Kopplemann	Democratic	1940	Incumbent lost re-election. Republican gain.	▌ ✓ William J. Miller (Republican) 51.4%; ▌Herman P. Kopplemann (Democratic) 48.6%
Connecticut 2	William J. Fitzgerald	Democratic	1940	Incumbent lost re-election. Republican gain.	▌ ✓ John D. McWilliams (Republican) 51.4%; ▌William J. Fitzgerald (Democratic) 48.6%
Connecticut 3	James A. Shanley	Democratic	1934	Incumbent lost re-election. Republican gain.	▌ ✓ Ranulf Compton (Republican) 51.7%; ▌James A. Shanley (Democratic) 48.3%
Connecticut 4	Le Roy D. Downs	Democratic	1940	Incumbent lost re-election. Republican gain.	▌ ✓ Clare Boothe Luce (Republican) 46.2%; ▌Le Roy D. Downs (Democratic) 41.9%; ▌David Mansell (Socialist) 11.3%; ▌Lester P. Barlow (Socialist Labor) 0.7%
Connecticut 5	Joseph E. Talbot	Republican	1942 (special)	Incumbent re-elected.	▌ ✓ Joseph E. Talbot (Republican) 53.6%; ▌William A. Patten (Democratic) 43.7%; ▌Edward M. Ryan (Progressive) 2.8%
Connecticut at-large	Lucien J. Maciora	Democratic	1940	Incumbent lost re-election. Republican gain.	▌ ✓ B. J. Monkiewicz (Republican) 49.8%; ▌Lucien J. Maciora (Democratic) 45.3%; ▌John W. Ring (Socialist) 4.9%

== Delaware ==
District	Incumbent			This race	
District	Representative	Party	First elected	Results	Candidates
Delaware at-large	Philip A. Traynor	Democratic	1940	Incumbent lost re-election. Republican gain.	▌ ✓ Earle D. Willey (Republican) 53.6%; ▌Philip A. Traynor (Democratic) 45.8%; ▌Charles A. Kirk (Prohibition) 0.7%

== Florida ==
Florida received a 6th seat in reapportionment; it added an at-large district to its 5 districts rather than redrawing them.

District	Incumbent			This race	
District	Representative	Party	First elected	Results	Candidates
Florida 1	J. Hardin Peterson	Democratic	1932	Incumbent re-elected.	▌ ✓ J. Hardin Peterson (Democratic); Uncontested
Florida 2	Robert A. Green	Democratic	1932	Incumbent ran in the at-large district Democratic hold.	▌ ✓ Emory H. Price (Democratic); Uncontested
Florida 3	Bob Sikes	Democratic	1940	Incumbent re-elected.	▌ ✓ Bob Sikes (Democratic); Uncontested
Florida 4	Pat Cannon	Democratic	1938	Incumbent re-elected.	▌ ✓ Pat Cannon (Democratic) 81.4%; ▌Bert Leigh Acker (Republican) 18.6%
Florida 5	Joe Hendricks	Democratic	1936	Incumbent re-elected.	▌ ✓ Joe Hendricks (Democratic) 70.9%; ▌Emory Akerman (Republican) 29.1%
Florida at-large	None (new district)			New seat. Democratic gain.	▌ ✓ Robert A. Green (Democratic); Uncontested

== Georgia ==
District	Incumbent			This race	
District	Representative	Party	First elected	Results	Candidates
Georgia 1	Hugh Peterson	Democratic	1934	Incumbent re-elected.	▌ ✓ Hugh Peterson (Democratic) 98.2%; ▌H. W. Sheppard (Independent) 1.8%
Georgia 2	Edward E. Cox	Democratic	1924	Incumbent re-elected.	▌ ✓ Edward E. Cox (Democratic) 100.0%; ▌Joe Baker (Independent) 0.03%
Georgia 3	Stephen Pace	Democratic	1936	Incumbent re-elected.	▌ ✓ Stephen Pace (Democratic); Uncontested
Georgia 4	Albert Sidney Camp	Democratic	1939 (special)	Incumbent re-elected.	▌ ✓ Albert Sidney Camp (Democratic) 100.0%; ▌Roscoe Pickett (Independent) 0.04%
Georgia 5	Robert Ramspeck	Democratic	1929 (special)	Incumbent re-elected.	▌ ✓ Robert Ramspeck (Democratic) 96.0%; ▌Henry A. Alexander (Republican) 4.0%
Georgia 6	Carl Vinson	Democratic	1914	Incumbent re-elected.	▌ ✓ Carl Vinson (Democratic); Uncontested
Georgia 7	Malcolm C. Tarver	Democratic	1926	Incumbent re-elected.	▌ ✓ Malcolm C. Tarver (Democratic); Uncontested
Georgia 8	John S. Gibson	Democratic	1940	Incumbent re-elected.	▌ ✓ John S. Gibson (Democratic); Uncontested
Georgia 9	B. Frank Whelchel	Democratic	1934	Incumbent re-elected.	▌ ✓ B. Frank Whelchel (Democratic) 71.0%; ▌Roscoe Pickett (Independent) 29.0%
Georgia 10	Paul Brown	Democratic	1933 (special)	Incumbent re-elected.	▌ ✓ Paul Brown (Democratic); Uncontested

== Idaho ==
District	Incumbent			This race	
District	Representative	Party	First elected	Results	Candidates
Idaho 1	Compton I. White	Democratic	1932	Incumbent re-elected.	▌ ✓ Compton I. White (Democratic) 54.1%; ▌H. C. Baldridge (Republican) 45.9%
Idaho 2	Henry Dworshak	Republican	1938	Incumbent re-elected.	▌ ✓ Henry Dworshak (Republican) 54.8%; ▌Ira H. Masters (Democratic) 45.2%

== Illinois ==
Illinois was reapportioned from 27 representatives to 26; it went from electing 2 at-large representatives to 1 without redrawing the other districts.

District	Incumbent			This race	
District	Representative	Party	First elected	Results	Candidates
Illinois 1	Arthur W. Mitchell	Democratic	1934	Incumbent retired. Democratic hold.	▌ ✓ William L. Dawson (Democratic) 52.8%; ▌William E. King (Republican) 47.2%
Illinois 2	Raymond S. McKeough	Democratic	1934	Incumbent retired to run for U.S. senator. Democratic hold.	▌ ✓ William A. Rowan (Democratic) 50.8%; ▌Thomas J. Downs (Republican) 49.2%
Illinois 3	Edward A. Kelly	Democratic	1930	Incumbent lost re-election. Republican gain.	▌ ✓ Fred E. Busbey (Republican) 51.3%; ▌Edward A. Kelly (Democratic) 48.7%
Illinois 4	Harry P. Beam	Democratic	1930	Incumbent retired to become judge of municipal court of Chicago. Democratic hold.	▌ ✓ Martin Gorski (Democratic) 78.7%; ▌Arthur J. Rutshaw (Republican) 21.3%
Illinois 5	Adolph J. Sabath	Democratic	1906	Incumbent re-elected.	▌ ✓ Adolph J. Sabath (Democratic) 72.2%; ▌Clem Graver (Republican) 27.8%
Illinois 6	A. F. Maciejewski	Democratic	1938	Incumbent retired. Democratic hold.	▌ ✓ Thomas J. O'Brien (Democratic) 57.4%; ▌Raymond E. Trafelet (Republican) 42.6%
Illinois 7	Leonard W. Schuetz	Democratic	1930	Incumbent re-elected.	▌ ✓ Leonard W. Schuetz (Democratic) 50.3%; ▌James C. Moreland (Republican) 49.7%
Illinois 8	Leo Kocialkowski	Democratic	1932	Incumbent lost renomination. Democratic hold.	▌ ✓ Thomas S. Gordon (Democratic) 78.8%; ▌Rena E. Pikiel (Republican) 21.2%
Illinois 9	Charles S. Dewey	Republican	1940	Incumbent re-elected.	▌ ✓ Charles S. Dewey (Republican) 51.3%; ▌Irwin N. Walker (Democratic) 48.7%
Illinois 10	George A. Paddock	Republican	1940	Incumbent lost renomination. Republican hold.	▌ ✓ Ralph E. Church (Republican) 63.0%; ▌Jack Bairstow (Democratic) 37.0%
Illinois 11	Chauncey W. Reed	Republican	1934	Incumbent re-elected.	▌ ✓ Chauncey W. Reed (Republican) 71.0%; ▌Joseph S. Perry (Democratic) 29.0%
Illinois 12	Noah M. Mason	Republican	1936	Incumbent re-elected.	▌ ✓ Noah M. Mason (Republican) 71.4%; ▌Tony R. Berrettini (Democratic) 28.6%
Illinois 13	Leo E. Allen	Republican	1932	Incumbent re-elected.	▌ ✓ Leo E. Allen (Republican) 79.4%; ▌Michael M. Kinney (Democratic) 20.6%
Illinois 14	Anton J. Johnson	Republican	1938	Incumbent re-elected.	▌ ✓ Anton J. Johnson (Republican) 59.3%; ▌Robert M. Harper (Democratic) 40.7%
Illinois 15	Robert B. Chiperfield	Republican	1938	Incumbent re-elected.	▌ ✓ Robert B. Chiperfield (Republican) 62.1%; ▌Montgomery B. Carrott (Democratic) 37.9%
Illinois 16	Everett Dirksen	Republican	1932	Incumbent re-elected.	▌ ✓ Everett Dirksen (Republican) 68.8%; ▌James D. Carrigan (Democratic) 31.2%
Illinois 17	Leslie C. Arends	Republican	1934	Incumbent re-elected.	▌ ✓ Leslie C. Arends (Republican) 72.4%; ▌Frank Gillespie (Democratic) 27.6%
Illinois 18	Jessie Sumner	Republican	1938	Incumbent re-elected.	▌ ✓ Jessie Sumner (Republican) 62.4%; ▌Fred E. Butcher (Democratic) 37.6%
Illinois 19	William H. Wheat	Republican	1938	Incumbent re-elected.	▌ ✓ William H. Wheat (Republican) 57.3%; ▌Alfred D. Huston (Democratic) 42.7%
Illinois 20	James M. Barnes	Democratic	1938	Incumbent lost re-election. Republican gain.	▌ ✓ Sid Simpson (Republican) 51.0%; ▌James M. Barnes (Democratic) 49.0%
Illinois 21	George Evan Howell	Republican	1940	Incumbent re-elected.	▌ ✓ George Evan Howell (Republican) 58.1%; ▌William P. Roberts (Democratic) 41.9%
Illinois 22	Edwin M. Schaefer	Democratic	1932	Incumbent retired. Republican gain.	▌ ✓ Calvin D. Johnson (Republican) 55.7%; ▌Harry C. Odum (Democratic) 44.3%
Illinois 23	Laurence F. Arnold	Democratic	1936	Incumbent lost re-election. Republican gain.	▌ ✓ Charles W. Vursell (Republican) 52.7%; ▌Laurence F. Arnold (Democratic) 47.3%
Illinois 24	James V. Heidinger	Republican	1940	Incumbent re-elected.	▌ ✓ James V. Heidinger (Republican) 58.4%; ▌Leroy Barham (Democratic) 41.6%
Illinois 25	C. W. Bishop	Republican	1940	Incumbent re-elected.	▌ ✓ C. W. Bishop (Republican) 55.1%; ▌Kent E. Keller (Democratic) 44.9%
Illinois at-large	Stephen A. Day	Republican	1940	Incumbent re-elected.	▌ ✓ Stephen A. Day (Republican) 51.3%; ▌Benjamin S. Adamowski (Democratic) 48.3%; ▌Elizabeth Stephens Carr (Prohibition) 0.4%
Illinois at-large	William Stratton	Republican	1940	Incumbent retired to run for Illinois Treasurer. Republican loss.	▌ ✓ Stephen A. Day (Republican) 51.3%; ▌Benjamin S. Adamowski (Democratic) 48.3%; ▌Elizabeth Stephens Carr (Prohibition) 0.4%

== Indiana ==
Indiana was redrawn from 12 districts to 11 after reapportionment; most of the districts underwent minor boundary changes, and the old 11th district was divided up, distributing Madison County to the 5th, Hancock County to the 10th, and consolidating the parts of Marion County in the old 11th and Indianapolis-based 12th into a new 11th. This forced incumbents William Larrabee and Raymond S. Springer to run against each other in a district drawn mainly from Springer's old district.

District	Incumbent			This race	
District	Representative	Party	First elected	Results	Candidates
Indiana 1	William T. Schulte	Democratic	1932	Incumbent lost renomination. Democratic hold.	▌ ✓ Ray Madden (Democratic) 53.6%; ▌Samuel W. Cullison (Republican) 46.4%
Indiana 2	Charles A. Halleck	Republican	1935 (special)	Incumbent re-elected.	▌ ✓ Charles A. Halleck (Republican) 61.2%; ▌Emmett Ferguson (Democratic) 38.8%
Indiana 3	Robert A. Grant	Republican	1938	Incumbent re-elected.	▌ ✓ Robert A. Grant (Republican) 55.2%; ▌Lewis J. Murphy (Democratic) 44.8%
Indiana 4	George W. Gillie	Republican	1938	Incumbent re-elected.	▌ ✓ George W. Gillie (Republican) 61.0%; ▌Samuel C. Cleland (Democratic) 39.0%
Indiana 5	Forest Harness	Republican	1938	Incumbent re-elected.	▌ ✓ Forest Harness (Republican) 55.7%; ▌Edward C. Hays (Democratic) 44.3%
Indiana 6	Noble J. Johnson	Republican	1938	Incumbent re-elected.	▌ ✓ Noble J. Johnson (Republican) 58.1%; ▌Floyd I. McMurray (Democratic) 41.9%
Indiana 7	Gerald W. Landis	Republican	1938	Incumbent re-elected.	▌ ✓ Gerald W. Landis (Republican) 56.9%; ▌O. A. Noland (Democratic) 43.1%
Indiana 8	John W. Boehne Jr.	Democratic	1930	Incumbent lost re-election. Republican gain.	▌ ✓ Charles M. La Follette (Republican) 53.7%; ▌John W. Boehne Jr. (Democratic) 46.3%
Indiana 9	Earl Wilson	Republican	1940	Incumbent re-elected.	▌ ✓ Earl Wilson (Republican) 55.9%; ▌Roy Huckleberry (Democratic) 44.1%
Indiana 10	Raymond S. Springer	Republican	1938	Incumbent re-elected.	▌ ✓ Raymond S. Springer (Republican) 57.4%; ▌William Larrabee (Democratic) 42.6%
Indiana 10	William Larrabee; Redistricted from the 11th district	Democratic	1930	Incumbent lost re-election. Democratic loss.	▌ ✓ Raymond S. Springer (Republican) 57.4%; ▌William Larrabee (Democratic) 42.6%
Indiana 11	Louis Ludlow; Redistricted from the 12th district	Democratic	1928	Incumbent re-elected.	▌ ✓ Louis Ludlow (Democratic) 50.3%; ▌Howard M. Meyer (Republican) 49.7%

== Iowa ==
Iowa was redistricted from 9 to 8 districts, with the most substantial changes being merging the 2nd, 3rd, and 4th districts in northeastern Iowa down to 2 districts.

District	Incumbent			This race	
District	Representative	Party	First elected	Results	Candidates
Iowa 1	Thomas E. Martin	Republican	1938	Incumbent re-elected.	▌ ✓ Thomas E. Martin (Republican) 61.4%; ▌Vern W. Nall (Democratic) 36.7%; ▌John A. Huglin (National Recovery) 1.9%
Iowa 2	William S. Jacobsen	Democratic	1936	Incumbent lost re-election. Democratic loss.	▌ ✓ Henry O. Talle (Republican) 57.4%; ▌William S. Jacobsen (Democratic) 42.6%
Iowa 2	Henry O. Talle; Redistricted from the 4th district	Republican	1938	Incumbent re-elected.	▌ ✓ Henry O. Talle (Republican) 57.4%; ▌William S. Jacobsen (Democratic) 42.6%
Iowa 3	John W. Gwynne	Republican	1934	Incumbent re-elected.	▌ ✓ John W. Gwynne (Republican) 60.7%; ▌William D. Kearney (Democratic) 39.3%
Iowa 4	Karl M. LeCompte; Redistricted from the 5th district	Republican	1938	Incumbent re-elected.	▌ ✓ Karl M. LeCompte (Republican) 64.5%; ▌Thomas L. Curran (Democratic) 35.5%
Iowa 5	Paul Cunningham; Redistricted from the 6th district	Republican	1940	Incumbent re-elected.	▌ ✓ Paul Cunningham (Republican) 63.2%; ▌E. Frank Fox (Democratic) 36.8%
Iowa 6	Fred C. Gilchrist; Redistricted from the 8th district	Republican	1930	Incumbent re-elected.	▌ ✓ Fred C. Gilchrist (Republican) 60.3%; ▌Edward Breen (Democratic) 39.7%
Iowa 7	Ben F. Jensen	Republican	1938	Incumbent re-elected.	▌ ✓ Ben F. Jensen (Republican) 64.2%; ▌Jess Alton (Democratic) 35.8%
Iowa 8	Vincent F. Harrington; Redistricted from the 9th district	Democratic	1936	Incumbent resigned to serve in the Army Air Corps. Republican gain.	▌ ✓ Charles B. Hoeven (Republican) 64.6%; ▌Walter T. Mahoney (Democratic) 35.4%

== Kansas ==
Kansas was reapportioned from 7 districts to 6, with the central Kansas 4th district losing territory on its north and gaining most of the old 5th district around Wichita.

District	Incumbent			This race	
District	Representative	Party	First elected	Results	Candidates
Kansas 1	William P. Lambertson	Republican	1928	Incumbent re-elected.	▌ ✓ William P. Lambertson (Republican) 59.2%; ▌John E. Barrett (Democratic) 40.8%
Kansas 2	U. S. Guyer	Republican	1926	Incumbent re-elected.	▌ ✓ U. S. Guyer (Republican) 59.1%; ▌Herbert L. Drake (Democratic) 40.9%
Kansas 3	Thomas D. Winter	Republican	1938	Incumbent re-elected.	▌ ✓ Thomas D. Winter (Republican) 59.8%; ▌William E. Murphy (Democratic) 40.2%
Kansas 4	Edward H. Rees	Republican	1936	Incumbent re-elected.	▌ ✓ Edward H. Rees (Republican) 55.7%; ▌John M. Houston (Democratic) 44.3%
Kansas 4	John M. Houston; Redistricted from the 5th district	Democratic	1934	Incumbent lost re-election. Democratic loss.	▌ ✓ Edward H. Rees (Republican) 55.7%; ▌John M. Houston (Democratic) 44.3%
Kansas 5	Clifford R. Hope; Redistricted from the 7th district	Republican	1926	Incumbent re-elected.	▌ ✓ Clifford R. Hope (Republican) 66.6%; ▌S. S. Alexander (Democratic) 33.4%
Kansas 6	Frank Carlson	Republican	1934	Incumbent re-elected.	▌ ✓ Frank Carlson (Republican) 64.2%; ▌Lud W. Strnad (Democratic) 35.8%

== Kentucky ==
District	Incumbent			This race	
District	Representative	Party	First elected	Results	Candidates
Kentucky 1	Noble Jones Gregory	Democratic	1936	Incumbent re-elected.	▌ ✓ Noble Jones Gregory (Democratic) 67.5%; ▌Walter L. Prince (Republican) 32.5%
Kentucky 2	Beverly M. Vincent	Democratic	1937 (special)	Incumbent re-elected.	▌ ✓ Beverly M. Vincent (Democratic); Uncontested
Kentucky 3	Emmet O'Neal	Democratic	1934	Incumbent re-elected.	▌ ✓ Emmet O'Neal (Democratic) 55.2%; ▌Jouett Ross Todd (Republican) 44.8%
Kentucky 4	Edward W. Creal	Democratic	1935 (special)	Incumbent re-elected.	▌ ✓ Edward W. Creal (Democratic) 55.7%; ▌Don V. Drye (Republican) 44.3%
Kentucky 5	Brent Spence	Democratic	1930	Incumbent re-elected.	▌ ✓ Brent Spence (Democratic) 53.5%; ▌Lewis R. Kimberly (Republican) 34.9%; ▌Ed Wimmer (Independent) 11.0%; ▌Jerome Bihl (Independent) 0.7%
Kentucky 6	Virgil Chapman	Democratic	1930	Incumbent re-elected.	▌ ✓ Virgil Chapman (Democratic); Uncontested
Kentucky 7	Andrew J. May	Democratic	1930	Incumbent re-elected.	▌ ✓ Andrew J. May (Democratic) 50.6%; ▌Elmer E. Gabbard (Republican) 49.4%
Kentucky 8	Joe B. Bates	Democratic	1930	Incumbent re-elected.	▌ ✓ Joe B. Bates (Democratic) 56.0%; ▌F. A. Easterling (Republican) 44.0%
Kentucky 9	John M. Robsion	Republican	1934	Incumbent re-elected.	▌ ✓ John M. Robsion (Republican); Uncontested

== Louisiana ==
District	Incumbent			This race	
District	Representative	Party	First elected	Results	Candidates
Louisiana 1	F. Edward Hébert	Democratic	1940	Incumbent re-elected.	▌ ✓ F. Edward Hébert (Democratic); Uncontested
Louisiana 2	Hale Boggs	Democratic	1940	Incumbent lost renomination. Democratic hold.	▌ ✓ Paul H. Maloney (Democratic); Uncontested
Louisiana 3	James R. Domengeaux	Democratic	1940	Incumbent re-elected.	▌ ✓ James R. Domengeaux (Democratic); Uncontested
Louisiana 4	Overton Brooks	Democratic	1936	Incumbent re-elected.	▌ ✓ Overton Brooks (Democratic); Uncontested
Louisiana 5	Newt V. Mills	Democratic	1936	Incumbent lost renomination. Democratic hold.	▌ ✓ Charles E. McKenzie (Democratic); Uncontested
Louisiana 6	Jared Y. Sanders Jr.	Democratic	1940	Incumbent lost renomination. Democratic hold.	▌ ✓ James H. Morrison (Democratic); Uncontested
Louisiana 7	Vance Plauché	Democratic	1940	Incumbent retired. Democratic hold.	▌ ✓ Henry D. Larcade Jr. (Democratic); Uncontested
Louisiana 8	A. Leonard Allen	Democratic	1936	Incumbent re-elected.	▌ ✓ A. Leonard Allen (Democratic); Uncontested

== Maine ==
District	Incumbent			This race	
District	Representative	Party	First elected	Results	Candidates
Maine 1	James C. Oliver	Republican	1936	Incumbent lost renomination. Republican hold.	▌ ✓ Robert Hale (Republican) 57.0%; ▌Louis J. Brann (Democratic) 43.0%
Maine 2	Margaret Chase Smith	Republican	1940	Incumbent re-elected.	▌ ✓ Margaret Chase Smith (Republican) 67.6%; ▌Bradford D. Redonnett (Democratic) 32.4%
Maine 3	Frank Fellows	Republican	1940	Incumbent re-elected.	▌ ✓ Frank Fellows (Republican); Uncontested

== Maryland ==
District	Incumbent			This race	
District	Representative	Party	First elected	Results	Candidates
Maryland 1	David Jenkins Ward	Democratic	1939 (special)	Incumbent re-elected.	▌ ✓ David Jenkins Ward (Democratic) 55.9%; ▌William H. Lloyd (Republican) 44.1%
Maryland 2	William P. Cole Jr.	Democratic	1930	Incumbent resigned when appointed to the U.S. Customs Court. Democratic hold.	▌ ✓ Harry Streett Baldwin (Democratic) 62.2%; ▌George R. Norris (Republican) 37.8%
Maryland 3	Thomas D'Alesandro Jr.	Democratic	1938	Incumbent re-elected.	▌ ✓ Thomas D'Alesandro Jr. (Democratic) 73.2%; ▌Edward S. Panetti (Republican) 26.8%
Maryland 4	John Ambrose Meyer	Democratic	1940	Incumbent lost renomination. Republican gain.	▌ ✓ Daniel Ellison (Republican) 50.9%; ▌Joseph M. Wyatt (Democratic) 49.1%
Maryland 5	Lansdale Sasscer	Democratic	1939 (special)	Incumbent re-elected.	▌ ✓ Lansdale Sasscer (Democratic) 66.7%; ▌John N. Torvestad (Republican) 33.3%
Maryland 6	Katharine Byron	Democratic	1941 (special)	Incumbent retired. Republican gain.	▌ ✓ J. Glenn Beall (Republican) 59.5%; ▌E. Brooke Lee (Democratic) 40.5%

== Massachusetts ==
Massachusetts was reapportioned from 15 districts down to 14, with the most affected incumbent being Thomas H. Eliot of the former 9th, whose western Boston suburbs were moved into the 10th and 4th while his Cambridge residence was pulled into the more urban 11th, where he was defeated in the primary by James Michael Curley.

District	Incumbent			This race	
District	Representative	Party	First elected	Results	Candidates
Massachusetts 1	Allen T. Treadway	Republican	1912	Incumbent re-elected.	▌ ✓ Allen T. Treadway (Republican) 56.7%; ▌Frank Gurley (Democratic) 40.9%; ▌Charles H. Daniels (Socialist) 2.4%
Massachusetts 2	Charles R. Clason	Republican	1936	Incumbent re-elected.	▌ ✓ Charles R. Clason (Republican) 61.6%; ▌John J. Granfield (Democratic) 38.4%
Massachusetts 3	Joseph E. Casey	Democratic	1934	Incumbent retired to run for U.S. senator. Democratic hold.	▌ ✓ Philip J. Philbin (Democratic) 50.4%; ▌Alfred Woollacott (Republican) 49.6%
Massachusetts 4	Pehr G. Holmes	Republican	1930	Incumbent re-elected.	▌ ✓ Pehr G. Holmes (Republican) 57.2%; ▌John S. Sullivan (Democratic) 42.8%
Massachusetts 5	Edith Nourse Rogers	Republican	1925 (special)	Incumbent re-elected.	▌ ✓ Edith Nourse Rogers (Republican); Uncontested
Massachusetts 6	George J. Bates	Republican	1936	Incumbent re-elected.	▌ ✓ George J. Bates (Republican) 75.3%; ▌James D. Burns (Democratic) 24.7%
Massachusetts 7	Thomas J. Lane	Democratic	1941 (special)	Incumbent re-elected.	▌ ✓ Thomas J. Lane (Democratic); Uncontested
Massachusetts 8	Arthur Daniel Healey	Democratic	1932	Incumbent resigned when appointed to the U.S. District Court for the District of Massachusetts. Republican gain.	▌ ✓ Angier Goodwin (Republican) 56.2%; ▌Frederick T. McDermott (Democratic) 43.8%
Massachusetts 9	Charles L. Gifford; Redistricted from the 15th district	Republican	1922	Incumbent re-elected.	▌ ✓ Charles L. Gifford (Republican) 58.8%; ▌George F. Backus (Democratic) 41.2%
Massachusetts 10	George H. Tinkham	Republican	1914	Incumbent retired. Republican hold.	▌ ✓ Christian Herter (Republican) 51.1%; ▌William A. Carey (Democratic) 48.9%
Massachusetts 11	Thomas A. Flaherty	Democratic	1937 (special)	Incumbent retired. Democratic hold.	▌ ✓ James Michael Curley (Democratic) 69.3%; ▌Vincent Mottola (Republican) 30.7%
Massachusetts 11	Thomas H. Eliot; Redistricted from the 9th district	Democratic	1940	Incumbent lost renomination. Democratic loss.	▌ ✓ James Michael Curley (Democratic) 69.3%; ▌Vincent Mottola (Republican) 30.7%
Massachusetts 12	John W. McCormack	Democratic	1928	Incumbent re-elected.	▌ ✓ John W. McCormack (Democratic) 78.7%; ▌Francis P. O'Neill (Republican) 21.3%
Massachusetts 13	Richard B. Wigglesworth	Republican	1928	Incumbent re-elected.	▌ ✓ Richard B. Wigglesworth (Republican) 59.3%; ▌Francis H. Foy (Democratic) 40.7%
Massachusetts 14	Joseph W. Martin Jr.	Republican	1924	Incumbent re-elected.	▌ ✓ Joseph W. Martin Jr. (Republican) 59.4%; ▌Terrance J. Lomax Jr. (Democratic) 40.6%

== Michigan ==
District	Incumbent			This race	
District	Representative	Party	First elected	Results	Candidates
Michigan 1	Rudolph G. Tenerowicz	Democratic	1938	Incumbent lost renomination. Democratic hold.	▌ ✓ George G. Sadowski (Democratic) 78.0%; ▌John B. Sosnowski (Republican) 22.0%
Michigan 2	Earl C. Michener	Republican	1934	Incumbent re-elected.	▌ ✓ Earl C. Michener (Republican) 63.1%; ▌Redmond M. Burr (Democratic) 36.3%; ▌Adelaide Sewell (Prohibition) 0.6%
Michigan 3	Paul W. Shafer	Republican	1936	Incumbent re-elected.	▌ ✓ Paul W. Shafer (Republican) 65.7%; ▌Harold E. Steinbacher (Democratic) 32.6%; ▌George A. Brown (Prohibition) 1.7%
Michigan 4	Clare Hoffman	Republican	1934	Incumbent re-elected.	▌ ✓ Clare Hoffman (Republican) 68.6%; ▌Dean Morley (Democratic) 30.7%; ▌Ora H. Fox (Prohibition) 0.7%
Michigan 5	Bartel J. Jonkman	Republican	1940	Incumbent re-elected.	▌ ✓ Bartel J. Jonkman (Republican) 54.0%; ▌Herman J. Wierenga (Democratic) 45.0%; ▌Fenno E. Densmore (Prohibition) 1.0%
Michigan 6	William W. Blackney	Republican	1938	Incumbent re-elected.	▌ ✓ William W. Blackney (Republican) 57.6%; ▌David M. Martin (Democratic) 41.6%; ▌Daniel T. Perrine (Prohibition) 0.8%
Michigan 7	Jesse P. Wolcott	Republican	1930	Incumbent re-elected.	▌ ✓ Jesse P. Wolcott (Republican) 67.3%; ▌LeRoy S. Wilson (Democratic) 32.7%
Michigan 8	Fred L. Crawford	Republican	1934	Incumbent re-elected.	▌ ✓ Fred L. Crawford (Republican) 66.9%; ▌Michael J. Hart (Democratic) 32.1%; ▌James L. Hazeldine (Prohibition) 0.9%
Michigan 9	Albert J. Engel	Republican	1934	Incumbent re-elected.	▌ ✓ Albert J. Engel (Republican) 65.4%; ▌Arnold B. Coxhill (Democratic) 34.0%; ▌Alfred T. Halsted (Prohibition) 0.6%
Michigan 10	Roy O. Woodruff	Republican	1920	Incumbent re-elected.	▌ ✓ Roy O. Woodruff (Republican) 60.1%; ▌John E. Morrison (Democratic) 39.3%; ▌Gustav W. Malm (Prohibition) 0.5%
Michigan 11	Frederick Van Ness Bradley	Republican	1938	Incumbent re-elected.	▌ ✓ Frederick Van Ness Bradley (Republican) 58.0%; ▌Paul L. Adams (Democratic) 42.0%
Michigan 12	Frank Eugene Hook	Democratic	1934	Incumbent lost re-election. Republican gain.	▌ ✓ John B. Bennett (Republican) 51.5%; ▌Frank Eugene Hook (Democratic) 45.6%; ▌Andrew Asikainen (Prohibition) 2.9%
Michigan 13	George D. O'Brien	Democratic	1940	Incumbent re-elected.	▌ ✓ George D. O'Brien (Democratic) 51.1%; ▌Clarence J. McLeod (Republican) 48.9%
Michigan 14	Louis C. Rabaut	Democratic	1934	Incumbent re-elected.	▌ ✓ Louis C. Rabaut (Democratic) 58.7%; ▌Claude G. McDonald (Republican) 41.3%
Michigan 15	John Dingell Sr.	Democratic	1932	Incumbent re-elected.	▌ ✓ John Dingell Sr. (Democratic) 64.6%; ▌Ivan L. Bowman (Republican) 35.4%
Michigan 16	John Lesinski Sr.	Democratic	1932	Incumbent re-elected.	▌ ✓ John Lesinski Sr. (Democratic) 58.5%; ▌Robert W. Ford (Republican) 41.5%
Michigan 17	George Anthony Dondero	Republican	1932	Incumbent re-elected.	▌ ✓ George Anthony Dondero (Republican) 56.8%; ▌Dorothy Kemp Roosevelt (Democratic) 43.2%

== Minnesota ==
District	Incumbent			This race	
District	Representative	Party	First elected	Results	Candidates
Minnesota 1	August H. Andresen	Republican	1934	Incumbent re-elected.	▌ ✓ August H. Andresen (Republican) 66.2%; ▌Harold R. Atwood (Democratic) 33.8%
Minnesota 2	Joseph P. O'Hara	Republican	1940	Incumbent re-elected.	▌ ✓ Joseph P. O'Hara (Republican) 70.0%; ▌R. J. Neunsinger (Democratic) 16.2%; ▌Charles D. Peterson (Farmer–Labor) 13.8%
Minnesota 3	Richard P. Gale	Republican	1940	Incumbent re-elected.	▌ ✓ Richard P. Gale (Republican) 49.0%; ▌Charles Munn (Farmer–Labor) 32.9%; ▌William Gallagher (Democratic) 18.1%
Minnesota 4	Melvin Maas	Republican	1934	Incumbent re-elected.	▌ ✓ Melvin Maas (Republican) 65.1%; ▌William Mahoney (Farmer–Labor) 24.2%; ▌Edward K. Delaney (Democratic) 9.8%; ▌Rose Tillotson (Communist) 0.9%
Minnesota 5	Oscar Youngdahl	Republican	1938	Incumbent lost renomination. Republican hold.	▌ ✓ Walter Judd (Republican) 63.8%; ▌Joseph Gilbert (Farmer–Labor) 19.5%; ▌Thomas P. Ryan (Democratic) 16.7%
Minnesota 6	Harold Knutson	Republican	1934	Incumbent re-elected.	▌ ✓ Harold Knutson (Republican) 57.1%; ▌E. Thomas O'Brien (Democratic) 42.6%; ▌Harry O'Brien (Independent) 0.3%; ▌Frank O'Brien (Independent) 0.002%
Minnesota 7	H. Carl Andersen	Republican	1938	Incumbent re-elected.	▌ ✓ H. Carl Andersen (Republican) 54.8%; ▌Theodor S. Slen (Democratic) 24.9%; ▌Francis H. Shoemaker (Farmer–Labor) 20.3%
Minnesota 8	William Alvin Pittenger	Republican	1938	Incumbent re-elected.	▌ ✓ William Alvin Pittenger (Republican) 58.2%; ▌Rudolph Rautio (Farmer–Labor) 24.5%; ▌E. J. Larsen (Democratic) 11.6%; ▌S. B. Ruohoniemi (Democratic) 5.8%
Minnesota 9	Rich T. Buckler	Farmer-Labor	1934	Incumbent retired. Farmer-Labor hold.	▌ ✓ Harold Hagen (Farmer–Labor) 50.4%; ▌John W. Padden (Republican) 49.6%

== Mississippi ==
District	Incumbent			This race	
District	Representative	Party	First elected	Results	Candidates
Mississippi 1	John E. Rankin	Democratic	1920	Incumbent re-elected.	▌ ✓ John E. Rankin (Democratic); Uncontested
Mississippi 2	Jamie Whitten	Democratic	1941 (special)	Incumbent re-elected.	▌ ✓ Jamie Whitten (Democratic); Uncontested
Mississippi 3	William Madison Whittington	Democratic	1924	Incumbent re-elected.	▌ ✓ William Madison Whittington (Democratic); Uncontested
Mississippi 4	Aaron L. Ford	Democratic	1934	Incumbent lost renomination. Democratic hold.	▌ ✓ Thomas Abernethy (Democratic); Uncontested
Mississippi 5	Ross A. Collins	Democratic	1936	Incumbent retired to run for U.S. senator. Democratic hold.	▌ ✓ W. Arthur Winstead (Democratic); Uncontested
Mississippi 6	William M. Colmer	Democratic	1932	Incumbent re-elected.	▌ ✓ William M. Colmer (Democratic); Uncontested
Mississippi 7	Dan R. McGehee	Democratic	1934	Incumbent re-elected.	▌ ✓ Dan R. McGehee (Democratic); Uncontested

== Missouri ==
District	Incumbent			This race	
District	Representative	Party	First elected	Results	Candidates
Missouri 1	Milton A. Romjue	Democratic	1922	Incumbent lost re-election. Republican gain.	▌ ✓ Samuel W. Arnold (Republican) 55.5%; ▌Milton A. Romjue (Democratic) 44.5%
Missouri 2	William L. Nelson	Democratic	1934	Incumbent lost re-election. Republican gain.	▌ ✓ Max Schwabe (Republican) 50.4%; ▌William L. Nelson (Democratic) 49.6%
Missouri 3	Richard M. Duncan	Democratic	1932	Incumbent lost re-election. Republican gain.	▌ ✓ William C. Cole (Republican) 56.4%; ▌Richard M. Duncan (Democratic) 43.6%
Missouri 4	C. Jasper Bell	Democratic	1934	Incumbent re-elected.	▌ ✓ C. Jasper Bell (Democratic) 60.5%; ▌John W. Mitchell (Republican) 39.5%
Missouri 5	Joe Shannon	Democratic	1930	Incumbent retired. Democratic hold.	▌ ✓ Roger C. Slaughter (Democratic) 50.9%; ▌Ralph B. Innis (Republican) 48.9%; ▌W. F. Rinck (Socialist) 0.2%
Missouri 6	Philip A. Bennett	Republican	1940	Incumbent re-elected.	▌ ✓ Philip A. Bennett (Republican) 54.5%; ▌Sam M. Wear (Democratic) 45.5%
Missouri 7	Dewey Short	Republican	1934	Incumbent re-elected.	▌ ✓ Dewey Short (Republican) 63.5%; ▌Ralph C. Max (Democratic) 36.5%
Missouri 8	Clyde Williams	Democratic	1930	Incumbent lost re-election. Republican gain.	▌ ✓ William P. Elmer (Republican) 51.5%; ▌Clyde Williams (Democratic) 48.5%
Missouri 9	Clarence Cannon	Democratic	1922	Incumbent re-elected.	▌ ✓ Clarence Cannon (Democratic) 54.6%; ▌Carl E. Starkloff (Republican) 45.2%; ▌Elmer E. Morrow (Prohibition) 0.3%
Missouri 10	Orville Zimmerman	Democratic	1934	Incumbent re-elected.	▌ ✓ Orville Zimmerman (Democratic) 56.7%; ▌Merrill Spitler (Republican) 43.3%
Missouri 11	John B. Sullivan	Democratic	1940	Incumbent lost re-election. Republican gain.	▌ ✓ Louis E. Miller (Republican) 50.4%; ▌John B. Sullivan (Democratic) 49.6%
Missouri 12	Walter C. Ploeser	Republican	1940	Incumbent re-elected.	▌ ✓ Walter C. Ploeser (Republican) 57.0%; ▌Martin L. Neaf (Democratic) 43.0%
Missouri 13	John J. Cochran	Democratic	1926	Incumbent re-elected.	▌ ✓ John J. Cochran (Democratic) 61.3%; ▌D. E. Horn (Republican) 38.7%

== Montana ==
District	Incumbent			This race	
District	Representative	Party	First elected	Results	Candidates
Montana 1	Jeannette Rankin	Republican	1940	Incumbent retired. Democratic gain.	▌ ✓ Mike Mansfield (Democratic) 59.0%; ▌Howard K. Hazelbaker (Republican) 39.5%; ▌Leverne Hamilton (Socialist) 1.5%
Montana 2	James F. O'Connor	Democratic	1936	Incumbent re-elected.	▌ ✓ James F. O'Connor (Democratic) 52.0%; ▌F. F. Haynes (Republican) 46.4%; ▌Earl McConnell (Socialist) 1.6%

== Nebraska ==
Redistricted from 5 districts down to 4; the 4th and 1st districts were merged into each other, with the other three districts all gaining some territory on the south.

District	Incumbent			This race	
District	Representative	Party	First elected	Results	Candidates
Nebraska 1	Oren S. Copeland	Republican	1940	Incumbent lost renomination. Republican loss.	▌ ✓ Carl Curtis (Republican) 66.6%; ▌Ralph Brooks (Democratic) 30.0%; ▌Claude C. Earley (Independent) 3.4%
Nebraska 1	Carl Curtis; Redistricted from the 4th district	Republican	1938	Incumbent re-elected.	▌ ✓ Carl Curtis (Republican) 66.6%; ▌Ralph Brooks (Democratic) 30.0%; ▌Claude C. Earley (Independent) 3.4%
Nebraska 2	Charles F. McLaughlin	Democratic	1934	Incumbent lost re-election. Republican gain.	▌ ✓ Howard Buffett (Republican) 53.2%; ▌Charles F. McLaughlin (Democratic) 46.8%
Nebraska 3	Karl Stefan	Republican	1934	Incumbent re-elected.	▌ ✓ Karl Stefan (Republican) 66.6%; ▌George Hally (Democratic) 29.3%; ▌Paul Burke (Independent) 4.0%
Nebraska 4	Harry B. Coffee; Redistricted from the 5th district	Democratic	1934	Incumbent retired to run for U.S. senator. Republican gain.	▌ ✓ Arthur L. Miller (Republican) 67.1%; ▌Tom Lanigan (Democratic) 32.9%

== Nevada ==
District	Incumbent			This race	
District	Representative	Party	First elected	Results	Candidates
Nevada at-large	James G. Scrugham	Democratic	1932	Incumbent retired to run for U.S. senator. Democratic hold.	▌ ✓ Maurice J. Sullivan (Democratic) 53.6%; ▌Ernest L. Brooks (Republican) 46.4%

== New Hampshire ==
District	Incumbent			This race	
District	Representative	Party	First elected	Results	Candidates
New Hampshire 1	Arthur B. Jenks	Republican	1938	Incumbent lost renomination. Republican hold.	▌ ✓ Chester E. Merrow (Republican) 52.1%; ▌Thomas A. Murray (Democratic) 47.9%
New Hampshire 2	Foster W. Stearns	Republican	1938	Incumbent re-elected.	▌ ✓ Foster W. Stearns (Republican) 58.4%; ▌Henry J. Proulx (Democratic) 41.6%

== New Jersey ==
District	Incumbent			This race	
District	Representative	Party	First elected	Results	Candidates
New Jersey 1	Charles A. Wolverton	Republican	1926	Incumbent re-elected.	▌ ✓ Charles A. Wolverton (Republican) 61.4%; ▌Ralph W. Wescott (Democratic) 38.1%; ▌Phebe Sharp Baner (Prohibition) 0.5%
New Jersey 2	Elmer H. Wene	Democratic	1940	Incumbent re-elected.	▌ ✓ Elmer H. Wene (Democratic) 53.0%; ▌Benjamin D. Foulois (Republican) 47.0%
New Jersey 3	William H. Sutphin	Democratic	1930	Incumbent lost re-election. Republican gain.	▌ ✓ James C. Auchincloss (Republican) 53.4%; ▌William H. Sutphin (Democratic) 46.6%
New Jersey 4	D. Lane Powers	Republican	1932	Incumbent re-elected.	▌ ✓ D. Lane Powers (Republican) 63.8%; ▌William H. Thompson Jr. (Democratic) 36.0%; ▌William C. Kauffman (Socialist) 0.1%; ▌Manuel Cantor (Communist) 0.06%
New Jersey 5	Charles A. Eaton	Republican	1924	Incumbent re-elected.	▌ ✓ Charles A. Eaton (Republican) 64.7%; ▌J. Ellis Kirkham (Democratic) 34.5%; ▌Charles K. Ely (Prohibition) 0.9%
New Jersey 6	Donald H. McLean	Republican	1932	Incumbent re-elected.	▌ ✓ Donald H. McLean (Republican) 57.8%; ▌George R. Walsh (Democratic) 40.4%; ▌Margaret Cameron Lowe (Prohibition) 1.8%
New Jersey 7	J. Parnell Thomas	Republican	1936	Incumbent re-elected.	▌ ✓ J. Parnell Thomas (Republican) 68.8%; ▌Emil M. Wulster (Democratic) 31.2%
New Jersey 8	Gordon Canfield	Republican	1940	Incumbent re-elected.	▌ ✓ Gordon Canfield (Republican) 66.6%; ▌Irving Abramson (Democratic) 33.0%; ▌Edward Lun (Socialist Labor) 0.3%; ▌Henry George Linke (Independent) 0.09%; ▌Savilla K. Dormida (Prohibition) 0.08%
New Jersey 9	Frank C. Osmers Jr.	Republican	1938	Incumbent retired to serve in the Army. Republican hold.	▌ ✓ Harry Lancaster Towe (Republican) 61.7%; ▌Frank H. Hennessy (Democratic) 38.3%
New Jersey 10	Fred A. Hartley Jr.	Republican	1928	Incumbent re-elected.	▌ ✓ Fred A. Hartley Jr. (Republican) 53.0%; ▌Frederic Bigelow (Democratic) 44.9%; ▌Albert Bowden (Prohibition) 1.6%; ▌James Pica (Socialist) 0.2%; ▌Michael J. Caruso (Win the War) 0.2%; ▌Jay Anyon (Communist) 0.2%
New Jersey 11	Albert L. Vreeland	Republican	1938	Incumbent retired to serve in the Army. Republican hold.	▌ ✓ Frank Sundstrom (Republican) 58.9%; ▌William Freiday (Democratic) 38.1%; ▌Gertrude Lubin (Socialist) 2.5%; ▌Wesley U. Morris (Prohibition) 0.4%
New Jersey 12	Robert Kean	Republican	1938	Incumbent re-elected.	▌ ✓ Robert Kean (Republican) 60.8%; ▌Joseph Siegler (Democratic) 36.2%; ▌Frieda Norman (Communist) 2.3%; ▌Rubye Smith (Socialist) 0.4%; ▌John P. Wagner (Prohibition) 0.2%; ▌Salvatore DeCarlo (Liberal) 0.2%
New Jersey 13	Mary Teresa Norton	Democratic	1924	Incumbent re-elected.	▌ ✓ Mary Teresa Norton (Democratic) 79.6%; ▌Raymond J. Cuddy (Republican) 20.4%
New Jersey 14	Edward J. Hart	Democratic	1934	Incumbent re-elected.	▌ ✓ Edward J. Hart (Democratic) 78.9%; ▌Otto A. Trankler (Republican) 21.1%

== New Mexico ==
Reapportioned from 1 representative to 2; both of the representatives were elected at large.

District	Incumbent			This race	
District	Representative	Party	First elected	Results	Candidates
New Mexico at-large	Clinton Anderson	Democratic	1940	Incumbent re-elected.	▌ ✓ Clinton Anderson (Democratic) 30.2%; ▌ ✓ Antonio M. Fernández (Democratic) 27.8%; ▌William A. Sutherland (Republican) 21.1%; ▌Reese P. Fullerton (Republican) 20.9%
New Mexico at-large	None (new district)			New seat. Democratic gain.	▌ ✓ Clinton Anderson (Democratic) 30.2%; ▌ ✓ Antonio M. Fernández (Democratic) 27.8%; ▌William A. Sutherland (Republican) 21.1%; ▌Reese P. Fullerton (Republican) 20.9%

== New York ==
District	Incumbent			This race	
District	Representative	Party	First elected	Results	Candidates
New York 1	Leonard W. Hall	Republican	1938	Incumbent re-elected.	▌ ✓ Leonard W. Hall (Republican) 68.1%; ▌Rene A. Carreau (Democratic) 28.8%; ▌Sabino Dewey (American Labor) 3.2%
New York 2	William Bernard Barry	Democratic	1935 (special)	Incumbent re-elected.	▌ ✓ William Bernard Barry (Democratic) 50.3%; ▌William D. Rawlins (Republican) 38.3%; ▌William F. Brunner (American Labor) 11.4%
New York 3	Joseph L. Pfeifer	Democratic	1934	Incumbent re-elected.	▌ ✓ Joseph L. Pfeifer (Democratic) 59.6%; ▌Samuel Rosenthal (Republican) 28.6%; ▌Joseph A. Weil (American Labor) 11.8%
New York 4	Thomas H. Cullen	Democratic	1918	Incumbent re-elected.	▌ ✓ Thomas H. Cullen (Democratic) 63.3%; ▌Frederick H. Gutkes (Republican) 29.7%; ▌Matthew P. Coleman (American Labor) 7.0%
New York 5	James J. Heffernan	Democratic	1940	Incumbent re-elected.	▌ ✓ James J. Heffernan (Democratic) 65.7%; ▌Charles G. Jochum (Republican) 34.3%
New York 6	Andrew Lawrence Somers	Democratic	1924	Incumbent re-elected.	▌ ✓ Andrew Lawrence Somers (Democratic) 72.2%; ▌Theodore R. Studwell (Republican) 27.8%
New York 7	John J. Delaney	Democratic	1931 (special)	Incumbent re-elected.	▌ ✓ John J. Delaney (Democratic) 72.8%; ▌Harry Boyarsky (Republican) 27.2%
New York 8	Donald Lawrence O'Toole	Democratic	1936	Incumbent re-elected.	▌ ✓ Donald Lawrence O'Toole (Democratic) 72.8%; ▌George F. Picken (Republican) 27.2%
New York 9	Eugene James Keogh	Democratic	1936	Incumbent re-elected.	▌ ✓ Eugene James Keogh (Democratic) 45.7%; ▌William J. Drake (Republican) 43.0%; ▌Albert Slade (American Labor) 11.4%
New York 10	Emanuel Celler	Democratic	1922	Incumbent re-elected.	▌ ✓ Emanuel Celler (Democratic) 68.6%; ▌Jerome Lewis (Republican) 31.4%
New York 11	James A. O'Leary	Democratic	1934	Incumbent re-elected.	▌ ✓ James A. O'Leary (Democratic) 57.9%; ▌Robert S. Woodward (Republican) 42.1%
New York 12	Samuel Dickstein	Democratic	1922	Incumbent re-elected.	▌ ✓ Samuel Dickstein (Democratic) 87.0%; ▌Hyman Hecht (Republican) 13.0%
New York 13	Louis Capozzoli	Democratic	1940	Incumbent re-elected.	▌ ✓ Louis Capozzoli (Democratic) 74.0%; ▌John Rosenberg (Republican) 26.0%
New York 14	Arthur George Klein	Democratic	1941 (special)	Incumbent re-elected.	▌ ✓ Arthur George Klein (Democratic) 63.8%; ▌Stuart Scheftel (Republican) 36.2%
New York 15	Michael J. Kennedy	Democratic	1938	Incumbent retired. Democratic hold.	▌ ✓ Thomas F. Burchill (Democratic) 58.7%; ▌Walter A. Lockwood (Republican) 30.1%; ▌John Rogan (American Labor) 11.1%
New York 16	William T. Pheiffer	Republican	1940	Incumbent lost re-election. Democratic gain.	▌ ✓ James H. Fay (Democratic) 50.1%; ▌William T. Pheiffer (Republican) 49.9%
New York 17	Joseph C. Baldwin	Republican	1941 (special)	Incumbent re-elected.	▌ ✓ Joseph C. Baldwin (Republican) 61.0%; ▌Carl Sherman (Democratic) 39.0%
New York 18	Martin J. Kennedy	Democratic	1930	Incumbent re-elected.	▌ ✓ Martin J. Kennedy (Democratic) 52.8%; ▌Garrow T. Geer Jr. (Republican) 47.2%
New York 19	Sol Bloom	Democratic	1923 (special)	Incumbent re-elected.	▌ ✓ Sol Bloom (Democratic) 67.5%; ▌Clarence McMillan (Republican) 32.5%
New York 20	Vito Marcantonio	Labor	1938	Incumbent re-elected.	▌ ✓ Vito Marcantonio (American Labor); Uncontested
New York 21	Joseph A. Gavagan	Democratic	1929 (special)	Incumbent re-elected.	▌ ✓ Joseph A. Gavagan (Democratic) 66.3%; ▌Herbert Malkin (Republican) 33.7%
New York 22	Walter A. Lynch	Democratic	1940	Incumbent re-elected.	▌ ✓ Walter A. Lynch (Democratic) 67.1%; ▌Richard C. Califano (Republican) 32.9%
New York 23	Charles A. Buckley	Democratic	1934	Incumbent re-elected.	▌ ✓ Charles A. Buckley (Democratic) 74.0%; ▌William J. Waterman (Republican) 26.0%
New York 24	James M. Fitzpatrick	Democratic	1926	Incumbent re-elected.	▌ ✓ James M. Fitzpatrick (Democratic) 57.5%; ▌Ralph W. Gwinn (Republican) 42.5%
New York 25	Ralph A. Gamble	Republican	1937 (special)	Incumbent re-elected.	▌ ✓ Ralph A. Gamble (Republican) 69.7%; ▌James J. Butterly (Democratic) 27.1%; ▌Dinah Lewis (American Labor) 3.2%
New York 26	Hamilton Fish III	Republican	1920	Incumbent re-elected.	▌ ✓ Hamilton Fish III (Republican) 52.2%; ▌Ferdinand A. Hoyt (Democratic) 47.8%
New York 27	Lewis K. Rockefeller	Republican	1937 (special)	Incumbent retired. Republican hold.	▌ ✓ Jay Le Fevre (Republican) 63.1%; ▌Sharon J. Mauhs (Democratic) 36.9%
New York 28	William T. Byrne	Democratic	1936	Incumbent re-elected.	▌ ✓ William T. Byrne (Democratic) 62.9%; ▌Ernest B. Morris (Republican) 37.1%
New York 29	E. Harold Cluett	Republican	1936	Incumbent retired. Republican hold.	▌ ✓ Dean P. Taylor (Republican) 68.8%; ▌John T. Degnan (Democratic) 31.2%
New York 30	Frank Crowther	Republican	1918	Incumbent retired. Republican hold.	▌ ✓ Bernard W. Kearney (Republican) 62.6%; ▌Burlin G. McKillip (Democratic) 34.6%; ▌Herbert M. Merrill (American Labor) 2.8%
New York 31	Clarence E. Kilburn	Republican	1940	Incumbent re-elected.	▌ ✓ Clarence E. Kilburn (Republican) 69.0%; ▌Thomas Q. Ryan (Democratic) 31.0%
New York 32	Francis D. Culkin	Republican	1928	Incumbent re-elected.	▌ ✓ Francis D. Culkin (Republican) 73.2%; ▌Vanche F. Milligan (Democratic) 25.3%; ▌Raymond K. Bull (American Labor) 1.5%
New York 33	Fred J. Douglas	Republican	1936	Incumbent re-elected.	▌ ✓ Fred J. Douglas (Republican) 60.3%; ▌Stanard Dow Butler (Democratic) 39.7%
New York 34	Edwin Arthur Hall	Republican	1939 (special)	Incumbent re-elected.	▌ ✓ Edwin Arthur Hall (Republican) 60.8%; ▌Arthur J. Ruland (Democratic) 37.6%; ▌Charles F. Doherty (American Labor) 1.6%
New York 35	Clarence E. Hancock	Republican	1927 (special)	Incumbent re-elected.	▌ ✓ Clarence E. Hancock (Republican) 64.5%; ▌Arthur B. McGuire (Democratic) 33.2%; ▌Fred Sander (American Labor) 2.3%
New York 36	John Taber	Republican	1922	Incumbent re-elected.	▌ ✓ John Taber (Republican) 62.6%; ▌Charles Osborne (Democratic) 37.4%
New York 37	W. Sterling Cole	Republican	1934	Incumbent re-elected.	▌ ✓ W. Sterling Cole (Republican) 70.9%; ▌Daniel Crowley (Democratic) 29.1%
New York 38	Joseph J. O'Brien	Republican	1938	Incumbent re-elected.	▌ ✓ Joseph J. O'Brien (Republican) 59.1%; ▌Walden Moore (Democratic) 40.9%
New York 39	James W. Wadsworth Jr.	Republican	1932	Incumbent re-elected.	▌ ✓ James W. Wadsworth Jr. (Republican); Uncontested
New York 40	Walter G. Andrews	Republican	1930	Incumbent re-elected.	▌ ✓ Walter G. Andrews (Republican) 68.8%; ▌Julian Park (Democratic) 31.2%
New York 41	Alfred F. Beiter	Democratic	1940	Incumbent lost re-election. Republican gain.	▌ ✓ Joseph Mruk (Republican) 57.4%; ▌Alfred F. Beiter (Democratic) 42.6%
New York 42	John Cornelius Butler	Republican	1941 (special)	Incumbent re-elected.	▌ ✓ John Cornelius Butler (Republican) 53.7%; ▌Frank J. Caffery (Democratic) 46.3%
New York 43	Daniel A. Reed	Republican	1918	Incumbent re-elected.	▌ ✓ Daniel A. Reed (Republican) 64.2%; ▌Clare Barnes (Democratic) 30.7%; ▌Nelson M. Fuller (American Labor) 5.1%
New York at-large	Matthew J. Merritt	Democratic	1934	Incumbent re-elected.	▌ ✓ Winifred C. Stanley (Republican) 25.3%; ▌ ✓ Matthew J. Merritt (Democratic) 24.5%; ▌Charles Muzzicato (Republican) 24.3%; ▌Flora D. Johnson (Democratic) 24.1%; ▌Benjamin J. Davis Jr. (Communist) 0.7%; ▌Elizabeth Gurley Flynn (Communist) 0.6%; ▌Layle Lane (Socialist) 0.3%; ▌Amicus Most (Socialist) 0.2%
New York at-large	Caroline O'Day	Democratic	1934	Incumbent retired. Republican gain.	▌ ✓ Winifred C. Stanley (Republican) 25.3%; ▌ ✓ Matthew J. Merritt (Democratic) 24.5%; ▌Charles Muzzicato (Republican) 24.3%; ▌Flora D. Johnson (Democratic) 24.1%; ▌Benjamin J. Davis Jr. (Communist) 0.7%; ▌Elizabeth Gurley Flynn (Communist) 0.6%; ▌Layle Lane (Socialist) 0.3%; ▌Amicus Most (Socialist) 0.2%

== North Carolina ==
North Carolina was reapportioned from 11 seats to 12, and reorganized the existing 10th and 11th districts (in the mountainous west of the state) into three districts.

District	Incumbent			This race	
District	Representative	Party	First elected	Results	Candidates
North Carolina 1	Herbert Covington Bonner	Democratic	1940	Incumbent re-elected.	▌ ✓ Herbert Covington Bonner (Democratic) 92.6%; ▌J. C. Meekins Jr. (Republican) 7.4%
North Carolina 2	John H. Kerr	Democratic	1923 (special)	Incumbent re-elected.	▌ ✓ John H. Kerr (Democratic); Uncontested
North Carolina 3	Graham Arthur Barden	Democratic	1934	Incumbent re-elected.	▌ ✓ Graham Arthur Barden (Democratic); Uncontested
North Carolina 4	Harold D. Cooley	Democratic	1934	Incumbent re-elected.	▌ ✓ Harold D. Cooley (Democratic) 65.2%; ▌Wiley L. Ward (Republican) 34.8%
North Carolina 5	John Hamlin Folger	Democratic	1941 (special)	Incumbent re-elected.	▌ ✓ John Hamlin Folger (Democratic) 67.5%; ▌S. Evan Hall (Republican) 32.5%
North Carolina 6	Carl T. Durham	Democratic	1938	Incumbent re-elected.	▌ ✓ Carl T. Durham (Democratic) 74.5%; ▌Hobart M. Patterson (Independent) 25.5%
North Carolina 7	J. Bayard Clark	Democratic	1928	Incumbent re-elected.	▌ ✓ J. Bayard Clark (Democratic); Uncontested
North Carolina 8	William O. Burgin	Democratic	1938	Incumbent re-elected.	▌ ✓ William O. Burgin (Democratic) 56.5%; ▌A. D. Barber (Republican) 43.5%
North Carolina 9	Robert L. Doughton	Democratic	1910	Incumbent re-elected.	▌ ✓ Robert L. Doughton (Democratic); Uncontested
North Carolina 10	None (new district)			New seat. Democratic gain.	▌ ✓ Cameron A. Morrison (Democratic) 55.4%; ▌Charles A. Jonas (Republican) 44.6%
North Carolina 11	Alfred L. Bulwinkle; Redistricted from the 10th district	Democratic	1930	Incumbent re-elected.	▌ ✓ Alfred L. Bulwinkle (Democratic); Uncontested
North Carolina 12	Zebulon Weaver; Redistricted from the 11th district	Democratic	1930	Incumbent re-elected.	▌ ✓ Zebulon Weaver (Democratic) 65.3%; ▌Gola P. Ferguson (Republican) 34.7%

== North Dakota ==
District	Incumbent			This race	
District	Representative	Party	First elected	Results	Candidates
North Dakota at-large	Usher L. Burdick	Republican-NPL	1934	Incumbent re-elected.	▌ ✓ Usher L. Burdick (Republican-NPL) 30.7%; ▌ ✓ William Lemke (Republican-NPL) 23.6%; ▌Charles R. Robertson (Independent) 17.3%; ▌Halvor L. Halvorson (Democratic) 17.1%; ▌Adolph Michelson (Democratic) 11.3%
North Dakota at-large	Charles R. Robertson	Republican	1940	Incumbent lost renomination and re-election as an independent. Republican hold.	▌ ✓ Usher L. Burdick (Republican-NPL) 30.7%; ▌ ✓ William Lemke (Republican-NPL) 23.6%; ▌Charles R. Robertson (Independent) 17.3%; ▌Halvor L. Halvorson (Democratic) 17.1%; ▌Adolph Michelson (Democratic) 11.3%

== Ohio ==
Ohio was reapportioned from 24 seats to 23, and removed one of its two at-large seats while leaving the 22 geographical districts unchanged.

District	Incumbent			This race	
District	Representative	Party	First elected	Results	Candidates
Ohio 1	Charles H. Elston	Republican	1938	Incumbent re-elected.	▌ ✓ Charles H. Elston (Republican) 61.5%; ▌William H. Hessler (Democratic) 38.5%
Ohio 2	William E. Hess	Republican	1938	Incumbent re-elected.	▌ ✓ William E. Hess (Republican) 64.0%; ▌Nicholas Bauer (Democratic) 36.0%
Ohio 3	Greg J. Holbrock	Democratic	1940	Incumbent lost re-election. Republican gain.	▌ ✓ Harry P. Jeffrey (Republican) 51.6%; ▌Greg J. Holbrock (Democratic) 48.4%
Ohio 4	Robert Franklin Jones	Republican	1938	Incumbent re-elected.	▌ ✓ Robert Franklin Jones (Republican) 63.5%; ▌Clarence C. Miller (Democratic) 36.5%
Ohio 5	Cliff Clevenger	Republican	1938	Incumbent re-elected.	▌ ✓ Cliff Clevenger (Republican) 63.6%; ▌Ferdinand E. Warren (Democratic) 36.4%
Ohio 6	Jacob E. Davis	Democratic	1940	Incumbent lost re-election. Republican gain.	▌ ✓ Edward O. McCowen (Republican) 51.1%; ▌Jacob E. Davis (Democratic) 48.9%
Ohio 7	Clarence J. Brown	Republican	1938	Incumbent re-elected.	▌ ✓ Clarence J. Brown (Republican) 69.1%; ▌George H. Smith (Democratic) 30.9%
Ohio 8	Frederick C. Smith	Republican	1938	Incumbent re-elected.	▌ ✓ Frederick C. Smith (Republican) 59.8%; ▌Thomas B. Fletcher (Democratic) 40.2%
Ohio 9	John F. Hunter	Democratic	1936	Incumbent lost re-election. Republican gain.	▌ ✓ Homer A. Ramey (Republican) 51.8%; ▌John F. Hunter (Democratic) 48.2%
Ohio 10	Thomas A. Jenkins	Republican	1924	Incumbent re-elected.	▌ ✓ Thomas A. Jenkins (Republican) 64.2%; ▌Oral Daugherty (Democratic) 35.8%
Ohio 11	Harold K. Claypool	Democratic	1936	Incumbent lost re-election. Republican gain.	▌ ✓ Walter E. Brehm (Republican) 61.3%; ▌Harold K. Claypool (Democratic) 38.7%
Ohio 12	John M. Vorys	Republican	1938	Incumbent re-elected.	▌ ✓ John M. Vorys (Republican) 58.4%; ▌Arthur P. Lamneck (Democratic) 41.6%
Ohio 13	Albert David Baumhart Jr.	Republican	1940	Incumbent resigned to serve in the U.S. Navy. Republican hold.	▌ ✓ Alvin F. Weichel (Republican) 61.6%; ▌E. C. Alexander (Democratic) 38.4%
Ohio 14	Dow W. Harter	Democratic	1932	Incumbent lost re-election. Republican gain.	▌ ✓ Edmund Rowe (Republican) 51.3%; ▌Dow W. Harter (Democratic) 48.7%
Ohio 15	Robert T. Secrest	Democratic	1932	Resigned to serve in U. S. Navy; Republican gain.	▌ ✓ Percy W. Griffiths (Republican) 60.2%; ▌Charles W. Lynch (Democratic) 39.8%
Ohio 16	William R. Thom	Democratic	1940	Incumbent lost re-election. Republican gain.	▌ ✓ Henderson H. Carson (Republican) 52.7%; ▌William R. Thom (Democratic) 47.3%
Ohio 17	J. Harry McGregor	Republican	1940	Incumbent re-elected.	▌ ✓ J. Harry McGregor (Republican) 62.8%; ▌Samuel A. Anderson (Democratic) 37.2%
Ohio 18	Lawrence E. Imhoff	Democratic	1940	Incumbent lost re-election. Republican gain.	▌ ✓ Earl R. Lewis (Republican) 53.3%; ▌Lawrence E. Imhoff (Democratic) 46.7%
Ohio 19	Michael J. Kirwan	Democratic	1936	Incumbent re-elected.	▌ ✓ Michael J. Kirwan (Democratic) 56.4%; ▌James T. Begg (Republican) 43.6%
Ohio 20	Martin L. Sweeney	Democratic	1931 (special)	Incumbent lost renomination. Democratic hold.	▌ ✓ Michael A. Feighan (Democratic) 61.8%; ▌Harry T. Marshall (Republican) 25.1%; ▌Marie R. Sweeney (Independent) 13.1%
Ohio 21	Robert Crosser	Democratic	1922	Incumbent re-elected.	▌ ✓ Robert Crosser (Democratic) 63.8%; ▌William J. Rogers (Republican) 34.8%; ▌Arnold S. Johnson (Independent) 1.4%
Ohio 22	Frances P. Bolton	Republican	1940	Incumbent re-elected.	▌ ✓ Frances P. Bolton (Republican) 57.1%; ▌James Metzenbaum (Democratic) 42.9%
Ohio at-large	George H. Bender	Republican	1938	Incumbent re-elected.	▌ ✓ George H. Bender (Republican) 56.9%; ▌Stephen M. Young (Democratic) 43.1%
Ohio at-large	Stephen M. Young	Democratic	1940	Incumbent lost re-election. Democratic loss.	▌ ✓ George H. Bender (Republican) 56.9%; ▌Stephen M. Young (Democratic) 43.1%

== Oklahoma ==
District	Incumbent			This race	
District	Representative	Party	First elected	Results	Candidates
Oklahoma 1	Wesley E. Disney	Democratic	1930	Incumbent re-elected.	▌ ✓ Wesley E. Disney (Democratic) 54.2%; ▌W. R. Boyd (Republican) 44.4%; ▌George W. Ford (Independent) 1.1%; ▌F. E. Pomeroy (Prohibition) 0.3%
Oklahoma 2	John Conover Nichols	Democratic	1934	Incumbent re-elected.	▌ ✓ John Conover Nichols (Democratic) 50.5%; ▌E. O. Clark (Republican) 49.5%
Oklahoma 3	Wilburn Cartwright	Democratic	1926	Incumbent lost renomination. Democratic hold.	▌ ✓ Paul Stewart (Democratic) 78.6%; ▌Frank D. McSherry (Republican) 21.4%
Oklahoma 4	Lyle Boren	Democratic	1936	Incumbent re-elected.	▌ ✓ Lyle Boren (Democratic) 56.8%; ▌Charles E. Wells (Republican) 43.2%
Oklahoma 5	Mike Monroney	Democratic	1938	Incumbent re-elected.	▌ ✓ Mike Monroney (Democratic) 69.7%; ▌George Wesley Colvert (Republican) 29.8%; ▌Lizzie Varvil (Prohibition) 0.5%
Oklahoma 6	Jed Johnson	Democratic	1926	Incumbent re-elected.	▌ ✓ Jed Johnson (Democratic) 57.9%; ▌J. L. Hart Jr. (Republican) 42.1%
Oklahoma 7	Victor Wickersham	Democratic	1941 (special)	Incumbent re-elected.	▌ ✓ Victor Wickersham (Democratic) 70.0%; ▌Roscoe C. Holt (Republican) 30.0%
Oklahoma 8	Ross Rizley	Republican	1940	Incumbent re-elected.	▌ ✓ Ross Rizley (Republican) 60.3%; ▌Julius W. Cox (Democratic) 39.0%; ▌Don Klingensmith (Prohibition) 0.6%

== Oregon ==
Oregon redistricted from 3 districts to 4 by splitting the old 1st district (the western part of the state except Multnomah County) and putting the southern half (Linn and Lane counties and the counties to the south) into a 4th district.

District	Incumbent			This race	
District	Representative	Party	First elected	Results	Candidates
Oregon 1	James W. Mott	Republican	1932	Incumbent re-elected.	▌ ✓ James W. Mott (Republican) 69.5%; ▌Earl A. Nott (Democratic) 30.5%
Oregon 2	Walter M. Pierce	Democratic	1932	Incumbent lost re-election. Republican gain.	▌ ✓ Lowell Stockman (Republican) 61.4%; ▌Walter M. Pierce (Democratic) 38.6%
Oregon 3	Homer D. Angell	Republican	1938	Incumbent re-elected.	▌ ✓ Homer D. Angell (Republican) 51.0%; ▌Thomas R. Mahoney (Democratic) 49.0%
Oregon 4	None (new district)			New seat. Republican gain.	▌ ✓ Harris Ellsworth (Republican) 51.0%; ▌Edward C. Kelly (Democratic) 49.0%

== Pennsylvania ==
Pennsylvania was reapportioned from 34 to 33 representatives, and redistricted from 34 to 32 geographical districts with one new at-large district. The Philadelphia-area districts were left pretty much unchanged, with the removal of one district in north-central Pennsylvania and another in Pittsburgh and compensating adjustments to nearby districts.

District	Incumbent			This race	
District	Representative	Party	First elected	Results	Candidates
Pennsylvania 1	Leon Sacks	Democratic	1936	Incumbent lost re-election. Republican gain.	▌ ✓ James A. Gallagher (Republican) 53.5%; ▌Leon Sacks (Democratic) 46.5%
Pennsylvania 2	James P. McGranery	Democratic	1936	Incumbent re-elected.	▌ ✓ James P. McGranery (Democratic) 50.5%; ▌Augustus Trask Ashton (Republican) 49.5%
Pennsylvania 3	Michael J. Bradley	Democratic	1936	Incumbent re-elected.	▌ ✓ Michael J. Bradley (Democratic) 51.4%; ▌John R. K. Scott (Republican) 48.6%
Pennsylvania 4	John E. Sheridan	Democratic	1939 (special)	Incumbent re-elected.	▌ ✓ John E. Sheridan (Democratic) 53.2%; ▌Howard T. Scott (Republican) 45.1%; ▌Harry J. Greene (Citizens Progressive) 1.6%; ▌John A. Oebbecke (Social Reconstruction) 0.1%
Pennsylvania 5	Francis R. Smith	Democratic	1940	Incumbent lost re-election. Republican gain.	▌ ✓ C. Frederick Pracht (Republican) 51.1%; ▌Francis R. Smith (Democratic) 48.9%
Pennsylvania 6	Francis J. Myers	Democratic	1938	Incumbent re-elected.	▌ ✓ Francis J. Myers (Democratic) 55.3%; ▌William H. Sylk (Republican) 44.7%
Pennsylvania 7	Hugh Scott	Republican	1940	Incumbent re-elected.	▌ ✓ Hugh Scott (Republican) 55.7%; ▌Thomas Z. Minehart (Democratic) 44.3%
Pennsylvania 8	James Wolfenden	Republican	1928	Incumbent re-elected.	▌ ✓ James Wolfenden (Republican) 58.5%; ▌Vernon O'Rourke (Democratic) 41.5%
Pennsylvania 9	Charles L. Gerlach	Republican	1938	Incumbent re-elected.	▌ ✓ Charles L. Gerlach (Republican) 62.0%; ▌Francis L. Collum (Democratic) 38.0%
Pennsylvania 10	J. Roland Kinzer	Republican	1930	Incumbent re-elected.	▌ ✓ J. Roland Kinzer (Republican) 68.8%; ▌Daniel J. C. O'Donnell (Democratic) 31.2%
Pennsylvania 11	Patrick J. Boland	Democratic	1930	Incumbent died May 18, 1942. Democratic hold.	▌ ✓ John W. Murphy (Democratic) 55.8%; ▌James K. Peck (Republican) 44.2%
Pennsylvania 12	Thomas B. Miller	Republican	1942 (special)	Incumbent re-elected.	▌ ✓ Thomas B. Miller (Republican) 54.5%; ▌Daniel Flood (Democratic) 45.5%
Pennsylvania 13	Ivor D. Fenton	Republican	1938	Incumbent re-elected.	▌ ✓ Ivor D. Fenton (Republican) 58.2%; ▌J. Noble Hirsch (Democratic) 41.8%
Pennsylvania 14	Guy L. Moser	Democratic	1936	Incumbent lost renomination. Democratic hold.	▌ ✓ Daniel K. Hoch (Democratic) 51.1%; ▌John C. Griesemer (Republican) 42.8%; ▌Raymond S. Hofses (Socialist) 6.1%
Pennsylvania 15	Wilson D. Gillette	Republican	1941 (special)	Incumbent re-elected.	▌ ✓ Wilson D. Gillette (Republican) 65.7%; ▌Michael E. Yurkovsky (Democratic) 34.3%; ▌Marion M. Heller (Prohibition) 0.01%
Pennsylvania 15	Robert F. Rich; Redistricted from the 16th district	Republican	1930	Incumbent retired. Republican loss.	▌ ✓ Wilson D. Gillette (Republican) 65.7%; ▌Michael E. Yurkovsky (Democratic) 34.3%; ▌Marion M. Heller (Prohibition) 0.01%
Pennsylvania 16	Thomas E. Scanlon; Redistricted from the 30th district	Democratic	1940	Incumbent re-elected.	▌ ✓ Thomas E. Scanlon (Democratic) 51.3%; ▌Robert Van Der Voort (Republican) 48.7%
Pennsylvania 17	J. William Ditter	Republican	1932	Incumbent re-elected.	▌ ✓ J. William Ditter (Republican) 69.2%; ▌Charles W. Moyer (Democratic) 30.8%
Pennsylvania 18	Richard M. Simpson	Republican	1937 (special)	Incumbent re-elected.	▌ ✓ Richard M. Simpson (Republican) 62.0%; ▌John W. Mann (Democratic) 38.0%
Pennsylvania 19	John C. Kunkel	Republican	1938	Incumbent re-elected.	▌ ✓ John C. Kunkel (Republican) 66.0%; ▌Andrew S. Beshore (Democratic) 34.0%
Pennsylvania 20	Benjamin Jarrett	Republican	1936	Incumbent retired. Republican hold.	▌ ✓ Leon H. Gavin (Republican) 64.5%; ▌John C. Brecht (Democratic) 34.5%; ▌Christian H. Diegal (Prohibition) 1.0%
Pennsylvania 21	Francis E. Walter	Democratic	1932	Incumbent re-elected.	▌ ✓ Francis E. Walter (Democratic) 53.5%; ▌William R. Coyle (Republican) 46.5%
Pennsylvania 22	Harry L. Haines	Democratic	1940	Incumbent lost re-election. Republican gain.	▌ ✓ Chester H. Gross (Republican) 50.1%; ▌Harry L. Haines (Democratic) 49.9%
Pennsylvania 23	James E. Van Zandt	Republican	1938	Incumbent re-elected.	▌ ✓ James E. Van Zandt (Republican) 61.0%; ▌Harry E. Diehl (Democratic) 39.0%
Pennsylvania 24	J. Buell Snyder	Democratic	1932	Incumbent re-elected.	▌ ✓ J. Buell Snyder (Democratic) 51.1%; ▌Carl H. Hoffman (Republican) 48.9%
Pennsylvania 25	Charles I. Faddis	Democratic	1932	Incumbent lost renomination. Democratic hold.	▌ ✓ Grant Furlong (Democratic) 50.3%; ▌M. B. Armstrong (Republican) 49.7%
Pennsylvania 26	Louis E. Graham	Republican	1938	Incumbent re-elected.	▌ ✓ Louis E. Graham (Republican) 58.5%; ▌Peter P. Reising (Democratic) 41.5%
Pennsylvania 27	Harve Tibbott	Republican	1938	Incumbent re-elected.	▌ ✓ Harve Tibbott (Republican) 55.6%; ▌Eddie McCloskey (Democratic) 44.4%
Pennsylvania 28	Augustine B. Kelley	Democratic	1940	Incumbent re-elected.	▌ ✓ Augustine B. Kelley (Democratic) 53.5%; ▌Edward R. Stirling (Republican) 46.5%
Pennsylvania 29	Robert L. Rodgers	Republican	1938	Incumbent re-elected.	▌ ✓ Robert L. Rodgers (Republican) 59.3%; ▌James F. Lavery (Democratic) 40.7%
Pennsylvania 30	Samuel A. Weiss; Redistricted from the 31st district	Democratic	1940	Incumbent re-elected.	▌ ✓ Samuel A. Weiss (Democratic) 56.4%; ▌John McDowell (Republican) 43.6%
Pennsylvania 31	Herman P. Eberharter; Redistricted from the 32nd district	Democratic	1936	Incumbent re-elected.	▌ ✓ Herman P. Eberharter (Democratic) 58.1%; ▌Robert Garland (Republican) 41.9%
Pennsylvania 32	James A. Wright; Redistricted from the 34th district	Democratic	1940	Incumbent re-elected.	▌ ✓ James A. Wright (Democratic) 51.6%; ▌James G. Fulton (Republican) 48.4%
Pennsylvania 32	Elmer J. Holland; Redistricted from the 33rd district	Democratic	1942 (special)	Incumbent retired. Democratic loss.	▌ ✓ James A. Wright (Democratic) 51.6%; ▌James G. Fulton (Republican) 48.4%
Pennsylvania at-large	None (new district)			New seat. Republican gain.	▌ ✓ William I. Troutman (Republican) 54.7%; ▌Inez B. Peel (Democratic) 44.4%; ▌Robert G. Burnham (Prohibition) 0.9%

== Rhode Island ==
District	Incumbent			This race	
District	Representative	Party	First elected	Results	Candidates
Rhode Island 1	Aime Forand	Democratic	1940	Incumbent re-elected.	▌ ✓ Aime Forand (Democratic) 59.0%; ▌Charles H. Eden (Republican) 41.0%
Rhode Island 2	John E. Fogarty	Democratic	1940	Incumbent re-elected.	▌ ✓ John E. Fogarty (Democratic) 57.4%; ▌Harry Sandager (Republican) 42.6%

== South Carolina ==
District	Incumbent			This race	
District	Representative	Party	First elected	Results	Candidates
South Carolina 1	L. Mendel Rivers	Democratic	1940	Incumbent re-elected.	▌ ✓ L. Mendel Rivers (Democratic); Uncontested
South Carolina 2	Hampton P. Fulmer	Democratic	1920	Incumbent re-elected.	▌ ✓ Hampton P. Fulmer (Democratic); Uncontested
South Carolina 3	Butler B. Hare	Democratic	1938	Incumbent re-elected.	▌ ✓ Butler B. Hare (Democratic); Uncontested
South Carolina 4	Joseph R. Bryson	Democratic	1938	Incumbent re-elected.	▌ ✓ Joseph R. Bryson (Democratic); Uncontested
South Carolina 5	James P. Richards	Democratic	1932	Incumbent re-elected.	▌ ✓ James P. Richards (Democratic); Uncontested
South Carolina 6	John L. McMillan	Democratic	1938	Incumbent re-elected.	▌ ✓ John L. McMillan (Democratic); Uncontested

== South Dakota ==
District	Incumbent			This race	
District	Representative	Party	First elected	Results	Candidates
South Dakota 1	Karl Mundt	Republican	1938	Incumbent re-elected.	▌ ✓ Karl Mundt (Republican) 59.9%; ▌Fred H. Hildebrandt (Democratic) 40.1%
South Dakota 2	Francis Case	Republican	1936	Incumbent re-elected.	▌ ✓ Francis Case (Republican) 71.9%; ▌George M. Bailey (Democratic) 28.1%

== Tennessee ==
Tennessee was reapportioned from 9 districts to 10, and added an additional district in the central part of the state, allowing Davidson County to have its own district.

District	Incumbent			This race	
District	Representative	Party	First elected	Results	Candidates
Tennessee 1	B. Carroll Reece	Republican	1932	Incumbent re-elected.	▌ ✓ B. Carroll Reece (Republican) 96.1%; ▌H. T. D. Wills (Independent) 3.9%
Tennessee 2	John Jennings	Republican	1939 (special)	Incumbent re-elected.	▌ ✓ John Jennings (Republican) 53.6%; ▌John T. O'Connor (Democratic) 46.4%
Tennessee 3	Estes Kefauver	Democratic	1939 (special)	Incumbent re-elected.	▌ ✓ Estes Kefauver (Democratic) 75.6%; ▌Walter Higgins (Republican) 19.7%; ▌Walter Harris (Independent) 4.6%
Tennessee 4	Albert Gore Sr.	Democratic	1938	Incumbent re-elected.	▌ ✓ Albert Gore Sr. (Democratic) 68.9%; ▌H. E. McLean (Republican) 31.1%
Tennessee 5	None (new district)			New seat. Democratic gain.	▌ ✓ Jim Nance McCord (Democratic); Uncontested
Tennessee 6	Percy Priest; Redistricted from the 5th district	Democratic	1940	Incumbent re-elected.	▌ ✓ Percy Priest (Democratic); Uncontested
Tennessee 7	W. Wirt Courtney; Redistricted from the 6th district	Democratic	1939 (special)	Incumbent re-elected.	▌ ✓ W. Wirt Courtney (Democratic); Uncontested
Tennessee 8	Herron C. Pearson; Redistricted from the 7th district	Democratic	1934	Incumbent retired. Democratic hold.	▌ ✓ Tom J. Murray (Democratic) 61.2%; ▌P. W. Maddox (Republican) 38.8%
Tennessee 9	Jere Cooper; Redistricted from the 8th district	Democratic	1928	Incumbent re-elected.	▌ ✓ Jere Cooper (Democratic) 89.3%; ▌S. Homer Tatum (Independent) 10.7%
Tennessee 10	Clifford Davis; Redistricted from the 9th district	Democratic	1940	Incumbent re-elected.	▌ ✓ Clifford Davis (Democratic); Uncontested

== Texas ==
District	Incumbent			This race	
District	Representative	Party	First elected	Results	Candidates
Texas 1	Wright Patman	Democratic	1928	Incumbent re-elected.	▌ ✓ Wright Patman (Democratic); Uncontested
Texas 2	Martin Dies Jr.	Democratic	1930	Incumbent re-elected.	▌ ✓ Martin Dies Jr. (Democratic); Uncontested
Texas 3	Lindley Beckworth	Democratic	1938	Incumbent re-elected.	▌ ✓ Lindley Beckworth (Democratic); Uncontested
Texas 4	Sam Rayburn	Democratic	1912	Incumbent re-elected.	▌ ✓ Sam Rayburn (Democratic); Uncontested
Texas 5	Hatton W. Sumners	Democratic	1914	Incumbent re-elected.	▌ ✓ Hatton W. Sumners (Democratic); Uncontested
Texas 6	Luther A. Johnson	Democratic	1922	Incumbent re-elected.	▌ ✓ Luther A. Johnson (Democratic); Uncontested
Texas 7	Nat Patton	Democratic	1934	Incumbent re-elected.	▌ ✓ Nat Patton (Democratic) 99.1%; ▌A. W. Orr (Republican) 0.9%
Texas 8	Albert Thomas	Democratic	1936	Incumbent re-elected.	▌ ✓ Albert Thomas (Democratic) 96.9%; ▌M. N. S. Kjorlang (Republican) 1.9%; ▌Vance Muse (Write-in) 1.2%
Texas 9	Joseph J. Mansfield	Democratic	1916	Incumbent re-elected.	▌ ✓ Joseph J. Mansfield (Democratic); Uncontested
Texas 10	Lyndon B. Johnson	Democratic	1937 (special)	Incumbent re-elected.	▌ ✓ Lyndon B. Johnson (Democratic); Uncontested
Texas 11	William R. Poage	Democratic	1936	Incumbent re-elected.	▌ ✓ William R. Poage (Democratic); Uncontested
Texas 12	Fritz G. Lanham	Democratic	1919 (special)	Incumbent re-elected.	▌ ✓ Fritz G. Lanham (Democratic); Uncontested
Texas 13	Ed Gossett	Democratic	1938	Incumbent re-elected.	▌ ✓ Ed Gossett (Democratic) 98.1%; ▌Louis N. Gould (Republican) 1.9%
Texas 14	Richard M. Kleberg	Democratic	1931 (special)	Incumbent re-elected.	▌ ✓ Richard M. Kleberg (Democratic); Uncontested
Texas 15	Milton H. West	Democratic	1933 (special)	Incumbent re-elected.	▌ ✓ Milton H. West (Democratic); Uncontested
Texas 16	R. Ewing Thomason	Democratic	1930	Incumbent re-elected.	▌ ✓ R. Ewing Thomason (Democratic); Uncontested
Texas 17	Sam M. Russell	Democratic	1940	Incumbent re-elected.	▌ ✓ Sam M. Russell (Democratic); Uncontested
Texas 18	Eugene Worley	Democratic	1940	Incumbent re-elected.	▌ ✓ Eugene Worley (Democratic); Uncontested
Texas 19	George H. Mahon	Democratic	1934	Incumbent re-elected.	▌ ✓ George H. Mahon (Democratic); Uncontested
Texas 20	Paul J. Kilday	Democratic	1938	Incumbent re-elected.	▌ ✓ Paul J. Kilday (Democratic) 81.7%; ▌William A. Turner (Republican) 18.3%
Texas 21	Charles L. South	Democratic	1934	Incumbent lost renomination. Democratic hold.	▌ ✓ O. C. Fisher (Democratic); Uncontested

== Utah ==
District	Incumbent			This race	
District	Representative	Party	First elected	Results	Candidates
Utah 1	Walter K. Granger	Democratic	1940	Incumbent re-elected.	▌ ✓ Walter K. Granger (Democratic) 50.2%; ▌J. Bracken Lee (Republican) 49.8%
Utah 2	J. W. Robinson	Democratic	1932	Incumbent re-elected.	▌ ✓ J. W. Robinson (Democratic) 55.8%; ▌Reed E. Vetterli (Republican) 44.2%

== Vermont ==
District	Incumbent			This race	
District	Representative	Party	First elected	Results	Candidates
Vermont at-large	Charles A. Plumley	Republican	1934	Incumbent re-elected.	▌ ✓ Charles A. Plumley (Republican) 70.2%; ▌John B. Candon (Democratic) 29.8%

== Virginia ==
District	Incumbent			This race	
District	Representative	Party	First elected	Results	Candidates
Virginia 1	S. Otis Bland	Democratic	1918	Incumbent re-elected.	▌ ✓ S. Otis Bland (Democratic); Uncontested
Virginia 2	Winder R. Harris	Democratic	1938	Incumbent re-elected.	▌ ✓ Winder R. Harris (Democratic); Uncontested
Virginia 3	Dave E. Satterfield Jr.	Democratic	1937 (special)	Incumbent re-elected.	▌ ✓ Dave E. Satterfield Jr. (Democratic); Uncontested
Virginia 4	Patrick H. Drewry	Democratic	1920	Incumbent re-elected.	▌ ✓ Patrick H. Drewry (Democratic); Uncontested
Virginia 5	Thomas G. Burch	Democratic	1930	Incumbent re-elected.	▌ ✓ Thomas G. Burch (Democratic) 93.1%; ▌Howard H. Carwile (Socialist) 6.9%
Virginia 6	Clifton A. Woodrum	Democratic	1922	Incumbent re-elected.	▌ ✓ Clifton A. Woodrum (Democratic) 93.6%; ▌Stephen A. Moore (Socialist) 6.4%
Virginia 7	A. Willis Robertson	Democratic	1932	Incumbent re-elected.	▌ ✓ A. Willis Robertson (Democratic); Uncontested
Virginia 8	Howard W. Smith	Democratic	1930	Incumbent re-elected.	▌ ✓ Howard W. Smith (Democratic) 86.6%; ▌Harry Byrd Conlin (Republican) 11.4%; ▌Clarke T. Robb (Socialist) 2.0%
Virginia 9	John W. Flannagan Jr.	Democratic	1930	Incumbent re-elected.	▌ ✓ John W. Flannagan Jr. (Democratic) 63.6%; ▌Cary Ingram Crockett (Republican) 36.4%

== Washington ==
District	Incumbent			This race	
District	Representative	Party	First elected	Results	Candidates
Washington 1	Warren Magnuson	Democratic	1936	Incumbent re-elected.	▌ ✓ Warren Magnuson (Democratic) 65.5%; ▌Harold H. Stewart (Republican) 34.1%; ▌P. J. Alter (Socialist Labor) 0.4%
Washington 2	Henry M. Jackson	Democratic	1940	Incumbent re-elected.	▌ ✓ Henry M. Jackson (Democratic) 59.9%; ▌Payson Peterson (Republican) 40.1%
Washington 3	Martin F. Smith	Democratic	1932	Incumbent lost re-election. Republican gain.	▌ ✓ Fred B. Norman (Republican) 57.1%; ▌Martin F. Smith (Democratic) 42.9%
Washington 4	Knute Hill	Democratic	1932	Incumbent lost re-election. Republican gain.	▌ ✓ Hal Holmes (Republican) 63.6%; ▌Knute Hill (Democratic) 36.4%
Washington 5	Charles H. Leavy	Democratic	1936	Resigned when appointed judge. Republican gain.	▌ ✓ Walt Horan (Republican) 62.7%; ▌Clarence Dill (Democratic) 37.3%
Washington 6	John M. Coffee	Democratic	1936	Incumbent re-elected.	▌ ✓ John M. Coffee (Democratic) 64.0%; ▌Ralph Woods (Republican) 35.5%; ▌Selmer Skreen (Socialist Labor) 0.6%

== West Virginia ==
District	Incumbent			This race	
District	Representative	Party	First elected	Results	Candidates
West Virginia 1	Robert L. Ramsay	Democratic	1940	Incumbent lost re-election. Republican gain.	▌ ✓ A. C. Schiffler (Republican) 54.7%; ▌Robert L. Ramsay (Democratic) 45.3%
West Virginia 2	Jennings Randolph	Democratic	1932	Incumbent re-elected.	▌ ✓ Jennings Randolph (Democratic) 50.2%; ▌Charles G. Baker (Republican) 49.8%
West Virginia 3	Andrew Edmiston Jr.	Democratic	1933 (special)	Incumbent lost re-election. Republican gain.	▌ ✓ Edward G. Rohrbough (Republican) 53.2%; ▌Andrew Edmiston Jr. (Democratic) 46.8%
West Virginia 4	George W. Johnson	Democratic	1932	Incumbent lost re-election. Republican gain.	▌ ✓ Hubert S. Ellis (Republican) 52.2%; ▌George W. Johnson (Democratic) 47.8%
West Virginia 5	John Kee	Democratic	1932	Incumbent re-elected.	▌ ✓ John Kee (Democratic) 57.2%; ▌B. F. Howard (Republican) 42.8%
West Virginia 6	Joe L. Smith	Democratic	1928	Incumbent re-elected.	▌ ✓ Joe L. Smith (Democratic) 51.8%; ▌Houston G. Young (Republican) 48.2%

== Wisconsin ==
District	Incumbent			This race	
District	Representative	Party	First elected	Results	Candidates
Wisconsin 1	Lawrence H. Smith	Republican	1941 (special)	Incumbent re-elected.	▌ ✓ Lawrence H. Smith (Republican) 71.9%; ▌Bernard F. Magruder (Democratic) 26.1%; ▌Walter G. Benson (Social-Democratic) 2.0%
Wisconsin 2	Harry Sauthoff	Progressive	1940	Incumbent re-elected.	▌ ✓ Harry Sauthoff (Progressive) 50.2%; ▌Charles Hawks Jr. (Republican) 39.6%; ▌Thomas R. Brooks (Democratic) 9.6%; ▌Fred A. Hale (Social-Democratic) 0.6%
Wisconsin 3	William H. Stevenson	Republican	1940	Incumbent re-elected.	▌ ✓ William H. Stevenson (Republican) 46.9%; ▌Gardner R. Withrow (Progressive) 42.6%; ▌William D. Carroll (Democratic) 10.1%; ▌Henry A. Ochsner (Social-Democratic) 0.4%
Wisconsin 4	Thad F. Wasielewski	Democratic	1940	Incumbent re-elected.	▌ ✓ Thad F. Wasielewski (Democratic) 48.8%; ▌John C. Schafer (Republican) 30.3%; ▌John C. Brophy (Progressive) 18.2%; ▌Robert Buech (Social-Democratic) 2.6%
Wisconsin 5	Lewis D. Thill	Republican	1938	Incumbent lost re-election. Democratic gain.	▌ ✓ Howard J. McMurray (Democratic) 43.2%; ▌Lewis D. Thill (Republican) 37.4%; ▌Roy A. Roush (Progressive) 16.0%; ▌Edwin W. Knappe (Social-Democratic) 3.5%
Wisconsin 6	Frank B. Keefe	Republican	1938	Incumbent re-elected.	▌ ✓ Frank B. Keefe (Republican) 62.2%; ▌Eugene Schallern (Democratic) 20.1%; ▌Adam F. Poltl (Progressive) 16.0%; ▌John C. Boll (Social-Democratic) 1.7%
Wisconsin 7	Reid F. Murray	Republican	1938	Incumbent re-elected.	▌ ✓ Reid F. Murray (Republican) 71.9%; ▌John A. Kennedy (Democratic) 28.1%
Wisconsin 8	Joshua L. Johns	Republican	1938	Incumbent lost re-election. Democratic gain.	▌ ✓ LaVern Dilweg (Democratic) 54.5%; ▌Joshua L. Johns (Republican) 45.5%
Wisconsin 9	Merlin Hull	Progressive	1934	Incumbent re-elected.	▌ ✓ Merlin Hull (Progressive) 61.8%; ▌George H. Hipke (Republican) 32.6%; ▌Jack E. Joyce (Democratic) 5.6%
Wisconsin 10	Bernard J. Gehrmann	Progressive	1934	Incumbent lost re-election. Republican gain.	▌ ✓ Alvin O'Konski (Republican) 48.4%; ▌Bernard J. Gehrmann (Progressive) 41.1%; ▌John G. Green (Democratic) 10.5%

== Wyoming ==
District	Incumbent			This race	
District	Representative	Party	First elected	Results	Candidates
Wyoming at-large	John J. McIntyre	Democratic	1940	Incumbent lost re-election. Republican gain.	▌ ✓ Frank A. Barrett (Republican) 50.7%; ▌John J. McIntyre (Democratic) 49.3%

== Non-voting delegates ==
=== Alaska Territory ===
District	Incumbent			This race	
District	Representative	Party	First elected	Results	Candidates
Alaska Territory at-large	Anthony Dimond	Democratic	1932	Incumbent re-elected.	▌ ✓ Anthony Dimond (Democratic) 77.20%; Uncontested

== See also ==
- 1942 United States elections
  - 1942 United States Senate elections
- 77th United States Congress
- 78th United States Congress

== Sources ==
- Election Statistics - Office of the Clerk
