= William I. Traeger =

American politician and law enforcement official (1880–1935)

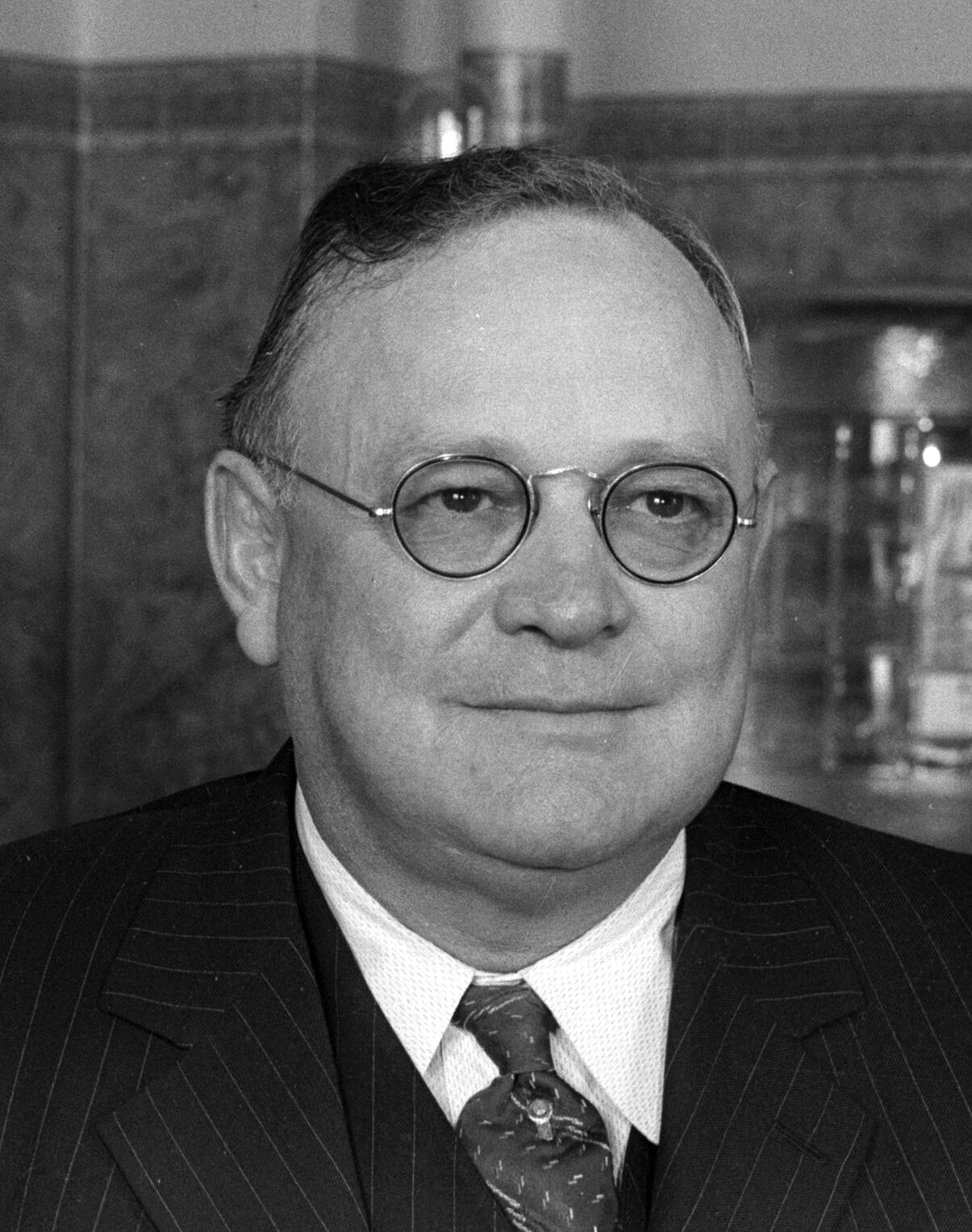
- Traeger in 1933

Member of the U.S. House of Representatives from California's 15th district
- In office March 4, 1933 – January 3, 1935
- Preceded by: Seat established
- Succeeded by: John M. Costello

26th Sheriff of Los Angeles County
- In office 1921–1932
- Preceded by: John C. Cline
- Succeeded by: Eugene W. Biscailuz

Personal details
- Born: William Isham Traeger; February 26, 1880 Porterville, California, U.S.
- Died: January 20, 1935 (aged 54) Los Angeles, California, U.S.
- Resting place: Rosedale Cemetery
- Party: Republican
- Education: Stanford University

William I. Traeger
Playing career
- 1897–1901: Stanford
- Position: Tackle

Coaching career (HC unless noted)
- 1902: Pomona
- 1903: Occidental (assistant)
- 1906: Los Angeles HS (CA)
- 1908: USC

Head coaching record
- Overall: 6–3–1 (college)

William Isham Traeger (February 26, 1880 – January 20, 1935) was an American law enforcement official who served as sheriff of Los Angeles County from 1921 to 1932, and went on to serve one term as a United States representative from California. He was also a college football coach, serving as head football coach at Pomona College in 1902 and the University of Southern California (USC) in 1908.

== Early life ==
Traeger was born in Porterville, California, the oldest of five children of Augustus Traeger, a blacksmith who had migrated from Wisconsin in 1872, and his wife Martha Ellen (Dunn) Traeger, who had migrated from Arkansas in 1874. William attended elementary and high schools in Porterville, also assisting his father in his trade; Martha Traeger died in 1895. Traeger served during the Spanish–American War as a private and corporal in the 6th California Volunteer Infantry from May 11 to December 15, 1898.

== College ==
After the war, Traeger studied law at Stanford University, earning his undergraduate degree in 1901. While there, he starred as a tackle on the football team, kicking a field goal to give Stanford a 5–0 victory over California in the 1900 rivalry game (field goals counted for 5 points until 1904); he was captain of the team that played in the first Rose Bowl Game on January 1, 1902, a game in which he tore his shoulder ligament yet continued to play.

== Coaching and early law enforcement career ==
In 1902 Traeger moved to Los Angeles, where he helped in various athletic departments, leading Pomona College's football team to a 3–2 record in 1902 and coaching at Occidental College the following year. He served as a deputy United States Marshal from April 1903 through 1906 and as a deputy sheriff for Los Angeles County from January 1907 to 1911.

He also worked for a general contracting company. While a deputy marshal, he married Alice Collier, who died in 1908 from tuberculosis.

== Law school and USC coaching ==
Traeger attended law school at the University of Southern California. During his time at USC, he served as the head coach of the USC football team for the 1908 season; USC's teams were still called the Methodists before becoming known as the Trojans in 1912. He compiled a 3–1–1 record while coaching at USC; the schedule was entirely against southern California teams, including games against Pomona and Occidental as well as Los Angeles High School, a team he had coached in 1906, and a San Bernardino County athletic club, the only contest outside L.A. County. He was succeeded in 1909 by famous track coach Dean Cromwell.

== Legal career and Sheriff ==
Traeger was admitted to the bar in California in 1909, and began private practice. In 1911, be began serving as deputy clerk for the Supreme Court of California, a position he would hold until 1921. During World War I he enlisted in the Army and served at an officer's training camp.

In 1921, Traeger was appointed Sheriff of Los Angeles County; he was elected to 4-year terms in 1922, 1926 and 1930, serving until December 1932. During his time in office, he reorganized the county jail, established the county's honor camps for first-time misdemeanor offenders, and started the employment contact office which helped prisoners find employment after their release. In 1929 he became the first president of the Los Angeles County Peace Officers' Association.

== Congress ==
In 1932, Traeger was elected as a Republican to the 73rd United States Congress (March 4, 1933 – January 3, 1935) despite the Democratic landslide which occurred that year. He lost his reelection bid to John M. Costello in 1934.

== Death ==
Traeger died at age 54 of a liver disorder at the Wadsworth Hospital in Los Angeles, two weeks after leaving office; he had become ill in late December. He was survived by his second wife, the former Ruth McAllister, a schoolteacher he had married in 1912, and by one daughter from each marriage.

Traeger was interred at Rosedale Cemetery, Los Angeles.

== Electoral history ==
1932 United States House of Representatives elections in California
Party	Candidate	Votes	%
Republican	William I. Traeger	67,390	52.8
Democratic	John M. Costello	57,518	45.1
No party	Errol Shour (write-in)	2,721	2.1
Total votes		127,663	100.0
Turnout			
Republican win (new seat)			

1934 United States House of Representatives elections in California
Party	Candidate	Votes	%
Democratic	John M. Costello	67,247	50.5
Republican	William I. Traeger (Incumbent)	65,858	49.5
Total votes		133,161	100.0
Turnout			
Democratic gain from Republican			

== Head coaching record ==
=== College ===
Year	Team	Overall	Conference	Standing	Bowl/playoffs
Pomona Sagehens (Independent) (1902)
1902	Pomona	3–2			
Pomona:		3–2			
USC Methodists (Independent) (1908)
1908	USC	3–1–1			
USC:		3–1–1			
Total:		6–3–1			

Police appointments
Preceded by John C. Cline	Sheriff of Los Angeles County; 1921–1932	Succeeded by Eugene W. Biscailuz
U.S. House of Representatives
Preceded by District created	Member of the U.S. House of Representatives from California's 15th congressional district 1933–1935	Succeeded by John M. Costello
