= 1932 United States House of Representatives elections in California =

United States House of Representatives elections in California, 1932
- November 8, 1932

All 20 California seats to the United States House of Representatives
	Majority party	Minority party
Party	Democratic	Republican
Last election	1	10
Seats won	11	9
Seat change	▲10	▼1
Popular vote	849,270	941,668
Percentage	45.3%	50.2%
- Democratic gain Republican gain Democratic hold Republican hold

The United States House of Representatives elections in California, 1932 was an election for California's delegation to the United States House of Representatives, which occurred as part of the general election of the House of Representatives on November 8, 1932. This election began the transition of California from a solidly Republican state to a swing state, which it would be for the next 60 years. California gained nine seats as a result of the 1930 census; it would have been six if the House seats were reapportioned in 1920 since California would have had 14 seats as a result of the 1920 census. Democrats won six of those seats while Republicans won three. Of California's existing seats, Democrats won four Republican-held seats.

== Overview ==
United States House of Representatives elections in California, 1932
Party	Votes	Percentage	Seats	+/–
Republican	941,668	50.24%	9	-1
Democratic	849,270	45.31%	11	+10
Socialist	34,370	1.83%	0	0
Liberty	27,595	1.47%	0	0
Independent	11,120	0.59%	0	0
Prohibition	10,308	0.55%	0	0
Totals	1,874,331	100.00%	20	+9

== Delegation composition ==
Pre-election	Seats
Republican-Held	10
Democratic-Held	1

Post-election	Seats
Democratic-Held	11
Republican-Held	9

== Results ==
Final results from the Clerk of the House of Representatives:

=== District 1 ===
California's 1st congressional district election, 1932
Party	Candidate	Votes	%
Democratic	Clarence F. Lea (incumbent)	73,400	100.0
Turnout			
Democratic hold			

=== District 2 ===
California's 2nd congressional district election, 1932
Party	Candidate	Votes	%
Republican	Harry Lane Englebright (incumbent)	43,146	100.0
Turnout			
Republican hold			

=== District 3 ===
California's 3rd congressional district election, 1932
Party	Candidate	Votes	%
Democratic	Frank H. Buck	61,694	56.8
Republican	Charles F. Curry (incumbent)	46,887	45.2
Total votes		108,581	100.0
Turnout			
Democratic gain from Republican			

=== District 4 ===
California's 4th congressional district election, 1932
Party	Candidate	Votes	%
Republican	Florence Prag Kahn (incumbent)	67,425	85.3
Socialist	Milen C. Dempster	11,603	14.7
Total votes		79,028	100.0
Turnout			
Republican hold			

=== District 5 ===
California's 5th congressional district election, 1932
Party	Candidate	Votes	%
Republican	Richard J. Welch (incumbent)	67,349	100.0
Turnout			
Republican hold			

=== District 6 ===
California's 6th congressional district election, 1932
Party	Candidate	Votes	%
Republican	Albert E. Carter (incumbent)	75,528	100.0
Turnout			
Republican hold			

=== District 7 ===
California's 7th congressional district election, 1932
Party	Candidate	Votes	%
Republican	Ralph R. Eltse	45,944	45.5
Democratic	Frank V. Cornish	32,365	32.0
Socialist	J. Stitt Wilson	22,767	22.5
Total votes		101,076	100.0
Turnout			
Republican win (new seat)			

=== District 8 ===
California's 8th congressional district election, 1932
Party	Candidate	Votes	%
Democratic	John J. McGrath	65,455	56.9
Republican	Arthur M. Free (incumbent)	49,487	43.1
Total votes		114,942	100.0
Turnout			
Democratic gain from Republican			

=== District 9 ===
California's 9th congressional district election, 1932
Party	Candidate	Votes	%
Democratic	Denver S. Church	50,125	61.6
Republican	Henry E. Barbour (incumbent)	31,209	38.4
Total votes		81,334	100.0
Turnout			
Democratic gain from Republican			

=== District 10 ===
California's 10th congressional district election, 1932
Party	Candidate	Votes	%
Democratic	Henry E. Stubbs	50,390	55.3
Republican	Arthur S. Crites	40,794	44.7
Total votes		91,184	100.0
Turnout			
Democratic win (new seat)			

=== District 11 ===
California's 11th congressional district election, 1932
Party	Candidate	Votes	%
Republican	William E. Evans (incumbent)	57,739	51.8
Democratic	Albert D. Hadley	38,240	34.3
Liberty	Marshall V. Hartranft	15,520	13.9
Total votes		111,499	100.0
Turnout			
Republican hold			

=== District 12 ===
California's 12th congressional district election, 1932
Party	Candidate	Votes	%
Democratic	John H. Hoeppel	43,122	45.8
Republican	Frederick F. Houser	40,674	43.2
Prohibition	Richard M. Cannon	10,308	11.0
Total votes		94,104	100.0
Turnout			
Democratic win (new seat)			

=== District 13 ===
California's 13th congressional district election, 1932
Party	Candidate	Votes	%
Democratic	Charles Kramer	65,261	52.7
Republican	Charles H. Randall	53,449	43.1
Liberty	George D. Higgins	5,237	4.2
Total votes		123,947	100.0
Turnout			
Democratic win (new seat)			

=== District 14 ===
California's 14th congressional district election, 1932
Party	Candidate	Votes	%
Democratic	Thomas F. Ford	47,368	57.1
Republican	William D. Campbell	35,598	42.9
Total votes		82,966	100.0
Turnout			
Democratic win (new seat)			

=== District 15 ===
California's 15th congressional district election, 1932
Party	Candidate	Votes	%
Republican	William I. Traeger	67,390	52.8
Democratic	John M. Costello	57,518	45.1
Independent	Errol O. Shour (write-in)	2,721	2.1
Total votes		127,629	100.0
Turnout			
Republican win (new seat)			

=== District 16 ===
California's 16th congressional district election, 1932
Party	Candidate	Votes	%
Democratic	John F. Dockweiler	70,333	54.9
Republican	Clyde Woodworth	57,718	45.1
Total votes		128,051	100.0
Turnout			
Democratic gain from Republican			

=== District 17 ===
California's 17th congressional district election, 1932
Party	Candidate	Votes	%
Democratic	Charles J. Colden	50,720	62.2
Republican	A. E. Henning	26,868	32.9
Liberty	Ernest E. Debs	3,965	4.9
Total votes		81,553	100.0
Turnout			
Democratic win (new seat)			

=== District 18 ===
California's 18th congressional district election, 1932
Party	Candidate	Votes	%
Democratic	John H. Burke	48,179	53.3
Republican	Robert Henderson	33,817	37.4
Independent	William E. Hinshaw	8,399	9.3
Total votes		90,395	100.0
Turnout			
Democratic win (new seat)			

=== District 19 ===
California's 19th congressional district election, 1932
Party	Candidate	Votes	%
Republican	Sam L. Collins	56,889	51.0
Democratic	B. Z. McKinney	51,796	46.4
Liberty	Horatio S. Hoard	2,873	2.6
Total votes		111,558	100.0
Turnout			
Republican win (new seat)			

=== District 20 ===
California's 20th congressional district election, 1932
Party	Candidate	Votes	%
Republican	George Burnham (incumbent)	43,757	50.3
Democratic	Claude Chandler	43,304	49.7
Total votes		87,061	100.0
Turnout			
Republican hold			

== See also ==
- 73rd United States Congress
- Political party strength in California
- Political party strength in U.S. states
- 1932 United States House of Representatives elections
