= 1934 United States House of Representatives elections in California =

United States House of Representatives elections in California, 1934
- November 6, 1934

All 20 California seats to the United States House of Representatives
| | Majority party | Minority party |
|---|---|---|
| Party | Democratic | Republican |
| Last election | 11 | 9 |
| Seats won | 13 | 7 |
| Seat change | ▲2 | ▼2 |
| Popular vote | 1,041,557 | 963,821 |
| Percentage | 50.2% | 46.5% |
- Democratic gain Republican gain Democratic hold Republican hold

The United States House of Representatives elections in California, 1934 was an election for California's delegation to the United States House of Representatives, which occurred as part of the general election of the House of Representatives on November 6, 1934. Democrats gained three districts while losing one.

== Overview ==
United States House of Representatives elections in California, 1934
| Party | Votes | Percentage | Seats | +/– |
|---|---|---|---|---|
| Democratic | 1,041,557 | 50.2% | 13 | +2 |
| Republican | 963,821 | 46.5% | 7 | -2 |
| Socialist | 18,890 | 0.9% | 0 | 0 |
| Prohibition | 18,760 | 0.9% | 0 | 0 |
| Independent | 12,301 | 0.6% | 0 | 0 |
| Communist | 11,771 | 0.6% | 0 | 0 |
| Progressive | 6,123 | 0.3% | 0 | 0 |
| Totals | 2,073,223 | 100.0% | 20 | — |

== Delegation composition ==
| Pre-election | Seats |
| Democratic-Held | 11 |
| Republican-Held | 9 |

| Post-election | Seats |
| Democratic-Held | 13 |
| Republican-Held | 7 |

== Results ==
Final results from the Clerk of the House of Representatives:

=== District 1 ===
California's 1st congressional district election, 1934
| Party | Candidate | Votes | % |
|---|---|---|---|
| Democratic | Clarence F. Lea (incumbent) | 98,661 | 93.6 |
| Socialist | Allen K. Gifford | 6,698 | 6.4 |
| Total votes | | 105,359 | 100.0 |
| Turnout | | | |
| Democratic hold | | | |

=== District 2 ===
California's 2nd congressional district election, 1934
| Party | Candidate | Votes | % |
|---|---|---|---|
| Republican | Harry Lane Englebright (incumbent) | 66,370 | 100.0 |
| Turnout | | | |
| Republican hold | | | |

=== District 3 ===
California's 3rd congressional district election, 1934
| Party | Candidate | Votes | % |
|---|---|---|---|
| Democratic | Frank H. Buck (incumbent) | 66,566 | 53.3 |
| Republican | J. M. Inman | 56,222 | 45.7 |
| Communist | Albert Hougardy | 1,167 | 1.0 |
| Total votes | | 122,955 | 100.0 |
| Turnout | | | |
| Democratic hold | | | |

=== District 4 ===
California's 4th congressional district election, 1934
| Party | Candidate | Votes | % |
|---|---|---|---|
| Republican | Florence Prag Kahn (incumbent) | 50,491 | 48.0 |
| Democratic | Chauncey Tramutolo | 46,871 | 44.5 |
| Progressive Party (United States, 1924) | Raymond A. Burr | 3,636 | 3.5 |
| Socialist | Samuel S. White | 2,414 | 2.3 |
| Communist | Minnie Carson | 1,810 | 1.7 |
| Total votes | | 105,222 | 100.0 |
| Turnout | | | |
| Republican hold | | | |

=== District 5 ===
California's 5th congressional district election, 1934
| Party | Candidate | Votes | % |
|---|---|---|---|
| Republican | Richard J. Welch (incumbent) | 89,751 | 93.8 |
| Communist | Alexander Noral | 5,933 | 6.2 |
| Total votes | | 95,684 | 100.0 |
| Turnout | | | |
| Republican hold | | | |

=== District 6 ===
California's 6th congressional district election, 1934
| Party | Candidate | Votes | % |
|---|---|---|---|
| Republican | Albert E. Carter (incumbent) | 93,213 | 100.0 |
| Turnout | | | |
| Republican hold | | | |

=== District 7 ===
California's 7th congressional district election, 1934
| Party | Candidate | Votes | % |
|---|---|---|---|
| Democratic | John H. Tolan | 51,962 | 52.3 |
| Republican | Ralph R. Eltse (incumbent) | 47,414 | 47.7 |
| Total votes | | 99,376 | 100.0 |
| Turnout | | | |
| Democratic gain from Republican | | | |

=== District 8 ===
California's 8th congressional district election, 1934
| Party | Candidate | Votes | % |
|---|---|---|---|
| Democratic | John J. McGrath (incumbent) | 107,325 | 100.0 |
| Turnout | | | |
| Democratic hold | | | |

=== District 9 ===
California's 9th congressional district election, 1934
| Party | Candidate | Votes | % |
|---|---|---|---|
| Republican | Bertrand W. Gearhart | 77,650 | 100.0 |
| Turnout | | | |
| Republican gain from Democratic | | | |

=== District 10 ===
California's 10th congressional district election, 1934
| Party | Candidate | Votes | % |
|---|---|---|---|
| Democratic | Henry E. Stubbs (incumbent) | 68,475 | 64.4 |
| Republican | George R. Bliss | 37,860 | 35.6 |
| Total votes | | 106,335 | 100.0 |
| Turnout | | | |
| Democratic hold | | | |

=== District 11 ===
California's 11th congressional district election, 1934
| Party | Candidate | Votes | % |
|---|---|---|---|
| Democratic | John S. McGroarty | 66,999 | 53.5 |
| Republican | William E. Evans (incumbent) | 56,350 | 45.0 |
| Socialist | William E. Stephenson | 1,814 | 1.5 |
| Total votes | | 125,163 | 100.0 |
| Turnout | | | |
| Democratic gain from Republican | | | |

=== District 12 ===
California's 12th congressional district election, 1934
| Party | Candidate | Votes | % |
|---|---|---|---|
| Democratic | John H. Hoeppel (incumbent) | 52,595 | 50.7 |
| Republican | Frederick F. Houser | 51,216 | 49.3 |
| Total votes | | 103,811 | 100.0 |
| Turnout | | | |
| Democratic hold | | | |

=== District 13 ===
California's 13th congressional district election, 1934
| Party | Candidate | Votes | % |
|---|---|---|---|
| Democratic | Charles Kramer (incumbent) | 83,384 | 62.5 |
| Republican | Thomas K. Case | 27,993 | 21.0 |
| Prohibition | Charles H. Randall | 18,760 | 14.1 |
| Socialist | Michael S. Kerrigan | 2,113 | 1.6 |
| Communist | John J. Graham | 1,268 | 0.9 |
| Total votes | | 133,518 | 100.0 |
| Turnout | | | |
| Democratic hold | | | |

=== District 14 ===
California's 14th congressional district election, 1934
| Party | Candidate | Votes | % |
|---|---|---|---|
| Democratic | Thomas F. Ford (incumbent) | 52,761 | 61.0 |
| Republican | William D. Campbell | 33,945 | 37.1 |
| Progressive Party (United States, 1924) | Lyndon R. Foster | 2,487 | 2.7 |
| Socialist | Harry Sherr | 1,130 | 1.2 |
| Communist | Lawrence Ross | 1,086 | 1.2 |
| Total votes | | 91,409 | 100.0 |
| Turnout | | | |
| Democratic hold | | | |

=== District 15 ===
California's 15th congressional district election, 1934
| Party | Candidate | Votes | % |
|---|---|---|---|
| Democratic | John M. Costello | 67,247 | 50.6 |
| Republican | William I. Traeger (incumbent) | 65,858 | 49.4 |
| Total votes | | 133,105 | 100.0 |
| Turnout | | | |
| Democratic gain from Republican | | | |

=== District 16 ===
California's 16th congressional district election, 1934
| Party | Candidate | Votes | % |
|---|---|---|---|
| Democratic | John F. Dockweiler (incumbent) | 119,332 | 100.0 |
| Turnout | | | |
| Democratic hold | | | |

=== District 17 ===
California's 17th congressional district election, 1934
| Party | Candidate | Votes | % |
|---|---|---|---|
| Democratic | Charles J. Colden (incumbent) | 60,045 | 70.4 |
| Republican | C. P. "Cap" Wright | 20,508 | 24.0 |
| Socialist | Richard Pomeroy | 4,721 | 5.6 |
| Total votes | | 85,274 | 100.0 |
| Turnout | | | |
| Democratic hold | | | |

=== District 18 ===
California's 18th congressional district election, 1934
| Party | Candidate | Votes | % |
|---|---|---|---|
| Democratic | Byron N. Scott | 52,377 | 56.3 |
| Republican | William Brayton | 40,179 | 43.2 |
| Communist | Clyde Champion | 507 | 0.5 |
| Total votes | | 93,063 | 100.0 |
| Turnout | | | |
| Democratic hold | | | |

=== District 19 ===
California's 19th congressional district election, 1934
| Party | Candidate | Votes | % |
|---|---|---|---|
| Republican | Sam L. Collins (incumbent) | 97,119 | 88.8 |
| Independent | A. B. Hillabold (write-in) | 12,301 | 11.2 |
| Total votes | | 109,420 | 100.0 |
| Turnout | | | |
| Republican hold | | | |

=== District 20 ===
California's 20th congressional district election, 1934
| Party | Candidate | Votes | % |
|---|---|---|---|
| Republican | George Burnham (incumbent) | 51,682 | 52.4 |
| Democratic | Edouard Izac | 46,957 | 47.6 |
| Total votes | | 98,639 | 100.0 |
| Turnout | | | |
| Republican hold | | | |

== See also ==
- 74th United States Congress
- Political party strength in California
- Political party strength in U.S. states
- 1934 United States House of Representatives elections
