= John M. Costello =

American politician (1903–1976)

John Costello
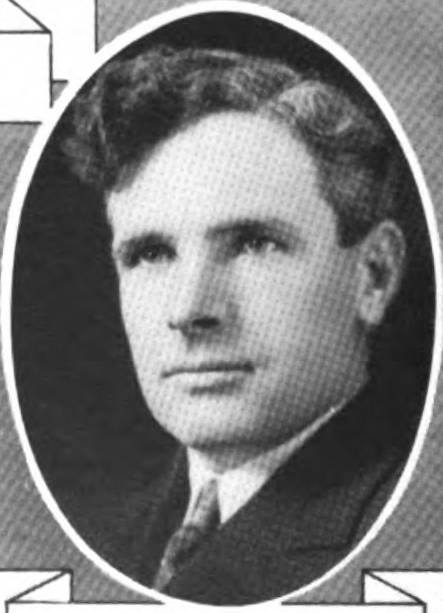

Member of the U.S. House of Representatives from California's 15th district
- In office January 3, 1935 – January 3, 1945
- Preceded by: William I. Traeger
- Succeeded by: Gordon L. McDonough

Personal details
- Born: John Martin Costello; January 15, 1903 Los Angeles, California, United States
- Died: August 28, 1976 (aged 73) Las Vegas, Nevada, United States
- Resting place: Calvary Cemetery, Los Angeles, California
- Party: Democratic
- Education: Loyola College of Los Angeles

John Martin Costello (January 15, 1903 – August 28, 1976) was an American lawyer and politician who served five terms as a U.S. representative from California from 1935 to 1945.

== Early life and career ==
Born in Los Angeles, California, the son of Irish immigrants, Costello attended the public schools. He was graduated from Loyola Law School, Los Angeles, California, in 1924. He was admitted to the bar the same year and commenced practice in Los Angeles. He was a teacher in Los Angeles secondary schools in 1924 and 1925.

== Political career ==
He was an unsuccessful candidate for election to the Seventy-third Congress in 1932.

=== Congress ===
Costello was elected as a Democrat to the Seventy-fourth and to the four succeeding Congresses (January 3, 1935 – January 3, 1945). He was an unsuccessful candidate for renomination in 1944 to the Seventy-ninth Congress.

== Later career ==
He served as general counsel and manager of the Washington office of the Los Angeles Chamber of Commerce from 1945 to 1947. He engaged in the practice of law in Washington, D.C. from 1947 to 1976.

== Death ==
He died in Las Vegas, Nevada, August 28, 1976. He was interred in Calvary Cemetery, Los Angeles, California.

== Electoral history ==
1932 United States House of Representatives elections in California
Party	Candidate	Votes	%
Republican	William I. Traeger	67,390	52.8
Democratic	John M. Costello	57,518	45.1
No party	Errol Shour (write-in)	2,721	2.1
Total votes		127,663	100.0
Turnout			
Republican win (new seat)			

1934 United States House of Representatives elections in California
Party	Candidate	Votes	%
Democratic	John M. Costello	67,247	50.5
Republican	William I. Traeger (Incumbent)	65,858	49.5
Total votes		133,161	100.0
Turnout			
Democratic gain from Republican			

1936 United States House of Representatives elections in California
Party	Candidate	Votes	%
Democratic	John M. Costello (Incumbent)	99,107	69.0
Republican	Ernest Sawyer	44,559	31.0
Total votes		143,718	100.0
Turnout			
Democratic hold			

1938 United States House of Representatives elections in California
Party	Candidate	Votes	%
Democratic	John M. Costello (Incumbent)	83,086	60.1
Republican	O. D. Thomas	51,483	37.3
Communist	Emil Freed	2,951	2.1
Total votes		138,132	100.0
Turnout			
Democratic hold			

1940 United States House of Representatives elections in California
Party	Candidate	Votes	%
Democratic	John M. Costello (Incumbent)	94,435	56.2
Republican	Norris Nelson	71,667	42.6
Communist	Emil Freed	2,004	1.2
Total votes		168,155	100.0
Turnout			
Democratic hold			

1942 United States House of Representatives elections in California
Party	Candidate	Votes	%
Democratic	John M. Costello (Incumbent)	88,798	86.1
Prohibition	B. Tarkington Dowden	10,185	9.9
Communist	Philip Gardner	3,989	3.9
Total votes		103,094	100.0
Turnout			
Democratic hold			

== See also ==
- List of members of the House Un-American Activities Committee

U.S. House of Representatives
Preceded by William I. Traeger	Member of the U.S. House of Representatives from California's 15th congressional district 1935–1945	Succeeded by Gordon L. McDonough
