= 1940 United States House of Representatives election in New Mexico =

1940 United States House election in New Mexico
- November 5, 1940
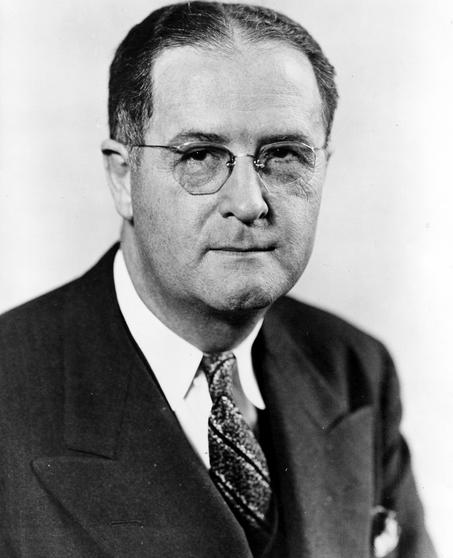

| Nominee | Clinton Anderson | Herman R. Crile |
| Party | Democratic | Republican |
| Popular vote | 106,972 | 75,085 |
| Percentage | 58.8% | 41.2% |
- County results Anderson: 50–60% 60–70% 70–80% Crile: 50–60%
Representative
At-large before election
John J. Dempsey
Democratic
Elected Representative
At-large
Clinton Anderson
Democratic

The 1940 United States House of Representatives election in New Mexico was held on Tuesday November 5, 1940 to elect the state's at-large representative to serve in the 77th United States Congress. Incumbent John J. Dempsey chose to run for the US Senate instead of seeking a fourth term in congress. Clinton Anderson won the open seat by 17.52% outperforming Franklin D. Roosevelt in the concurrent Presidential election by 4.21 percentage points.

== Results ==
New Mexico At-large congressional district election, 1940
| Party | Candidate | Votes | % |
|---|---|---|---|
| Democratic | Clinton Anderson | 106,972 | 58.76 |
| Republican | Herman R. Crile | 75,085 | 41.24 |
| Total votes | | 182,057 | 100.00 |
| Democratic hold | | | |
