= 1934 New York state election =

- November 6, 1934

The 1934 New York State Election was held on November 6, 1934, to elect the governor, the lieutenant governor, the state comptroller, the attorney general, a U.S. senator, two U.S. representatives-at-large, the chief judge and two associate judges of the New York Court of Appeals, as well as all members of the New York State Assembly and the New York State Senate.

== History ==
The Communist State Committee met on August 28, and nominated Israel Amter for governor.

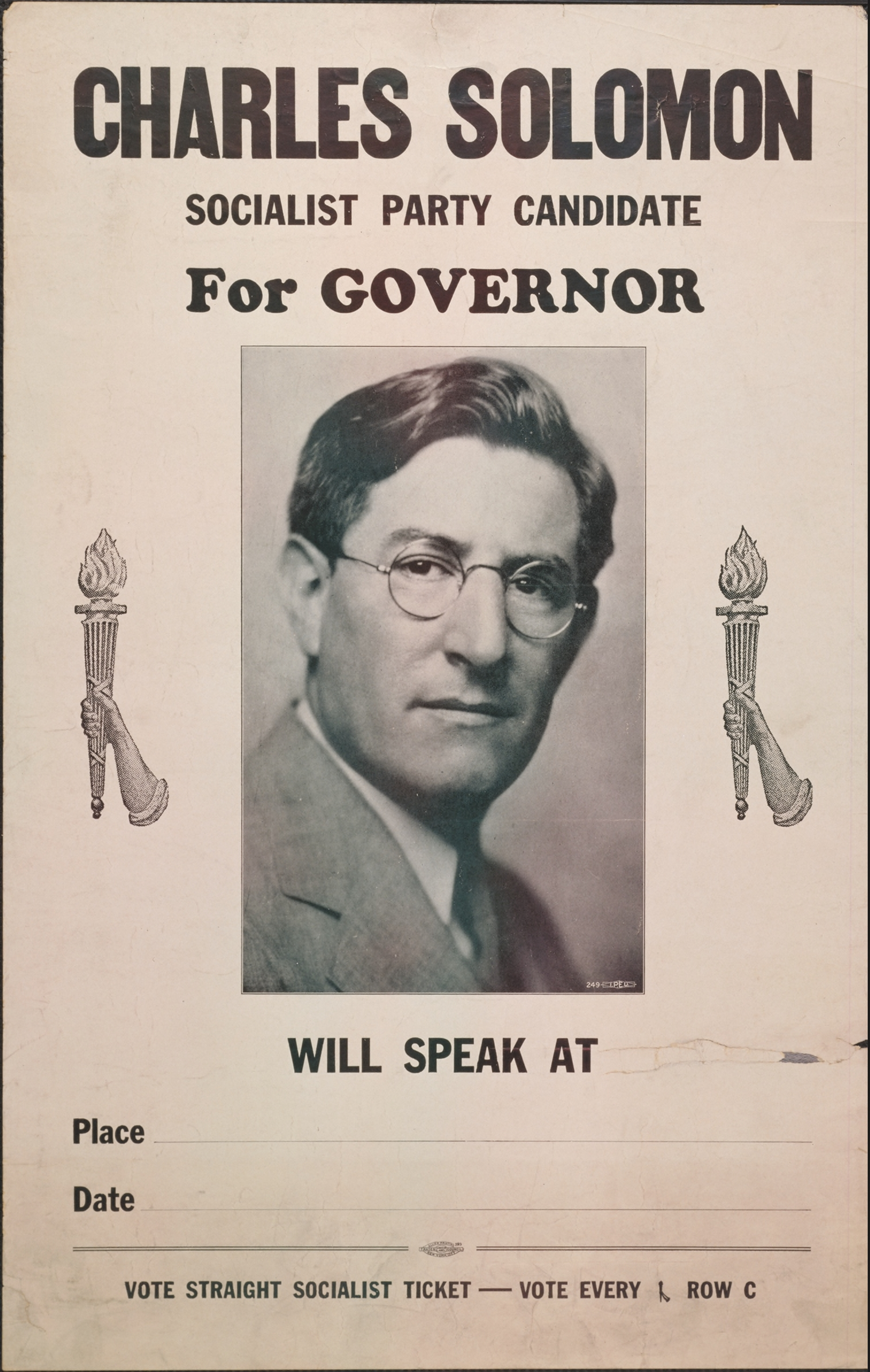
Socialist Party campaign poster featuring Charles Solomon as a candidate for governor

The Socialist state convention met on July 1 at New York City, and nominated Charles Solomon for governor; and Norman Thomas for the U.S. Senate.

The Democratic state convention met on September 27 at Buffalo, New York, and re-nominated the incumbents Lehman, Bray, Tremaine, Bennett, Loughran and Copeland; and completed the ticket endorsing two Republicans: Associate Judge Frederick E. Crane for Chief Judge and Supreme Court Justice Edward R. Finch for the Court of Appeals.

The Republican state convention met on September 28 at Rochester, New York, and nominated New York City Park Commissioner Robert Moses for Governor on the third ballot after a struggle with the Macy faction, defeating Samuel Seabury and Seabury C. Mastick. Also nominated were Fred J. Douglas for Lieutenant Governor, Wilson R. Campbell, of Steuben County, for Comptroller, William T. Powers, of Brooklyn, for Attorney General, E. Harold Cluett for the U.S. Senate, Frederick E. Crane for Chief Judge, the incumbent Democrat John T. Loughran to succeed himself, and Charles B. Sears for the Court of Appeals, thus dropping fellow Republican Edward R. Finch who had been nominated by the Democrats in a common cross-endorsement deal for judicial officers.

The "Recovery Party" filed a petition to nominate state officers on October 9, 1934. The ticket was headed by Ex-Mayor of New York John F. Hylan for Governor. The ticket was not allowed on the ballot because of numerous forged signatures and thus not meeting the legal requirements. Hylan did receive 15,208 write-in votes in New York City according to NYC Board of Elections records, but these were included in the state total of blank, void and scattering votes (141,700).

The "Constitutional Party" nominated Colonel Henry Breckinridge, a Democrat who opposed President Franklin D. Roosevelt's New Deal policy, for the U.S. Senate, and used the "Pine Tree of Liberty" as its emblem on the ballot.

== Result ==
The whole Democratic ticket was elected in the third landslide in a row. The incumbents, Lehman, Bray, Tremaine, Bennett, Loughran, and Copeland, were re-elected.

The Law Preservation Party lost its automatic ballot access and disappeared.

1934 state election results
| Office | Democratic ticket | | Republican ticket | | Socialist ticket | | Communist ticket | | Constitutional ticket | | Law Preservation ticket | | Socialist Labor ticket | |
|---|---|---|---|---|---|---|---|---|---|---|---|---|---|---|
| Governor | Herbert H. Lehman | 2,201,729 | Robert Moses | 1,393,638 | Charles Solomon | 126,580 | Israel Amter | 45,878 | (none) | | William F. Varney | 20,449 | Aaron M. Orange | 7,225 |
| Lieutenant Governor | M. William Bray | 2,078,177 | Fred J. Douglas | 1,419,577 | Herman Kobbe | 133,387 | Williana J. Burroughs | 48,709 | (none) | | James F. Luckey | 17,393 | Emil F. Teichert | 7,226 |
| Comptroller | Morris S. Tremaine | 2,066,118 | Wilson R. Campbell | 1,402,295 | Fred Sander | 136,632 | Rose Wortis | 48,577 | (none) | | Fred C. Foster | 17,133 | O. Martin Olson | 7,551 |
| Attorney General | John J. Bennett Jr. | 2,072,504 | William T. Powers | 1,399,025 | William Karlin | 137,403 | Fred Briehl | 49,696 | (none) | | Joseph S. Robinson | 17,872 | Simeon Bickwheat | 7,081 |
| Chief Judge | Frederick E. Crane | 3,422,854 | Frederick E. Crane | | Jacob Hillquit | 153,194 | Richard B. Moore | 50,608 | (none) | | Frederick E. Crane | | | |
| Judge of the Court of Appeals | John T. Loughran | 3,349,738 | John T. Loughran | | Darwin J. Meserole | 135,856 | Gertrude Welsh | 55,664 | (none) | | John T. Loughran | | | |
| Judge of the Court of Appeals | Edward R. Finch | 1,977,863 | Charles B. Sears | 1,405,688 | Julian H. Weiss | 150,470 | | | (none) | | David E. Hartshorn | 19,922 | | |
| U.S. Senator | Royal S. Copeland | 2,046,377 | E. Harold Cluett | 1,363,440 | Norman Thomas | 194,952 | Max Bedacht | 45,396 | Henry Breckinridge | 24,241 | William Sheafe Chase | 16,769 | Olive M. Johnson | 6,622 |
| U.S. Representative-at-large | Matthew J. Merritt | 1,952,939 | William B. Groat Jr. | 1,387,460 | Charles W. Noonan | 141,799 | Henry Shepard | 48,851 | (none) | | William E. Barron | 16,770 | Jeremiah D. Crowley | 7,529 |
| U.S. Representative-at-large | Caroline O'Day | 1,978,680 | Natalie F. Couch | 1,417,271 | August Claessens | 138,878 | Emanuel Levin | 47,812 | (none) | | Dorothy Frooks | 19,853 | Jacob Berlin | 6,701 |

== See also ==
- New York gubernatorial elections
- New York state elections

== Sources ==
- Result (Law Preservation only): Vote for Prohibition candidates at Prohibitionists.org
- Official Result: DRY PARTY LOSES PLACE ON BALLOT in NYT on December 11, 1934
- New York Red Book 1935
