= Joseph J. Bartlett =

United States Army general and diplomat (1834–1893)

Joseph Jackson Bartlett
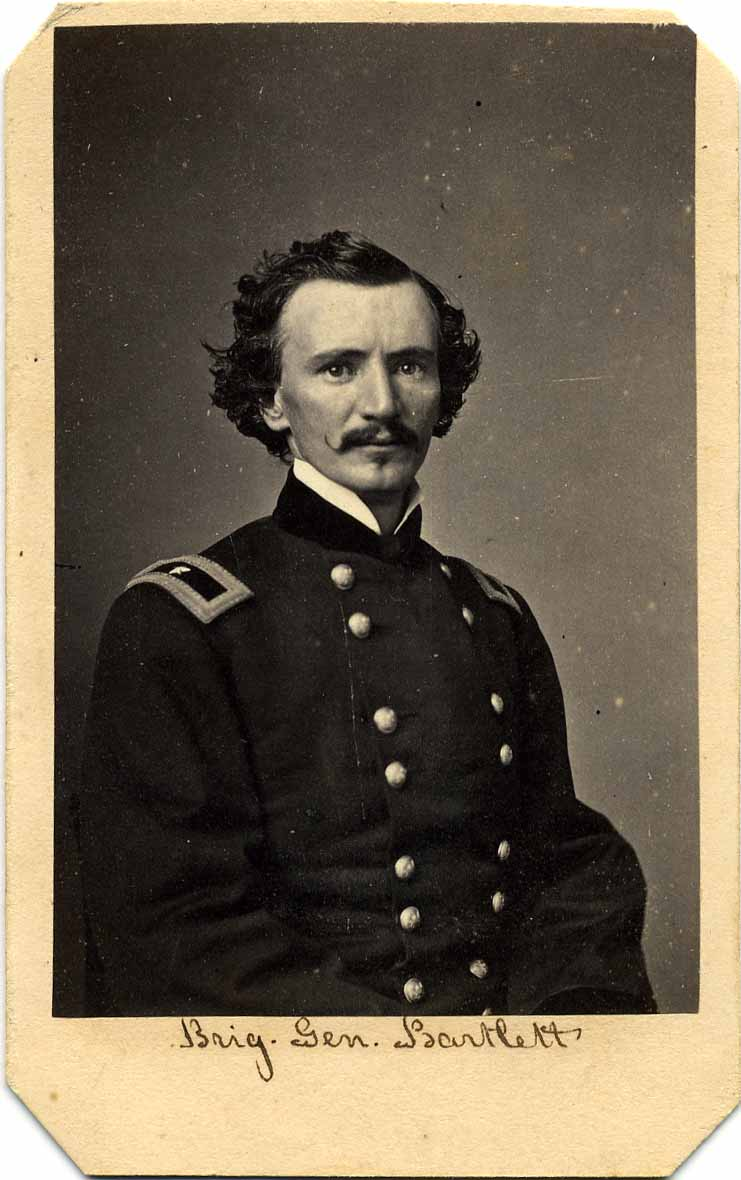
- Born: November 21, 1834; Binghamton, New York, US
- Died: January 14, 1893 (aged 58); Baltimore, Maryland, US
- Burial place: Arlington National Cemetery
- Military career
- Allegiance: United States; Union
- Branch: United States Army; Union Army
- Service years: 1861–1866
- Rank: Brigadier General; Brevet Major General
- Commands: 27th New York Volunteer Infantry Regiment
- Conflicts: American Civil War; First Battle of Bull Run; Peninsula Campaign; Seven Days Battles; Battle of South Mountain; Battle of Antietam; Battle of Fredericksburg; Battle of Chancellorsville; Battle of Salem Church; Battle of Gettysburg; Mine Run Campaign; Battle of the Wilderness; Battle of Spotsylvania Court House; Battle of Cold Harbor; Siege of Petersburg; Appomattox Campaign

Joseph Jackson Bartlett (November 21, 1834 – January 14, 1893) was a New York attorney, brigadier general in the Union Army during the American Civil War, and postbellum international diplomat and pensions administrator for the United States Government. He was chosen to receive the stacked arms of General Robert E. Lee's Army of Northern Virginia at Appomattox Court House.

== Early life and career ==
Bartlett was born in Binghamton, New York, to gunmaker Joseph Bartlett. He was educated in a local academy, and then studied law in Utica. He passed his bar examination in 1858 and initially established his practice in Binghamton before moving it to Elmira shortly before the Civil War erupted in 1861.

== Civil War ==
On May 21, 1861, Bartlett enlisted in the volunteer army in the 27th New York Infantry at Elmira. He was initially elected as a captain of one of the newly raised companies, and was soon elevated to major, serving under the regiment's first colonel, Henry W. Slocum. After only a few weeks of training, Bartlett and the regiment saw their first combat the First Battle of Bull Run in Virginia. When Slocum was briefly incapacitated by a wound, Bartlett assumed command of the 27th New York for the rest of the fight. His aggressive actions to guard the rear during the subsequent retreat were rewarded on September 21 when army commander Maj. Gen. Irvin McDowell promoted Bartlett to colonel replacing Slocum, who was elevated to brigadier general.

In 1862, as part of the Army of the Potomac's VI Corps, Bartlett led his regiment throughout the Peninsular Campaign and the Maryland Campaign. He led a determined attack up the steep mountainside towards Crampton's Gap during the Battle of South Mountain. On October 4, 1862, Bartlett was promoted to the rank of brigadier general and assigned command of an infantry brigade in the VI Corps. His appointment as a general expired in March 1863 without Congressional approval, but he was soon reappointed to the rank.

Bartlett's next significant combat came in May 1863 at the Battle of Salem Church, where he lost more than a third of his 1,500 men, yet managed to keep order. His men were primarily in reserve at the Battle of Gettysburg. Bartlett was transferred to V Corps in time for the Mine Run Campaign later that year, and led its first division in the absence of BG Charles Griffin. Resuming command of a brigade in that division afterwards; in 1864 Bartlett was active in the Overland Campaign and the Siege of Petersburg.

During the final year of the war, he led a division during the Appomattox Campaign. When Philip Sheridan removed Major General Gouverneur K. Warren from corps command after the Battle of Five Forks, Griffin became corps commander; and Bartlett was his successor at division level. Bartlett was awarded a brevet promotion to major general in the postwar promotions. Immediately after the war, he briefly commanded a division of the IX Corps.

== Postbellum career ==
Bartlett remained in the army on occupation duty in the South during the early days of Reconstruction. He resigned his commission on January 15, 1866, and returned to his New York law practice. In 1867, President Andrew Johnson appointed him as United States Ambassador to Sweden and Norway. He served for two years, and then returned home in 1869. Bartlett resumed his legal career, which was briefly interrupted from March 1885 through July 1889, when he served as Deputy Commissioner of Pensions under President Grover Cleveland. He suffered for much of his life with rheumatism caused by exposure during the war.

Bartlett died in Baltimore, Maryland, in 1893. He is buried in Arlington National Cemetery in Arlington, Virginia.

The Grand Army of the Republic's post in Binghamton, New York, was named in honor of General Bartlett.

== See also ==
- List of American Civil War generals (Union)
