= Henry Warner Slocum =

American general, politician, railroader and businessman (1827–1894)

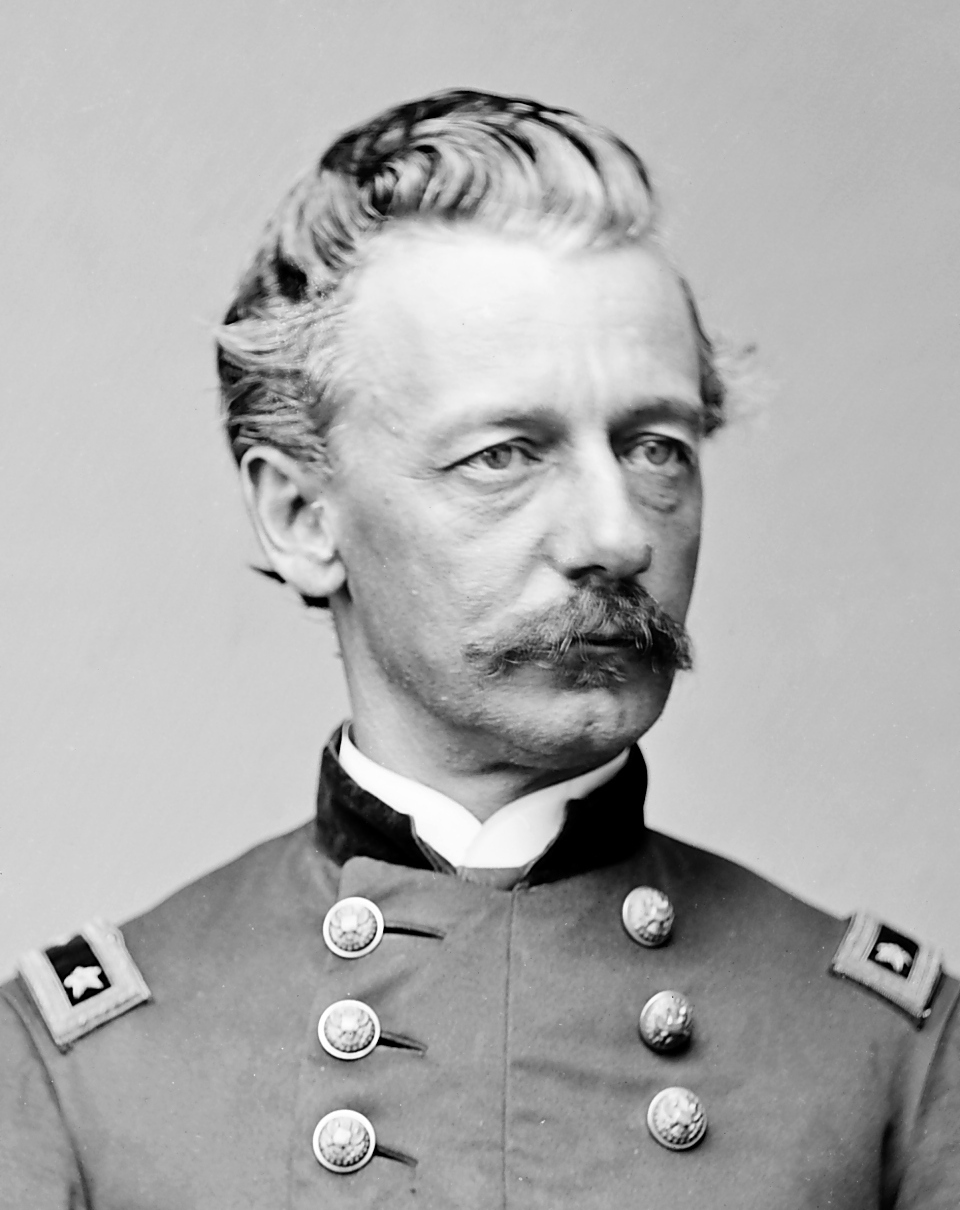
- Portrait of Slocum, c. 1861

Member of the U.S. House of Representatives from New York
- In office March 4, 1883 – March 3, 1885
- Preceded by: Lyman Tremain
- Succeeded by: At-large district temporarily abolished John Fitzgibbons; Elmer E. Studley
- Constituency: at-large seat
- In office March 4, 1869 – March 3, 1873
- Preceded by: William E. Robinson
- Succeeded by: Stewart L. Woodford
- Constituency: 3rd district

Personal details
- Born: September 24, 1827 Delphi Falls, New York, U.S.
- Died: April 14, 1894 (aged 66) Brooklyn, New York, U.S.
- Resting place: Green-Wood Cemetery
- Party: Democratic
- Spouse: Clara Rice (m. 1854)
- Children: 4, including Henry

Military service
- Allegiance: United States; Union
- Branch/service: United States Army; Union Army
- Years of service: 1852–1856; 1861–1865
- Rank: Major General
- Commands: 27th New York Infantry; Brigade Commander, Franklin's Division, I Corps; Divisional Commander, VI Corps; XII Corps; XIV Corps; XX Corps; Army of Georgia
- Battles/wars: Third Seminole War; American Civil War; First Battle of Bull Run; Peninsula campaign; Siege of Yorktown; Battle of Gaines's Mill; Battle of Malvern Hill; Second Battle of Bull Run; Maryland campaign; Battle of South Mountain; Battle of Antietam; Battle of Chancellorsville; Battle of Gettysburg; Atlanta campaign; Savannah campaign; Battle of Bentonville

Henry Warner Slocum Sr. (September 24, 1827 – April 14, 1894), was a Union general during the American Civil War and later served in the United States House of Representatives from New York. During the war, he was one of the youngest major generals in the Army and fought numerous major battles in the Eastern Theater and in Georgia and the Carolinas. While commanding a regiment, a brigade, a division, and a corps in the Army of the Potomac, he saw action at First Bull Run, the Peninsula Campaign, Harpers Ferry, South Mountain, Antietam, and Chancellorsville.

At Gettysburg, he was the senior Union general in the field, under Gen. George G. Meade. During the battle, he held the Union right from Culp's Hill to across the Baltimore Pike. His successful defense of Culp's Hill was crucial to the Union victory at Gettysburg. After the fall of Vicksburg on the Mississippi River, splitting the southern Confederacy, Slocum was appointed military commander of the district. Slocum participated in the Atlanta campaign and was the first commander to enter the city on September 2, 1864. He then served as occupation commander of Atlanta.

Slocum was appointed the commander of the left wing of Gen. William T. Sherman's famous "March to the Sea" to Savannah on the Atlantic coast through Georgia and afterwards turning north through the Carolinas, commanding the XIV and XX Corps, comprising the Army of Georgia. During this campaign, he captured the then state capital of Georgia, Milledgeville, and the Atlantic coast seaport of Savannah.

In the Carolinas campaign, Slocum's army saw victories in the battles of Averasborough and Bentonville, North Carolina. The "March to the Sea" and the Carolinas campaign were crucial to the overall Union victory in the Civil War. After the surrender of Confederate forces, Slocum was given command of the Department of Mississippi. Slocum declined an officer's appointment in the postwar Regular Army. He was a successful political leader in the North, a businessman and railroad developer.

== Early life and career ==
Slocum was born in Delphi Falls, a hamlet in Onondaga County, New York. His father was Matthew B. Slocum, and his mother was Mary Ostrander. He was the sixth of eleven children. He attended the State Normal School in Albany and the Cazenovia Seminary in Madison County. At the age of 16, he received a Public School Teacher's Certificate from the County Superintendent of Schools, and worked occasionally as a teacher for the next five years.

Congressman Daniel Gott appointed Slocum to the United States Military Academy at West Point in 1848, where he did well academically, graduating seventh of 43 in the class of 1852. He tutored his roommate, cadet Philip Sheridan, in mathematics. In his memoirs, Sheridan credited Slocum with helping him pass his examination and graduate from the academy. While at West Point, Slocum expressed opposition to slavery, which was an unpopular position since many of the cadets were from the South.

Slocum was commissioned a second lieutenant in the 1st U.S. Artillery on July 1, 1852. He served in the Seminole War in Florida and at Fort Moultrie in Charleston Harbor, South Carolina. While stationed there, he went on leave to marry Clara Rice in 1854. They had four children including Henry. Slocum was promoted to first lieutenant on March 3, 1855. He resigned his commission October 31, 1856, and settled in Syracuse, New York.

While serving in the army, Slocum studied law under B. C. Presley, who was later elected Supreme Court Justice of South Carolina. Slocum was admitted to the bar in 1858 and practiced in Syracuse. He served as the county treasurer and was a member of the New York State Assembly (Onondaga Co., 2nd D.) in 1859. During this period he also served as an artillery instructor in the New York Militia with the rank of colonel.

== Civil War ==
=== Early commands ===
At the outbreak of the Civil War, Slocum was appointed colonel of the 27th New York Infantry Regiment, which was a two-year regiment mustered in at Elmira, New York. He led the regiment at First Bull Run, where it was in the thick of the fighting, losing 130 men. Slocum himself was badly wounded, and after recuperating, he got command of a brigade in General William B. Franklin's division in the Army of the Potomac. When Franklin became commander of the new VI Corps in May 1862, Slocum took over command of the division, leading it with distinction during the Seven Days Battles. General Fitz-John Porter complimented Slocum's division in the Virginia campaigns as "one of the best divisions in the Army."

On July 25, 1862, Slocum was promoted to major general of volunteers to rank from July 4, the second youngest man in the Army to achieve that rank. The VI Corps stayed in Washington D.C. during the Northern Virginia Campaign, although one of Slocum's brigades was sent down to Bull Run and attacked and routed by the Confederates on August 26. At Crampton's Gap during the Battle of South Mountain on September 14, 1862, Slocum assaulted the enemy line behind a stone wall and routed it. Maj. Gen. William B. Franklin, corps commander, described the victory as "the completest victory gained up to that time by any part of the Army of the Potomac."

At Antietam, Slocum's division was not significantly engaged. The following month, he was named permanent commander of the XII Corps, which had lost its commander, General Joseph K. Mansfield at Antietam. During the Fredericksburg Campaign, Slocum and the XII Corps were stationed around Harper's Ferry and had no involvement in the Battle of Fredericksburg. At the Battle of Chancellorsville on May 1–5, 1863, Slocum commanded the Union right wing, including the XII Corps and the V Corps of Maj. Gen. George G. Meade and the XI Corps of Maj. Gen. Oliver O. Howard, a combined force of 46,000 men. Slocum executed well and maneuvered his wing into the rear of Gen. Robert E. Lee's army, halting the Confederate advance.

When Joe Hooker was removed from command of the army on June 28, Slocum, as the ranking corps commander, would normally be in line to succeed him, but the War Department instead appointed George Meade as army commander, apparently feeling that he was a more aggressive fighter. Slocum graciously consented to serving under Meade, his junior in rank.

=== Gettysburg ===
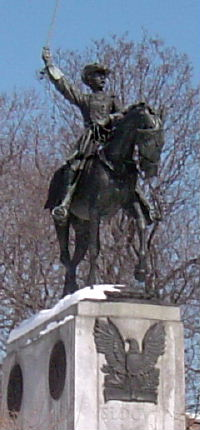
An equestrian statue of Slocum by Frederick William MacMonnies in Brooklyn's Prospect Park

Maj. Gen. Slocum played a decisive role in the Union victory at the Battle of Gettysburg, July 1–3, 1863. His XII Corps troops' defense of Culp's Hill on the Union right is credited with ensuring Meade's ultimate victory against Lee's army.

Despite this, some modern historians of Gettysburg have questioned the actions of Slocum on the afternoon of July 1, 1863. They allege that he failed to come to the immediate aid of General Howard's XI Corps and engage Confederate troops in a timely way at Gettysburg. Information from recently accessed records, however, including Gen. Meade's archives, shows that Slocum, in fact, dispatched the First Division of his Corps to Gettysburg immediately upon hearing the first report of the fighting. Further, Gen. Slocum's First Division commander, Brig. Gen. Alpheus S. Williams, verified this as he reported in late 1865 that "when reports of the battle going on in advance of Gettysburg were brought to Gen. Slocum ... orders were issued to put the corps in motion," and the "corps was immediately put in rapid march toward the scene."

A report by Maj. Guindon, whom Slocum had sent on a reconnaissance mission, corroborates Williams' report; Maj. Guindon indicated that Slocum moved out troops even before he received a request for aid from Gen. Howard. Furthermore, Slocum advanced his First Division despite an order (known as the "Pipe Creek Circular") issued by General Meade that morning, and received by Slocum at 1:30 pm, to "halt your command where this order reaches you." Contrary to modern interpretation, Slocum's actions in fact showed initiative.

Slocum arrived at the battlefield marching from Two Taverns on the Baltimore Pike, about 5 miles southeast of the battlefield, late in the afternoon on July 1, 1863.

As the ranking general on the field, Slocum commanded the Union army for about six hours, until Meade arrived after midnight. During this time, Slocum was responsible for the supervision of the formation of the Union defensive lines. For the duration of the battle, Slocum would command the Union line from the "point of the fish hook" from Culp's Hill to the south. Slocum's XII Corps would successfully defend Culp's Hill for three days, denying a Confederate victory at this most crucial of battles. During the battle of Culp's Hill, in addition to his own XII Corps, Slocum commanded elements of the I, VI and XI Corps.

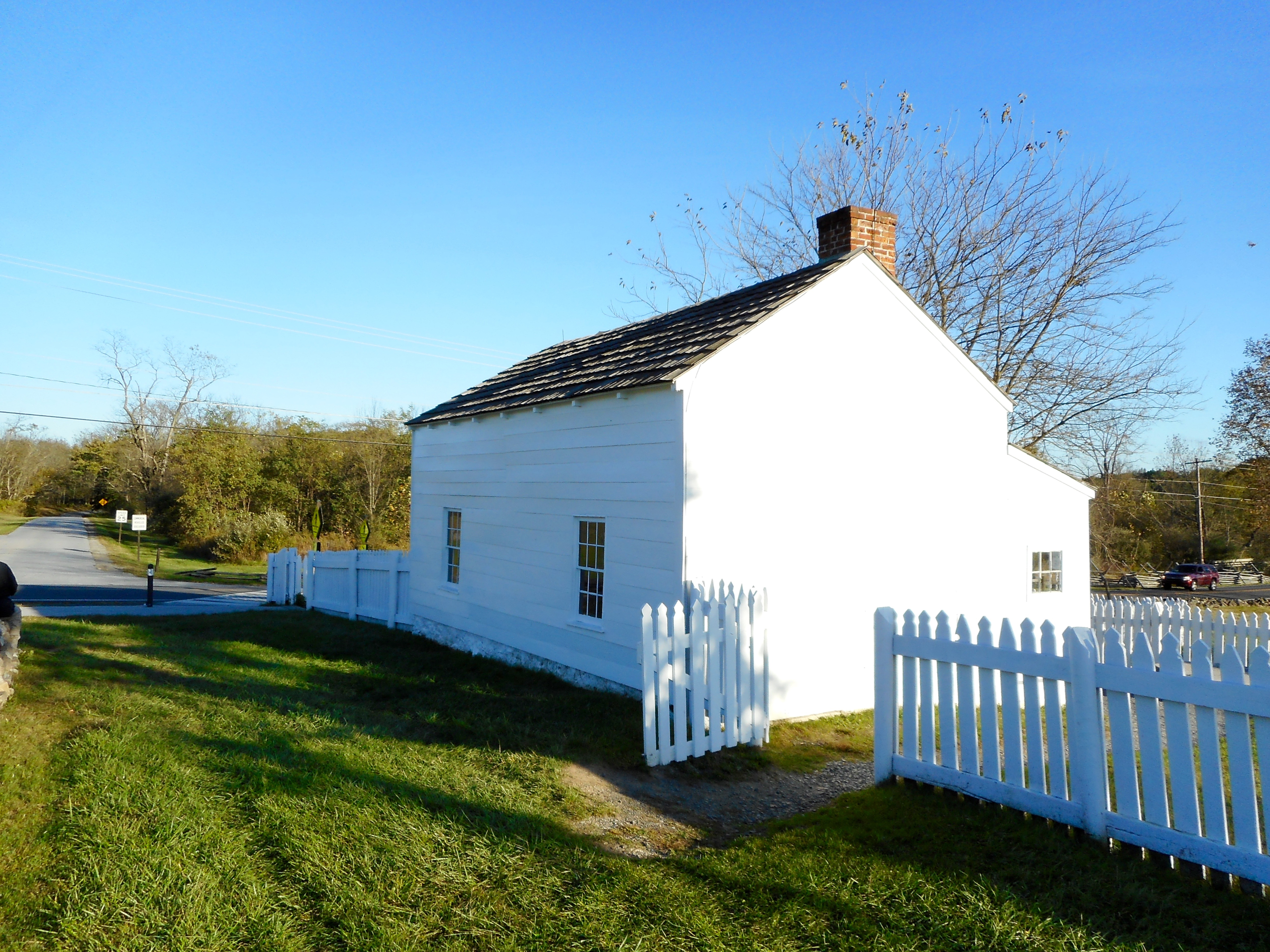
Leister house in Gettysburg

On July 2 at midnight, Gen. Meade called for a council of war with his corps commanders. It was held at his field headquarters in the front room of the Leister house. He asked his commanders whether the Union Army should remain in its present position, or to retire to another position nearer its base of supplies. Further, if the Army remained in its present position, should it attack or await the attack of the enemy. It is then that Slocum gave his recommendation to "Stay and fight it out."

Meade planned an attack from the Power's Hill area into the Confederate left flank, to be led by Slocum the following day, utilizing the V Corps and the XII Corps as the army's "right wing." Slocum reported to Meade that he believed the plan was not feasible, as the terrain was too difficult for an assault. General Gouvernor K. Warren agreed with Slocum's assessment.

When Meade ordered Slocum to send the entire XII Corps to assist the defense against Lt. Gen. James Longstreet's assault on the Union left flank on July 2, Slocum wisely recommended holding one brigade back in its position on Culp's Hill. This brigade, under Brig. Gen. George S. Greene, was able to hold out against a massive Confederate assault and saved the critical hill for the Union. This brigade was composed of five regiments of infantry, of only 1,350 soldiers. The regiments were: the 60th New York, Colonel Abel Godard; the 78th New York, Colonel Herbert von Hammerstein; the 102nd New York, Colonel Lewis R. Stegman; the 137th New York, Colonel David Ireland; and the 149th New York, Colonel Henry A. Barnum.

General Greene later wrote in an article for Century Magazine, "To the discernment of General Slocum who saw the danger to which the army would exposed by the movement ordered by Meade to deplete the right wing the afternoon of July 2, and who took the responsibility of modifying the orders which he had received from Meade is due the honor of having saved the army from a great and perhaps fatal disaster."

General Oliver O. Howard later recalled of Slocum's troops and the defense of Culp's Hill: "The fighting at Culp's Hill was the most impressive incident of the Battle of Gettysburg ... a step all-important and essential to victory ... Slocum ... prevented Meade from losing the Battle of Gettysburg." Slocum's XII Corps received no medals of honor for the defense of Culp's Hill and the Union right wing."

=== Western Theater ===
During the autumn of 1863, Slocum was transferred with his corps to the Western Theater. When he learned that he would have to serve under Joe Hooker, Slocum, who had disliked Hooker since Chancellorsville, wrote to President Lincoln saying that he would rather resign from the Army. Lincoln assured him that he would not actually have to serve under Hooker and a compromise was reached whereby one division of the corps, under Slocum, was assigned to protect the Nashville and Chattanooga Railroad while the other division served directly under Hooker.

During the summer of 1864, Slocum commanded the District of Vicksburg and the XVII Corps of the Department of the Tennessee. Slocum's administration of the district of Vicksburg was so efficient and successful that attempts to transfer Slocum to a fighting command in Georgia were prevented by Union Army commander General Ulysses S. Grant.

When Maj. Gen. James B. McPherson was killed in action during the Atlanta campaign, command of Army of the Tennessee opened up, and when Hooker did not get it he resigned his commission. Maj. Gen. William T. Sherman appointed Slocum to command the XX Corps, which earlier had been formed by merging the XI Corps and XII Corps into a single command. His former XII Corps soldiers cheered their previous commander's return. When Atlanta fell to Sherman on September 2, 1864, Gen. Slocum and his corps were the first to enter the city.

Slocum was occupation commander of Atlanta for ten weeks, during which time he tried to make the occupation as tolerable for civilians as he could. Slocum wrote to his wife in a letter on November 7, 1864: "I wish for humanity's sake that this sad war could be brought to a close. While laboring to make it successful, I shall do all in my power to mitigate its horrors."

At the start of the Franklin-Nashville Campaign, Sherman left Slocum in command of 12,000 troops in Atlanta as Sherman pursued Confederate Lt. Gen. John Bell Hood and his army.

=== March to the Sea: Savannah Campaign ===
One of General Slocum's most important commands was that of the Army of Georgia, which participated in the famous March to the Sea. Slocum and his Army of Georgia participated in all engagements from the beginning of the March on November 16 until the surrender of the Confederate forces of General Joseph E. Johnston.

General William Tecumseh Sherman's March to the Sea, also called the Savannah Campaign, was among the most effective campaigns of the Civil War. The plan was conceived by Sherman himself, and approved by General Ulysses S. Grant and President Abraham Lincoln.

Sherman's objective was to divide the Confederacy in two along a West to East path following its strategic rail lines. Sherman's Army would exchange its inland base of Atlanta for the more secure base (Savannah) on the Atlantic coast, which was controlled by the Union Navy. Another objective was to disrupt the Southern economy by limiting access to vast food stores, manufacturing and destroying their rail and communication systems. Furthermore, it would demonstrate that the Southern Army could not defend their heartland. The campaign would prevent reinforcing of Lee's troops defending Petersburg, Virginia, and the Confederate capital of Richmond. Sherman's Savannah campaign was considered a major Union success. Historians have stated that this was a major contribution to the overall Union victory in the war. The March was considered revolutionary, and in some ways unique, in the annals of modern warfare.

Sherman's Army was composed of two armies, called wings, and a cavalry division. During the March, they followed separate paths along four parallel routes, 20–60 miles apart. Columns of men could stretch up to 50 miles long. Wagon columns could stretch up to 30 miles. The right wing (southern column; Army of the Tennessee) marched along the Georgia railroad, the Macon and Western railroad. The left wing (northern column; Army of Georgia) marched following the Georgia railroad, feinting toward Augusta. Sherman's plan was to confuse the Confederate Army as to his objectives. The city he was heading for was Milledgeville, the Georgia state capital, which was captured on November 22, 1864. The ultimate objective of the March was the port city of Savannah, which was captured and occupied on December 21, 1864.

Sherman later placed Slocum in command of the newly created Army of Georgia, composed of the XIV Corps and the XX Corps from the Army of the Cumberland, which served as the left wing in Sherman's March to the Sea. The total number of officers and men in Slocum's Army of Georgia was 26,703. The XIV Corps, commanded by Brig. Gen. Jefferson C. Davis, had 13,962 officers and men. The XX Corps, commanded by Brig. Gen. Alpheus S. Williams, had 13,714 officers and men. The other wing, consisting of the XV and XVII Corps of the Army of the Tennessee, was commanded by Gen. Oliver O. Howard.

Sherman's Army travelled light. Individual soldiers carried only minimal amounts of supplies, ammunition, rations. The Army, cut off from its supply base, partially lived off captured supplies. Sherman brought sufficient rations for the initial campaigns. He wrote, "I had wagons enough loaded with essentials, and beef cattle enough to feed on for more than a month, and had the census statistics showing the produce of every county through which I desired to pass. No military expedition was ever based on sounder or surer data."

Each brigade had 50 enlisted men and one officer foraging team for supplying food.

Approximately 3,000 infantrymen were engaged in foraging on any given day of the March. That represents 5% of all infantrymen on the March.

The Savannah campaign was launched on November 15 and concluded with the capture and occupation of Savannah on December 21, 1864 (36 days). There were 25 days of actual marching. Slocum's army traversed approximately 300 miles (480 km). Slocum's Army of Georgia moved, on average, 12 to 15 miles per day and passed through 31 counties in Georgia. The Union column traversed 15 major creeks, streams and rivers that required pontoon bridges. During the march, Slocum's troops employed individuals who were newly freed from slavery as pontoon builders and road-building detachments. The average distance of each crossing was 230 feet. Between Sherman's two armies, pioneers were required to build over 100 miles of corduroy roads. Weather was relatively clear, as it only rained on two days.

For Slocum's Army of Georgia, there were no major battles fought during the Savannah campaign. Most of the actions were, by Union accounts, skirmishes or small actions.

General Sherman's Army captured two major cities during the March to the Sea. These cities were Milledgeville, the Capitol of Georgia, and Savannah, Georgia, the principal seaport city of Georgia. Both cities were occupied by the Union Army and there was little destruction of property caused by soldiers. Both cities remained intact. The Union Army, in both cases, was credited with protecting these cities. In Savannah, the mayor of the city and aldermen thanked General Sherman and Slocum's subordinate, General Geary.

Upon reaching Savannah, Slocum took the surrender of the city on December 21, 1864. Slocum then set up fire guards and prevented the city of Savannah from being damaged. On December 22, Sherman telegraphed Abraham Lincoln, presenting Savannah as a Christmas present to Lincoln and the Union.

After the capture of the city, Slocum recommended to Sherman that Confederate Gen. William J. Hardee's corps, whose only escape route was north over a causeway, be cut off. But Sherman rejected Slocum's plan, and Hardee escaped, to fight again at Bentonville.

=== Carolinas Campaign ===
The Carolinas Campaign was launched leaving Savannah in late January 1865. Slocum's troops marched a total of 425 miles (684 km) in 50 days. The march had been far more demanding than the March to the Sea, as the terrain was more difficult and there was much more rain. The Confederate forces opposing Sherman's army were even smaller than during the Savannah campaign.

In mid-April, Confederate Gen. Johnston met with Confederate President Jefferson Davis in Greensboro, North Carolina. He confessed:

Our people are tired of the war, feel themselves whipped, and will not fight. Our country is overrun, its military resources greatly diminished, while the enemy's military power and resources were never greater and may be increased to any extent desired. ... My small force is melting away like snow before the sun.

During the Carolinas campaign, Slocum's army was heavily engaged at the Battle of Averasborough, on March 15–16, 1865, and the Battle of Bentonville, on March 19, 1865, where Slocum successfully held off a surprise assault by Gen. Joseph E. Johnston. After Slocum's defeat of the Confederate forces at Bentonville, an officer of Sherman's staff wrote: "Slocum was more than equal to the necessity of the hour, and his success justified General Sherman's selection of him as commander of the Left Wing of the Army."

Gen. Joseph E. Johnston surrendered to Gen. Sherman and his army on April 17, 1865, at Bennett's farm, Durham Station, North Carolina.

Most of the damage inflicted by Sherman's army was in destruction of railroads, factories, cotton supplies and manufacturing, livestock, confiscation of food stores. Sherman imposed strict rules regarding both foraging and destruction of property. The principal loss to the Confederacy was the freeing of individuals from slavery. Estimated Confederate losses: 100 million dollars (1.4 billion in 2010 dollars) – Estimated (General Sherman estimated this damage, but it was not based on any actual tallying of figures); 20 million dollars – General Sherman estimated that this amount was confiscated by the Union Army during the March. The left wing of Sherman's march destroyed 125 miles of railroad track.

As a direct result of Sherman's March through the South, thousands of slaves left their plantations and workplaces and joined Sherman's army as refugees. It is estimated that between 17,000 and 25,000 newly freed enslaved people followed Sherman's army during the march through Georgia. It is estimated that 8,000 of these newly freed individuals followed the army into Savannah. In addition, it is estimated that 7,587 individuals were freed from slavery in Savannah and its surrounding areas on December 21, 1864. Wherever Sherman's March went throughout Georgia and the Carolina's, he was enforcing the provisions of the Emancipation Proclamation.

Both Army commanders under General Sherman were abolitionists who opposed slavery. General Oliver O. Howard of the Army of the Tennessee and General Henry W. Slocum were active in the anti-slavery movement. Several other general officers were abolitionists.

Hundreds of men liberated from slavery served in the columns as teamsters, cooks, and cleared and built roads, etc. They helped in convoys, as wagoneers and teamsters, and helped in various camp duties. They provided service as guides and scouts, provided military intelligence about the position of the Confederate Army. Individuals liberated from slavery also informed Union commanders about where provisions could be found. Union officers praised these highly valued individuals.

Formerly enslaved men also aided escaped Union soldiers.

A Union officer wrote: "What they have done for the Army entitles them to their freedom or whatever they may desire."

Many of the Union soldiers saw the evils of slavery for the first time. Many of them commented in their letters home that it had changed their ideas about why the war was being fought.

=== End of the War ===
After Confederate General Joseph E. Johnston's surrender at Durham Station, North Carolina, General Slocum and the Army of Georgia made their way north to Washington, DC. The XIV and XX Corps participated in the Grand Army Review in Washington, DC, on Wednesday, May 24, 1865.

Slocum commanded the Department of the Mississippi from April through September 1865. In this role, his "General Orders No. 22" appear as attachment number 12 in Carl Schurz's 1865 Report to Congress on the Condition of the South. The orders countermanded the attempt by the provisional governor of Mississippi, William Sharkey, to form a state militia independent of federal control. The militia was created to prevent newly freed slaves from exercising their rights as citizens. Section VII of his "General Orders No. 10" also appear in this report in attachment number 27. Here he makes it clear that, as long as courts grant equal privileges, ex-slaves are to be regulated by the same criminal statutes as other citizens.

With the end of the war, Slocum resigned his commission in the volunteers on September 28, 1865, rather than accept an appointment in the Regular Army at a reduced rank, and returned to Syracuse, New York. A year later, the army gave him an offer to come back into service as commander of the 31st US Infantry, but he turned it down.

== Postbellum life ==
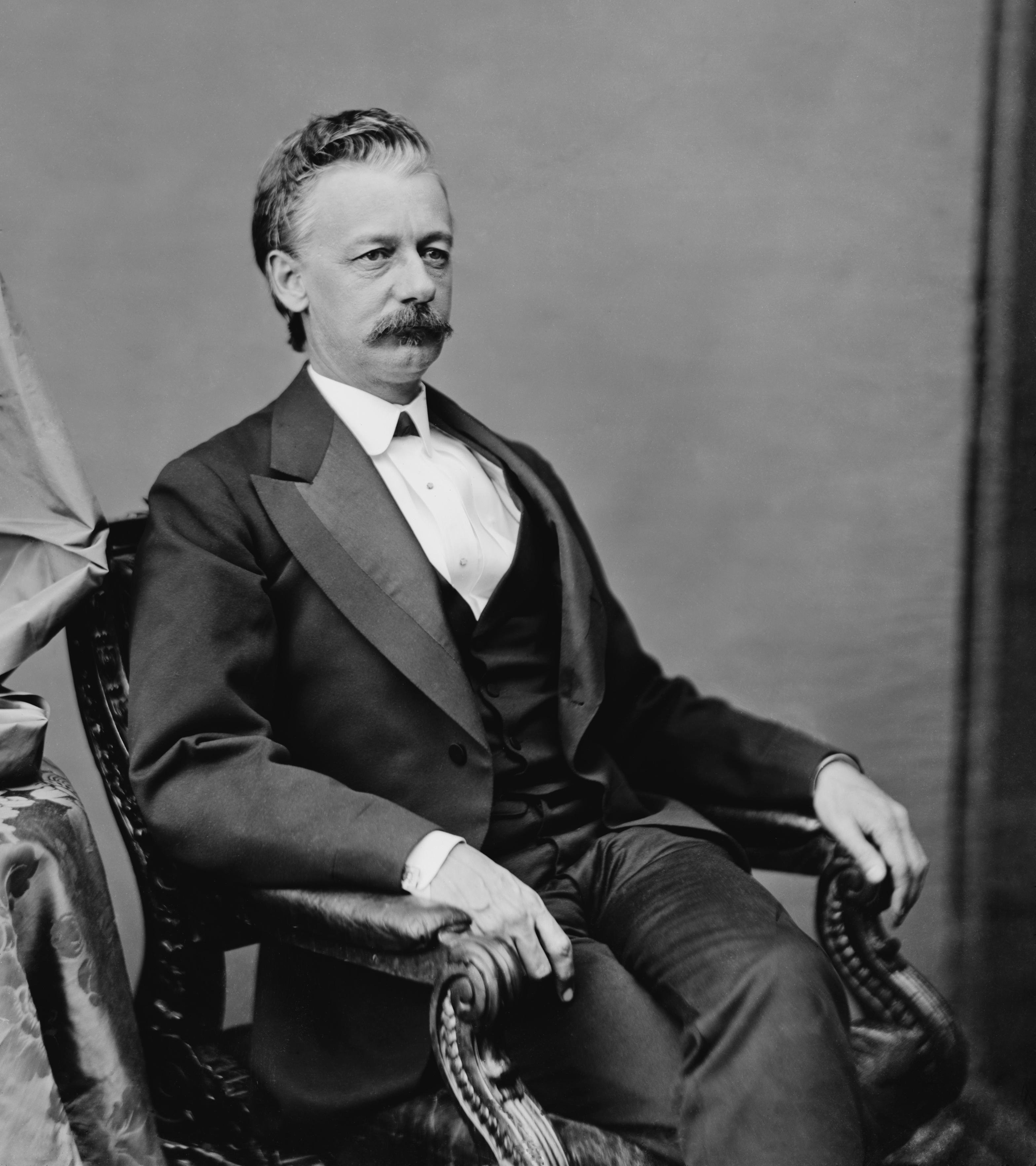
Henry Warner Slocum

Slocum ran as the Democratic candidate for Secretary of State of New York in 1865, but was defeated by fellow Gettysburg General Francis C. Barlow. Slocum and his wife, Clara, and family moved to Brooklyn, New York, in 1866. They resided at 465 Clinton Avenue. After resuming work as a lawyer, he declined an offer to return to the U.S. Army as a colonel. In 1868, Slocum was president of New York's electoral college. On January 6, 1869, he was elected as a companion of the New York Commandery of the Military Order of the Loyal Legion of the United States.

=== Congress ===
Slocum was elected as a Democrat to the 41st and 42nd Congresses (March 4, 1869 – March 3, 1873). He was not a candidate for renomination in 1872. Instead, he resumed the practice of law. In 1882, he was elected Representative at large from New York to the 48th Congress (March 3, 1883 – March 4, 1885). Slocum took an active interest in military and veterans' affairs. He worked in Congress for the exoneration of Major General Fitz John Porter who was court-martialed after the Second Battle of Bull Run. Slocum gave a strong speech on Porter's behalf in Congress on January 18, 1884.

In 1882, Slocum narrowly missed being nominated to be the Democratic candidate for governor of New York. In the first two ballots, Slocum was tied with candidate Roswell P. Flower, a Wall Street lawyer. To break the tie, the convention selected future President Grover Cleveland on the third ballot. In 1885, Slocum was Grand Marshal of President Grover Cleveland's first inaugural parade in Washington, D.C.

=== Later career ===
Slocum was a major investor in a number of companies and became director of the People's Trust Company, the Williamsburg City Fire Insurance Company, and other successful ventures. Slocum was also a trustee of the Park Savings Bank of Brooklyn, New York, which failed in the depression of 1876.

In 1875, Slocum launched a campaign for civil service reform in the city of Brooklyn. He advocated for the hiring of qualified representatives rather than political appointments.

Slocum was appointed Commissioner of the department of city works of Brooklyn, New York in 1876 and was involved in many civic improvements, from surface transportation to the Brooklyn Bridge.

Slocum was an early advocate for the building of the Brooklyn Bridge, which would link Brooklyn to Manhattan. Slocum went on a study mission to view other bridges built by proposed Brooklyn Bridge designer John Roebling. He was an early investor in the Brooklyn Bridge and was appointed to the Board of Directors. He advocated unsuccessfully for having no bridge tolls. Slocum's name is prominent on a bronze tablet that is located on one of the bridge's towers.

Slocum was also active in the building of streetcar systems in Brooklyn. He founded and was president of the Brooklyn Crosstown Railroad, which started service in 1872 and became one of the most profitable streetcar lines in the city. In addition, he was a large stockholder in other rail lines and was president of the Brooklyn and Coney Island Railroad Company. He was an early advocate of converting the horse-drawn rail cars to electricity.

In 1877, Slocum was elected president of the Society of the Army of the Potomac, at a reunion in Providence, Rhode Island.

In 1880, Slocum traveled with his family to Europe. In addition to serving again in the Congress (beginning in 1883), Slocum remained active in Civil War veterans' affairs. He was president of the Board of Trustees of the New York State Soldiers' and Sailors' Home in Bath, New York, serving until 1887, and was a member of the New York Monuments Commission for the battlefield of Gettysburg. He served on this commission until his death.

=== Relationship with Sherman ===
Slocum remained friends with Gen. William Tecumseh Sherman until Sherman's death in 1891. Both Gen. Oliver Howard and Gen. Slocum planned Sherman's funeral and were honorary pall bearers.

=== Retirement ===
Slocum never wrote his memoirs, as had other prominent Union generals. He, however wrote a number of articles about his wartime service for popular magazines, such as Century Magazine. These articles were later reprinted in Battles and Leaders of the Civil War in 1887.

=== Death ===
Slocum died of liver disease in Brooklyn, New York, on April 14, 1894. He was interred at Green-Wood Cemetery, where Gen. Fitz-John Porter also is interred.

A former member of his staff wrote of him, in memoriam: "In all the sterling qualities that go to make up a man, I have seldom met the equal or superior of Major General Henry W. Slocum. Firm and resolute of purpose, yet with so much modesty, so little of self-assertion; so faithful in the performance of whatever he believed to be his duty; so independent in his speech and conduct, whatever might be the future result."

== Namesakes ==
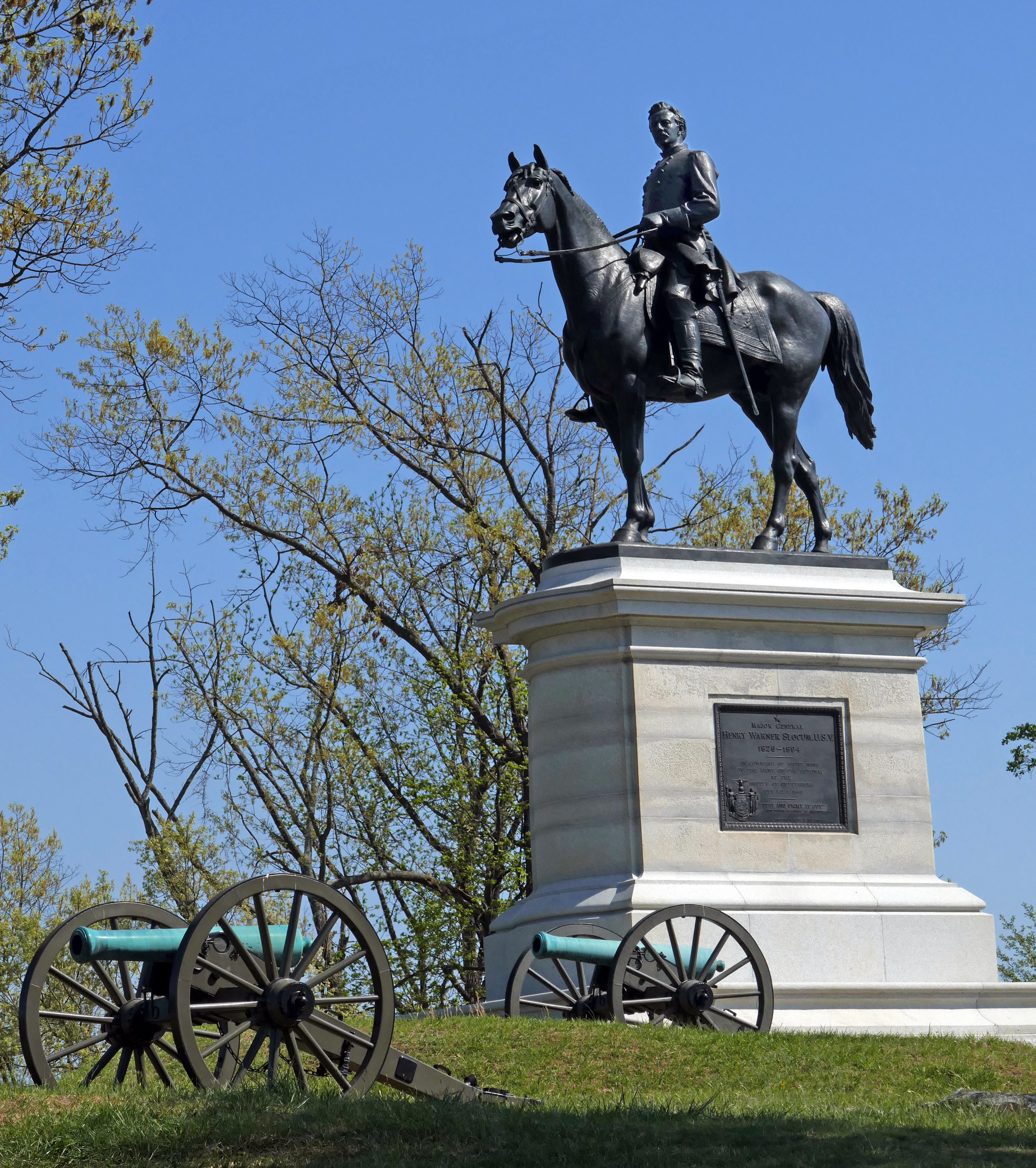
Monument of Maj. Gen. Henry W. Slocum in Gettysburg, Pennsylvania

Equestrian statues of Slocum are located at Steven's Knoll and Culp's Hill, Gettysburg battlefield (dedicated on September 19, 1902), and in Grand Army Plaza, Brooklyn, New York (dedicated on Memorial Day, May 30, 1905).

A steamship, the General Slocum, was named for him; it had a disastrous fire on board in 1904 with much loss of life.

Fort Slocum, New York, guarded the entrance to New York Harbor from Long Island Sound from 1867 to 1965 when it was deactivated by the US Army. It was officially named Fort Slocum in 1896.

A United States Army transport ship used for carrying soldiers and equipment during the Spanish–American War was named for General Slocum. It transported troops from San Francisco to the Philippines beginning in 1898.

== See also ==
- List of American Civil War generals (Union)

== Archives ==
- Samuel P. Bates Collection, Pennsylvania Historical and Museum Commission.
- John B. Bachelder Papers, New Hampshire Historical Society.
- Colonel Joseph Howland papers, New York Historical Society, letters 1862–1866.
- Slocum, Henry W. "U.S. Army Generals' Report of Civil War Service, 1846–1887." National Archives and Records Administration, College Park, MD.

Military offices
Preceded by Alpheus S. Williams	Commander of the XII Corps (Army of the Potomac); October 20, 1862 – July 1, 1863	Succeeded by Alpheus S. Williams
Preceded by Alpheus S. Williams	Commander of the XII Corps (Army of the Potomac); July 4, 1863 – August 1, 1863	Succeeded by Alpheus S. Williams
Preceded by Alpheus S. Williams	Commander of the XII Corps (Army of the Potomac); September 13, 1863 – September 25, 1863	Succeeded by command transferred to Army of the Cumberland
Preceded by Himself as commander of XII Corps within the Army of the Potomac	Commander of the XII Corps, Army of the Cumberland; September 25, 1863 – April 18, 1864	Succeeded by command absorbed by XX Corps
U.S. House of Representatives
Preceded by William E. Robinson	Member of the U.S. House of Representatives from New York's 3rd congressional district 1869–1873	Succeeded by Stewart L. Woodford
Preceded by Lyman Tremain	Member of the U.S. House of Representatives from New York's at-large congressional seat 1883–1885	Succeeded by John Fitzgibbons; Elmer E. Studley
