= 1932 New York state election =

- November 8, 1932

The 1932 New York state election was held on November 8, 1932, to elect the governor, the lieutenant governor, the state comptroller, the attorney general, the chief judge, a U.S. senator and two U.S. representatives-at-large, as well as all members of the New York State Assembly and the New York State Senate. Incumbent Governor Franklin D. Roosevelt did not seek reelection, and instead successfully ran for President.

== History ==
By a reapportionment in 1932, the state of New York received two more seats in the U.S. House of Representatives, but instead of redistricting the congressional districts, the additional congressmen were elected at-large on the state ticket until the election of 1944.

The Socialist Labor state convention met on April 29, a day before the party's national convention, in New York City, and nominated Aaron M. Orange for governor; and Emil F. Teichert for lieutenant governor.

The Communist state convention met on June 19 at Schenectady, New York, and nominated Israel Amter for governor; and Henry Shepard, a "Harlem Negro", for Lieutenant Governor

The Socialist state convention met on July 3 at Utica, New York, and nominated Louis Waldman for the third time to run for governor; and Frank R. Crosswaith for lieutenant governor. Crosswaith however declined, instead running for Congress in Harlem, and Charles W. Noonan was substituted on the ticket.

The Law Preservation state convention met on October 3 at Syracuse, New York and nominated the Rev. Dr. John F. Vichert, of Rochester, a professor of practical theology at Colgate Divinity School, for governor; H. Westlake Coons for lieutenant governor; Ralph H. Culley, of Rochester, for attorney general; Francis A. Walters, of Rome, for comptroller; and Dr. D. Leigh Colvin for U.S. Senator. At first Vichert declined, but a few days later changed his mind.

The Republican state convention met on October 4 at Buffalo, New York, and nominated Colonel William J. "Wild Bill" Donovan for governor; and Assistant U.S. Secretary of War F. Trubee Davison for lieutenant governor; Mayor of Rochester, New York Charles S. Owen for comptroller; Moses G. Hubbard, of Utica, for attorney general; George Z. Medalie for the U.S. Senate; and the incumbent Chief Judge Cuthbert W. Pound to succeed himself.

The Democratic state convention met on October 4 at Albany, New York, and nominated Lieutenant Governor Herbert H. Lehman for governor to succeed Governor Franklin D. Roosevelt who had been nominated for U.S. President; M. William Bray for lieutenant governor; and re-nominated the other incumbent state officers, among them the Republican Chief Judge Cuthbert W. Pound.

== Result ==
The whole Democratic ticket was elected in another landslide. The incumbents Tremaine, Bennett, Pound, and Wagner were re-elected. The incumbent Governor Roosevelt was elected President of the United States, defeating incumbent President Herbert Hoover.

1932 state election results
Office	Democratic ticket		Republican ticket		Socialist ticket		Law Preservation ticket		Communist ticket		Socialist Labor ticket	
Governor	Herbert H. Lehman	2,659,519	William J. Donovan	1,812,080	Louis Waldman	102,959	John F. Vichert	83,452	Israel Amter	26,407	Aaron M. Orange	7,233
Lieutenant Governor	M. William Bray	2,469,371	F. Trubee Davison	1,806,941	Charles W. Noonan	141,401	H. Westlake Coons	71,862	Henry Shepard	29,080	Emil F. Teichert	9,913
Comptroller	Morris S. Tremaine	2,468,228	Charles S. Owen	1,771,104	Elizabeth C. Roth	153,299	Francis A. Watters	68,947	Rose Wortis	29,558	John E. DeLee	10,394
Attorney General	John J. Bennett Jr.	2,472,739	Moses G. Hubbard	1,764,549	William Karlin	155,174	Ralph H. Culley	68,030	J. Louis Engdahl	29,737	Simeon Bickwheat	10,224
Chief Judge	Cuthbert W. Pound		Cuthbert W. Pound	4,183,939	Jacob Panken	193,409			George E. Powers	31,076		
U.S. Senator	Robert F. Wagner	2,532,905	George Z. Medalie	1,751,186	Charles Solomon	143,282	D. Leigh Colvin	74,611	William Weinstone	29,052	Jeremiah D. Crowley	10,328
U.S. Representative-at-large	Elmer E. Studley	2,363,627	Nicholas H. Pinto	1,756,343	G. August Gerber	166,781	Elizabeth A. Smart	74,436			Jacob Berlin	12,546
U.S. Representative-at-large	John Fitzgibbons	2,333,787	Sherman J. Lowell	1,740,325	Fred Sander	163,648	J. Elmer Cates	68,622			O. Martin Olson	11,623

== See also ==
- New York gubernatorial elections
- New York state elections
- 1932 United States presidential election
- 1932 New York City special mayoral election

== Sources ==
- Result: ROOSEVELT'S LEAD IN STATE 596,996 in NYT on December 10, 1932
- Result (Prohibition only): Vote for Prohibition candidates at Prohibitionists.org

Results-New York Red Book 1933
