= Matthew J. Merritt =

American politician

Matthew Merritt
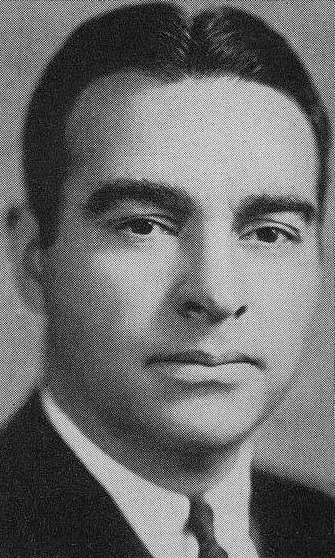

Member of the U.S. House of Representatives from New York's at-large district
- In office January 3, 1935 – January 3, 1945
- Preceded by: John Fitzgibbons
- Succeeded by: At-large seat discontinued

Personal details
- Born: Matthew Joseph Merritt; April 2, 1895 New York City, U.S.
- Died: September 29, 1946 (aged 51)
- Resting place: Mount St. Mary's Cemetery in Whitestone, New York
- Party: Democratic

Matthew Joseph Merritt (April 2, 1895 New York City – September 29, 1946 Malba, Queens, NYC) was an American businessman, World War I veteran, and politician from New York. From 1935 to 1945, he served five terms in the U.S. House of Representatives.

== Life ==
=== World War I ===
He attended the schools of New York City, and enlisted in the United States Army for World War I. as a sergeant in Company C, 327th Tank Battalion, a unit of the newly organized Tank Corps. After the war Merritt engaged in the real estate and insurance businesses in New York City from 1926 to 1933, and served with the New York loan agency of the Reconstruction Finance Corporation in 1933 and 1934.

=== Political career ===
In 1934, 1936, 1938, 1940 and 1942, Merritt was elected at-large as a Democrat to the 74th, 75th, 76th, 77th and 78th United States Congresses, holding office from January 3, 1935, to January 3, 1945.

=== Later career and death ===
Afterwards he resumed his work in real estate and insurance.

He died on September 29, 1946, and was buried at the Mount St. Mary's Cemetery in Whitestone, New York.

U.S. House of Representatives
Preceded by Elmer E. Studley; John Fitzgibbons	Member of the U.S. House of Representatives from New York's at-large congressional seat 1935–1945 alongside Caroline O'Day and Winifred C. Stanley	Seat abolished
