= Army of Georgia =

- Country: United States of America
- Branch: United States Army
- Type: Field Army
- Engagements: American Civil War

Commanders
- Notable commanders: Henry Warner Slocum

The Army of Georgia was a Union army that constituted the Left Wing of Major General William T. Sherman's Army Group during the March to the Sea and the Carolinas campaign. Although the Army of Georgia name was soon applied to this force, it was not officially recognized until March 28, 1865.

== History ==
During Sherman's Atlanta campaign in 1864, his Army Group was composed of the Army of the Tennessee, the Army of the Cumberland, and the Army of the Ohio. After the fall of Atlanta in September, Sherman sent the Army of the Ohio and the IV Corps of the Army of the Cumberland north to deal with the remnants of Lt. Gen. John Bell Hood's Army of Tennessee. Then, on November 7, 1864, he created the army soon called Army of Georgia by combining the remaining XIV Corps and the XX Corps of the Army of the Cumberland. This new army, placed under the command of Maj. Gen. Henry Warner Slocum of the XX Corps, served as one of the two wings in Sherman's March to the Sea. The Army of the Tennessee, consisting of the XV and XVII Corps, commanded by Oliver O. Howard, served as the other wing. The Army of Georgia was involved in little fighting during the March to the Sea but was engaged in the Battle of Averasborough and bore the brunt of fighting at the Battle of Bentonville.

== Commander ==
- Major General Henry Warner Slocum (November 7, 1864 – June 17, 1865).

== Major battles and campaigns ==
- Atlanta campaign
- Sherman's March to the Sea
- Carolinas campaign
- Battle of Averasborough
- Battle of Bentonville
- Grand Review of the Armies
