= Grand Review of the Armies =

Military procession in Washington DC after the end of the American Civil War

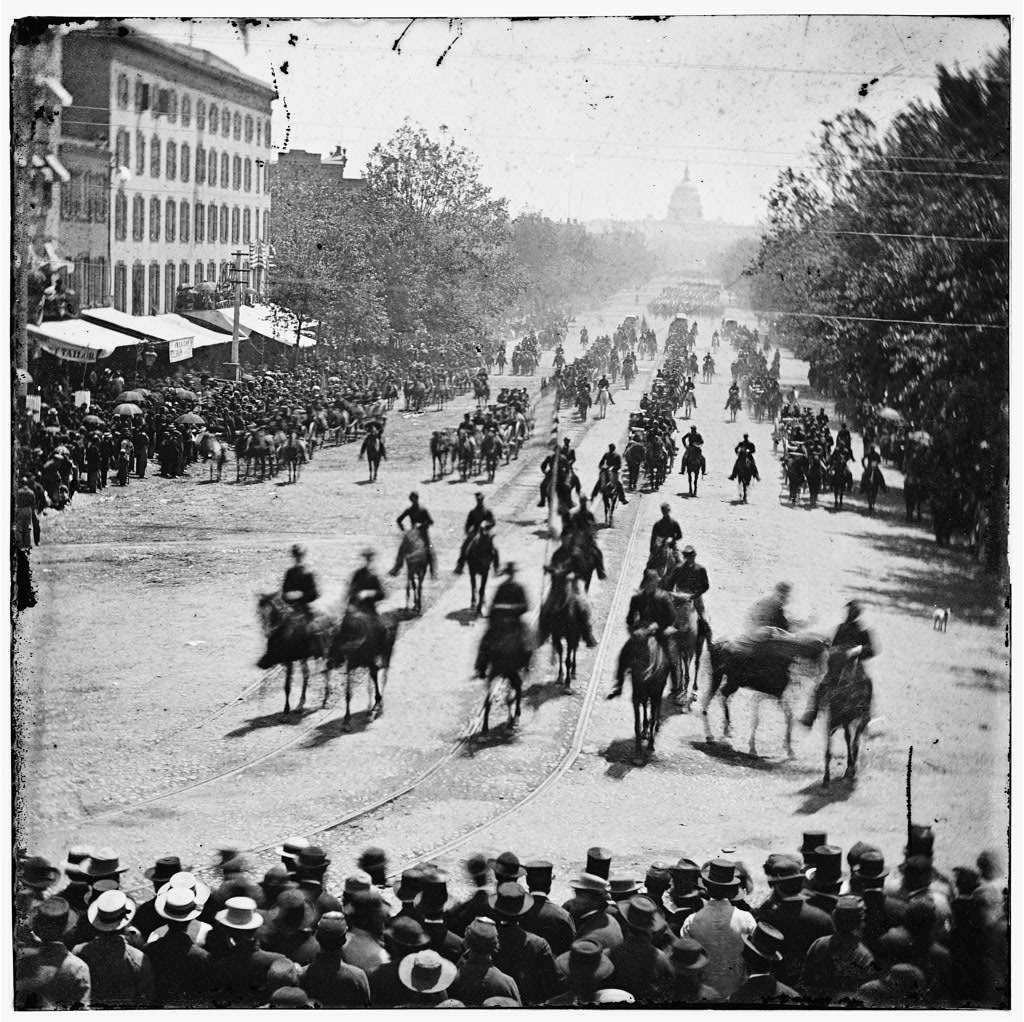
- Grand Review of the Armies on Pennsylvania Avenue, in the national capital city of Washington, D.C., heading northwest from the United States Capitol (dome visible in rear) towards the White House (Executive Mansion) at 15th Street, N.W., by the United States Treasury Department building, at the conclusion of the American Civil War (1861–1865), May 23–24, 1865.
- Date: May 23–24, 1865
- Location: Pennsylvania Avenue, Northwest, Washington, D.C.
- Participants: Ulysses S. Grant, Commanding General, Union Army / United States Army; George Gordon Meade; Army of the Potomac; William T. Sherman; Army of the West

The Grand Review of the Armies was a military procession and celebration in the national capital city of Washington, D.C., on May 23–24, 1865, following the Union victory in the American Civil War (1861–1865). Elements of the Union army in the United States Army paraded through the streets of the capital to receive accolades from the crowds and reviewing politicians, officials, and prominent citizens, including United States president Andrew Johnson, a month after the assassination of Abraham Lincoln.

== History ==
On May 10, United States president Andrew Johnson declared that the rebellion and armed resistance was virtually at an end, and had made plans with government authorities for a formal review to honor the troops. One of his side goals was to change the mood of the capital, which was still in mourning following the assassination of Abraham Lincoln a month before at Ford's Theater. Three of the leading Federal armies were close enough to participate in the procession. The Army of the Tennessee arrived via train. The Army of Georgia, also under the command of William T. Sherman, had just completed its Carolinas campaign and had accepted the surrender of the largest remaining Confederate army, that of Joseph E. Johnston. It arrived from North Carolina in mid-May and camped around the capital city in various locations, across the Potomac River from the Army of the Potomac, fresh off its victories over Robert E. Lee in Virginia. It had arrived in Washington, D.C., on May 12. Officers in the three armies who had not seen each other for some time (in some cases since before the war) communed and renewed acquaintances, while at times, the common infantrymen engaged in verbal sparring (and sometimes fisticuffs) in the town's taverns and bars over which army was superior. Sherman, concerned that his Westerners would not present as polished an image as the eastern army, drilled his forces and insisted that uniforms be cleaned, buttons and brass shined, and that bayonets glistened.

Beyond boosting domestic morale, the Grand Review served as a demonstration of federal military strength. The display of over 140,000 veterans in the capital was intended to project national unity and signal the federal government's capacity to enforce its authority during the early stages of the Reconstruction era.

At 9:00 a.m. on a bright sunny May 23, a signal gun fired a single shot and Major General George Gordon Meade, the victor of Gettysburg, led the estimated 80,000 men of Army of the Potomac down the streets of Washington from Capitol Hill down Pennsylvania Avenue past crowds that numbered into the thousands. The infantry marched with 12 men across the road, followed by the divisional and corps artillery, then an array of cavalry regiments that stretched for another seven miles. The mood was one of gaiety and celebration, and the crowds and soldiers frequently engaged in singing patriotic songs as the procession of victorious soldiers snaked its way towards the reviewing stand in front of the White House, where President Andrew Johnson, Commanding General Ulysses S. Grant, senior military leaders, the Cabinet, and leading government officials awaited. The procession followed a planned route, beginning at the United States Capitol, turning onto Pennsylvania Avenue, and proceeding northwest past the United States Treasury Building toward the White House grounds. The primary reviewing stand was a wooden structure draped in patriotic bunting. As commanders reached this stand, they dismounted, ascended the steps, and formally saluted the President and the assembled Cabinet before rejoining their troops. At the head of his troops, Meade dismounted when he arrived at the reviewing stand and joined the dignitaries to salute his men, who passed for over six hours.

On the following day at 10:00 a.m., Sherman led the 65,000 men of the Army of Tennessee and the Army of Georgia. For six hours, the men who had marched through Georgia and those who had defeated John Bell Hood's army in Tennessee now paraded in front of joyous crowds lining the sidewalks. People peered from windows and rooftops for their first glimpse of this western army. Unlike Meade's army, which had more military precision, Sherman's Georgia force was trailed by a vast crowd of people who had accompanied the army from Savannah—freed slaves, laborers, adventurers, and scavengers. At the very end was a vast herd of cattle and other livestock that had been taken from Carolina farms.

=== Logistical preparations ===
The Grand Review required significant coordination within the city. Pennsylvania Avenue was cleared of debris to accommodate the procession, and temporary wooden grandstands were erected along the route for spectators and dignitaries. Federal buildings and private residences along the avenue were decorated with patriotic bunting and floral arches for the event.

Within a week after the celebrations, the two armies were disbanded and many of the volunteer regiments and batteries were sent home to be mustered out of the army.

Although there would be further minor guerrilla actions in the south, particularly with respect to armed criminal factions, such as the James-Younger Gang and racial violence in the South (including the rise of the Ku Klux Klan), military conflict on land between the North and the South had ended. The disbandment of the Union armies and the return home of fathers, brothers, and sons signaled to the population at large that they could begin their return to a normal life and that the end had finally come for the American Civil War.

Given that the Civil War provided the origins for the Memorial Day celebrations held all over the United States, today, the current National Memorial Day Parade of the American Veterans Center marches through parts of the historic parade route used during the two days of parades held in 1865.

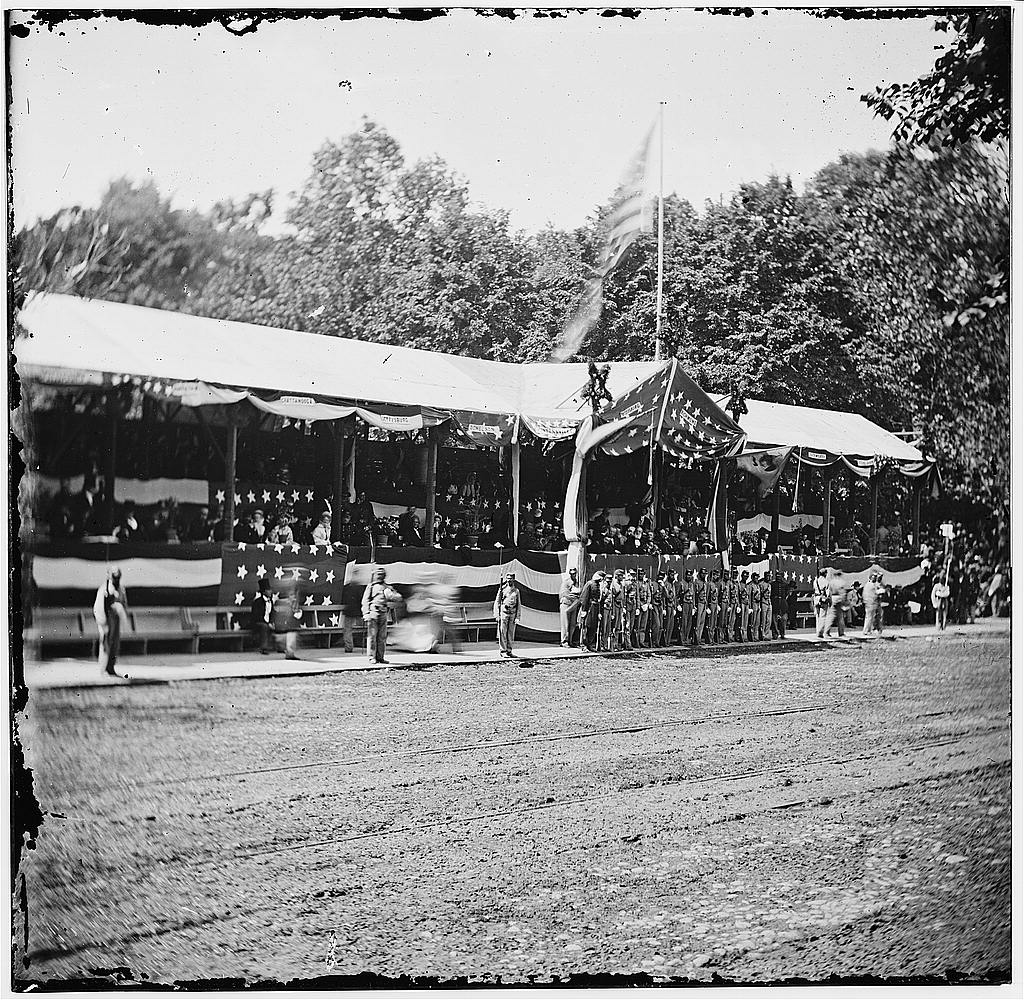
The Presidential reviewing stand

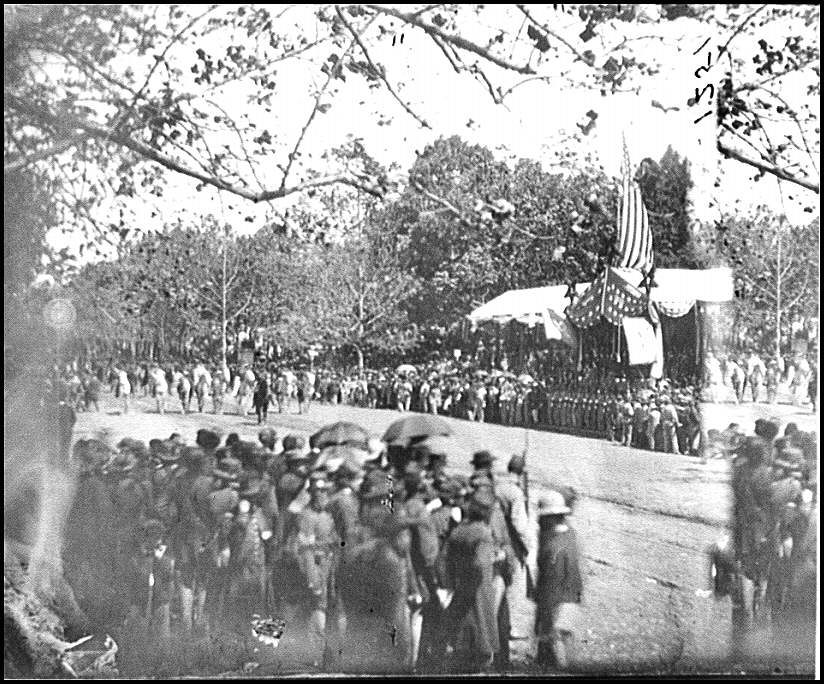
A Cavalry unit passing Presidential reviewing stand

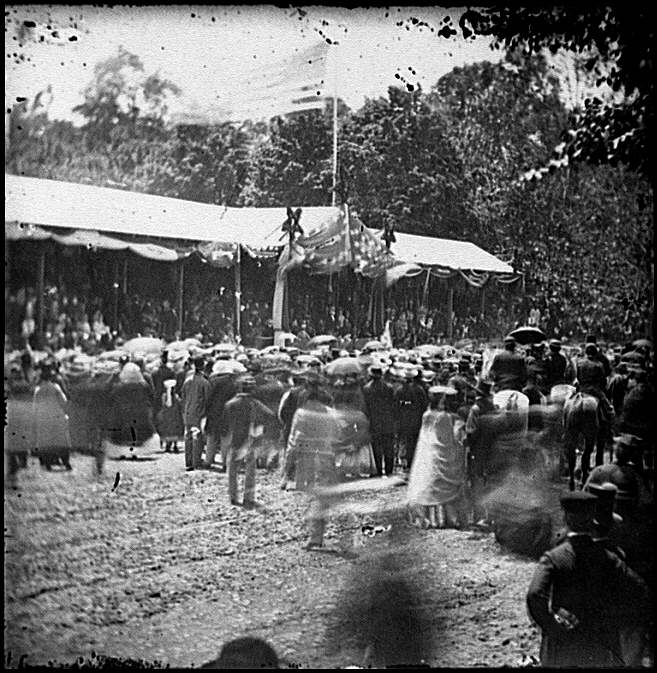
Crowd in front of Presidential reviewing stand

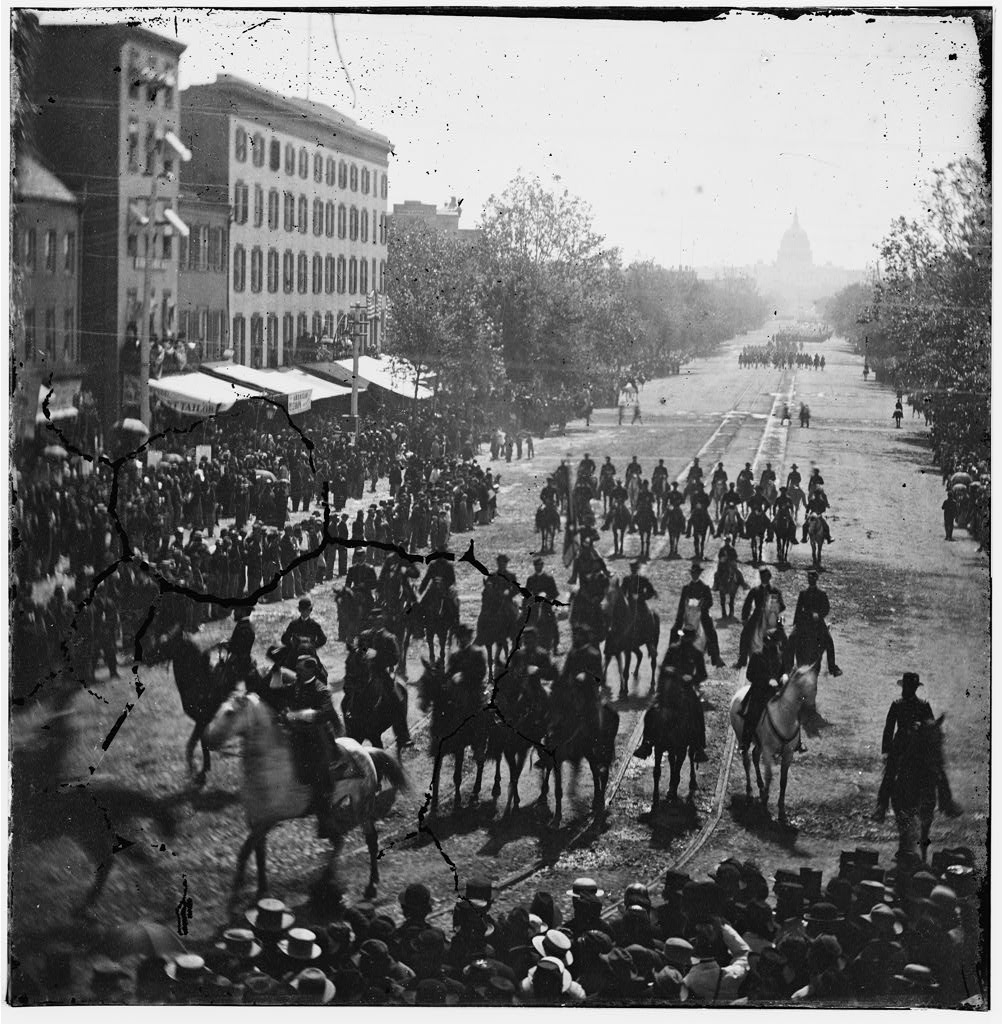
Troops marching while the crowd is watching on Pennsylvania Avenue NW

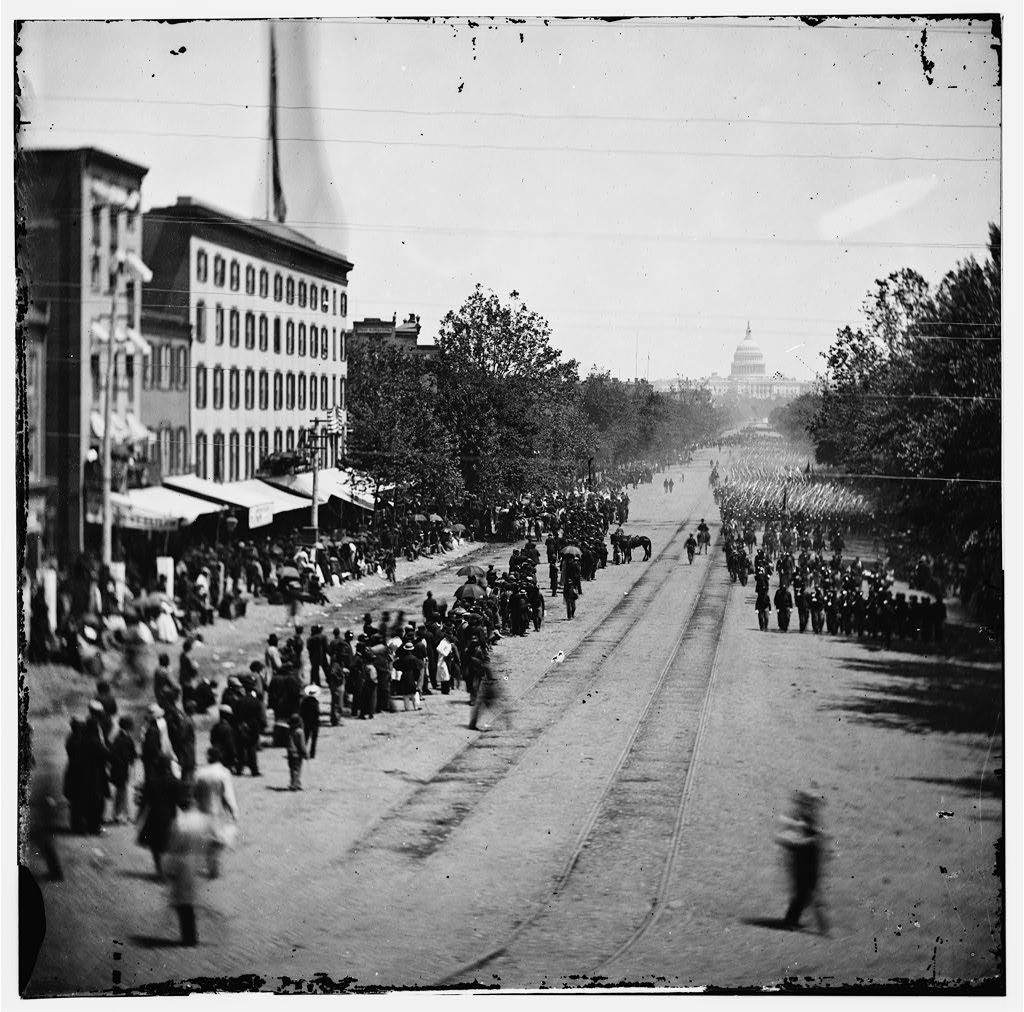
Infantry marching on Pennsylvania Avenue NW

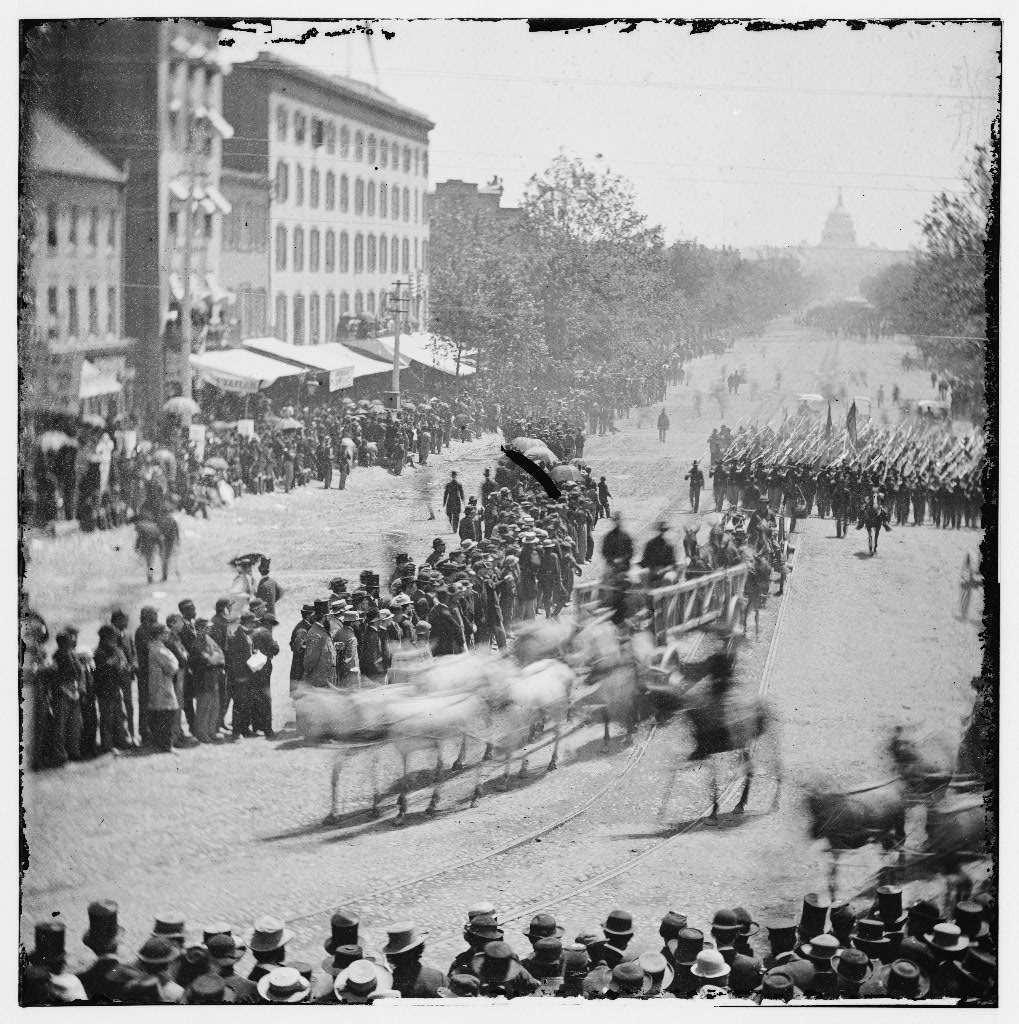
Infantry unit with fixed bayonets followed by ambulances passing on Pennsylvania near the Treasury

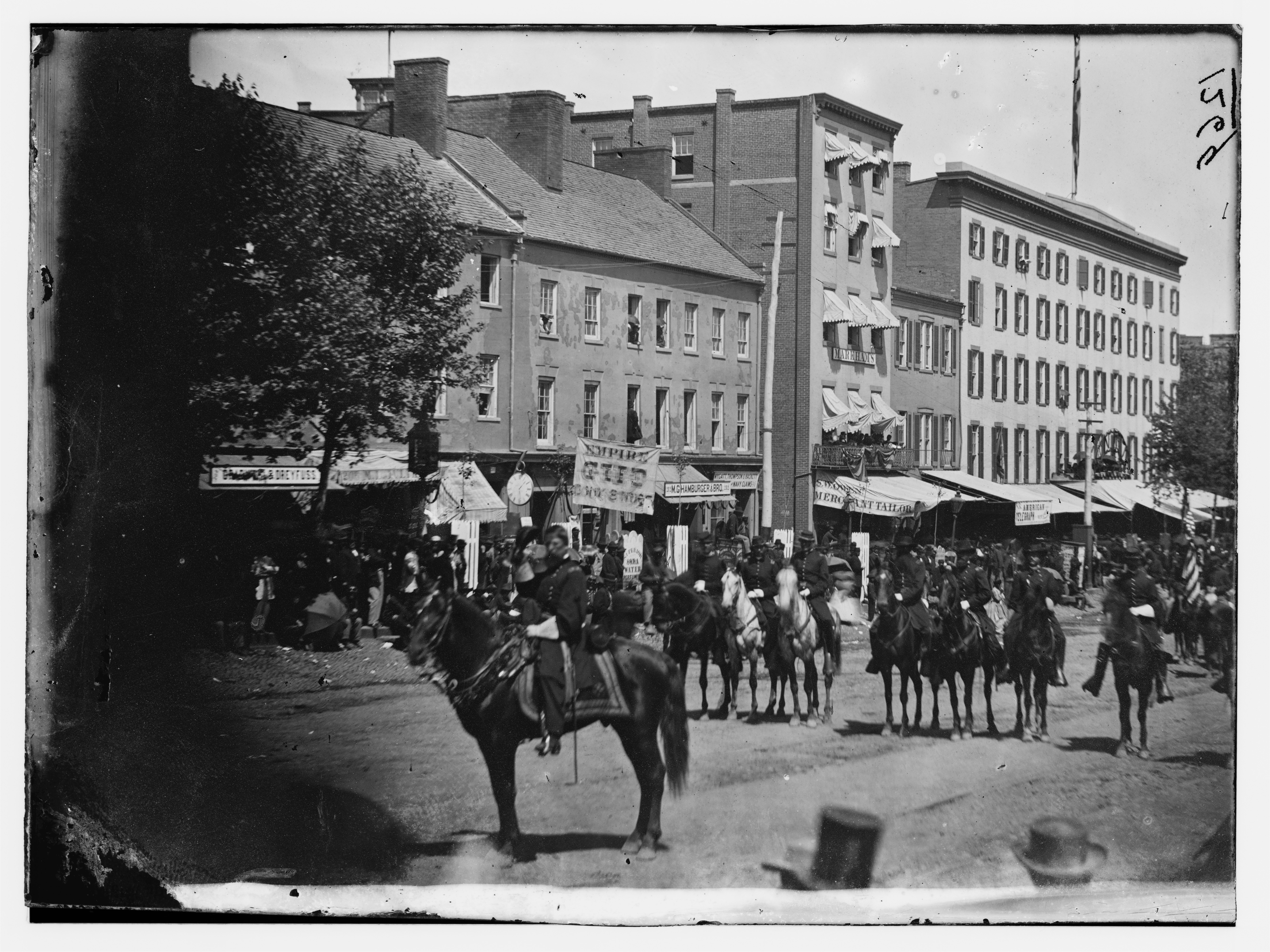
Union Troops during the Grand Review of the Armies

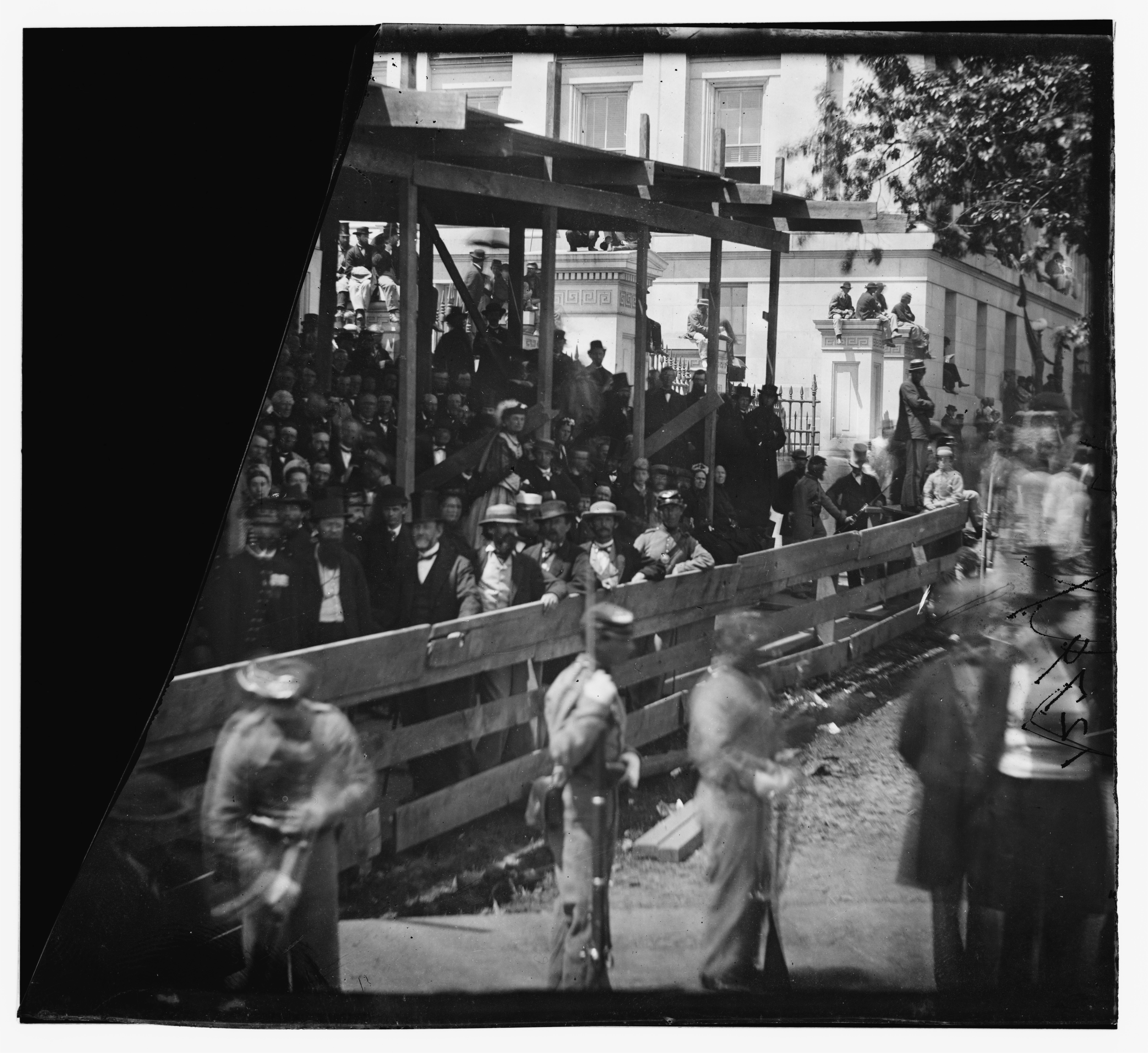
Crowd during the Grand Review of the Armies

== See also ==
- Civil War Defenses of Washington
- Washington, D.C., in the American Civil War
