= John Fitzgibbons =

American politician

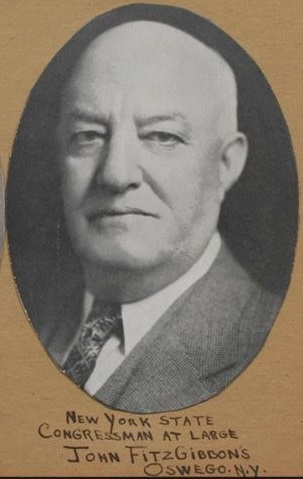

Member of the U.S. House of Representatives from New York's at-large district
- In office March 4, 1933 to January 3, 1935
- Preceded by: none (At-large)
- Succeeded by: Matthew J. Merritt; Caroline O'Day

Personal details
- Born: July 10, 1868 Glenmore, Oneida County, New York
- Died: August 4, 1941 (aged 73) Buffalo, New York
- Resting place: St. Peter's Cemetery in Oswego, New York
- Party: Democratic
- Profession: Politician

John Fitzgibbons (July 10, 1868 in Glenmore, Oneida County, New York – August 4, 1941 in Buffalo, Erie County, New York) was an American politician from New York. He served one term in the U.S. House of Representatives from 1933 to 1935.

== Life ==
His family removed to Oswego, New York, in 1870. He attended the public schools, and was employed as a railway trainman in 1885, served as legislative representative of the Brotherhood of Railroad Trainmen of New York State from 1896 to 1914 and again from February 1915 until January 1, 1933, and served as referee for the New York State Labor Bureau in 1914 and 1915.

=== Political activities ===
He was an alderman of Oswego in 1908 and 1909; and Mayor of Oswego from 1910 to 1911, and from 1918 to 1921. He was a delegate to the 1920, 1924 and 1932 Democratic National Conventions.

=== Congress ===
In 1932, he was elected at-large as a Democrat to the 73rd United States Congress, holding office from March 4, 1933, to January 3, 1935.

=== Later career and death ===
Afterwards, he resumed his post as the legislative representative for the Railroad Brotherhoods in Albany until his death in a Buffalo hospital in 1941. He was buried at the St. Peter's Cemetery in Oswego.

U.S. House of Representatives
| Preceded by none (At-large) | Member of the U.S. House of Representatives from New York's at-large congressional seat 1933–1935 alongside Elmer E. Studley | Succeeded by Matthew J. Merritt; Caroline O'Day |
