= United States Post Office (Rye, New York) =

- US Post Office-Rye
- U.S. National Register of Historic Places
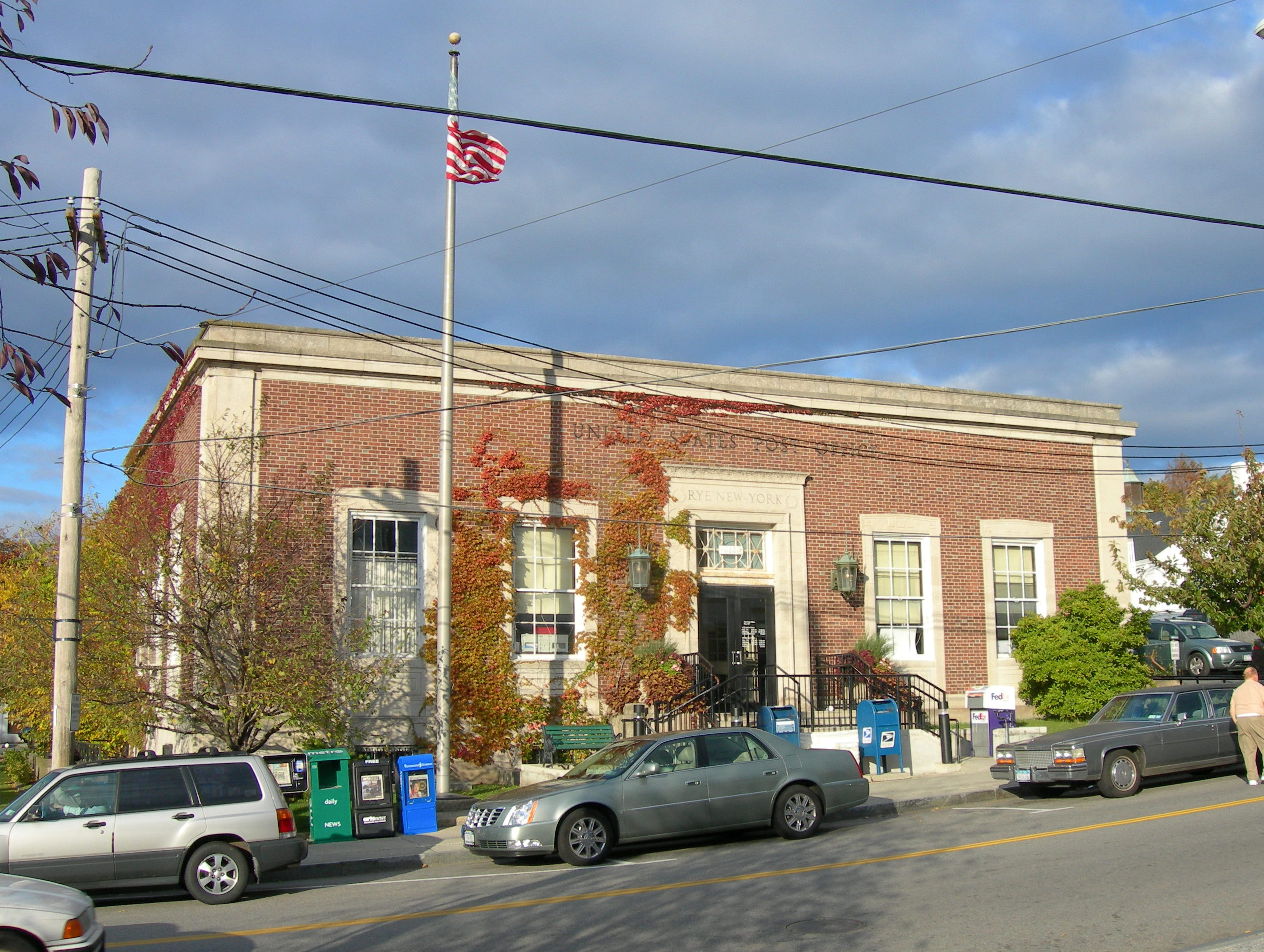
- U.S. Post Office-Rye, New York, October 2006

- Location within New York Location within the United States
- Location: 41 Purdy Ave., Rye, New York
- Coordinates: 40°59′5″N 73°40′58″W
- Area: less than one acre
- Built: 1935
- Architect: Simon, Louis A.; du Bois, Guy Pene
- Architectural style: Colonial Revival
- MPS: US Post Offices in New York State, 1858-1943, TR
- NRHP reference No.: 88002426
- Added to NRHP: May 11, 1989

US Post Office-Rye is a historic post office building located at Rye in Westchester County, New York, United States. It was built in 1935 and designed by the Office of the Supervising Architect under the direction of Louis A. Simon. It is a one-story symmetrical flat roofed building in the Colonial Revival style. The front facade features a central, recessed entrance with broad limestone surround and shallow decorated cornice. The lobby features a mural by Guy Pene du Bois painted in 1938 and titled "John Jay at His Home."

It was listed on the National Register of Historic Places in 1989.

The building was renamed the Caroline O'Day Post Office on October 23, 2010, in recognition of Congresswoman Caroline O'Day's public service.

== See also ==
- National Register of Historic Places listings in southern Westchester County, New York
