= Winifred C. Stanley =

American politician and attorney (1909–1996)

Winifred Claire Stanley
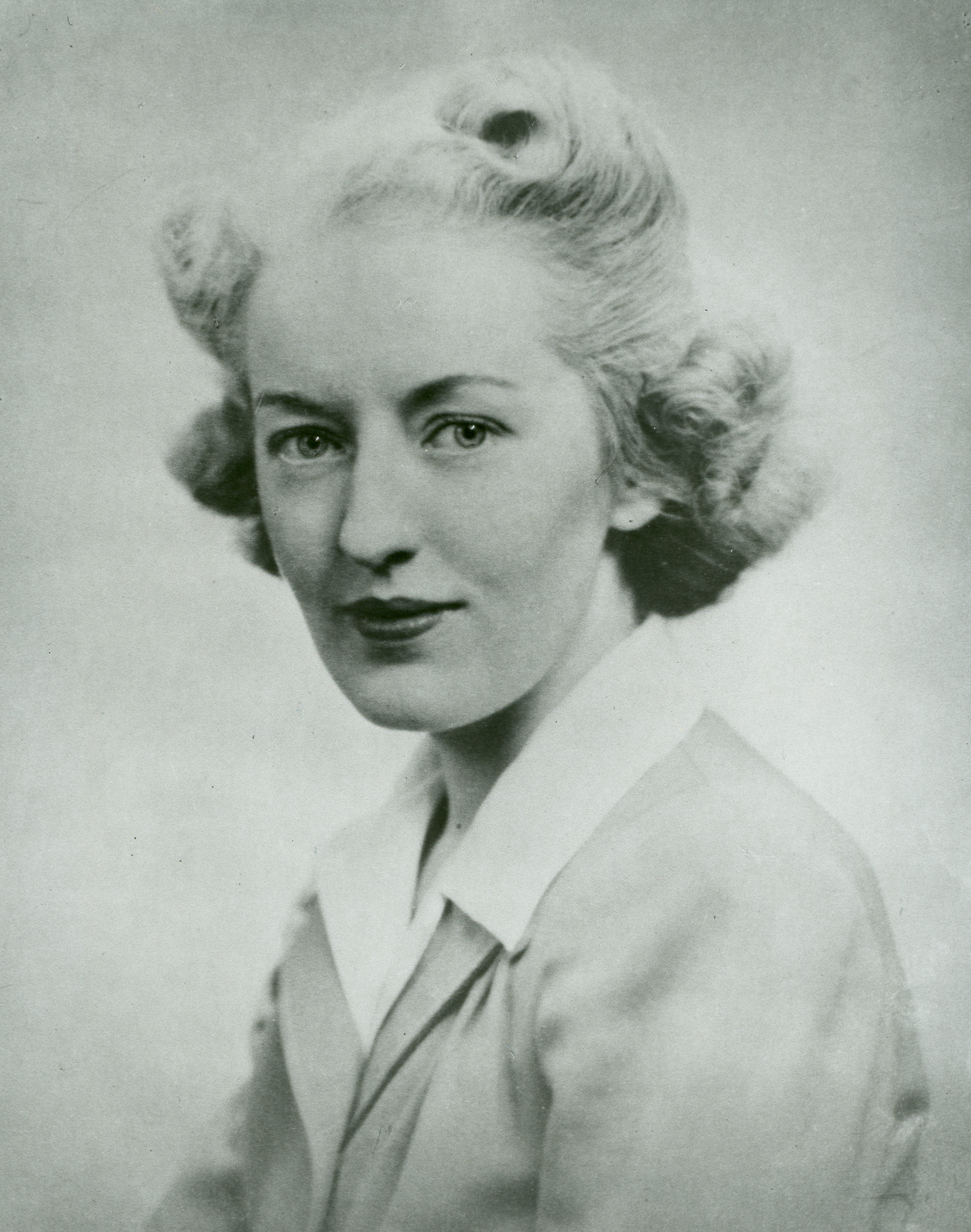

Member of the U.S. House of Representatives from New York's at-large district
- In office January 3, 1943 – January 3, 1945; Seat 2
- Preceded by: Caroline O'Day
- Succeeded by: District redistricted

Personal details
- Born: Winifred Claire Stanley; August 14, 1909 Bronx, New York, U.S.
- Died: February 29, 1996 (aged 86) Kenmore, New York, U.S.
- Resting place: Mount Olivet Cemetery, Tonawanda, New York
- Party: Republican
- Education: University at Buffalo (LLB, JD)

Winifred Claire Stanley (August 14, 1909 – February 29, 1996) was an American politician and attorney from New York affiliated with the Republican Party. Stanley is known for her vigorous women's rights advocacy during the WWII war time period, her work as a prosecutor, and for being the first female assistant district attorney in Erie County. Although Stanley served only one term before her constituency was redistricted, she used her legislative standing to champion peacetime demobilization and equal pay regardless of sex.

== Early life and education ==
Winifred C. Stanley was born to Mary and John Francis Stanley on August 14, 1909, in the Bronx, New York, the eldest of six children. Stanley's mother was an English and music teacher, and her father was an architect. Although she was born in the Bronx, she and her family spent her childhood in Buffalo, NY.

Following graduation from Lafayette High School, Stanley pursued her undergraduate degree at the University of Buffalo, eventually graduating with honors in 1930. Stanley returned to the University of Buffalo to pursue her L.L.B. and J.D., which she earned in 1933, graduating first in her class.

== Early career ==
Prior to pursuing politics, Winifred Stanley became a practicing attorney. She started this following her first year out of school in 1934 by entering the bar at age 25. She gained her legal prowess following an encounter with the New York Judicial System; Stanley found the barring of women from being able to participate on a jury absolutely abhorrent and started a movement by mobilizing different parts of society such as church societies, women's clubs, and political organizations to stand behind her endeavors. Her efforts were largely successful in acquiring the right for women to participate in jury panels in the state of New York. Her abilities did not go unnoticed by the law community as well, landing her a job with the then District Attorney Leo J. Hagerty who appointed her as the first female assistant deputy attorney in Erie County (1938-1942). Stanley accomplished this all by the age of 28 years old.

== Congressional service ==
When New York was redistricted following the 1940 Census, two seats were lost in the process. This warranted the Republican Party to search for a candidate to take a short-term seat slated for elimination. At this point in her career, Stanley was an accomplished attorney who wouldn't threaten a higher-ranking Republican when reelection came around, making her the prime candidate for the job. Stanley ran on a campaign of $6.00 and was elected to the 78th Congress in November 1942. She beat out eight other candidates for the position by garnering nearly 2 million votes. Three of the eight candidates she ran against were women; Stanley's female opponents were Flora D. Johnson (Syracuse Democrat also running on the American Labor Party's ticket), Elizabeth Gurley Flynn (New York City Communist and famed activist for workers' and women's rights), and Layle Lane (Harlem Socialist and African American educator, civil rights activist and labor organizer). Her term would start on January 3, 1943, and would run until January 3, 1945.

=== Committee assignments ===
Although Winifred Stanley vied for a position on the powerful House Judiciary Committee, she was appointed to Patents and Civil Service Committees. Her background in law inspired her inclination to be appointed to the Judiciary, however those in charge of committee assignments (such as James W. Wadsworth Jr.) opposed women in the workplace vehemently, and she received little support from her Republican colleagues due to her short-term status.

Winifred Stanley's committee appointments
| Stanley's appointed committees | Years served |
|---|---|
| Patents Committee | 1943-1945 |
| Civil Service Committee | 1943-1945 |

=== Women's rights legislative work ===
Stanley was a major advocate for women's rights in society and the workplace, as she made very clear in her efforts against the New York Judicial System. She continued this work in Congress by introducing the first equal pay for equal work bill on June 19, 1944. Stanley did this in the form of a bill to amend the NLRA (National Labor Relations Act of 1935). Her proposed amendment included a provision making it unlawful to discriminate against any employee on account of sex(HR 5056). Stanley made clear that she wanted to maintain in "peacetime the drive and energy which women have contributed to the war." She introduced HR 5056 to the House floor with the accompanying statement, "It has often been remarked that this is a 'man's world.' The war and its far-reaching effects have provided the answer. It's 'our world,' and this battered old universe needs and will need the best brains and ability of both men and women." Despite her efforts, the bill was referred to the Committee on Labor, where it expired and was never made into law.

Stanley also argued for women to be commissioned as surgeons in the US Army, as well as being a great supporter for the fight to renew the Equal Rights Amendment (ERA) in 1943.

=== Post-war planning legislative work ===
Beyond being an advocate for women's rights, Stanley was a major proponent of Post-World War II reconstruction, and was well known as a driving force in sensible post-war planning.

Stanley introduced a concurrent resolution calling for a special joint committee to discuss plausible legislation addressing postwar employment on January 24, 1944. This committee was, per her request, to deal with the influx of returning soldiers into the economy, who would flood the job market. In order to handle this effectively, Stanley suggested this be a bipartisan committee with members from every region of the country.

Legislative records show that Stanley also supported Beardsley Ruml's 1943 plan to forgive all 1942 income taxes while instating a withholding tax on all 1943 wages. She supported this in hopes that the withheld tax could bring in an easily acquired source of revenue for the federal government's war effort.

In addition to this work, Stanley made a speech in the House of Representatives' chambers proposing a resolution that would support an American delegation to the proposed United Nations (UN).

=== Other noted legislative support ===
Stanley was a noted supporter of increasing wages for postal employees, along with eliminating the poll tax.

She was a vocal opponent of New Deal programs during the 1944 campaign.

She favored protecting veteran's rights, attempting to put forth legislation for construction of more Veterans' Administration hospitals in her constituency of Upstate New York.

=== Missed votes ===
From January 1943 to December 1944, Stanley missed 8 of 156 roll call votes. This translated to missing 5.1%, better than the median of 7.1% among the lifetime records of Representatives serving in Dec 1944. The chart below reports missed votes over time.

Winifred Stanley's Voting Record
| Time period | Votes eligible | Missed votes | Percent | Percentile |
|---|---|---|---|---|
| 1943 Jan-Mar | 17 | 1 | 5.9% | 24th |
| 1943 Apr-Jun | 49 | 3 | 6.1% | 48th |
| 1943 Jul-Sep | 13 | 0 | 0.0% | 0th |
| 1943 Oct-Dec | 12 | 0 | 0.0% | 0th |
| 1944 Jan-Mar | 23 | 1 | 4.3% | 32nd |
| 1944 Apr-Jun | 32 | 2 | 6.3% | 53rd |
| 1944 Sep-Oct | 3 | 0 | 0.0% | 0th |
| 1944 Nov-Dec | 7 | 1 | 14.3% | 32nd |

== Later career ==
After her short-lived career in Congress, Stanley stayed in the public sector and was appointed to New York Governor Dewey's administration. She was appointed counsel for the State Employees' Retirement System (1945-1955) and later returned to her position as an Assistant District Attorney in Albany (1955-1979). She retired in 1979, but continued in private practice until 1986.

== Death and interment ==
Stanley died in Kenmore, NY on February 29, 1996, following an illness. She is interred in Mount Olivet Cemetery in Tonawanda, NY.

== See also ==
- Women in the United States House of Representatives

U.S. House of Representatives
| Preceded by Caroline O'Day | Member of the U.S. House of Representatives from New York's at-large congressional seat January 3, 1943 – January 3, 1945 alongside Matthew J. Merritt | Seat abolished |
