= Rose Wortis =

Wortis in 1928

Rose Wortis (August 1895 – 20 December 1958) was an American labor organizer and communist activist.

Wortis was born to Samuel Shadduck and Chia Wortis in Krasyliv, Ukraine, in August 1895. She emigrated with her family to the United States in 1903. By 1908 she was living with her mother's relatives in Brooklyn, working in a garment factory and attending night school. Wortis, like many immigrant needle workers, joined the International Ladies Garment Workers Union (ILGWU Local 25), and in 1925, she began to organize for the union.

Having been active in the Socialist Party in her youth, Wortis joined the Communist Party USA in 1919, following the turmoil caused by Russia's October Revolution two years earlier. She strove to push the ILGWU to the left, and resisted efforts to expel leftists from the union. She later served as secretary for two of the ILGWU's leftist rivals: the Trade Union Unity League and the Needle Trades Workers Industrial Union.

In the 1932 and 1934 New York state elections, Wortis stood as the Communist Party candidate for comptroller. She wrote and spoke about workers' issues, in both English and Yiddish, and was a frequent contributor to The Daily Worker, The Communist, and Morgen Freiheit. Later, Wortis found herself targeted by anti-communist campaigns, and J. Edgar Hoover named her as a Soviet agent in 1958.

Wortis died on 20 December 1958; she had been suffering from arthritis for several years.

== Selected works ==
- "Shop Delegate League in Needle Trades" (PDF). The Labor Herald. May 1922. pp. 24–25.
- "Women Needle Trade Workers Among Most Militant Fighters". The Working Woman. 1 (2). May 1929.
- "Social Democracy and the Elections" (PDF). Jewish Life. 2 (12): 24–26. October 1948.
