= 27th New York Infantry Regiment =

27th New York Infantry Regiment "Union Regiment"
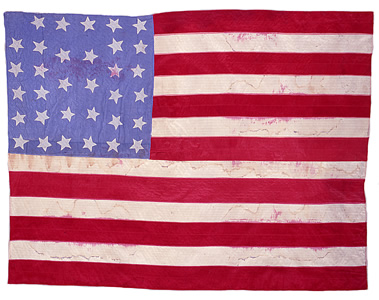
- Company H, 27th Regiment NY Infantry National Color
- Active: May 21, 1861, to May 10, 1863
- Country: United States
- Allegiance: Union
- Branch: Infantry
- Engagements: First Battle of Bull Run Battle of West Point; Siege of Yorktown; Seven Days' Battles; Second Battle of Bull Run; Battle of South Mountain; Battle of Antietam; Battle of Fredericksburg Battle of Chancellorsville

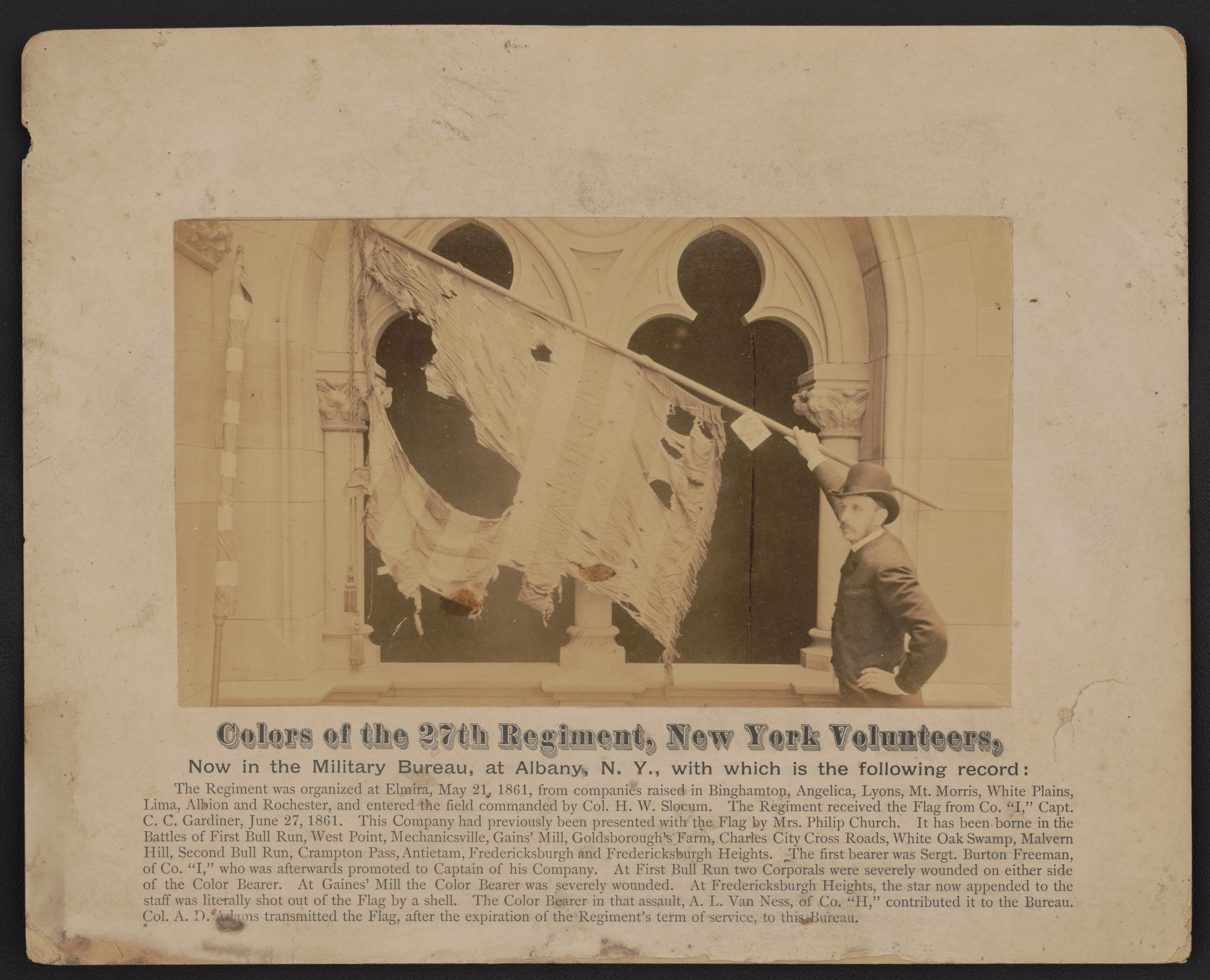
Colors of the 27th Regiment, New York Volunteers. From the Liljenquist Family Collection of Civil War Photographs, Prints and Photographs Division, Library of Congress

The 27th New York Infantry Regiment was an infantry regiment formed in Elmira, New York, to fight and defend the United States during the American Civil War. The regiment was also known as the "Union Regiment".

== History ==
The regiment was organized on May 21, 1861, at Elmira, New York. Muster was called on June 15, 1861. The unit was enrolled for two-years of service.

=== Regimental organization ===
Company A – recruited principally in Westchester County
Company B – recruited principally in Wayne County
Company C – recruited principally in Broome County
Company D – recruited principally in Broome County
Company E – recruited principally in Monroe County
Company F – recruited principally in Broome County
Company G – recruited principally in Livingston County
Company H – recruited principally in Livingston County
Company I – recruited principally in Allegany County
Company K – recruited principally in Orleans County

=== Service ===
This regiment was organized by Col. Henry W. Slocum at Elmira, New York, and accepted by the State on May 21, 1861. The regiment mustered June 15, 1861, and left New York for Washington, D.C., on July 10, 1861. They were attached to Porter's Brigade, Hunter's Division, McDowell's Army of Northeast Virginia until August 1910. Next they were attached to Heintzelman's Brigade, Division of the Potomac, to October 1861. Slocum's Brigade, Franklin's 1st Division, 1st Army Corps, Army of the Potomac, to May 1862. And 2nd Brigade, 1st Division, 6th Army Corps, to May 1863.

Advance on Manassas, Va., July 16–21, 1861. First Battle of Bull Run, Va., July 21. Duty in the Defenses of Washington, D.C., until March, 1862. Expedition to Pohick Church October 3, 1861. Advance on Manassas, Va., March 10–15, 1862. McDowell's advance on Fredericksburg April 4–12. Ordered to the Peninsula, Virginia, April 22. Siege of Yorktown, Va., April 24-May 4, on transports. West Point May 7–8. Near Mechanicsville May 20. Seven days before Richmond June 25-July 1. Gaines' Mill and Chickahominy June 27. White Oak Swamp and Glendale June 30. Malvern Hill July 1. At Harrison's Landing until August 16. Movement to Fortress Monroe, thence to Centreville August 16–28. In works at Centreville August 28–31, and cover Pope's retreat to Fairfax Court House September 1.

During the Maryland Campaign from September 6–22, they were at Crampton's Gap, South Mountain, September 14. Battle of Antietam September 16–17. Duty in Maryland until October 29. Movement to Falmouth, Va., October 29-November 19. Battle of Fredericksburg, Va., December 12–15. "Mud March" January 20–24, 1863. At Falmouth until April.

Chancellorsville Campaign April 27-May 6. Operations about Franklin's Crossing April 29-May 2. Maryes Heights, Fredericksburg, May 3. Salem Heights May 3–4. Banks' Ford May 4. Mustered out May 31, 1863, expiration of term. Three years' men transferred to 121st Regiment New York Infantry.

=== Time line ===
Date	
May 21, 1861	The Regiment Was Organized with Henry W. Slocum as Colonel
	Joseph J. Chambers as Lieutenant Colonel, and Joseph J. Bartlett as Major
June 15, 1861	The Regiment mustered into Federal Service.
July 10, 1861	Left State for Washington, D.C. by rail via Harrisburg and Baltimore.
	Attached to Porter's Brigade, Hunter's Division, McDowell's Army of Northeast Virginia
July 16–21, 1861	Advance on Manassas, Virginia
July 21, 1861	Battle of Bull Run
	The regiment lost 1 officer and 25 men killed; Colonel Henry W. Slocum, another officer and 42 men wounded; and 60 men missing. Major Joseph J. Bartlett took command of the regiment when Colonel Slocum was wounded.
August 1861	Duty in the Defenses of Washington, D.C. attached to Heintzelman's Brigade, Division of the Potomac
August 13, 1861	Lieutenant Colonel Joseph J. Chambers Resigns
September 1, 1861	Colonel Henry W. Slocum was promoted to brigadier general, Major Joseph J. Bartlett to Colonel, Captain Alexander D. Adams of Company B to Lieutenant Colonel and Captain Curtis C. Gardiner of Company I to major
October 1861	Attached to Slocum's Brigade, Franklin's Division, Army of the Potomac
October 3, 1861	Expedition to Pohick Church
March 1862	Attached to Slocum's 2nd Brigade, Franklin's 1st Division, 1st Army Corps, Army of the Potomac
March 10–15, 1862	Advance on Manassas, Virginia
April 4–12, 1862	McDowell's advance on Fredericksburg
April 22, 1862	Ordered to the Peninsula, Virginia
April 24-May 4, 1862	Siege of Yorktown, Virginia on transports.
	Attached to 2nd Brigade, 1st Division, 6th Army Corps
May 7–8, 1862	West Point
May 20, 1862	Near Mechanicsville
June 25-July 1, 1862	Seven days before Richmond
	The regiment lost 1 officer and 34 men killed or mortally wounded, 9 officers and 100 men wounded, and 18 men missing.
June 27, 1862	Gaines' Mill and Chickahominy
June 30, 1862	White Oak Swamp and Glendale
July 1, 1862	Malvern Hill
July 1862	At Harrison's Landing
July 24, 1862	Major Curtis C. Gardiner resigns, Captain Joseph H. Bodin of Company H promoted to major.
August 16–28, 1862	Movement to Fortress Monroe, then to Centreville.
August 28–31, 1862	In works at Centreville
September 1, 1862	Cover Pope's retreat to Fairfax Court House
September 6, 1862	Maryland Campaign Col Joseph J. Bartlett in charge of the whole Brigade.
September 14, 1862	Crampton's Gap, South Mountain led by Lieutenant Colonel Alexander D. Adams in the Assault
	The regiment lost 9 men killed or mortally wounded, and 2 officers and 22 men wounded.
September 16–17, 1862	Battle of Antietam also led by Lieutenant Colonel Alexander D. Adams no real engagement in the Battle.
September 1861	Duty in Maryland
October 29 - November 19, 1862	Movement to Falmouth, Virginia
October 4–8, 1862	Colonel Joseph J. Bartlett promoted to brigadier general, Lieutenant Colonel Alexander D. Adams to colonel, Major Joseph H. Bodin to lieutenant colonel and Captain George G. Wanzer of Company E promoted to major.
December 12–15, 1862	Battle of Fredericksburg, Virginia
January 20–24, 1863	"Mud March"
February 1863	At Falmouth
April 27-May 6, 1863	Chancellorsville Campaign
April 29-May 2, 1863	Operations about Franklin's Crossing
May 3, 1863	Marye's Heights, Fredericksburg
May 3–4, 1863	Salem Heights
May 4, 1863	Banks' Ford
May 31, 1863	Mustered out, expiration of term, under Colonel Alexander D. Adams, Lieutenant Colonel Joseph H. Bodin and Major George G. Wanzer. Three years' men transferred to 121st Regiment New York Infantry.

=== Total strength and casualties ===
Regiment lost during service 2 Officers and 72 Enlisted men killed and mortally wounded and 2 Officers and 70 Enlisted men by disease. Total 146.
