= Elmer E. Studley =

American politician (1869–1942)

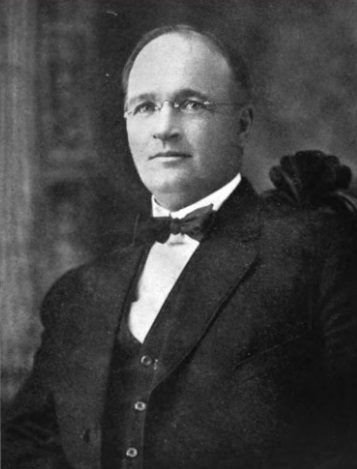

Member of the U.S. House of Representatives from New York's At large district
- In office March 4, 1933 – January 3, 1935
- Preceded by: none (at-large district)
- Succeeded by: Matthew J. Merritt

Personal details
- Born: William Ebenezer Studley; September 24, 1869 East Ashford, Cattaraugus County, New York, US
- Died: September 6, 1942 (aged 72) Flushing, New York, US
- Resting place: Flushing Cemetery
- Party: Democratic
- Education: Cornell University (BA)

Elmer Ebenezer Studley (1869–1942) was an American lawyer and politician from New York. From 1933 to 1935, he served one term in the U.S. House of Representatives.

== Life ==
Elmer E. Studley was born on a farm near East Ashford, New York on September 24, 1869. He graduated from Cornell University in 1894, where he was a member of the Quill and Dagger society. He was a reporter for Buffalo newspapers in 1894 and 1895.

=== Lawyer ===
He studied law, was admitted to the bar in 1895 and practiced in Buffalo.

=== Spanish-American War ===
He was commissioned as a first lieutenant in the Two Hundred and Second Regiment, New York Volunteer Infantry, serving in the Spanish–American War in 1898 and 1899.

=== Early career ===
He removed to Raton, Colfax County, New Mexico, in 1899 and practiced law there until 1917. He was a Republican member of the Territorial New Mexico House of Representatives in 1907. He was a member of the New Mexico Statutory Revision Commission in 1907 and was District Attorney of Colfax and Union counties from 1909 to 1910.

He was a delegate to the Progressive National Convention at Chicago in 1916. In 1917, he moved to New York City, and continued the practice of law.

Studley was Deputy New York State Attorney General in 1924 and was United States commissioner for the Eastern District of New York in 1925 and 1926.

=== Congress ===
In 1932, he was elected at-large as a Democrat to the 73rd United States Congress, holding office from March 4, 1933, to January 3, 1935.

=== Later career and death ===
Afterwards he resumed the practice of law. In February 1935 he was appointed by President Franklin D. Roosevelt as a member of the Board of Veterans' Appeals and served until his death.

Studley died at his home in Flushing on September 6, 1942, was buried at the Flushing Cemetery.

U.S. House of Representatives
Preceded by none (at-large)	Member of the U.S. House of Representatives from New York's at-large congressional seat 1933–1935 alongside John Fitzgibbons	Succeeded by Matthew J. Merritt; Caroline O'Day
