= New York's at-large congressional seat =

Obsolete congressional district

Coordinates: 43°N 76°W

New York's at-large congressional district
- Obsolete district
- Created: 1870; 1880; 1930
- Eliminated: 1875; 1885; 1940
- Years active: 1873–1875; 1883–1885; 1933–1945

On three occasions in New York history, some members of the United States House of Representatives were elected statewide at-large. This was due to an increase of the number of representatives after the previous federal census, and the failure of the State Legislature to re-apportion the congressional districts in time for the next election.

In 1872 and 1882, one representative each was elected for the ensuing term. The Legislature then re-apportioned the congressional districts before the elections in 1874 and 1884.

From 1933 to 1945, two representatives elected at-large sat in the House because the Legislature could not agree on a re-apportionment of the districts. For the election to the 79th United States Congress, which was held in 1944, the congressional districts were finally re-apportioned.

== List of members representing the district ==
=== 1873–1875: one seat ===
New York gained one seat following the 1870 census.

Representative	Party	Years	Cong ress	Electoral history
Lyman Tremain (Albany)	Republican	March 4, 1873 – March 3, 1875	43rd	Elected in 1872. Retired.

=== 1883–1885: one seat ===
New York gained one seat following the 1880 census.

Representative	Party	Years	Cong ress	Electoral history
Henry W. Slocum (Brooklyn)	Democratic	March 4, 1883 – March 3, 1885	48th	Elected in 1882. [data missing]

=== 1933–1945: two seats ===
New York gained two seats following the 1930 census.

Years	Cong ress	Seat A			Seat B		
Years	Cong ress	Representative	Party	Electoral history	Representative	Party	Electoral history
March 4, 1933 – January 3, 1935	73rd	John Fitzgibbons (Oswego)	Democratic	Elected in 1932. Retired.	Elmer E. Studley (Queens)	Democratic	Elected in 1932. Retired.
January 3, 1935 – January 3, 1943	74th 75th 76th 77th	Matthew J. Merritt (Queens)	Democratic	Elected in 1934. Re-elected in 1936. Re-elected in 1938. Re-elected in 1940. Re-elected in 1942. Retired.	Caroline O'Day (Rye)	Democratic	Elected in 1934. Re-elected in 1936. Re-elected in 1938. Re-elected in 1940. Retired.
January 3, 1943 – January 3, 1945	78th	Matthew J. Merritt (Queens)	Democratic	Elected in 1934. Re-elected in 1936. Re-elected in 1938. Re-elected in 1940. Re-elected in 1942. Retired.	Winifred C. Stanley (Buffalo)	Republican	Elected in 1942. Retired.
