= Caroline Love Goodwin O'Day =

American politician (1869–1943)

Caroline O'Day
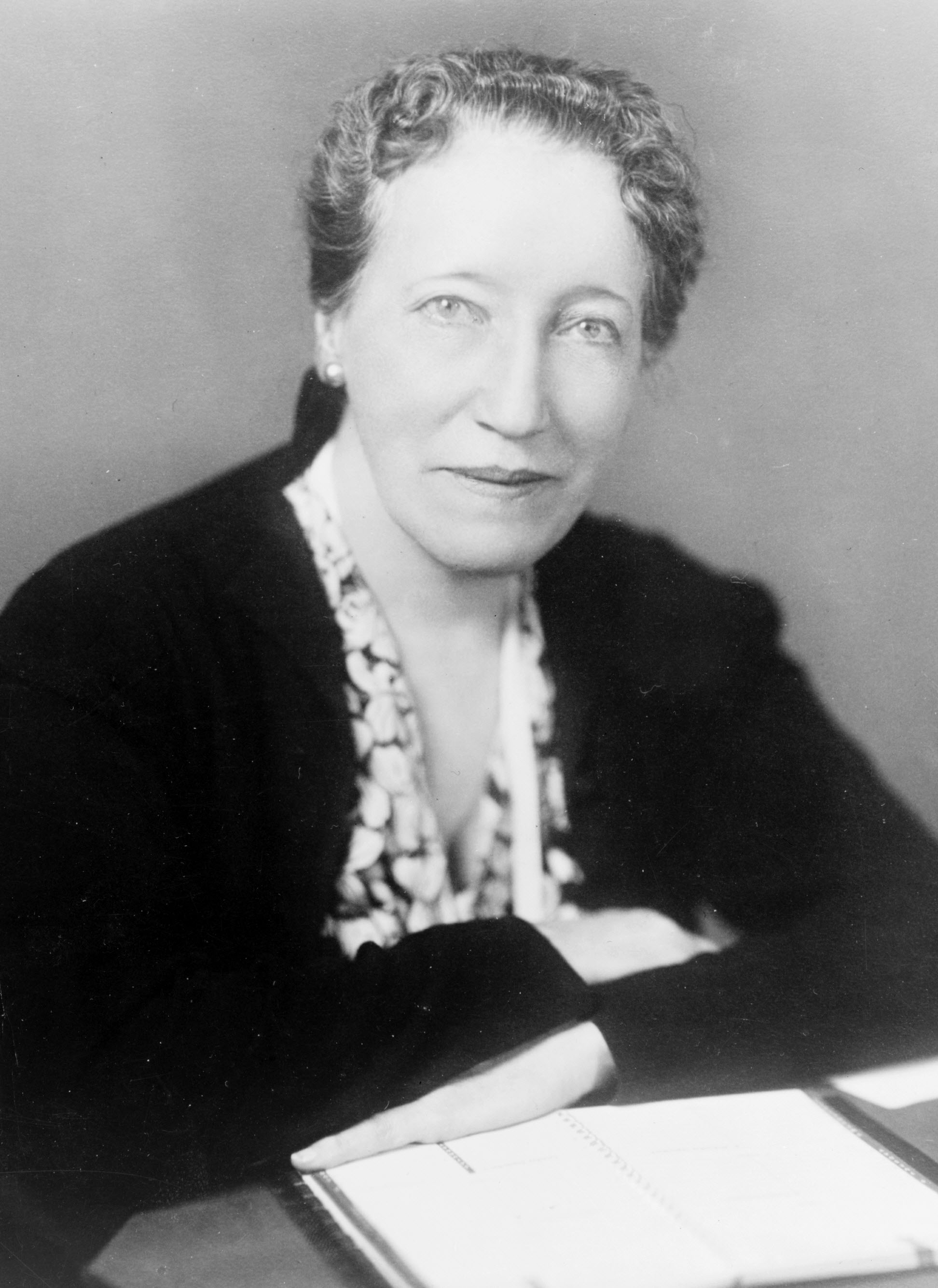

Member of the U.S. House of Representatives from New York's at-large district
- In office January 3, 1935 – January 3, 1943; Seat 2
- Preceded by: Elmer Studley
- Succeeded by: Winifred Stanley

Personal details
- Born: Caroline Love Goodwin; June 22, 1869 Perry, Georgia, U.S.
- Died: January 4, 1943 (aged 73) Rye, New York, U.S.
- Resting place: Kensico Cemetery in Valhalla, New York
- Party: Democratic
- Spouse: Daniel O'Day
- Children: 4
- Education: Lucy Cobb Institute
- Occupation: Politician, social welfare advocate, art student

Caroline Love Goodwin O'Day (June 22, 1869 – January 4, 1943) was an American politician and social welfare advocate who served four terms in the United States House of Representatives from 1935 to 1943, representing New York at-large. She was the third woman elected to Congress from New York and the first Democratic woman to represent the state in the House of Representatives.

O'Day played a significant role in New Deal social welfare legislation and was a prominent advocate for civil rights during her tenure in Congress. She served as chairwoman of the House Committee on Election of President, Vice President, and Representatives and was instrumental in the passage of the Wagner-O'Day Act, which provided employment opportunities for people with disabilities.

== Early life and education ==
Caroline Love Goodwin was born on June 22, 1869, in Perry, Georgia, to Sidney Prior Goodwin and Mary Elia Warren Goodwin. Her father was a member of the planter class who owned property in Savannah, Georgia, and served as a lieutenant in the Oglethorpe Light Infantry of the Confederate States Army during the American Civil War. Sidney Goodwin surrendered with his unit and was paroled in April 1865 following the Confederate surrender.

The Goodwin family traced their lineage to Ozias Goodwin, who emigrated from England to Massachusetts Bay Colony in 1639. Caroline was the eldest of several children and was known within her family by the nickname "Carrie."

Caroline attended the Lucy Cobb Institute in Athens, Georgia, a prestigious finishing school for young women that emphasized both academic subjects and social graces. Following her graduation, she pursued artistic studies in Europe, spending time in Paris, Munich, and Holland, where she developed skills in painting and the visual arts that would influence her later cultural interests.

== Marriage and family life ==
On April 20, 1901, Caroline married Daniel O'Day, a prominent businessman who served as secretary and treasurer of the Standard Oil Company. Daniel O'Day was one of the key executives in John D. Rockefeller's oil empire and had amassed considerable wealth through his business ventures.

The marriage brought Caroline into New York's social and political elite, and the couple settled in Rye, New York, where they raised four children. Daniel O'Day's business success provided Caroline with the financial independence that would later enable her to pursue political and social causes without concern for personal economic security.

== Early political and social involvement ==
=== Local engagement ===
O'Day's entry into public life began at the local level in Rye, where she demonstrated a commitment to educational reform. She served as president of the Rye School Board, where she advocated for improved educational facilities and expanded curriculum offerings. Her work on the school board reflected her belief that quality education was fundamental to democratic society and social progress.

=== State-level social welfare work ===
From 1923 to 1934, O'Day served as a commissioner on the New York State Board of Social Welfare, a position that gave her extensive experience with social policy and welfare administration. During her tenure, she helped develop policies addressing child welfare, mental health services, and support for economically disadvantaged families. This experience would prove invaluable when she later worked on federal social welfare legislation in Congress.

Her work on the State Board of Social Welfare occurred during a period of significant social and economic change in New York, as the state grappled with the effects of urbanization, immigration, and later, the onset of the Great Depression. O'Day advocated for evidence-based approaches to social welfare and supported the expansion of state services to meet growing needs.

== Democratic Party leadership ==
O'Day's involvement with the Democratic Party began during the Progressive Era and continued throughout her life. She served as vice chairwoman of the New York State Democratic Committee from 1916 to 1920, during a period when the party was rebuilding its organization and appeal following electoral defeats.

From 1923 to 1942, she held the position of associate chairwoman of the state committee, making her one of the most influential women in New York Democratic politics. In this role, she helped recruit candidates, organize campaigns, and develop party positions on key issues. Her work was particularly important in building support for Democratic candidates among women voters following the ratification of the Nineteenth Amendment in 1920.

O'Day served as a delegate to four consecutive Democratic National Conventions: 1924, 1928, 1932, and 1936. At these conventions, she supported progressive candidates and policies, including the nomination of Franklin D. Roosevelt in 1932.

== Congressional career ==
=== Elections ===
O'Day was elected to Congress in 1934, running at-large from New York, a system used by the state due to reapportionment following the 1930 United States census. She was reelected in 1936, 1938, and 1940, serving from January 3, 1935, to January 3, 1943, in the 74th, 75th, 76th, and 77th United States Congresses.

Her elections made her a trailblazer for women in New York politics. She was the third woman elected to Congress from New York, following Jeannette Rankin (who represented Montana) and Ruth Baker Pratt, but she was the first Democratic woman to represent New York in the House.

=== Committee assignments and leadership ===
During her tenure in Congress, O'Day served on several committees, most notably as chairwoman of the Committee on Election of President, Vice President, and Representatives during the 75th through 77th Congresses. This committee handled matters related to electoral procedures and voting rights, positioning O'Day as a key figure in discussions about democratic processes and electoral reform.

Her chairmanship of this committee was particularly significant during a period when questions about voting rights and electoral access were becoming increasingly important. The committee addressed issues related to the Electoral College, voter registration procedures, and the mechanics of federal elections.

=== Major legislation ===
==== Wagner-O'Day Act ====
O'Day's most significant legislative achievement was her co-sponsorship of the Wagner-O'Day Act of 1938, landmark legislation that created employment opportunities for people who were blind or had other disabilities. The act, which she co-sponsored with Senator Robert F. Wagner of New York, established a program requiring federal agencies to purchase certain products and services from qualified nonprofit agencies employing people with disabilities.

The Wagner-O'Day Act represented a new approach to disability policy, moving away from purely charitable models toward employment-based support that emphasized the productive capacity of people with disabilities. The legislation was later expanded and renamed the Javits-Wagner-O'Day Act, and it continues to operate today as the AbilityOne Program.

==== Other New Deal legislation ====
As a supporter of President Roosevelt's New Deal, O'Day voted for most major New Deal programs, including the Social Security Act, the Fair Labor Standards Act, and various relief and recovery measures. She was particularly supportive of legislation addressing unemployment, poverty, and social welfare, drawing on her experience with the New York State Board of Social Welfare.

Her support for New Deal programs reflected her belief that government had a responsibility to address economic inequality and provide a social safety net for vulnerable populations. She frequently spoke on the House floor about the need for federal action to address the social and economic challenges facing the nation during the Depression era.

== Civil rights advocacy ==
=== Marian Anderson controversy ===
One of O'Day's most notable stands on civil rights came in 1939 when she publicly criticized the Daughters of the American Revolution (DAR) for refusing to allow Marian Anderson, the renowned African American contralto, to perform at DAR Constitution Hall in Washington, D.C.

O'Day's criticism was part of a broader controversy that also involved Eleanor Roosevelt, who resigned her membership in the DAR in protest. The incident highlighted O'Day's commitment to racial equality and her willingness to take public stands on controversial civil rights issues, even when doing so might have been politically costly.

The controversy ultimately led to Anderson's famous concert at the Lincoln Memorial on Easter Sunday 1939, attended by an integrated audience of 75,000 people. O'Day's support for Anderson reflected her broader commitment to civil rights and racial justice during a period when such positions were not universally accepted within the Democratic Party.

=== Anti-lynching legislation ===
O'Day also supported federal anti-lynching legislation, including the Costigan–Wagner Bill, which sought to make lynching a federal crime. Although the legislation was ultimately unsuccessful due to filibusters in the Senate, O'Day's support represented her commitment to federal action against racial violence.

Her position on anti-lynching legislation placed her at odds with some Southern Democrats but aligned her with civil rights organizations such as the NAACP and with other progressive Democrats from Northern states. This stance reflected her belief that the federal government had a responsibility to protect the civil rights of all citizens.

== Women's rights and political participation ==
Throughout her career, O'Day was an advocate for women's political participation and women's rights more broadly. She mentored other women seeking to enter politics and worked to increase female representation in Democratic Party leadership positions.

O'Day supported the Equal Rights Amendment, which was first introduced in Congress during her tenure, though she also recognized the concerns of some women's organizations that worried the amendment might eliminate protective labor legislation for women. Her position reflected the complex debates within the women's movement during the 1930s and 1940s about the best strategies for achieving gender equality.

== Personal life and interests ==
Outside of politics, O'Day maintained interests in the arts and cultural activities, reflecting her early training in Europe. She was involved with various cultural organizations in New York and supported programs that brought arts education to underserved communities.

Her marriage to Daniel O'Day provided her with financial security but also created some political challenges, as critics sometimes questioned whether her wealth made her out of touch with ordinary Americans struggling during the Depression. O'Day addressed these concerns by emphasizing her work with social welfare agencies and her advocacy for New Deal programs designed to help working families.

== Death and legacy ==
Caroline O'Day died on January 4, 1943, in Rye, New York, just one day after completing her fourth and final term in Congress. She was 73 years old and had been in declining health during her final months in office. She was buried at Kensico Cemetery in Valhalla, New York, where her grave became a site visited by women's rights advocates and political historians.

=== Legislative legacy ===
O'Day's most enduring legislative legacy is the Wagner-O'Day Act, which established the foundation for federal programs supporting employment for people with disabilities. The program created by this legislation has evolved over the decades but continues to provide employment opportunities for thousands of Americans with disabilities through the modern AbilityOne Program.

Her work on civil rights, particularly her support for Marian Anderson and anti-lynching legislation, helped lay groundwork for the broader civil rights movement that would gain momentum in the decades following her death. While O'Day did not live to see the major civil rights victories of the 1950s and 1960s, her advocacy during the 1930s and early 1940s contributed to changing attitudes about racial equality and federal responsibility for protecting civil rights.

=== Recognition and honors ===
On October 23, 2010, the United States Post Office in Rye was renamed the Caroline O'Day Post Office in recognition of her public service and her connection to the community. The legislation authorizing this change was sponsored by Representative Nita Lowey, who noted O'Day's pioneering role as a woman in Congress and her advocacy for social justice.

=== Historical significance ===
Historians have noted O'Day's significance as part of a generation of women who entered politics during the New Deal era and helped establish the federal government's role in addressing social and economic problems. Her career illustrates the ways in which women politicians of the era combined traditional concerns about social welfare with emerging ideas about civil rights and federal responsibility.

O'Day's work also demonstrates the important role that wealthy women played in progressive politics during the Depression era, using their resources and social positions to advocate for policies that benefited less privileged Americans. Her ability to bridge different constituencies – from disability rights advocates to civil rights organizations to women's groups – made her an effective legislative coalition builder.

== See also ==
- Women in the United States House of Representatives
- History of women in the United States
- New Deal
- Wagner-O'Day Act
- Civil rights movement
- Women's suffrage in the United States

U.S. House of Representatives
Preceded by Elmer Studley	Member of the U.S. House of Representatives from New York's at-large congressional district Seat 2; 1935–1943	Succeeded by Winifred Stanley
Preceded by Thomas Fletcher	Chairperson of the House Elections Committee; 1937–1943	Succeeded by Eugene Worley
