= 1972 United States presidential election in Illinois =

- November 7, 1972
- Turnout: 75.99% ▼5.4 pp

Nominee	Richard Nixon	George McGovern
Party	Republican	Democratic
Home state	California	South Dakota
Running mate	Spiro Agnew	Sargent Shriver
Electoral vote	26	0
Popular vote	2,788,179	1,913,472
Percentage	59.03%	40.51%
County results
Nixon
50–60%
60–70%
70–80%
McGovern
50–60%
President before election
Richard Nixon
Republican
Elected President
Richard Nixon
Republican

The 1972 United States presidential election in Illinois was held on November 7, 1972, as part of the 1972 United States presidential election. Incumbent Republican President Richard Nixon won the state of Illinois with 59.03 percent of the vote, carrying the state's 26 electoral votes. He defeated his main opponent, Democratic candidate George McGovern, in Illinois by a large margin of 18.52%, though due to the magnitude of his overall victory, this still left Illinois 4.63% more Democratic than the nation.

Nixon won 101 of Illinois' 102 counties. McGovern's only victory came in Jackson County, home to Southern Illinois University Carbondale, which notably had voted for Nixon in the previous election and was one of six counties outside McGovern's home state of South Dakota to switch from Republican to Democratic at this election. (Note: The others were Pitkin County, Colorado, Stevens County, Minnesota, Rusk County, Wisconsin, Washtenaw County, Michigan and Athens County, Ohio.) Nixon thus became the first Republican to win the White House without carrying this county since Benjamin Harrison in 1888.

As of the 2024 presidential election, this is the last time in which Cook County, which hosts Chicago, and St. Clair County voted Republican, and the last until 2016 when Alexander County supported a Republican nominee.

== Primaries ==
The primaries and general elections coincided with those for other federal offices (Senate and House) and those for state offices.

=== Turnout ===
Turnout in the primaries was 22.54%, with a total of 1,258,713 votes cast.

Turnout in the general election was 75.99%, with a total of 4,723,236 votes cast. State-run primaries were held for the Democratic and Republican parties on March 21.

=== Democratic ===
1972 Illinois Democratic presidential primary
- March 21, 1972

153 Democratic National Convention delegates
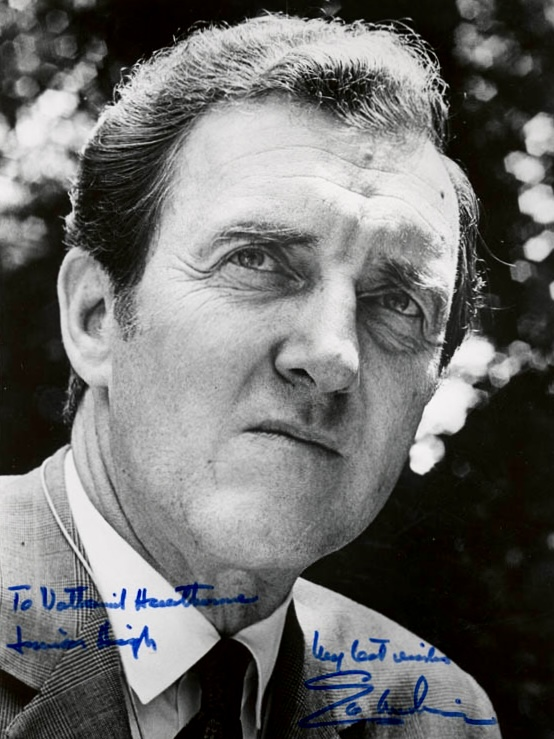

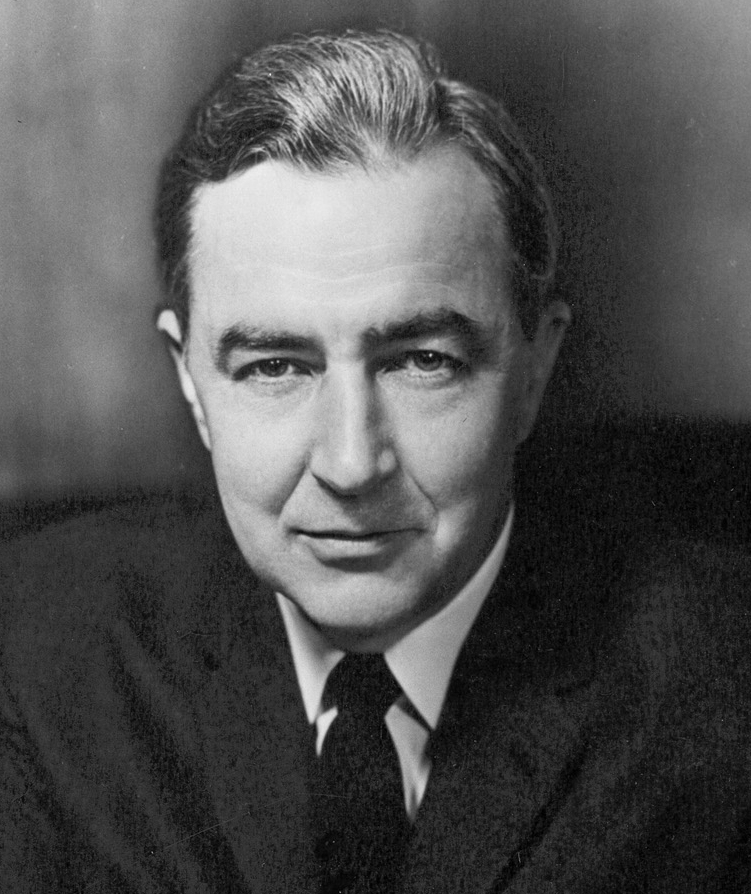

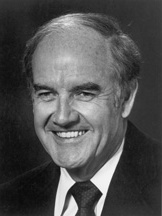
Candidate	Edmund Muskie	Eugene McCarthy	George McGovern
Home state	Maine	Minnesota	South Dakota
Delegate count	59	0	3
Popular vote	766,914	444,260	3,687
Percentage	62.60%	36.26%	0.30%
County Results
Muskie
50-60%
60-70%
70-80%
80-90%
McCarthy
40-50%
50-60%

The 1972 Illinois Democratic presidential primary was held on March 21, 1972, in the U.S. state of Illinois as one of the Democratic Party's statewide nomination contests ahead of the 1972 presidential election.

The popular vote was a "beauty contest". Delegates were instead selected by direct-vote in each congressional districts on delegate candidates, who had either pledged to support a candidate or been uncommitted.

1972 Democratic presidential primary
Candidate	Votes	%	Delegates
Edmund S. Muskie	766,914	62.60	59
Eugene J. McCarthy	444,260	36.26	0
George Wallace (write-in)	7,017	0.57	0
George S. McGovern (write-in)	3,687	0.30	3
Hubert H. Humphrey (write-in)	1,476	0.12	0
Shirley Chisholm (write-in)	777	0.06	0
Henry Jackson (write-in)	442	0.04	0
Edward M. Kennedy (write-in)	242	0.02	0
John V. Lindsay (write-in)	118	0.01	0
Other write-ins	211	0.02	0
Uncommitted	—N/a	—N/a	88
Totals	1,225,144	100	153

=== Republican ===
1972 Illinois Republican presidential primary
- March 21, 1972
Candidate	Richard Nixon
Home state	California
Popular vote	32,550
Percentage	96.97%

The 1972 Illinois Republican presidential primary was held on March 21, 1972, in the U.S. state of Illinois as one of the Republican Party's statewide nomination contests ahead of the 1972 presidential election.

In this election, all candidates were write-ins.

The popular vote was a "beauty contest". Delegates were instead selected by direct-vote in each congressional district on delegate candidates, who had either pledged their support to a candidate or indicated their intent to enter the convention uncommitted to any candidate.

1972 Republican presidential primary
Candidate	Votes	%	Delegates
Richard Nixon (incumbent) (write-in)	32,550	96.97	
George Wallace (write-in)	516	1.54	
John Ashbrook (write-in)	170	0.51	
Pete McCloskey (write-in)	47	0.14	
Spiro Agnew (write-in)	35	0.10	
Other write-ins	251	0.75	
Totals	33,569	100	

== Results ==
1972 United States presidential election in Illinois
Party	Candidates	Votes	Percentage	Electoral votes
Republican	Richard M. Nixon (incumbent)/Spiro T. Agnew (incumbent)	2,788,179	59.03%	26
Democratic	George McGovern/R. Sargent Shriver	1,913,472	40.51%	0
Socialist Labor	Louis Fisher/Genevieve Gunderson	12,344	0.26%	0
Communist	Gus Hall/Jarvis Tyner	4,541	0.10%	0
Write-in	John Schmitz	2,471	0.05%	0
Other write-ins	—	2,229	0.05%	0
Totals		4,723,236	100.0%	26

=== Results by county ===
County	Richard Nixon Republican		George McGovern Democratic		Louis Fisher Socialist Labor		Various candidates Other parties		Margin		Total votes cast
County	#	%	#	%	#	%	#	%	#	%	Total votes cast
Adams	20,731	69.46%	9,055	30.34%	57	0.19%	3	0.01%	11,676	39.12%	29,846
Alexander	3,669	59.09%	2,482	39.97%	49	0.79%	9	0.14%	1,187	19.12%	6,209
Bond	4,475	62.30%	2,704	37.64%	4	0.06%	0	0.00%	1,771	24.66%	7,183
Boone	7,003	68.89%	3,131	30.80%	29	0.29%	2	0.02%	3,872	38.09%	10,165
Brown	1,780	58.90%	1,203	39.81%	36	1.19%	3	0.10%	577	19.09%	3,022
Bureau	12,786	67.47%	6,133	32.36%	22	0.12%	11	0.06%	6,653	35.11%	18,952
Calhoun	1,705	56.51%	1,299	43.06%	13	0.43%	0	0.00%	406	13.45%	3,017
Carroll	6,041	69.99%	2,571	29.79%	18	0.21%	1	0.01%	3,470	40.20%	8,631
Cass	4,414	61.14%	2,803	38.83%	1	0.01%	1	0.01%	1,611	22.31%	7,219
Champaign	33,700	57.43%	24,743	42.17%	97	0.17%	139	0.24%	8,957	15.26%	58,679
Christian	10,072	56.98%	7,556	42.75%	44	0.25%	3	0.02%	2,516	14.23%	17,675
Clark	5,706	65.74%	2,965	34.16%	8	0.09%	1	0.01%	2,741	31.58%	8,680
Clay	5,283	64.92%	2,844	34.95%	8	0.10%	3	0.04%	2,439	29.97%	8,138
Clinton	7,931	62.39%	4,756	37.41%	15	0.12%	10	0.08%	3,175	24.98%	12,712
Coles	13,681	62.90%	7,988	36.72%	15	0.07%	67	0.31%	5,693	26.18%	21,751
Cook	1,234,307	53.41%	1,063,268	46.01%	7,328	0.32%	6,134	0.27%	171,039	7.40%	2,311,037
Crawford	6,568	65.32%	3,477	34.58%	9	0.09%	1	0.01%	3,091	30.74%	10,055
Cumberland	3,257	60.79%	2,083	38.88%	9	0.17%	9	0.17%	1,174	21.91%	5,358
DeKalb	18,910	60.25%	12,375	39.43%	41	0.13%	58	0.18%	6,535	20.82%	31,384
DeWitt	5,025	65.22%	2,672	34.68%	7	0.09%	1	0.01%	2,353	30.54%	7,705
Douglas	5,840	68.66%	2,656	31.23%	8	0.09%	2	0.02%	3,184	37.43%	8,506
DuPage	172,341	75.02%	57,043	24.83%	297	0.13%	58	0.03%	115,298	50.19%	229,739
Edgar	7,195	64.73%	3,889	34.99%	29	0.26%	3	0.03%	3,306	29.74%	11,116
Edwards	3,017	73.93%	1,055	25.85%	9	0.22%	0	0.00%	1,962	48.08%	4,081
Effingham	8,752	66.34%	4,431	33.59%	7	0.05%	3	0.02%	4,321	32.75%	13,193
Fayette	6,574	61.05%	4,192	38.93%	1	0.01%	1	0.01%	2,382	22.12%	10,768
Ford	5,656	74.51%	1,934	25.48%	1	0.01%	0	0.00%	3,722	49.03%	7,591
Franklin	10,121	54.04%	8,545	45.62%	32	0.17%	31	0.17%	1,576	8.42%	18,729
Fulton	12,328	61.80%	7,529	37.74%	77	0.39%	15	0.08%	4,799	24.06%	19,949
Gallatin	2,148	53.69%	1,844	46.09%	6	0.15%	3	0.07%	304	7.60%	4,001
Greene	4,673	62.13%	2,824	37.55%	23	0.31%	1	0.01%	1,849	24.58%	7,521
Grundy	8,725	70.70%	3,584	29.04%	20	0.16%	12	0.10%	5,141	41.66%	12,341
Hamilton	3,282	61.94%	2,006	37.86%	9	0.17%	2	0.04%	1,276	24.08%	5,299
Hancock	7,519	67.56%	3,592	32.28%	16	0.14%	2	0.02%	3,927	35.28%	11,129
Hardin	1,915	62.54%	1,140	37.23%	6	0.20%	1	0.03%	775	25.31%	3,062
Henderson	2,689	60.62%	1,744	39.31%	2	0.05%	1	0.02%	945	21.31%	4,436
Henry	14,796	63.82%	8,368	36.09%	17	0.07%	4	0.02%	6,428	27.73%	23,185
Iroquois	11,995	76.00%	3,723	23.59%	12	0.08%	52	0.33%	8,272	52.41%	15,782
Jackson	12,393	48.42%	13,146	51.37%	48	0.19%	6	0.02%	-753	-2.95%	25,593
Jasper	3,461	61.18%	2,114	37.37%	8	0.14%	74	1.31%	1,347	23.81%	5,657
Jefferson	9,448	59.40%	6,396	40.21%	50	0.31%	11	0.07%	3,052	19.19%	15,905
Jersey	5,164	60.70%	3,317	38.99%	8	0.09%	18	0.21%	1,847	21.71%	8,507
Jo Daviess	5,763	63.34%	3,318	36.47%	13	0.14%	5	0.05%	2,445	26.87%	9,099
Johnson	2,826	68.54%	1,293	31.36%	4	0.10%	0	0.00%	1,533	37.18%	4,123
Kane	64,546	69.87%	27,525	29.80%	163	0.18%	143	0.15%	37,021	40.07%	92,377
Kankakee	26,866	66.54%	13,434	33.27%	54	0.13%	19	0.05%	13,432	33.27%	40,373
Kendall	9,373	78.65%	2,525	21.19%	19	0.16%	0	0.00%	6,848	57.46%	11,917
Knox	17,315	64.69%	9,333	34.87%	60	0.22%	58	0.22%	7,982	29.82%	26,766
Lake	92,052	65.84%	47,416	33.91%	278	0.20%	66	0.05%	44,636	31.93%	139,812
LaSalle	31,190	59.20%	21,405	40.63%	82	0.16%	10	0.02%	9,785	18.57%	52,687
Lawrence	5,347	65.36%	2,818	34.45%	15	0.18%	1	0.01%	2,529	30.91%	8,181
Lee	10,636	68.67%	4,788	30.91%	12	0.08%	53	0.34%	5,848	37.76%	15,489
Livingston	13,217	72.07%	5,110	27.86%	9	0.05%	3	0.02%	8,107	44.21%	18,339
Logan	10,277	69.95%	4,395	29.91%	18	0.12%	2	0.01%	5,882	40.04%	14,692
Macon	29,596	59.16%	20,296	40.57%	114	0.23%	23	0.05%	9,300	18.59%	50,029
Macoupin	13,583	58.03%	9,662	41.28%	147	0.63%	15	0.06%	3,921	16.75%	23,407
Madison	55,385	55.88%	43,289	43.68%	137	0.14%	305	0.31%	12,096	12.20%	99,116
Marion	10,755	60.58%	6,968	39.25%	21	0.12%	10	0.06%	3,787	21.33%	17,754
Marshall	4,452	67.43%	2,141	32.43%	8	0.12%	1	0.02%	2,311	35.00%	6,602
Mason	4,897	62.70%	2,901	37.14%	8	0.10%	4	0.05%	1,996	25.56%	7,810
Massac	4,313	69.99%	1,831	29.71%	14	0.23%	4	0.06%	2,482	40.28%	6,162
McDonough	10,573	67.18%	5,143	32.68%	17	0.11%	5	0.03%	5,430	34.50%	15,738
McHenry	36,114	74.75%	12,090	25.02%	88	0.18%	20	0.04%	24,024	49.73%	48,312
McLean	31,060	67.59%	14,824	32.26%	57	0.12%	14	0.03%	16,236	35.33%	45,955
Menard	3,657	69.49%	1,587	30.15%	8	0.15%	11	0.21%	2,070	39.34%	5,263
Mercer	5,452	60.98%	3,477	38.89%	8	0.09%	3	0.03%	1,975	22.09%	8,940
Monroe	6,479	68.44%	2,958	31.25%	24	0.25%	5	0.05%	3,521	37.19%	9,466
Montgomery	9,025	56.71%	6,858	43.10%	27	0.17%	3	0.02%	2,167	13.61%	15,913
Morgan	11,103	66.13%	5,674	33.80%	11	0.07%	1	0.01%	5,429	32.33%	16,789
Moultrie	3,143	57.07%	2,350	42.67%	9	0.16%	5	0.09%	793	14.40%	5,507
Ogle	13,512	73.88%	4,743	25.93%	32	0.17%	3	0.02%	8,769	47.95%	18,290
Peoria	50,324	64.49%	27,264	34.94%	112	0.14%	337	0.43%	23,060	29.55%	78,037
Perry	6,968	62.98%	4,084	36.91%	9	0.08%	3	0.03%	2,884	26.07%	11,064
Piatt	5,057	67.72%	2,394	32.06%	16	0.21%	1	0.01%	2,663	35.66%	7,468
Pike	5,940	60.23%	3,883	39.37%	38	0.39%	2	0.02%	2,057	20.86%	9,863
Pope	1,440	64.92%	773	34.85%	4	0.18%	1	0.05%	667	30.07%	2,218
Pulaski	2,485	59.27%	1,683	40.14%	21	0.50%	4	0.10%	802	19.13%	4,193
Putnam	1,665	59.74%	1,112	39.90%	4	0.14%	6	0.22%	553	19.84%	2,787
Randolph	9,761	60.20%	6,440	39.72%	14	0.09%	0	0.00%	3,321	20.48%	16,215
Richland	5,558	68.41%	2,553	31.42%	12	0.15%	2	0.02%	3,005	36.99%	8,125
Rock Island	37,548	53.39%	32,529	46.25%	227	0.32%	26	0.04%	5,019	7.14%	70,330
Saline	7,660	59.30%	5,226	40.46%	26	0.20%	6	0.05%	2,434	18.84%	12,918
Sangamon	50,458	65.46%	25,720	33.37%	284	0.37%	617	0.80%	24,738	32.09%	77,079
Schuyler	2,994	66.03%	1,534	33.83%	2	0.04%	4	0.09%	1,460	32.20%	4,534
Scott	2,228	66.00%	1,145	33.92%	2	0.06%	1	0.03%	1,083	32.08%	3,376
Shelby	7,217	62.08%	4,389	37.75%	17	0.15%	3	0.03%	2,828	24.33%	11,626
St. Clair	50,519	51.50%	46,636	47.54%	876	0.89%	66	0.07%	3,883	3.96%	98,097
Stark	2,529	71.44%	993	28.05%	8	0.23%	10	0.28%	1,536	43.39%	3,540
Stephenson	13,584	67.86%	6,404	31.99%	24	0.12%	7	0.03%	7,180	35.87%	20,019
Tazewell	31,937	67.08%	15,576	32.71%	83	0.17%	17	0.04%	16,361	34.37%	47,613
Union	5,034	59.36%	3,428	40.42%	16	0.19%	2	0.02%	1,606	18.94%	8,480
Vermilion	24,863	63.06%	14,413	36.56%	70	0.18%	79	0.20%	10,450	26.50%	39,425
Wabash	4,310	68.35%	1,985	31.48%	5	0.08%	6	0.10%	2,325	36.87%	6,306
Warren	7,021	70.15%	2,969	29.67%	15	0.15%	3	0.03%	4,052	40.48%	10,008
Washington	5,179	68.85%	2,327	30.94%	12	0.16%	4	0.05%	2,852	37.91%	7,522
Wayne	6,400	69.75%	2,763	30.11%	10	0.11%	2	0.02%	3,637	39.64%	9,175
White	6,052	62.10%	3,678	37.74%	11	0.11%	5	0.05%	2,374	24.36%	9,746
Whiteside	17,305	68.40%	7,909	31.26%	80	0.32%	7	0.03%	9,396	37.14%	25,301
Will	65,155	65.67%	33,633	33.90%	185	0.19%	245	0.25%	31,522	31.77%	99,218
Williamson	14,101	60.02%	9,202	39.17%	12	0.05%	177	0.75%	4,899	20.85%	23,492
Winnebago	57,682	61.46%	35,937	38.29%	179	0.19%	52	0.06%	21,745	23.17%	93,850
Woodford	9,622	72.85%	3,558	26.94%	18	0.14%	10	0.08%	6,064	45.91%	13,208
Totals	2,788,179	59.03%	1,913,472	40.51%	12,344	0.26%	9,241	0.20%	874,707	18.52%	4,723,236

==== Counties that flipped from Democratic to Republican ====
- Alexander
- Christian
- Cook
- Franklin
- Fulton
- Gallatin
- Macon
- Macoupin
- Madison
- Pulaski
- Rock Island
- St. Clair

==== Counties that flipped from Republican to Democratic ====
- Jackson

==== Analysis ====
Nixon's 2,788,179 votes were the most received by a Republican presidential candidate in the state's history.

This was the closest anyone has come to sweeping every Illinois county, making the state along with Kentucky and North Carolina, the only states where no one candidate has ever swept every county in the state's history.

== See also ==
- United States presidential elections in Illinois
