= 1938 United States House of Representatives elections in California =

Democratic gain Republican gain Democratic hold Republican hold

The United States House of Representatives elections in California, 1938 was an election for California's delegation to the United States House of Representatives, which occurred as part of the general election of the House of Representatives on November 8, 1938. Republicans gained four districts. Franck R. Havenner, first elected to Congress as a Progressive, was elected for the rest of his House career as a Democrat.

== Overview ==
United States House of Representatives elections in California, 1938
Party	Votes	Percentage	Seats	+/–
Democratic	1,137,635	47.7%	12	-3
Republican	1,112,209	46.6%	8	+4
Townsend	88,851	3.7%	0	0
Communist	26,228	1.1%	0	0
Progressive	17,622	0.7%	0	-1
Independent	3,863	0.2%	0	0
Totals	2,386,408	100.0%	20	—

== Delegation composition ==
1938 pre-election	Seats
Democratic-Held	15
Republican-Held	4
Progressive-Held	1

1938 post-election	Seats
Democratic-Held	12
Republican-Held	8

== Results ==
Final results from the Clerk of the House of Representatives:

=== District 1 ===
California's 1st congressional district election, 1938
Party	Candidate	Votes	%
Democratic	Clarence F. Lea (incumbent)	73,636	63
Townsend	Ernest S. Mitchell	43,320	37
Total votes		116,956	100
Turnout			
Democratic hold			

=== District 2 ===
California's 2nd congressional district election, 1938
Party	Candidate	Votes	%
Republican	Harry Lane Englebright (incumbent)	71,496	100.0
Turnout			
Republican hold			

=== District 3 ===
California's 3rd congressional district election, 1938
Party	Candidate	Votes	%
Democratic	Frank H. Buck (incumbent)	119,236	93.3
Communist	Nora Conklin	8,271	6.5
Independent	Walter Schaefer (write-in)	327	0.2
Total votes		127,834	100.0
Turnout			
Democratic hold			

=== District 4 ===
California's 4th congressional district election, 1938
Party	Candidate	Votes	%
Democratic	Franck R. Havenner (incumbent)	64,452	61.2
Republican	Kennett B. Dawson	40,842	38.8
Total votes		105,294	100.0
Turnout			
Democratic gain from Progressive Party (United States, 1924)			

=== District 5 ===
California's 5th congressional district election, 1938
Party	Candidate	Votes	%
Republican	Richard J. Welch (incumbent)	91,868	100.0
Turnout			
Republican hold			

=== District 6 ===
California's 6th congressional district election, 1938
Party	Candidate	Votes	%
Republican	Albert E. Carter (incumbent)	118,632	94.4
Communist	Dave L. Saunders	7,015	5.6
Total votes		125,647	100.0
Turnout			
Republican hold			

=== District 7 ===
California's 7th congressional district election, 1938
Party	Candidate	Votes	%
Democratic	John H. Tolan (incumbent)	62,599	55.3
Republican	Charles W. Fisher	50,504	44.7
Total votes		113,103	100.0
Turnout			
Democratic hold			

=== District 8 ===
California's 8th congressional district election, 1938
Party	Candidate	Votes	%
Republican	Jack Z. Anderson	84,084	55
Democratic	John J. McGrath (incumbent)	68,681	45
Total votes		152,765	100
Turnout			
Republican gain from Democratic			

=== District 9 ===
California's 9th congressional district election, 1938
Party	Candidate	Votes	%
Republican	Bertrand W. Gearhart (incumbent)	91,128	96.3
Independent	George H. Sciaroni (write-in)	3,536	3.7
Total votes		94,664	100.0
Turnout			
Republican hold			

=== District 10 ===
California's 10th congressional district election, 1938
Party	Candidate	Votes	%
Democratic	Alfred J. Elliott (incumbent)	84,791	67.3
Republican	F. Fred Hoelscher	41,194	32.7
Total votes		125,985	100.0
Turnout			
Democratic hold			

=== District 11 ===
California's 11th congressional district election, 1938
Party	Candidate	Votes	%
Republican	John Carl Hinshaw	68,712	47.0
Democratic	Carl Stuart Hamblen	59,993	41.1
Townsend	Ralph D. Horton	12,713	8.7
Progressive Party (United States, 1924)	John R. Grey	3,821	2.6
Communist	Orla E. Lair	817	0.6
Total votes		146,056	100.0
Turnout			
Republican gain from Democratic			

=== District 12 ===
California's 12th congressional district election, 1938
Party	Candidate	Votes	%
Democratic	Jerry Voorhis (incumbent)	75,003	60.8
Republican	Eugene W. Nixon	40,457	32.8
Townsend	Russell R. Hand	7,903	6.4
Total votes		123,363	100.0
Turnout			
Democratic hold			

=== District 13 ===
California's 13th congressional district election, 1938
Party	Candidate	Votes	%
Democratic	Charles Kramer (incumbent)	96,258	65.9
Republican	K. L. Stockton	44,808	30.7
Communist	Louis Baron	5,104	3.4
Total votes		146,170	100.0
Turnout			
Democratic hold			

=== District 14 ===
California's 14th congressional district election, 1938
Party	Candidate	Votes	%
Democratic	Thomas F. Ford (incumbent)	67,588	68.3
Republican	William D. Campbell	31,375	31.7
Total votes		98,963	100.0
Turnout			
Democratic hold			

=== District 15 ===
California's 15th congressional district election, 1938
Party	Candidate	Votes	%
Democratic	John M. Costello (incumbent)	83,086	60.4
Republican	O. D. Thomas	51,483	37.4
Communist	Emil Freed	2,951	2.2
Total votes		137,520	100.0
Turnout			
Democratic hold			

=== District 16 ===
California's 16th congressional district election, 1938
Party	Candidate	Votes	%
Republican	Leland M. Ford	97,407	62.8
Democratic	John F. Dockweiler (write-in)	32,863	21.2
Townsend	Ted E. Felt	16,045	10.3
Progressive Party (United States, 1924)	J. Barton Huthins	6,643	4.3
Communist	La Rue McCormick	2,070	1.3
Total votes		155,028	100.0
Turnout			
Republican gain from Democratic			

=== District 17 ===
California's 17th congressional district election, 1938
Party	Candidate	Votes	%
Democratic	Lee E. Geyer (incumbent)	56,513	58.8
Republican	Clifton A. Hix	26,891	28.0
Townsend	Fred C. Wagner	8,870	9.2
Progressive Party (United States, 1924)	Robert O. Bates	3,774	3.9
Total votes		96,048	100.0
Turnout			
Democratic hold			

=== District 18 ===
California's 18th congressional district election, 1938
Party	Candidate	Votes	%
Republican	Thomas M. Eaton	52,216	48.6
Democratic	Byron N. Scott (incumbent)	51,874	48.3
Progressive Party (United States, 1924)	Solomon Carr	3,384	3.1
Total votes		107,474	100.0
Turnout			
Republican gain from Democratic			

=== District 19 ===
California's 19th congressional district election, 1938
Party	Candidate	Votes	%
Democratic	Harry R. Sheppard (incumbent)	75,819	53.3
Republican	C. T. Johnson	66,402	46.7
Total votes		142,221	100.0
Turnout			
Democratic hold			

=== District 20 ===
California's 20th congressional district election, 1938
Party	Candidate	Votes	%
Democratic	Edouard Izac (incumbent)	65,243	60.4
Republican	John L. Bacon	42,710	39.6
Total votes		107,953	100.0
Turnout			
Democratic hold			

== See also ==
- 76th United States Congress
- Political party strength in California
- Political party strength in U.S. states
- 1938 United States House of Representatives elections
