= 1982 United States Senate election in Ohio =

- November 2, 1982
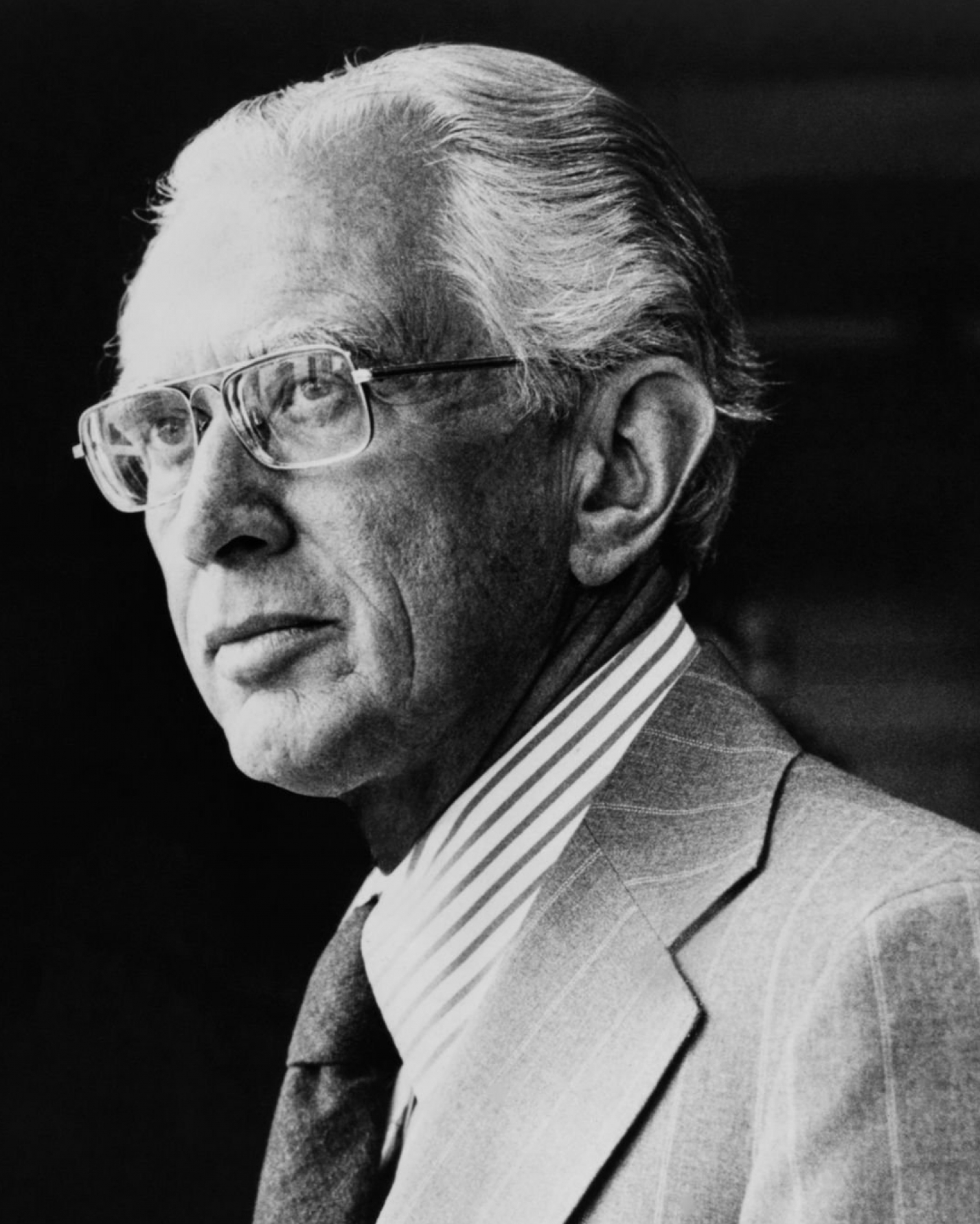

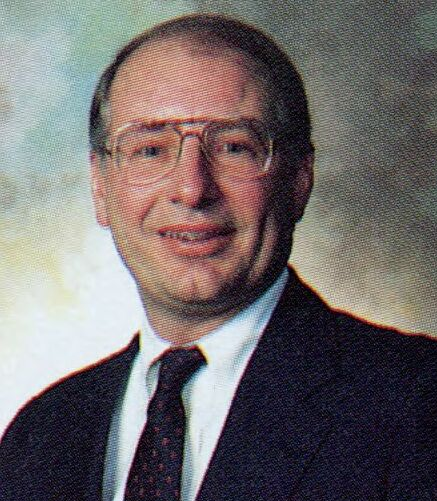
| Nominee | Howard Metzenbaum | Paul Pfeifer |
| Party | Democratic | Republican |
| Popular vote | 1,923,767 | 1,396,790 |
| Percentage | 56.66% | 41.14% |
- County results Metzenbaum: 40–50% 50–60% 60–70% 70–80% Pfeifer: 40–50% 50–60% 60–70%
U.S. senator before election
Howard Metzenbaum
Democratic
Elected U.S. Senator
Howard Metzenbaum
Democratic

The 1982 United States Senate election in Ohio took place on November 2, 1982. Incumbent Democratic U.S. Senator Howard Metzenbaum was re-elected to a second term in office, defeating Republican State Senator Paul Pfeifer. Along with the gubernatorial election that same year, this election is the last time Butler County voted Democratic in a statewide election.

== Democratic primary ==
=== Candidates ===
- Norbert G. Dennerll, former Cleveland City Councilman
- Howard Metzenbaum, incumbent Senator

=== Results ===
Democratic primary results
| Party | Candidate | Votes | % |
|---|---|---|---|
| Democratic | Howard Metzenbaum (incumbent) | 801,785 | 82.70% |
| Democratic | Norbert G. Dennerll Jr. | 167,778 | 17.30% |
| Total votes | | 969,563 | 100.00% |

== Republican primary ==
=== Candidates ===
- John Ashbrook, U.S. Representative from Newark (died April 24)
- Walter E. Beckjord, director of Hospice of Cincinnati
- Richard H. Englefield (write-in)
- Paul Pfeifer, State Senator from Bucyrus
- Bill Ress, State Senator from New Philadelphia (write-in)

=== Campaign ===
Most polls showed U.S. Representative John Ashbrook winning the primary with a plurality, but he died on April 24 from a gastric hemorrhage.

Ashbrook supporter and State Senator Bill Ress launched a write-in campaign with the endorsement of Jean Spencer Ashbrook, the Representative's widow.

=== Results ===
Republican primary results
| Party | Candidate | Votes | % |
|---|---|---|---|
| Republican | Paul Pfeifer | 364,579 | 60.03% |
| Republican | Walter E. Beckjord | 180,198 | 29.67% |
| Republican | Bill Ress (write-in) | 62,446 | 10.28% |
| Republican | Richard H. Englefield | 106 | 0.02% |
| Total votes | | 607,329 | 100.00% |

== General election ==
=== Results ===
1982 United States Senate election in Ohio
| Party | Candidate | Votes | % | ±% |
|---|---|---|---|---|
| Democratic | Howard Metzenbaum (incumbent) | 1,923,767 | 56.66% | ▲7.15 |
| Republican | Paul Pfeifer | 1,396,790 | 41.14% | ▼5.48 |
| Independent | Alicia Merel | 38,803 | 1.14% | N/A |
| Libertarian | Philip Herzing | 36,103 | 1.06% | N/A |
| Independent | Fay Treffert Ellis (write-in) | 35 | 0.00% | N/A |
| Total votes | | 3,395,498 | 100.00% | |
| Democratic hold | | Swing | | |

== See also ==
- 1982 United States Senate elections
