= Cecil F. White =

American politician

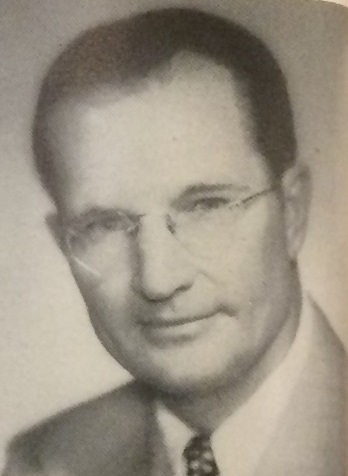
- White, c. 1949

Member of the U.S. House of Representatives from California's 9th district
- In office January 3, 1949 – January 3, 1951
- Preceded by: Bertrand W. Gearhart
- Succeeded by: Allan O. Hunter

Personal details
- Born: Cecil Fielding White; December 12, 1900 Temple, Texas, U.S.
- Died: March 29, 1992 (aged 91) San Francisco, California, U.S.
- Party: Democratic
- Spouse: Mildred Willis
- Children: 4
- Parents: James Bernard White (father); Massie Bedford (mother)
- Occupation: Rancher; politician

Military service
- Allegiance: United States
- Branch: United States Army
- Years of service: 1916–1919
- Rank: sergeant
- Conflict: Mexican Expedition; World War I

Cecil Fielding White (December 12, 1900 – March 29, 1992) was an American farmer, World War I veteran, and politician. As a Democrat, White served as the U.S. representative for California's 9th congressional district for one term, from 1949 to 1951. White was a cotton broker and owned his own ranch before getting into politics at the age of 47, and defeating seven-term incumbent Republican Bertrand W. Gearhart.

== Background ==
White was born in Temple, Texas, on December 12, 1900, the son of James Bernard and Massie (née Bedford) White. His family moved to Fort Smith, Arkansas, where White grew up and went through the city's public schooling system.

=== Military service ===
At the age of sixteen, he joined the Arkansas Army National Guard and served on the border with Mexico during the Pancho Villa Expedition.

During World War I, White fought in France as a sergeant in the 142nd Field Artillery Regiment, After the war, White worked in the Los Angeles office of a cotton broker and later worked with cotton mills in Arkansas, California and Tennessee. After going back to California, he became the owner and operator of his own ranch, under his name in Devils Den, California.

=== Family ===
He married Mildred Willis, and they had four children: Millicent, Donald, Douglas, and Bertram.

== Politics ==
As a 47-year-old cotton rancher, White ran for the United States House of Representatives seat in California's 9th congressional district. He faced seven-term Republican incumbent Bertrand W. Gearhart in the election. Gearhart had faced one Democratic challenger in his six previous re-election bids. White defeated Gearhart after capturing a 51.3% majority with a margin of victory of more than 6,000 votes. White was challenged in 1950 by Republican Allan O. Hunter. Hunter defeated White, 52.0% to 48%. After leaving Congress White returned to his cotton growing business.

White again ran for a seat in the House of Representatives in 1966, this time as the Republican nominee for California's 16th congressional district. Democratic incumbent Bernice F. Sisk defeated White in a lopsided 71.3%–28.6% election.

== Death ==
White remained a resident of San Francisco, California, until his death on March 29, 1992. His remains were cremated.

== Electoral history ==
United States House of Representatives elections, 1948
Party	Candidate	Votes	%
Democratic	Cecil F. White	72,826	51.3
Republican	Bertrand W. Gearhart (Incumbent)	66,563	46.9
Progressive	Josephine F. Daniels	2,573	1.8
Total votes		141,962	100.0
Turnout			
Democratic gain from Republican			

United States House of Representatives elections, 1950
Party	Candidate	Votes	%
Republican	Allan O. Hunter	76,015	52
Democratic	Cecil F. White (incumbent)	70,201	48
Total votes		146,216	100.0
Turnout			
Republican gain from Democratic			

1966 United States House of Representatives elections in California
Party	Candidate	Votes	%
Democratic	Bernice F. Sisk (incumbent)	118,063	71.4
Republican	Cecil F. White	47,329	28.6
Total votes		165,392	100.0
Turnout			
Democratic hold			

U.S. House of Representatives
Preceded by Bertrand W. Gearhart	Member of the U.S. House of Representatives from California's 9th congressional district 1949–1951	Succeeded by Allan O. Hunter
