= Allan O. Hunter =

American lawyer and politician

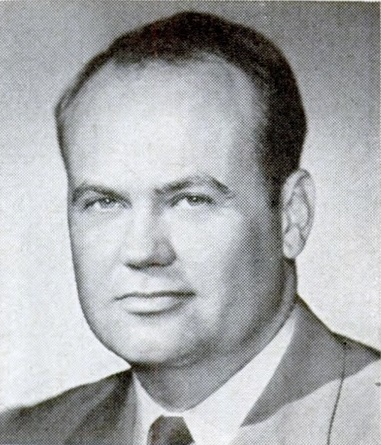

Member of the U.S. House of Representatives from California's 12th district
- In office January 3, 1951 – January 3, 1955
- Preceded by: Cecil F. White
- Succeeded by: Bernice F. Sisk
- Constituency: 9th district (1951–1953); 12th district (1953–1955)

Personal details
- Born: June 15, 1916 Los Angeles, California
- Died: May 2, 1995 (aged 78) Bethesda, Maryland
- Party: Republican
- Spouse: Dixie Lee Hunter

Allan Oakley Hunter (June 15, 1916 – May 2, 1995) was an American lawyer and politician. Hunter, a Republican, served as the United States representative for California's 9th congressional district from 1951 to 1953 and for California's 12th congressional district from 1953 to 1955.

After his stint in elective office, Hunter served as the president and chairman of the Federal National Mortgage Association (commonly known as Fannie Mae) from 1970 to 1981.

== Early life and education ==
Hunter was born on June 15, 1916, in Los Angeles, California. After attending public school in Fresno, California, he went on to Fresno State College. After graduating from the college in 1937, Hunter attended the University of California, Hastings College of the Law and graduated from there with a Bachelor of Laws degree in 1940.

== Early career ==
After being admitted to the bar the same year, he became a special agent for the Federal Bureau of Investigation until 1944.

=== World War II ===
He then served in the United States Naval Reserve Office of Strategic Services in England and Germany with a special counterintelligence unit (SCU) under the Sixth Army Group from 1944 to 1946.

=== Legal practice ===
After returning from World War II, Hunter started his law practice in Fresno, and continued until 1950 when he decided to run for the House of Representatives seat of the 9th congressional district.

== Congress ==
In the 9th district, the Republican Hunter defeated Democratic incumbent Cecil F. White in a close race, capturing 76,015 votes to White's 70,201 votes, giving Hunter the 52%-48% margin.

In 1952, Hunter was a delegate from California in the Republican National Convention. In that year's House election, Hunter ran unopposed for the seat in the state's 12th congressional district and won the election after capturing 99.3% of the vote.

In the 1954 House election, Hunter faced a tough re-election against political newcomer Democrat Bernice F. Sisk. Sisk defeated Hunter in the election with a 53.8%-46.2% majority.

== Career after Congress ==
After losing his re-election bid, he became the general counsel with the Housing and Home Finance Agency in Washington, D.C., the following year. He served in that position until July 1957 when he resigned in order to continue his law practice in Fresno.

Three years later, he was again a delegate to the 1960 Republican National Convention in Chicago, Illinois.

For the next ten years, he collaborated on the development and operation of the Rossmoor Leisure World Communities in California. From 1966 to 1969, Hunter served as chairman of California's state commission of housing and community development.

=== Fannie Mae ===
In January 1970, Hunter was chosen by then-President Richard Nixon to become the chairman of the Federal National Mortgage Association, the nation's largest provider of housing finance. In 1978, tension started to rise between Hunter and Secretary of Housing and Urban Development Patricia Roberts Harris. Harris specifically felt that the organization was too concerned about making money and "too unconcerned with stimulating mortgage lending for low-income housing in the cities." Hunter's resignation was being called for by the Carter White House and by the directors of the company's board. In November 1977, a vote for Hunter's resignation failed by an 8–6 margin.

=== Retirement ===
Hunter was eventually replaced by David O. Maxwell as Fannie Mae's chairman and president in 1981. After Maxwell left a $7.56 million yearly salary with Fannie Mae and retired with a $19.6 million pension, Hunter said, "Executive compensation at Fannie Mae has run amok." Hunter himself retired with a $80,000 pension in 1981, and said that he believed that the CEOs of government-backed corporations shouldn't make the million-dollar salaries found in the private sector. Hunter also said in an interview, "I don't think it's justified by any rational standard."

== Death ==
Hunter died on May 2, 1995, in a hospital in Bethesda, Maryland, after a heart attack.

== Electoral history ==
United States House of Representatives elections, 1950
Party	Candidate	Votes	%
Republican	Allan O. Hunter	76,015	52
Democratic	Cecil F. White (incumbent)	70,201	48
Total votes		146,216	100.0
Turnout			
Republican gain from Democratic			

1952 United States House of Representatives elections
Party	Candidate	Votes	%
Republican	Allan O. Hunter (Incumbent)	103,587	100.0%
Turnout			
Republican hold			

1954 United States House of Representatives elections
Party	Candidate	Votes	%
Democratic	B. F. Sisk	63,911	53.8%
Republican	Allan O. Hunter (Incumbent)	54,903	46.2%
Total votes		118,814	100.0%
Turnout			
Democratic gain from Republican			

U.S. House of Representatives
Preceded by Cecil F. White	Member of the U.S. House of Representatives from California's 9th congressional district 1951–1953	Succeeded by J. Arthur Younger
Preceded by Patrick J. Hillings	Member of the U.S. House of Representatives from California's 12th congressional district 1953–1955	Succeeded by Bernice F. Sisk
