= California's 12th congressional district =

U.S. House district for California

Coordinates: 37.77°N 122.42°W

- Interactive map of district boundaries since 2023, starting with the 2022 elections (Note: The district includes the same census blocks as drawn by the Citizens Redistricting Commission in 2021 and during mid-decade redistricting as passed in Prop 50 (2025), with the exception of the loss of an unpopulated sliver of Alameda Island within San Francisco. As such, boundaries of the district will not change at the 2026 elections.)
- Representative: Lateefah Simon; D–Emeryville
- Distribution: 100.0% urban; 0.0% rural
- Population (2025): 745,716
- Median household income: $102,639
- Ethnicity: 32.9% White; 23.6% Hispanic; 20.6% Asian; 15.3% Black; 6.2% Two or more races; 1.5% other
- Cook PVI: D+39

California's 12th congressional district is a congressional district in northern California. Lateefah Simon, a Democrat, has represented the district since January 2025. The district was represented previously by longtime congresswoman Barbara Lee, former Speaker of the House of Representatives Nancy Pelosi (who has since been redistricted to the 11th district), and former president of the United States Richard Nixon.

Currently, the 12th district is located in Alameda County and encompasses the cities of Oakland, Berkeley, Emeryville, Alameda, Albany, Piedmont, and most of San Leandro. With a Cook Partisan Voter Index rating of D+39, the 12th district is the most Democratic district in California, giving nearly 85% of its vote to Kamala Harris in the 2024 presidential election.

Before redistricting in 2023, the 12th district was within San Francisco, encompassing most of the city. The remainder of the city was included in the 14th district.

== History ==
When the district was created after the 1930 census, it was located in Los Angeles County. As California's population grew, however, the district generally was moved northward, eventually to the San Francisco peninsula.

Richard Nixon, who would subsequently serve as the 37th president of the United States, represented this district from 1947 to 1951, when it was located to the east of Los Angeles. Nancy Pelosi, the former speaker of the House, represented the district from 2013 to 2023, when it covered most of San Francisco. She had previously served California's 5th congressional district from 1987 to 1993 and California's 8th congressional district from 1993 to 2013 and currently represents California's 11th congressional district.

== Recent election results from statewide races ==
=== 2023–2033 boundaries ===
Year	Office	Results
2008	President	Obama 90–10%
2010	Governor	Brown 86–11%
2010	Lt. Governor	Newsom 81–13%
2010	Secretary of State	Bowen 82–10%
2010	Attorney General	Harris 78–15%
2010	Treasurer	Lockyer 83–9%
2010	Controller	Chiang 83–9%
2012	President	Obama 91–9%
2014	Governor	Brown 92–8%
2016	President	Clinton 88–6%
2018	Governor	Newsom 91–9%
2018	Attorney General	Becerra 91–9%
2020	President	Biden 89–9%
2022	Senate (Reg.)	Padilla 91–9%
2022	Governor	Newsom 90–10%
2022	Lt. Governor	Kounalakis 90–10%
2022	Secretary of State	Weber 90–10%
2022	Attorney General	Bonta 89–11%
2022	Treasurer	Ma 89–11%
2022	Controller	Cohen 84–16%
2024	President	Harris 85–11%
2024	Senate (Reg.)	Schiff 88–12%

== Composition ==
FIPS County Code	County	Seat	Population
1	Alameda	Oakland	1,622,188

Due to the 2020 redistricting, California's 12th district has effectively been shifted to the former geography of the 13th district. It encompasses the coastal section of Alameda County, and is anchored by Oakland. The district also includes the cities of Alameda, Albany, Berkeley, Emeryville, Piedmont, and San Leandro. Technically, the westernmost tip of Alameda Island is part of the City and County of San Francisco, but it is uninhabited.

This district borders the 13th district, and Alameda County is partitioned between them by Grant Ave, Union Pacific, Lewelling Blvd, Wicks Blvd, Manor Blvd, Juniper St, Dayton Ave, Padre Ave, Fargo Ave, Edgemoor St, Trojan Ave, Beatty St, Fleming St, Highway 880, Floresta Blvd, Halcyon Dr, Hesperian Blvd, Thornally Dr, Highway 185, 150th Ave, Highway 580, Benedict Dr, San Leandro Creek, and Lake Chabot Regional Park.

=== Cities ===
- Oakland – 440,646
- Berkeley – 124,321
- San Leandro – 91,008
- Alameda – 78,280
- Albany – 20,271
- Emeryville – 12,905
- Piedmont – 11,270

== List of members representing the district ==
Representative	Party	Dates	Cong ress(es)	Electoral history	Counties
District created March 4, 1933
John H. Hoeppel (Arcadia)	Democratic	March 4, 1933 – January 3, 1937	73rd 74th	Elected in 1932. Re-elected in 1934. Lost renomination.	1933–1953: Eastern Los Angeles (Pasadena, Pomona, Whittier)
Jerry Voorhis (San Dimas)	Democratic	January 3, 1937 – January 3, 1947	75th 76th 77th 78th 79th	Elected in 1936. Re-elected in 1938. Re-elected in 1940. Re-elected in 1942. Re-elected in 1944. Lost re-election.	1933–1953: Eastern Los Angeles (Pasadena, Pomona, Whittier)
Richard Nixon (Whittier)	Republican	January 3, 1947 – November 30, 1950	80th 81st	Elected in 1946. Re-elected in 1948. Retired to run for U.S. Senator. Resigned when appointed U.S. Senator.	1933–1953: Eastern Los Angeles (Pasadena, Pomona, Whittier)
Vacant		November 30, 1950 – January 3, 1951	81st		1933–1953: Eastern Los Angeles (Pasadena, Pomona, Whittier)
Patrick J. Hillings (Arcadia)	Republican	January 3, 1951 – January 3, 1953	82nd	Elected in 1950. Redistricted to the 25th district.	1933–1953: Eastern Los Angeles (Pasadena, Pomona, Whittier)
Allan O. Hunter (Fresno)	Republican	January 3, 1953 – January 3, 1955	83rd	Redistricted from the 9th district and re-elected in 1952. Lost re-election.	1953–1963: Fresno, Madera, Merced
B. F. Sisk (Fresno)	Democratic	January 3, 1955 – January 3, 1963	84th 85th 86th 87th	Elected in 1954. Re-elected in 1956. Redistricted to the 16th district.	1953–1963: Fresno, Madera, Merced
Burt Talcott (Salinas)	Republican	January 3, 1963 – January 3, 1975	88th 89th 90th 91st 92nd 93rd	Elected in 1962. Re-elected in 1964. Re-elected in 1966. Re-elected in 1968. Re-elected in 1970. Re-elected in 1972. Redistricted to the 16th district.	1963–1967: Monterey, San Benito, San Luis Obispo, Santa Cruz
Burt Talcott (Salinas)	Republican	January 3, 1963 – January 3, 1975	88th 89th 90th 91st 92nd 93rd	Elected in 1962. Re-elected in 1964. Re-elected in 1966. Re-elected in 1968. Re-elected in 1970. Re-elected in 1972. Redistricted to the 16th district.	1967–1973: Kings, Monterey, San Luis Obispo, Santa Cruz
Burt Talcott (Salinas)	Republican	January 3, 1963 – January 3, 1975	88th 89th 90th 91st 92nd 93rd	Elected in 1962. Re-elected in 1964. Re-elected in 1966. Re-elected in 1968. Re-elected in 1970. Re-elected in 1972. Redistricted to the 16th district.	1973–1975: Monterey, San Benito, northwestern San Luis Obispo, southern Santa Clara, Santa Cruz
Pete McCloskey (Menlo Park)	Republican	January 3, 1975 – January 3, 1983	94th 95th 96th 97th	Redistricted from the 17th district and re-elected in 1974. Re-elected in 1976. Re-elected in 1978. Re-elected in 1980. Retired to run for U.S. Senator.	1975–1983: Southern San Mateo, northern Santa Clara
Ed Zschau (Los Altos)	Republican	January 3, 1983 – January 3, 1987	98th 99th	Elected in 1982. Re-elected in 1984. Retired to run for U.S. Senator.	1983–1993: Southern San Mateo, Santa Clara, northern Santa Cruz
Ernie Konnyu (Saratoga)	Republican	January 3, 1987 – January 3, 1989	100th	Elected in 1986. Lost renomination.	1983–1993: Southern San Mateo, Santa Clara, northern Santa Cruz
Tom Campbell (Stanford)	Republican	January 3, 1989 – January 3, 1993	101st 102nd	Elected in 1988. Re-elected in 1990. Retired to run for U.S. Senator.	1983–1993: Southern San Mateo, Santa Clara, northern Santa Cruz
Tom Lantos (San Mateo)	Democratic	January 3, 1993 – February 11, 2008	103rd 104th 105th 106th 107th 108th 109th 110th	Redistricted from the 11th district and re-elected in 1992. Re-elected in 1994. Re-elected in 1996. Re-elected in 1998. Re-elected in 2000. Re-elected in 2002. Re-elected in 2004. Re-elected in 2006. Announced retirement, then died.	1993–2003: Southwestern San Francisco, northern San Mateo
Tom Lantos (San Mateo)	Democratic	January 3, 1993 – February 11, 2008	103rd 104th 105th 106th 107th 108th 109th 110th	Redistricted from the 11th district and re-elected in 1992. Re-elected in 1994. Re-elected in 1996. Re-elected in 1998. Re-elected in 2000. Re-elected in 2002. Re-elected in 2004. Re-elected in 2006. Announced retirement, then died.	2003–2013: Southwestern San Francisco, northern San Mateo
Vacant		February 11, 2008 – April 8, 2008	110th		2003–2013: Southwestern San Francisco, northern San Mateo
Jackie Speier (Hillsborough)	Democratic	April 8, 2008 – January 3, 2013	110th 111th 112th	Elected to finish Lantos's term. Re-elected in 2008. Re-elected in 2010. Redistricted to the 14th district.	2003–2013: Southwestern San Francisco, northern San Mateo
Nancy Pelosi (San Francisco)	Democratic	January 3, 2013 – January 3, 2023	113th 114th 115th 116th 117th	Redistricted from the 8th district and re-elected in 2012. Re-elected in 2014. Re-elected in 2016. Re-elected in 2018. Re-elected in 2020. Redistricted to the 11th district.	2013–2023: Most of San Francisco
Barbara Lee (Oakland)	Democratic	January 3, 2023 – January 3, 2025	118th	Redistricted from the 13th district and re-elected in 2022. Retired to run for U.S. senator.	2023–present northwestern portion of Alameda County
Lateefah Simon (Emeryville)	Democratic	January 3, 2025 – present	119th	Elected in 2024. Re-elected in 2026.	2023–present northwestern portion of Alameda County

== Election results ==
=== 1932 ===
1932 United States House of Representatives elections
Party	Candidate	Votes	%
Democratic	John H. Hoeppel	43,122	45.8%
Republican	Frederick F. Houser	40,674	43.2%
Prohibition	Richard M. Cannon	10,308	11.0%
Total votes		94,104	100.0%
Turnout			
Democratic win (new seat)			

=== 1934 ===
1934 United States House of Representatives elections
Party	Candidate	Votes	%
Democratic	John H. Hoeppel (incumbent)	52,595	50.7%
Republican	Frederick F. Houser	51,216	49.3%
Total votes		103,811	100.0%
Turnout			
Democratic hold			

=== 1936 ===
1936 United States House of Representatives elections
Party	Candidate	Votes	%
Democratic	Jerry Voorhis	62,034	53.7%
Republican	Frederick F. Houser	53,445	46.3%
Total votes		115,479	100.0%
Turnout			
Democratic hold			

=== 1938 ===
1938 United States House of Representatives elections
Party	Candidate	Votes	%
Democratic	Jerry Voorhis (incumbent)	75,003	60.8%
Republican	Eugene W. Nixon	40,457	32.8%
Townsend	Russell R. Hand	7,903	6.4%
Total votes		123,363	100.0%
Turnout			
Democratic hold			

=== 1940 ===
1940 United States House of Representatives elections
Party	Candidate	Votes	%
Democratic	Jerry Voorhis (incumbent)	99,494	64.0%
Republican	Eugene W. Nixon	54,731	35.2%
Communist	Albert Lewis	1,152	0.8%
Total votes		155,377	100.0%
Turnout			
Democratic hold			

=== 1942 ===
1942 United States House of Representatives elections
Party	Candidate	Votes	%
Democratic	Jerry Voorhis (incumbent)	53,705	56.8%
Republican	Robert P. Shuler	40,780	43.2%
Total votes		94,485	100.0%
Turnout			
Democratic hold			

=== 1944 ===
1944 United States House of Representatives elections
Party	Candidate	Votes	%
Democratic	Jerry Voorhis (incumbent)	77,385	55.3%
Republican	Roy P. McLaughlin	62,524	44.7%
Total votes		139,909	100.0%
Turnout			
Democratic hold			

=== 1946 ===
1946 United States House of Representatives elections
Party	Candidate	Votes	%
Republican	Richard Nixon	65,586	56.0%
Democratic	Jerry Voorhis (incumbent)	49,994	42.7%
Prohibition	John Henry Hoeppel	1,476	1.3%
Total votes		117,056	100.0%
Turnout			
Republican gain from Democratic			

=== 1948 ===
1948 United States House of Representatives elections
Party	Candidate	Votes	%
Republican	Richard Nixon (incumbent)	141,509	87.8%
Progressive	Una W. Rice	19,631	12.2%
Total votes		161,140	100.0%
Turnout			
Republican hold			

=== 1950 ===
1950 United States House of Representatives elections
Party	Candidate	Votes	%
Republican	Patrick J. Hillings	107,933	60.1%
Democratic	Steve Zetterberg	71,682	39.9%
Total votes		179,615	100.0%
Turnout			
Republican hold			

=== 1952 ===
1952 United States House of Representatives elections
Party	Candidate	Votes	%
Republican	Allan O. Hunter (incumbent)	103,587	100.0%
Turnout			
Republican hold			

=== 1954 ===
1954 United States House of Representatives elections
Party	Candidate	Votes	%
Democratic	B. F. Sisk	63,911	53.8%
Republican	Allan O. Hunter (incumbent)	54,903	46.2%
Total votes		118,814	100.0%
Turnout			
Democratic gain from Republican			

=== 1956 ===
1956 United States House of Representatives elections
Party	Candidate	Votes	%
Democratic	B. F. Sisk (incumbent)	109,920	73%
Republican	Robert B. Moore	40,663	27%
Total votes		150,583	100%
Turnout			
Democratic hold			

=== 1958 ===
1958 United States House of Representatives elections
Party	Candidate	Votes	%
Democratic	B. F. Sisk (incumbent)	112,702	81.1%
Republican	Daniel K. Halpin	26,228	18.9%
Total votes		138,930	100%
Turnout			
Democratic hold			

=== 1960 ===
1960 United States House of Representatives elections
Party	Candidate	Votes	%
Democratic	B. F. Sisk (incumbent)	141,974	100.0%
Turnout			
Democratic hold			

=== 1962 ===
1962 United States House of Representatives elections
Party	Candidate	Votes	%
Republican	Burt Talcott (incumbent)	75,424	61.3%
Democratic	William K. Steward	47,576	38.7%
Total votes		123,000	100.0%
Turnout			
Republican win (new seat)			

=== 1964 ===
1964 United States House of Representatives elections
Party	Candidate	Votes	%
Republican	Burt Talcott (incumbent)	93,112	61.9%
Democratic	William K. Steward	57,242	38.1%
Total votes		150,354	100.0%
Turnout			
Republican hold			

=== 1966 ===
1966 United States House of Representatives elections
Party	Candidate	Votes	%
Republican	Burt Talcott (incumbent)	108,070	77.3%
Democratic	Gerald V. Barron	31,787	22.7%
Total votes		139,857	100.0%
Turnout			
Republican hold			

=== 1968 ===
1968 United States House of Representatives elections
Party	Candidate	Votes	%
Republican	Burt Talcott (incumbent)	140,713	94.9%
American Independent	Ann J. Holliday	7,593	5.1%
Total votes		148,308	100.0%
Turnout			
Republican hold			

=== 1970 ===
1970 United States House of Representatives elections
Party	Candidate	Votes	%
Republican	Burt Talcott (incumbent)	95,549	63.6%
Democratic	O'Brien Riordan	50,942	33.9%
Peace and Freedom	Herbert H. Foster Jr.	3,682	2.5%
Total votes		150,173	100.0%
Turnout			
Republican hold			

=== 1972 ===
1972 United States House of Representatives elections
Party	Candidate	Votes	%
Republican	Burt Talcott (incumbent)	105,555	54.0%
Democratic	Julian Camacho	84,268	43.1%
American Independent	Stanley K. Monteith	5,753	2.9%
Total votes		195,576	100.0%
Turnout			
Republican hold			

=== 1974 ===
1974 United States House of Representatives elections
Party	Candidate	Votes	%
Republican	Pete McCloskey (incumbent)	103,228	69.1%
Democratic	Gary G. Gillmor	46,197	30.9%
Total votes		149,425	100.0%
Turnout			
Republican hold			

=== 1976 ===
1976 United States House of Representatives elections
Party	Candidate	Votes	%
Republican	Pete McCloskey (incumbent)	130,332	66.2%
Democratic	David T. Harris	61,526	31.3%
American Independent	Joseph David "Joss" Cooney	4,999	2.5%
Total votes		196,857	100.0%
Turnout			
Republican hold			

=== 1978 ===
1978 United States House of Representatives elections
Party	Candidate	Votes	%
Republican	Pete McCloskey (incumbent)	116,982	73.1%
Democratic	Kirsten Olsen	34,472	21.5%
American Independent	Harold R. Boylan	5,609	3.5%
Peace and Freedom	Adele Fumino	3,022	1.9%
Total votes		160,085	100.0%
Turnout			
Republican hold			

=== 1980 ===
1980 United States House of Representatives elections
Party	Candidate	Votes	%
Republican	Pete McCloskey (incumbent)	143,817	72.2%
Democratic	Kirsten Olsen	37,009	18.6%
Libertarian	Bill Evers	15,073	7.6%
Peace and Freedom	Adele Fumino	3,184	1.6%
Total votes		199,083	100.0%
Turnout			
Republican hold			

=== 1982 ===
1982 United States House of Representatives elections
Party	Candidate	Votes	%
Republican	Ed Zschau	115,365	63.0%
Democratic	Emmett Lynch	61,372	33.5%
Libertarian	William C. "Bill" White	6,471	3.5%
Total votes		183,208	100.0%
Turnout			
Republican hold			

=== 1984 ===
1984 United States House of Representatives elections
Party	Candidate	Votes	%
Republican	Ed Zschau (incumbent)	155,795	61.7%
Democratic	Martin Carnoy	91,026	36.0%
Libertarian	William C. "Bill" White	5,872	2.3%
Total votes		252,963	100.0%
Turnout			
Republican hold			

=== 1986 ===
1986 United States House of Representatives elections
Party	Candidate	Votes	%
Republican	Ernie Konnyu	111,252	59.5%
Democratic	Lance T. Weil	69,564	37.2%
Libertarian	William C. "Bill" White	6,227	3.3%
Total votes		187,043	100.0%
Turnout			
Republican hold			

=== 1988 ===
1988 United States House of Representatives elections
Party	Candidate	Votes	%
Republican	Tom Campbell	136,384	51.7%
Democratic	Anna Eshoo	121,523	46.0%
Libertarian	Tom Grey	6,023	2.3%
Total votes		263,930	100.0%
Turnout			
Republican hold			

=== 1990 ===
1990 United States House of Representatives elections
Party	Candidate	Votes	%
Republican	Tom Campbell (incumbent)	125,157	60.8%
Democratic	Bob Palmer	69,270	33.7%
Libertarian	Chuck Olson	11,271	5.5%
Total votes		205,698	100.0%
Turnout			
Republican hold			

=== 1992 ===
1992 United States House of Representatives elections
Party	Candidate	Votes	%
Democratic	Tom Lantos	157,205	68.8%
Republican	Jim R. Tomlin	53,278	23.3%
Peace and Freedom	Mary Weldon	10,142	4.4%
Libertarian	George L. O'Brien	7,782	3.4%
Total votes		228,407	100.0%
Turnout			
Democratic gain from Republican			

=== 1994 ===
1994 United States House of Representatives elections
Party	Candidate	Votes	%
Democratic	Tom Lantos (incumbent)	118,408	67.42%
Republican	Deborah Wilder	57,228	32.58%
Total votes		175,636	100.0%
Turnout			
Democratic hold			

=== 1996 ===
1996 United States House of Representatives elections
Party	Candidate	Votes	%
Democratic	Tom Lantos (incumbent)	149,052	71.7%
Republican	Storm Jenkins	49,278	23.8%
Libertarian	Christopher Schmidt	6,111	2.9%
Natural Law	Richard Bong	3,472	1.6%
Total votes		207,913	100.0%
Turnout			
Democratic hold			

=== 1998 ===
1998 United States House of Representatives elections
Party	Candidate	Votes	%
Democratic	Tom Lantos (incumbent)	128,135	73.98%
Republican	Robert H. Evans Jr.	36,562	21.11%
Libertarian	Michael J. Moloney	8,515	4.92%
Total votes		173,212	100.0%
Turnout			
Democratic hold			

=== 2000 ===
2000 United States House of Representatives elections in California
Party	Candidate	Votes	%
Democratic	Tom Lantos (incumbent)	158,404	74.6%
Republican	Mike Garza	44,162	20.8%
Libertarian	Barbara J. Less	6,431	3.0%
Natural Law	Rifkin Young	3,559	1.6%
Total votes		212,556	100.0%
Turnout			
Democratic hold			

=== 2002 ===
2002 United States House of Representatives elections in California
Party	Candidate	Votes	%
Democratic	Tom Lantos (incumbent)	105,597	68.1%
Republican	Michael J. Moloney	38,381	24.8%
Libertarian	Maad Abu-Ghazalah	11,006	7.1%
Total votes		185,216	100.0%
Turnout			
Democratic hold			

=== 2004 ===
2004 United States House of Representatives elections in California
Party	Candidate	Votes	%
Democratic	Tom Lantos (incumbent)	171,852	68.1%
Republican	Mike Garza	52,593	20.8%
Green	Pat Green	23,038	9.1%
Libertarian	Harland Harrison	5,116	2.0%
Total votes		252,599	100.0%
Turnout			
Democratic hold			

=== 2006 ===
2006 United States House of Representatives elections in California
Party	Candidate	Votes	%
Democratic	Tom Lantos (incumbent)	138,650	76.1%
Republican	Mike Moloney	43,674	23.9%
Total votes		182,324	100.0%
Turnout			
Democratic hold			

=== 2008 (Special) ===
2008 special election
Party	Candidate	Votes	%
Democratic	Jackie Speier	66,279	76.90%
Republican	Greg Conlon	7,990	9.27%
Democratic	Michelle McMurry	4,546	5.27%
Republican	Mike Moloney	4,517	5.24%
Green	Barry Hermanson	1,947	2.26%
Libertarian	Kevin Peterson (write-in)	2	0.00%
Invalid or blank votes		903	1.05%
Total votes		86,184	100.00%
Turnout			25.69%
Democratic hold			

=== 2008 ===
2008 United States House of Representatives elections in California
Party	Candidate	Votes	%
Democratic	Jackie Speier (incumbent)	200,442	75.2%
Republican	Greg Conlon	49,258	18.5%
Peace and Freedom	Nathalie Hrizi	5,793	2.2%
Green	Barry Hermanson	5,776	2.1%
Libertarian	Kevin Dempsey Peterson	5,584	2.0%
Total votes		266,853	100%
Turnout			
Democratic hold			

=== 2010 ===
2010 United States House of Representatives elections in California
Party	Candidate	Votes	%
Democratic	Jackie Speier (incumbent)	152,044	75.6%
Republican	Mike Moloney	44,475	22.2%
Libertarian	Mark Paul Williams	4,611	2.2%
Independent	Joseph Michael Harding (write-in)	32	0.0%
Total votes		201,162	100%
Turnout			
Democratic hold			

=== 2012 ===
2012 United States House of Representatives elections in California
Party	Candidate	Votes	%
Democratic	Nancy Pelosi	253,709	85.1%
Republican	John Dennis	44,478	14.9%
Total votes		298,187	100.0%
Democratic hold			

=== 2014 ===
2014 United States House of Representatives elections in California
Party	Candidate	Votes	%
Democratic	Nancy Pelosi (incumbent)	160,067	83.3%
Republican	John Dennis	32,197	16.7%
Total votes		192,264	100.0%
Democratic hold			

=== 2016 ===
2016 United States House of Representatives elections in California
Party	Candidate	Votes	%
Democratic	Nancy Pelosi (incumbent)	274,035	80.9%
Independent	Preston Picus	64,810	19.1%
Total votes		338,845	100%
Democratic hold			

=== 2018 ===
2018 United States House of Representatives elections in California
Party	Candidate	Votes	%
Democratic	Nancy Pelosi (incumbent)	275,292	86.8%
Republican	Lisa Remmer	41,780	13.2%
Total votes		317,072	100%
Democratic hold			

=== 2020 ===
2020 United States House of Representatives elections in California
Party	Candidate	Votes	%
Democratic	Nancy Pelosi (incumbent)	281,776	77.6%
Democratic	Shahid Buttar	81,174	22.4%
Total votes		362,950	100%
Democratic hold			

=== 2022 ===
2022 United States House of Representatives elections in California
Party	Candidate	Votes	%
Democratic	Barbara Lee (incumbent)	217,110	90.5%
Republican	Stephen Slauson	22,859	9.5%
Total votes		239,969	100%
Democratic hold			

=== 2024 ===
2024 United States House of Representatives elections in California
Party	Candidate	Votes	%
Democratic	Lateefah Simon	185,176	65.4
Democratic	Jennifer Tran	97,849	34.6
Total votes		283,025	100%
Democratic hold			

== See also ==
- List of United States congressional districts
- California's congressional districts

== Notes ==
U.S. House of Representatives
Preceded by Wisconsin's 1st congressional district	Home district of the speaker January 3, 2019 – January 3, 2023	Succeeded by California's 20th congressional district
