= Eugene W. Nixon =

American football coach and administrator (1885–1969)

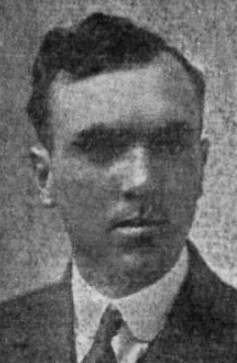
- Nixon pictured in the Quad-City Times, 1916

Biographical details
- Born: January 6, 1885; Marissa, Illinois, U.S.
- Died: March 5, 1969 (aged 84); Pomona, California, U.S.
- Education: Monmouth College

Playing career

Football
- c. 1905–1906: Monmouth (IL)

Basketball
- c. 1905: Monmouth (IL)

Baseball
- c. 1905: Monmouth (IL)

Track
- c. 1905: Monmouth (IL)
- Positions: Center fielder (baseball); High jump (track)

Coaching career (HC unless noted)

Football
- 1909–1915: Davenport HS (IA)
- 1916–1934: Pomona

Track
- 1909–1916: Davenport HS (IA)

Administrative career (AD unless noted)
- 1924–1951: Pomona

Head coaching record
- Overall: 70–52–7 (college football)

Accomplishments and honors

Championships
- 8 SCC (1917, 1919–1920, 1922–1924, 1926–1927)

Eugene White Nixon (January 6, 1885 – March 5, 1969) was an American football coach and college athletics administrator. He served as the head football coach at Pomona College in Claremont, California from 1916 to 1934, compiling a record of 70–52–7. Nixon was also the athletic director at Pomona from 1924 until his retirement in 1951.

A native of Sparta, Illinois, Nixon attended Monmouth College in Monmouth, Illinois, where he starred in athletics. He played on Monmouth's football teams that won championships of three states in 1905 and 1906. He also lettered in basketball, played as a center fielder in baseball, and set a school record for the high jump in track. Outside of sports, Nixon was the student body president at Monmouth and a fraternity leader. Nixon coached football and track at Davenport High School in Davenport, Iowa from 1909 until resigning in 1916 to move to Pomona.

In 1938, Nixon won the Republican Party nomination to represent California's 12th congressional district in the United States House of Representatives, but lost in the general election to incumbent Jerry Voorhis. Nixon died on March 5, 1969, at Pomona Valley Hospital in Pomona, California.

== Head coaching record ==
=== College football ===
| Year | Team | Overall | Conference | Standing | Bowl/playoffs |
|---|---|---|---|---|---|
Pomona Sagehens (Southern California Conference) (1916–1933)
| 1916 | Pomona | 4–3 | 2–2 | 3rd | |
| 1917 | Pomona | 5–0 | 4–0 | 1st | |
| 1918 | Pomona | 1–0–3 | | | |
| 1919 | Pomona | 5–1 | 4–0 | 1st | |
| 1920 | Pomona | 6–1 | 5–0 | 1st | |
| 1921 | Pomona | 2–3–1 | 2–2–1 | T–3rd | |
| 1922 | Pomona | 5–3 | 5–0 | 1st | |
| 1923 | Pomona | 5–2 | 4–1 | T–1st | |
| 1924 | Pomona | 5–2 | 5–0 | 1st | |
| 1925 | Pomona | 1–5–1 | 1–3–1 | T–5th | |
| 1926 | Pomona | 5–2 | 5–2 | 1st | |
| 1927 | Pomona | 6–0–1 | 6–0–1 | 1st | |
| 1928 | Pomona | 4–3 | 4–1 | T–2nd | |
| 1929 | Pomona | 6–2 | 5–1 | 2nd | |
| 1930 | Pomona | 2–5 | 2–3 | T–3rd | |
| 1931 | Pomona | 2–6 | 2–3 | 6th | |
| 1932 | Pomona | 2–4 | 2–4 | T–5th | |
| 1933 | Pomona | 2–5 | 2–5 | T–5th | |
Pomona Sagehens (Independent) (1934)
| 1934 | Pomona | 2–5–1 | | | |
| Pomona: | | 70–52–7 | | | |
| Total: | | 70–52–7 | | | |
National championship Conference title Conference division title or championship game berth
