= J. Arthur Younger =

American politician (1893–1967)

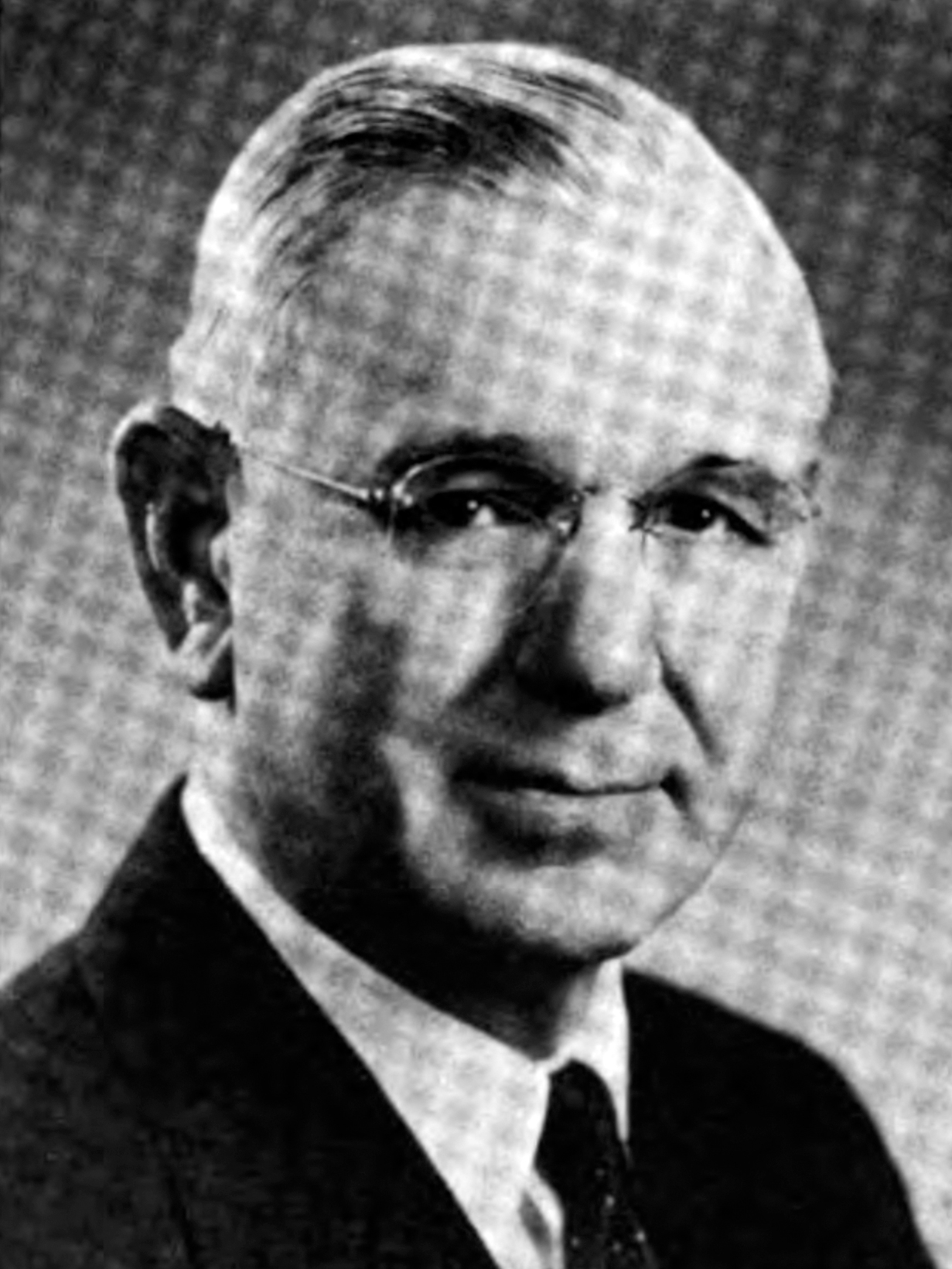

Member of the U.S. House of Representatives from California
- In office January 3, 1953 – June 20, 1967
- Preceded by: Allan O. Hunter (redistricting)
- Succeeded by: Pete McCloskey
- Constituency: 9th district (1953–63); 11th district (1963–67)

Personal details
- Born: Jesse Arthur Younger; April 11, 1893 Albany, Oregon, U.S.
- Died: June 20, 1967 (aged 74) Washington, D.C., U.S.
- Party: Republican
- Education: University of Washington
- Occupation: Banker

Military service
- Branch/service: Washington National Guard
- Years of service: August 1917-June 1919

Jesse Arthur Younger (April 11, 1893 – June 20, 1967) was an American businessman and World War I veteran who served as a United States representative from California. A member of the Republican Party, he was the first representative from San Mateo County, California, serving seven terms from 1953 to 1967.

== Early life and career ==
Born in Albany, Oregon, as an adolescent he moved to Kirkland, Washington, where he attended the public schools. Younger graduated from the University of Washington at Seattle in 1915.

=== World War I ===
He was drafted during World War I, serving in the Washington National Guard, and then overseas serving with the Forty-eighth Coast Artillery Corps for ten months until June 1919 when he was discharged as a captain.

=== Business career ===
He was employed at the Seattle Title Trust Co., from 1920 to 1930, where he was a manager, director and vice-president of the mortgage division. He subsequently became president of the Seattle Mortgage Loan Co. from 1930 to 1934.

== Congress ==
He was elected to Congress in 1952. After several other successful reelection efforts, he defeated William Keller in 1962 to retain his seat. Younger voted in favor of the Civil Rights Acts of 1957, 1960, and 1964, as well as the 24th Amendment to the U.S. Constitution and the Voting Rights Act of 1965.

== Death and legacy ==
Younger died from leukemia at Walter Reed Army Medical Center in Washington on June 20, 1967, at the age of 74.

A principal thoroughfare in San Mateo County, State Route 92, was named in Younger's honor, as the "J. Arthur Younger Freeway".

== Electoral history ==
J. Arthur Younger electoral history

United States House of Representatives elections, 1952
| Party | Candidate | Votes | % |
|---|---|---|---|
| Republican | J. Arthur Younger (incumbent) | 71,426 | 53.1 |
| Democratic | Harold F. Taggart | 61,028 | 45.3 |
| Progressive | Charles S. Brown | 2,140 | 1.6 |
| Total votes | | 134,594 | 100.0 |
| Turnout | | | |
| Republican win (new seat) | | | |

United States House of Representatives elections, 1954
| Party | Candidate | Votes | % |
|---|---|---|---|
| Republican | J. Arthur Younger (incumbent) | 60,648 | 54.5 |
| Democratic | Harold F. Taggart | 50,619 | 45.5 |
| Total votes | | 111,267 | 100.0 |
| Turnout | | | |
| Republican hold | | | |

United States House of Representatives elections, 1956
| Party | Candidate | Votes | % |
|---|---|---|---|
| Republican | J. Arthur Younger (incumbent) | 96,388 | 60.3 |
| Democratic | James T. McKay | 63,504 | 39.7 |
| Total votes | | 159,892 | 100.0 |
| Turnout | | | |
| Republican hold | | | |

United States House of Representatives elections, 1958
| Party | Candidate | Votes | % |
|---|---|---|---|
| Republican | J. Arthur Younger (incumbent) | 90,735 | 58.8 |
| Democratic | Elma D. Oddstad | 63,597 | 41.2 |
| Total votes | | 154,332 | 100.0 |
| Turnout | | | |
| Republican hold | | | |

United States House of Representatives elections, 1960
| Party | Candidate | Votes | % |
|---|---|---|---|
| Republican | J. Arthur Younger (incumbent) | 116,589 | 59.2 |
| Democratic | John D. Kaster | 80,227 | 40.8 |
| Total votes | | 196,816 | 100.0 |
| Turnout | | | |
| Republican hold | | | |

1962 United States House of Representatives elections in California
| Party | Candidate | Votes | % |
|---|---|---|---|
| Republican | J. Arthur Younger (Incumbent) | 101,963 | 62.3 |
| Democratic | John D. Kaster | 61,623 | 37.7 |
| Total votes | | 163,586 | 100.0 |
| Turnout | | | |
| Republican hold | | | |

1964 United States House of Representatives elections in California
| Party | Candidate | Votes | % |
|---|---|---|---|
| Republican | J. Arthur Younger (Incumbent) | 116,022 | 54.8 |
| Democratic | W. Mark Sullivan | 95,747 | 45.2 |
| Total votes | | 211,769 | 100.0 |
| Turnout | | | |
| Republican hold | | | |

== See also ==
- List of members of the United States Congress who died in office (1950–1999)
- List of United States representatives from California

U.S. House of Representatives
| Preceded by Allan O. Hunter | Member of the U.S. House of Representatives from California's 9th congressional district 1953–1963 | Succeeded by Don Edwards |
| Preceded by John J. McFall | Member of the U.S. House of Representatives from California's 11th congressional district 1963–1967 | Succeeded by Pete McCloskey |
