= John M. Ashbrook =

American politician (1928–1982)

John Ashbrook
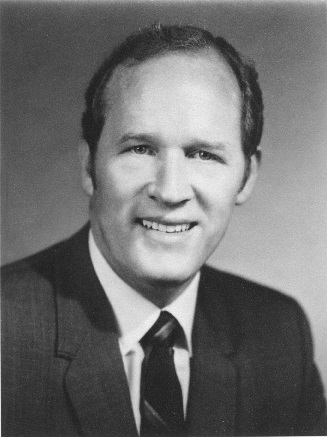

Member of the U.S. House of Representatives from Ohio's 17th district
- In office January 3, 1961 – April 24, 1982
- Preceded by: Robert W. Levering
- Succeeded by: Jean Ashbrook

Member of the Ohio House of Representatives
- In office January 1957 – January 3, 1961

Personal details
- Born: John Milan Ashbrook; September 21, 1928 Johnstown, Ohio, U.S.
- Died: April 24, 1982 (aged 53) Newark, Ohio, U.S.
- Party: Republican
- Spouses: Joan Needels (m. 1948; div. 1971); Jean Spencer (m. 1974)
- Children: 3
- Relatives: William A. Ashbrook (father)
- Education: Harvard University (BA); Ohio State University (LLB)

John Milan Ashbrook (September 21, 1928 – April 24, 1982) was an American politician and newspaper publisher. A member of the Republican Party, he served in the United States House of Representatives from Ohio from 1961 until his death. Ashbrook was associated with the New Right. He ran against President Richard Nixon in the 1972 Republican Party presidential primaries, attempting to appeal to voters who believed Nixon was insufficiently conservative, but failed to win any statewide contests. At the time of his death, he was running for U.S. Senate in Ohio in the 1982 election.

== Early life ==
John Milan Ashbrook was born on September 21, 1928, in Johnstown, Ohio to U.S. Congressman William A. Ashbrook, a newspaper editor and Johnstown businessman, and his wife Marie Swank. Ashbrook graduated from Harvard University in 1952 and from Ohio State University's law school in 1955. In 1953, Ashbrook became the publisher of his father's newspaper, the Johnstown Independent. On July 3, 1948, he married Joan Needels and later had three children with her before they divorced in 1971. In 1974, he married Jean Spencer.

== Career ==
He was elected to the Ohio House of Representatives in 1956, and served two terms. In 1960, Ashbrook ran for and won the seat that his father had once held in the United States House of Representatives. Ashbrook voted against the Civil Rights Act of 1964, but in favor of the Civil Rights Act of 1968, as well as the 24th Amendment to the U.S. Constitution and the Voting Rights Act of 1965.

=== 1964 presidential election ===
With William Rusher and F. Clifton White, associates from the Young Republicans in the 1950s, Ashbrook was involved in the start-up of the Draft Goldwater Committee in 1961.

In 1966, journalist Drew Pearson reported that Ashbrook was one of a group of four Congressmen who had received the "Statesman of the Republic" award from Liberty Lobby for their "right-wing activities".

=== 1972 presidential election ===
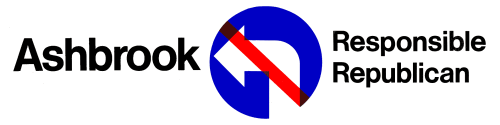
Presidential campaign logo

Despite having supported Richard Nixon during the 1968 presidential election Ashbrook turned against him during his presidency. On December 29, 1971 he announced that he would oppose Nixon in the Republican primaries as an alternative conservative candidate and received support from conservative figures such as William F. Buckley Jr. His slogan "No Left Turns" was illustrated by a mock traffic symbol of a left-turn arrow with a superimposed No symbol. It was meant to symbolize the frustration of some conservatives with Nixon, whom they saw as having abandoned conservative principles and "turned left" on issues such as budget deficits, affirmative action, the creation of the Environmental Protection Agency, wage and price controls, and most of all, improving relations with the Soviet Union and the People's Republic of China with his policy of détente.

Ashbrook competed in the New Hampshire (9.8% of the vote), Florida (9%), and California (10%) primaries. He withdrew from the race after the California primary and "with great reluctance" supported Nixon. His campaign, although of minimal immediate impact, is remembered fondly by conservatives who admire Ashbrook for having stood for their principles. Ashbrook said in criticism of the Nixon administration, "I still believe it in the best American tradition to speak out even when it is in criticism of your party's actions."

When Nixon became mired in the Watergate scandal, Ashbrook became the first House Republican to call for the President's resignation.

== Death ==
In 1982, Ashbrook ran for the U.S. Senate, seeking to challenge Democratic incumbent Howard Metzenbaum. Polling showed that he was the frontrunner in the Republican primary. However, on April 24, 1982, he suffered a gastric hemorrhage at the offices of The Johnstown Independent, and died at Licking Memorial Hospital in Newark, Ohio, aged 53. President Ronald Reagan memorialized him, saying: "John Ashbrook was a man of courage and principle. He served his constituents and his country with dedication and devotion, always working towards the betterment of his fellow man. His patriotism and deep belief in the greatness of America never wavered and his articulate and passionate calls for a return to old-fashioned American values earned him the respect of all who knew him."

Ashbrook's widow, Jean Spencer Ashbrook, was chosen in a special election to serve the remaining seven months of his congressional term.

== Ashbrook Center ==
The Ashbrook Center for Public Affairs at Ashland University was named for Ashbrook in 1983. A periodic John M. Ashbrook Memorial Dinner at the center features leading conservative speakers from President Ronald Reagan (first dinner; dedication of the Center, in 1983) and Margaret Thatcher (1993) to Mitt Romney (April 2010) and John Boehner (June 2011).

== Electoral history ==
John M. Ashbrook electoral history

1960 Ohio Seventeenth Congressional District election
Party	Candidate	Votes	%	±%
Republican	John M. Ashbrook	79,609	53.05%	+4.73%
Democratic	Robert W. Levering (incumbent)	70,470	46.96%	−4.73%
Total votes		150,079	100.00%	

1962 Ohio Seventeenth Congressional District election
Party	Candidate	Votes	%	±%
Republican	John M. Ashbrook (incumbent)	69,976	58.61%	+5.56%
Democratic	Robert W. Levering	49,415	41.39%	−5.56%
Total votes		119,391	100.00%	

1964 Ohio Seventeenth Congressional District election
Party	Candidate	Votes	%	±%
Republican	John M. Ashbrook (incumbent)	75,674	51.49%	−7.12%
Democratic	Robert W. Levering	71,291	48.51%	+7.12%
Total votes		119,391	100.00%	

1966 Ohio Seventeenth Congressional District election
Party	Candidate	Votes	%	±%
Republican	John M. Ashbrook (incumbent)	73,132	55.34%	+3.85%
Democratic	Robert T. Secrest (incumbent)	59,031	44.67%	−3.85%
Total votes		132,163	100.00%	

1968 Ohio Seventeenth Congressional District election
Party	Candidate	Votes	%	±%
Republican	John M. Ashbrook (incumbent)	100,148	64.92%	+9.58%
Democratic	Robert W. Levering	54,127	35.09%	−9.58%
Total votes		154,275	100.00%	

1970 Ohio Seventeenth Congressional District election
Party	Candidate	Votes	%	±%
Republican	John M. Ashbrook (incumbent)	79,472	62.19%	−2.73%
Democratic	James C. Hood	44,066	34.48%	−0.61%
American Independent	Clifford J. Simpson	4,253	3.33%	+3.33%
Total votes		127,791	100.00%	

1972 Ohio Seventeenth Congressional District Republican primary
Party	Candidate	Votes	%	±%
Republican	John M. Ashbrook (incumbent)	28,582	75.32%	
Republican	William L. White	9,366	24.68%	
Total votes		37,948	100.00%	

1972 Ohio Seventeenth Congressional District election
Party	Candidate	Votes	%	±%
Republican	John M. Ashbrook (incumbent)	92,666	57.36%	−4.83%
Democratic	Raymond C. Beck	62,512	38.69%	+4.21%
American Independent	Clifford J. Simpson	6,376	3.95%	+0.62%
Total votes		161,554	100.00%	

1974 Ohio Seventeenth Congressional District Republican primary
Party	Candidate	Votes	%	±%
Republican	John M. Ashbrook (incumbent)	22,845	70.72%	−4.60%
Republican	David L. Martin	9,458	29.28%	
Total votes		32,303	100.00%	

1974 Ohio Seventeenth Congressional District election
Party	Candidate	Votes	%	±%
Republican	John M. Ashbrook (incumbent)	70,708	52.75%	−4.61%
Democratic	David D. Noble	63,342	47.25%	+8.56%
Independent	Clifford J. Simpson	3	0.00%	−3.95%
Total votes		134,053	100.00%	

1976 Ohio Seventeenth Congressional District Republican primary
Party	Candidate	Votes	%	±%
Republican	John M. Ashbrook (incumbent)	35,836	83.03%	+12.31%
Republican	Donald C. Wickham	7,326	16.97%	
Total votes		43,162	100.00%	

1976 Ohio Seventeenth Congressional District election
Party	Candidate	Votes	%	±%
Republican	John M. Ashbrook (incumbent)	94,874	56.80%	+4.05%
Democratic	John C. McDonald	72,168	43.20%	−4.05%
Total votes		167,042	100.00%	

1978 Ohio Seventeenth Congressional District election
Party	Candidate	Votes	%	±%
Republican	John M. Ashbrook (incumbent)	87,010	67.38%	+10.58%
Democratic	Kenneth R. Grier	42,117	32.62%	−10.58%
Total votes		129,127	100.00%	

1980 Ohio Seventeenth Congressional District election
Party	Candidate	Votes	%	±%
Republican	John M. Ashbrook (incumbent)	128,870	72.90%	+5.52%
Democratic	Donald E. Yunker	47,900	27.10%	−5.52%
Total votes		176,770	100.00%	

== See also ==
- List of Harvard University politicians
- List of members of the United States Congress who died in office (1950–1999)
- List of United States representatives from Ohio
- List of members of the House Un-American Activities Committee

U.S. House of Representatives
Preceded by Robert W. Levering	Member of the U.S. House of Representatives from Ohio's 17th congressional district 1961–1982	Succeeded by Jean Ashbrook
