= Pete McCloskey =

American politician (1927–2024)

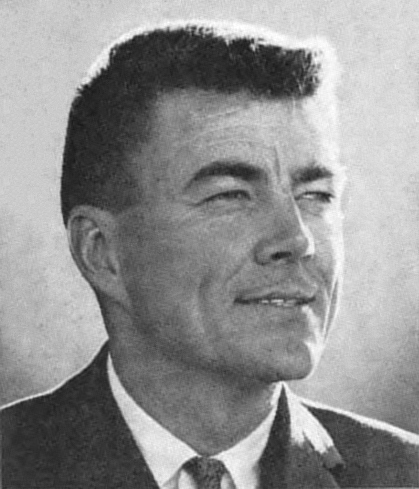
- McCloskey in 1969

Member of the U.S. House of Representatives from California
- In office December 12, 1967 – January 3, 1983
- Preceded by: J. Arthur Younger
- Succeeded by: Ed Zschau
- Constituency: 11th district (1967–1973); 17th district (1973–1975); 12th district (1975–1983)

Personal details
- Born: Paul Norton McCloskey Jr. September 29, 1927 Loma Linda, California, U.S.
- Died: May 8, 2024 (aged 96) Winters, California, U.S.
- Party: Republican (1948–2007); Democratic (2007–2024)
- Spouse(s): Caroline Wadsworth (m. 1949; div. 1972) Helen Hooper (m. 1982)
- Children: 4
- Education: Stanford University (AB, LLB)

Military service
- Allegiance: United States
- Branch/service: United States Navy (1945–1947); U.S. Marine Corps (1950–1952); U.S. Marine Forces Reserve (1952–1974)
- Years of service: 1945–1964
- Rank: Colonel
- Battles/wars: Korean War
- Awards: Navy Cross; Silver Star; Purple Heart (2)

Paul Norton "Pete" McCloskey Jr. (September 29, 1927 – May 8, 2024) was an American politician who represented San Mateo County, California, as a Republican in the United States House of Representatives from 1967 to 1983.

Born in Loma Linda, California, McCloskey pursued a legal career in Palo Alto, California, after graduating from Stanford Law School. He served in the Korean War as a member of the United States Marine Corps. For his service, he was awarded the Navy Cross and the Silver Star. He won election to the House of Representatives in 1967, defeating Shirley Temple in the Republican primary. He was a co-author of the Endangered Species Act of 1973. He unsuccessfully challenged President Richard Nixon in the 1972 Republican primaries on an anti-Vietnam War platform and was the first member of Congress to publicly call for President Nixon's resignation after the Saturday Night Massacre.

McCloskey continually won re-election until 1982, when he unsuccessfully sought the Republican nomination to represent California in the United States Senate. The nomination was won by Pete Wilson, who went on to defeat Jerry Brown in the general election. During the 1988 Republican presidential primaries, McCloskey helped end Pat Robertson's campaign by revealing that Robertson's claims of serving in combat were false. In 1989, McCloskey co-founded the Council for the National Interest, a non-profit, non-partisan organization that works for "Middle East policies that serve the American national interest." He strongly opposed the Iraq War and supported Democrat John Kerry in the 2004 presidential election. In 2006, he made an unsuccessful run for Congress against Republican Richard Pombo. He endorsed Democrat Jerry McNerney in the general election and became a Democrat himself shortly thereafter.

== Early life ==
Pete McCloskey's great-grandfather was orphaned in the Great Irish Famine and came to California in 1853 at the age of 16. He and his son, McCloskey's grandfather, were farmers in Merced County. The family were lifelong Republicans.

McCloskey was born on September 29, 1927, in Loma Linda, California, the son of Mary Vera (McNabb) and Paul Norton McCloskey. He attended public schools in South Pasadena and San Marino. He was inducted into South Pasadena High School Hall of Fame for the sport of baseball. He attended Occidental College and California Institute of Technology under the U.S. Navy's V-5 Pilot Program. He graduated from Stanford University in 1950 and Stanford University Law School in 1953.

== Military service ==
McCloskey voluntarily served in the U.S. Navy from 1945 to 1947, the U.S. Marine Corps from 1950 to 1952, the United States Marine Corps Reserve from 1952 to 1960 and the Ready Reserve from 1960 to 1967. He retired from the Marine Corps Reserve in 1974, having attained the rank of colonel. He was awarded the Navy Cross and Silver Star decorations for heroism in combat and two Purple Hearts as a Marine during the Korean War. He then volunteered for the Vietnam War before eventually turning against it. In 1992, he wrote his fourth book, The Taking of Hill 610, describing some of his exploits in Korea.

== Political career ==
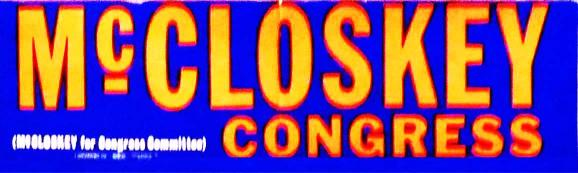
Congressional campaign bumper sticker

McCloskey served as a Deputy District Attorney for Alameda County, California, from 1953 to 1954 and practiced law in Palo Alto, California, from 1955 to 1967, cofounding the firm McCloskey, Wilson & Mosher, a forerunner to the firm that eventually became Wilson Sonsini Goodrich & Rosati. He was a lecturer on legal ethics at Santa Clara University and Stanford Law School from 1964 to 1967.

=== Congress ===
He was elected as a Republican to the 90th Congress, by special election, to fill the vacancy caused by the death of U.S. House of Representatives member J. Arthur Younger, after defeating Shirley Temple in the primary. He was reelected to the seven succeeding Congresses, serving from December 12, 1967, to January 3, 1983. In a 1981 interview, he stated that he thought he "was the first Republican elected opposing the war" despite the fact that his "constituency, two to one, favored the war in 1967."

McCloskey was the first member of Congress to publicly call for the impeachment of President Nixon after the Watergate scandal and the Saturday Night Massacre. He was also the first lawmaker to call for a repeal of the Gulf of Tonkin Resolution that had allowed for the War in Vietnam. He chose, in early 1975, to see for himself the effects of US bombing in Cambodia, stating afterwards that his country had committed "greater evil than we have done to any country in the world, and wholly without reason, except for our benefit to fight against the Vietnamese."

1972 presidential campaign bumper sticker

In the 1972 Republican Party presidential primaries McCloskey campaigned on a pro-peace/anti-Vietnam War platform and obtained 19.7 percent of the vote against incumbent President Richard M. Nixon in the New Hampshire primary. At the New Mexico Republican Party state convention U.S. House of Representatives member Manuel Lujan Jr. cast a decisive vote that resulted in McCloskey being awarded a national convention delegate. Consequently, at the Republican National Convention in Miami Beach, Florida, Rep. McCloskey received one vote (out of 1,348) from a New Mexico delegate; all other votes cast went to Nixon. In 2016, McCloskey published a tribute to Lujan titled An Honest Public Servant.

In January 1980, McCloskey was one of six members of an official bipartisan delegation of the House of Representatives appointed by Speaker Tip O'Neill to visit Lebanon, Syria, and Israel. In Beirut the delegation met with Palestine Liberation Organization chairman Yasir Arafat with a plan to conclude the trip with a meeting with Prime Minister Menachem Begin and other Israeli leaders in Jerusalem.

In 1980, he endorsed Ronald Reagan over Jimmy Carter, despite his conflict with Reagan, saying that there's bigger chance of war under Carter than Reagan.

In June 1981, in a speech to retired United States military officers, McCloskey said: "'We've got to overcome the tendency of the Jewish community in America to control the actions of Congress and force the President and the Congress not to be evenhanded' in the Middle East." In a press conference later the same day Mr. McCloskey criticized Menachem Begin for lobbying the Rev. Jerry Falwell for support for the June 7, 1981, Israeli airstrike on an unfinished Iraqi nuclear reactor and added, "We have to respect the views of our Jewish citizens, but not be controlled by them." McCloskey later defended his remarks saying "There is a strong Jewish lobby ... I do not understand why the Jewish community should resent it being labeled as such. They are a very effective lobby." However, he also predicted that criticism by B'nai B'rith officials in California would harm his prospects of winning the 1982 Republican Senate primary there.

Shortly after Israel's passage of the Golan Heights Law on December 14, 1981, McCloskey denounced the move as an "aggressive and imperialistic action" and urged his Congressional colleagues to block a $2.2 billion foreign aid package to Israel unless the action was rescinded. He said the "annexation of the Golan Heights was another step which could eventually drag the U.S. into a nuclear war."

In 1982, McCloskey was an unsuccessful Republican candidate for nomination to the United States Senate. The California Republican Senatorial primary that year was a contentious battle among the major candidates in the 12-person GOP field, featuring mainly Reps. McCloskey, Bob Dornan, Barry Goldwater Jr. (son of Arizona U.S. Senate member and 1964 Republican presidential nominee Barry Goldwater), Maureen Reagan (daughter of then-President Ronald Reagan), San Diego Mayor Pete Wilson, former U.S. House of Representatives member John G. Schmitz, and Los Angeles Chamber of Commerce president Ted Bruinsma. Wilson was the eventual victor and went on to defeat the Democratic candidate, then-Governor Jerry Brown, in the general election.

According to Paul Findley, McCloskey was hounded by the Anti-Defamation League, both during his political career and when he retired to private practice as a lawyer, for his outspoken views on Israel's attitude to Palestinians and on the Israel lobby.

=== 2006 run for Congress ===
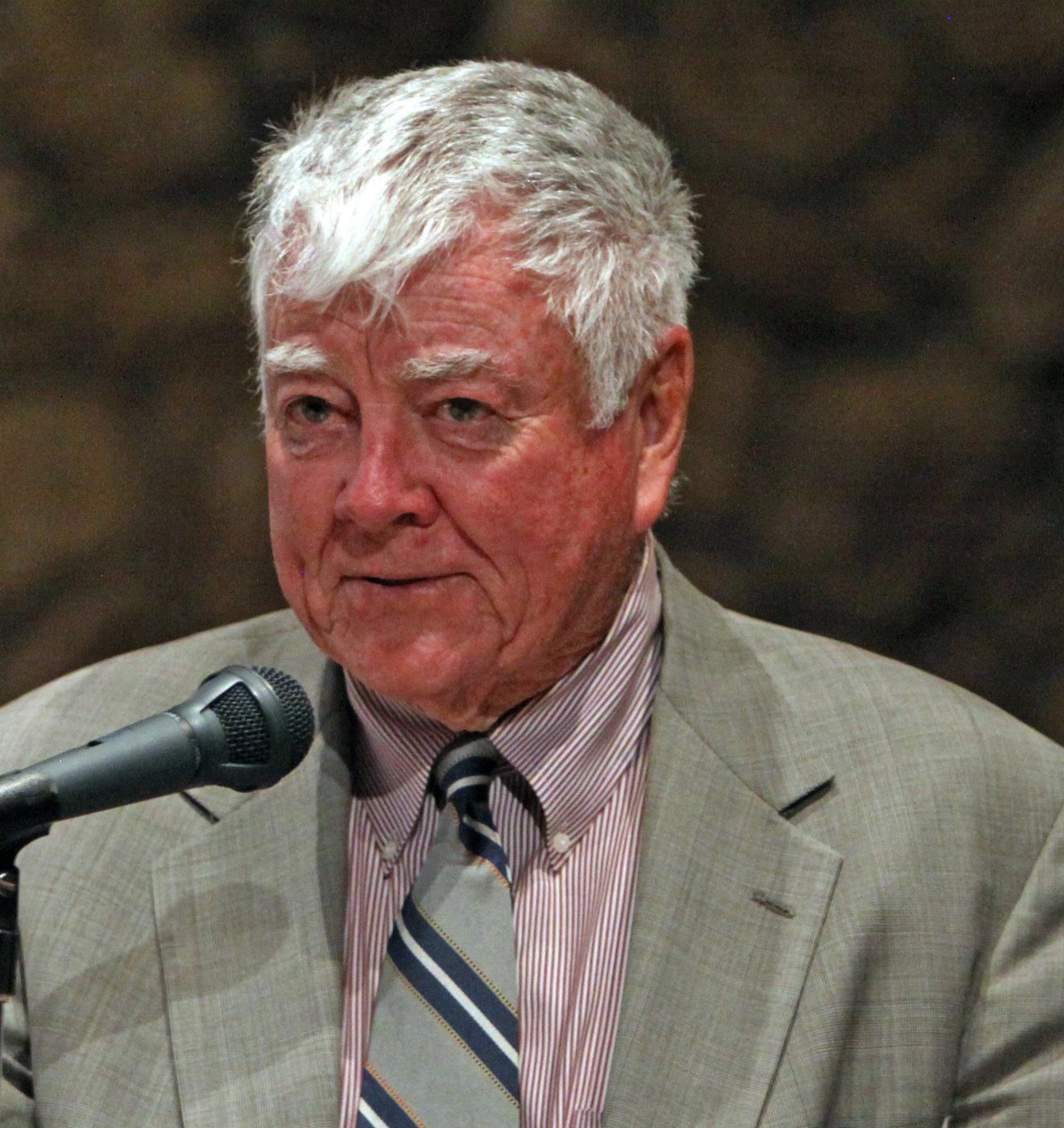
McCloskey in 2014

On January 23, 2006, McCloskey announced at a press conference in Lodi, California, that he would return to the political arena by running against seven-term incumbent Republican Richard Pombo in the Republican Party for California's 11th congressional district. Earlier in the year, he formed a group called the "Revolt of the Elders" to recruit a viable primary candidate to run against Pombo. McCloskey's aging campaign bus sported the slogan "Restore Ethics to Congress." McCloskey said, "Congressmen are like diapers. You need to change them often, and for the same reason." McCloskey was endorsed in the Republican Party primary by the San Francisco Chronicle and the Los Angeles Times. In the June 6, 2006 primary, McCloskey was defeated by Pombo, receiving 32 percent of the vote.

On July 24, 2006, McCloskey endorsed Jerry McNerney, a Democrat who defeated Pombo in the 2006 midterm elections. McCloskey spent most of Election Night at McNerney's victory party. The Sierra Club recognized McCloskey for helping to unseat Pombo with their 2006 Edgar Wayburn Award.

==== IHR/Holocaust controversy ====
During the 2006 primary campaign there was controversy over what McCloskey allegedly said about the Holocaust during his keynote address, titled "The Machinations of the Anti-Defamation League", to the May 2000 Institute for Historical Review conference. According to the San Jose Mercury News, McCloskey said at the time, "I don't know whether you are right or wrong about the Holocaust," and he referred to the "so-called Holocaust". McCloskey replied "that he has never questioned the existence of the Holocaust, and the 2000 quote referred to a debate over the number of people killed." McCloskey said in an interview with the Contra Costa Times on January 18, 2006, that the IHR transcript of his speech had been inaccurate.

Journalist Mark Hertsgaard of The Nation, in response to criticism of McCloskey following an article about the candidate's 2006 campaign, stated that a videotape he had viewed of McCloskey's speech to the IHR did not contain the "right or wrong" wording present in the transcript. According to Hertsgaard, McCloskey "told the delegates, 'I may not agree with you about everything I've heard today,' before he reiterated a core point of his speech—that the right for anyone to question what is said about the past is basic to freedom of thought in America." Hertsgaard also denied Rafael Medoff's claim that McCloskey praised the "'courage' of Holocaust deniers in Europe."

== Outside Congress ==
=== On Israeli–Palestinian issues ===
In 1984, McCloskey was invited to return to Stanford University as a visiting lecturer. The director of Hillel at Stanford characterized McCloskey's appointment as "a slap in the face of the Jewish community". Members of the student government also tried to pressure McCloskey to remove an article by former US diplomat George Ball from his course syllabus and "add materials reflecting pro-AIPAC views." Following a "faculty review" McCloskey's student opponents were censured for " 'serious abridgments' of academic freedom" and Stanford's Provost offered McCloskey a formal apology.

In 1986, McCloskey engaged in a debate about Israeli–Palestinian issues with Jewish Defense League founder Rabbi Meir Kahane. According to a disputed transcript of an event fourteen years later, McCloskey stated that two thousand people attended the 1986 debate which took place in San Francisco. The event was eventually turned into a short film titled, "Why Terrorism?" produced by Mark Green.

McCloskey and former Rep. Paul Findley (R-Ill.) helped arrange a June 8, 1991, White House ceremony during which forty-two surviving crew members of the USS Liberty, an intelligence ship attacked by Israeli forces in 1967, were belatedly presented the Presidential Unit Citation awarded, but never presented, to the ship's crew by President Johnson in 1968. The ceremony took place on the 24th anniversary of the incident, which killed thirty-four Americans, and was attended by White House Chief of Staff John Sununu and National Security Adviser Brent Scowcroft. The Anti-Defamation League (ADL) expressed concerns about whether the event was held "to give a stamp of approval to those seeking to malign Israel". The ADL singled out the participation of McCloskey and Findley as "staunch critics of Israel" and "expressed concern with their involvement 'and the sanction given by the White House of such rhetoric.' " In 1982, McCloskey was approached by a former Israeli senior lead pilot who admitted that he had recognized the Liberty as an American naval vessel during the attack, but was told to ignore the U.S. flag and continue his attack. Upon refusing to do so and returning to base, he was arrested. McCloskey remained a committed supporter of the "USS Liberty Veterans Association." He was planning to release a book in support of Liberty survivors titled The Most Infamous Order Ever Given: The Betrayal of the USS Liberty, which would have had many supporting documents in it.

=== Pat Robertson presidential campaign controversy ===
McCloskey contradicted Pat Robertson's statements about Korean War service and so helped put an end to Robertson's 1988 Presidential run. Robertson first claimed that he was a "combat veteran" back in 1981, which aroused the ire of McCloskey, who had been shipped to Korea along with Robertson as second lieutenants as part as the 5th Replacement Draft to bolster the First Marine Division, which had suffered great losses at the Battle of the Chosin Reservoir. McCloskey and Robertson were part of a contingent of 71 Marine officers and 1,900 enlisted men shipped to Korea aboard the USS General J. C. Breckinridge to serve as replacements.

When Robertson began claiming again that he was a combat veteran during the 1988 Republican primaries, McCloskey wrote a public letter to U.S. Representative Andrew Jacobs Jr., also a Marine veteran of the Korean War, in which McCloskey said that Robertson was actually spared combat duty when his powerful father, U.S. Senator A. Willis Robertson of Virginia, intervened on his behalf, and that Robertson had actually boasted that his father would keep him out of combat. Robertson, a college friend, and four other second lieutenants were shipped to Japan, detailed to a training mission for Marines coming out of Korea. Of the remaining Marine officers, half were killed or wounded in combat.

Robertson sued McCloskey and another accuser for libel and demanded damages of $35 million, but research underwritten by McCloskey that cost him $400,000 proved that his revelations had been true. Rather than being a combat veteran, Robertson had been shipped to Japan right off the USS Breckinridge, then spent most of his time when returned to Korea posted at the safe harbor of the Division Headquarters. Robertson served as the Division "liquor officer", responsible for keeping the officers' clubs supplied with alcohol, which meant he kept traveling back to Japan. It was claimed that Robertson sexually harassed a Korean woman at one of his clubs and worried about getting gonorrhea. Documentary evidence uncovered by McCloskey revealed that his father, Senator Robertson, thanked Marine Commandant Robinson for getting his son out of combat. By the time of the libel trial, which was scheduled for Super Tuesday, many other Marine officers were prepared to testify that Robertson had avoided combat duty. The day before the trial, Robertson dropped the libel suit. On Super Tuesday, he was punished at the polls. He later paid McCloskey's court costs.

McCloskey wrote a book about his Korean War experiences, The Taking of Hill 610.

=== Council of the National Interest ===
In 1989, McCloskey co-founded the Council for the National Interest along with former Congressman Paul Findley. It is a 501 (c)4 non-profit, non-partisan organization that works for "Middle East policies that serve the American national interest." He taught political science at Santa Clara University in the early 1980s. For many years, he practiced law in Redwood City, California and resided in Woodside, California.

=== Iraq War ===
An opponent of the Iraq War, McCloskey broke party ranks in 2004 to endorse John Kerry in his bid to unseat George W. Bush as President of the United States.

== Change of political affiliation ==
In the spring of 2007, McCloskey announced that he had changed his party affiliation to the Democratic Party. In an email and letter to the Tracy Press, McCloskey stressed that the "new brand of Republicanism" had finally led him to abandon the party that he had joined in 1948. He followed this up with an op-ed column in which he explained that "Disagreement [with party leadership] turned into disgust" and "I finally concluded that it was fraud for me to remain a member of this modern Republican Party", although it was a "decision not easily taken."

In the 2020 United States presidential election, McCloskey was nominated to be a member of the Democratic slate of electors for the state of California. As Democrat Joe Biden won the state's popular vote, McCloskey became one of California's 55 members of the Electoral College. He cast his presidential vote for Biden and vice-presidential vote for Kamala Harris on December 14, 2020.

== Political positions ==
McCloskey favored abortion rights and supported stem cell research as well as Oregon's assisted suicide law. He was a co-chair of the first Earth Day in 1970.

== Personal life and death ==
McCloskey's first marriage was to Caroline Wadsworth in 1949, and they had four children, Nancy, Peter, John, and Kathleen, before divorcing. He later married Helen V. Hooper.

On May 8, 2024, McCloskey died at his home in Winters, California, due to complications of kidney and congestive heart failure. He was 96.

== Electoral history ==
1967 Special election
Party	Candidate	Votes	%
Republican	Pete McCloskey	63,850	57.2
Democratic	Roy A. Archibald	43,759	39.2
Independent	Shirley Temple	3,938	3.5
Total votes		111,547	100.0
Turnout			
Republican hold			

1968 United States House of Representatives elections in California
Party	Candidate	Votes	%
Republican	Pete McCloskey (Incumbent)	165,482	79.3
Democratic	Urban G. Whitaker Jr.	40,979	19.6
Peace and Freedom	David Demorest Ransom	2,157	1.0
Total votes		208,618	100.0
Turnout			
Republican hold			

1970 United States House of Representatives elections in California
Party	Candidate	Votes	%
Republican	Pete McCloskey (Incumbent)	144,500	77.5
Democratic	Robert E. Gomperts	39,188	21.0
Independent	Scattering	2,786	1.5
Total votes		186,474	100.0
Turnout			
Republican hold			

1972 United States House of Representatives elections in California
Party	Candidate	Votes	%
Republican	Pete McCloskey (incumbent)	110,098	60.2
Democratic	James Stewart	72,759	39.8
Total votes		182,857	100.0
Turnout			
Republican hold			

1974 United States House of Representatives elections
Party	Candidate	Votes	%
Republican	Pete McCloskey (Incumbent)	103,228	69.1%
Democratic	Gary G. Gillmor	46,197	30.9%
Total votes		149,425	100.0%
Turnout			
Republican hold			

1976 United States House of Representatives elections
Party	Candidate	Votes	%
Republican	Pete McCloskey (Incumbent)	130,332	66.2%
Democratic	David T. Harris	61,526	31.3%
American Independent	Joseph David "Joss" Cooney	4,999	2.5%
Total votes		196,857	100.0%
Turnout			
Republican hold			

1978 United States House of Representatives elections
Party	Candidate	Votes	%
Republican	Pete McCloskey (Incumbent)	116,982	73.1%
Democratic	Kirsten Olsen	34,472	21.5%
American Independent	Harold R. Boylan	5,609	3.5%
Peace and Freedom	Adele Fumino	3,022	1.9%
Total votes		160,085	100.0%
Turnout			
Republican hold			

1980 United States House of Representatives elections
Party	Candidate	Votes	%
Republican	Pete McCloskey (Incumbent)	143,817	72.2%
Democratic	Kirsten Olsen	37,009	18.6%
Libertarian	Bill Evers	15,073	7.6%
Peace and Freedom	Adele Fumino	3,184	1.6%
Total votes		199,083	100.0%
Turnout			
Republican hold			

== Bibliography ==
- McCloskey, Paul Norton, The United States Constitution. Reading, Mass: Addison-Wesley Pub. Co., 1964. OCLC 221421526.
- McCloskey, Paul N., Truth and Untruth; Political Deceit in America. New York: Simon and Schuster, 1972. ISBN 067121201X. OCLC 266811.
- Boyle, Richard. The Flower of the Dragon: The Breakdown of the U.S. Army in Vietnam. Paul N. McCloskey (foreword). San Francisco: Ramparts Pr. 1972. ISBN 978-0878670208. OCLC 251881288.
- McCloskey, Paul N., and Helen Hooper McCloskey, The Taking of Hill 610: And Other Essays on Friendship. Woodside, CA: Eaglet Books, 1992. ISBN 978-0963518606. OCLC 28194371.
- McCloskey, Paul N. "Pete". An Honest Public Servant: A Brief Biography of Manuel Lujan, Republican Congressman of New Mexico, 1968–1988, Secretary of the Interior of the United States, 1989–1993. Rumsey, CA: Eaglet Books, 2016. ISBN 978-0692787793. OCLC 980362390.
- McCloskey, Paul N. "Pete" Jr. The Story Of The First Earth Day 1970: How Grassroots Activism Can Change Our World. Rumsey, CA: Eaglet Books, 2020. ISBN 978-0578657721.

== Films ==
- Earth Days (2009) (Self)
- The Most Dangerous Man in America: Daniel Ellsberg and the Pentagon Papers (2009) (Self)
- Pete McCloskey: Leading from the Front: The Story of a True Political Maverick (2010) (Self)
- GrowthBusters (2011) (Self)
- Last Days in Vietnam (2014) (Self)

== See also ==
U.S. House of Representatives
Preceded by J. Arthur Younger	Member of the U.S. House of Representatives from California's 11th congressional district 1967–1973	Succeeded by Leo Joseph Ryan Jr.
Preceded by Glenn M. Anderson	Member of the U.S. House of Representatives from California's 17th congressional district 1973–1975	Succeeded by John Hans Krebs
Preceded by Burt L. Talcott	Member of the U.S. House of Representatives from California's 12th congressional district 1975–1983	Succeeded by Ed Zschau
