= 1972 Republican Party presidential primaries =

Selection of Republican US presidential candidate

- March 7 to June 6, 1972

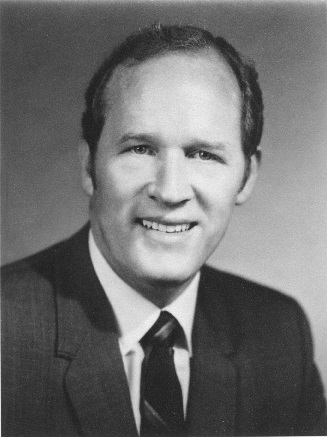
| Candidate | Richard Nixon | Uncommitted | John M. Ashbrook |
| Home state | California | N/A | Ohio |
| Contests won | 18 | 0 | 0 |
| Popular vote | 5,378,704 | 317,048 | 311,543 |
| Percentage | 86.9% | 5.1% | 5.0% |
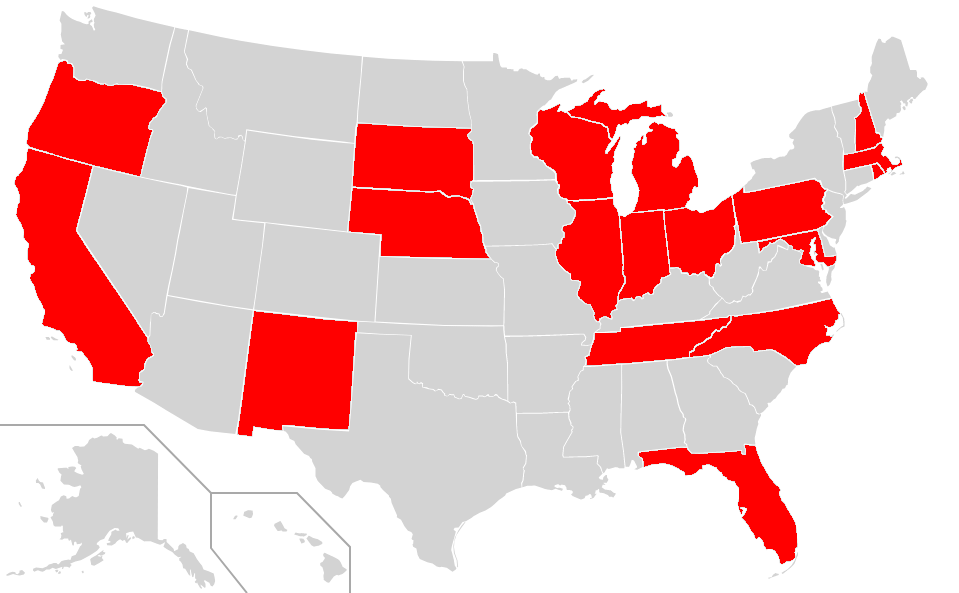
- First place finishes by preference primary results
Previous Republican nominee
Richard Nixon
Republican nominee
Richard Nixon

From March 7 to June 6, 1972, voters of the Republican Party chose its nominee for president in the 1972 United States presidential election. Incumbent President Richard Nixon was again selected as the nominee through a series of primary elections and caucuses culminating in the 1972 Republican National Convention held from August 21 to August 23, 1972, in Miami, Florida.

== Candidates ==
=== Nominee ===
| Candidate | Most recent office | Home state | Campaign Withdrawal date | Popular vote | Contests won | Running mate |
|---|---|---|---|---|---|---|
| Richard Nixon | President of the United States (1969–1974) | California | (Campaign); Secured nomination: August 23, 1972 | 5,378,704 (86.9%) | 18 | Spiro Agnew |

=== Withdrew during primaries ===
| Candidate | Most recent office | Home state | Campaign Withdrawal date | Popular vote | Contests won |
|---|---|---|---|---|---|
| John M. Ashbrook | U.S. Representative from Ohio (1961–1982) | Ohio | | 311,543 (5.0%) | 0 |
| Pete McCloskey | U.S. Representative from California (1967–1983) | California | | 132,731 (2.1%) | 0 |

== Endorsements ==
List of Richard Nixon 1972 presidential campaign endorsements

Cabinet Members

- David Packard, United States Deputy Secretary of Defense (1969–1971)
- William P. Rogers, United States Secretary of State (1969–1973)

Senators

- Bob Dole (R-KS)
- Jacob Javits (R-NY)
- Charles H. Percy (R-IL)

Former Representatives

- William M. Tuck, (D-VA)

Governors

- William T. Cahill (R-NJ)
- Thomas Meskill (R-CT)
- Richard B. Ogilvie (R-IL)
- Ronald Reagan (R-CA)
- Nelson Rockefeller (R-NY)

Former Governors

- C. Farris Bryant, (D-FL)
- John Connally, (D-TX)
- Mills Godwin, (D-VA)
- Marvin Griffin, (D-GA)
- Allan Shivers, (D-TX)
- John Bell Williams, (D-MS)

Celebrities

- Jack Benny, comedian
- Joan Blondell, actress
- James Brown, singer
- Jim Brown, football player
- Ray Bolger, actor
- Nick Buoniconti, football player
- George Burns, comedian
- Glen Campbell, musician
- Wilt Chamberlain, basketball player
- Christopher Connelly, actor
- Sammy Davis Jr., singer and actor
- Zsa Zsa Gabor, actress
- Johnny Grant, radio personality
- Merv Griffin, television personality
- George Hamilton, actor
- Charlton Heston, actor
- Bob Hope, comedian
- Art Linkletter, radio personality
- Dick Martin, comedian
- Mary Tyler Moore, actress
- Merlin Olsen, football player
- Debbie Reynolds, actress
- Dan Rowan, actor
- Gale Sayers, football player
- Frank Sinatra, singer
- Red Skelton, entertainer
- James Stewart, actor
- Howard Twilley, football player
- John Wayne, actor

== Polling ==
=== National polling ===
| Poll source | Publication | John Ashbrook | Pete McCloskey | Richard Nixon |
|---|---|---|---|---|
| Gallup | Feb. 1972 | 5% | 6% | 83% |

== Overview of the race ==
Nixon was a popular incumbent president in 1972, as he seemed to have reached détente with China and the USSR. He easily brushed aside primary challengers and won reelection, though the Watergate scandal eventually unraveled his presidency, leading to his resignation in 1974.

Polls showed that Nixon had a strong lead. He was challenged by two minor candidates, liberal congressman Pete McCloskey of California and conservative congressman John Ashbrook of Ohio. McCloskey ran as an anti-Vietnam war candidate dedicated to a much more clearly liberal position compared to Nixon's ambiguity approach within the party, while Ashbrook was dedicated to a much more clearly conservative position than Nixon and opposed Nixon's détente policies towards China and the Soviet Union. In the New Hampshire primary, McCloskey's platform of peace garnered 19.7% of the vote to Nixon's 67.9%, with Ashbrook receiving 10.9% and comedian Pat Paulsen receiving 1.1%. Having previously stated that he would withdraw from the race had he not achieved 20% of the vote, McCloskey did so.

Nixon won 1,347 of the 1,348 delegates to the GOP convention, with McCloskey receiving the vote of one delegate from New Mexico.

== Timeline of the race ==
=== March 7 ===
1972 Republican Party primary in New Hampshire
| Candidate | Votes | % |
|---|---|---|
| Richard M. Nixon (incumbent) | 79,239 | 67.6 |
| Paul N. McCloskey | 23,190 | 19.8 |
| John M. Ashbrook | 11,362 | 9.7 |
| Others | 3,417 | 2.9 |
| Total votes | 117,208 | 100.0 |

=== March 14 ===
1972 Republican Party primary in Florida
| Candidate | Votes | % |
|---|---|---|
| Richard M. Nixon (incumbent) | 360,278 | 87 |
| John M. Ashbrook | 36,617 | 8.8 |
| Paul N. McCloskey | 17,312 | 4.2 |
| Total votes | 414,207 | 100 |

=== March 21 ===
1972 Republican Party primary in Illinois
| Candidate | Votes | % |
|---|---|---|
| Richard M. Nixon (incumbent) | 32,550 | 97 |
| John M. Ashbrook | 170 | 0.5 |
| Paul N. McCloskey | 47 | 0.1 |
| Others | 802 | 2.4 |
| Total votes | 33,569 | 100 |

=== April 4 ===
1972 Republican Party primary in Wisconsin
| Candidate | Votes | % |
|---|---|---|
| Richard M. Nixon (incumbent) | 277,601 | 96.9 |
| Paul N. McCloskey | 3,651 | 1.3 |
| John M. Ashbrook | 2,604 | 0.9 |
| "None of the names shown" | 2,315 | 0.8 |
| Others | 273 | 0.1 |
| Total votes | 286,444 | 100 |

=== April 25 ===
1972 Republican Party primary in Massachusetts
| Candidate | Votes | % |
|---|---|---|
| Richard M. Nixon (incumbent) | 99,150 | 81.2 |
| Paul N. McCloskey | 16,435 | 13.5 |
| John M. Ashbrook | 4,864 | 4 |
| Others | 1,690 | 1.4 |
| Total votes | 122,139 | 100 |

1972 Republican Party primary in Pennsylvania
| Candidate | Votes | % |
|---|---|---|
| Richard M. Nixon (incumbent) | 153,886 | 83.3 |
| George C. Wallace | 20,472 | 11.1 |
| Others | 10,443 | 5.7 |
| Total votes | 184,801 | 100 |

=== May 2 ===
1972 Republican Party primary in Indiana
| Candidate | Votes | % |
|---|---|---|
| Richard M. Nixon (incumbent) | 417,069 | 100 |
| Total votes | 417,069 | 100 |

1972 Republican Party primary in Ohio
| Candidate | Votes | % |
|---|---|---|
| Richard M. Nixon (incumbent) | 692,828 | 100 |
| Total votes | 692,828 | 100 |

=== May 4 ===
1972 Republican Party primary in Tennessee
| Candidate | Votes | % |
|---|---|---|
| Richard M. Nixon (incumbent) | 109,696 | 95.8 |
| John M. Ashbrook | 2,419 | 2.1 |
| Paul N. McCloskey | 2,370 | 2.1 |
| Others | 4 | 0 |
| Total votes | 114,489 | 100 |

=== May 6 ===
1972 Republican Party primary in North Carolina
| Candidate | Votes | % |
|---|---|---|
| Richard M. Nixon (incumbent) | 159,167 | 94.8 |
| Paul N. McCloskey | 8,732 | 5.2 |
| Total votes | 167,899 | 100 |

=== May 9 ===
1972 Republican Party primary in Nebraska
| Candidate | Votes | % |
|---|---|---|
| Richard M. Nixon (incumbent) | 179,464 | 92.4 |
| Paul N. McCloskey | 9,011 | 4.6 |
| John M. Ashbrook | 4,996 | 2.6 |
| Others | 801 | 0.4 |
| Total votes | 194,272 | 100 |

1972 Republican Party primary in West Virginia
| Candidate | Votes | % |
|---|---|---|
| Unpledged delegates at large | 95,813 | 100 |
| Total votes | 95,813 | 100 |

=== May 16 ===
1972 Republican Party primary in Maryland
| Candidate | Votes | % |
|---|---|---|
| Richard M. Nixon (incumbent) | 99,308 | 86.2 |
| Paul N. McCloskey | 9,223 | 8 |
| John M. Ashbrook | 6,718 | 5.8 |
| Total votes | 115,249 | 100 |

1972 Republican Party primary in Michigan
| Candidate | Votes | % |
|---|---|---|
| Richard M. Nixon (incumbent) | 321,652 | 95.5 |
| Paul N. McCloskey | 9,691 | 2.9 |
| Unpledged delegates | 5,370 | 1.6 |
| Others | 30 | 0 |
| Total votes | 336,743 | 100 |

=== May 23 ===
1972 Republican Party primary in Oregon
| Candidate | Votes | % |
|---|---|---|
| Richard M. Nixon (incumbent) | 231,151 | 82 |
| Paul N. McCloskey | 29,365 | 10.4 |
| John M. Ashbrook | 16,696 | 5.9 |
| Others | 4,798 | 1.7 |
| Total votes | 282,010 | 100 |

1972 Republican Party primary in Rhode Island
| Candidate | Votes | % |
|---|---|---|
| Richard M. Nixon (incumbent) | 4,953 | 88.3 |
| Paul N. McCloskey | 337 | 6 |
| John M. Ashbrook | 175 | 3.1 |
| Unpledged delegates at large | 146 | 2.6 |
| Total votes | 5,611 | 100 |

=== June 6 ===
1972 Republican Party primary in California
| Candidate | Votes | % |
|---|---|---|
| Richard M. Nixon (incumbent) | 2,058,825 | 90.1 |
| John M. Ashbrook | 224,922 | 9.8 |
| Others | 175 | 0 |
| Total votes | 2,283,922 | 100 |

1972 Republican Party primary in New Jersey
| Candidate | Votes | % |
|---|---|---|
| Unpledged delegates at large | 215,719 | 100 |
| Total votes | 215,719 | 100 |

1972 Republican Party primary in New Mexico
| Candidate | Votes | % |
|---|---|---|
| Richard M. Nixon (incumbent) | 49,067 | 88.5 |
| Paul N. McCloskey | 3,367 | 5.5 |
| "None of the names shown" | 3,035 | 5.5 |
| Total votes | 104,536 | 100 |

1972 Republican Party primary in South Dakota
| Candidate | Votes | % |
|---|---|---|
| Richard M. Nixon (incumbent) | 52,820 | 100 |
| Total votes | 52,820 | 100 |

== Results by popular vote ==
1972 Republican Party presidential primaries
| Candidate | Votes | % |
|---|---|---|
| Richard M. Nixon (incumbent) | 5,378,704 | 86.9 |
| Unpledged delegates | 317,048 | 5.1 |
| John M. Ashbrook | 311,543 | 5.0 |
| Paul N. McCloskey | 132,731 | 2.1 |
| George C. Wallace | 20,472 | 0.3 |
| "None of the names shown" | 5,350 | 0.1 |
| Others | 22,433 | 0.4 |
| Total votes | 6,188,281 | 100 |

== See also ==
- 1972 Democratic Party presidential primaries
