= B. F. Sisk =

American politician (1910–1995)

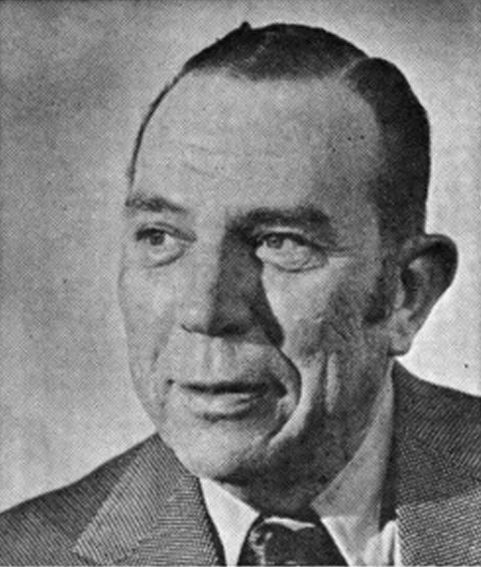

Member of the U.S. House of Representatives from California
- In office January 3, 1955 – January 3, 1979
- Preceded by: Allan O. Hunter
- Succeeded by: Tony Coelho
- Constituency: 12th district (1955–1963); 16th district (1963–1975); 15th district (1975–1979)

Personal details
- Born: Bernice Frederic Sisk; December 14, 1910 Montague, Texas, U.S.
- Died: October 25, 1995 (aged 84) Fresno, California, U.S.
- Party: Democratic
- Education: Abilene Christian University (attended)

Bernice Frederic Sisk (December 14, 1910 – October 25, 1995) was an American politician who served as a Congressman from California from 1955 to 1979. He was a member of the Democratic Party.

== Life and career ==
Sisk was born in 1910 in Montague, Texas, the son of Lavina (Thomas) and Arthur Lee Sisk.

=== Congress ===
He was elected to the House in 1954, representing a district that included Fresno, Merced and Modesto. He defeated Republican incumbent Oakley Hunter in one of the major upsets of the 1954 midterm Congressional elections. The district had been in Republican hands for all but ten years since its creation in 1913, but Sisk went on to hold the seat for 12 terms. The district would remain in Democratic hands until the election of Republican John Duarte to Congress in 2022.

Sisk was a long-time member of the House Rules Committee and the Agriculture Committee, and served as Chairman of the Cotton Subcommittee, where he helped heal the long-standing rift between southern and western cotton producers. A proponent of production inducements rather than direct farm subsidies, he backed legislation to aid the dairy, wine, sugar, fig and raisin industries.

Sisk was also a major political force in the United States Congress pushing for the creation of the Central Valley Project which eventually developed into a $37 billion water supply system that serves California's Central Valley. The B.F. Sisk Dam in Merced County, built in the 1960s, and more commonly known as the San Luis Dam, is named for him.

Sisk retired from Congress in 1978. He was succeeded by his former chief of staff, Tony Coelho.

== Affiliations ==
B. F. Sisk was a member of the Palm Avenue Church of Christ in Fresno.

== Death ==
Sisk died in Fresno on October 25, 1995.

== Electoral history ==
California's 12th congressional district: Results 1954-1960
Year	Subject	Party	Votes	%	Opponent	Party	Votes	%
1954	B. F. Sisk	Democratic	63,911	53.79	A. Oakley Hunter (inc.)	Republican	54,903	46.21
1956	B. F. Sisk (inc.)	Democratic	69,300	73.00	Robert B. Moore	Republican	40,663	27.00
1958	B. F. Sisk (inc.)	Democratic	112,702	81.12	Daniel K. Halpin	Republican	26,228	18.88
1960	B. F. Sisk (inc.)	Democratic	141,974	99.91	Others (write-in)	N/A	126	0.09

California's 16th congressional district: Results 1962-1972
Year	Subject	Party	Votes	%	Opponent	Party	Votes	%
1962	B. F. Sisk (inc.)	Democratic	108,339	71.87	Arthur L. Selland	Republican	42,401	28.13
1964	B. F. Sisk (inc.)	Democratic	117,727	66.77	David T. "Dave" Harris	Republican	58,604	33.24
1966	B. F. Sisk (inc.)	Democratic	118,063	71.38	Cecil F. White	Republican	47,329	28.62
1968	B. F. Sisk (inc.)	Democratic	97,476	62.46	David T. "Dave" Harris	Republican	55,188	35.36
1970	B. F. Sisk (inc.)	Democratic	95,118	66.42	Phillip V. Sanchez	Republican	43,843	30.62
1972	B. F. Sisk (inc.)	Democratic	134,132	79.13	Carol Harner	Republican	35,385	20.87

California's 15th congressional district: Results 1974-1976
Year	Subject	Party	Votes	%	Opponent	Party	Votes	%
1974	B. F. Sisk (inc.)	Democratic	80,897	72.01	Carol Harner	Republican	31,439	27.99
1976	B. F. Sisk (inc.)	Democratic	92,735	72.20	Carol Harner	Republican	35,700	27.80

U.S. House of Representatives
Preceded by Allan O. Hunter	Member of the U.S. House of Representatives from California's 12th congressional district 1955–1963	Succeeded by Burt Talcott
Preceded by Alphonzo E. Bell Jr.	Member of the U.S. House of Representatives from California's 16th congressional district 1963–1975	Succeeded by Burt Talcott
Preceded by John J. McFall	Member of the U.S. House of Representatives from California's 15th congressional district 1975–1979	Succeeded by Tony Coelho
