= Jean Spencer Ashbrook =

American politician (born 1934)

Jean Ashbrook
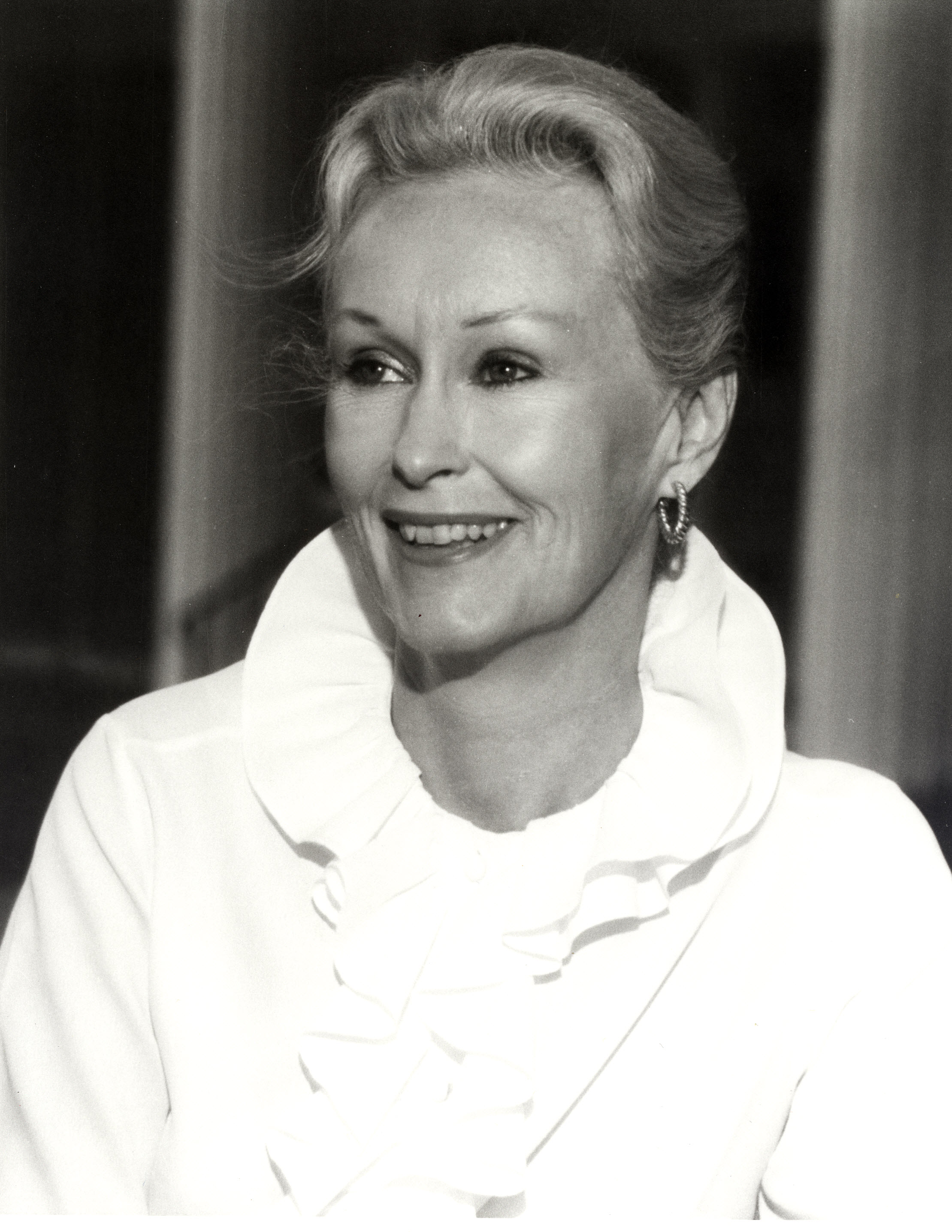

Member of the U.S. House of Representatives from Ohio's 17th district
- In office June 29, 1982 – January 3, 1983
- Preceded by: John M. Ashbrook
- Succeeded by: Lyle Williams

Personal details
- Born: Emily Jean Spencer; September 21, 1934 (age 92) Newark, Ohio, U.S.
- Party: Republican
- Spouse: John M. Ashbrook (m. 1974; died 1982)
- Education: Ohio State University (BS)

Emily Jean Ashbrook (née Spencer; born September 21, 1934) is a former American politician. She is the widow of Congressman John M. Ashbrook, a Republican from Ohio. She then completed her late husband's final term of office, also as a Republican.

== Biography ==
Ashbrook was born Emily Jean Spencer on September 21, 1934, in Cincinnati, Ohio. She attended Central School in Newark, Ohio, and graduated from Newark High School in 1952. She went on to graduate with a bachelor's degree from Ohio State University, where she was a member of Kappa Alpha Theta, in 1956.

=== Congress ===
She married John M. Ashbrook in 1974. After her husband's death on April 24, 1982, she won the special election for the seat in Congress he had occupied. She served for the remainder of the 97th Congress and represented Ohio's 17th congressional district from June 29, 1982 to January 3, 1983. Because the district was eliminated by reapportionment after January 1983, the district no longer existed.

Her election brought the total number of women appointed to the House of Representatives to 20 for the first time.

During her term, her only ambition was "to carry on John's conservative philosophy." She was a supporter of the Reagan administration and served on the Committee on Merchant Marine and Fisheries. She did speak out for her views including introducing a bill that would have denied federal law enforcement jurisdiction to implement gun control ordinances; a bill to prescribe mandatory minimum sentences for federal felonies against senior citizens; supported the Enterprise Zone Tax Act of 1982; and backed a bill to educate citizens on the dangers of communism and promote democracy abroad.

She currently resides in Newark, Ohio.

== See also ==
- List of United States representatives from Ohio
- Women in the United States House of Representatives

U.S. House of Representatives
Preceded by John M. Ashbrook	Member of the U.S. House of Representatives from Ohio's 17th congressional district 1982–1983	Succeeded by Lyle Williams
U.S. order of precedence (ceremonial)
Preceded by George Santos as Former U.S. Representative	Order of precedence of the United States as Former U.S. Representative	Succeeded by Don Cazayoux as Former U.S. Representative
