= Bertrand W. Gearhart =

American lawyer and politician (1890–1955)

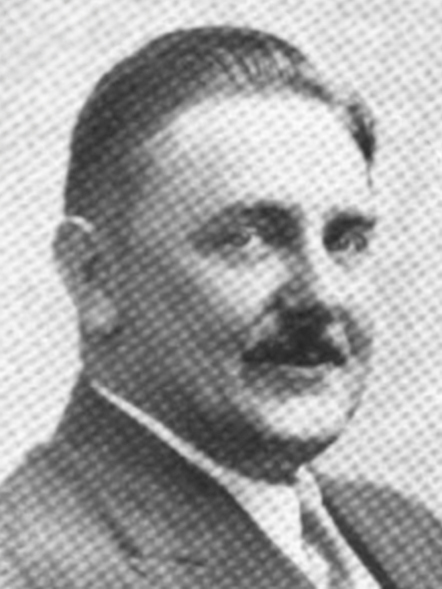

Member of the U.S. House of Representatives from California's 9th district
- In office January 3, 1935 – January 3, 1949
- Preceded by: Denver S. Church
- Succeeded by: Cecil F. White

Personal details
- Born: Bertrand Wesley Gearhart; May 31, 1890 Fresno, California
- Died: October 11, 1955 (aged 65) San Francisco, California
- Resting place: Mountain View Cemetery
- Party: Republican

Bertrand Wesley "Bud" Gearhart (May 31, 1890 – October 11, 1955) was an American lawyer and politician. Gearhart, a Republican, served seven terms as the United States representative for California's 9th congressional district from 1935 to 1949.

== Background ==
Gearhart was born the son of John Wesley Gearhart and Mary Elizabeth Johnson Gearhart in Fresno, California on May 31, 1890. After attending public school in Fresno, he went on to Boone's University School in Berkeley, California and graduated from there in 1910. He then went to University of Southern California Law School to obtain his Bachelor of Laws degree, which he completed in 1914. While he was there, Gearhart was a member of Phi Delta Phi and Zeta Psi fraternities.

== Career ==
Gearhart was admitted to the California state bar the previous year, and had commenced his law practice in Fresno. During World War I, he served overseas as a second lieutenant in the 609th Aero Squadron from 1917 to 1919. Gearhart was one of the founders of the American Legion, an organization of war veterans, in 1919. After the war, he first served as the assistant district attorney, and later the district attorney of Fresno County until 1923. In 1932, he served as a member of the board of directors of the California Veterans' Home.

=== Congress ===
A year later, Gearhart ran for the United States House of Representatives seat in California's 9th congressional district for the 74th United States Congress. Democratic incumbent Denver S. Church was not a candidate for renomination in 1934, and so Gearhart ran unopposed in the election. He captured all 77,650 votes cast in the election. Gearhart ran unopposed and captured nearly 100% of the vote in 1936, 1938, 1940, 1942 and 1944. In Congress, he was known as being a staunch Republican conservative, and as Harry S. Truman said, Gearhart was "one of the worst obstructionists in Congress". Gearhart was one of the few strong supporters of the Merchant Seamen's Bill of Rights. He faced his first Democratic challenger in the 1946 United States House elections when he was put up against Democrat Hubert Phillips. Gearhart defeated Phillips in the election, capturing 53.7% of the votes cast, in comparison to Phillips' 46.3%.

In a personal jab at Gearhart, President Truman said, "You have got a terrible Congressman here. He has done everything he possibly could do to cut the throats of the farmer and the laboring man." Months later, Gearhart was beaten in the 1948 House elections by a political newcomer, 47-year-old Democratic cotton rancher Cecil F. White, with the seven-term representative obtaining only 46.9% of the vote while White received 51.3%.

=== Later career ===
After losing the election, Gearhart went back to Fresno to resume his law practice until his death.

== Electoral results ==
United States House of Representatives elections, 1934
Party	Candidate	Votes	%
Republican	Bertrand W. Gearhart	77,650	100.0
Turnout			
Republican gain from Democratic			

United States House of Representatives elections, 1936
Party	Candidate	Votes	%
Republican	Bertrand W. Gearhart (Incumbent)	82,360	97
Communist	Carl B. Patterson	2,571	3
Total votes		84,931	100
Turnout			
Republican hold			

United States House of Representatives elections, 1938
Party	Candidate	Votes	%
Republican	Bertrand W. Gearhart (Incumbent)	91,128	96.3
No party	George H. Sciaroni (write-in)	3,536	3.7
Total votes		94,664	100.0
Turnout			
Republican hold			

United States House of Representatives elections, 1940
Party	Candidate	Votes	%
Republican	Bertrand W. Gearhart (Incumbent)	99,708	100.0
Turnout			
Republican hold			

United States House of Representatives elections, 1942
Party	Candidate	Votes	%
Republican	Bertrand W. Gearhart (Incumbent)	65,791	100.0
Turnout			
Republican hold			

United States House of Representatives elections, 1944
Party	Candidate	Votes	%
Republican	Bertrand W. Gearhart (Incumbent)	66,845	100.0
Turnout			
Republican hold			

United States House of Representatives elections, 1946
Party	Candidate	Votes	%
Republican	Bertrand W. Gearhart (Incumbent)	50,171	53.7
Democratic	Hubert Phillips	43,244	46.3
Total votes		93,415	100.0
Turnout			
Republican hold			

United States House of Representatives elections, 1948
Party	Candidate	Votes	%
Democratic	Cecil F. White	72,826	51.3
Republican	Bertrand W. Gearhart (Incumbent)	66,563	46.9
Progressive	Josephine F. Daniels	2,573	1.8
Total votes		141,962	100.0
Turnout			
Democratic gain from Republican			

== Personal life and death ==
Bertrand W. Gearhart died age 65 on October 11, 1955, in a San Francisco hospital. He was then interred in Mountain View Cemetery in Fresno.

U.S. House of Representatives
Preceded by Denver S. Church	Member of the U.S. House of Representatives from California's 9th congressional district 1935 - 1949	Succeeded by Cecil F. White
