= 1940 United States House of Representatives elections =

House elections for the 77th U.S. Congress

- November 5, 1940 (Note: September 9, 1940, in Maine)

All 435 seats in the United States House of Representatives 218 seats needed for a majority
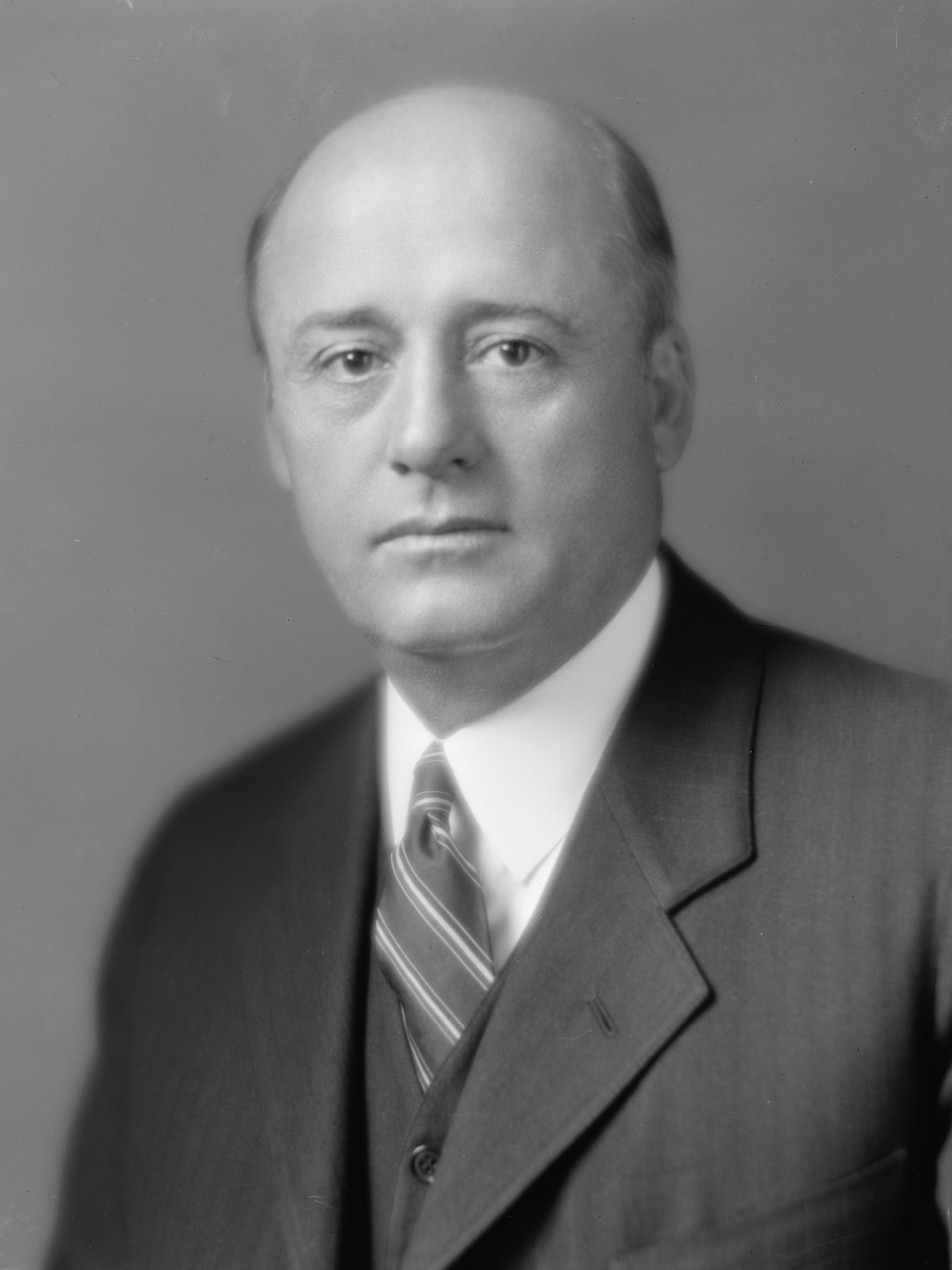

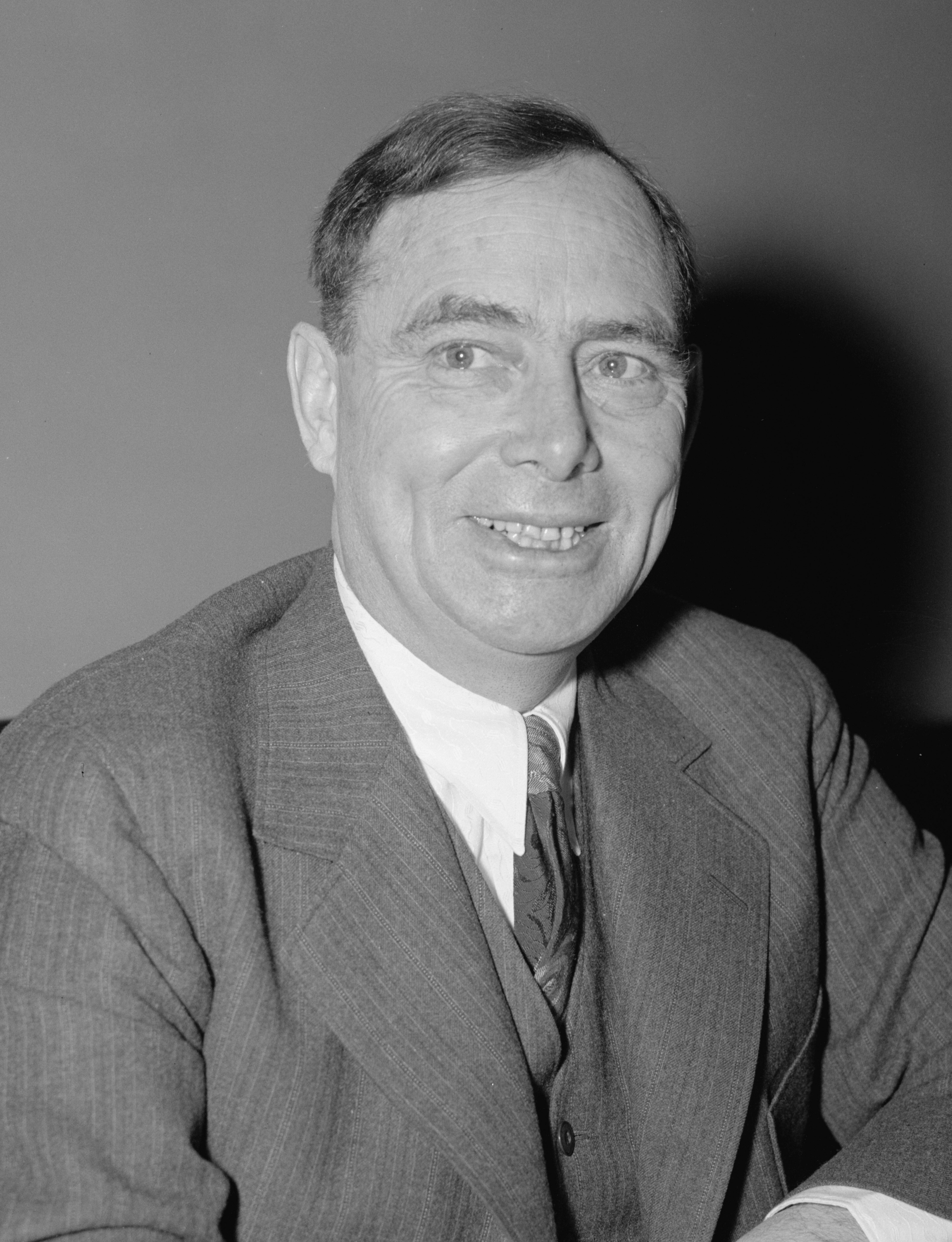
	Majority party	Minority party
Leader	Sam Rayburn	Joseph Martin
Party	Democratic	Republican
Leader since	September 16, 1940	January 3, 1939
Leader's seat	Texas 4th	Massachusetts 14th
Last election	262 seats	169 seats
Seats won	267	162
Seat change	▲5	▼7
Popular vote	24,227,821	21,490,392
Percentage	51.4%	45.6%
Swing	▲2.7pp	▼1.9pp
	Third party	Fourth party
Party	Progressive	American Labor
Last election	2 seats	1 seat
Seats won	3	1
Seat change	▲1	Steady
Popular vote	477,435	338,770
Percentage	1.0%	0.7%
Swing	Steady	Steady
	Fifth party	Sixth party
Party	Farmer–Labor	Independent
Last election	1 seat	0 seats
Seats won	1	1
Seat change	Steady	▲1
Popular vote	298,250	113,497
Percentage	0.6%	0.2%
Swing	▼0.3pp	Steady
Speaker before election
Sam Rayburn
Democratic
Elected Speaker
Sam Rayburn
Democratic

The 1940 United States House of Representatives elections were elections for the United States House of Representatives to elect members to serve in the 77th United States Congress. They were held for the most part on November 5, 1940, while Maine held theirs on September 9. They coincided with President Franklin D. Roosevelt's re-election to an unprecedented third term. His Democratic Party narrowly gained seats from the opposition Republican Party, cementing their majority. However, the election gave firm control of the US House of Representatives and Senate to the New Dealers once again, as Progressives dominated the election.

The upswing in the economy that occurred following the Recession of 1937–38 encouraged voters that the New Deal plan had been working. This allowed the Democrats to stabilize their support.

As of 2026, this was the last time the House of Representatives was made up of six parties.

== Overall results ==
↓
267	6	162
Democratic	(Note: There were 1 Independent, 1 Labor, 1 Farmer–Labor, and 3 Progressive.)	Republican

Party	Total seats (change)		Seat percentage	Vote percentage	Popular vote
Democratic Party	267	▲5	61.3%	51.4%	24,227,821
Republican Party	162	▼7	37.2%	45.6%	21,490,392
Progressive Party	3	▲1	0.6%	1.0%	477,435
American Labor Party	1	Steady	0.2%	0.7%	338,770
Farmer–Labor Party	1	Steady	0.2%	0.6%	298,250
Independents	1	▲1	0.2%	0.2%	113,497
Communist Party	0	Steady	0.0%	0.2%	95,173
Prohibition Party	0	Steady	0.0%	0.1%	62,504
Socialist Party	0	Steady	0.0%	<0.1%	19,782
Socialist Labor Party	0	Steady	0.0%	<0.1%	6,403
Union Party	0	Steady	0.8%	<0.1%	6,401
Liberal Party	0	Steady	0.0%	<0.1%	2,256
Fusion Party	0	Steady	0.0%	<0.1%	2,014
No Wage Tax Party	0	Steady	0.0%	<0.1%	864
Workers Party	0	Steady	0.0%	<0.1%	411
Buono Food Plan Party	0	Steady	0.0%	<0.1%	375
Peace Party	0	Steady	0.0%	<0.1%	341
States' Rights Party	0	Steady	0.0%	<0.1%	270
Keep America Neutral Party	0	Steady	0.0%	<0.1%	128
Roosevelt New Deal Party	0	Steady	0.0%	<0.1%	98
The American Way Party	0	Steady	0.0%	<0.1%	65
Others	0	Steady	0.0%	<0.1%	5,578
Totals	435	Steady	100.0%	100.0%	47,144,845

Source: Election Statistics - Office of the Clerk

Popular vote
American Labor	0.72%
Democratic	51.39%
Farmer–Labor	0.63%
Progressive	1.01%
Republican	45.58%
Others	0.65%

House seats
American Labor	0.23%
Democratic	61.38%
Farmer–Labor	0.23%
Progressive	0.69%
Republican	37.24%
Others	0.23%

Results shaded according to winning candidate's share of the popular vote

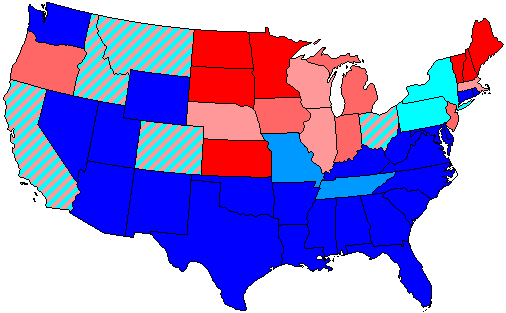
House seats by party holding plurality in state: 80%+ Republican / 80%+ Democratic; 60%+ to 80% Republican / 60%+ to 80% Democratic; Up to 60% Republican / Up to 60% Democratic

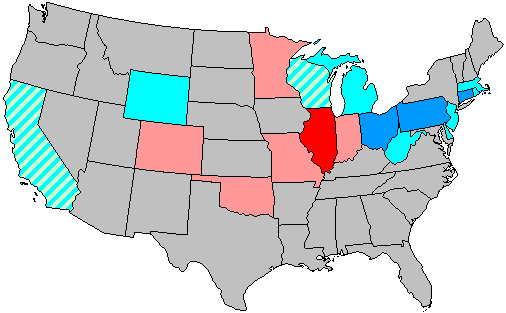
Net gain in states: 6+ Democratic gain / 6+ Republican gain; 3–5 Democratic gain / 3–5 Republican gain; 1–2 Democratic gain / 1–2 Republican gain; 1-2 Progressive gain no net change

== Special elections ==
Many special elections were held. The elected winner would serve only the remainder of the incumbent Congress. Sorted by election date.

District	Incumbent			This race	
District	Member	Party	First elected	Results	Candidates
New York 14	William I. Sirovich	Democratic	1926	Incumbent died December 17, 1939. New member elected February 6, 1940. Democratic hold. Winner was later re-elected to the next term; see below.	▌ ✓ Morris Michael Edelstein (Democratic) 57.08%; ▌Louis J. Lefkowitz (Republican) 29.35%; ▌Earl Browder (Communist) 13.56%
New York 31	Wallace E. Pierce	Republican	1938	Incumbent died January 3, 1940. New member elected February 13, 1940. Republican hold. Winner was later re-elected to the next term; see below.	▌ ✓ Clarence E. Kilburn (Republican) 70.26%; ▌ M. Henry McGillic (Democratic) 29.74%
Tennessee 9	Walter Chandler	Democratic	1934	Incumbent resigned January 2, 1940. New member elected February 15, 1940. Democratic hold. Winner was later re-elected to the next term; see below.	▌ ✓ Clifford Davis (Democratic) 93.5%; ▌Ralph A. Picard (Democratic) 4.78%; ▌Tom Collier (Independent) 1.60%; ▌Theodore W. Larwill (Independent) 0.11%
Michigan 5	Carl Mapes	Republican	1912	Incumbent died December 12, 1939. New member elected February 19, 1940. Republican hold. Winner was later re-elected to the next term; see below.	▌ ✓ Bartel J. Jonkman (Republican) 58.61%; ▌William R. McCaslin (Democratic) 41.39%
New York 22	Edward W. Curley	Democratic	1934	Incumbent died January 6, 1940. New member elected February 20, 1940. Democratic hold. Winner was later re-elected to the next term; see below.	▌ ✓ Walter A. Lynch (Democratic) 89.06%; ▌Arthur D. Fisher (Republican) 10.94%
Ohio 17	William A. Ashbrook	Democratic	1906; 1920 (lost); 1934	Incumbent died January 1, 1940. New member elected February 27, 1940. Republican gain. Winner was later re-elected to the next term; see below.	▌ ✓ J. Harry McGregor (Republican) 54.48%; ▌Byron Ashbrook (Democratic) 45.52%
Ohio 22	Chester C. Bolton	Republican	1928; 1936 (lost); 1938	Incumbent died October 29, 1939. New member elected February 27, 1940. Republican hold. Winner was later re-elected to the next term; see below.	▌ ✓ Frances P. Bolton (Republican) 62.69%; ▌Anthony A. Fleger (Democratic) 37.31%
Iowa 6	Cassius C. Dowell	Republican	1936	Incumbent died February 4, 1940. New member elected March 5, 1940. Republican hold. Winner was later re-elected to the next term; see below.	▌ ✓ Robert K. Goodwin (Republican) 60.28%; ▌Bryan Allen (Democratic) 38.93%
Nebraska 1	George H. Heinke	Republican	1938	Incumbent died January 2, 1940. New member elected April 19, 1940. Republican hold. Winner did not run for election to the next term; see below.	▌ ✓ John Hyde Sweet (Republican) 56.15%; ▌Charles A. Dafoe (Democratic) 43.85%
Maine 2	Clyde H. Smith	Republican	1936	Incumbent died April 8, 1940. New member elected June 3, 1940. Republican hold. Winner was later re-elected to the next term; see below.	▌ ✓ Margaret Chase Smith (Republican); Uncontested
Georgia 8	W. Benjamin Gibbs	Democratic	1938	Incumbent died August 7, 1940. New member elected October 1, 1940. Democratic hold. Winner did not run for election to the next term; see below.	▌ ✓ Florence Reville Gibbs (Democratic); Uncontested
Alabama 7	William B. Bankhead	Democratic	1916	Incumbent died September 15, 1940. New member elected November 5, 1940. Democratic hold. Winner did not run for election to the next term; see below.	▌ ✓ Zadoc L. Weatherford (Democratic); Uncontested
Colorado 3	John Andrew Martin	Democratic	1908; 1912 (retired); 1932	Incumbent died December 23, 1939. New member elected November 5, 1940. Democratic hold. Winner did not run for election to the next term; see below.	▌ ✓ William E. Burney (Democratic) 51.0%; ▌Henry Leonard (Republican) 49.1%

== Alabama ==
District	Incumbent			This race	
District	Member	Party	First elected	Results	Candidates
Alabama 1	Frank W. Boykin	Democratic	1935 (special)	Incumbent re-elected.	▌ ✓ Frank W. Boykin (Democratic); Uncontested
Alabama 2	George M. Grant	Democratic	1938	Incumbent re-elected.	▌ ✓ George M. Grant (Democratic); Uncontested
Alabama 3	Henry B. Steagall	Democratic	1914	Incumbent re-elected.	▌ ✓ Henry B. Steagall (Democratic) 99.6%; ▌Thomas G. McNaron (Republican) 0.4%
Alabama 4	Sam Hobbs	Democratic	1934	Incumbent re-elected.	▌ ✓ Sam Hobbs (Democratic) 87.9%; ▌Thomas G. McNaron (Republican) 12.1%
Alabama 5	Joe Starnes	Democratic	1934	Incumbent re-elected.	▌ ✓ Joe Starnes (Democratic) 100.0%
Alabama 6	Pete Jarman	Democratic	1936	Incumbent re-elected.	▌ ✓ Pete Jarman (Democratic); Uncontested
Alabama 7	William B. Bankhead	Democratic	1916	Incumbent died September 15, 1940. Democratic hold.	▌ ✓ Walter W. Bankhead (Democratic) 70.9%; ▌A. W. Hargett (Republican) 29.1%
Alabama 8	John Sparkman	Democratic	1936	Incumbent re-elected.	▌ ✓ John Sparkman (Democratic); Uncontested
Alabama 9	Luther Patrick	Democratic	1936	Incumbent re-elected.	▌ ✓ Luther Patrick (Democratic) 99.1%; ▌W. A. Denson (Independent) 0.9%

== Arizona ==
Results by county Murdock: 60–70% 70–80% 80–90%

District	Incumbent			This race	
District	Member	Party	First elected	Results	Candidates
Arizona at-large	John R. Murdock	Democratic	1936	Incumbent re-elected.	▌ ✓ John R. Murdock (Democratic) 71.1%; ▌K. T. Palmer (Republican) 28.9%

== Arkansas ==
District	Incumbent			This race	
District	Member	Party	First elected	Results	Candidates
Arkansas 1	Ezekiel C. Gathings	Democratic	1938	Incumbent re-elected.	▌ ✓ Ezekiel C. Gathings (Democratic); Uncontested
Arkansas 2	Wilbur Mills	Democratic	1938	Incumbent re-elected.	▌ ✓ Wilbur Mills (Democratic); Uncontested
Arkansas 3	Clyde T. Ellis	Democratic	1938	Incumbent re-elected.	▌ ✓ Clyde T. Ellis (Democratic) 71.1%; ▌Claude M. Williams (Republican) 28.9%
Arkansas 4	William Fadjo Cravens	Democratic	1939 (special)	Incumbent re-elected.	▌ ✓ William Fadjo Cravens (Democratic); Uncontested
Arkansas 5	David D. Terry	Democratic	1933 (special)	Incumbent re-elected.	▌ ✓ David D. Terry (Democratic); Uncontested
Arkansas 6	William F. Norrell	Democratic	1938	Incumbent re-elected.	▌ ✓ William F. Norrell (Democratic); Uncontested
Arkansas 7	Wade H. Kitchens	Democratic	1936	Incumbent lost renomination. Democratic hold.	▌ ✓ Oren Harris (Democratic); Uncontested

== California ==
District	Incumbent			This race	
District	Member	Party	First elected	Results	Candidates
California 1	Clarence F. Lea	Democratic	1916	Incumbent re-elected.	▌ ✓ Clarence F. Lea (Democratic) 93.3%; ▌Albert J. Lima (Communist) 5.1%; ▌Ernest S. Mitchell (Write-in) 1.6%
California 2	Harry Lane Englebright	Republican	1926	Incumbent re-elected.	▌ ✓ Harry Lane Englebright (Republican); Uncontested
California 3	Frank H. Buck	Democratic	1932	Incumbent re-elected.	▌ ✓ Frank H. Buck (Democratic) 91.0%; ▌C. H. Farman (Prohibition) 7.1%; ▌Charles Gricus (Communist) 1.8%
California 4	Franck R. Havenner	Democratic	1936	Incumbent lost re-election. Republican gain.	▌ ✓ Thomas Rolph (Republican) 54.6%; ▌Franck R. Havenner (Democratic) 44.4%; ▌Archie Brown (Communist) 1.0%
California 5	Richard J. Welch	Republican	1926	Incumbent re-elected.	▌ ✓ Richard J. Welch (Republican) 95.8%; ▌Walter R. Lambert (Communist) 4.2%
California 6	Albert E. Carter	Republican	1924	Incumbent re-elected.	▌ ✓ Albert E. Carter (Republican) 96.0%; ▌Clarence Paton (Communist) 4.0%
California 7	John H. Tolan	Democratic	1934	Incumbent re-elected.	▌ ✓ John H. Tolan (Democratic) 55.5%; ▌Ralph R. Eltse (Republican) 43.2%; ▌Alfred N. Johnson (Communist) 1.3%
California 8	Jack Z. Anderson	Republican	1938	Incumbent re-elected.	▌ ✓ Jack Z. Anderson (Republican) 96.6%; ▌Elizabeth Nicholas (Communist) 3.4%; ▌John J. McGrath (Write-in) 0.02%
California 9	Bertrand W. Gearhart	Republican	1934	Incumbent re-elected.	▌ ✓ Bertrand W. Gearhart (Republican); Uncontested
California 10	Alfred J. Elliott	Democratic	1937 (special)	Incumbent re-elected.	▌ ✓ Alfred J. Elliott (Democratic) 97.0%; ▌Louretta Adams (Communist) 3.0%
California 11	John Carl Hinshaw	Republican	1938	Incumbent re-elected.	▌ ✓ John Carl Hinshaw (Republican) 96.6%; ▌Orla E. Lair (Communist) 3.4%
California 12	Jerry Voorhis	Democratic	1936	Incumbent re-elected.	▌ ✓ Jerry Voorhis (Democratic) 64.0%; ▌Irwin W. Minger (Republican) 35.2%; ▌Albert Lewis (Communist) 0.7%
California 13	Charles Kramer	Democratic	1932	Incumbent re-elected.	▌ ✓ Charles Kramer (Democratic) 75.7%; ▌Charles Hiram Randall (Prohibition) 21.7%; ▌Celeste Strack (Communist) 2.6%
California 14	Thomas F. Ford	Democratic	1932	Incumbent re-elected.	▌ ✓ Thomas F. Ford (Democratic) 64.3%; ▌Herbert L. Herberts (Republican) 33.3%; ▌Pettis Perry (Communist) 2.4%
California 15	John M. Costello	Democratic	1934	Incumbent re-elected.	▌ ✓ John M. Costello (Democratic) 56.2%; ▌Norris J. Nelson (Republican) 42.6%; ▌Emil Freed (Communist) 1.2%
California 16	Leland M. Ford	Republican	1938	Incumbent re-elected.	▌ ✓ Leland M. Ford (Republican) 96.4%; ▌George C. Sandy (Communist) 3.6%
California 17	Lee E. Geyer	Democratic	1938	Incumbent re-elected.	▌ ✓ Lee E. Geyer (Democratic) 65.5%; ▌Clifton A. Hix (Republican) 28.6%; ▌Samuel C. Converse (Progressive) 4.9%; ▌Harry L. Gray (Communist) 1.0%
California 18	Thomas M. Eaton	Republican	1938	Incumbent died September 16, 1939. Republican hold.	▌ ✓ William Ward Johnson (Republican) 54.3%; ▌Byron N. Scott (Democratic) 44.7%; ▌George R. Ashby (Communist) 1.0%
California 19	Harry R. Sheppard	Democratic	1936	Incumbent re-elected.	▌ ✓ Harry R. Sheppard (Democratic) 52.9%; ▌Lotus H. Loudon (Republican) 47.1%
California 20	Edouard Izac	Democratic	1936	Incumbent re-elected.	▌ ✓ Edouard Izac (Democratic) 51.1%; ▌Ed Fletcher (Republican) 48.3%; ▌Esco L. Richardson (Communist) 0.6%

== Colorado ==
District	Incumbent			This race	
District	Member	Party	First elected	Results	Candidates
Colorado 1	Lawrence Lewis	Democratic	1932	Incumbent re-elected.	▌ ✓ Lawrence Lewis (Democratic) 64.6%; ▌James D. Parriott (Republican) 34.9%; ▌Ward Rogers (Socialist) 0.3%; ▌James Allander (Communist) 0.2%
Colorado 2	Fred N. Cummings	Democratic	1932	Incumbent lost re-election. Republican gain.	▌ ✓ William S. Hill (Republican) 53.2%; ▌Fred N. Cummings (Democratic) 46.2%; ▌Henry Neumann (Socialist) 0.3%; ▌Robert F. Billings (Peace) 0.2%
Colorado 3	John Andrew Martin	Democratic	1932	Incumbent died December 23, 1939. Republican gain. Winner did not run to finish the current term.	▌ ✓ John Chenoweth (Republican) 52.0%; ▌Byron G. Rogers (Democratic) 48.0%
Colorado 4	Edward T. Taylor	Democratic	1908	Incumbent re-elected.	▌ ✓ Edward T. Taylor (Democratic) 59.4%; ▌Paul W. Crawford (Republican) 40.6%

== Connecticut ==
District	Incumbent			This race	
District	Member	Party	First elected	Results	Candidates
Connecticut 1	William J. Miller	Republican	1938	Incumbent lost re-election. Democratic gain.	▌ ✓ Herman P. Kopplemann (Democratic) 54.2%; ▌William J. Miller (Republican) 45.8%
Connecticut 2	Thomas R. Ball	Republican	1938	Incumbent lost re-election. Democratic gain.	▌ ✓ William J. Fitzgerald (Democratic) 52.4%; ▌Thomas R. Ball (Republican) 47.3%; ▌John R. McHale (Socialist) 0.3%
Connecticut 3	James A. Shanley	Democratic	1934	Incumbent re-elected.	▌ ✓ James A. Shanley (Democratic) 53.6%; ▌Ranulf Compton (Republican) 46.4%
Connecticut 4	Albert E. Austin	Republican	1938	Incumbent lost re-election. Democratic gain.	▌ ✓ Le Roy D. Downs (Democratic) 49.1%; ▌Albert E. Austin (Republican) 48.6%; ▌George Moffatt (Socialist) 2.3%
Connecticut 5	J. Joseph Smith	Democratic	1934	Incumbent re-elected.	▌ ✓ J. Joseph Smith (Democratic) 54.9%; ▌Frank T. Johnson (Republican) 44.7%; ▌John W. Ring (Socialist) 0.4%
Connecticut at-large	B. J. Monkiewicz	Republican	1938	Incumbent lost re-election. Democratic gain.	▌ ✓ Lucien J. Maciora (Democratic) 52.1%; ▌B. J. Monkiewicz (Republican) 46.7%; ▌Bellani Trombley (Socialist) 0.8%; ▌Andrew Jacob Jr. (Socialist Labor) 0.2%; ▌Oscar W. Nelson (Union) 0.1%

== Delaware ==
District	Incumbent			This race	
District	Member	Party	First elected	Results	Candidates
Delaware at-large	George S. Williams	Republican	1938	Incumbent lost re-election. Democratic gain.	▌ ✓ Philip A. Traynor (Democratic) 50.6%; ▌George S. Williams (Republican) 47.8%; ▌Royden C. Caulk (Liberal Dem.) 1.6%

== Florida ==
District	Incumbent			This race	
District	Member	Party	First elected	Results	Candidates
Florida 1	J. Hardin Peterson	Democratic	1932	Incumbent re-elected.	▌ ✓ J. Hardin Peterson (Democratic); Uncontested
Florida 2	Robert A. Green	Democratic	1932	Incumbent re-elected.	▌ ✓ Robert A. Green (Democratic) 89.1%; ▌Francis McHale (Republican) 10.9%
Florida 3	Millard Caldwell	Democratic	1932	Incumbent retired to run for U.S. senator. Democratic hold.	▌ ✓ Bob Sikes (Democratic); Uncontested
Florida 4	Pat Cannon	Democratic	1938	Incumbent re-elected.	▌ ✓ Pat Cannon (Democratic) 75.3%; ▌Bert L. Acker (Republican) 24.7%
Florida 5	Joe Hendricks	Democratic	1936	Incumbent re-elected.	▌ ✓ Joe Hendricks (Democratic) 75.4%; ▌Emory Akerman (Republican) 24.6%

== Georgia ==
District	Incumbent			This race	
District	Member	Party	First elected	Results	Candidates
Georgia 1	Hugh Peterson	Democratic	1934	Incumbent re-elected.	▌ ✓ Hugh Peterson (Democratic) 99.5%; ▌H. W. Sheppard (Independent) 0.4%; ▌Thomas H. Gignilliat (Republican) 0.1%
Georgia 2	Edward E. Cox	Democratic	1924	Incumbent re-elected.	▌ ✓ Edward E. Cox (Democratic) 96.8%; ▌William Campbell (Independent) 3.2%
Georgia 3	Stephen Pace	Democratic	1936	Incumbent re-elected.	▌ ✓ Stephen Pace (Democratic); Uncontested
Georgia 4	Albert Sidney Camp	Democratic	1939 (special)	Incumbent re-elected.	▌ ✓ Albert Sidney Camp (Democratic); Uncontested
Georgia 5	Robert Ramspeck	Democratic	1929	Incumbent re-elected.	▌ ✓ Robert Ramspeck (Democratic) 99.9%; ▌Henry A. Alexander (Republican) 0.1%
Georgia 6	Carl Vinson	Democratic	1914	Incumbent re-elected.	▌ ✓ Carl Vinson (Democratic) 99.9%; ▌Mrs. J. Ben Warren (Republican) 0.1%
Georgia 7	Malcolm C. Tarver	Democratic	1926	Incumbent re-elected.	▌ ✓ Malcolm C. Tarver (Democratic) 86.4%; ▌Lewis H. Crawford (Republican) 13.6%; ▌Norman Thomas (Independent) 0.005%
Georgia 8	Florence Reville Gibbs	Democratic	1940	Incumbent retired. Democratic hold.	▌ ✓ John S. Gibson (Democratic); Uncontested
Georgia 9	B. Frank Whelchel	Democratic	1934	Incumbent re-elected.	▌ ✓ B. Frank Whelchel (Democratic) 84.4%; ▌William C. Horton (Republican) 15.4%; ▌W. H. Slack Jr. (Independent) 0.2%
Georgia 10	Paul Brown	Democratic	1933 (special)	Incumbent re-elected.	▌ ✓ Paul Brown (Democratic) 98.7%; ▌D. Talmadge Bowers (Independent) 1.3%; ▌G. P. King (Independent) 0.01%

== Idaho ==
District	Incumbent			This race	
District	Member	Party	First elected	Results	Candidates
Idaho 1	Compton I. White	Democratic	1932	Incumbent re-elected.	▌ ✓ Compton I. White (Democratic) 62.0%; ▌Edward Gaffney (Republican) 38.0%
Idaho 2	Henry Dworshak	Republican	1938	Incumbent re-elected.	▌ ✓ Henry Dworshak (Republican) 53.1%; ▌Ira H. Masters (Democratic) 46.9%

== Illinois ==
District	Incumbent			This race	
District	Member	Party	First elected	Results	Candidates
Illinois 1	Arthur Wergs Mitchell	Democratic	1934	Incumbent re-elected.	▌ ✓ Arthur Wergs Mitchell (Democratic) 52.7%; ▌William E. King (Republican) 46.7%
Illinois 2	Raymond S. McKeough	Democratic	1934	Incumbent re-elected.	▌ ✓ Raymond S. McKeough (Democratic) 51.4%; ▌P. H. Moynihan (Republican) 48.6%
Illinois 3	Edward A. Kelly	Democratic	1930	Incumbent re-elected.	▌ ✓ Edward A. Kelly (Democratic) 51.1%; ▌Waldemar J. Roehler (Republican) 48.9%
Illinois 4	Harry P. Beam	Democratic	1930	Incumbent re-elected.	▌ ✓ Harry P. Beam (Democratic) 77.4%; ▌Henry F. Schmudde (Republican) 22.6%
Illinois 5	Adolph J. Sabath	Democratic	1906	Incumbent re-elected.	▌ ✓ Adolph J. Sabath (Democratic) 71.0%; ▌Martin Dykema (Republican) 29.0%
Illinois 6	A. F. Maciejewski	Democratic	1938	Incumbent re-elected.	▌ ✓ A. F. Maciejewski (Democratic) 56.2%; ▌Joseph Wagner (Republican) 43.8%
Illinois 7	Leonard W. Schuetz	Democratic	1930	Incumbent re-elected.	▌ ✓ Leonard W. Schuetz (Democratic) 50.9%; ▌James G. Moreland (Republican) 49.1%
Illinois 8	Leo Kocialkowski	Democratic	1932	Incumbent re-elected.	▌ ✓ Leo Kocialkowski (Democratic) 78.1%; ▌Anthony V. Champagne (Republican) 21.9%
Illinois 9	James McAndrews	Democratic	1934	Incumbent lost re-election. Republican gain.	▌ ✓ Charles S. Dewey (Republican) 53.3%; ▌James McAndrews (Democratic) 46.7%
Illinois 10	Ralph E. Church	Republican	1934	Incumbent retired to run for U.S. senator. Republican hold.	▌ ✓ George A. Paddock (Republican) 61.3%; ▌John Haderlein (Democratic) 38.7%
Illinois 11	Chauncey W. Reed	Republican	1934	Incumbent re-elected.	▌ ✓ Chauncey W. Reed (Republican) 64.6%; ▌Edgar O. Eakin (Democratic) 35.4%
Illinois 12	Noah M. Mason	Republican	1936	Incumbent re-elected.	▌ ✓ Noah M. Mason (Republican) 60.6%; ▌August C. Engh (Democratic) 39.4%
Illinois 13	Leo E. Allen	Republican	1932	Incumbent re-elected.	▌ ✓ Leo E. Allen (Republican) 67.6%; ▌John B. Hayes (Democratic) 32.4%
Illinois 14	Anton J. Johnson	Republican	1938	Incumbent re-elected.	▌ ✓ Anton J. Johnson (Republican) 52.3%; ▌Forest Dizotell (Democratic) 47.7%
Illinois 15	Robert B. Chiperfield	Republican	1938	Incumbent re-elected.	▌ ✓ Robert B. Chiperfield (Republican) 56.4%; ▌Russell M. Gunn (Democratic) 43.6%
Illinois 16	Everett Dirksen	Republican	1932	Incumbent re-elected.	▌ ✓ Everett Dirksen (Republican) 58.1%; ▌M. R. Clark (Democratic) 41.9%
Illinois 17	Leslie C. Arends	Republican	1934	Incumbent re-elected.	▌ ✓ Leslie C. Arends (Republican) 61.1%; ▌J. Joseph Pitts (Democratic) 38.9%
Illinois 18	Jessie Sumner	Republican	1938	Incumbent re-elected.	▌ ✓ Jessie Sumner (Republican) 53.2%; ▌James A. Meeks (Democratic) 46.8%
Illinois 19	William H. Wheat	Republican	1938	Incumbent re-elected.	▌ ✓ William H. Wheat (Republican) 50.6%; ▌Alfred D. Huston (Democratic) 49.4%
Illinois 20	James M. Barnes	Democratic	1938	Incumbent re-elected.	▌ ✓ James M. Barnes (Democratic) 51.7%; ▌Hardin E. Hanks (Republican) 48.3%
Illinois 21	Frank W. Fries	Democratic	1936	Incumbent lost re-election. Republican gain.	▌ ✓ George Evan Howell (Republican) 51.6%; ▌Frank W. Fries (Democratic) 48.4%
Illinois 22	Edwin M. Schaefer	Democratic	1932	Incumbent re-elected.	▌ ✓ Edwin M. Schaefer (Democratic) 53.8%; ▌Calvin D. Johnson (Republican) 46.2%
Illinois 23	Laurence F. Arnold	Democratic	1936	Incumbent re-elected.	▌ ✓ Laurence F. Arnold (Democratic) 51.0%; ▌Ben O. Sumner (Republican) 49.0%
Illinois 24	Claude V. Parsons	Democratic	1930	Incumbent lost re-election. Republican gain.	▌ ✓ James V. Heidinger (Republican) 53.6%; ▌Claude V. Parsons (Democratic) 46.4%
Illinois 25	Kent E. Keller	Democratic	1930	Incumbent lost re-election. Republican gain.	▌ ✓ C. W. Bishop (Republican) 50.5%; ▌Kent E. Keller (Democratic) 49.5%
Illinois at-large	John C. Martin	Democratic	1938	Incumbent retired. Republican gain.	▌ ✓ William Stratton (Republican) 25.7%; ▌ ✓ Stephen A. Day (Republican) 25.3%; ▌Thomas Vernor Smith (Democratic) 24.7%; ▌Walter J. Orlikoski (Democratic) 24.0%; ▌Harry Fleischman (Independent) 0.09%; ▌Lee S. Gregory (Independent) 0.09%; ▌Willis Ray Wilson (Independent) 0.09%; ▌Lena Duell Vincent (Independent) 0.08%
Illinois at-large	Thomas Vernor Smith	Democratic	1938	Incumbent lost re-election. Republican gain.	▌ ✓ William Stratton (Republican) 25.7%; ▌ ✓ Stephen A. Day (Republican) 25.3%; ▌Thomas Vernor Smith (Democratic) 24.7%; ▌Walter J. Orlikoski (Democratic) 24.0%; ▌Harry Fleischman (Independent) 0.09%; ▌Lee S. Gregory (Independent) 0.09%; ▌Willis Ray Wilson (Independent) 0.09%; ▌Lena Duell Vincent (Independent) 0.08%

== Indiana ==
District	Incumbent			This race	
District	Member	Party	First elected	Results	Candidates
Indiana 1	William T. Schulte	Democratic	1932	Incumbent re-elected.	▌ ✓ William T. Schulte (Democratic) 60.9%; ▌M. Elliott Belshaw (Republican) 39.1%
Indiana 2	Charles A. Halleck	Republican	1935 (special)	Incumbent re-elected.	▌ ✓ Charles A. Halleck (Republican) 58.1%; ▌James O. Cox (Democratic) 41.9%
Indiana 3	Robert A. Grant	Republican	1938	Incumbent re-elected.	▌ ✓ Robert A. Grant (Republican) 51.3%; ▌George Sands (Democratic) 48.7%
Indiana 4	George W. Gillie	Republican	1938	Incumbent re-elected.	▌ ✓ George W. Gillie (Republican) 58.0%; ▌Frank E. Corbett (Democratic) 42.0%
Indiana 5	Forest Harness	Republican	1938	Incumbent re-elected.	▌ ✓ Forest Harness (Republican) 54.7%; ▌George W. Wolf (Democratic) 45.3%
Indiana 6	Noble J. Johnson	Republican	1938	Incumbent re-elected.	▌ ✓ Noble J. Johnson (Republican) 52.3%; ▌Lenhardt E. Bauer (Democratic) 47.7%
Indiana 7	Gerald W. Landis	Republican	1938	Incumbent re-elected.	▌ ✓ Gerald W. Landis (Republican) 52.2%; ▌Charles H. Bedwell (Democratic) 47.8%
Indiana 8	John W. Boehne Jr.	Democratic	1930	Incumbent re-elected.	▌ ✓ John W. Boehne Jr. (Democratic) 55.5%; ▌Charles F. Werner (Republican) 44.5%
Indiana 9	Eugene B. Crowe	Democratic	1930	Incumbent lost re-election. Republican gain.	▌ ✓ Earl Wilson (Republican) 50.9%; ▌Eugene B. Crowe (Democratic) 49.1%
Indiana 10	Raymond S. Springer	Republican	1938	Incumbent re-elected.	▌ ✓ Raymond S. Springer (Republican) 53.0%; ▌Don C. Ward (Democratic) 47.0%
Indiana 11	William Larrabee	Democratic	1930	Incumbent re-elected.	▌ ✓ William Larrabee (Democratic) 51.7%; ▌Maurice G. Robinson (Republican) 48.3%
Indiana 12	Louis Ludlow	Democratic	1928	Incumbent re-elected.	▌ ✓ Louis Ludlow (Democratic) 52.9%; ▌James A. Collins (Republican) 47.1%

== Iowa ==
District	Incumbent			This race	
District	Member	Party	First elected	Results	Candidates
Iowa 1	Thomas E. Martin	Republican	1938	Incumbent re-elected.	▌ ✓ Thomas E. Martin (Republican) 60.4%; ▌Zoe S. Nabers (Democratic) 39.6%
Iowa 2	William S. Jacobsen	Democratic	1936	Incumbent re-elected.	▌ ✓ William S. Jacobsen (Democratic) 52.2%; ▌W. A. McCullough (Republican) 47.8%
Iowa 3	John W. Gwynne	Republican	1934	Incumbent re-elected.	▌ ✓ John W. Gwynne (Republican) 59.9%; ▌Ernest J. Seeman (Democratic) 40.1%
Iowa 4	Henry O. Talle	Republican	1938	Incumbent re-elected.	▌ ✓ Henry O. Talle (Republican) 56.4%; ▌Morgan J. McEnaney (Democratic) 43.6%
Iowa 5	Karl M. LeCompte	Republican	1938	Incumbent re-elected.	▌ ✓ Karl M. LeCompte (Republican) 53.3%; ▌Roy E. Stevens (Democratic) 46.7%
Iowa 6	Robert K. Goodwin	Republican	1940 (special)	Incumbent retired. Republican hold.	▌ ✓ Paul Cunningham (Republican) 52.3%; ▌E. Frank Fox (Democratic) 47.6%; ▌D. Robinson (Prohibition) 0.2%
Iowa 7	Ben F. Jensen	Republican	1938	Incumbent re-elected.	▌ ✓ Ben F. Jensen (Republican) 58.6%; ▌Ernest M. Miller (Democratic) 41.4%
Iowa 8	Fred C. Gilchrist	Republican	1930	Incumbent re-elected.	▌ ✓ Fred C. Gilchrist (Republican) 58.1%; ▌Frank J. Lund (Democratic) 41.9%
Iowa 9	Vincent F. Harrington	Democratic	1936	Incumbent re-elected.	▌ ✓ Vincent F. Harrington (Democratic) 50.8%; ▌Albert F. Swanson (Republican) 49.2%

== Kansas ==
District	Incumbent			This race	
District	Member	Party	First elected	Results	Candidates
Kansas 1	William P. Lambertson	Republican	1928	Incumbent re-elected.	▌ ✓ William P. Lambertson (Republican) 61.0%; ▌Clive R. Lane (Democratic) 39.0%
Kansas 2	Ulysses Samuel Guyer	Republican	1926	Incumbent re-elected.	▌ ✓ Ulysses Samuel Guyer (Republican) 54.0%; ▌Harold H. Harding (Democratic) 46.0%
Kansas 3	Thomas Daniel Winter	Republican	1938	Incumbent re-elected.	▌ ✓ Thomas Daniel Winter (Republican) 55.2%; ▌W. E. Ledbetter (Democratic) 44.8%
Kansas 4	Edward Herbert Rees	Republican	1936	Incumbent re-elected.	▌ ✓ Edward Herbert Rees (Republican) 62.5%; ▌Dudley Doolittle (Democratic) 37.5%
Kansas 5	John Mills Houston	Democratic	1934	Incumbent re-elected.	▌ ✓ John Mills Houston (Democratic) 52.5%; ▌Stanley Taylor (Republican) 47.5%
Kansas 6	Frank Carlson	Republican	1934	Incumbent re-elected.	▌ ✓ Frank Carlson (Republican) 60.9%; ▌Max Jones (Democratic) 39.1%
Kansas 7	Clifford R. Hope	Republican	1926	Incumbent re-elected.	▌ ✓ Clifford R. Hope (Republican) 63.9%; ▌Claude E. Main (Democratic) 36.1%

== Kentucky ==
District	Incumbent			This race	
District	Member	Party	First elected	Results	Candidates
Kentucky 1	Noble Jones Gregory	Democratic	1936	Incumbent re-elected.	▌ ✓ Noble Jones Gregory (Democratic); Uncontested
Kentucky 2	Beverly M. Vincent	Democratic	1937 (special)	Incumbent re-elected.	▌ ✓ Beverly M. Vincent (Democratic); Uncontested
Kentucky 3	Emmet O'Neal	Democratic	1934	Incumbent re-elected.	▌ ✓ Emmet O'Neal (Democratic) 60.0%; ▌Ben J. Brumleve (Republican) 40.0%
Kentucky 4	Edward W. Creal	Democratic	1935 (special)	Incumbent re-elected.	▌ ✓ Edward W. Creal (Democratic) 58.5%; ▌Lewis H. Mather (Republican) 41.5%
Kentucky 5	Brent Spence	Democratic	1930	Incumbent re-elected.	▌ ✓ Brent Spence (Democratic) 61.2%; ▌Henry J. Cook (Republican) 38.8%
Kentucky 6	Virgil Chapman	Democratic	1930	Incumbent re-elected.	▌ ✓ Virgil Chapman (Democratic) 60.5%; ▌William D. Rogers (Republican) 39.5%
Kentucky 7	Andrew J. May	Democratic	1930	Incumbent re-elected.	▌ ✓ Andrew J. May (Democratic) 56.8%; ▌James W. Turner (Republican) 43.2%
Kentucky 8	Joe B. Bates	Democratic	1930	Incumbent re-elected.	▌ ✓ Joe B. Bates (Democratic) 58.0%; ▌H. Clell Hayes (Republican) 42.0%
Kentucky 9	John M. Robsion	Republican	1934	Incumbent re-elected.	▌ ✓ John M. Robsion (Republican) 61.7%; ▌Bert Rowland (Democratic) 38.3%

== Louisiana ==
Several close allies of former governor Huey Long were defeated in primaries by reform candidates.

District	Incumbent			This race	
District	Member	Party	First elected	Results	Candidates
Louisiana 1	Joachim O. Fernández	Democratic	1930	Incumbent lost renomination. Democratic hold.	▌ ✓ F. Edward Hébert (Democratic); Uncontested
Louisiana 2	Paul H. Maloney	Democratic	1930	Incumbent lost renomination. Democratic hold.	▌ ✓ Hale Boggs (Democratic); Uncontested
Louisiana 3	Robert L. Mouton	Democratic	1936	Incumbent lost renomination. Democratic hold.	▌ ✓ James R. Domengeaux (Democratic) 66.0%; ▌David W. Pipes Jr. (Republican) 34.0%
Louisiana 4	Overton Brooks	Democratic	1936	Incumbent re-elected.	▌ ✓ Overton Brooks (Democratic) 99.97%; ▌Benjamin E. Neal (Independent) 0.03%
Louisiana 5	Newt V. Mills	Democratic	1936	Incumbent re-elected.	▌ ✓ Newt V. Mills (Democratic); Uncontested
Louisiana 6	John K. Griffith	Democratic	1936	Incumbent lost renomination. Democratic hold.	▌ ✓ Jared Y. Sanders Jr. (Democratic); Uncontested
Louisiana 7	René L. De Rouen	Democratic	1927	Incumbent retired. Democratic hold.	▌ ✓ Vance Plauché (Democratic); Uncontested
Louisiana 8	A. Leonard Allen	Democratic	1936	Incumbent re-elected.	▌ ✓ A. Leonard Allen (Democratic); Uncontested

== Maine ==
District	Incumbent			This race	
District	Member	Party	First elected	Results	Candidates
Maine 1	James C. Oliver	Republican	1936	Incumbent re-elected.	▌ ✓ James C. Oliver (Republican) 63.4%; ▌Peter M. MacDonald (Democratic) 36.6%
Maine 2	Margaret Chase Smith	Republican	1940	Incumbent re-elected.	▌ ✓ Margaret Chase Smith (Republican) 64.6%; ▌Edward J. Beauchamp (Democratic) 35.4%
Maine 3	Owen Brewster	Republican	1934	Incumbent retired to run for U.S. senator. Republican hold.	▌ ✓ Frank Fellows (Republican) 66.1%; ▌Thomas N. Curran (Democratic) 33.9%

== Maryland ==
District	Incumbent			This race	
District	Member	Party	First elected	Results	Candidates
Maryland 1	David Jenkins Ward	Democratic	1939 (special)	Incumbent re-elected.	▌ ✓ David Jenkins Ward (Democratic) 53.9%; ▌Robert F. Duer (Republican) 46.1%; ▌Thomas F. Johnson (Independent) 0.006%
Maryland 2	William P. Cole Jr.	Democratic	1930	Incumbent re-elected.	▌ ✓ William P. Cole Jr. (Democratic) 65.7%; ▌Theodore F. Brown (Republican) 34.3%
Maryland 3	Thomas D'Alesandro Jr.	Democratic	1938	Incumbent re-elected.	▌ ✓ Thomas D'Alesandro Jr. (Democratic) 61.5%; ▌John A. Janetzke Jr. (Republican) 38.5%
Maryland 4	Ambrose Jerome Kennedy	Democratic	1932	Incumbent lost renomination. Democratic hold.	▌ ✓ John Ambrose Meyer (Democratic) 56.6%; ▌Daniel Ellison (Republican) 43.4%
Maryland 5	Lansdale Sasscer	Democratic	1939 (special)	Incumbent re-elected.	▌ ✓ Lansdale Sasscer (Democratic) 71.0%; ▌John N. Torvestad (Republican) 29.0%; ▌George Brown (Independent) 0.001%
Maryland 6	William D. Byron	Democratic	1938	Incumbent re-elected.	▌ ✓ William D. Byron (Democratic) 53.5%; ▌Walter Johnson (Republican) 46.5%; ▌Charles P. Stewart (Independent) 0.001%

== Massachusetts ==
District	Incumbent			This race	
District	Member	Party	First elected	Results	Candidates
Massachusetts 1	Allen T. Treadway	Republican	1912	Incumbent re-elected.	▌ ✓ Allen T. Treadway (Republican) 57.1%; ▌Clifford J. Akey (Democratic) 42.9%
Massachusetts 2	Charles R. Clason	Republican	1936	Incumbent re-elected.	▌ ✓ Charles R. Clason (Republican) 58.4%; ▌Patrick A. Doyle (Democratic) 41.6%
Massachusetts 3	Joseph E. Casey	Democratic	1934	Incumbent re-elected.	▌ ✓ Joseph E. Casey (Democratic) 54.6%; ▌Edward T. Simoneau (Republican) 45.4%
Massachusetts 4	Pehr G. Holmes	Republican	1930	Incumbent re-elected.	▌ ✓ Pehr G. Holmes (Republican) 53.2%; ▌Frank J. McGrail (Democratic) 46.0%; ▌Helen P. Nylen (Prohibition) 0.9%
Massachusetts 5	Edith Nourse Rogers	Republican	1925	Incumbent re-elected.	▌ ✓ Edith Nourse Rogers (Republican) 76.2%; ▌Francis J. Roane (Democratic) 23.8%
Massachusetts 6	George J. Bates	Republican	1936	Incumbent re-elected.	▌ ✓ George J. Bates (Republican) 71.6%; ▌James D. Burns (Democratic) 28.4%
Massachusetts 7	Lawrence J. Connery	Democratic	1937 (special)	Incumbent re-elected.	▌ ✓ Lawrence J. Connery (Democratic) 62.1%; ▌William Henry Haskell (Republican) 36.4%; ▌Thaxter Eaton (Prohibition) 1.5%
Massachusetts 8	Arthur D. Healey	Democratic	1932	Incumbent re-elected.	▌ ✓ Arthur D. Healey (Democratic) 55.4%; ▌John J. Irwin (Republican) 44.6%
Massachusetts 9	Robert Luce	Republican	1936	Incumbent lost re-election. Democratic gain.	▌ ✓ Thomas H. Eliot (Democratic) 52.1%; ▌Robert Luce (Republican) 47.9%
Massachusetts 10	George H. Tinkham	Republican	1914	Incumbent re-elected.	▌ ✓ George H. Tinkham (Republican) 59.1%; ▌David M. Owens (Democratic) 40.9%
Massachusetts 11	Thomas A. Flaherty	Democratic	1937 (special)	Incumbent re-elected.	▌ ✓ Thomas A. Flaherty (Democratic) 83.8%; ▌Benjamin J. Green (Republican) 16.2%
Massachusetts 12	John W. McCormack	Democratic	1928	Incumbent re-elected.	▌ ✓ John W. McCormack (Democratic) 78.1%; ▌Henry J. Allen (Republican) 21.9%
Massachusetts 13	Richard B. Wigglesworth	Republican	1928	Incumbent re-elected.	▌ ✓ Richard B. Wigglesworth (Republican) 65.0%; ▌Francis G. O'Neill (Democratic) 34.1%; ▌Freeman Putney Jr. (Prohibition) 0.8%
Massachusetts 14	Joseph W. Martin Jr.	Republican	1924	Incumbent re-elected.	▌ ✓ Joseph W. Martin Jr. (Republican) 54.4%; ▌Harold E. Cole (Democratic) 45.6%
Massachusetts 15	Charles L. Gifford	Republican	1922	Incumbent re-elected.	▌ ✓ Charles L. Gifford (Republican) 57.8%; ▌George F. Backus (Democratic) 42.2%

== Michigan ==
District	Incumbent			This race	
District	Member	Party	First elected	Results	Candidates
Michigan 1	Rudolph G. Tenerowicz	Democratic	1938	Incumbent re-elected.	▌ ✓ Rudolph G. Tenerowicz (Democratic) 79.9%; ▌Donald J. Marshall (Republican) 19.5%; ▌Thomas X. Dombrowski (Communist) 0.4%; ▌Stanley Wincek (Socialist) 0.3%
Michigan 2	Earl C. Michener	Republican	1934	Incumbent re-elected.	▌ ✓ Earl C. Michener (Republican) 62.3%; ▌Redmond M. Burr (Democratic) 37.7%; ▌Walter S. Haynes (Prohibition) 0.05%
Michigan 3	Paul W. Shafer	Republican	1936	Incumbent re-elected.	▌ ✓ Paul W. Shafer (Republican) 62.1%; ▌Charles T. McSherry (Democratic) 37.6%; ▌Carson McDaniels (Socialist) 0.2%; ▌Oliver O. Pickard (Prohibition) 0.1%
Michigan 4	Clare Hoffman	Republican	1934	Incumbent re-elected.	▌ ✓ Clare Hoffman (Republican) 61.8%; ▌Harvey Hope Jarvis (Democratic) 38.1%; ▌Sarah Bishop (Prohibition) 0.08%
Michigan 5	Bartel J. Jonkman	Republican	1940 (special)	Incumbent re-elected.	▌ ✓ Bartel J. Jonkman (Republican) 53.7%; ▌Garrett Heyns (Democratic) 46.3%
Michigan 6	William W. Blackney	Republican	1938	Incumbent re-elected.	▌ ✓ William W. Blackney (Republican) 51.1%; ▌Charles R. Adair (Democratic) 48.6%; ▌Harry F. Griffin (Socialist) 0.2%; ▌Royal S. Woodhead (Prohibition) 0.07%
Michigan 7	Jesse P. Wolcott	Republican	1930	Incumbent re-elected.	▌ ✓ Jesse P. Wolcott (Republican) 65.2%; ▌Albert A. Wagner (Democratic) 34.8%; ▌Edward Voller (Prohibition) 0.06%
Michigan 8	Fred L. Crawford	Republican	1934	Incumbent re-elected.	▌ ✓ Fred L. Crawford (Republican) 61.2%; ▌Louis C. Schwinger (Democratic) 38.8%; ▌Holgar Larson (Prohibition) 0.06%
Michigan 9	Albert J. Engel	Republican	1934	Incumbent re-elected.	▌ ✓ Albert J. Engel (Republican) 56.8%; ▌Noel P. Fox (Democratic) 43.1%; ▌William H. Boileau (Prohibition) 0.07%
Michigan 10	Roy O. Woodruff	Republican	1920	Incumbent re-elected.	▌ ✓ Roy O. Woodruff (Republican) 61.9%; ▌William J. Kelly (Democratic) 37.9%; ▌F. A. Halsted (Socialist) 0.10%; ▌Gustav W. Malm (Prohibition) 0.06%
Michigan 11	Frederick Van Ness Bradley	Republican	1938	Incumbent re-elected.	▌ ✓ Frederick Van Ness Bradley (Republican) 51.1%; ▌Wendell L. Lund (Democratic) 48.7%; ▌Raymond Anderson (Communist) 0.09%; ▌S. Basil Dickinson (Prohibition) 0.05%
Michigan 12	Frank Eugene Hook	Democratic	1934	Incumbent re-elected.	▌ ✓ Frank Eugene Hook (Democratic) 51.3%; ▌John B. Bennett (Republican) 48.4%; ▌Arvid N. Phillips (Communist) 0.4%
Michigan 13	Clarence J. McLeod	Republican	1938	Incumbent lost re-election. Democratic gain.	▌ ✓ George D. O'Brien (Democratic) 54.6%; ▌Clarence J. McLeod (Republican) 44.9%; ▌William Jenkins (Socialist) 0.3%; ▌Huge Beiswenger (Communist) 0.2%
Michigan 14	Louis C. Rabaut	Democratic	1934	Incumbent re-elected.	▌ ✓ Louis C. Rabaut (Democratic) 59.0%; ▌George B. Schaeffer (Republican) 41.0%
Michigan 15	John Dingell Sr.	Democratic	1932	Incumbent re-elected.	▌ ✓ John Dingell Sr. (Democratic) 61.9%; ▌Archie C. Fraser (Republican) 37.9%; ▌Woodrow Ingram (Socialist) 0.3%
Michigan 16	John Lesinski Sr.	Democratic	1932	Incumbent re-elected.	▌ ✓ John Lesinski Sr. (Democratic) 58.8%; ▌Robert Ford (Republican) 40.8%; ▌Mint Nauta (Socialist) 0.3%; ▌Nat Wald (Communist) 0.2%
Michigan 17	George Anthony Dondero	Republican	1932	Incumbent re-elected.	▌ ✓ George Anthony Dondero (Republican) 54.7%; ▌Draper Allen (Democratic) 45.1%; ▌Walter Allmendiger (Socialist) 0.2%

== Minnesota ==
District	Incumbent			This race	
District	Member	Party	First elected	Results	Candidates
Minnesota 1	August H. Andresen	Republican	1934	Incumbent re-elected.	▌ ✓ August H. Andresen (Republican) 64.8%; ▌Francis L. Murphy (Democratic) 20.1%; ▌Endre B. Anderson (Farmer–Labor) 15.1%
Minnesota 2	Elmer Ryan	Democratic	1934	Incumbent lost re-election. Republican gain.	▌ ✓ Joseph P. O'Hara (Republican) 49.0%; ▌Elmer Ryan (Democratic) 42.5%; ▌C. E. McNaught (Farmer–Labor) 8.5%
Minnesota 3	John G. Alexander	Republican	1938	Incumbent lost renomination. Republican hold.	▌ ✓ Richard P. Gale (Republican) 43.5%; ▌Henry Teigan (Farmer–Labor) 34.2%; ▌Martin A. Hogan (Democratic) 19.3%; ▌John G. Alexander (Independent) 3.1%
Minnesota 4	Melvin Maas	Republican	1934	Incumbent re-elected.	▌ ✓ Melvin Maas (Republican) 58.8%; ▌George L. Siegel (Farmer–Labor) 28.2%; ▌Willard J. Moran (Democratic) 12.9%
Minnesota 5	Oscar Youngdahl	Republican	1938	Incumbent re-elected.	▌ ✓ Oscar Youngdahl (Republican) 52.1%; ▌Dewey Johnson (Farmer–Labor) 34.3%; ▌LaMoine Montgomery Dowling (Democratic) 13.6%
Minnesota 6	Harold Knutson	Republican	1934	Incumbent re-elected.	▌ ✓ Harold Knutson (Republican) 61.5%; ▌E. Thomas O'Briesn (Democratic) 38.5%
Minnesota 7	Herman Carl Andersen	Republican	1938	Incumbent re-elected.	▌ ✓ Herman Carl Andersen (Republican) 50.7%; ▌Harold L. Peterson (Farmer–Labor) 32.6%; ▌J. L. O'Connor (Democratic) 16.8%
Minnesota 8	William Alvin Pittenger	Republican	1938	Incumbent re-elected.	▌ ✓ William Alvin Pittenger (Republican) 54.2%; ▌John Bernard (Farmer–Labor) 28.5%; ▌M. W. Raihala (Democratic) 17.3%
Minnesota 9	Rich T. Buckler	Farmer–Labor	1934	Incumbent re-elected.	▌ ✓ Rich T. Buckler (Farmer–Labor) 43.4%; ▌Colvin G. Butler (Republican) 42.8%; ▌Frank H. Timm (Democratic) 13.7%

== Mississippi ==
District	Incumbent			This race	
District	Member	Party	First elected	Results	Candidates
Mississippi 1	John E. Rankin	Democratic	1920	Incumbent re-elected.	▌ ✓ John E. Rankin (Democratic); Uncontested
Mississippi 2	Wall Doxey	Democratic	1928	Incumbent re-elected.	▌ ✓ Wall Doxey (Democratic); Uncontested
Mississippi 3	William Madison Whittington	Democratic	1924	Incumbent re-elected.	▌ ✓ William Madison Whittington (Democratic); Uncontested
Mississippi 4	Aaron L. Ford	Democratic	1934	Incumbent re-elected.	▌ ✓ Aaron L. Ford (Democratic); Uncontested
Mississippi 5	Ross A. Collins	Democratic	1936	Incumbent re-elected.	▌ ✓ Ross A. Collins (Democratic); Uncontested
Mississippi 6	William M. Colmer	Democratic	1932	Incumbent re-elected.	▌ ✓ William M. Colmer (Democratic); Uncontested
Mississippi 7	Dan R. McGehee	Democratic	1934	Incumbent re-elected.	▌ ✓ Dan R. McGehee (Democratic); Uncontested

== Missouri ==
District	Incumbent			This race	
District	Member	Party	First elected	Results	Candidates
Missouri 1	Milton A. Romjue	Democratic	1922	Incumbent re-elected.	▌ ✓ Milton A. Romjue (Democratic) 50.5%; ▌Henry S. Beardsley (Republican) 49.5%
Missouri 2	William L. Nelson	Democratic	1934	Incumbent re-elected.	▌ ✓ William L. Nelson (Democratic) 53.8%; ▌Roy O. Miller (Republican) 46.2%; ▌Fred Umstead (Socialist Labor) 0.003%
Missouri 3	Richard M. Duncan	Democratic	1932	Incumbent re-elected.	▌ ✓ Richard M. Duncan (Democratic) 53.3%; ▌Fred Maughmer (Republican) 46.7%
Missouri 4	C. Jasper Bell	Democratic	1934	Incumbent re-elected.	▌ ✓ C. Jasper Bell (Democratic) 60.0%; ▌John W. Mitchell (Republican) 40.0%; ▌William Henke (Socialist Labor) 0.01%
Missouri 5	Joe Shannon	Democratic	1930	Incumbent re-elected.	▌ ✓ Joe Shannon (Democratic) 54.2%; ▌Forest W. Hanna (Republican) 45.8%; ▌Karl Oberheu (Socialist Labor) 0.02%
Missouri 6	Reuben T. Wood	Democratic	1932	Incumbent lost re-election. Republican gain.	▌ ✓ Philip A. Bennett (Republican) 53.7%; ▌Reuben T. Wood (Democratic) 46.3%
Missouri 7	Dewey Jackson Short	Republican	1934	Incumbent re-elected.	▌ ✓ Dewey Jackson Short (Republican) 59.3%; ▌Vernon Sigars (Democratic) 40.7%
Missouri 8	Clyde Williams	Democratic	1930	Incumbent re-elected.	▌ ✓ Clyde Williams (Democratic) 51.1%; ▌Parke M. Banta (Republican) 48.9%; ▌William Doyen (Socialist Labor) 0.002%
Missouri 9	Clarence Cannon	Democratic	1922	Incumbent re-elected.	▌ ✓ Clarence Cannon (Democratic) 55.3%; ▌F. B. Meyer (Republican) 44.7%
Missouri 10	Orville Zimmerman	Democratic	1934	Incumbent re-elected.	▌ ✓ Orville Zimmerman (Democratic) 57.4%; ▌C. E. Davenport (Republican) 42.6%
Missouri 11	Thomas C. Hennings Jr.	Democratic	1934	Incumbent resigned. Democratic hold.	▌ ✓ John B. Sullivan (Democratic) 55.7%; ▌Charles J. Riley (Republican) 44.3%; ▌James Wagoner (Socialist Labor) 0.01%
Missouri 12	Charles Arthur Anderson	Democratic	1936	Incumbent lost re-election. Republican gain.	▌ ✓ Walter C. Ploeser (Republican) 53.9%; ▌Charles Arthur Anderson (Democratic) 46.1%; ▌Peter Tendler (Socialist Labor) 0.03%
Missouri 13	John J. Cochran	Democratic	1926	Incumbent re-elected.	▌ ✓ John J. Cochran (Democratic) 64.5%; ▌W. S. Sanford (Republican) 35.4%; ▌Norman Kochendorfer (Socialist Labor) 0.01%

== Montana ==
District	Incumbent			This race	
District	Member	Party	First elected	Results	Candidates
Montana 1	Jacob Thorkelson	Republican	1938	Incumbent lost renomination. Republican hold.	▌ ✓ Jeannette Rankin (Republican) 54.5%; ▌Jerry J. O'Connell (Democratic) 45.5%
Montana 2	James F. O'Connor	Democratic	1936	Incumbent re-elected.	▌ ✓ James F. O'Connor (Democratic) 62.0%; ▌Melvin N. Hoiness (Republican) 37.1%; ▌Leverne Hamilton (Socialist) 0.9%

== Nebraska ==
District	Incumbent			This race	
District	Member	Party	First elected	Results	Candidates
Nebraska 1	John Hyde Sweet	Republican	1940	Incumbent retired. Republican hold.	▌ ✓ Oren S. Copeland (Republican) 55.6%; ▌Henry Carl Luckey (Democratic) 44.4%
Nebraska 2	Charles F. McLaughlin	Democratic	1934	Incumbent re-elected.	▌ ✓ Charles F. McLaughlin (Democratic) 56.6%; ▌Theodore W. Metcalf (Republican) 43.4%
Nebraska 3	Karl Stefan	Republican	1934	Incumbent re-elected.	▌ ✓ Karl Stefan (Republican) 79.9%; ▌Victor J. McGonigle (Democratic) 17.0%; ▌Paul Burke (Independent) 3.1%
Nebraska 4	Carl Curtis	Republican	1938	Incumbent re-elected.	▌ ✓ Carl Curtis (Republican) 57.7%; ▌R. O. Canaday (Democratic) 25.2%; ▌Charles Gustav Binderup (Independent) 17.1%
Nebraska 5	Harry B. Coffee	Democratic	1934	Incumbent re-elected.	▌ ✓ Harry B. Coffee (Democratic) 58.0%; ▌Bert Howard (Republican) 42.0%

== Nevada ==
District	Incumbent			This race	
District	Member	Party	First elected	Results	Candidates
Nevada at-large	James G. Scrugham	Democratic	1932	Incumbent re-elected.	▌ ✓ James G. Scrugham (Democratic) 64.5%; ▌Ralph W. Lattin (Republican) 35.5%

== New Hampshire ==
District	Incumbent			This race	
District	Member	Party	First elected	Results	Candidates
New Hampshire 1	Arthur B. Jenks	Republican	1938	Incumbent re-elected.	▌ ✓ Arthur B. Jenks (Republican) 51.1%; ▌Alphonse Roy (Democratic) 48.9%
New Hampshire 2	Foster Waterman Stearns	Republican	1938	Incumbent re-elected.	▌ ✓ Foster Waterman Stearns (Republican) 53.0%; ▌Daniel J. Moriarty (Democratic) 47.0%

== New Jersey ==
District	Incumbent			This race	
District	Member	Party	First elected	Results	Candidates
New Jersey 1	Charles A. Wolverton	Republican	1926	Incumbent re-elected.	▌ ✓ Charles A. Wolverton (Republican) 55.5%; ▌Harry Roye (Democratic) 44.3%; ▌Andrew S. Hall (Socialist) 0.1%; ▌Esther H. Elfreth (Prohibition) 0.06%; ▌John F. Norman (Communist) 0.04%
New Jersey 2	Walter S. Jeffries	Republican	1938	Incumbent lost re-election. Democratic gain.	▌ ✓ Elmer H. Wene (Democratic) 52.1%; ▌Walter S. Jeffries (Republican) 47.8%; ▌Joseph B. Sharp (Prohibition) 0.03%
New Jersey 3	William H. Sutphin	Democratic	1930	Incumbent re-elected.	▌ ✓ William H. Sutphin (Democratic) 51.7%; ▌Joseph C. Irwin (Republican) 48.2%; ▌Horace T. Brown (Prohibition) 0.02%
New Jersey 4	D. Lane Powers	Republican	1932	Incumbent re-elected.	▌ ✓ D. Lane Powers (Republican) 55.9%; ▌Thomas S. Dignan (Democratic) 44.0%; ▌William C. Kauffman (Socialist) 0.05%; ▌Gus Napoleon (Ind. Progressive) 0.03%; ▌Wilbur Jones (Prohibition) 0.02%
New Jersey 5	Charles A. Eaton	Republican	1924	Incumbent re-elected.	▌ ✓ Charles A. Eaton (Republican) 55.9%; ▌Charles R. M. Tuttle (Democratic) 44.0%; ▌Emily R. G. Klein (Prohibition) 0.03%
New Jersey 6	Donald H. McLean	Republican	1932	Incumbent re-elected.	▌ ✓ Donald H. McLean (Republican) 54.9%; ▌James E. Downes (Democratic) 44.1%; ▌Margaret Cameron Lowe (Prohibition) 0.6%; ▌Henry Allen (Communist) 0.2%; ▌Samuel Geneslaw (Socialist) 0.1%
New Jersey 7	J. Parnell Thomas	Republican	1936	Incumbent re-elected.	▌ ✓ J. Parnell Thomas (Republican) 64.6%; ▌Mort L. O'Connell (Democratic) 35.0%; ▌Frank A. Buono (Independent) 0.3%; ▌Robert M. Nitsche (Liberal Ind.) 0.05%; ▌H. E. Garrison (Prohibition) 0.03%
New Jersey 8	George N. Seger	Republican	1922	Incumbent died August 26, 1940. Republican hold.	▌ ✓ Gordon Canfield (Republican) 58.6%; ▌Addison P. Rosenkrans (Democratic) 41.1%; ▌William Sommers (Independent) 0.1%; ▌Henry Lun (Socialist Labor) 0.1%; ▌Donald Feenstra (Prohibition) 0.04%; ▌Stephen J. Knechtle (Independent) 0.02%
New Jersey 9	Frank C. Osmers Jr.	Republican	1938	Incumbent re-elected.	▌ ✓ Frank C. Osmers Jr. (Republican) 62.7%; ▌Abram A. Lebson (Democratic) 37.2%; ▌Stella Richardson (Prohibition) 0.04%
New Jersey 10	Fred A. Hartley Jr.	Republican	1928	Incumbent re-elected.	▌ ✓ Fred A. Hartley Jr. (Republican) 56.8%; ▌William E. Holmwood (Democratic) 41.2%; ▌Alonzo Odam (Socialist) 1.3%; ▌Joseph L. W. Boucher (Independent) 0.2%; ▌Frank Alfone (Independent) 0.2%; ▌Lawrence Mahan (Communist) 0.1%; ▌Mildred Clark Bopp (Socialist Labor) 0.04%; ▌Orrie De Bake (Prohibition) 0.02%
New Jersey 11	Albert L. Vreeland	Republican	1938	Incumbent re-elected.	▌ ✓ Albert L. Vreeland (Republican) 55.8%; ▌Mary C. Duffy (Democratic) 41.8%; ▌Wesley U. Morris (Prohibition) 1.8%; ▌Alfio Caudullo (Independent) 0.3%; ▌Nannie Penn (Communist) 0.2%; ▌John C. Privitera (Independent) 0.1%
New Jersey 12	Robert Kean	Republican	1938	Incumbent re-elected.	▌ ✓ Robert Kean (Republican) 53.7%; ▌Thomas J. Holleran (Democratic) 42.4%; ▌Stephan J. Stein (Pension) 1.8%; ▌Harry Samuel Neiwirth (Fusion) 1.6%; ▌Rose Risk (Communist) 0.3%; ▌John P. Wagner (Prohibition) 0.1%; ▌Rubye Smith (Socialist) 0.10%; ▌Ike Diamond (Roos. New Deal) 0.08%
New Jersey 13	Mary Teresa Norton	Democratic	1924	Incumbent re-elected.	▌ ✓ Mary Teresa Norton (Democratic) 70.2%; ▌Raymond J. Cuddy (Republican) 29.8%; ▌Oscar W. Nevins (Prohibition) 0.02%
New Jersey 14	Edward J. Hart	Democratic	1934	Incumbent re-elected.	▌ ✓ Edward J. Hart (Democratic) 65.3%; ▌Otto Trankler (Republican) 34.6%; ▌John Palangio (Socialist) 0.05%; ▌Jay Anyon (Communist) 0.03%; ▌S. P. Barackman (Prohibition) 0.008%

== New Mexico ==
District	Incumbent			This race	
District	Member	Party	First elected	Results	Candidates
New Mexico at-large	John J. Dempsey	Democratic	1934	Incumbent retired to run for U.S. senator. Democratic hold.	▌ ✓ Clinton Anderson (Democratic) 58.8%; ▌Herman R. Crile (Republican) 41.2%

== New York ==
District	Incumbent			This race	
District	Member	Party	First elected	Results	Candidates
New York 1	Leonard W. Hall	Republican	1938	Incumbent re-elected.	▌ ✓ Leonard W. Hall (Republican) 64.5%; ▌Frederick S. Farah (Democratic) 33.0%; ▌Sidney Edelberg (American Labor) 2.5%
New York 2	William Bernard Barry	Democratic	1935 (special)	Incumbent re-elected.	▌ ✓ William Bernard Barry (Democratic) 52.8%; ▌Thomas J. Styles (Republican) 41.5%; ▌Matthew Napear (American Labor) 5.1%; ▌Paul Crosbie (Communist) 0.6%
New York 3	Joseph L. Pfeifer	Democratic	1934	Incumbent re-elected.	▌ ✓ Joseph L. Pfeifer (Democratic) 70.6%; ▌Samuel Rosenthal (Republican) 29.4%
New York 4	Thomas H. Cullen	Democratic	1918	Incumbent re-elected.	▌ ✓ Thomas H. Cullen (Democratic) 56.2%; ▌Alfred A. LaRossa (Republican) 38.3%; ▌Michael Giaratano (American Labor) 5.5%
New York 5	Marcellus H. Evans	Democratic	1934	Incumbent lost renomination. Incumbent lost re-election as a Republican. Democratic hold.	▌ ✓ James J. Heffernan (Democratic) 55.2%; ▌Marcellus H. Evans (Republican) 44.8%
New York 6	Andrew Lawrence Somers	Democratic	1924	Incumbent re-elected.	▌ ✓ Andrew Lawrence Somers (Democratic) 57.7%; ▌Alfred E. Buck (Republican) 25.9%; ▌Irving B. Altman (American Labor) 14.1%; ▌Thomas F. Dwyer (Communist) 2.3%
New York 7	John J. Delaney	Democratic	1931	Incumbent re-elected.	▌ ✓ John J. Delaney (Democratic) 72.8%; ▌Julius Reinlieb (Republican) 27.2%
New York 8	Donald L. O'Toole	Democratic	1936	Incumbent re-elected.	▌ ✓ Donald L. O'Toole (Democratic) 56.8%; ▌Jacob M. Offenhender (Republican) 27.1%; ▌Benjamin Brenner (American Labor) 13.8%; ▌Robert Minor (Communist) 2.3%
New York 9	Eugene James Keogh	Democratic	1936	Incumbent re-elected.	▌ ✓ Eugene James Keogh (Democratic) 57.7%; ▌William J. McGahie (Republican) 42.3%
New York 10	Emanuel Celler	Democratic	1922	Incumbent re-elected.	▌ ✓ Emanuel Celler (Democratic) 71.4%; ▌Edward H. Wilson (Republican) 26.6%; ▌Bessie Polonsky (Communist) 1.9%
New York 11	James A. O'Leary	Democratic	1934	Incumbent re-elected.	▌ ✓ James A. O'Leary (Democratic) 49.4%; ▌Thomas Garrett (Republican) 45.1%; ▌Wellington Roe (American Labor) 5.5%
New York 12	Samuel Dickstein	Democratic	1922	Incumbent re-elected.	▌ ✓ Samuel Dickstein (Democratic) 72.1%; ▌Bernard Harkavey (American Labor) 15.4%; ▌Joseph Levine (Republican) 12.5%
New York 13	Christopher D. Sullivan	Democratic	1916	Incumbent retired. Democratic hold.	▌ ✓ Louis Capozzoli (Democratic) 62.7%; ▌John Rosenberg (Republican) 28.6%; ▌Geno Bardi (American Labor) 8.7%
New York 14	Morris Michael Edelstein	Democratic	1940 (special)	Incumbent re-elected.	▌ ✓ Morris Michael Edelstein (Democratic) 56.9%; ▌Peter J. Bakanatch (Republican) 30.0%; ▌Samuel Burt (American Labor) 13.1%
New York 15	Michael J. Kennedy	Democratic	1938	Incumbent re-elected.	▌ ✓ Michael J. Kennedy (Democratic) 59.7%; ▌Arthur A. Wyler (Republican) 29.8%; ▌Joseph Curran (American Labor) 10.5%
New York 16	James H. Fay	Democratic	1938	Incumbent lost re-election. Republican gain.	▌ ✓ William T. Pheiffer (Republican) 48.7%; ▌James H. Fay (Democratic) 45.2%; ▌Thomas Darcey (American Labor) 6.1%
New York 17	Bruce Fairchild Barton	Republican	1937 (special)	Incumbent retired to run for U.S. senator. Republican hold.	▌ ✓ Kenneth F. Simpson (Republican) 51.1%; ▌Samuel Kramer (Democratic) 43.5%; ▌Morris Watson (American Labor) 5.4%
New York 18	Martin J. Kennedy	Democratic	1930	Incumbent re-elected.	▌ ✓ Martin J. Kennedy (Democratic) 52.7%; ▌James B. Walker Jr. (Republican) 41.2%; ▌Shaemas O'Sheel (American Labor) 6.1%
New York 19	Sol Bloom	Democratic	1923	Incumbent re-elected.	▌ ✓ Sol Bloom (Democratic) 62.8%; ▌Daniel J. Riesner (Republican) 29.0%; ▌Benjamin M. Zelman (American Labor) 8.1%
New York 20	Vito Marcantonio	Labor	1938	Incumbent re-elected.	▌ ✓ Vito Marcantonio (American Labor) 62.5%; ▌James J. Lanzetta (Democratic) 37.5%
New York 21	Joseph A. Gavagan	Democratic	1929	Incumbent re-elected.	▌ ✓ Joseph A. Gavagan (Democratic) 63.2%; ▌Charles H. Roberts (Republican) 27.1%; ▌Alfred K. Stern (American Labor) 9.7%
New York 22	Walter A. Lynch	Democratic	1940 (special)	Incumbent re-elected.	▌ ✓ Walter A. Lynch (Democratic) 60.1%; ▌F. Shepard Cornell (Republican) 31.9%; ▌Frank Crosswaith (American Labor) 8.0%
New York 23	Charles A. Buckley	Democratic	1934	Incumbent re-elected.	▌ ✓ Charles A. Buckley (Democratic) 56.5%; ▌Lowell H. Brown (Republican) 26.1%; ▌Jack Altman (American Labor) 14.9%; ▌Isidore Begun (Communist) 2.4%; ▌Max Shachtman (Workers) 0.1%
New York 24	James M. Fitzpatrick	Democratic	1926	Incumbent re-elected.	▌ ✓ James M. Fitzpatrick (Democratic) 47.7%; ▌Ralph W. Gwinn (Republican) 40.4%; ▌George Thomas (American Labor) 10.4%; ▌Antonio Lombardo (Communist) 1.6%
New York 25	Ralph A. Gamble	Republican	1937 (special)	Incumbent re-elected.	▌ ✓ Ralph A. Gamble (Republican) 64.0%; ▌Homer A. Stebbins (Democratic) 33.1%; ▌George O. Pershing (American Labor) 2.9%
New York 26	Hamilton Fish III	Republican	1920	Incumbent re-elected.	▌ ✓ Hamilton Fish III (Republican) 51.9%; ▌Hardy Steeholm (Democratic) 45.1%; ▌Con Miller (American Labor) 3.1%
New York 27	Lewis K. Rockefeller	Republican	1937 (special)	Incumbent re-elected.	▌ ✓ Lewis K. Rockefeller (Republican) 58.0%; ▌George J. Mutari (Democratic) 42.0%
New York 28	William T. Byrne	Democratic	1936	Incumbent re-elected.	▌ ✓ William T. Byrne (Democratic) 57.8%; ▌William V. A. Waterman (Republican) 38.3%; ▌Jack Davis (American Labor) 4.0%
New York 29	E. Harold Cluett	Republican	1936	Incumbent re-elected.	▌ ✓ E. Harold Cluett (Republican) 63.7%; ▌Salvatore J. Leombruno (Democratic) 33.7%; ▌Coleman B. Cheney (American Labor) 2.6%
New York 30	Frank Crowther	Republican	1918	Incumbent re-elected.	▌ ✓ Frank Crowther (Republican) 54.8%; ▌Burlin G. McKillip (Democratic) 42.5%; ▌John McMahon (American Labor) 2.7%
New York 31	Clarence E. Kilburn	Republican	1940 (special)	Incumbent re-elected.	▌ ✓ Clarence E. Kilburn (Republican) 62.5%; ▌Horatio W. Thomas (Democratic) 37.5%
New York 32	Francis D. Culkin	Republican	1928	Incumbent re-elected.	▌ ✓ Francis D. Culkin (Republican) 68.8%; ▌Frank W. McCormack (Democratic) 28.8%; ▌Clarence Stuber (American Labor) 2.4%
New York 33	Fred J. Douglas	Republican	1936	Incumbent re-elected.	▌ ✓ Fred J. Douglas (Republican) 56.4%; ▌Samuel H. Miller (Democratic) 40.9%; ▌Edward G. Cluney (American Labor) 2.7%
New York 34	Edwin Arthur Hall	Republican	1939 (special)	Incumbent re-elected.	▌ ✓ Edwin Arthur Hall (Republican) 68.3%; ▌Donald W. Kramer (Democratic) 29.8%; ▌William Livings (American Labor) 1.9%
New York 35	Clarence E. Hancock	Republican	1927	Incumbent re-elected.	▌ ✓ Clarence E. Hancock (Republican) 56.8%; ▌Flora D. Johnson (Democratic) 40.6%; ▌Walter Soule (American Labor) 2.6%
New York 36	John Taber	Republican	1922	Incumbent re-elected.	▌ ✓ John Taber (Republican) 59.6%; ▌John W. Kennelly (Democratic) 37.8%; ▌Walter Walczyck (American Labor) 2.6%
New York 37	W. Sterling Cole	Republican	1934	Incumbent re-elected.	▌ ✓ W. Sterling Cole (Republican) 64.9%; ▌David Moses (Democratic) 32.9%; ▌L. Cyrus Rigby (American Labor) 2.2%
New York 38	Joseph J. O'Brien	Republican	1938	Incumbent re-elected.	▌ ✓ Joseph J. O'Brien (Republican) 51.9%; ▌George B. Kelly (Democratic) 48.1%
New York 39	James W. Wadsworth Jr.	Republican	1932	Incumbent re-elected.	▌ ✓ James W. Wadsworth Jr. (Republican) 60.4%; ▌J. Frederick Colson (Democratic) 39.6%
New York 40	Walter G. Andrews	Republican	1930	Incumbent re-elected.	▌ ✓ Walter G. Andrews (Republican) 61.1%; ▌Robert A. Hoffman (Democratic) 38.9%
New York 41	J. Francis Harter	Republican	1938	Incumbent lost re-election. Democratic gain.	▌ ✓ Alfred F. Beiter (Democratic) 52.3%; ▌J. Francis Harter (Republican) 47.7%
New York 42	Pius Schwert	Democratic	1938	Incumbent re-elected.	▌ ✓ Pius Schwert (Democratic) 58.8%; ▌Edward F. Moss (Republican) 41.0%; ▌Mattie Green (Communist) 0.2%
New York 43	Daniel A. Reed	Republican	1918	Incumbent re-elected.	▌ ✓ Daniel A. Reed (Republican) 62.2%; ▌Milton A. Bissell (Democratic) 37.8%
New York at-large	Caroline O'Day	Democratic	1934	Incumbent re-elected.	▌ ✓ Caroline O'Day (Democratic) 26.6%; ▌Matthew J. Merritt (Democratic) 26.4%; ▌Mary H. Donlon (Republican) 23.5%; ▌Messmore Kendall (Republican) 23.4%; ▌Helen G. H. Estelle (Prohibition) 0.05%; ▌Neil Dow Cranmer (Prohibition) 0.04%
New York at-large	Matthew J. Merritt	Democratic	1934	Incumbent re-elected.	▌ ✓ Caroline O'Day (Democratic) 26.6%; ▌Matthew J. Merritt (Democratic) 26.4%; ▌Mary H. Donlon (Republican) 23.5%; ▌Messmore Kendall (Republican) 23.4%; ▌Helen G. H. Estelle (Prohibition) 0.05%; ▌Neil Dow Cranmer (Prohibition) 0.04%

== North Carolina ==
District	Incumbent			This race	
District	Member	Party	First elected	Results	Candidates
North Carolina 1	Lindsay C. Warren	Democratic	1924	Incumbent resigned to become Comptroller General. Democratic hold.	▌ ✓ Herbert Covington Bonner (Democratic) 92.8%; ▌John A. Wilkinson (Republican) 7.2%
North Carolina 2	John H. Kerr	Democratic	1923	Incumbent re-elected.	▌ ✓ John H. Kerr (Democratic); Uncontested
North Carolina 3	Graham Arthur Barden	Democratic	1934	Incumbent re-elected.	▌ ✓ Graham Arthur Barden (Democratic) 75.0%; ▌Julian T. Gaskill (Republican) 25.0%
North Carolina 4	Harold D. Cooley	Democratic	1934	Incumbent re-elected.	▌ ✓ Harold D. Cooley (Democratic) 79.4%; ▌Ezra Parker (Republican) 20.6%
North Carolina 5	Alonzo Dillard Folger	Democratic	1938	Incumbent re-elected.	▌ ✓ Alonzo Dillard Folger (Democratic) 77.2%; ▌Ottis James Reynolds (Republican) 22.8%
North Carolina 6	Carl T. Durham	Democratic	1938	Incumbent re-elected.	▌ ✓ Carl T. Durham (Democratic) 78.5%; ▌Gilliam Grissom (Independent) 21.5%
North Carolina 7	J. Bayard Clark	Democratic	1928	Incumbent re-elected.	▌ ✓ J. Bayard Clark (Democratic) 85.3%; ▌Fred R. Keith (Republican) 14.7%
North Carolina 8	William O. Burgin	Democratic	1938	Incumbent re-elected.	▌ ✓ William O. Burgin (Democratic) 67.2%; ▌F. D. B. Harding (Republican) 32.8%
North Carolina 9	Robert L. Doughton	Democratic	1910	Incumbent re-elected.	▌ ✓ Robert L. Doughton (Democratic) 68.3%; ▌Monroe Adams (Republican) 31.7%
North Carolina 10	Alfred L. Bulwinkle	Democratic	1930	Incumbent re-elected.	▌ ✓ Alfred L. Bulwinkle (Democratic) 69.8%; ▌Ernest M. Morgan (Republican) 30.2%
North Carolina 11	Zebulon Weaver	Democratic	1930	Incumbent re-elected.	▌ ✓ Zebulon Weaver (Democratic) 69.0%; ▌Robert Frank Jarrett (Republican) 31.0%

== North Dakota ==
District	Incumbent			This race	
District	Member	Party	First elected	Results	Candidates
North Dakota at-large	Usher L. Burdick	Republican-NPL	1934	Incumbent re-elected.	▌ ✓ Usher L. Burdick (Republican-NPL) 34.4%; ▌ ✓ Charles R. Robertson (Republican) 25.8%; ▌R. J. Downey (Democratic) 14.8%; ▌Adolph Michelson (Democratic) 14.6%; ▌Thomas Hall (Independent) 5.4%; ▌John Omland (Independent) 4.8%
North Dakota at-large	William Lemke	Republican-NPL	1932	Incumbent retired to run for U.S. senator. Republican hold.	▌ ✓ Usher L. Burdick (Republican-NPL) 34.4%; ▌ ✓ Charles R. Robertson (Republican) 25.8%; ▌R. J. Downey (Democratic) 14.8%; ▌Adolph Michelson (Democratic) 14.6%; ▌Thomas Hall (Independent) 5.4%; ▌John Omland (Independent) 4.8%

== Ohio ==
District	Incumbent			This race	
District	Member	Party	First elected	Results	Candidates
Ohio 1	Charles H. Elston	Republican	1938	Incumbent re-elected.	▌ ✓ Charles H. Elston (Republican) 58.0%; ▌Joseph A. Dixon (Democratic) 42.0%
Ohio 2	William E. Hess	Republican	1938	Incumbent re-elected.	▌ ✓ William E. Hess (Republican) 56.3%; ▌James E. O'Connell (Democratic) 43.7%
Ohio 3	Harry N. Routzohn	Republican	1938	Incumbent lost re-election. Democratic gain.	▌ ✓ Greg J. Holbrock (Democratic) 52.6%; ▌Harry N. Routzohn (Republican) 47.4%
Ohio 4	Robert Franklin Jones	Republican	1938	Incumbent re-elected.	▌ ✓ Robert Franklin Jones (Republican) 57.8%; ▌Clarence C. Miller (Democratic) 42.2%
Ohio 5	Cliff Clevenger	Republican	1938	Incumbent re-elected.	▌ ✓ Cliff Clevenger (Republican) 60.7%; ▌C. H. Armbruater (Democratic) 39.3%
Ohio 6	James G. Polk	Democratic	1930	Incumbent retired. Democratic hold.	▌ ✓ Jacob E. Davis (Democratic) 52.2%; ▌Chester P. Fitch (Republican) 47.8%
Ohio 7	Clarence J. Brown	Republican	1938	Incumbent re-elected.	▌ ✓ Clarence J. Brown (Republican) 58.3%; ▌J. Fuller Trump (Democratic) 41.7%
Ohio 8	Frederick C. Smith	Republican	1938	Incumbent re-elected.	▌ ✓ Frederick C. Smith (Republican) 52.5%; ▌Kenneth M. Petri (Democratic) 47.5%
Ohio 9	John F. Hunter	Democratic	1936	Incumbent re-elected.	▌ ✓ John F. Hunter (Democratic) 54.7%; ▌Wilbur M. White (Republican) 45.3%
Ohio 10	Thomas A. Jenkins	Republican	1924	Incumbent re-elected.	▌ ✓ Thomas A. Jenkins (Republican) 58.9%; ▌John P. Kelso (Democratic) 41.1%
Ohio 11	Harold K. Claypool	Democratic	1936	Incumbent re-elected.	▌ ✓ Harold K. Claypool (Democratic) 53.8%; ▌Ray W. Davis (Republican) 46.2%
Ohio 12	John M. Vorys	Republican	1938	Incumbent re-elected.	▌ ✓ John M. Vorys (Republican) 51.3%; ▌Arthur P. Lamneck (Democratic) 48.7%
Ohio 13	Dudley A. White	Republican	1936	Incumbent retired to run for U.S. senator. Republican hold.	▌ ✓ Albert David Baumhart Jr. (Republican) 60.8%; ▌Werner S. Haslinger (Democratic) 39.2%
Ohio 14	Dow W. Harter	Democratic	1932	Incumbent re-elected.	▌ ✓ Dow W. Harter (Democratic) 52.3%; ▌Walter B. Wanamaker (Republican) 46.6%; ▌Cornelius Kohlmyer (Independent) 1.1%
Ohio 15	Robert T. Secrest	Democratic	1932	Incumbent re-elected.	▌ ✓ Robert T. Secrest (Democratic) 58.8%; ▌Clair A. Young (Republican) 41.2%
Ohio 16	James Seccombe	Republican	1938	Incumbent lost re-election. Democratic gain.	▌ ✓ William R. Thom (Democratic) 56.3%; ▌James Seccombe (Republican) 43.7%
Ohio 17	J. Harry McGregor	Republican	1940	Incumbent re-elected.	▌ ✓ J. Harry McGregor (Republican) 55.1%; ▌Ralph C. Lutz (Democratic) 44.9%
Ohio 18	Earl R. Lewis	Republican	1938	Incumbent lost re-election. Democratic gain.	▌ ✓ Lawrence E. Imhoff (Democratic) 54.5%; ▌Earl R. Lewis (Republican) 45.5%
Ohio 19	Michael J. Kirwan	Democratic	1936	Incumbent re-elected.	▌ ✓ Michael J. Kirwan (Democratic) 61.9%; ▌Charles H. Anderson (Republican) 38.1%
Ohio 20	Martin L. Sweeney	Democratic	1931	Incumbent re-elected.	▌ ✓ Martin L. Sweeney (Democratic) 67.7%; ▌George Pillersdorf (Republican) 32.3%
Ohio 21	Robert Crosser	Democratic	1922	Incumbent re-elected.	▌ ✓ Robert Crosser (Democratic) 77.1%; ▌J. E. Chizek (Republican) 22.9%
Ohio 22	Frances P. Bolton	Republican	1940	Incumbent re-elected.	▌ ✓ Frances P. Bolton (Republican) 56.7%; ▌Anthony A. Fleger (Democratic) 43.3%
Ohio at-large	George H. Bender	Republican	1938	Incumbent re-elected.	▌ ✓ George H. Bender (Republican) 26.3%; ▌ ✓ Stephen M. Young (Democratic) 25.7%; ▌L. L. Marshall (Republican) 24.0%; ▌Francis W. Durbin (Democratic) 24.0%
Ohio at-large	L. L. Marshall	Republican	1938	Incumbent lost re-election. Democratic gain.	▌ ✓ George H. Bender (Republican) 26.3%; ▌ ✓ Stephen M. Young (Democratic) 25.7%; ▌L. L. Marshall (Republican) 24.0%; ▌Francis W. Durbin (Democratic) 24.0%

== Oklahoma ==
District	Incumbent			This race	
District	Member	Party	First elected	Results	Candidates
Oklahoma 1	Wesley E. Disney	Democratic	1930	Incumbent re-elected.	▌ ✓ Wesley E. Disney (Democratic) 62.2%; ▌W. R. Boyd (Republican) 37.4%; ▌Martha A. Morrison (Prohibition) 0.3%; ▌Bill Edwards (Independent) 0.1%
Oklahoma 2	John Conover Nichols	Democratic	1934	Incumbent re-elected.	▌ ✓ John Conover Nichols (Democratic) 62.2%; ▌E. O. Clark (Republican) 37.8%
Oklahoma 3	Wilburn Cartwright	Democratic	1926	Incumbent re-elected.	▌ ✓ Wilburn Cartwright (Democratic) 79.0%; ▌Frank D. McSherry (Republican) 21.0%
Oklahoma 4	Lyle Boren	Democratic	1936	Incumbent re-elected.	▌ ✓ Lyle Boren (Democratic) 71.1%; ▌Clyde T. Patrick (Republican) 28.9%
Oklahoma 5	Mike Monroney	Democratic	1938	Incumbent re-elected.	▌ ✓ Mike Monroney (Democratic) 72.4%; ▌U. S. Stone (Republican) 27.1%; ▌Lizzie Varvil (Prohibition) 0.4%; ▌John Franing (Independent) 0.1%
Oklahoma 6	Jed Johnson	Democratic	1926	Incumbent re-elected.	▌ ✓ Jed Johnson (Democratic) 70.1%; ▌Walter Hubbell (Republican) 29.9%
Oklahoma 7	Sam C. Massingale	Democratic	1934	Incumbent re-elected.	▌ ✓ Sam C. Massingale (Democratic) 70.0%; ▌Place Montgomery (Republican) 28.5%; ▌T. H. McLemore (Independent) 1.5%
Oklahoma 8	Phil Ferguson	Democratic	1934	Incumbent lost re-election. Republican gain.	▌ ✓ Ross Rizley (Republican) 53.8%; ▌Phil Ferguson (Democratic) 45.7%; ▌Ralph E. Butterfield (Prohibition) 0.4%
Oklahoma at-large	Will Rogers	Democratic	1932	Incumbent re-elected.	▌ ✓ Will Rogers (Democratic) 65.7%; ▌John W. Harreld (Republican) 33.6%; ▌E. W. Fickinger (Prohibition) 0.4%; ▌Robert Wood (Independent) 0.2%

== Oregon ==
District	Incumbent			This race	
District	Member	Party	First elected	Results	Candidates
Oregon 1	James W. Mott	Republican	1932	Incumbent re-elected.	▌ ✓ James W. Mott (Republican) 68.3%; ▌Charles A. Robertson (Democratic) 30.0%; ▌Upton A. Upton (Socialist Labor) 1.7%
Oregon 2	Walter M. Pierce	Democratic	1932	Incumbent re-elected.	▌ ✓ Walter M. Pierce (Democratic) 56.2%; ▌Rex Ellis (Republican) 42.1%; ▌Pauline Sears (Socialist Labor) 1.7%
Oregon 3	Homer D. Angell	Republican	1938	Incumbent re-elected.	▌ ✓ Homer D. Angell (Republican) 49.9%; ▌Nan Wood Honeyman (Democratic) 47.9%; ▌H. H. Stallard (Independent) 1.6%; ▌Lester E. Harnden (Socialist Labor) 0.7%

== Pennsylvania ==
District	Incumbent			This race	
District	Member	Party	First elected	Results	Candidates
Pennsylvania 1	Leon Sacks	Democratic	1936	Incumbent re-elected.	▌ ✓ Leon Sacks (Democratic) 61.6%; ▌Emanuel W. Beloff (Republican) 38.0%; ▌Frank Mozer (Communist) 0.2%; ▌George Silver (Socialist) 0.2%
Pennsylvania 2	James P. McGranery	Democratic	1936	Incumbent re-elected.	▌ ✓ James P. McGranery (Democratic) 60.9%; ▌Augustus Trask Ashton (Republican) 38.3%; ▌Ella Bloor Omholt (Communist) 0.4%; ▌Hyman Siegel (Socialist) 0.2%; ▌B. A. Jackson (No Wage Tax) 0.1%; ▌L. McCabe Johnson (Prohibition) 0.07%
Pennsylvania 3	Michael J. Bradley	Democratic	1936	Incumbent re-elected.	▌ ✓ Michael J. Bradley (Democratic) 63.1%; ▌Frank J. Kownacki (Republican) 36.5%; ▌Joseph Backer (Socialist) 0.2%; ▌Thomas Nabried (Communist) 0.2%
Pennsylvania 4	John E. Sheridan	Democratic	1939 (special)	Incumbent re-elected.	▌ ✓ John E. Sheridan (Democratic) 63.0%; ▌Benjamin M. Golder (Republican) 36.0%; ▌Norris G. Wood (Communist) 0.3%; ▌William E. Martin (Socialist) 0.3%; ▌Harry L. Neal (State Rights) 0.2%; ▌John Cunningham (American Way) 0.06%
Pennsylvania 5	Fred C. Gartner	Republican	1938	Incumbent lost re-election. Democratic gain.	▌ ✓ Francis R. Smith (Democratic) 55.8%; ▌Fred C. Gartner (Republican) 43.7%; ▌Bernard Samoff (Socialist) 0.3%; ▌Harry Casey (Communist) 0.1%; ▌Oscar W. Wall (Prohibition) 0.08%
Pennsylvania 6	Francis J. Myers	Democratic	1938	Incumbent re-elected.	▌ ✓ Francis J. Myers (Democratic) 61.1%; ▌Frank Truscott (Republican) 38.0%; ▌Harold B. Hatfield (No Wage Tax) 0.5%; ▌Joseph Dougher (Communist) 0.2%; ▌Edward Gallob (Socialist) 0.1%
Pennsylvania 7	George P. Darrow	Republican	1938	Incumbent retired. Republican hold.	▌ ✓ Hugh Scott (Republican) 50.9%; ▌Gilbert Cassidy (Democratic) 48.8%; ▌William O'Reilly (Socialist) 0.3%
Pennsylvania 8	James Wolfenden	Republican	1928	Incumbent re-elected.	▌ ✓ James Wolfenden (Republican) 57.6%; ▌E. Adele Scott Saul (Democratic) 42.2%; ▌Charles Palmer (Prohibition) 0.2%
Pennsylvania 9	Charles L. Gerlach	Republican	1938	Incumbent re-elected.	▌ ✓ Charles L. Gerlach (Republican) 52.4%; ▌Henry V. Scheirer (Democratic) 47.4%; ▌Byron Mayberry (Prohibition) 0.2%
Pennsylvania 10	J. Roland Kinzer	Republican	1930	Incumbent re-elected.	▌ ✓ J. Roland Kinzer (Republican) 57.7%; ▌George M. May (Democratic) 42.2%; ▌John Granville Eddy (Communist) 0.08%
Pennsylvania 11	Patrick J. Boland	Democratic	1930	Incumbent re-elected.	▌ ✓ Patrick J. Boland (Democratic) 52.6%; ▌Joseph F. Gunster (Republican) 47.4%
Pennsylvania 12	J. Harold Flannery	Democratic	1936	Incumbent re-elected.	▌ ✓ J. Harold Flannery (Democratic) 57.8%; ▌J. Henry Pool (Republican) 42.2%
Pennsylvania 13	Ivor D. Fenton	Republican	1938	Incumbent re-elected.	▌ ✓ Ivor D. Fenton (Republican) 50.5%; ▌James H. Gildea (Democratic) 48.9%; ▌Robert J. Lesser (Independent) 0.6%
Pennsylvania 14	Guy L. Moser	Democratic	1936	Incumbent re-elected.	▌ ✓ Guy L. Moser (Democratic) 56.0%; ▌John C. Evans (Republican) 37.0%; ▌Raymond S. Hofses (Socialist) 5.8%; ▌Harry A. Obold (Independent) 0.8%; ▌William N. Stottlemyer (Prohibition) 0.2%; ▌Ben Rubin (Communist) 0.1%
Pennsylvania 15	Albert G. Rutherford	Republican	1936	Incumbent re-elected.	▌ ✓ Albert G. Rutherford (Republican) 60.4%; ▌F. R. Clark (Democratic) 39.2%; ▌Fred P. Millington (Prohibition) 0.4%
Pennsylvania 16	Robert F. Rich	Republican	1930	Incumbent re-elected.	▌ ✓ Robert F. Rich (Republican) 60.5%; ▌Hugh Gilmore (Democratic) 39.5%
Pennsylvania 17	J. William Ditter	Republican	1932	Incumbent re-elected.	▌ ✓ J. William Ditter (Republican) 62.2%; ▌Victor Eppstein (Democratic) 37.8%
Pennsylvania 18	Richard M. Simpson	Republican	1937 (special)	Incumbent re-elected.	▌ ✓ Richard M. Simpson (Republican) 57.6%; ▌John M. Keichline (Democratic) 42.4%
Pennsylvania 19	John C. Kunkel	Republican	1938	Incumbent re-elected.	▌ ✓ John C. Kunkel (Republican) 54.4%; ▌John A. Smith (Democratic) 45.6%
Pennsylvania 20	Benjamin Jarrett	Republican	1936	Incumbent re-elected.	▌ ✓ Benjamin Jarrett (Republican) 58.2%; ▌John R. Boland Jr. (Democratic) 40.8%; ▌Robert G. Burnham (Prohibition) 1.0%
Pennsylvania 21	Francis E. Walter	Democratic	1932	Incumbent re-elected.	▌ ✓ Francis E. Walter (Democratic) 56.2%; ▌T. Fred Woodley (Republican) 43.7%; ▌Walter M. Trumbull (Communist) 0.1%
Pennsylvania 22	Chester H. Gross	Republican	1938	Incumbent lost re-election. Democratic gain.	▌ ✓ Harry L. Haines (Democratic) 54.8%; ▌Chester H. Gross (Republican) 44.6%; ▌Raymond N. Fehl (Republican) 0.5%
Pennsylvania 23	James E. Van Zandt	Republican	1938	Incumbent re-elected.	▌ ✓ James E. Van Zandt (Republican) 56.3%; ▌William M. Aukerman (Democratic) 43.7%
Pennsylvania 24	J. Buell Snyder	Democratic	1932	Incumbent re-elected.	▌ ✓ J. Buell Snyder (Democratic) 56.6%; ▌J. Clarke Glassburn (Republican) 43.2%; ▌Minnie B. Shaulis (Prohibition) 0.2%
Pennsylvania 25	Charles I. Faddis	Democratic	1932	Incumbent re-elected.	▌ ✓ Charles I. Faddis (Democratic) 61.0%; ▌Lucius McK. Crumrine (Republican) 39.0%
Pennsylvania 26	Louis E. Graham	Republican	1938	Incumbent re-elected.	▌ ✓ Louis E. Graham (Republican) 50.9%; ▌Peter P. Reising (Democratic) 49.1%
Pennsylvania 27	Harve Tibbott	Republican	1938	Incumbent re-elected.	▌ ✓ Harve Tibbott (Republican) 51.6%; ▌Joseph Anthony Gray (Democratic) 47.8%; ▌James O. Archer (Prohibition) 0.5%
Pennsylvania 28	Robert G. Allen	Democratic	1936	Incumbent retired. Democratic hold.	▌ ✓ Augustine B. Kelley (Democratic) 55.4%; ▌James M. Underwood (Republican) 42.0%; ▌A. F. Daughenbaugh (Prog. Labor) 2.1%; ▌S. W. Bierer (Prohibition) 0.5%
Pennsylvania 29	Robert L. Rodgers	Republican	1938	Incumbent re-elected.	▌ ✓ Robert L. Rodgers (Republican) 54.2%; ▌James F. Lavery (Democratic) 45.4%; ▌Ira M. Ramsey (Prohibition) 0.4%
Pennsylvania 30	Robert J. Corbett	Republican	1938	Incumbent lost re-election. Democratic gain.	▌ ✓ Thomas E. Scanlon (Democratic) 50.1%; ▌Robert J. Corbett (Republican) 49.9%
Pennsylvania 31	John McDowell	Republican	1938	Incumbent lost re-election. Democratic gain.	▌ ✓ Samuel A. Weiss (Democratic) 55.7%; ▌John McDowell (Republican) 43.5%; ▌M. J. Dibble (Prohibition) 0.3%; ▌George Bush (Prog. Labor) 0.3%; ▌Ben Findley (Communist) 0.2%
Pennsylvania 32	Herman P. Eberharter	Democratic	1936	Incumbent re-elected.	▌ ✓ Herman P. Eberharter (Democratic) 68.6%; ▌Samuel M. Jackson (Republican) 31.1%; ▌H. Joseph Filner (Communist) 0.2%
Pennsylvania 33	Joseph A. McArdle	Democratic	1938	Incumbent re-elected.	▌ ✓ Joseph A. McArdle (Democratic) 55.0%; ▌James I. Marsh (Republican) 44.9%; ▌Charles A. Brown (Prohibition) 0.1%
Pennsylvania 34	Matthew A. Dunn	Democratic	1932	Incumbent retired. Democratic hold.	▌ ✓ James A. Wright (Democratic) 53.8%; ▌Robert B. McKinley (Republican) 46.2%

== Rhode Island ==
District	Incumbent			This race	
District	Member	Party	First elected	Results	Candidates
Rhode Island 1	Charles Risk	Republican	1938	Incumbent lost re-election. Democratic gain.	▌ ✓ Aime Forand (Democratic) 57.5%; ▌Charles Risk (Republican) 42.5%
Rhode Island 2	Harry Sandager	Republican	1938	Incumbent lost re-election. Democratic gain.	▌ ✓ John E. Fogarty (Democratic) 53.8%; ▌Harry Sandager (Republican) 46.2%

== South Carolina ==
District	Incumbent			This race	
District	Member	Party	First elected	Results	Candidates
South Carolina 1	Clara G. McMillan	Democratic	1939 (special)	Incumbent retired. Democratic hold.	▌ ✓ L. Mendel Rivers (Democratic) 98.4%; ▌Mrs. J. E. Messervy (Republican) 1.6%
South Carolina 2	Hampton P. Fulmer	Democratic	1920	Incumbent re-elected.	▌ ✓ Hampton P. Fulmer (Democratic) 98.6%; ▌M. B. Cross (Republican) 1.4%
South Carolina 3	Butler B. Hare	Democratic	1938	Incumbent re-elected.	▌ ✓ Butler B. Hare (Democratic) 99.3%; ▌A. F. Ernest (Republican) 0.7%
South Carolina 4	Joseph R. Bryson	Democratic	1938	Incumbent re-elected.	▌ ✓ Joseph R. Bryson (Democratic) 97.3%; ▌James D. McCullough (Republican) 2.7%
South Carolina 5	James P. Richards	Democratic	1932	Incumbent re-elected.	▌ ✓ James P. Richards (Democratic) 99.2%; ▌C. F. Pendleton (Republican) 0.8%; ▌J. Bates Gerald (Independent) 0.03%
South Carolina 6	John L. McMillan	Democratic	1938	Incumbent re-elected.	▌ ✓ John L. McMillan (Democratic) 99.0%; ▌C. B. Ruffin (Republican) 1.0%

== South Dakota ==
District	Incumbent			This race	
District	Member	Party	First elected	Results	Candidates
South Dakota 1	Karl Mundt	Republican	1938	Incumbent re-elected.	▌ ✓ Karl Mundt (Republican) 59.6%; ▌Oscar Fosheim (Democratic) 40.4%
South Dakota 2	Francis Case	Republican	1936	Incumbent re-elected.	▌ ✓ Francis Case (Republican) 66.1%; ▌Arthur W. Watwood (Democratic) 33.9%

== Tennessee ==
District	Incumbent			This race	
District	Member	Party	First elected	Results	Candidates
Tennessee 1	B. Carroll Reece	Republican	1932	Incumbent re-elected.	▌ ✓ B. Carroll Reece (Republican) 68.7%; ▌Robert E. Walker (Democratic) 31.3%
Tennessee 2	John Jennings	Republican	1939 (special)	Incumbent re-elected.	▌ ✓ John Jennings (Republican) 56.6%; ▌Clay James (Democratic) 43.4%
Tennessee 3	Estes Kefauver	Democratic	1939 (special)	Incumbent re-elected.	▌ ✓ Estes Kefauver (Democratic) 68.7%; ▌Jerome Taylor (Republican) 31.3%
Tennessee 4	Albert Gore Sr.	Democratic	1938	Incumbent re-elected.	▌ ✓ Albert Gore Sr. (Democratic) 88.9%; ▌H. E. McLean (Republican) 11.1%
Tennessee 5	Joseph W. Byrns Jr.	Democratic	1938	Incumbent lost re-election. Independent gain. Winner subsequently joined Democratic caucus.	▌ ✓ Percy Priest (Independent) 50.2%; ▌Joseph W. Byrns Jr. (Democratic) 42.8%; ▌Julian H. Campbell (Republican) 7.1%
Tennessee 6	W. Wirt Courtney	Democratic	1939 (special)	Incumbent re-elected.	▌ ✓ W. Wirt Courtney (Democratic); Uncontested
Tennessee 7	Herron C. Pearson	Democratic	1934	Incumbent re-elected.	▌ ✓ Herron C. Pearson (Democratic); Uncontested
Tennessee 8	Jere Cooper	Democratic	1928	Incumbent re-elected.	▌ ✓ Jere Cooper (Democratic) 92.1%; ▌Julian Palmer (Independent) 7.9%
Tennessee 9	Clifford Davis	Democratic	1940 (special)	Incumbent re-elected.	▌ ✓ Clifford Davis (Democratic) 96.0%; ▌Theo Wynn Larwill (Independent) 4.0%

== Texas ==
District	Incumbent			This race	
District	Member	Party	First elected	Results	Candidates
Texas 1	Wright Patman	Democratic	1928	Incumbent re-elected.	▌ ✓ Wright Patman (Democratic); Uncontested
Texas 2	Martin Dies Jr.	Democratic	1930	Incumbent re-elected.	▌ ✓ Martin Dies Jr. (Democratic); Uncontested
Texas 3	Lindley Beckworth	Democratic	1938	Incumbent re-elected.	▌ ✓ Lindley Beckworth (Democratic); Uncontested
Texas 4	Sam Rayburn	Democratic	1912	Incumbent re-elected.	▌ ✓ Sam Rayburn (Democratic); Uncontested
Texas 5	Hatton W. Sumners	Democratic	1914	Incumbent re-elected.	▌ ✓ Hatton W. Sumners (Democratic) 87.5%; ▌Floyd B. Royer (Republican) 12.5%
Texas 6	Luther A. Johnson	Democratic	1922	Incumbent re-elected.	▌ ✓ Luther A. Johnson (Democratic); Uncontested
Texas 7	Nat Patton	Democratic	1934	Incumbent re-elected.	▌ ✓ Nat Patton (Democratic) 98.2%; ▌Dudley Lawson (Republican) 1.8%
Texas 8	Albert Thomas	Democratic	1936	Incumbent re-elected.	▌ ✓ Albert Thomas (Democratic) 94.8%; ▌M. U. S. Kjorlang (Republican) 5.2%
Texas 9	Joseph J. Mansfield	Democratic	1916	Incumbent re-elected.	▌ ✓ Joseph J. Mansfield (Democratic); Uncontested
Texas 10	Lyndon B. Johnson	Democratic	1937 (special)	Incumbent re-elected.	▌ ✓ Lyndon B. Johnson (Democratic); Uncontested
Texas 11	William R. Poage	Democratic	1936	Incumbent re-elected.	▌ ✓ William R. Poage (Democratic); Uncontested
Texas 12	Fritz G. Lanham	Democratic	1919	Incumbent re-elected.	▌ ✓ Fritz G. Lanham (Democratic); Uncontested
Texas 13	Ed Gossett	Democratic	1938	Incumbent re-elected.	▌ ✓ Ed Gossett (Democratic) 96.4%; ▌Louis N. Gould (Republican) 3.6%
Texas 14	Richard M. Kleberg	Democratic	1931	Incumbent re-elected.	▌ ✓ Richard M. Kleberg (Democratic); Uncontested
Texas 15	Milton H. West	Democratic	1933 (special)	Incumbent re-elected.	▌ ✓ Milton H. West (Democratic) 92.4%; ▌J. A. Simpson (Republican) 7.6%
Texas 16	R. Ewing Thomason	Democratic	1930	Incumbent re-elected.	▌ ✓ R. Ewing Thomason (Democratic); Uncontested
Texas 17	Clyde L. Garrett	Democratic	1936	Incumbent lost renomination. Democratic hold.	▌ ✓ Sam M. Russell (Democratic); Uncontested
Texas 18	John Marvin Jones	Democratic	1916	Incumbent retired to become a U.S. Court of Claims judge. Democratic hold.	▌ ✓ Eugene Worley (Democratic) 96.5%; ▌John W. Beveridge (Republican) 3.5%
Texas 19	George H. Mahon	Democratic	1934	Incumbent re-elected.	▌ ✓ George H. Mahon (Democratic); Uncontested
Texas 20	Paul J. Kilday	Democratic	1938	Incumbent re-elected.	▌ ✓ Paul J. Kilday (Democratic) 83.4%; ▌Harry Hotchkin (Republican) 16.5%; ▌Emma Tenayuca (Communist) 0.1%
Texas 21	Charles L. South	Democratic	1934	Incumbent re-elected.	▌ ✓ Charles L. South (Democratic) 92.8%; ▌Ray Ridenhour (Republican) 7.2%

== Utah ==
District	Incumbent			This race	
District	Member	Party	First elected	Results	Candidates
Utah 1	Abe Murdock	Democratic	1932	Incumbent retired to run for U.S. senator. Democratic hold.	▌ ✓ Walter K. Granger (Democratic) 57.1%; ▌LeRoy B. Young (Republican) 42.9%
Utah 2	J. W. Robinson	Democratic	1932	Incumbent re-elected.	▌ ✓ J. W. Robinson (Democratic) 63.3%; ▌A. Sherman Christenson (Republican) 36.7%

== Vermont ==
District	Incumbent			This race	
District	Member	Party	First elected	Results	Candidates
Vermont at-large	Charles Albert Plumley	Republican	1934	Incumbent re-elected.	▌ ✓ Charles Albert Plumley (Republican) 63.8%; ▌Michael J. Rock (Democratic) 36.2%

== Virginia ==
District	Incumbent			This race	
District	Member	Party	First elected	Results	Candidates
Virginia 1	S. Otis Bland	Democratic	1918	Incumbent re-elected.	▌ ✓ S. Otis Bland (Democratic); Uncontested
Virginia 2	Colgate Darden	Democratic	1938	Incumbent re-elected.	▌ ✓ Colgate Darden (Democratic); Uncontested
Virginia 3	Dave E. Satterfield Jr.	Democratic	1937 (special)	Incumbent re-elected.	▌ ✓ Dave E. Satterfield Jr. (Democratic) 96.9%; ▌Winston Dawson (Independent) 3.1%
Virginia 4	Patrick H. Drewry	Democratic	1920	Incumbent re-elected.	▌ ✓ Patrick H. Drewry (Democratic) 96.0%; ▌Cyrus Hotchkiss (Socialist) 4.0%
Virginia 5	Thomas G. Burch	Democratic	1930	Incumbent re-elected.	▌ ✓ Thomas G. Burch (Democratic); Uncontested
Virginia 6	Clifton A. Woodrum	Democratic	1922	Incumbent re-elected.	▌ ✓ Clifton A. Woodrum (Democratic) 68.1%; ▌Fred W. McWane (Republican) 31.4%; ▌Lawrence S. Wilkes (Socialist) 0.4%
Virginia 7	A. Willis Robertson	Democratic	1932	Incumbent re-elected.	▌ ✓ A. Willis Robertson (Democratic) 65.1%; ▌Jacob A. Garber (Republican) 34.7%; ▌Lester Ruffner (Communist) 0.2%
Virginia 8	Howard W. Smith	Democratic	1930	Incumbent re-elected.	▌ ✓ Howard W. Smith (Democratic) 79.0%; ▌Henry B. Goodloe (Republican) 21.0%
Virginia 9	John W. Flannagan Jr.	Democratic	1930	Incumbent re-elected.	▌ ✓ John W. Flannagan Jr. (Democratic) 57.3%; ▌Fred C. Parks (Republican) 42.7%

== Washington ==
District	Incumbent			This race	
District	Member	Party	First elected	Results	Candidates
Washington 1	Warren Magnuson	Democratic	1936	Incumbent re-elected.	▌ ✓ Warren Magnuson (Democratic) 61.6%; ▌Fred J. Wettrick (Republican) 38.4%
Washington 2	Monrad Wallgren	Democratic	1932	Incumbent retired to run for U.S. senator. Democratic hold.	▌ ✓ Henry M. Jackson (Democratic) 57.4%; ▌Payson Peterson (Republican) 42.6%
Washington 3	Martin F. Smith	Democratic	1932	Incumbent re-elected.	▌ ✓ Martin F. Smith (Democratic) 55.3%; ▌Russell V. Mack (Republican) 44.5%; ▌Henry P. Huff (Communist) 0.2%
Washington 4	Knute Hill	Democratic	1932	Incumbent re-elected.	▌ ✓ Knute Hill (Democratic) 51.3%; ▌Frank Miller (Republican) 48.7%
Washington 5	Charles H. Leavy	Democratic	1936	Incumbent re-elected.	▌ ✓ Charles H. Leavy (Democratic) 55.5%; ▌Walt Horan (Republican) 44.5%
Washington 6	John M. Coffee	Democratic	1936	Incumbent re-elected.	▌ ✓ John M. Coffee (Democratic) 62.8%; ▌Paul A. Preus (Republican) 37.2%

== West Virginia ==
District	Incumbent			This race	
District	Member	Party	First elected	Results	Candidates
West Virginia 1	A. C. Schiffler	Republican	1938	Incumbent lost re-election. Democratic gain.	▌ ✓ Robert L. Ramsay (Democratic) 53.2%; ▌A. C. Schiffler (Republican) 46.8%
West Virginia 2	Jennings Randolph	Democratic	1932	Incumbent re-elected.	▌ ✓ Jennings Randolph (Democratic) 57.5%; ▌H. Sharp Summers (Republican) 42.5%
West Virginia 3	Andrew Edmiston Jr.	Democratic	1933 (special)	Incumbent re-elected.	▌ ✓ Andrew Edmiston Jr. (Democratic) 56.6%; ▌H. Roy Waugh (Republican) 43.4%
West Virginia 4	George W. Johnson	Democratic	1932	Incumbent re-elected.	▌ ✓ George W. Johnson (Democratic) 52.7%; ▌Harry O. Hiteshew (Republican) 47.3%
West Virginia 5	John Kee	Democratic	1932	Incumbent re-elected.	▌ ✓ John Kee (Democratic) 62.9%; ▌Hartley Sanders (Republican) 37.1%
West Virginia 6	Joe L. Smith	Democratic	1928	Incumbent re-elected.	▌ ✓ Joe L. Smith (Democratic) 61.7%; ▌R. E. O'Connor (Republican) 38.3%

== Wisconsin ==
District	Incumbent			This race	
District	Member	Party	First elected	Results	Candidates
Wisconsin 1	Stephen Bolles	Republican	1938	Incumbent re-elected.	▌ ✓ Stephen Bolles (Republican) 55.8%; ▌Stanley W. Slagg (Progressive) 22.8%; ▌Jacob M. Weisman (Democratic) 21.4%
Wisconsin 2	Charles Hawks Jr.	Republican	1938	Incumbent lost re-election. Progressive gain.	▌ ✓ Harry Sauthoff (Progressive) 44.2%; ▌Charles Hawks Jr. (Republican) 42.5%; ▌Thomas R. Brooks (Democratic) 13.3%
Wisconsin 3	Harry W. Griswold	Republican	1938	Incumbent died July 4, 1939. Republican hold.	▌ ✓ William H. Stevenson (Republican) 46.0%; ▌Gardner R. Withrow (Progressive) 44.0%; ▌George T. Doherty (Democratic) 10.0%
Wisconsin 4	John C. Schafer	Republican	1938	Incumbent lost re-election. Democratic gain.	▌ ✓ Thad F. Wasielewski (Democratic) 35.6%; ▌Leonard C. Fons (Progressive) 32.8%; ▌John C. Schafer (Republican) 31.5%
Wisconsin 5	Lewis D. Thill	Republican	1938	Incumbent re-elected.	▌ ✓ Lewis D. Thill (Republican) 44.4%; ▌James M. Pasch (Progressive) 32.8%; ▌Francis T. Murphy (Democratic) 22.8%
Wisconsin 6	Frank B. Keefe	Republican	1938	Incumbent re-elected.	▌ ✓ Frank B. Keefe (Republican) 57.4%; ▌Jacob A. Fessler (Democratic) 25.9%; ▌Walter D. Corrigan Sr. (Progressive) 16.7%
Wisconsin 7	Reid F. Murray	Republican	1938	Incumbent re-elected.	▌ ✓ Reid F. Murray (Republican) 51.6%; ▌Gerald J. Boileau (Progressive) 35.7%; ▌Wallace A. Bloedorn (Democratic) 12.7%
Wisconsin 8	Joshua L. Johns	Republican	1938	Incumbent re-elected.	▌ ✓ Joshua L. Johns (Republican) 55.8%; ▌Michael F. Kresky (Progressive) 44.2%
Wisconsin 9	Merlin Hull	Progressive	1934	Incumbent re-elected.	▌ ✓ Merlin Hull (Progressive) 52.8%; ▌John R. Nygaard (Republican) 41.4%; ▌James E. Hughes (Democratic) 5.9%
Wisconsin 10	Bernard J. Gehrmann	Progressive	1934	Incumbent re-elected.	▌ ✓ Bernard J. Gehrmann (Progressive) 48.0%; ▌Peter Van Nostrand (Republican) 35.7%; ▌John G. Green (Democratic) 16.3%

== Wyoming ==
District	Incumbent			This race	
District	Member	Party	First elected	Results	Candidates
Wyoming at-large	Frank O. Horton	Republican	1938	Incumbent lost re-election. Democratic gain.	▌ ✓ John J. McIntyre (Democratic) 53.4%; ▌Frank O. Horton (Republican) 46.5%; ▌Lee R. White (Progressive) 0.1%

== Non-voting delegates ==
After two cycles of electing its delegate in September, Alaska Territory returned to a November election.

District	Incumbent			This race	
District	Delegate	Party	First elected	Results	Candidates
Alaska Territory at-large	Anthony Dimond	Democratic	1932	Incumbent re-elected.	▌ ✓ Anthony Dimond (Democratic) 77.2%; ▌Cash Cole (Republican) 22.8%

== See also ==
- 1940 United States elections
  - 1940 United States Senate elections
  - 1940 United States presidential election
- 76th United States Congress
- 77th United States Congress
