= Charles Kramer (politician) =

American politician

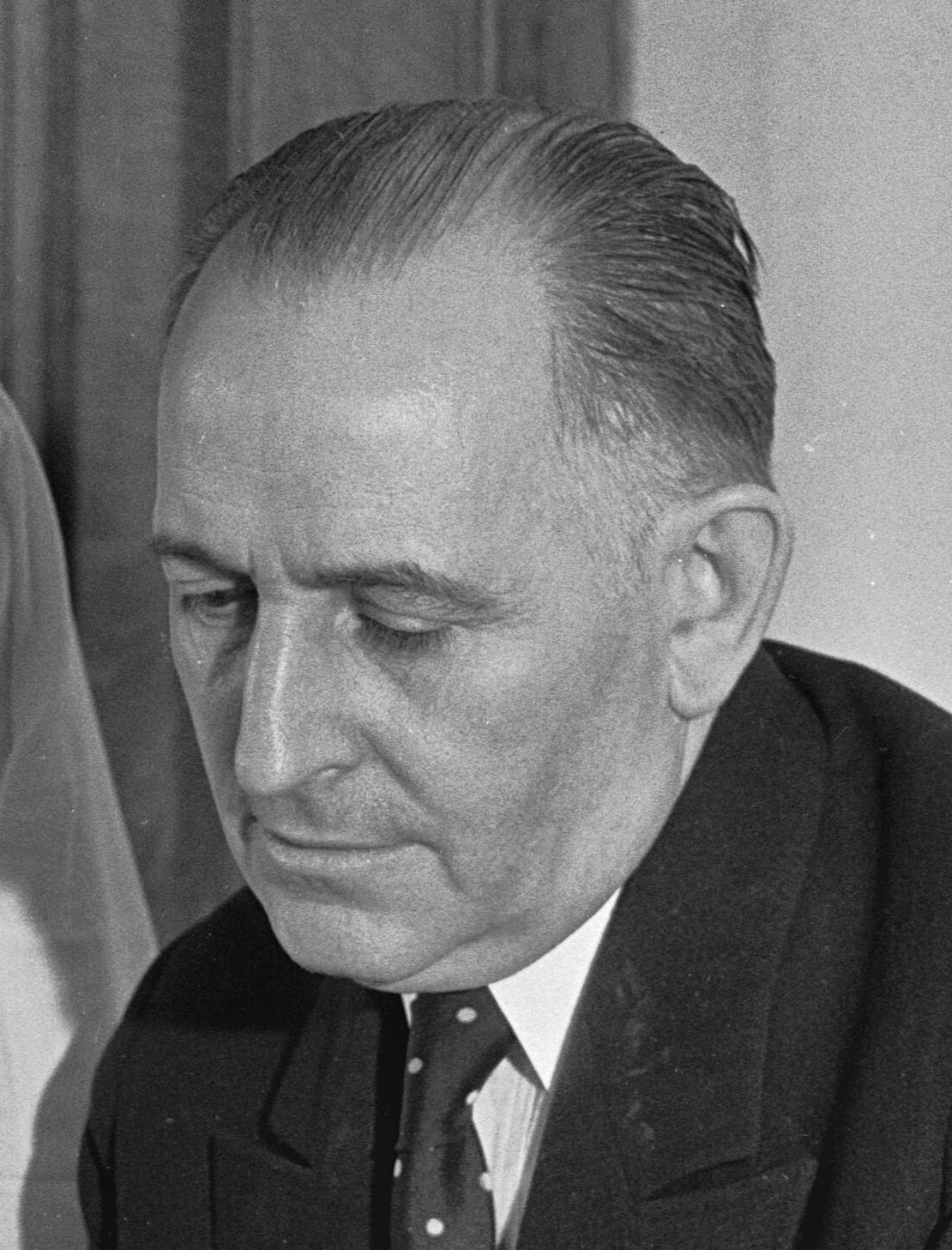
- Kramer in 1934

Member of the U.S. House of Representatives from California's 13th district
- In office March 4, 1933 – January 3, 1943
- Preceded by: District created
- Succeeded by: Norris Poulson

Personal details
- Born: April 18, 1879 Paducah, Kentucky
- Died: January 20, 1943 (aged 63) Los Angeles, California
- Resting place: Calvary Cemetery, Los Angeles
- Party: Democratic

Charles Kramer (April 18, 1879 – January 20, 1943) was an attorney and politician from Los Angeles, California. A member of the Democratic Party, he was most notable for his service as a member of the United States House of Representatives, an office he held for five terms between 1933 and 1943.

== Early life ==
Kramer was born in Paducah, Kentucky, and his family moved to Chicago during his infancy. He attended Chicago's public and parochial schools, and attended and DePaul University and the Illinois College of Law. He was admitted to the bar in 1904 and began practice in Chicago. He was the director of a dress manufacturing concern.

Kramer moved to Los Angeles, in 1920 and engaged in the practice of law. He was also active in civic and fraternal organizations, including the Elks, Moose, and Knights of Columbus.

=== Congress ===
He was elected as a Democrat to the Seventy-third and to the four succeeding Congresses (March 4, 1933 – January 3, 1943). He chaired the House Committee on Patents (Seventy-sixth and Seventy-seventh Congresses). He was an unsuccessful candidate for the Democratic nomination for Mayor of Los Angeles in 1941 and an unsuccessful candidate for reelection in 1942 to the Seventy-eighth Congress.

=== Death ===
Kramer was ill during his final term in Congress. He died in Los Angeles on January 20, 1943, less than three weeks after his final term expired. Kramer was entombed at Calvary Cemetery.

== Family ==
In 1900, Kramer married Martha Dremke of Chicago in St. Joseph, Michigan. They were the parents of a son and two daughters – Elsie (1901–1998) (Mrs. Fred W. Schaarmann), Arthur C. (1906–1979), and Ethel (1919–1969) (Mrs. Frank E. Mauritz).

== Electoral history ==
1932 United States House of Representatives elections in California
Party	Candidate	Votes	%
Democratic	Charles Kramer	65,261	52.7
Republican	Charles H. Randall	53,449	43.1
Liberty	George D. Higgins	5,237	4.2
Total votes		123,947	100.0
Turnout			
Democratic win (new seat)			

1934 United States House of Representatives elections in California
Party	Candidate	Votes	%
Democratic	Charles Kramer (Incumbent)	83,384	62.5
Republican	Thomas K. Case	27,993	21.0
Prohibition	Charles H. Randall	18,760	14.1
Socialist	Michael S. Kerrigan	2,113	1.6
Communist	John J. Graham	1,268	0.9
Total votes		133,518	100.0
Turnout			
Democratic hold			

1936 United States House of Representatives elections in California
Party	Candidate	Votes	%
Democratic	Charles Kramer (Incumbent)	119,251	90.0
No party	Floyd Seaman (write-in)	6,946	5.2
Communist	Emma Cutler	6,362	4.8
Total votes		132,559	100.0
Turnout			
Democratic hold			

1938 United States House of Representatives elections in California
Party	Candidate	Votes	%
Democratic	Charles Kramer (Incumbent)	96,258	65.9
Republican	K. L. Stockton	44,808	30.7
Communist	Louis Baron	5,104	3.4
Total votes		146,170	100.0
Turnout			
Democratic hold			

1940 United States House of Representatives elections in California
Party	Candidate	Votes	%
Democratic	Charles Kramer (Incumbent)	127,167	75.7
Prohibition	Charles H. Randall	36,406	21.7
Communist	Celeste Strack	4,434	2.6
Total votes		168,007	100.0
Turnout			
Democratic hold			

1942 United States House of Representatives elections in California
Party	Candidate	Votes	%
Republican	Norris Poulson	38,577	49.5
Democratic	Charles Kramer (Incumbent)	33,060	42.4
Townsend	Calvert S. Wilson	6,306	8.1
Total votes		77,943	100.0
Turnout			
Republican gain from Democratic			

U.S. House of Representatives
Preceded by None (district created)	Member of the U.S. House of Representatives from California's 13th congressional district March 4, 1933 – January 3, 1943	Succeeded by Norris Poulson
