= 1936 United States House of Representatives elections in California =

Democratic gain Progressive gain Democratic hold Republican hold

The United States House of Representatives elections in California, 1936 was an election for California's delegation to the United States House of Representatives, which occurred as part of the general election of the House of Representatives on November 3, 1936. Democrats gained two Republican-held districts and the Progressive Party gained one Republican-held district.

== Overview ==
United States House of Representatives elections in California, 1936
Party	Votes	Percentage	Seats	+/–
Democratic	1,135,252	50.0%	15	+2
Republican	995,728	43.9%	4	-3
Progressive	89,277	3.9%	1	+1
Communist	29,074	1.3%	0	0
Independent	12,256	0.5%	0	0
Socialist	9,017	0.4%	0	0
Totals	2,270,604	100.0%	20	—

== Delegation composition ==
Pre-election	Seats
Democratic-Held	13
Republican-Held	7

Post-election	Seats
Democratic-Held	15
Republican-Held	4
Progressive-Held	1

== Results ==
Final results from the Clerk of the House of Representatives:

=== District 1 ===
California's 1st congressional district election, 1936
Party	Candidate	Votes	%
Democratic	Clarence F. Lea (incumbent)	58,073	53.8
Republican	Nelson B. Van Matre	48,647	45.1
Communist	Vernon Dennis Healy	1,218	1.1
Total votes		107,938	100.0
Turnout			
Democratic hold			

=== District 2 ===
California's 2nd congressional district election, 1936
Party	Candidate	Votes	%
Republican	Harry Lane Englebright (incumbent)	51,416	100.0
Turnout			
Republican hold			

=== District 3 ===
California's 3rd congressional district election, 1936
Party	Candidate	Votes	%
Democratic	Frank H. Buck (incumbent)	93,110	90.6
Independent	Walter Schaefer (write-in)	5,310	5.2
Communist	Perry Hill	4,390	4.2
Total votes		98,810	100.0
Turnout			
Democratic hold			

=== District 4 ===
California's 4th congressional district election, 1936
Party	Candidate	Votes	%
Progressive	Franck R. Havenner	64,063	58.5
Republican	Florence Prag Kahn (incumbent)	43,805	40.0
Communist	Anita Whitney	1,711	1.5
Total votes		109,579	100.0
Turnout			
Progressive gain from Republican			

=== District 5 ===
California's 5th congressional district election, 1936
Party	Candidate	Votes	%
Republican	Richard J. Welch (incumbent)	82,910	94.8
Communist	Lawrence Ross	4,545	5.2
Total votes		87,455	100.0
Turnout			
Republican hold			

=== District 6 ===
California's 6th congressional district election, 1936
Party	Candidate	Votes	%
Republican	Albert E. Carter (incumbent)	103,712	91.0
Socialist	Clarence E. Rust	8,247	7.2
Communist	Lloyd L. Harris	2,021	1.8
Total votes		113,980	100.0
Turnout			
Republican hold			

=== District 7 ===
California's 7th congressional district election, 1936
Party	Candidate	Votes	%
Democratic	John H. Tolan (incumbent)	69,463	59.8
Republican	Charles W. Fisher	46,647	40.2
Total votes		116,110	100.0
Turnout			
Democratic hold			

=== District 8 ===
California's 8th congressional district election, 1936
Party	Candidate	Votes	%
Democratic	John J. McGrath (incumbent)	78,557	57.6
Republican	Alonzo L. Baker	57,808	43.4
Total votes		136,365	100.0
Turnout			
Democratic hold			

=== District 9 ===
California's 9th congressional district election, 1936
Party	Candidate	Votes	%
Republican	Bertrand W. Gearhart (incumbent)	82,360	97
Communist	Carl B. Patterson	2,571	3
Total votes		84,931	100
Turnout			
Republican hold			

=== District 10 ===
California's 10th congressional district election, 1936
Party	Candidate	Votes	%
Democratic	Henry E. Stubbs (incumbent)	72,476	69.6
Republican	George R. Bliss	31,700	30.4
Total votes		104,176	100.0
Turnout			
Democratic hold			

=== District 11 ===
California's 11th congressional district election, 1936
Party	Candidate	Votes	%
Democratic	John S. McGroarty (incumbent)	69,679	50.5
Republican	John Carl Hinshaw	54,914	39.8
Progressive	Robert S. Funk	12,340	8.9
Communist	William Ingham	1,041	0.8
Total votes		137,974	100.0
Turnout			
Democratic hold			

=== District 12 ===
California's 12th congressional district election, 1936
Party	Candidate	Votes	%
Democratic	Jerry Voorhis	62,034	53.7
Republican	Frederick F. Houser	53,445	46.3
Total votes		115,479	100.0
Turnout			
Democratic hold			

=== District 13 ===
California's 13th congressional district election, 1936
Party	Candidate	Votes	%
Democratic	Charles Kramer (incumbent)	119,251	90.0
Independent	Floyd Seaman (write-in)	6,946	5.2
Communist	Emma Cutler	6,362	4.8
Total votes		132,559	100.0
Turnout			
Democratic hold			

=== District 14 ===
California's 14th congressional district election, 1936
Party	Candidate	Votes	%
Democratic	Thomas F. Ford (incumbent)	63,365	61.0
Republican	William D. Campbell	25,497	24.6
Progressive	Albert L. Johnson	12,874	12.4
Communist	Harold J. Ashe	1,329	1.3
Socialist	Glen Trimble	770	0.7
Total votes		103,855	100.0
Turnout			
Democratic hold			

=== District 15 ===
California's 15th congressional district election, 1936
Party	Candidate	Votes	%
Democratic	John M. Costello (incumbent)	99,107	69
Republican	Ernest Walter Sawyer	44,559	31
Total votes		143,666	100
Turnout			
Democratic hold			

=== District 16 ===
California's 16th congressional district election, 1936
Party	Candidate	Votes	%
Democratic	John F. Dockweiler (incumbent)	90,986	57.7
Republican	Raymond V. Darby	66,583	42.3
Total votes		157,569	100.0
Turnout			
Democratic hold			

=== District 17 ===
California's 17th congressional district election, 1936
Party	Candidate	Votes	%
Democratic	Charles J. Colden (incumbent)	68,189	71.9
Republican	Leonard Roach	24,981	26.3
Communist	John L. Leech	1,634	1.8
Total votes		94,804	100.0
Turnout			
Democratic hold			

=== District 18 ===
California's 18th congressional district election, 1936
Party	Candidate	Votes	%
Democratic	Byron N. Scott (incumbent)	61,415	59
Republican	James F. Collins	72,748	41
Total votes		134,163	100
Turnout			
Democratic hold			

=== District 19 ===
California's 19th congressional district election, 1936
Party	Candidate	Votes	%
Democratic	Harry R. Sheppard	70,339	53.8
Republican	Sam L. Collins (incumbent)	59,071	45.2
Communist	Charles McLauchlan	1,336	1.0
Total votes		130,746	100.0
Turnout			
Democratic gain from Republican			

=== District 20 ===
California's 20th congressional district election, 1936
Party	Candidate	Votes	%
Democratic	Edouard Izac	59,208	56.4
Republican	Ed P. Simple	44,925	42.8
Communist	Esco L. Richardson	916	0.8
Total votes		105,049	100.0
Turnout			
Democratic gain from Republican			

== See also ==
- 75th United States Congress
- Political party strength in California
- Political party strength in U.S. states
- 1936 United States House of Representatives elections
