= 1939 United States House of Representatives elections =

There were several special elections to the United States House of Representatives in 1937 during the 76th United States Congress.

== List of elections ==
District	Incumbent			This race	
District	Member	Party	First elected	Results	Candidates
Maryland 5	Stephen W. Gambrill	Democratic	1924 (special)	Incumbent died December 19, 1938. New member elected February 3, 1939. Democratic hold.	▌ ✓ Lansdale G. Sasscer (Democratic) 83.1%; ▌A. Kingsley Love (Republican) 16.9%
Tennessee 6	Clarence W. Turner	Democratic	1932	Incumbent died March 23, 1939. New member elected May 11, 1939. Democratic hold.	▌ ✓ W. Wirt Courtney (Democratic) 56.4%; ▌Nellie R. Turner (Democratic) 41.2%; ▌John McDonough (Independent) 2.4%
Maryland 1	Thomas A. Goldsborough	Democratic	1920	Incumbent resigned April 5, 1939 to become justice of the U.S. District Court for the District of Columbia. New member elected June 6, 1939. Democratic hold.	▌ ✓ David J. Ward (Democratic) 56.2%; ▌A. Stengle Marine (Republican) 40.8%; ▌George D. Neavitt (Independent) 3.0%
Georgia 4	Emmett M. Owen	Democratic	1932	Incumbent died June 21, 1939. New member elected August 1, 1939. Democratic hold.	▌ ✓ A. Sidney Camp (Democratic) 46.8%; ▌Edgar Blalock (Democratic) 42.1%; ▌Louis C. Clark (Democratic) 10.8%
Arkansas 4	William B. Cravens	Democratic	1932	Incumbent died January 13, 1939. New member elected September 12, 1939. Democratic hold.	▌ ✓ William F. Cravens (Democratic) 32.7%; ▌George R. Steel (Democratic) 16.9%; ▌Osro Cobb (Republican) 13.1%; ▌Roy Gean (Democratic) 12.3%; ▌Dave Partain (Democratic) 12.2%; ▌J. Sam Wood (Democratic) 8.8%; ▌William Jennings (Democratic) 2.6%; ▌Claude A. Rankin (Democratic) 1.3%
Tennessee 3	Sam D. McReynolds	Democratic	1922	Incumbent died July 11, 1939. New member elected September 13, 1939. Democratic hold.	▌ ✓ Estes Kefauver (Democratic) 71.3%; ▌Casto Dodson (Republican) 26.8%; ▌John R. Neal Jr. (Independent) 1.9%
New York 34	Bert Lord	Republican	1934	Incumbent died May 24, 1939. New member elected November 7, 1939. Republican hold.	▌ ✓ Edwin A. Hall (Republican) 66.7%; ▌John V. Johnson (Democratic) 33.3%
Pennsylvania 4	J. Burrwood Daly	Democratic	1934	Incumbent died March 12, 1939. New member elected November 7, 1939. Democratic hold.	▌ ✓ John E. Sheridan (Democratic) 51.8%; ▌Boies Penrose Jr. (Republican) 48.2%
South Carolina 1	Thomas S. McMillan	Democratic	1924	Incumbent died September 29, 1939. New member elected November 7, 1939. Democratic hold.	▌ ✓ Clara G. McMillan (Democratic) 78.7%; ▌I. Shep Hutto (Democratic) 18.3%; ▌James DeFieville (Democratic) 3.0%
Tennessee 2	J. Will Taylor	Republican	1918	Incumbent died November 14, 1939. New member elected December 30, 1939. Republican hold.	▌ ✓ John Jennings (Republican) 60.2%; ▌Hammond Fowler (Democratic) 39.8%
