= Celeste Kaplan =

American activist (1915–1998)

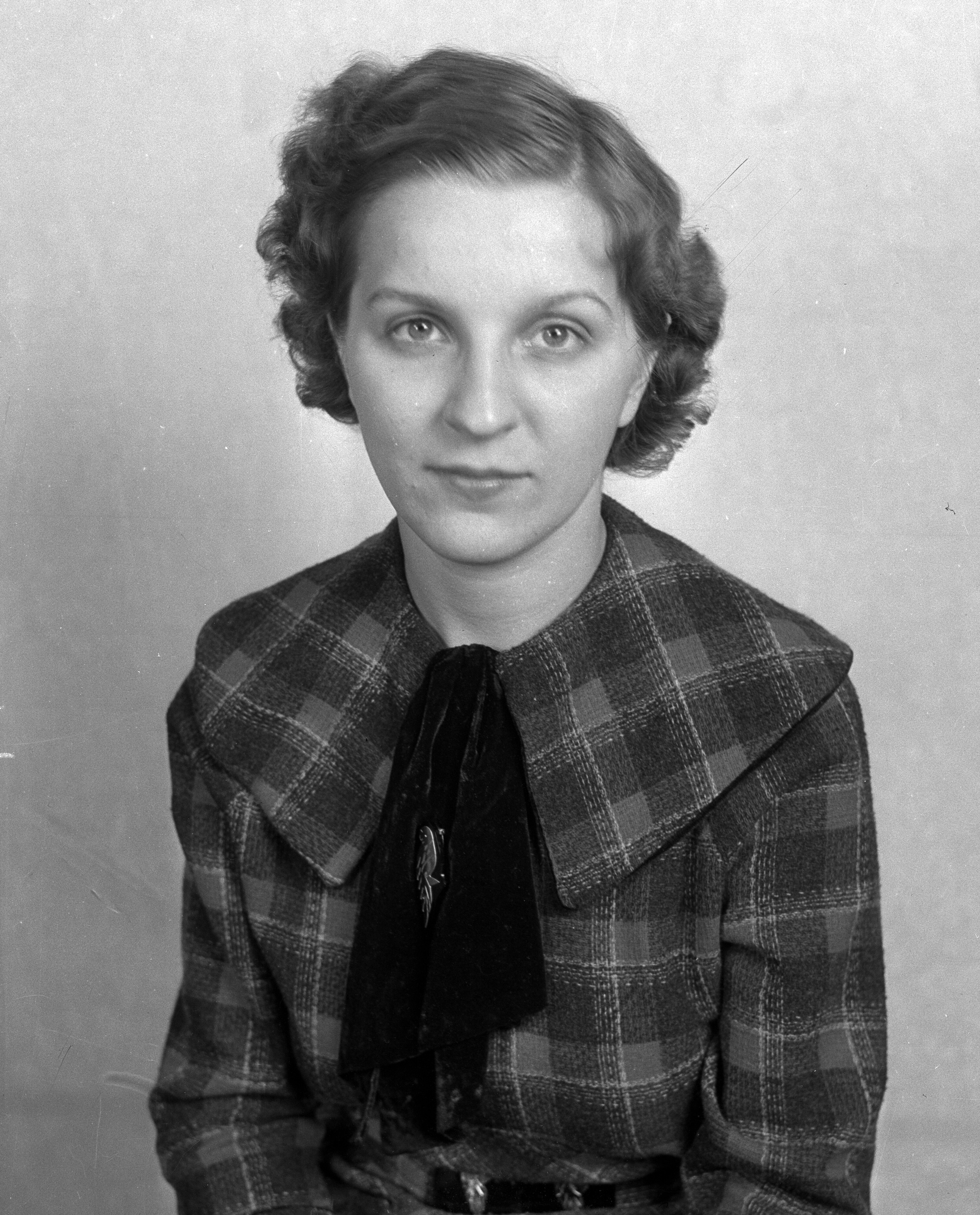
Kaplan c. 1934–35

Celeste Strack Kaplan (née Strack, 1915 - December 1, 1998), was an American social worker, educator, and activist. From 1973 to 1982, she was executive director for El Nido Family Services, and in 1983 helped found and served as the initial president of the Los Angeles Roundtable for Children until 1990. She was also a professor at the University of Southern California School for Social Work from 1983 to 1990, and helped create the Los Angeles County Department of Children and Family Services in 1984. In 2012 she was selected for the Social Work Hall of Distinction.

== Early life and education ==
Kaplan held degrees in economics from UC Berkeley and in social work from UCLA. She was briefly suspended from UCLA in November 1934, for "persistent violation of university regulations including the holding of communistic meetings on its grounds", but was academically reinstated in December 1934, after over 2,000 students participated in a walk-out protest. Strack became a card-carrying Communist Party member by 1935 through the Young Communist League (YCL).

== Personal life ==
Sometime in 1940s Strack met and married fellow Communist Party member Leon Kaplan (most likely through their work with the YCL). As party officials, Strack and her husband went underground in the early 1950s after the arrest of the 12 Communist Party members in 1951. Kaplan was the head of the California underground for the next several years, and Strack was sent to Chicago. Their only child, Dr. Anna Kaplan, was born during this period in New York City in 1954. The Kaplans left the party in 1958.

== Social work and activism ==
During the 1960s, Strack worked at the Council for Jewish Women, and began working with children. She founded the Los Angeles Roundtable for Children, and spearheaded an intensive two-year study by the Los Angeles Roundtable into LA County expenditures on children and families. The Roundtable promoted improved cooperation between the many public and private groups serving children and families in Los Angeles County. The LA County Board of Supervisors helped implement policies based on the Roundtable's ideas.

In 2012 she was posthumously honored for her life of social work.
