= Elton Gallegly =

American politician (born 1944)

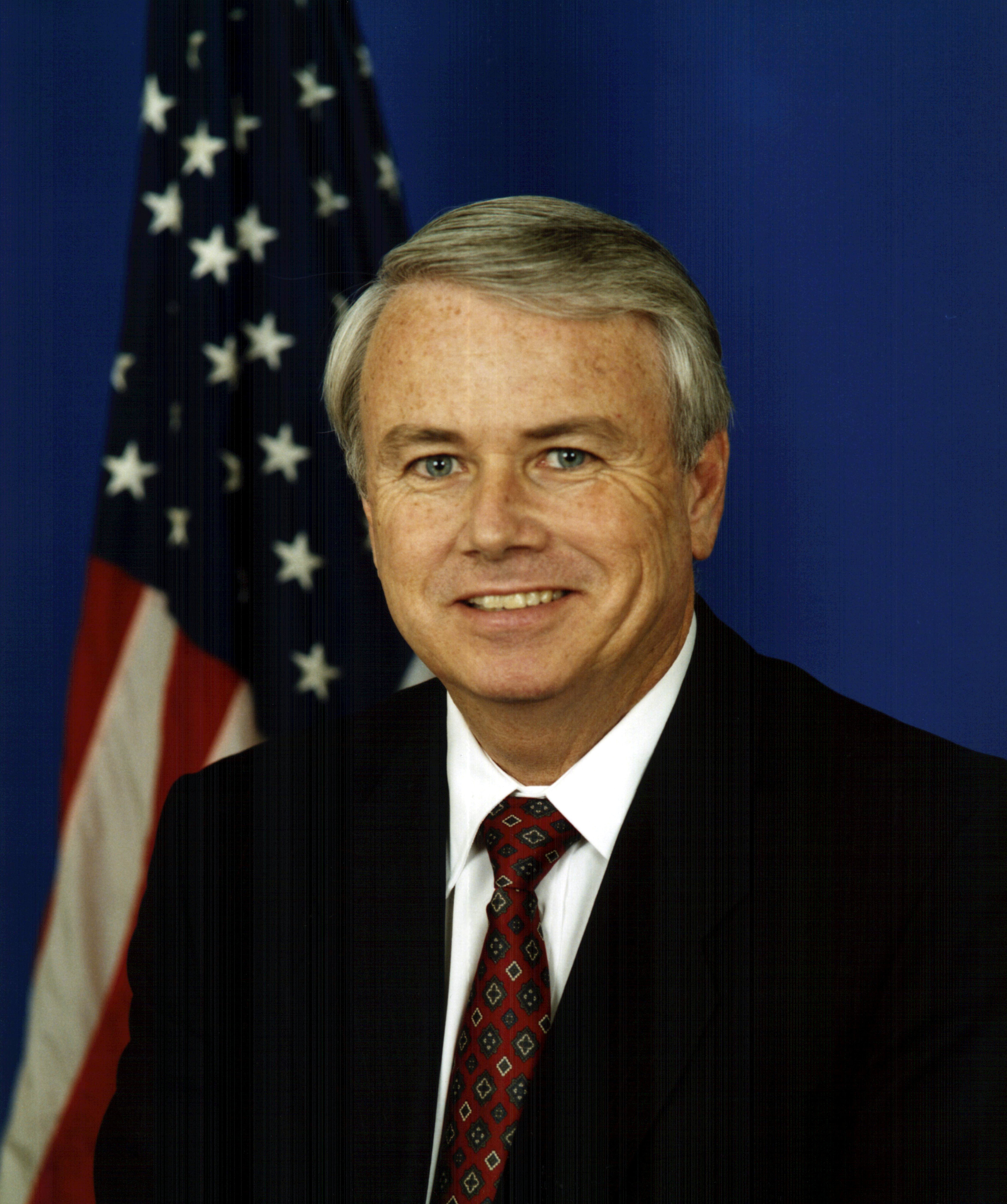

Member of the U.S. House of Representatives from California
- In office January 3, 1987 – January 3, 2013
- Preceded by: Bobbi Fiedler
- Succeeded by: Julia Brownley (redistricted)
- Constituency: 21st district (1987–1993); 23rd district (1993–2003); 24th district (2003–2013)

Mayor of Simi Valley
- In office 1980–1986
- Preceded by: Position established
- Succeeded by: Greg Stratton

Personal details
- Born: Elton William Gallegly; March 7, 1944 (age 82) Huntington Park, California, U.S.
- Party: Republican
- Spouse: Janice Shrader

Elton William Gallegly (born March 7, 1944) is a former U.S. representative from California. A Republican, he last represented California's 24th congressional district. He previously represented the 23rd and 21st Districts, and served from 1987 to 2013. He did not seek re-election in 2012.

Gallegly is the longest-serving congressional representative in Ventura County history.

== Early life, education, and pre-congressional career ==
Born in Huntington Park, California on March 7, 1944, Gallegly attended California State University, Los Angeles but did not graduate. He worked as a real estate broker before entering politics. Gallegly is a former member of the Simi Valley, California City Council. He became Simi Valley's first elected mayor in 1982.

== U.S. House of Representatives ==
=== Elections ===
In 1986, incumbent Republican U.S. Congresswoman Bobbi Fiedler decided to retire to run for the U.S. Senate. Gallegly won the primary with 50% of the vote over Tony Hope, the son of famed entertainer Bob Hope. In the general election, he won with 68% of the vote. He won re-election in 1988 with 69% and in 1990 with 58%. In 1992, he defeated Democrat Anita Perez Ferguson 54%–41%. Since then, he won re-election with at least 58% of the vote, except in 2000. That year, he defeated Democrat Michael Case 54%–41%.

2006

On March 10, 2006, Gallegly announced his intent to retire from the House of Representatives after the 2006 mid-term elections, citing health concerns. He had already filed nomination papers to seek another term, however, and attempted to have his name removed from the Republican primary ballot. California election law, though, makes it clear that a candidate's name can only be withdrawn in the case of their death and, as a result, that Gallegly's name would have to remain on the ballot. The following week, after learning that he could not have his name removed from the ballot and that no new challengers would be allowed to enter the race, Gallegly changed his mind and decided to seek what he said would be his final term. He won re-election with 62% of the vote.

2008

Gallegly won re-election with 58% of the vote.

2010

Gallegly won re-election with 60% of the vote.

The top 5 groups or industries that have contributed cash to Representative Gallegly's 2009/2010 campaign are: (1) Retirees: $39,484 (2) Real Estate: $35,578 (3) Lawyers/Law Firms: $29,374 (4) Pharmaceuticals: $22,500, and (5) Crop Production/Processing $20,179.

=== Tenure ===
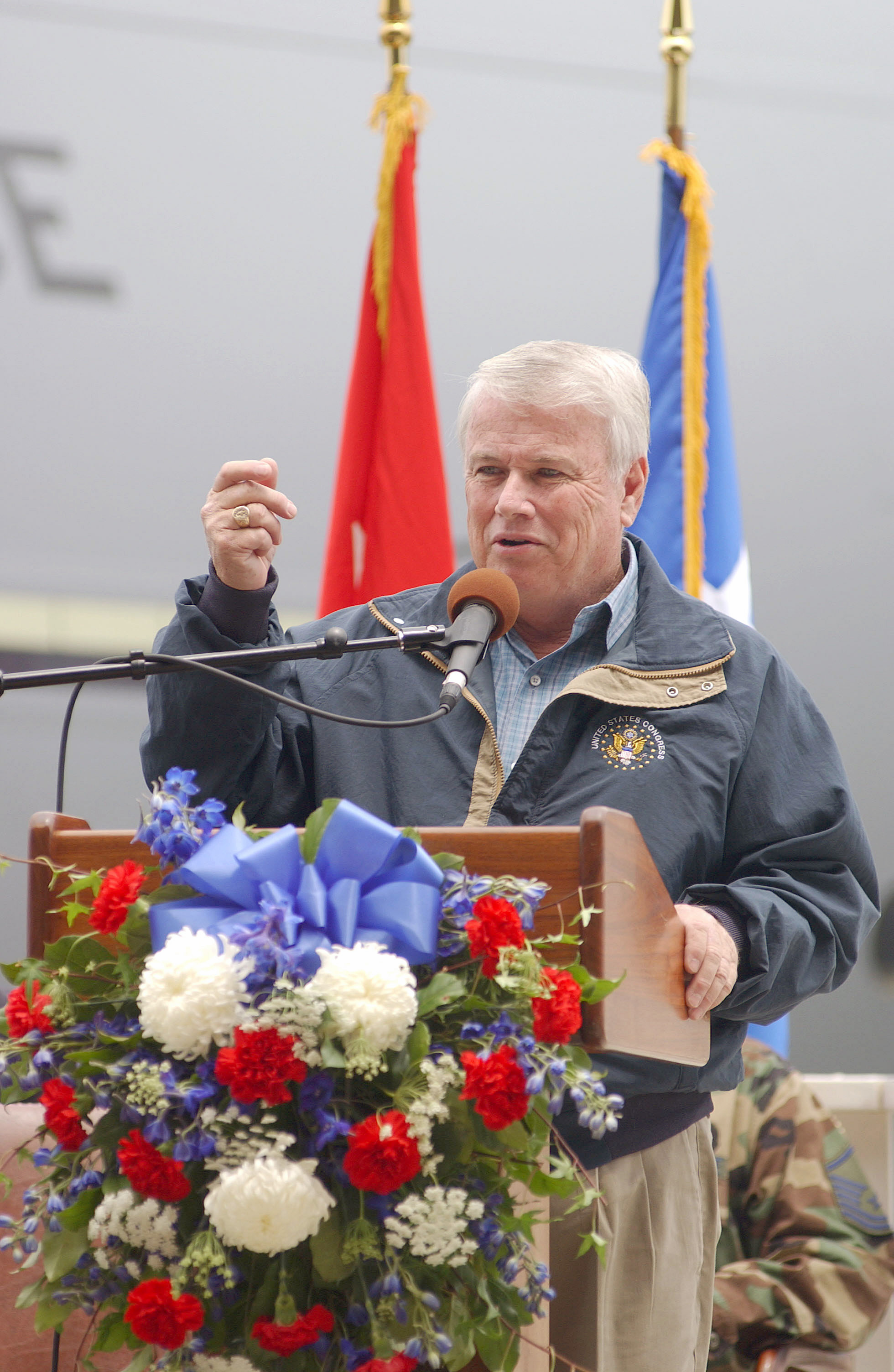
Gallegly in 2002

Gallegly's activism has focused on the issue of animal rights. Gallegly himself wrote a bill, enacted in 1999, which made it a federal crime to sell videos of dogfights and other depictions of animal violence, which enabled people to profit from animal cruelty. On April 20, 2010, the Supreme Court of the United States, in an 8–1 ruling written by Chief Justice John Roberts, overturned Gallegly's law on the ground that the law violated the First Amendment right to freedom of speech and created a "criminal prohibition of alarming breadth."

In his defense, Gallegly argued that the bill he wrote contained "exceptions for religious, political, scientific, educational, journalistic, and artistic expression [that] may have provided too many loopholes within the legislation. Bob Stevens was convicted of committing animal cruelty as defined by the law, but claimed that his rights to free speech and artistic expression protected him against prosecution." Representative Gallegly objected to Stevens’ defense, claiming that the videos "promote violence and, as such, are not protected by the Constitution.".

In 2011, Gallegly voted for the National Defense Authorization Act for Fiscal Year 2012.

Gallegly was a supporter of gifted and talented education, having introduced the Gifted and Talented Students Act of 1998 to provide funding for gifted education.

=== Committee assignments ===
- Committee on Foreign Affairs (Vice Chair)
  - Subcommittee on Europe and Eurasia
  - Subcommittee on the Western Hemisphere
- Committee on the Judiciary
  - Subcommittee on Courts, Commercial and Administrative Law
  - Subcommittee on Immigration Policy and Enforcement (Chairman)

== Personal life ==
Gallegly is married to the former Janice Shrader and has four children. Gallegly is of partial Swiss descent.

A gallery has been named for him at the Ronald Reagan Presidential Library.

=== Dispute over archives ===
The Elton and Janice Gallegly Center for Public Service and Civic Engagement at California Lutheran University is a non-partisan center also named in his honor. Gallegly later sued the university for breach of contract pertaining to the facility. The dispute has carried on over several years, with the central issue a disagreement over the contractual requirements of the archival of Gallegly's papers and mementos, as well as the display of his donated office furnishings. In September 2025, the university and Gallegly announced that a legal settlement had been reached, bringing the lawsuit to a close. Terms of the settlement were not publicly disclosed.

=== Countrywide financial loan ===
In January 2012, it was reported that Gallegly received so-called "VIP" or "Friends of Angelo" loans from troubled mortgage lender Countrywide Financial, in which loans were granted at lower rates than were available to the public. Gallegly and names of other legislators were forwarded to the House Committee on Oversight and Government Reform, which begun an investigation into the issue. Gallegly denied knowing that he was part of Countrywide Financial's special loan program.

== Electoral history ==
Elton Gallegly electoral history

1986 United States House of Representatives elections in California, 21st district
| Party | Candidate | Votes | % |
|---|---|---|---|
| Republican | Elton Gallegly | 132,090 | 68.4 |
| Democratic | Gilbert R. Saldana | 54,497 | 28.2 |
| Libertarian | Daniel Wiener | 6,504 | 3.4 |
| Total votes | | 193,091 | 100.0 |
| Turnout | | | |
| Republican hold | | | |

1988 United States House of Representatives elections in California, 21st district
| Party | Candidate | Votes | % |
|---|---|---|---|
| Republican | Elton Gallegly (Incumbent) | 181,413 | 69.1 |
| Democratic | Donald E. Stevens | 75,739 | 28.8 |
| Libertarian | Robert Jay | 5,519 | 2.1 |
| Total votes | | 262,671 | 100.0 |
| Turnout | | | |
| Republican hold | | | |

1990 United States House of Representatives elections in California, 21st district
| Party | Candidate | Votes | % |
|---|---|---|---|
| Republican | Elton Gallegly (Incumbent) | 118,326 | 58.4 |
| Democratic | Richard D. Freiman | 68,921 | 34.0 |
| Libertarian | Peggy L. Christensen | 15,364 | 7.6 |
| Total votes | | 202,611 | 100.0 |
| Turnout | | | |
| Republican hold | | | |

1992 election
| Party | Candidate | Votes | % |
|---|---|---|---|
| Republican | Elton Gallegly (Redistricted incumbent) | 115,504 | 54.3% |
| Democratic | Anita Perez Ferguson | 88,225 | 41.4% |
| Libertarian | Jay C. Wood | 9,091 | 4.3% |
| No party | Dunbar (write-in) | 61 | 0.0% |
| Total votes | | 212,881 | 100.0% |
| Turnout | | | |
| Republican hold | | | |

1994 election
| Party | Candidate | Votes | % |
|---|---|---|---|
| Republican | Elton Gallegly (Incumbent) | 114,043 | 66.17% |
| Democratic | Kevin Ready | 47,345 | 27.47% |
| Libertarian | Bill Brown | 6,481 | 3.76% |
| Green | Robert T. Marston | 4,457 | 2.59% |
| No party | Nagode (write-in) | 14 | 0.01% |
| Total votes | | 172,340 | 100.0% |
| Turnout | | | |
| Republican hold | | | |

1996 election
| Party | Candidate | Votes | % |
|---|---|---|---|
| Republican | Elton Gallegly (Incumbent) | 118,880 | 59.6% |
| Democratic | Robert Unruhe | 70,035 | 35.2% |
| Libertarian | Gail Lightfoot | 8,346 | 4.1% |
| Natural Law | Stephen Hospodar | 2,246 | 1.1% |
| Total votes | | 199,507 | 100.0% |
| Turnout | | | |
| Republican hold | | | |

1998 election
| Party | Candidate | Votes | % |
|---|---|---|---|
| Republican | Elton Gallegly (Incumbent) | 96,362 | 60.06% |
| Democratic | Daniel "Dan" Gonzalez | 64,068 | 39.94% |
| Total votes | | 160,430 | 100.0% |
| Turnout | | | |
| Republican hold | | | |

2000 election
| Party | Candidate | Votes | % |
|---|---|---|---|
| Republican | Elton Gallegly (Incumbent) | 119,479 | 54.1% |
| Democratic | Michael Case | 89,918 | 40.7% |
| Reform | Cary Savitch | 6,473 | 3.0% |
| Libertarian | Roger Peebles | 3,708 | 1.6% |
| Natural Law | Stephen P. Hospodar | 1,456 | 0.6% |
| Total votes | | 221,034 | 100.0% |
| Turnout | | | |
| Republican hold | | | |

2002 United States House of Representatives elections in California, District 24
| Party | Candidate | Votes | % |
|---|---|---|---|
| Republican | Elton Gallegly (incumbent) | 120,585 | 65.2 |
| Democratic | Fern Rudin | 58,755 | 31.8 |
| Libertarian | Gary Harber | 5,666 | 3.0 |
| Total votes | | 185,006 | 100.0 |
| Turnout | | | |
| Republican hold | | | |

2004 United States House of Representatives elections in California, District 24
| Party | Candidate | Votes | % |
|---|---|---|---|
| Republican | Elton Gallegly (incumbent) | 178,660 | 62.9 |
| Democratic | Brett Wagner | 96,397 | 33.9 |
| Green | Stuart A. Bechman | 9,321 | 3.2 |
| Total votes | | 284,378 | 100.0 |
| Turnout | | | |
| Republican hold | | | |

2006 United States House of Representatives elections in California, District 24
| Party | Candidate | Votes | % |
|---|---|---|---|
| Republican | Elton Gallegly (incumbent) | 129,812 | 62.1 |
| Democratic | Jill M. Martinez | 79,461 | 37.9 |
| No party | Michael Kurt Stettler (write-in) | 16 | 0.0 |
| No party | Henry Nicolle (write-in) | 3 | 0.0 |
| Total votes | | 209,292 | 100.0 |
| Turnout | | | |
| Republican hold | | | |

2008 United States House of Representatives elections in California, District 24
| Party | Candidate | Votes | % |
|---|---|---|---|
| Republican | Elton Gallegly (incumbent) | 174,492 | 58.20 |
| Democratic | Marta Ann Jorgensen | 125,560 | 41.80 |
| Turnout | | | |
| Republican hold | | | |

2010 United States House of Representatives elections in California, District 24
| Party | Candidate | Votes | % |
|---|---|---|---|
| Republican | Elton Gallegly (incumbent) | 144,055 | 59.94 |
| Democratic | Timothy J. Allison | 96,279 | 40.06 |
| Turnout | | | |
| Republican hold | | | |

== See also ==
- Gallegly amendment

U.S. House of Representatives
| Preceded by Bobbi Fiedler | Member of the U.S. House of Representatives from California's 21st congressional district 1987–1993 | Succeeded by Bill Thomas |
| Preceded by Anthony C. Beilenson | Member of the U.S. House of Representatives from California's 23rd congressional district 2003–2013 | Succeeded by Lois Capps |
| Preceded by Brad Sherman | Member of the U.S. House of Representatives from California's 24th congressional district 2003–2013 | Succeeded by Lois Capps |
U.S. order of precedence (ceremonial)
| Preceded by Ron Kind as Former U.S. Representative | Order of precedence of the United States as Former U.S. Representative | Succeeded by Wally Herger as Former U.S. Representative |
