= John Krebs (disambiguation) =

John Krebs, Baron Krebs (born 1945) is an English zoologist. John Krebs could also refer to:

- John Hans Krebs (1926-2014), Israeli-American politician and attorney
- John Krebs (racing driver) (1950-2023), American professional stock car racer
