= 1990 United States House of Representatives elections in California =

- November 6, 1990

All 45 California seats to the United States House of Representatives
	Majority party	Minority party
Party	Democratic	Republican
Last election	27	18
Seats won	26	19
Seat change	▼1	▲1
Popular vote	3,567,775	3,346,962
Percentage	48.96%	45.93%
- Results: Democratic hold Democratic gain Republican hold Republican gain

The 1990 United States House of Representatives elections in California was an election for California's delegation to the United States House of Representatives, which occurred as part of the general election of the House of Representatives on November 6, 1990. Democrats won one Republican-held seat while Republicans won two Democratic-held seats.

== Overview ==
United States House of Representatives elections in California, 1990
Party	Votes	%	Before	After	+/–
Democratic	3,567,775	48.96%	27	26	-1
Republican	3,346,962	45.93%	18	19	+1
Libertarian	235,984	3.24%	0	0	0
Peace and Freedom	127,924	1.76%	0	0	0
American Independent	6,474	0.09%	0	0	0
Write-ins	1,977	0.02%	0	0	0
Totals	7,287,096	100.00%	45	45	—

== Results ==
Final results from the Secretary of State of California:

=== District 1 ===
1990 California's 1st congressional district election
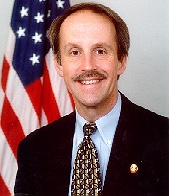

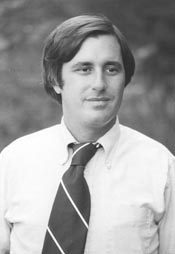
Candidate	Frank Riggs	Douglas H. Bosco
Party	Republican	Democratic
Popular vote	99,782	96,468
Percentage	43.3%	41.9%
- County results Riggs: 40–50% 50–60% Bosco: 40–50%
U.S. Representative before election
Douglas H. Bosco
Democratic
Elected U.S. Representative
Frank Riggs
Republican

Incumbent Representative Douglas H. Bosco ran for re-election. He faced Republican candidate Frank Riggs and Peace and Freedom candidate Darlene G. Comingore. Bosco lost re-election to Rigg by 1.4%, taking 41.9% of the vote to Riggs' 43.3% and Comingore's 14.8%.

California's 1st congressional district election, 1990
Party	Candidate	Votes	%
Republican	Frank Riggs	99,782	43.33
Democratic	Douglas H. Bosco (incumbent)	96,468	41.90
Peace and Freedom	Darlene G. Comingore	34,011	14.77
Total votes		230,261	100.00
Turnout			
Republican gain from Democratic			

=== District 2 ===
California's 2nd congressional district election, 1990
Party	Candidate	Votes	%
Republican	Wally Herger (incumbent)	133,315	63.66
Democratic	Erwin E. "Bill" Rush	65,333	31.20
Libertarian	Ross Crain	10,753	5.14
Total votes		209,401	100.00
Turnout			
Republican hold			

=== District 3 ===
California's 3rd congressional district election, 1990
Party	Candidate	Votes	%
Democratic	Robert Matsui (incumbent)	132,143	60.32
Republican	Lowell Patrick Landowski	76,148	34.76
Libertarian	David M. McCann	10,797	4.93
Total votes		219,088	100.00
Turnout			
Democratic hold			

=== District 4 ===
California's 4th congressional district election, 1990
Party	Candidate	Votes	%
Democratic	Vic Fazio (incumbent)	115,090	54.69
Republican	Mark R. Baughman	82,738	39.31
Libertarian	Bryce Bigwood	12,626	6.00
Total votes		210,454	100.00
Turnout			
Democratic hold			

=== District 5 ===
California's 5th congressional district election, 1990
Party	Candidate	Votes	%
Democratic	Nancy Pelosi (incumbent)	120,633	77.18
Republican	Alan Nichols	35,671	22.82
Total votes		156,304	100.00
Turnout			
Democratic hold			

=== District 6 ===
California's 6th congressional district election, 1990
Party	Candidate	Votes	%
Democratic	Barbara Boxer (incumbent)	137,306	68.07
Republican	Bill Boerum	64,402	31.93
Total votes		201,708	100.00
Turnout			
Democratic hold			

=== District 7 ===
California's 7th congressional district election, 1990
Party	Candidate	Votes	%
Democratic	George Miller (incumbent)	121,080	60.51
Republican	Roger A. Payton	79,031	39.49
Total votes		200,111	100.00
Turnout			
Democratic hold			

=== District 8 ===
California's 8th congressional district election, 1990
Party	Candidate	Votes	%
Democratic	Ronald Dellums (incumbent)	119,645	61.30
Republican	Barbara Galewski	75,544	38.70
Total votes		195,189	100.00
Turnout			
Democratic hold			

=== District 9 ===
California's 9th congressional district election, 1990
Party	Candidate	Votes	%
Democratic	Pete Stark (incumbent)	94,739	58.43
Republican	Victor Romero	67,412	41.57
Total votes		162,151	100.00
Turnout			
Democratic hold			

=== District 10 ===
California's 10th congressional district election, 1990
Party	Candidate	Votes	%
Democratic	Don Edwards (incumbent)	81,875	62.67
Republican	Mark Patrosso	48,747	37.31
No party	Peter James (write-in)	15	0.01
Total votes		130,637	100.00
Turnout			
Democratic hold			

=== District 11 ===
California's 11th congressional district election, 1990
Party	Candidate	Votes	%
Democratic	Tom Lantos (incumbent)	105,029	65.90
Republican	Bill Quarishi	45,818	28.75
Libertarian	June R. Genis	8,518	5.34
Total votes		159,365	100.00
Turnout			
Democratic hold			

=== District 12 ===
California's 12th congressional district election, 1990
Party	Candidate	Votes	%
Republican	Tom Campbell (incumbent)	125,157	60.85
Democratic	Bob Palmer	69,270	33.68
Libertarian	Chuck Olson	11,271	5.48
Total votes		205,698	100.00
Turnout			
Republican hold			

=== District 13 ===
California's 13th congressional district election, 1990
Party	Candidate	Votes	%
Democratic	Norm Mineta (incumbent)	97,286	58.03
Republican	David E. Smith	59,773	35.65
Libertarian	John H. Webster	10,587	6.32
Total votes		167,646	100.00
Turnout			
Democratic hold			

=== District 14 ===
California's 14th congressional district election, 1990
Party	Candidate	Votes	%
Republican	John Doolittle	128,309	51.52
Democratic	Patricia Malberg	120,742	48.48
Total votes		249,051	100.00
Turnout			
Republican hold			

=== District 15 ===
California's 15th congressional district election, 1990
Party	Candidate	Votes	%
Democratic	Gary Condit (incumbent)	97,147	66.18
Republican	Cliff Burris	49,634	33.82
Total votes		146,781	100.00
Turnout			
Democratic hold			

=== District 16 ===
California's 16th congressional district election, 1990
Party	Candidate	Votes	%
Democratic	Leon Panetta (incumbent)	134,236	74.16
Republican	Jerry M. Reiss	39,885	22.04
Libertarian	Brian H. Tucker	6,881	3.80
Total votes		181,002	100.00
Turnout			
Democratic hold			

=== District 17 ===
California's 17th congressional district election, 1990
Party	Candidate	Votes	%
Democratic	Cal Dooley	82,611	54.54
Republican	Charles (Chip) Pashayan (inc.)	68,848	45.46
Total votes		151,459	100.00
Turnout			
Democratic gain from Republican			

=== District 18 ===
California's 18th congressional district election, 1990
Party	Candidate	Votes	%
Democratic	Richard Lehman (incumbent)	98,804	100.00
Turnout			
Democratic hold			

=== District 19 ===
California's 19th congressional district election, 1990
Party	Candidate	Votes	%
Republican	Bob Lagomarsino (incumbent)	94,599	54.61
Democratic	Anita Perez Ferguson	76,991	44.44
No party	Mindy Lorenz (write-in)	1,655	0.96
Total votes		173,235	100.00
Turnout			
Republican hold			

=== District 20 ===
California's 20th congressional district election, 1990
Party	Candidate	Votes	%
Republican	Bill Thomas (incumbent)	112,962	59.79
Democratic	Michael A. Thomas	65,101	34.46
Libertarian	William Howard Dilbeck	10,555	5.59
No party	Lita Martin Reid (write-in)	307	0.16
Total votes		188,925	100.00
Turnout			
Republican hold			

=== District 21 ===
California's 21st congressional district election, 1990
Party	Candidate	Votes	%
Republican	Elton Gallegly (incumbent)	118,326	58.40
Democratic	Richard D. Freiman	68,921	34.02
Libertarian	Peggy L. Christensen	15,364	7.58
Total votes		202,611	100.00
Turnout			
Republican hold			

=== District 22 ===
California's 22nd congressional district election, 1990
Party	Candidate	Votes	%
Republican	Carlos J. Moorhead (incumbent)	108,634	60.04
Democratic	David Bayer	61,630	34.06
Libertarian	William H. Wilson	6,702	3.70
Peace and Freedom	Jan B. Tucker	3,963	2.19
Total votes		180,929	100.00
Turnout			
Republican hold			

=== District 23 ===
California's 23rd congressional district election, 1990
Party	Candidate	Votes	%
Democratic	Anthony C. Beilenson (incumbent)	103,141	61.73
Republican	Jim Salomon	57,118	34.18
Peace and Freedom	John Honigsfeld	6,834	4.09
Total votes		167,093	100.00
Turnout			
Democratic hold			

=== District 24 ===
California's 24th congressional district election, 1990
Party	Candidate	Votes	%
Democratic	Henry Waxman (incumbent)	71,562	68.89
Republican	John N. Cowles	26,607	25.61
Peace and Freedom	Maggie Phair	5,706	5.49
Total votes		103,875	100.00
Turnout			
Democratic hold			

=== District 25 ===
California's 25th congressional district election, 1990
Party	Candidate	Votes	%
Democratic	Edward R. Roybal (incumbent)	48,120	70.03
Republican	Steven J. Renshaw	17,021	24.77
Libertarian	Robert H. Scott	3,576	5.20
Total votes		68,717	100.00
Turnout			
Democratic hold			

=== District 26 ===
California's 26th congressional district election, 1990
Party	Candidate	Votes	%
Democratic	Howard Berman (incumbent)	78,031	61.06
Republican	Roy Dahlson	44,492	34.82
Libertarian	Bernard Zimring	5,268	4.12
Total votes		127,791	100.00
Turnout			
Democratic hold			

=== District 27 ===
California's 27th congressional district election, 1990
Party	Candidate	Votes	%
Democratic	Mel Levine (incumbent)	90,857	58.21
Republican	David Barrett Cohen	58,140	37.25
Peace and Freedom	Edward E. Ferrer	7,101	4.55
Total votes		156,098	100.00
Turnout			
Democratic hold			

=== District 28 ===
California's 28th congressional district election, 1990
Party	Candidate	Votes	%
Democratic	Julian C. Dixon (incumbent)	69,482	72.68
Republican	George Zaldivar Adams	21,245	22.22
Peace and Freedom	William R. Williams II	2,723	2.85
Libertarian	Robert G. "Bob" Weber Jr.	2,150	2.25
Total votes		95,600	100.00
Turnout			
Democratic hold			

=== District 29 ===
California's 29th congressional district election, 1990
Party	Candidate	Votes	%
Democratic	Maxine Waters	51,350	79.40
Republican	Bill DeWitt	12,054	18.64
Libertarian	Waheed R. Boctor	1,268	1.96
Total votes		64,672	100.00
Turnout			
Democratic hold			

=== District 30 ===
California's 30th congressional district election, 1990
Party	Candidate	Votes	%
Democratic	Matthew G. Martinez (incumbent)	45,456	58.21
Republican	Reuben D. Franco	28,914	37.03
Libertarian	George Curtis Feger	3,713	4.76
Total votes		78,083	100.00
Turnout			
Democratic hold			

=== District 31 ===
California's 31st congressional district election, 1990
Party	Candidate	Votes	%
Democratic	Mervyn M. Dymally (incumbent)	56,394	67.15
Republican	Eunice N. Sato	27,593	32.85
Total votes		83,987	100.00
Turnout			
Democratic hold			

=== District 32 ===
California's 32nd congressional district election, 1990
Party	Candidate	Votes	%
Democratic	Glenn M. Anderson (incumbent)	68,268	61.52
Republican	Sanford W. Kahn	42,692	38.48
Total votes		110,960	100.00
Turnout			
Democratic hold			

=== District 33 ===
California's 33rd congressional district election, 1990
Party	Candidate	Votes	%
Republican	David Dreier (incumbent)	101,336	63.67
Democratic	Georgia Houston Webb	49,981	31.40
Libertarian	Gail Lightfoot	7,840	4.93
Total votes		159,157	100.00
Turnout			
Republican hold			

=== District 34 ===
California's 34th congressional district election, 1990
Party	Candidate	Votes	%
Democratic	Esteban Torres (incumbent)	55,646	60.70
Republican	John Eastman	36,024	39.30
Total votes		91,670	100.00
Turnout			
Democratic hold			

=== District 35 ===
California's 35th congressional district election, 1990
Party	Candidate	Votes	%
Republican	Jerry Lewis (incumbent)	121,602	60.58
Democratic	Barry Borton	66,100	32.93
Libertarian	Jerry Johnson	13,020	6.49
Total votes		200,722	100.00
Turnout			
Republican hold			

=== District 36 ===
California's 36th congressional district election, 1990
Party	Candidate	Votes	%
Democratic	George Brown, Jr. (incumbent)	72,409	52.71
Republican	Bob Hammock	64,961	47.29
Total votes		137,370	100.00
Turnout			
Democratic hold			

=== District 37 ===
California's 37th congressional district election, 1990
Party	Candidate	Votes	%
Republican	Al McCandless (incumbent)	115,469	49.75
Democratic	Ralph Waite	103,961	44.79
American Independent	Gary R. Odom	6,474	2.79
Libertarian	Bonnie Flickinger	6,178	2.66
Total votes		232,082	100.00
Turnout			
Republican hold			

=== District 38 ===
California's 38th congressional district election, 1990
Party	Candidate	Votes	%
Republican	Bob Dornan (incumbent)	60,561	58.09
Democratic	Barbara Jackson	43,693	41.91
Total votes		104,254	100.00
Turnout			
Republican hold			

=== District 39 ===
California's 39th congressional district election, 1990
Party	Candidate	Votes	%
Republican	William E. Dannemeyer (incumbent)	113,849	65.34
Democratic	Francis X. "Frank" Hoffman	53,670	30.80
Peace and Freedom	Maxine Bell Quirk	6,709	3.85
Total votes		174,228	100.00
Turnout			
Republican hold			

=== District 40 ===
California's 40th congressional district election, 1990
Party	Candidate	Votes	%
Republican	Christopher Cox (incumbent)	142,299	67.64
Democratic	Eugene Gratz	68,087	32.36
Total votes		210,376	100.00
Turnout			
Republican hold			

=== District 41 ===
California's 41st congressional district election, 1990
Party	Candidate	Votes	%
Republican	Bill Lowery (incumbent)	105,723	49.23
Democratic	Daniel F. "Dan" Kripke	93,586	43.58
Peace and Freedom	Karen S.R. Works	15,428	7.18
Total votes		214,737	100.00
Turnout			
Republican hold			

=== District 42 ===
California's 42nd congressional district election, 1990
Party	Candidate	Votes	%
Republican	Dana Rohrabacher (incumbent)	109,353	59.34
Democratic	Guy C. Kimbrough	67,189	36.46
Libertarian	Richard Gibb Martin	7,744	4.20
Total votes		184,286	100.00
Turnout			
Republican hold			

=== District 43 ===
California's 43rd congressional district election, 1990
Party	Candidate	Votes	%
Republican	Ron Packard (incumbent)	151,206	68.07
Peace and Freedom	Doug Hansen	40,212	18.10
Libertarian	Richard L. "Rick" Arnold	30,720	13.83
Total votes		222,138	100.00
Turnout			
Republican hold			

=== District 44 ===
California's 44th congressional district election, 1990
Party	Candidate	Votes	%
Republican	Duke Cunningham	50,377	46.34
Democratic	Jim Bates (incumbent)	48,712	44.81
Peace and Freedom	Donna White	5,237	4.82
Libertarian	John Wallner	4,385	4.03
Total votes		108,711	100.00
Turnout			
Republican gain from Democratic			

=== District 45 ===
California's 45th congressional district election, 1990
Party	Candidate	Votes	%
Republican	Duncan Hunter (incumbent)	123,591	72.85
Libertarian	Joe Shea	46,068	27.15
Total votes		169,659	100.00
Turnout			
Republican hold			

== See also ==
- 102nd United States Congress
- Political party strength in California
- Political party strength in U.S. states
- 1990 United States House of Representatives elections
