= Chip Pashayan =

American politician

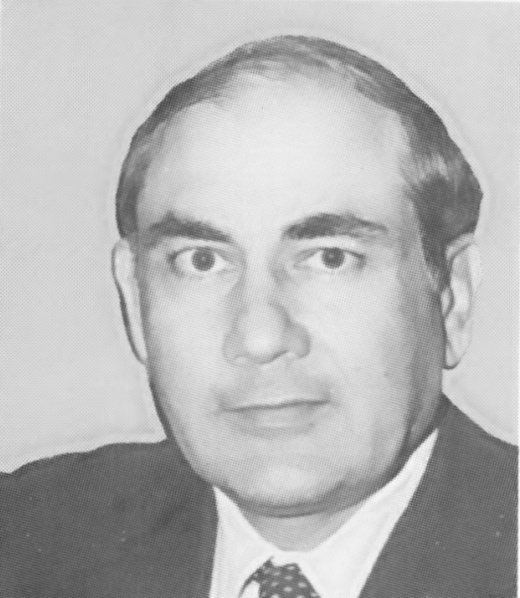

Member of the U.S. House of Representatives from California's 17th district
- In office January 3, 1979 – January 3, 1991
- Preceded by: John Hans Krebs
- Succeeded by: Cal Dooley

Personal details
- Born: Charles Sahag Pashayan Jr. March 27, 1941 (age 85) Fresno, California, U.S.
- Party: Republican
- Education: Pomona College (BS); University of California, Hastings (JD); University of Oxford (BLitt)

Military service
- Branch/service: United States Army
- Years of service: 1968–1970
- Rank: Captain
- Unit: The Pentagon

Charles Sahag "Chip" Pashayan Jr. (born March 27, 1941) is an American lawyer and politician from California. He served as a Republican Congressman from the Fresno area in California's Central Valley from 1979 to 1991.

== Biography ==
Born in Fresno, Pashayan attended Bullard High School, graduated with a B.A. from Pomona College in 1963 and earned his J.D. from the University of California, Hastings College of the Law in 1968.

He is of Armenian descent.

=== Early career ===
He was admitted to the California bar in 1969 and to practice before the Supreme Court of the United States in 1977. He served in the United States Army at the rank of captain from 1968 to 1970. He was special assistant to the general counsel of the U.S. Department of Health, Education, and Welfare.

He earned a B.Litt. from Oxford University in 1977.

== Congress ==
Pashayan won his first term in 1978, when he upset two-term incumbent Democrat John Hans Krebs by a 54% to 46% margin. He introduced a House resolution recognizing Bobby Fischer as the official World Chess Champion, which passed in 1986. He represented his largely rural, conservative district until 1990, when he was defeated for reelection by Democrat Cal Dooley.

== Electoral history ==
1978 United States House of Representatives elections in California
Party	Candidate	Votes	%
Republican	Charles (Chip) Pashayan	81,296	54.5
Democratic	John Hans Krebs (incumbent)	67,885	45.5
Total votes		149,181	100.0
Turnout			
Republican gain from Democratic			

1980 United States House of Representatives elections in California
Party	Candidate	Votes	%
Republican	Charles (Chip) Pashayan (inc.)	129,159	70.6
Democratic	Willard H. "Bill" Johnson	53,780	29.4
Total votes		182,939	100.0
Turnout			
Republican hold			

1982 United States House of Representatives elections in California
Party	Candidate	Votes	%
Republican	Charles (Chip) Pashayan (inc.)	80,271	54
Democratic	Gene Tackett	68,364	46
Total votes		148,635	100
Turnout			
Republican hold			

1984 United States House of Representatives elections in California
Party	Candidate	Votes	%
Republican	Charles (Chip) Pashayan (incumbent)	128,802	72.5
Democratic	Simon Lakritz	48,888	27.5
Total votes		177,690	100.0
Turnout			
Republican hold			

1986 United States House of Representatives elections in California
Party	Candidate	Votes	%
Republican	Charles (Chip) Pashayan (incumbent)	88,787	60.2
Democratic	John Hartnett	58,682	39.8
Total votes		147,469	100.0
Turnout			
Republican hold			

1988 United States House of Representatives elections in California
Party	Candidate	Votes	%
Republican	Charles (Chip) Pashayan (incumbent)	129,568	71.5
Democratic	Vincent J. Lavery	51,730	28.5
Total votes		181,298	100.0
Turnout			
Republican hold			

1990 United States House of Representatives elections in California
Party	Candidate	Votes	%
Democratic	Cal Dooley	82,611	54.5
Republican	Charles (Chip) Pashayan (incumbent)	68,848	45.5
Total votes		151,459	100.0
Turnout			
Democratic gain from Republican			

U.S. House of Representatives
Preceded by John Hans Krebs	Member of the U.S. House of Representatives from California's 17th congressional district 1979–1991	Succeeded by Cal Dooley
U.S. order of precedence (ceremonial)
Preceded by Jim Ross Lightfoot as Former U.S. Representative	Order of precedence of the United States as Former U.S.Representative	Succeeded by Bill Lowery as Former U.S. Representative
