= Jack R. Fenton =

American politician (1916–2007)

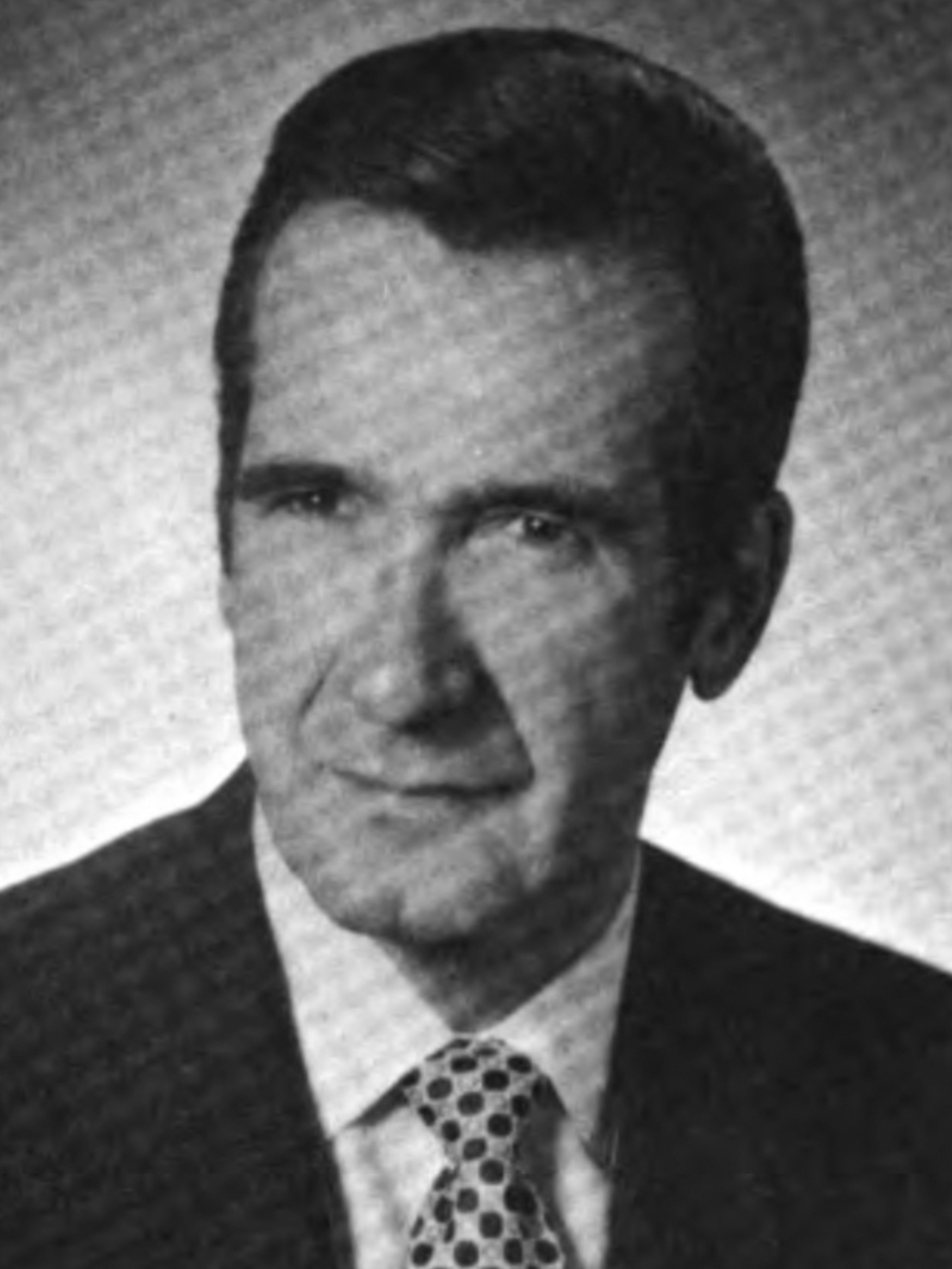

Majority Leader of the California Assembly
- In office January 6, 1972 – November 30, 1974
- Preceded by: Walter J. Karabian
- Succeeded by: Howard Berman

Member of the California State Assembly from the 59th district
- In office December 2, 1974 – November 30, 1980
- Preceded by: Alan Sieroty
- Succeeded by: Matthew G. Martínez

Member of the California State Assembly from the 51st district
- In office January 4, 1965 – November 30, 1974
- Preceded by: John Moreno
- Succeeded by: Robert G. Beverly

Personal details
- Born: August 7, 1916 Rochester, New York
- Died: November 6, 2007 (aged 91) Dallas, Texas
- Party: Democratic
- Spouse: Betty Byer
- Children: 4
- Education: SUNY Brockport
- Profession: Lawyer

Jack R. Fenton (August 7, 1916 – November 6, 2007) was an American politician who represented California's 51st State Assembly district and California's 59th State Assembly district 16 years in the California State Assembly. He was part of the Democratic leadership, majority leader in 1972, and helped establish California's occupational health and safety regime.

== Personal ==
His parents were Lithuanian immigrants. His father operated a delicatessen.

He earned a degree in 1939 from what was then called Brockport State Normal School, and later studied at University of California, Berkeley.

He was drafted into the United States Army in 1941, and served in the Pacific Theater of Operations during World War II. After his discharge, he entered Loyola Law School in 1945, and was graduated in 1949.

Also in 1945, he married Betty Byer who subsequently bore him four children.

He established a law practice in Montebello, California in 1949.

Fenton belonged to many organizations, including the Optimist Club, American Legion and Rotary Club.

He received the George Moscone Memorial Award for Outstanding Public Service in 1978, from an association of consumer lawyers in Los Angeles.

He was appointed a member of the Judicial Council of California in 1979.

== Political career ==
When John Moreno, the first term Mexican American Assemblyman for the 51st District sought reelection, he faced both Dionisio Morales and Jack Fenton. With the chicano vote split, Fenton won the party's nomination in the primary election. He carried the general election with 69% of the vote. He continued to represent Montebello, re-elected to seven more two year terms (from 1974, in the 59th Assembly District.)

In the legislature, Fenton championed consumers, veterans, and labor (including farm workers.)

After Jess Unruh declared his candidacy for governor in 1969, Fenton and George N. Zenovich encouraged Unruh (at first unsuccessfully) to resign as party leader in the Assembly.

Following an industrial accident on June 24, 1971, when a methane gas explosion fatal to seventeen workers occurred in the California Water Project's Sylmar tunnel, Fenton led the investigation in the Assembly's Committee on Industrial Safety. His investigation, and civil litigation, found negligence by the contractor (Lockheed Shipbuilding and Construction Company) and state inspectors. He was a leader promoting statutory change, notably the June 1973 California Occupational Safety and Health Act.

Hospitals and staff threatened to cease organ transplantation activity in 1973 when its legal basis came into question. Criminal defense attorneys argued that harvesting a victim's organs while his heart was still beating caused death, not their clients. Dixon Arnett (R-Redwood City) introduced emergency legislation to recognize death when brain activity ceased. He was three votes short of the required supermajority when he enlisted Jack Fenton, who secured favorable action from two more members. After the California State Senate passed the bill, Arnett flew to Chicago to secure Governor Ronald Reagan's signature giving force to the law.

He served as the assembly's majority leader from 1972 to 1974, and from 1977 to 1980 he was chairman of the Assembly's Judiciary Committee. Earlier, he had been chairman of the Assembly's Finance and Insurance Committee.

Fenton lost his primary election in 1980 to Matthew G. Martínez.

Art Torres was a protégé and Republican Assemblyman Robert Hayden (of Santa Clara's 22nd district) was a friend.

California Assembly
Preceded by John Moreno	California State Assemblyman; 51st District; January 4, 1965 - November 30, 1974	Succeeded by Robert G. Beverly
Preceded by Alan Sieroty	California State Assemblyman; 59th District; December 2, 1974 - November 30, 1980	Succeeded by Matthew G. Martínez
