= Howard Berman =

American politician (born 1941)

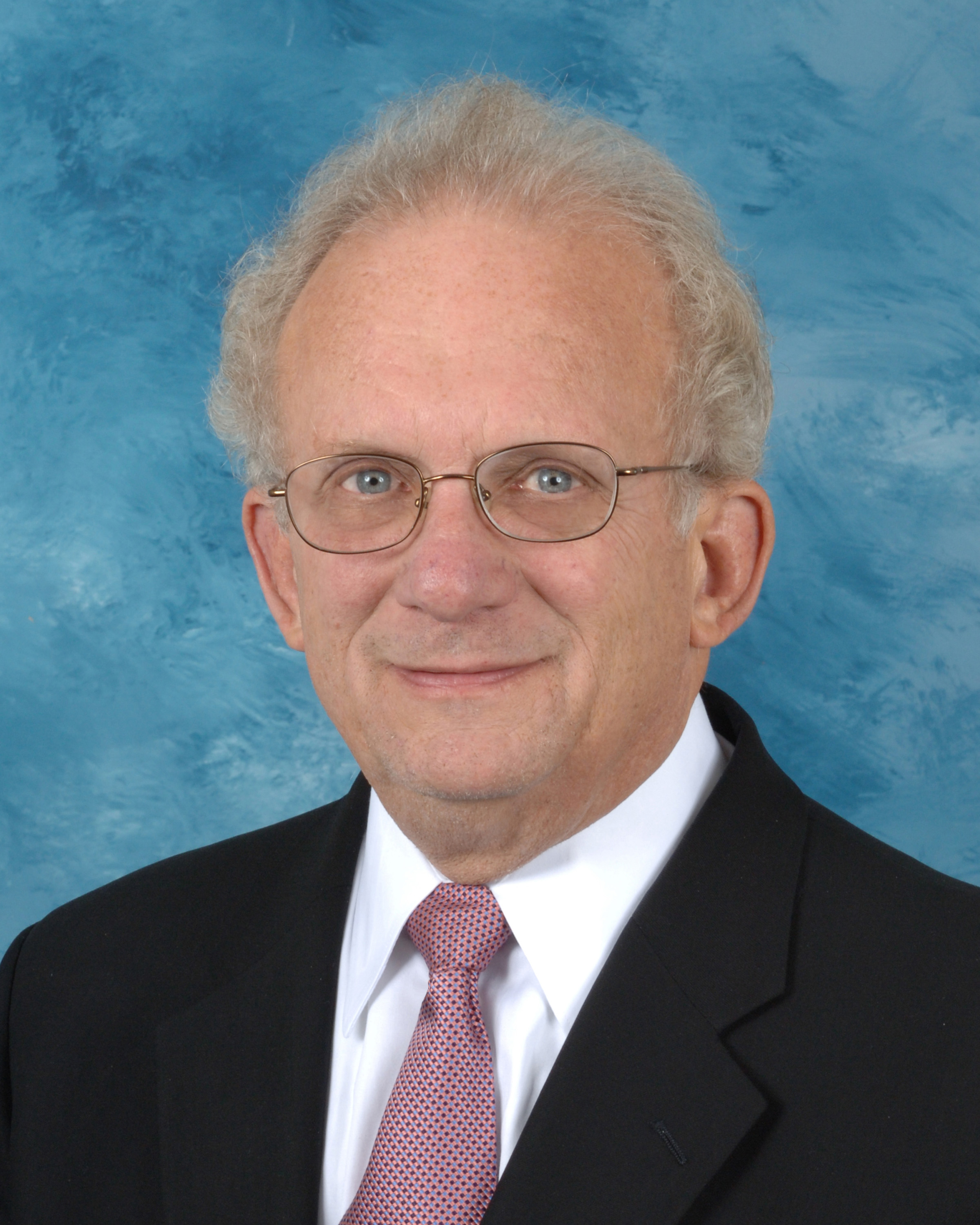
- Official portrait, 2006

Chair of the House Foreign Affairs Committee
- In office February 11, 2008 – January 3, 2011
- Preceded by: Tom Lantos
- Succeeded by: Ileana Ros-Lehtinen

Member of the U.S. House of Representatives from California
- In office January 3, 1983 – January 3, 2013
- Preceded by: John H. Rousselot
- Succeeded by: Brad Sherman (redistricted)
- Constituency: 26th district (1983–2003); 28th district (2003–2013)

Majority Leader of the California State Assembly
- In office December 2, 1974 – December 1, 1980
- Preceded by: Jack R. Fenton
- Succeeded by: Mike Roos

Member of the California State Assembly
- In office January 8, 1973 – November 30, 1982
- Preceded by: Charles J. Conrad
- Succeeded by: Gray Davis
- Constituency: 57th district (1973–1974); 43rd district (1974–1982)

Personal details
- Born: Howard Lawrence Berman; April 15, 1941 (age 85) Los Angeles, California, U.S.
- Party: Democratic
- Spouse: Janis Berman
- Children: 2
- Education: University of California, Los Angeles (BA, LLB)
- Berman's voice Berman supporting a resolution recognizing the 50th anniversary of the 1959 Tibetan uprising. Recorded March 11, 2009

Howard Lawrence Berman (born April 15, 1941) is an American attorney and retired Democratic Party politician who served as a U.S. representative from California from 1983 to 2013. His district, which was modified twice in decennial redistricting, encompassed the Hollywood Hills and parts of the San Fernando Valley.

He was a classmate and longtime political ally of fellow representative Henry Waxman of western Los Angeles, whom he met at the University of California, Los Angeles. In 2012, Berman was defeated for re-election by fellow Democratic incumbent Brad Sherman after their districts were combined in redistricting.

== Early life, education, and legal career ==
Berman was born in Los Angeles, to Jewish parents, the son of Eleanor (née Schapiro) and Joseph Berman. His maternal grandparents immigrated from Russia. He graduated from Alexander Hamilton High School in 1959 and earned his B.A. in international relations in 1962 and his LL.B. in 1965 at the University of California, Los Angeles where he befriended future congressman Henry Waxman. Blanche Bettington, his high school civics teacher, inspired him to enter politics and government.

He was a VISTA volunteer (1966–1967) in Baltimore and San Francisco, and was an associate at a Los Angeles law firm, Levy, Van Bourg & Hackler (1967–72) specializing in labor relations.

== California State Assembly ==
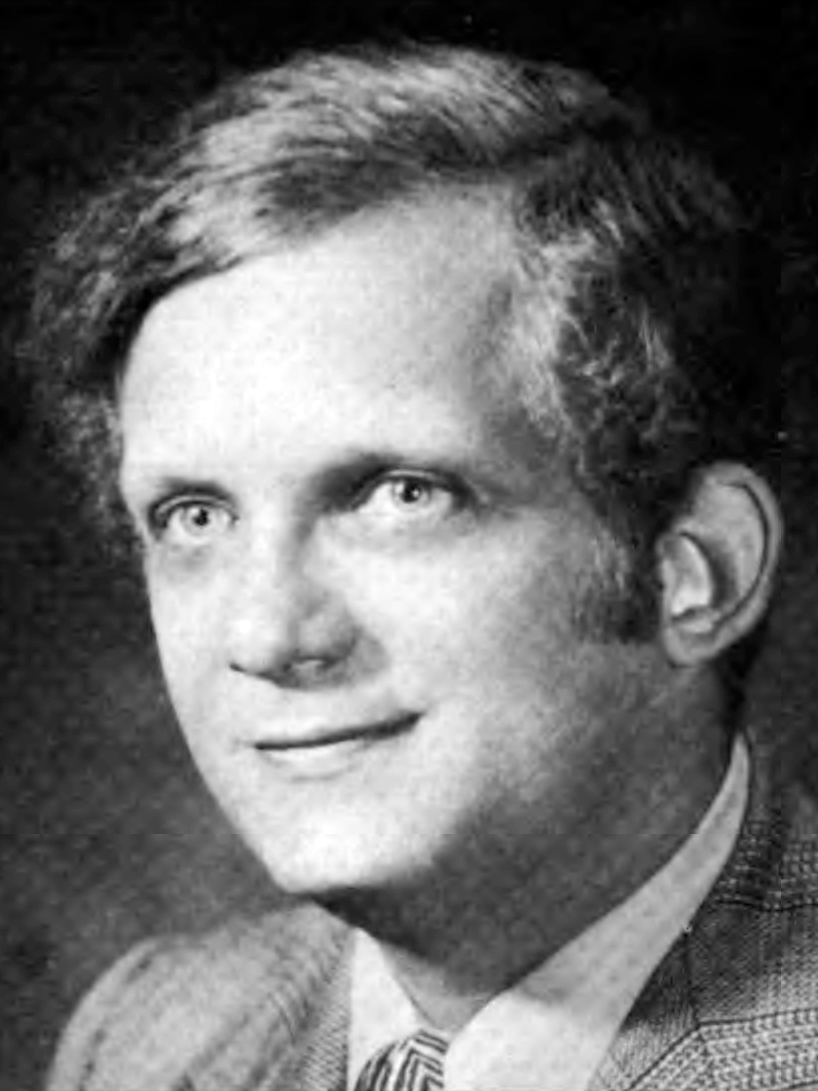
Berman in the California State Assembly in 1975

=== Elections ===
Berman won election to the State Assembly in 1972 from a district in the Hollywood Hills, unseating the incumbent Republican speaker pro tempore. His brother Michael, campaign manager in Henry Waxman's 1968 Assembly race, again ran a targeted mail operation.

=== Tenure ===
In 1974, Berman and Waxman both opposed Willie Brown's unsuccessful revolt against Speaker of the California State Assembly Leo McCarthy, who rewarded Berman's loyalty by appointing him the youngest majority leader in Assembly history. McCarthy fired Berman when Berman tried to replace him in 1980. Although McCarthy failed to retain the speakership, Berman failed to win it and Brown became speaker. Other members remarked on what a tough politician he was; the Bermans helped arrange a primary defeat for at least one colleague (Jack R. Fenton) who had opposed his bid.

=== Committee assignments ===
He also served as Chairman of the Assembly Democratic Caucus and on the Policy Research Management Committee of the Assembly.

== U.S. House of Representatives ==
=== Elections ===
==== 1982 ====
After redistricting made the 26th district significantly more Democratic, incumbent Republican Congressman John Harbin Rousselot decided to run in California's 30th congressional district in 1982. Berman won the Democratic primary for the open seat with 83% of the vote, and the general election with 60% of the vote.

==== 1984 through 2010 ====
Berman was reelected 14 times, never dropping below 61% of the vote, from 1984 through 2010.

The 2000 census allocated California one new House seat, 53 in all. Berman, "dad of the delegation" on redistricting, made a deal with Republicans Tom Davis and David Dreier to keep 34 safe seats for Democrats, add one new Republican district, and protect nineteen incumbent Republicans. Many California Democrats in the House and California State Senate hired Michael Berman, Howard Berman's brother, as a redistricting consultant, for a fee of $20,000 each. When the August 2001 plan was unveiled, Congressman Brad Sherman, a fellow Democrat from California, complained that it undermined the safety of his seat with too many Hispanic voters, saying, "Howard Berman stabbed me in the back." Berman agreed to redraw the boundary between their districts, giving himself 56% and Sherman 37% Latino population. The redistricting plan survived a court challenge from the MALDEF, which argued that the redistricting diluted Hispanic representation. The Republicans suffered some slippage; they had only 19 members in the delegation to the 110th Congress.

From 2001 to 2006, Berman paid his brother Michael Berman's consulting firm Berman & D'Agostino $195,000 from campaign funds. In the 2002 campaign, Berman & D'Agostino was paid $75,000 in political consulting fees. In 2005, $50,000 in consulting fees were paid to the company, and Michael Berman himself was paid a further $80,500 in campaign management and consulting fees. In 2006, $70,000 was paid in consulting fees.

==== 2012 ====
Following redistricting, Berman decided to run in the newly redrawn 30th Congressional District, facing fellow Democrat Brad Sherman. Sherman had the advantage because he previously represented over half of the district. About 60% of voters of the new 30th district resided in Sherman's former district, while just 20% of voters resided in Berman's.

The race, unprecedented in pitting two very similar candidates of the same party against each other in the general election, was called a "slugfest". Berman received the endorsements from about two-thirds of California's Democratic congressional delegation. Among Sherman's endorsements were then-Lieutenant Governor Gavin Newsom of California, then-State Controller John Chiang of California, former President Bill Clinton, and Congressman John Conyers of Michigan.

On June 5, 2012, Sherman ranked first in the seven-candidate open primary, with 42% of the vote. Berman ranked second, with 26% of the vote. The state's top-two primary system, implemented in 2010, allows for two candidates of the same party to face-off in the general election. Berman ran as the more conservative Democrat, hoping to divide the Democratic vote and dominate in the independent and conservative vote. However, in the November general election, Sherman defeated Berman, 60.3%–39.7%.

=== Political positions ===
Berman has been described as "one of the most creative members of the House, and one of the most clear-sighted operators in American politics". He has been an active legislator on several issues, but has also been described as "not one who gets much publicity".

Berman was the House sponsor of the 1986 False Claims Act that authorized civil litigation by whistleblowers. It led to recoveries for the United States Government exceeding $1 billion dollars.

Berman has championed protecting American film industry jobs from outsourcing ("runaway production"). He has also voted against amending the constitution to require a balanced budget, against banning the desecration of the American flag, against the Defense of Marriage Act, and against restrictions on abortion.

However, Berman concurs with many on the right on a number of issues, particularly foreign policy and trade. Berman voted in support of the invasion of Iraq in both 1991 and 2003, as well as for the FISA Amendments Act of 2008, positions that have hurt his standing among many liberals in his district. While he generally supports free trade - for instance, voting in favor of the North American Free Trade Agreement (NAFTA) and various trade agreements with specific countries -, he voted against the more recent Central America Free Trade Agreement (CAFTA). He opposes withdrawing U.S. support for the World Trade Organization. In that same year, he also voted to phase out many farm subsidy programs put into place by the administration of President Franklin Delano Roosevelt as part of the "New Deal".

In Congress, Berman led the investigation into the conduct of House members in the Mark Foley page scandal.

In May 2012, Berman co-sponsored a bill with Republican Congressman David Dreier of California to reinstate tax credits given to films produced mainly in the United States. The credits were active from 2008 until 2011, and were aimed at keeping films in Hollywood. Berman stressed that we "must make every effort to keep American productions here in the United States".

==== Copyright law ====
Berman is known for his protection of copyright interests, and his alliances with the entertainment industry; he was sometimes referred to as the "representative from Hollywood". The major industry contributing to his election campaigns has been the entertainment industry. He proposed legislation under which copyright holders would be able to employ technological tools such as file blocking, redirection, spoofs, and decoys—among others—to curb piracy (Peer to Peer Piracy Prevention Act). He has been named as one of the primary politicians involved in the creation of the Stop Online Piracy Act (SOPA) and the Anti-Counterfeiting Trade Agreement (ACTA). In a September 2008 hearing of the House Intellectual Property Subcommittee, Berman criticized the National Institutes of Health's policy requiring NIH-sponsored research to be submitted to a database open to the public by saying that "the N in NIH shouldn't stand for Napster."

==== Iraq ====
According to LA Weekly, "Berman played a key and under-appreciated role in securing passage of a resolution that gave President George W. Bush broad authority to use force". The National Journal reports that Berman, "played a critical role in winning passage, by a wide margin, of the Iraq War resolution in October 2002. He strongly supported military action against Iraq, and in September, he organized a group of Democrats who shared his views. Berman's discussions led to House Democratic Leader Dick Gephardt's agreement with the administration on the terms of the resolution—talks that undercut the demands of other senior Democrats, including then House Democratic Whip Nancy Pelosi and Senate Foreign Relations Committee Chairman Joe Biden. In June 2006, Berman voted for the Republican resolution to reject a timetable for withdrawal from Iraq."

==== Israel ====
Berman is a supporter of Israel, telling the Jewish newspaper, The Forward, after being appointed Chairman of the United States House Committee on Foreign Affairs, "Even before I was a Democrat, I was a Zionist." He sponsored a bill called the Anti-Boycott Act in the House in 2011 which would have prohibited American individuals and organizations from actively boycotting Israeli goods, if it had passed.

==== Immigration ====
In 2003, Berman expressed his concerns over the Patriot Act with then-United States Attorney General John Ashcroft, specifically on the method to hold illegal immigrants until they prove they are not terrorists.

In 2000, Berman, along with then-Senator Gordon Smith of Oregon, proposed an amnesty, which would have granted legal status to hundreds of thousands of undocumented farm laborers. In exchange, requirements that growers provide housing to guest workers, and pay them a minimum wage adjusted annually for inflation, would have been relaxed. In 2005, Berman was part of the bi-partisan group in Congress that fought for immigration reform efforts. That path to citizenship was also supported by President George W. Bush and Senator John McCain.

==== Investments ====
OpenSecrets named 151 members of Congress who had investments (as of year end 2006) in companies that do business with the United States Department of Defense, suggesting that such holdings conflict with their responsibility for U.S. security policy. The most important such companies, ranked by estimated total value of members' holdings, were Procter & Gamble, General Electric, Pepsi, ExxonMobil, Berkshire Hathaway, IBM, Microsoft, Johnson & Johnson, H. J. Heinz Company, and Wm. Wrigley Jr. Company. OpenSecrets identified the top ten members of Congress, and the report named no other members among the 151, save committee chairmen Senator Joseph Lieberman and Representative Berman. None of the firms listed above ranked among the top ten DOD contractors in 2008, nor in the top twenty for 2009.

==== Ethics ====
Alan Mollohan, ranking member of the House Ethics Committee, resigned from the committee after he himself became the subject of an ethics complaint. Berman had been its senior Democrat from 1997–2003, and on October 5, 2006, Minority Leader Nancy Pelosi re-appointed him to replace Mollohan. Berman served on the subcommittee investigating the House's page program in the wake of the Mark Foley scandal. "This is an honor I could have done without."

The Center for Public Integrity reported in 2006 that members of the House Ethics Committee and their staffs had taken many privately sponsored trips, about 400 trips from 2000 to mid-2005, at a total expense nearly $1 million. Of these, Democrats took about 80% of the trips at about 70% of the cost. Berman and his staff were at the top of the chart, with trips costing more than $245,000. Berman himself had taken 14 trips at the Aspen Institute's expense, including two to China with Mrs. Berman. Aspen replied that its events for members were like graduate seminars, and did not push any policy agenda. "Gene Smith, Berman's chief of staff, said that the bulk of the congressman's foreign travel can be attributed to his being a senior member on the House Committee on International Relations." Five private groups (Campaign Legal Center, Democracy 21, the League of Women Voters, Public Citizen and U.S. PIRG) jointly sent a letter to the ethics committee urging it to ban or restrict such travel.

=== Committee assignments ===
- Committee on Foreign Affairs (Ranking Member)
- Committee on the Judiciary
  - Subcommittee on Intellectual Property, Competition, and the Internet

==== Caucus memberships ====
- Congressional Children's Working Group
- Congressional Diabetes Caucus
- International Conservation Caucus

== Career after Congress ==
Berman joined Washington, D.C. law firm Covington & Burling as a senior advisor in March 2013. Berman also serves on the Board of Directors of the National Democratic Institute. He serves on the board of The Washington Institute for Near East Policy, and is an advisory board member of the Counter Extremism Project.

== Personal life ==
Berman married Janis Gail Schwarz in 1979; they have two daughters, Brinley and Lindsey.

== Memberships and awards ==
- First Annual Farmworker Justice Award, 2000
- President, California Federation of Young Democrats, 1967–1969
- President's award, National Music Publishers Association, 2007
- NATO Parliamentary Assembly
- Mexico Parliamentary Group

== Electoral history ==
Howard Berman electoral history

1982 election
| Party | Candidate | Votes | % |
|---|---|---|---|
| Democratic | Howard Berman | 97,383 | 59.6 |
| Republican | Hal Phillips | 66,072 | 40.4 |
| Total votes | | 163,455 | 100.0 |
| Turnout | | | |
| Democratic gain from Republican | | | |

1984 election
| Party | Candidate | Votes | % |
|---|---|---|---|
| Democratic | Howard Berman (incumbent) | 117,080 | 62.8 |
| Republican | Miriam Ojeda | 69,372 | 37.2 |
| Total votes | | 186,452 | 100.0 |
| Turnout | | | |
| Democratic hold | | | |

1986 election
| Party | Candidate | Votes | % |
|---|---|---|---|
| Democratic | Howard Berman (incumbent) | 98,091 | 65.1 |
| Republican | Robert M. Kerns | 52,662 | 34.9 |
| Total votes | | 150,753 | 100.0 |
| Turnout | | | |
| Democratic hold | | | |

1988 election
| Party | Candidate | Votes | % |
|---|---|---|---|
| Democratic | Howard Berman (incumbent) | 126,930 | 70.3 |
| Republican | Gerald C. "Brodie" Broderson | 53,518 | 29.7 |
| Total votes | | 180,448 | 100.0 |
| Turnout | | | |
| Democratic hold | | | |

1990 election
| Party | Candidate | Votes | % |
|---|---|---|---|
| Democratic | Howard Berman (incumbent) | 78,031 | 61.1 |
| Republican | Roy Dahlson | 44,492 | 34.8 |
| Libertarian | Bernard Zimring | 5,268 | 4.1 |
| Total votes | | 127,791 | 100.0 |
| Turnout | | | |
| Democratic hold | | | |

1992 election
| Party | Candidate | Votes | % |
|---|---|---|---|
| Democratic | Howard Berman (incumbent) | 73,807 | 61.0 |
| Republican | Gary E. Forsch | 36,453 | 30.2 |
| Peace and Freedom | Margery Hinds | 7,180 | 5.9 |
| Libertarian | Bernard Zimring | 3,468 | 2.9 |
| Total votes | | 120,908 | 100.0 |
| Turnout | | | |
| Democratic hold | | | |

1994 election
| Party | Candidate | Votes | % |
|---|---|---|---|
| Democratic | Howard Berman (incumbent) | 55,145 | 62.57 |
| Republican | Gary E. Forsch | 28,423 | 32.25 |
| Libertarian | Erich D. Miller | 4,570 | 5.19 |
| Total votes | | 88,138 | 100.0 |
| Turnout | | | |
| Democratic hold | | | |

=== 1996 ===
1996 election
| Party | Candidate | Votes | % |
|---|---|---|---|
| Democratic | Howard Berman (incumbent) | 67,525 | 65.9 |
| Republican | Bill Glass | 29,332 | 28.7 |
| Libertarian | Scott Fritschler | 3,539 | 3.4 |
| Natural Law | Gary Hearne | 2,119 | 2.0 |
| Total votes | | 195,545 | 100.0 |
| Turnout | | | |
| Democratic hold | | | |

1998 election
| Party | Candidate | Votes | % |
|---|---|---|---|
| Democratic | Howard Berman (incumbent) | 69,000 | 82.47 |
| Libertarian | Juan Carlos Ros | 6,556 | 7.84 |
| Green | Maria Armoudian | 4,858 | 5.81 |
| Natural Law | David L. Cossak | 3,248 | 3.88 |
| Total votes | | 83,662 | 100.0 |
| Turnout | | | |
| Democratic hold | | | |

2000 election
| Party | Candidate | Votes | % |
|---|---|---|---|
| Democratic | Howard Berman (incumbent) | 96,500 | 84.1 |
| Libertarian | Bill Farley | 13,052 | 11.4 |
| Natural Law | David L. Cossak | 5,229 | 4.5 |
| No party | Robert Edwards (write-in) | 5 | 0.0 |
| Total votes | | 114,786 | 100.0 |
| Turnout | | | |
| Democratic hold | | | |

2002 United States House of Representatives elections in California
| Party | Candidate | Votes | % |
|---|---|---|---|
| Democratic | Howard Berman (Incumbent) | 73,771 | 71.4 |
| Republican | David R. Hernandez, Jr. | 23,926 | 23.2 |
| Libertarian | Kelley L. Ross | 5,629 | 5.4 |
| Total votes | | 113,326 | 100.0 |
| Democratic hold | | | |

2004 United States House of Representatives elections in California
| Party | Candidate | Votes | % |
|---|---|---|---|
| Democratic | Howard Berman (Incumbent) | 115,303 | 71.0 |
| Republican | David Hernandez | 37,868 | 23.3 |
| Libertarian | Kelley L. Ross | 9,339 | 5.7 |
| Total votes | | 162,410 | 100.0 |
| Democratic hold | | | |

2006 United States House of Representatives elections in California
| Party | Candidate | Votes | % |
|---|---|---|---|
| Democratic | Howard Berman (Incumbent) | 79,866 | 74.0 |
| Republican | Stanley Kimmel Kesselman | 20,629 | 19.1 |
| Green | Byron De Lear | 3,868 | 3.5 |
| Libertarian | Kelley L. Ross | 3,679 | 3.4 |
| Total votes | | 108,042 | 100.0 |
| Democratic hold | | | |

2008 United States House of Representatives elections in California
| Party | Candidate | Votes | % |
|---|---|---|---|
| Democratic | Howard Berman (Incumbent) | 137,471 | 100.0 |
| Democratic hold | | | |

2010 United States House of Representatives elections in California
| Party | Candidate | Votes | % |
|---|---|---|---|
| Democratic | Howard Berman (Incumbent) | 88,385 | 69.6 |
| Republican | Merlin Froyd | 28,493 | 22.4 |
| Libertarian | Carlos A. Rodriguez | 10,229 | 8.0 |
| Total votes | | 127,107 | 100.0 |
| Democratic hold | | | |

2012 Nonpartisan blanket primary results
| Party | Candidate | Votes | % |
|---|---|---|---|
| Democratic | Brad Sherman (incumbent) | 40,589 | 42.4 |
| Democratic | Howard Berman (incumbent) | 31,086 | 32.5 |
| Republican | Mark Reed | 11,991 | 12.5 |
| Republican | Navraj Singh | 5,521 | 5.8 |
| Republican | Susan Shelley | 3,878 | 4.0 |
| Green | Michael W. Powelson | 1,976 | 2.1 |
| Democratic | Vince Gilmore | 792 | 0.8 |
| Total votes | | 95,833 | 100.0 |

== See also ==
- List of Jewish members of the United States Congress

California Assembly
| Preceded by Jack R. Fenton | Majority Leader of the California Assembly; 1974–1980 | Succeeded by Willie Brown |
U.S. House of Representatives
| Preceded by John H. Rousselot | Member of the U.S. House of Representatives from California's 26th congressional district 1983–2003 | Succeeded by David Dreier |
| Preceded by Jim McDermott | Ranking Member of the House Ethics Committee; 1997–2003 | Succeeded by Alan Mollohan |
| Preceded by David Dreier | Member of the U.S. House of Representatives from California's 28th congressional district 2003–2013 | Succeeded by Adam Schiff |
| Preceded by Alan Mollohan | Ranking Member of the House Ethics Committee; 2006–2007 | Succeeded by Doc Hastings |
| Preceded by Tom Lantos | Chair of the House Foreign Affairs Committee; 2008–2011 | Succeeded by Ileana Ros-Lehtinen |
| Preceded by Ileana Ros-Lehtinen | Ranking Member of the House Foreign Affairs Committee; 2011–2013 | Succeeded by Eliot Engel |
U.S. order of precedence (ceremonial)
| Preceded by Ileana Ros-Lehtinen as Former U.S. Representative | Order of precedence of the United States as Former U.S. Representative | Succeeded by Dana Rohrabacher as Former U.S. Representative |
