= Cal Dooley =

American politician (born 1954)

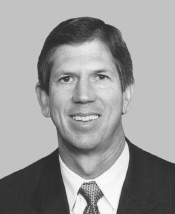

Chair of the New Democrat Coalition
- In office January 3, 1997 – January 3, 2001 Serving with Jim Moran, Tim Roemer
- Preceded by: Position established
- Succeeded by: Jim Davis; Ron Kind; Adam Smith

Member of the U.S. House of Representatives from California
- In office January 3, 1991 – January 3, 2005
- Preceded by: Chip Pashayan
- Succeeded by: Jim Costa
- Constituency: 17th district (1991–1993); 20th district (1993–2005)

Personal details
- Born: January 11, 1954 (age 72) Visalia, California, U.S.
- Party: Democratic
- Spouse: Linda Phillips
- Education: University of California, Davis (BS); Stanford University (MA)

Calvin M. Dooley (born January 11, 1954) is an American politician, who served as a member of the United States House of Representatives from 1991 to 2005. A member of the Democratic Party, he represented the 17th and 20th districts of California.

== Early life and education ==
Born in Visalia, California, he grew up on his parents' farm several miles east of Hanford and graduated from Hanford Union High School in 1972. Dooley earned his bachelor's degree in agricultural economics from the University of California, Davis in 1977 and a master's degree in management from Stanford University in 1987.

== Career ==
Dooley worked as a rancher and then as an administrative assistant for California State Senator Rose Ann Vuich from 1987 to 1990.

=== U.S. House of Representatives ===
In 1990, Dooley won the Democratic primary for what was then the 17th District and faced six-term Republican Chip Pashayan in November. Although Pashayan had been reelected with 71 percent of the vote in 1988, he was bogged down by the House banking scandal, and Dooley defeated him by just over 9 points. In 1992, his district was renumbered as the 20th District and drawn as a Latino-majority district. He was easily reelected that year and five more times after that. He faced only one truly serious contest, when Republican Rich Rodriguez managed to hold him to 53 percent of the vote. A "New Democrat," his voting record was considered moderate, as is typical for Democrats from the Central Valley.

Dooley announced his retirement in 2004 and endorsed his chief of staff, Lisa Quigley, as his successor. However, most of the rest of the state Democratic establishment endorsed Jim Costa, a former state legislator from the Fresno area. This touched off a contentious primary battle which was won by Costa, all but assuring him of victory in November. On October 10, 2002, Cal Dooley was among the 81 House Democrats who voted in favor of authorizing the invasion of Iraq. He has later said that he regrets this vote.

=== Trade association CEO ===
Having served as the president and CEO of the Food Products Association (FPA), Dooley assumed the same roles at the Grocery Manufacturers Association (GMA), following a merger with the FPA. GMA is a Washington-based trade association representing food manufacturers.

In September 2008, Dooley assumed the position of CEO of the American Chemistry Council, the trade association for American chemical companies. He announced his retirement in 2019.

== Personal life ==
Dooley is married to the former Linda Phillips, who heads the Bryce Harlow Foundation in Washington DC. The couple have two daughters, one of whom is on the Charlottesville City School Board.

== Electoral history ==
1990 United States House of Representatives elections in California
Party	Candidate	Votes	%
Democratic	Cal Dooley	82,611	54.5
Republican	Charles (Chip) Pashayan (incumbent)	68,848	45.5
Total votes		151,459	100.0
Turnout			
Democratic gain from Republican			

1992 United States House of Representatives elections in California, 20th district
Party	Candidate	Votes	%
Democratic	Cal Dooley	72,679	64.9
Republican	Ed Hunt	39,388	35.1
Total votes		112,067	100.0
Democratic gain from Republican			

1994 United States House of Representatives elections in California, 20th district
Party	Candidate	Votes	%
Democratic	Cal Dooley (Incumbent)	57,394	56.70
Republican	Paul Young	43,836	43.30
Total votes		101,230	100.0
Democratic hold			

1996 United States House of Representatives elections in California, 20th district
Party	Candidate	Votes	%
Democratic	Cal Dooley (Incumbent)	65,381	56.6
Republican	Trice Harvey	45,276	39.1
Libertarian	Jonathan Richter	5,048	4.3
Total votes		115,705	100.0
Democratic hold			

1998 United States House of Representatives elections in California, 20th district
Party	Candidate	Votes	%
Democratic	Cal Dooley (Incumbent)	60,599	60.73
Republican	Cliff Unruh	39,183	39.27
Total votes		99,782	100.0
Democratic hold			

2000 United States House of Representatives elections in California, 20th district
Party	Candidate	Votes	%
Democratic	Cal Dooley (Incumbent)	66,235	52.4
Republican	Rich Rodriguez	57,563	45.5
Natural Law	Walter Kenneth Ruehlig	1,416	1.1
Libertarian	Arnold Kriegbaum	1,320	1.0
Total votes		126,534	100.0
Democratic hold			

2002 United States House of Representatives elections in California, 20th district
Party	Candidate	Votes	%
Democratic	Cal Dooley (Incumbent)	47,627	63.7
Republican	Andre Minuth	25,628	34.3
Libertarian	Varrin Swearingen	1,515	2.0
Turnout		74,770	
Democratic hold			

U.S. House of Representatives
Preceded by Chip Pashayan	Member of the U.S. House of Representatives from California's 17th congressional district 1991–1993	Succeeded by Leon Panetta
Preceded by Bill Thomas	Member of the U.S. House of Representatives from California's 20th congressional district 1993–2005	Succeeded by Jim Costa
Party political offices
New office	Chair of the New Democrat Coalition; 1997–2001; Served alongside: Jim Moran, Tim Roemer	Succeeded by Jim Davis; Ron Kind; Adam Smith
U.S. order of precedence (ceremonial)
Preceded by Gary Condit as Former U.S. Representative	Order of precedence of the United States as Former U.S. Representative	Succeeded by Richard Pombo as Former U.S. Representative
