= List of mayors of Simi Valley, California =

Mayor of Simi Valley
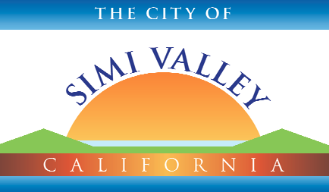
- Flag of Simi Valley
- Incumbent; Dee Dee Cavanaugh since January 28, 2025
- Term length: 4 years
- Formation: 1969
- First holder: Lester Cleveland

Simi Valley is a city in the valley of the same name, is in the southeast corner of Ventura County, California. It was incorporated on October 10, 1969. Simi Valley's government uses the "Council-Manager" form of government. This means that the city council is composed of one mayor, elected every two years.

== Mayors ==
List of Mayors Serving in Simi Valley, CA
#	Name	Term start	Term end	Notes
1	Lester Cleveland	1969	1972	First mayor of the city.
2	Ted Grandsen	1972	1974	
3	Jim Smith	1974	1976	
4	William Carpenter	1976	1978	
5	Ginger Gherardi	1978	1979	First female mayor of the city.
6	Cathie Wright	1979	1980	
7	Elton Gallegly	1980	1986	
8	Gregory Stratton	1986	1998	Longest serving mayor.
9	Bill Davis	1998	2004	
10	Paul Miller	2004	2010	
11	Bob Huber	2010	2018	
12	Keith Mashburn	2018	2022	
13	Fred D. Thomas	2022	2025	Won reelection in November 2024, then died in office on January 22, 2025.
14	Dee Dee Cavanaugh	2025	2026?	Longstanding council member and former Mayor Pro Tem. Took office after Fred Thomas' death.
