= California's 17th congressional district =

U.S. House district for California

Coordinates: 36.3°N 121.2°W

- Interactive map of district boundaries
- Representative: Ro Khanna; D–Fremont
- Population (2025): 756,409
- Median household income: $187,036
- Ethnicity: 56.3% Asian; 20.9% White; 16.3% Hispanic; 3.6% Two or more races; 1.9% Black; 1.0% other
- Cook PVI: D+21

California's 17th congressional district is a congressional district in the U.S. state of California that is currently represented by Ro Khanna. It is located in the South Bay and East Bay regions of the San Francisco Bay Area.

The district includes parts of Alameda County and Santa Clara County. It encompasses the cities of Sunnyvale, Cupertino, Santa Clara, Milpitas, Newark, parts of Fremont, and the northernmost and westernmost parts of San Jose. The district includes the campus of Santa Clara University and the corporate headquarters of several Silicon Valley companies, such as Apple Inc, Intel Corp., and Yahoo.

From 2003 to 2013, the district covered all of Monterey and San Benito counties, as well as part of Santa Cruz County. It included all of the coastal communities surrounding Monterey Bay, the city of Salinas, and the vast majority of the Salinas Valley. The district was mostly unchanged during the 2021 redistricting, although it now encompasses a smaller portion of Fremont.

== Recent election results from statewide races ==
=== 2023–2027 boundaries ===
Year	Office	Results
2008	President	Obama 71% - 29%
2010	Governor	Brown 62% - 34%
2010	Lt. Governor	Newsom 62% - 29%
2010	Secretary of State	Bowen 63% - 28%
2010	Attorney General	Harris 56% - 35%
2010	Treasurer	Lockyer 66% - 27%
2010	Controller	Chiang 64% - 27%
2012	President	Obama 74% - 26%
2014	Governor	Brown 75% - 25%
2016	President	Clinton 74% - 20%
2018	Governor	Newsom 72% - 28%
2018	Attorney General	Becerra 73% - 27%
2020	President	Biden 73% - 25%
2022	Senate (Reg.)	Padilla 71% - 29%
2022	Governor	Newsom 71% - 29%
2022	Lt. Governor	Kounalakis 71% - 29%
2022	Secretary of State	Weber 70% - 30%
2022	Attorney General	Bonta 69% - 31%
2022	Treasurer	Ma 70% - 30%
2022	Controller	Cohen 63% - 37%
2024	President	Harris 67% - 29%
2024	Senate (Reg.)	Schiff 68% - 32%

== Composition ==
FIPS County Code	County	Seat	Population
1	Alameda	Oakland	1,622,188
85	Santa Clara	San Jose	1,877,592

Under the 2020 redistricting, California's 17th congressional district takes up the Tri-City area of the San Francisco Bay Area, taking up the western borders of Alameda and Santa Clara Counties. The area in Alameda County includes the south side of the city of Fremont, and the city of Newark. The area in Santa Clara County includes the north side of the city of San Jose; part of the census designated place Alum Rock; and the cities of Milpitas, Santa Clara, Sunnyvale, and Cupertino.

Alameda County is split between this district and the 14th district. They are partitioned by Mission Peak Regional Park, Witherly Ln, Mission Blvd, Washington Blvd, Farallon Cmn, Paseo Padre Parkway, Grimmer Blvd, Blacow Rd, Omar St, Butano Park Dr, Farina Ln, Nimitz Freeway, Highway 84.

Santa Clara County is split between this district, the 16th district, and the 18th district. The 17th and 16th are partitioned by Stevens Creek Blvd, Santana Row, Olsen Dr, S Winchester Blvd, Williams Rd, Eden Ave, Lexington Dr, Valley Forge Way, Gleason Ave, Moreland Way, Payne Ave, Saratoga Ave, Doyle Rd, Highway G2, Royal Ann Dr, Wisteria Way, Rainbow Dr, Highway 85, S De Anza Blvd, Prospect Rd, Fremont Older Open Space, Permanente Creek, Highway 280, N Foothill Blvd, Homestead Rd, Stevens Creek, W EL Camino Real, Magritte Way, Highway G6, Highway 101, and Enterprise Way. The 17th and 18th are partitioned by Steven's Creek Blvd, Di Salvo Ave, Bellerose Dr, Forest Ave, Wabash Ave, W San Carlos St, Race St, The Alameda, University Ave, Elm St, Highway 82, Newhall St, Morse St, Idaho St, Alameda Ct, Sherwood Ave, Hamline St, Highway 880, Highway 101, McKee Rd, Toyon Ave, Penitencia Creek Rd, Canon Vista Ave, Crothers Rd, Alum Rock Park, Sierra Rd, Felter Rd, Weller Rd.

=== Cities and CDPs with 10,000 or more people ===
- San Jose – 1,013,240
- Fremont – 230,504
- Sunnyvale – 155,805
- Santa Clara – 127,647
- Milpitas – 80,273
- Cupertino – 60,381
- Newark – 47,529
- Alum Rock – 12,042

== List of members representing the district ==
Representative	Party	Dates	Cong ress(es)	Electoral history	Counties
District created March 4, 1933
Charles J. Colden (Los Angeles)	Democratic	March 4, 1933 – April 15, 1938	73rd 74th 75th	Elected in 1932. Re-elected in 1934. Re-elected in 1936. Died.	Los Angeles
Vacant		April 15, 1938 – January 3, 1939	75th		Los Angeles
Lee E. Geyer (Gardena)	Democratic	January 3, 1939 – October 11, 1941	76th 77th	Elected in 1938. Re-elected in 1940. Died.	Los Angeles
Vacant		October 11, 1941 – August 25, 1942	77th		Los Angeles
Cecil R. King (Los Angeles)	Democratic	August 25, 1942 – January 3, 1969	77th 78th 79th 80th 81st 82nd 83rd 84th 85th 86th 87th 88th 89th 90th	Elected to finish Geyer's term. Re-elected in 1942. Re-elected in 1944. Re-elected in 1946. Re-elected in 1948. Re-elected in 1950. Re-elected in 1952. Re-elected in 1954. Re-elected in 1956. Re-elected in 1958. Re-elected in 1960. Re-elected in 1962. Re-elected in 1964. Re-elected in 1966. Retired.	Los Angeles
Glenn M. Anderson (Los Angeles)	Democratic	January 3, 1969 – January 3, 1973	91st 92nd	Elected in 1968. Re-elected in 1970. Redistricted to the 35th district.	Los Angeles
Pete McCloskey (Portola Valley)	Republican	January 3, 1973 – January 3, 1975	93rd	Redistricted from the 11th district and re-elected in 1972. Redistricted to the 12th district	Southern San Mateo, small part of northwestern Santa Clara
John Hans Krebs (Fresno)	Democratic	January 3, 1975 – January 3, 1979	94th 95th	Elected in 1974. Re-elected in 1976. Lost re-election.	Eastern Fresno, Kings, northwestern Tulare
Charles 'Chip' Pashayan (Fresno)	Republican	January 3, 1979 – January 3, 1991	96th 97th 98th 99th 100th 101st	Elected in 1978. Re-elected in 1980. Re-elected in 1982. Re-elected in 1984. Re-elected in 1986. Re-elected in 1988. Lost re-election.	Eastern Fresno, Kings, northwestern Tulare
Charles 'Chip' Pashayan (Fresno)	Republican	January 3, 1979 – January 3, 1991	96th 97th 98th 99th 100th 101st	Elected in 1978. Re-elected in 1980. Re-elected in 1982. Re-elected in 1984. Re-elected in 1986. Re-elected in 1988. Lost re-election.	Eastern Fresno, Kings, Kern (Bakersfield), Tulare
Cal Dooley (Visalia)	Democratic	January 3, 1991 – January 3, 1993	102nd	Elected in 1990. Redistricted to the 20th district.	Eastern Fresno, Kings, Kern (Bakersfield), Tulare
Leon Panetta (Carmel Valley)	Democratic	January 3, 1993 – January 23, 1993	103rd	Redistricted from the 16th district and re-elected in 1992. Resigned after being appointed Director of the OMB.	Monterey, San Benito, southern Santa Cruz
Vacant		January 23, 1993 – June 8, 1993	103rd		Monterey, San Benito, southern Santa Cruz
Sam Farr (Carmel)	Democratic	June 8, 1993 – January 3, 2013	103rd 104th 105th 106th 107th 108th 109th 110th 111th 112th	Elected to finish Panetta's term. Re-elected in 1994. Re-elected in 1996. Re-elected in 1998. Re-elected in 2000. Re-elected in 2002. Re-elected in 2004. Re-elected in 2006. Re-elected in 2008. Re-elected in 2010. Redistricted to the 20th district.	Monterey, San Benito, southern Santa Cruz
Sam Farr (Carmel)	Democratic	June 8, 1993 – January 3, 2013	103rd 104th 105th 106th 107th 108th 109th 110th 111th 112th	Elected to finish Panetta's term. Re-elected in 1994. Re-elected in 1996. Re-elected in 1998. Re-elected in 2000. Re-elected in 2002. Re-elected in 2004. Re-elected in 2006. Re-elected in 2008. Re-elected in 2010. Redistricted to the 20th district.	2003–2013 Monterey, San Benito, southern Santa Cruz
Mike Honda (San Jose)	Democratic	January 3, 2013 – January 3, 2017	113th 114th	Redistricted from the 15th district and re-elected in 2012. Re-elected in 2014. Lost re-election.	2013–2023 Southern Alameda, western Santa Clara
Ro Khanna (Fremont)	Democratic	January 3, 2017 – present	115th 116th 117th 118th 119th	Elected in 2016. Re-elected in 2018. Re-elected in 2020. Re-elected in 2022. Re-elected in 2024. Re-elected in 2026.	2013–2023 Southern Alameda, western Santa Clara
Ro Khanna (Fremont)	Democratic	January 3, 2017 – present	115th 116th 117th 118th 119th	Elected in 2016. Re-elected in 2018. Re-elected in 2020. Re-elected in 2022. Re-elected in 2024. Re-elected in 2026.	2023–present

== Election results ==
=== 1932 ===
1932 United States House of Representatives elections in California
Party	Candidate	Votes	%
Democratic	Charles J. Colden	50,720	62.2
Republican	A. E. Henning	26,868	32.9
Liberty	Ernest E. Debs	3,965	4.9
Total votes		81,553	100.0
Turnout			
Democratic win (new seat)			

=== 1934 ===
1934 United States House of Representatives elections in California
Party	Candidate	Votes	%
Democratic	Charles J. Colden (incumbent)	60,045	70.4
Republican	C. P. "Cap" Wright	20,508	24.0
Socialist	Richard Pomeroy	4,721	5.6
Total votes		85,274	100.0
Turnout			
Democratic hold			

=== 1936 ===
1936 United States House of Representatives elections in California
Party	Candidate	Votes	%
Democratic	Charles J. Colden (incumbent)	68,189	71.9
Republican	Leonard Roach	24,981	26.3
Communist	John L. Leech	1,634	1.8
Total votes		94,804	100.0
Turnout			
Democratic hold			

=== 1938 ===
1938 United States House of Representatives elections in California
Party	Candidate	Votes	%
Democratic	Lee E. Geyer (incumbent)	56,513	58.8
Republican	Clifton A. Hix	26,891	28.0
Townsend	Fred C. Wagner	8,870	9.2
Progressive Party (United States, 1924)	Robert O. Bates	3,774	3.9
Total votes		96,048	100.0
Turnout			
Democratic hold			

=== 1940 ===
1940 United States House of Representatives elections in California
Party	Candidate	Votes	%
Democratic	Lee E. Geyer (incumbent)	75,109	65.5
Republican	Clifton A. Hix	32,862	28.6
Progressive Party (United States, 1924)	Samuel C. Converse	5,649	4.9
Communist	Harry L. Gray	1,118	1.0
Total votes		114,738	100.0
Turnout			
Democratic hold			

=== 1942 (Special) ===
Democrat Cecil R. King won the special election to replace fellow Democrat Lee E. Geyer, who died in office. Data for this special election is not available.

=== 1942 ===
1942 United States House of Representatives elections in California
Party	Candidate	Votes	%
Democratic	Cecil R. King (incumbent)	92,260	100.0
Turnout			
Democratic hold			

=== 1944 ===
1944 United States House of Representatives elections in California
Party	Candidate	Votes	%
Democratic	Cecil R. King (incumbent)	147,217	100.0
Turnout			
Democratic hold			

=== 1946 ===
1946 United States House of Representatives elections in California
Party	Candidate	Votes	%
Democratic	Cecil R. King (incumbent)	110,654	100.0
Turnout			
Democratic hold			

=== 1948 ===
1948 United States House of Representatives elections in California
Party	Candidate	Votes	%
Democratic	Cecil R. King (incumbent)	194,782	100.0
Turnout			
Democratic hold			

=== 1950 ===
1950 United States House of Representatives elections in California
Party	Candidate	Votes	%
Democratic	Cecil R. King (incumbent)	166,334	100.0
Turnout			
Democratic hold			

=== 1952 ===
1952 United States House of Representatives elections in California
Party	Candidate	Votes	%
Democratic	Cecil R. King (incumbent)	114,650	54.6
Republican	Robert H. Finch	92,587	44.1
Progressive	Loyd C. Seelinger	2,738	1.3
Total votes		209,975	100.0
Turnout			
Democratic hold			

=== 1954 ===
1954 United States House of Representatives elections in California
Party	Candidate	Votes	%
Democratic	Cecil R. King (incumbent)	97,828	60.1
Republican	Robert H. Finch	64,967	39.9
Total votes		162,795	100.0
Turnout			
Democratic hold			

=== 1956 ===
1956 United States House of Representatives elections in California
Party	Candidate	Votes	%
Democratic	Cecil R. King (incumbent)	157,270	64.9
Republican	Charles A. Franklin	84,900	35.1
Total votes		242,170	100.0
Turnout			
Democratic hold			

=== 1958 ===
1958 United States House of Representatives elections in California
Party	Candidate	Votes	%
Democratic	Cecil R. King (incumbent)	182,965	75.3
Republican	Charles A. Franklin	59,973	24.7
Total votes		242,938	100.0
Turnout			
Democratic hold			

=== 1960 ===
1960 United States House of Representatives elections in California
Party	Candidate	Votes	%
Democratic	Cecil R. King (incumbent)	206,620	67.7
Republican	Tom Coffee	98,510	32.3
Total votes		305,130	100.0
Turnout			
Democratic hold			

=== 1962 ===
1962 United States House of Representatives elections in California
Party	Candidate	Votes	%
Democratic	Cecil R. King (incumbent)	74,964	73.8
Republican	Ted Bruinsma	36,663	26.2
Total votes		111,627	100.0
Turnout			
Democratic hold			

=== 1964 ===
1964 United States House of Representatives elections in California
Party	Candidate	Votes	%
Democratic	Cecil R. King (incumbent)	95,640	67.7
Republican	Robert Muncaster	45,688	32.3
Total votes		141,328	100.0
Turnout			
Democratic hold			

=== 1966 ===
1966 United States House of Representatives elections in California
Party	Candidate	Votes	%
Democratic	Cecil R. King (incumbent)	76,962	60.8
Republican	Don Cortum	49,615	39.2
Total votes		126,577	100.0
Turnout			
Democratic hold			

=== 1968 ===
1968 United States House of Representatives elections in California
Party	Candidate	Votes	%
Democratic	Glenn M. Anderson	75,070	50.7
Republican	Joe Blatchford	71,174	48.1
Peace and Freedom	Ben Dobbs	1,685	1.1
Total votes		147,929	100.0
Turnout			
Democratic hold			

=== 1970 ===
1970 United States House of Representatives elections in California
Party	Candidate	Votes	%
Democratic	Glenn M. Anderson (inc.)	83,739	62.2
Republican	Vernon E. Brown	47,778	35.5
American Independent	Robert W. Copeland	1,724	1.3
Peace and Freedom	Thomas E. Mathews	1,292	1.0
Total votes		134,533	100.0
Turnout			
Democratic hold			

=== 1972 ===
1972 United States House of Representatives elections in California
Party	Candidate	Votes	%
Republican	Pete McCloskey (incumbent)	110,098	60.2
Democratic	James Stewart	72,759	39.8
Total votes		182,857	100.0
Turnout			
Republican hold			

=== 1974 ===
1974 United States House of Representatives elections in California
Party	Candidate	Votes	%
Democratic	John Hans Krebs	66,082	51.9
Republican	Bob Mathias (incumbent)	61,242	48.1
Total votes		127,324	100.0
Turnout			
Democratic gain from Republican			

=== 1976 ===
1976 United States House of Representatives elections in California
Party	Candidate	Votes	%
Democratic	John Hans Krebs (incumbent)	103,898	65.7
Republican	Henry J. Andreas	54,270	34.3
Total votes		158,168	100.0
Turnout			
Democratic hold			

=== 1978 ===
1978 United States House of Representatives elections in California
Party	Candidate	Votes	%
Republican	Charles (Chip) Pashayan	81,296	54.5
Democratic	John Hans Krebs (incumbent)	67,885	45.5
Total votes		149,181	100.0
Turnout			
Republican gain from Democratic			

=== 1980 ===
1980 United States House of Representatives elections in California
Party	Candidate	Votes	%
Republican	Charles (Chip) Pashayan (inc.)	129,159	70.6
Democratic	Willard H. "Bill" Johnson	53,780	29.4
Total votes		182,939	100.0
Turnout			
Republican hold			

=== 1982 ===
1982 United States House of Representatives elections in California
Party	Candidate	Votes	%
Republican	Charles (Chip) Pashayan (inc.)	80,271	54
Democratic	Gene Tackett	68,364	46
Total votes		148,635	100
Turnout			
Republican hold			

=== 1984 ===
1984 United States House of Representatives elections in California
Party	Candidate	Votes	%
Republican	Charles (Chip) Pashayan (incumbent)	128,802	72.5
Democratic	Simon Lakritz	48,888	27.5
Total votes		177,690	100.0
Turnout			
Republican hold			

=== 1986 ===
1986 United States House of Representatives elections in California
Party	Candidate	Votes	%
Republican	Charles (Chip) Pashayan (incumbent)	88,787	60.2
Democratic	John Hartnett	58,682	39.8
Total votes		147,469	100.0
Turnout			
Republican hold			

=== 1988 ===
1988 United States House of Representatives elections in California
Party	Candidate	Votes	%
Republican	Charles (Chip) Pashayan (incumbent)	129,568	71.5
Democratic	Vincent J. Lavery	51,730	28.5
Total votes		181,298	100.0
Turnout			
Republican hold			

=== 1990 ===
1990 United States House of Representatives elections in California
Party	Candidate	Votes	%
Democratic	Cal Dooley	82,611	54.5
Republican	Charles (Chip) Pashayan (incumbent)	68,848	45.5
Total votes		151,459	100.0
Turnout			
Democratic gain from Republican			

=== 1992 ===
1992 United States House of Representatives elections in California
Party	Candidate	Votes	%
Democratic	Leon Panetta (incumbent)	151,565	72.1
Republican	Bill McCampbell	49,947	23.7
Peace and Freedom	Maureen Smith	4,804	2.3
Libertarian	John D. Wilkes	4,051	1.9
Total votes		210,447	100.0
Turnout			
Democratic hold			

=== 1993 (Special) ===
List of special elections to the United States House of Representatives in California
Party	Candidate	Votes	%
Democratic	Sam Farr	53,675	52.25
Republican	Bill McCampbell	43,774	42.61
American Independent	Jerome N. McCready	1,689	1.64
Green	Kevin Gary Clark	1,226	1.19
Libertarian	Richard J. Quigley	948	0.92
Independent	Peter James	943	0.92
Independent	James Ogle	444	0.43
No party	Tom Shannon (write-in)	33	0.03
Total votes		102,732	100.00
Turnout			
Democratic hold			

=== 1994 ===
1994 United States House of Representatives elections in California
Party	Candidate	Votes	%
Democratic	Sam Farr (incumbent)	87,222	52.17
Republican	Bill McCampbell	74,830	44.49
Green	E. Craig Coffin	5,591	3.34
Total votes		167,193	100.0
Turnout			
Democratic hold			

=== 1996 ===
1996 United States House of Representatives elections in California
Party	Candidate	Votes	%
Democratic	Sam Farr (incumbent)	115,116	58.9
Republican	Jess Brown	73,856	37.8
Natural Law	John Black	6,573	3.3
Total votes		195,545	100.0
Turnout			
Democratic hold			

=== 1998 ===
1998 United States House of Representatives elections in California
Party	Candidate	Votes	%
Democratic	Sam Farr (incumbent)	103,719	64.55
Republican	Bill McCampbell	52,470	32.65
Libertarian	Rick Garrett	2,791	1.74
Natural Law	Scott R. Hartley	1,710	1.06
Total votes		160,690	100.0
Turnout			
Democratic hold			

=== 2000 ===
2000 United States House of Representatives elections in California
Party	Candidate	Votes	%
Democratic	Sam Farr (incumbent)	143,219	68.7
Republican	Clint Engler	51,557	24.7
Green	E. Craig Coffin	8,215	4.0
Libertarian	Rick S. Garrett	2,510	1.2
Reform	Larry Fenton	2,263	1.0
Natural Law	Scott R. Hartley	996	0.4
Total votes		208,760	100.0
Turnout			
Democratic hold			

=== 2002 ===
2002 United States House of Representatives elections in California
Party	Candidate	Votes	%
Democratic	Sam Farr (incumbent)	101,632	68.1
Republican	Clint Engler	40,334	27.1
Green	Ray Glock-Grueneich	4,885	3.2
Libertarian	Jascha Lee	2,418	1.6
No party	Alan Shugart (write-in)	27	0.0
Turnout		149,296	
Democratic hold			

=== 2004 ===
2004 United States House of Representatives elections in California
Party	Candidate	Votes	%
Democratic	Sam Farr (incumbent)	148,958	66.8
Republican	Mark Risley	65,117	29.2
Green	Ray Glock-Grueneich	3,645	1.7
Peace and Freedom	Joe Williams	2,823	1.2
Libertarian	Joel Smolen	2,607	1.1
No party	David Mauricio Munoz (write-in)	75	0.0
Turnout		282,941	
Democratic hold			

=== 2006 ===
2006 United States House of Representatives elections in California
Party	Candidate	Votes	%
Democratic	Sam Farr (incumbent)	120,750	75.9
Republican	Anthony R. DeMaio	35,932	22.5
No party	Jeff Edward Taylor (write-in)	2,611	1.6
Total votes		163,293	100.0
Turnout			
Democratic hold			

=== 2008 ===
2008 United States House of Representatives elections in California
Party	Candidate	Votes	%
Democratic	Sam Farr (incumbent)	168,907	73.9
Republican	Jeff Taylor	59,037	25.9
independent (politician)	Peter Andresen (write-in)	682	0.2
Total votes		228,626	100.0
Turnout			
Democratic hold			

=== 2010 ===
2010 United States House of Representatives elections in California
Party	Candidate	Votes	%
Democratic	Sam Farr (incumbent)	118,734	66.69
Republican	Jeff Taylor	47,133	26.47
Libertarian	Mary V. Larkin	8,753	4.92
Green	Eric Petersen	3,429	1.93
Total votes		178,049	100.00
Turnout			
Democratic hold			

=== 2012 ===
2012 United States House of Representatives elections in California
Party	Candidate	Votes	%
Democratic	Mike Honda (incumbent)	159,392	73.5
Republican	Evelyn Li	57,336	26.5
Total votes		216,728	100.0
Democratic hold			

=== 2014 ===
2014 United States House of Representatives elections in California
Party	Candidate	Votes	%
Democratic	Mike Honda (incumbent)	69,561	52%
Democratic	Ro Khanna	64,847	48%
Total votes		134,378	100.0%
Democratic hold			

=== 2016 ===
2016 United States House of Representatives elections in California
Party	Candidate	Votes	%
Democratic	Ro Khanna	142,268	61%
Democratic	Mike Honda (incumbent)	90,924	39%
Total votes		233,192	100.0%
Democratic hold			

=== 2018 ===
2018 United States House of Representatives elections in California
Party	Candidate	Votes	%
Democratic	Ro Khanna (incumbent)	159,105	75.3%
Republican	Ron Cohen	52,057	24.7%
Total votes		211,162	100.0%
Democratic hold			

=== 2020 ===
2020 United States House of Representatives elections in California
Party	Candidate	Votes	%
Democratic	Ro Khanna (incumbent)	212,137	71.3
Republican	Ritesh Tandon	85,199	28.7
Total votes		297,336	100.0
Democratic hold			

=== 2022 ===
2022 United States House of Representatives elections in California
Party	Candidate	Votes	%
Democratic	Ro Khanna (incumbent)	127,853	70.9
Republican	Ritesh Tandon	52,400	29.1
Total votes		180,253	100.0
Democratic hold			

=== 2024 ===
2024 United States House of Representatives elections in California
Party	Candidate	Votes	%
Democratic	Ro Khanna (incumbent)	172,462	67.7
Republican	Anita Chen	82,415	32.3
Total votes		254,877	100.0
Democratic hold			

== Historical district boundaries ==
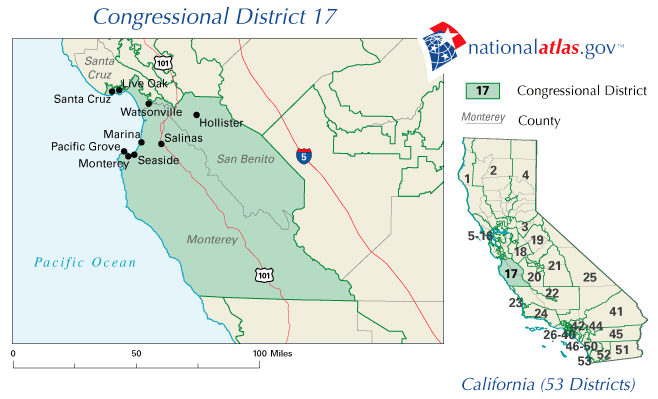
2003 – 2013

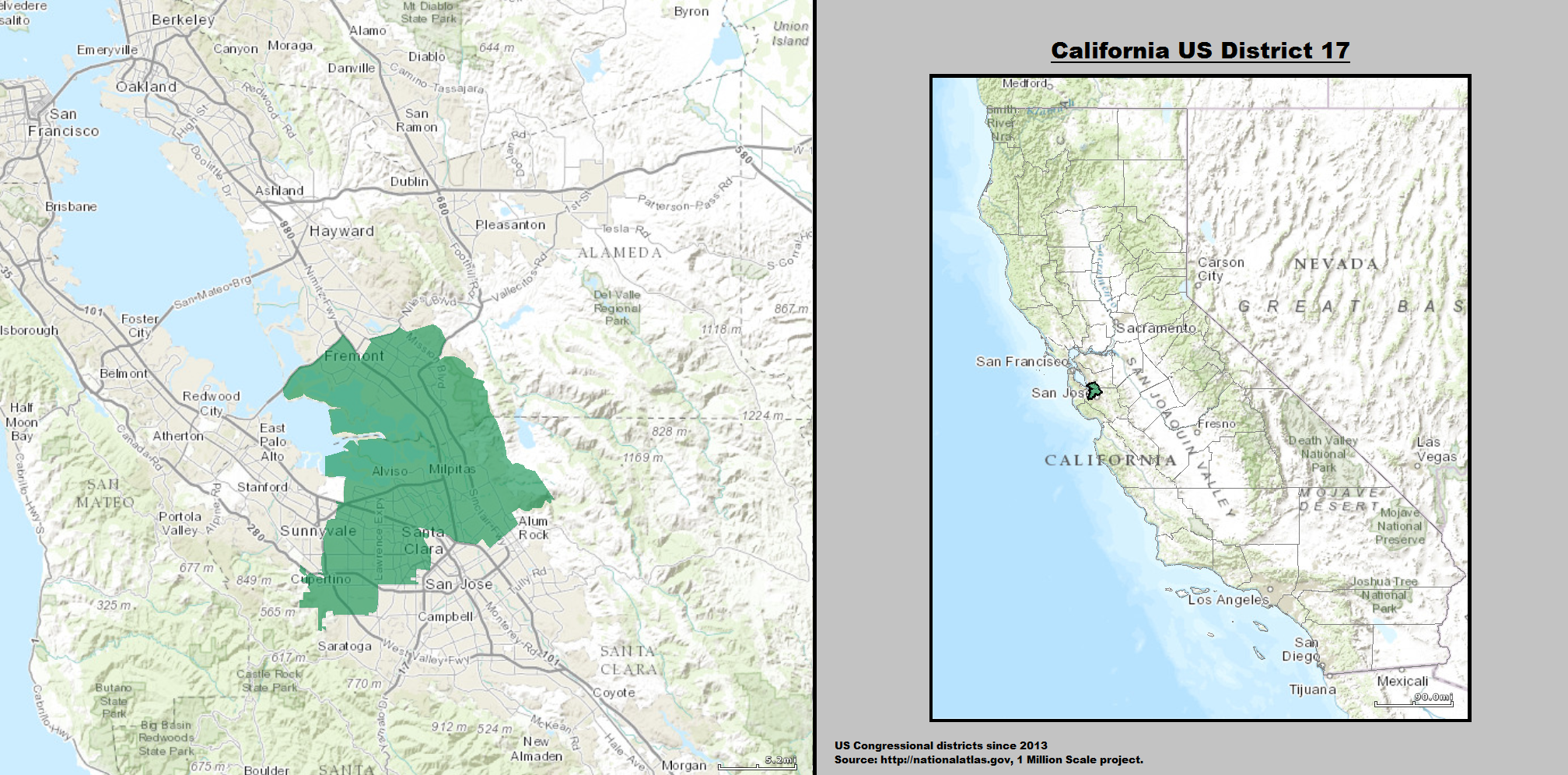
2013 – 2023

== See also ==
- List of United States congressional districts
- California's congressional districts
