= 1992 United States House of Representatives elections in California =

- November 3, 1992

All 52 California seats to the United States House of Representatives
	Majority party	Minority party
Party	Democratic	Republican
Last election	26	19
Seats won	30	22
Seat change	▲4	▲3
Popular vote	5,436,965	4,365,155
Percentage	51.66%	41.47%
- Results: Democratic hold Democratic gain Republican hold Republican gain

The United States House of Representatives elections in California, 1992 was an election for California's delegation to the United States House of Representatives, which occurred as part of the general election of the House of Representatives on November 3, 1992. California gained seven seats after the 1990 census, five of which were won by Republicans and two by Democrats. Of California's already-existing seats, Democrats won three Republican-held seats while Republicans won one Democratic-held seat.

== Overview ==
United States House of Representatives elections in California, 1992
Party	Votes	%	Before	After	+/–
Democratic	5,436,965	51.66%	26	30	+4
Republican	4,365,155	41.47%	19	22	+3
Libertarian	330,834	3.14%	0	0	0
Peace and Freedom	267,827	2.54%	0	0	0
Green	77,110	0.73%	0	0	0
Independent	29,375	0.28%	0	0	0
American Independent	10,843	0.10%	0	0	0
Write-ins	7,406	0.07%	0	0	0
Invalid or blank votes	839,363	7.39%	—	—	—
Totals	11,364,878	100.00%	45	52	+7

== Results ==
Final results from the Secretary of State of California:

=== District 1 ===
California's 1st congressional district election, 1992
Party	Candidate	Votes	%
Democratic	Dan Hamburg	119,676	47.64
Republican	Frank Riggs (incumbent)	113,266	45.09
Peace and Freedom	Phil Baldwin	10,764	4.28
Libertarian	Matthew L. Howard	7,500	2.99
Invalid or blank votes		12,612	4.78
Total votes		263,818	100.00
Turnout			
Democratic gain from Republican			

=== District 2 ===
California's 2nd congressional district election, 1992
Party	Candidate	Votes	%
Republican	Wally Herger (incumbent)	167,247	65.19
Democratic	Elliot Roy Freedman	71,780	27.98
Libertarian	Harry H. "Doc" Pendery	17,529	6.83
Invalid or blank votes		17,133	6.26
Total votes		273,689	100.00
Turnout			
Republican hold			

=== District 3 ===
California's 3rd congressional district election, 1992
Party	Candidate	Votes	%
Democratic	Vic Fazio (incumbent)	112,149	51.18
Republican	H. L. Richardson	96,092	40.26
Libertarian	Ross Crain	20,444	8.57
Invalid or blank votes		12,611	5.02
Total votes		241,296	100.00
Turnout			
Democratic hold			

=== District 4 ===
California's 4th congressional district election, 1992
Party	Candidate	Votes	%
Republican	John Doolittle (incumbent)	141,155	49.81
Democratic	Patricia Malberg	129,489	45.70
Libertarian	Patrick Lee McHargue	12,705	4.48
No party	Don Brooksher (write-in)	16	0.00
Invalid or blank votes		13,004	4.39
Total votes		296,269	100.00
Turnout			
Republican hold			

=== District 5 ===
California's 5th congressional district election, 1992
Party	Candidate	Votes	%
Democratic	Robert Matsui (incumbent)	158,250	68.64
Republican	Robert S. Dinsmore	58,698	25.46
American Independent	Gordon Mors	4,745	2.06
Libertarian	Chris J. Rufer	4,547	1.97
Green	Tian Harter	4,316	1.87
No party	Jan L. Bergeron (write-in)	4	0.00
Invalid or blank votes		13,113	5.38
Total votes		243,673	100.00
Turnout			
Democratic hold			

=== District 6 ===
California's 6th congressional district election, 1992
Party	Candidate	Votes	%
Democratic	Lynn Woolsey	190,322	65.23
Republican	Bill Filante	98,171	33.64
No party	Claude Heater (write-in)	3,141	1.08
No party	Louis G. Beary (write-in)	152	0.05
Invalid or blank votes		17,742	5.73
Total votes		309,528	100.00
Turnout			
Democratic hold			

=== District 7 ===
California's 7th congressional district election, 1992
Party	Candidate	Votes	%
Democratic	George Miller (incumbent)	153,320	70.34
Republican	Dave Scholl	54,822	25.15
Peace and Freedom	David L. Franklin	9,840	4.51
Invalid or blank votes		19,243	8.11
Total votes		237,225	100.00
Turnout			
Democratic hold			

=== District 8 ===
California's 8th congressional district election, 1992
Party	Candidate	Votes	%
Democratic	Nancy Pelosi (incumbent)	191,906	82.47
Republican	Marc Wolin	25,693	11.04
Peace and Freedom	Cesar G. Cadabes	7,572	3.25
Libertarian	James R. Elwood	7,511	3.23
No party	Michael Goldwater (write-in)	9	0.00
Invalid or blank votes		22,748	8.91
Total votes		245,439	100.00
Turnout			
Democratic hold			

=== District 9 ===
California's 9th congressional district election, 1992
Party	Candidate	Votes	%
Democratic	Ronald Dellums (incumbent)	164,265	71.90
Republican	G. William "Billy" Hunter	53,707	23.51
Peace and Freedom	Dave Linn	10,472	4.58
No party	Omari Musa (write-in)	23	0.01
Invalid or blank votes		17,588	7.15
Total votes		246,055	100.00
Turnout			
Democratic hold			

=== District 10 ===
California's 10th congressional district election, 1992
Party	Candidate	Votes	%
Republican	Bill Baker	145,702	51.96
Democratic	Wendell H. Williams	134,635	48.01
No party	Dave Williams (write-in)	55	0.02
No party	Valerie Janloia (write-in)	37	0.01
Invalid or blank votes		26,382	8.60
Total votes		306,811	100.00
Turnout			
Republican win (new seat)			

=== District 11 ===
California's 11th congressional district election, 1992
Party	Candidate	Votes	%
Republican	Richard Pombo	94,453	47.59
Democratic	Patti Garamendi	90,539	45.61
Libertarian	Christine Roberts	13,498	6.80
Invalid or blank votes		10,896	5.20
Total votes		209,386	100.00
Turnout			
Republican win (new seat)			

=== District 12 ===
California's 12th congressional district election, 1992
Party	Candidate	Votes	%
Democratic	Tom Lantos (incumbent)	157,205	68.83
Republican	Jim R. Tomlin	53,278	23.33
Peace and Freedom	Mary Weldon	10,142	4.44
Libertarian	George L. O'Brien	7,782	3.41
Invalid or blank votes		20,818	8.35
Total votes		249,225	100.00
Turnout			
Democratic hold			

=== District 13 ===
California's 13th congressional district election, 1992
Party	Candidate	Votes	%
Democratic	Pete Stark (incumbent)	123,795	60.24
Republican	Verne W. Teyler	64,953	31.60
Peace and Freedom	Roslyn A. Allen	16,768	8.16
Invalid or blank votes		15,979	7.21
Total votes		221,495	100.00
Turnout			
Democratic hold			

=== District 14 ===
California's 14th congressional district election, 1992
Party	Candidate	Votes	%
Democratic	Anna Eshoo	146,873	56.66
Republican	Tom Huening	101,202	39.04
Libertarian	Chuck Olson	7,220	2.79
Peace and Freedom	David Wald	3,912	1.51
No party	Richard Sims (write-in)	12	0.00
No party	Dave Maginnis (write-in)	3	0.00
Invalid or blank votes		15,584	5.67
Total votes		274,816	100.00
Turnout			
Democratic gain from Republican			

=== District 15 ===
California's 15th congressional district election, 1992
Party	Candidate	Votes	%
Democratic	Norm Mineta (incumbent)	168,617	63.54
Republican	Robert Wick	82,875	31.23
Libertarian	Duggan Dieterly	13,293	5.01
No party	Bill Futrell (write-in)	585	0.22
Invalid or blank votes		15,696	5.58
Total votes		281,066	100.00
Turnout			
Democratic hold			

=== District 16 ===
California's 16th congressional district election, 1992
Party	Candidate	Votes	%
Democratic	Don Edwards (incumbent)	96,661	62.01
Republican	Ted Bundesen	49,843	31.97
Peace and Freedom	Amani S. Kummba	9,370	6.01
No party	Andrew Hunt (write-in)	5	0.00
No party	Carl Loeber (write-in)	3	0.00
No party	Peter James (write-in)	1	0.00
Invalid or blank votes		13,360	7.89
Total votes		169,243	100.00
Turnout			
Democratic hold			

=== District 17 ===
California's 17th congressional district election, 1992
Party	Candidate	Votes	%
Democratic	Leon Panetta (incumbent)	151,565	72.05
Republican	Bill McCampbell	49,947	23.74
Peace and Freedom	Maureen Smith	4,804	2.28
Libertarian	John D. Wilkes	4,051	1.93
Invalid or blank votes		7,684	3.52
Total votes		218,131	100.00
Turnout			
Democratic hold			

=== District 18 ===
California's 18th congressional district election, 1992
Party	Candidate	Votes	%
Democratic	Gary Condit (incumbent)	139,704	84.66
Libertarian	Kim R. Almstrom	25,307	15.34
Invalid or blank votes		22,226	11.87
Total votes		187,237	100.00
Turnout			
Democratic hold			

=== District 19 ===
California's 19th congressional district election, 1992
Party	Candidate	Votes	%
Democratic	Richard Lehman (incumbent)	101,619	46.91
Republican	Tal L. Cloud	100,590	46.43
Peace and Freedom	Dorothy L. Wells	13,334	6.15
No party	James E. Williams, Jr. (write-in)	1,097	0.51
Invalid or blank votes		12,964	5.65
Total votes		229,604	100.00
Turnout			
Democratic hold			

=== District 20 ===
California's 20th congressional district election, 1992
Party	Candidate	Votes	%
Democratic	Cal Dooley (incumbent)	72,679	64.85
Republican	Ed Hunt	39,388	35.15
Invalid or blank votes		12,053	9.71
Total votes		124,120	100.00
Turnout			
Democratic hold			

=== District 21 ===
California's 21st congressional district election, 1992
Party	Candidate	Votes	%
Republican	Bill Thomas (incumbent)	127,758	65.19
Democratic	Deborah A. Vollmer	68,058	34.73
No party	Mike Hodges (write-in)	149	0.08
Invalid or blank votes		16,394	7.72
Total votes		212,359	100.00
Turnout			
Republican hold			

=== District 22 ===
California's 22nd congressional district election, 1992
Party	Candidate	Votes	%
Republican	Michael Huffington	131,242	52.51
Democratic	Gloria Ochoa	87,328	34.94
Green	Mindy Lorenz	23,699	9.48
Libertarian	William Howard Dilbeck	7,553	3.02
No party	Richard Bialosky (write-in)	104	0.04
Invalid or blank votes		16,163	6.07
Total votes		266,089	100.00
Turnout			
Republican hold			

=== District 23 ===
California's 23rd congressional district election, 1992
Party	Candidate	Votes	%
Republican	Elton Gallegly (incumbent)	115,504	54.26
Democratic	Anita Perez Ferguson	88,225	41.44
Libertarian	Jay C. Wood	9,091	4.27
No party	Edward L. Dunbar, Jr. (write-in)	61	0.03
Invalid or blank votes		10,698	4.78
Total votes		223,579	100.00
Turnout			
Republican hold			

=== District 24 ===
California's 24th congressional district election, 1992
Party	Candidate	Votes	%
Democratic	Anthony C. Beilenson (incumbent)	141,742	55.53
Republican	Tom McClintock	99,835	39.11
Peace and Freedom	John Paul Lindblad	13,690	5.36
Invalid or blank votes		18,919	6.90
Total votes		274,186	100.00
Turnout			
Democratic hold			

=== District 25 ===
California's 25th congressional district election, 1992
Party	Candidate	Votes	%
Republican	Howard McKeon	113,611	51.94
Democratic	James H. Gilmartin	72,233	33.03
Independent	Rick Pamplin	13,930	6.37
Libertarian	Peggy L. Christensen	6,932	3.17
Green	Charles Wilken	6,919	3.16
Peace and Freedom	Nancy Lawrence	5,090	2.33
Invalid or blank votes		18,899	7.95
Total votes		237,614	100.00
Turnout			
Republican win (new seat)			

=== District 26 ===
California's 26th congressional district election, 1992
Party	Candidate	Votes	%
Democratic	Howard Berman (incumbent)	73,807	61.04
Republican	Gary E. Forsch	36,453	30.15
Peace and Freedom	Margery Hinds	7,180	5.94
Libertarian	Bernard Zimring	3,468	2.87
Invalid or blank votes		11,592	8.75
Total votes		132,500	100.00
Turnout			
Democratic hold			

=== District 27 ===
California's 27th congressional district election, 1992
Party	Candidate	Votes	%
Republican	Carlos J. Moorhead (incumbent)	105,521	49.67
Democratic	Doug Kahn	83,805	39.45
Green	Jesse A. Moorman	11,003	5.18
Peace and Freedom	Margaret L. Edwards	7,329	3.45
Libertarian	Dennis Decherd	4,790	2.25
No party	Peter Ballantyne (write-in)	2	0.00
Invalid or blank votes		16,138	7.06
Total votes		228,588	100.00
Turnout			
Republican hold			

=== District 28 ===
California's 28th congressional district election, 1992
Party	Candidate	Votes	%
Republican	David Dreier (incumbent)	122,353	58.44
Democratic	Al Wachtel	76,525	36.55
Green	Walt Contreras Sheasby	6,233	2.98
Libertarian	Thomas J. Dominy	4,271	2.04
Invalid or blank votes		16,946	7.49
Total votes		226,328	100.00
Turnout			
Republican hold			

=== District 29 ===
California's 29th congressional district election, 1992
Party	Candidate	Votes	%
Democratic	Henry Waxman (incumbent)	160,312	61.31
Republican	Mark Robbins	67,141	25.68
Independent	David Davis	15,445	5.91
Peace and Freedom	Susan C. Davies	13,888	5.31
Libertarian	Felix Tsvi Rogin	4,699	1.80
No party	Yaakov M. Vann (write-in)	1	0.00
Invalid or blank votes		23,198	8.15
Total votes		284,684	100.00
Turnout			
Democratic hold			

=== District 30 ===
California's 30th congressional district election, 1992
Party	Candidate	Votes	%
Democratic	Xavier Becerra	48,800	58.41
Republican	Morry Waksberg	20,034	23.98
Green	Blase Bonpane	6,315	7.56
Peace and Freedom	Elizabeth A. Nakano	6,173	7.39
Libertarian	Andrew "Drew" Consalvo	2,221	2.66
Invalid or blank votes		9,853	10.55
Total votes		93,396	100.00
Turnout			
Democratic hold			

=== District 31 ===
California's 31st congressional district election, 1992
Party	Candidate	Votes	%
Democratic	Matthew G. Martinez (incumbent)	68,324	62.57
Republican	Reuben D. Franco	40,873	37.43
No party	Alaric Arrender (write-in)	0	0.00
Invalid or blank votes		10,239	8.57
Total votes		119,436	100.00
Turnout			
Democratic hold			

=== District 32 ===
California's 32nd congressional district election, 1992
Party	Candidate	Votes	%
Democratic	Julian C. Dixon (incumbent)	150,644	87.17
Libertarian	Robert G. "Bob" Weber Jr.	12,834	7.17
Peace and Freedom	William R. Williams II	9,782	5.66
No party	Carole Lynn Leanick-Beltran (W/I)	2	0.00
Invalid or blank votes		23,529	11.98
Total votes		196,791	100.00
Turnout			
Democratic hold			

=== District 33 ===
California's 33rd congressional district election, 1992
Party	Candidate	Votes	%
Democratic	Lucille Roybal-Allard	32,010	63.04
Republican	Robert Guzman	15,428	30.38
Peace and Freedom	Tim Delia	2,135	4.20
Libertarian	Dale S. Olvera	1,206	2.37
Invalid or blank votes		5,397	9.61
Total votes		56,176	100.00
Turnout			
Democratic win (new seat)			

=== District 34 ===
California's 34th congressional district election, 1992
Party	Candidate	Votes	%
Democratic	Esteban Torres (incumbent)	91,738	61.27
Republican	J. Jay Hernandez	50,907	34.00
Libertarian	Carl M. "Marty" Swinney	7,072	4.72
No party	M. V. Paul Worland (write-in)	1	0.00
Invalid or blank votes		11,426	7.09
Total votes		161,144	100.00
Turnout			
Democratic hold			

=== District 35 ===
California's 35th congressional district election, 1992
Party	Candidate	Votes	%
Democratic	Maxine Waters (incumbent)	102,941	82.50
Republican	Nate Truman	17,417	13.96
Peace and Freedom	Alice Mae Miles	2,797	2.24
Libertarian	Carin Rogers	1,618	1.30
No party	Gordon Mego (write-in)	3	0.00
Invalid or blank votes		10,170	7.54
Total votes		134,946	100.00
Turnout			
Democratic hold			

=== District 36 ===
California's 36th congressional district election, 1992
Party	Candidate	Votes	%
Democratic	Jane Harman	125,751	48.41
Republican	Joan Milke Flores	109,684	42.23
Green	Richard Greene	13,297	5.12
Peace and Freedom	Owen Stanley	5,519	2.12
Libertarian	Marc F. Denny	5,504	2.12
No party	Larry Martz (write-in)	2	0.00
Invalid or blank votes		17,745	6.39
Total votes		277,502	100.00
Turnout			
Democratic hold			

=== District 37 ===
California's 37th congressional district election, 1992
Party	Candidate	Votes	%
Democratic	Walter R. Tucker III (incumbent)	97,159	85.73
Peace and Freedom	B. Kwaku Duren	16,178	14.27
Invalid or blank votes		15,717	12.18
Total votes		129,054	100.00
Turnout			
Democratic hold			

=== District 38 ===
California's 38th congressional district election, 1992
Party	Candidate	Votes	%
Republican	Steve Horn	92,038	48.61
Democratic	Evan Anderson Braude	82,108	43.37
Peace and Freedom	Paul Burton	8,391	4.43
Libertarian	Blake Ashley	6,756	3.57
No party	James P. Brown, Sr. (write-in)	14	0.01
No party	Roy Lydell Venable, Jr. (write-in)	14	0.00
Invalid or blank votes		17,160	8.31
Total votes		206,481	100.00
Turnout			
Republican gain from Democratic			

=== District 39 ===
California's 39th congressional district election, 1992
Party	Candidate	Votes	%
Republican	Ed Royce	122,472	57.31
Democratic	Molly McClanahan	81,728	38.25
Libertarian	Jack Dean	9,484	4.44
Invalid or blank votes		20,449	8.73
Total votes		234,133	100.00
Turnout			
Republican hold			

=== District 40 ===
California's 40th congressional district election, 1992
Party	Candidate	Votes	%
Republican	Jerry Lewis (incumbent)	129,563	63.11
Democratic	Donald M. "Don" Rusk	63,881	31.12
Peace and Freedom	Margie Akin	11,839	5.77
Invalid or blank votes		17,757	7.96
Total votes		223,040	100.00
Turnout			
Republican hold			

=== District 41 ===
California's 41st congressional district election, 1992
Party	Candidate	Votes	%
Republican	Jay Kim	101,753	59.62
Democratic	Bob Baker	58,777	34.44
Peace and Freedom	James Michael "Mike" Noonan	10,136	5.94
Invalid or blank votes		18,185	9.63
Total votes		188,851	100.00
Turnout			
Republican win (new seat)			

=== District 42 ===
California's 42nd congressional district election, 1992
Party	Candidate	Votes	%
Democratic	George Brown, Jr. (incumbent)	79,780	50.67
Republican	Dick Rutan	69,251	43.98
Libertarian	Fritz R. Ward	8,424	5.35
Invalid or blank votes		14,913	8.65
Total votes		172,368	100.00
Turnout			
Democratic hold			

=== District 43 ===
California's 43rd congressional district election, 1992
Party	Candidate	Votes	%
Republican	Ken Calvert	88,987	46.68
Democratic	Mark A. Takano	88,468	46.41
American Independent	Gary Odom	6,095	3.20
Libertarian	Gene L. Berkman	4,989	2.62
No party	John Schwab (write-in)	2,100	1.10
Invalid or blank votes		13,210	6.48
Total votes		203,849	100.00
Turnout			
Republican win (new seat)			

=== District 44 ===
California's 44th congressional district election, 1992
Party	Candidate	Votes	%
Republican	Al McCandless (incumbent)	110,333	54.21
Democratic	Georgia Smith	81,693	40.14
Libertarian	Phil Turner	11,515	5.66
No party	John Yench (write-in)	0	0.00
Invalid or blank votes		14,731	6.75
Total votes		218,272	100.00
Turnout			
Republican hold			

=== District 45 ===
California's 45th congressional district election, 1992
Party	Candidate	Votes	%
Republican	Dana Rohrabacher (incumbent)	123,731	54.50
Democratic	Patricia "Pat" McCabe	88,508	38.99
Libertarian	Gary David Copeland	14,777	6.51
Invalid or blank votes		26,901	10.59
Total votes		253,917	100.00
Turnout			
Republican hold			

=== District 46 ===
California's 46th congressional district election, 1992
Party	Candidate	Votes	%
Republican	Bob Dornan (incumbent)	55,659	50.23
Democratic	Robert John Banuelos	45,435	41.00
Libertarian	Richard G. Newhouse	9,712	8.77
Invalid or blank votes		10,819	8.90
Total votes		121,625	100.00
Turnout			
Republican hold			

=== District 47 ===
California's 47th congressional district election, 1992
Party	Candidate	Votes	%
Republican	Christopher Cox (incumbent)	165,004	64.90
Democratic	John F. Anwiler	76,924	30.25
Peace and Freedom	Maxine Bell Quirk	12,297	4.84
No party	Barry M. Charles (write-in)	32	0.01
Invalid or blank votes		27,400	9.73
Total votes		271,657	100.00
Turnout			
Republican hold			

=== District 48 ===
California's 48th congressional district election, 1992
Party	Candidate	Votes	%
Republican	Ron Packard (incumbent)	140,935	61.14
Democratic	Michael P. "Mike" Farber	67,415	29.25
Peace and Freedom	Donna White	13,396	5.81
Libertarian	Ted Lowe	8,749	3.80
Invalid or blank votes		20,056	8.00
Total votes		250,551	100.00
Turnout			
Republican hold			

=== District 49 ===
California's 49th congressional district election, 1992
Party	Candidate	Votes	%
Democratic	Lynn Schenk	127,280	51.14
Republican	Judy Jarvis	106,170	42.66
Libertarian	John Wallner	10,706	4.30
Peace and Freedom	Milton Zaslow	4,738	1.90
No party	Perry T. Thompson (write-in)	4	0.00
Invalid or blank votes		20,191	7.50
Total votes		269,089	100.00
Turnout			
Democratic win (new seat)			

=== District 50 ===
California's 50th congressional district election, 1992
Party	Candidate	Votes	%
Democratic	Bob Filner	77,293	56.57
Republican	Tony Valencia	39,531	28.93
Libertarian	Barbara Hutchinson	15,489	11.34
Peace and Freedom	Roger Bruce Batchelder	4,250	3.11
No party	Lincoln Pickard (write-in)	63	0.05
Invalid or blank votes		10,579	7.19
Total votes		147,205	100.00
Turnout			
Democratic gain from Republican			

=== District 51 ===
California's 51st congressional district election, 1992
Party	Candidate	Votes	%
Republican	Duke Cunningham (incumbent)	141,890	56.08
Democratic	Bea Herbert	85,148	33.66
Libertarian	Bill Holmes	10,309	4.07
Peace and Freedom	Miriam Clark	10,307	4.07
Green	Richard Roe	5,328	2.11
No party	Kathleen E. Johnson (write-in)	13	0.01
Invalid or blank votes		21,527	7.84
Total votes		284,522	100.00
Turnout			
Republican hold			

=== District 52 ===
California's 52nd congressional district election, 1992
Party	Candidate	Votes	%
Republican	Duncan Hunter (incumbent)	112,995	52.85
Democratic	Janet M. Gastil	88,076	41.20
Libertarian	Joe Shea	6,977	3.26
Peace and Freedom	Dennis P. Gretsinger	5,734	2.68
No party	David Marmon (write-in)	2	0.00
Invalid or blank votes		13,026	5.74
Total votes		226,810	100.00
Turnout			
Republican hold			

== See also ==
- 103rd United States Congress
- Political party strength in California
- Political party strength in U.S. states
- 1992 United States House of Representatives elections
