= Matthew G. Martínez =

American politician (1929–2011)

Marty Martínez
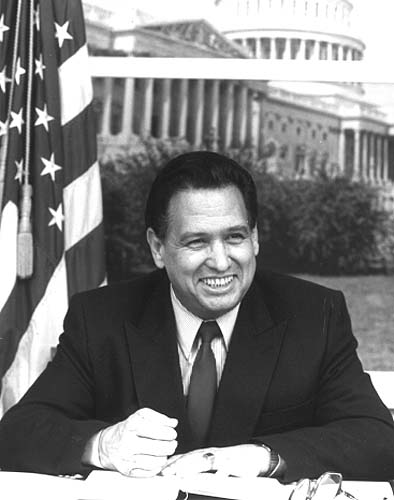

Member of the U.S. House of Representatives from California
- In office July 13, 1982 – January 3, 2001
- Preceded by: George E. Danielson
- Succeeded by: Hilda Solis
- Constituency: 30th district (1982–1993); 31st district (1993–2001)

Member of the California State Assembly from the 59th district
- In office December 1, 1980 – July 15, 1982
- Preceded by: Jack R. Fenton
- Succeeded by: Charles Calderon

Personal details
- Born: Matthew Gilbert Martínez; February 14, 1929 Walsenburg, Colorado, U.S.
- Died: October 15, 2011 (aged 82) Fredericksburg, Virginia, U.S.
- Party: Republican (before 1974, 2000–2011); Democratic (1974–2000)
- Children: Diane (daughter)
- Education: Los Angeles Trade-Technical College (attended)

Military service
- Branch/service: United States Marine Corps
- Rank: Private first class
- Battles/wars: World War II

Matthew Gilbert "Marty" Martínez (February 14, 1929 – October 15, 2011) was an American politician who served as the U.S. representative from California's 30th congressional district from 1982 to 1993 and California's 31st congressional district from 1993 to 2001, both as a member of the Democratic Party and the Republican Party. Martínez switched parties to become a Republican after being defeated in a 2000 primary.

== Early life ==
Martínez's family moved to Los Angeles when he was young, and he attended public schools in Los Angeles. In 1949 he graduated from Roosevelt High School. From 1947 to 1950 he served in the U.S. Marine Corps, achieving the rank of private first class. In 1956 he received a certificate of competence from the Los Angeles Trade-Technical College.

For the next fifteen years he owned and operated a custom furniture upholstery company and worked as a building contractor.

== Political career ==
He began his political career in 1971 when he became a member of the Monterey Park Planning Commission, and served until 1974 when he was elected to the Monterey Park City Council. He served until 1980, including two terms as mayor in 1974 and 1980.

=== State assembly ===
In 1980, Martínez defeated incumbent Jack R. Fenton in the Democratic primary election in California's 59th State Assembly district. He was elected to the California State Assembly with no major-party opponent.

=== Congress ===
In 1982 George E. Danielson left the U.S. House of Representatives to take the bench. Martínez won the special election to succeed him, and was reelected nine times by varying margins.

In his first term in Congress he was assigned to the Education and Labor Committee. In the 99th Congress (1985–87) he chaired the Subcommittee on Employment Opportunities. In 1991, he became the Chairman of the Human Resources Subcommittee. In 1992, Martínez was named to the Foreign Affairs Committee, and served on the Subcommittee on International Security, International Organizations and Human Rights.

=== Defeat ===
In 2000, Martínez was defeated in the Democratic primary by liberal State Senator Hilda Solis 62% to 29%. She charged that he was out of touch with his district when he voted to ban partial-birth abortion and opposed gun control. He was both Roman Catholic and a member of the National Rifle Association. While he had been a reliably Democratic vote on most issues throughout his congressional career, after his primary loss Martínez began to vote overwhelmingly with Republicans. On July 27, 2000, Martínez switched to the Republican Party, arguing that the Democrats had abandoned him. There was no Republican candidate on the ballot in the district for the 2000 election, and Martínez declined to attempt a write-in candidacy, though he remained critical of Solis and promised to stay active in the Republican Party. His term in Congress ended on January 3, 2001, at the end of the 106th Congress.

== Family ==
Martínez was married to Elvira Yorba Martinez, with whom he had five children: Matthew Adrian, Michael Gilbert, Diane, Susan, and Carol Ann. His daughter, Diane Martínez, served in the State Assembly from 1992 to 1998.

== Death ==
On October 15, 2011, Martínez died at his home in Fredericksburg, Virginia. He had suffered from congestive heart failure.

== Memberships ==
- San Gabriel Valley YMCA board of directors
- Hispanic American Democrats
- National Association of Latino Elected and Appointed Officials
- Communications Workers of America
- Veterans of Foreign Wars
- American Legion
- Latin Business Association
- Monterey Park Chamber of Commerce
- Navy League (director)
- Rotary International

== Electoral history ==
Matthew Martinez electoral history

1982 California's 30th congressional district special election
Party	Candidate	Votes	%
Democratic	Matthew G. Martínez	14,593	51.0
Republican	Ralph Roy Ramirez	14,043	49.0
Total votes		28,636	100.0
Democratic hold			

1982 United States House of Representatives elections in California
Party	Candidate	Votes	%
Democratic	Matthew G. Martínez (Incumbent)	60,905	53.9
Republican	John H. Rousselot (Incumbent)	52,177	46.1
Total votes		113,082	100.0
Democratic hold			

1984 United States House of Representatives elections in California
Party	Candidate	Votes	%
Democratic	Matthew G. Martínez (Incumbent)	64,378	51.8
Republican	Richard Gomez	53,900	43.4
American Independent	Houston A. Meyers	6,055	4.8
Total votes		124,333	100.0
Democratic hold			

1986 United States House of Representatives elections in California
Party	Candidate	Votes	%
Democratic	Matthew G. Martínez (Incumbent)	59,369	62.5
Republican	John W. Almquist	33,705	35.5
Libertarian	Kim J. Goldsworthy	1,911	2.0
Total votes		94,985	100.0
Democratic hold			

1988 United States House of Representatives elections in California
Party	Candidate	Votes	%
Democratic	Matthew G. Martínez (Incumbent)	72,253	59.9
Republican	Ralph Roy Ramirez	43,833	25.5
American Independent	Houston A. Myers	2,694	2.2
Libertarian	Kim J. Goldsworthy	1,864	1.5
Total votes		120,644	100.0
Democratic hold			

1990 United States House of Representatives elections in California
Party	Candidate	Votes	%
Democratic	Matthew G. Martínez (Incumbent)	45,456	58.2
Republican	Reuben D. Franco	28,914	37.0
Libertarian	George Curtis Feger	3,713	4.8
Total votes		78,083	100.0
Democratic hold			

1992 United States House of Representatives elections in California
Party	Candidate	Votes	%
Democratic	Matthew G. Martínez (Incumbent)	68,324	62.6
Republican	Reuben D. Franco	40,873	37.4
Total votes		109,197	100.0
Democratic hold			

1994 United States House of Representatives elections in California
Party	Candidate	Votes	%
Democratic	Matthew G. Martínez (Incumbent)	50,541	59.1
Republican	John V. Flores	34,926	40.9
Total votes		85,467	100.0
Democratic hold			

1996 United States House of Representatives elections in California
Party	Candidate	Votes	%
Democratic	Matthew G. Martínez (Incumbent)	69,285	67.5
Republican	John Flores	28,705	28.0
Libertarian	Michael Everling	4,700	4.5
Total votes		102,690	100.0
Democratic hold			

1998 United States House of Representatives elections in California
Party	Candidate	Votes	%
Democratic	Matthew G. Martínez (Incumbent)	61,173	70.0
Republican	Frank C. Moreno	19,786	22.7
Green	Krista Lieberg-Wong	4,377	5.0
Libertarian	Michael B. Everling	1,121	1.3
Natural Law	Gary Hearne	903	1.03
Total votes		87,360	100.0
Democratic hold			

=== 2000 ===
2000 United States House of Representatives elections in California
Party	Candidate	Votes	%
Democratic	Hilda Solis	89,600	79.4
Green	Krista Lieberg-Wong	10,294	9.1
Libertarian	Michael McGuire	7,138	6.3
Natural Law	Richard D. Griffin	5,882	5.2
Total votes		112,914	100.0
Democratic gain from Republican			

== See also ==
- List of American politicians who switched parties in office
- List of Hispanic and Latino Americans in the United States Congress
- List of United States representatives who switched parties

U.S. House of Representatives
Preceded by George E. Danielson	Member of the U.S. House of Representatives from California's 30th congressional district 1982–1993	Succeeded by Xavier Becerra
Preceded by Bill Richardson	Chair of the Congressional Hispanic Caucus; 1985–1986	Succeeded by Esteban Edward Torres
Preceded by Mervyn M. Dymally	Member of the U.S. House of Representatives from California's 31st congressional district 1993–2001	Succeeded by Hilda Solis
