= John Hans Krebs =

American politician

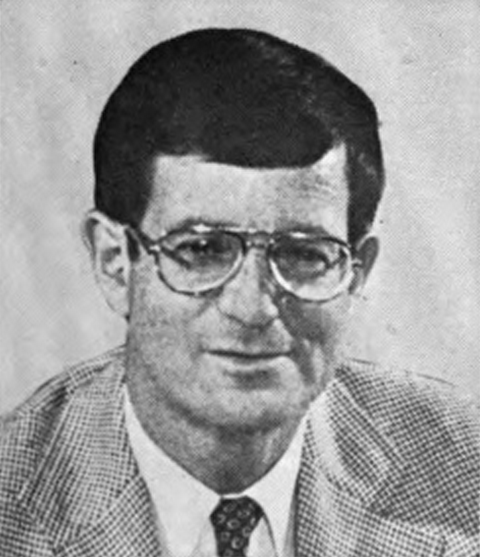
- Krebs, c. 1975

Member of the U.S. House of Representatives from California's 17th district
- In office January 3, 1975 – January 3, 1979
- Preceded by: Bob Mathias
- Succeeded by: Chip Pashayan

Personal details
- Born: John Hans Krebs; December 17, 1926 Berlin, Weimar Republic (now Germany)
- Died: November 10, 2014 (aged 87) Fresno, California, U.S.
- Party: Democratic
- Spouse: Hanna Krebs
- Education: University of California at Berkeley (AB); University of California, Hastings (JD)
- Profession: Attorney

Military service
- Allegiance: United States; Israel
- Branch/service: United States Army; Haganah
- Years of service: 1945 (Haganah); 1952 – 1954 (U.S. Army)
- Rank: Corporal (U.S. Army)

John Hans Krebs (December 17, 1926 – November 10, 2014) was an Israeli-American politician and attorney who served two terms as a U.S. representative for California's 17th congressional district from 1975 to 1979.

== Early life and education ==
Born in 1926 in Berlin, then in the Weimar Republic (now Germany), Krebs moved to British-mandated Palestine in 1933 and attended Balfour School (elementary), 1937. He graduated from Ben Yehuda College in 1945. As a young man, he volunteered for Haganah, a Jewish paramilitary group that supported the creation of an Israeli state. Afterward, he immigrated to America in 1946 and obtained United States citizenship in 1954. He earned an A.B., University of California at Berkeley in 1950 and an LL.B. from the University of California, Hastings College of the Law in 1957.

== Career ==
He was admitted to the California bar in 1957 and commenced practice in Fresno in 1958. He served in United States Army from 1952 to 1954 and was a translator stationed in Germany. While in the army, he was a corporal in the infantry. Krebs served as a member of the Fresno County Planning Commission from 1965 to 1969 and on the Fresno County Board of Supervisors from 1970 to 1974. He served as delegate, California State Democratic convention, 1966.

=== Congress ===
Krebs was elected as a Democrat to the Ninety-fourth Congress, defeating four-term Republican Bob Mathias by a 52% to 48% margin. He served in the Ninety-fourth and Ninety-fifth Congresses (January 3, 1975 – January 3, 1979). Because he grew up in the British League of Nations Mandate of Palestine (known as Mandatory Palestine) and held a passport from Mandatory Palestine before emigrating to the United States, Krebs is considered by The Jewish Press to have been the first Palestinian American to serve in Congress. However, other sources, including Haaretz, consider John E. Sununu to have been the first Palestinian American to have served in Congress.

He was an unsuccessful candidate for reelection in 1978 to the Ninety-sixth Congress, losing to Charles Pashayan, Jr.

He was a resident of Fresno, California.

== Death and legacy ==
Krebs died on November 10, 2014, in Fresno, California. The John Krebs Wilderness in Sequoia National Park was named after him in 2009.

== Electoral history ==
1974 United States House of Representatives elections in California
Party	Candidate	Votes	%
Democratic	John Hans Krebs	66,082	51.9
Republican	Bob Mathias (incumbent)	61,242	48.1
Total votes		127,324	100.0
Turnout			
Democratic gain from Republican			

1976 United States House of Representatives elections in California
Party	Candidate	Votes	%
Democratic	John Hans Krebs (incumbent)	103,898	65.7
Republican	Henry J. Andreas	54,270	34.3
Total votes		158,168	100.0
Turnout			
Democratic hold			

1978 United States House of Representatives elections in California
Party	Candidate	Votes	%
Republican	Charles (Chip) Pashayan	81,296	54.5
Democratic	John Hans Krebs (incumbent)	67,885	45.5
Total votes		149,181	100.0
Turnout			
Republican gain from Democratic			

== See also ==
- List of Jewish members of the United States Congress

U.S. House of Representatives
Preceded by Bob Mathias	Member of the U.S. House of Representatives from California's 17th congressional district 1975–1979	Succeeded by Chip Pashayan
