= Anita Perez Ferguson =

Speaker, author and international consultant from Los Angeles

- Born: March 2, 1949
- Spouse: Bill Ferguson

Anita Perez Ferguson, born in 1949 in Los Angeles, California, is a speaker, author and international consultant.

She has a BA in communications from Westmont College (1971), an MA in counseling psychology from the University of Santa Clara, and an MA in management from the University of Redlands. She also has a PhD in human and organizational systems from Fielding University (2010).

== Background ==
In 1990, Perez Ferguson was the Democratic candidate for the US House of Representatives in California's 19th congressional district. In 1992, she was the Democratic candidate for the U.S. House of Representatives in California's 23rd congressional district.

Perez Ferguson has been a lecturer for the Woodrow Wilson Foundation at Princeton and a contributor to National Public Radio. She is a past president of the National Women's Political Caucus.

Under President Bill Clinton, she served as the White House Liaison to the United States Department of Transportation. Clinton also appointed her to serve as chair of the Inter-American Foundation.

She has been a television panelist featured on shows like To the Contrary. Hispanic Business magazine named her to its list, "The 100 Most Influential Hispanics in the United States."

== Published works ==
- 1999 A Passion for Politics
- 2007 Women Seen and Heard
- 2020 Twisted Cross
- 2021 Golden Secrets
- 2023 Broken Promises

== See also ==
- Mexican American writers
