= California's 29th congressional district =

U.S. House district for California

Coordinates: 34°16′00″N 118°25′49″W

- Interactive map of district boundaries
- Representative: Luz Rivas; D–Los Angeles
- Population (2025): 736,935
- Median household income: $82,256
- Ethnicity: 64.3% Hispanic; 21.4% White; 7.8% Asian; 3.7% Black; 2.0% Two or more races; 0.8% other
- Cook PVI: D+20

California's 29th congressional district is a congressional district in the U.S. state of California based in the north central San Fernando Valley. The district is represented by Democrat Luz Rivas.

It includes the city of San Fernando, as well as the Los Angeles communities of Van Nuys, Pacoima, Arleta, Panorama City, Sylmar, and parts of Sun Valley and North Hollywood.

With a Cook Partisan Voting Index of D+20, the district is tied with the 14th District as the 13th-most liberal out of the 52 districts in California.

== Recent election results from statewide races ==
=== 2023–2027 boundaries ===
Year	Office	Results
2008	President	Obama 76% - 24%
2010	Governor	Brown 69% - 25%
2010	Lt. Governor	Newsom 62% - 26%
2010	Secretary of State	Bowen 67% - 22%
2010	Attorney General	Harris 59% - 31%
2010	Treasurer	Lockyer 70% - 22%
2010	Controller	Chiang 66% - 22%
2012	President	Obama 79% - 21%
2014	Governor	Brown 74% - 26%
2016	President	Clinton 78% - 17%
2018	Governor	Newsom 78% - 22%
2018	Attorney General	Becerra 81% - 19%
2020	President	Biden 75% - 23%
2022	Senate (Reg.)	Padilla 76% - 24%
2022	Governor	Newsom 73% - 27%
2022	Lt. Governor	Kounalakis 72% - 28%
2022	Secretary of State	Weber 73% - 27%
2022	Attorney General	Bonta 73% - 27%
2022	Treasurer	Ma 71% - 29%
2022	Controller	Cohen 69% - 31%
2024	President	Harris 66% - 31%
2024	Senate (Reg.)	Schiff 68% - 32%

=== Composition ===
FIPS County Code	County	Seat	Population
37	Los Angeles	Los Angeles	9,663,345

Under the 2020 redistricting, California's 29th congressional district is within Los Angeles County, with half of it inside the City of Los Angeles. The area includes the city of San Fernando; and the northern Los Angeles neighborhoods of Van Nuys, Panorama City, Sylmar, Valley Village, Sun Valley, Pacoima, Toluca Lake, Valley Glen, Arleta, Mission Hills, part of Lake View Terrace, westside North Hollywood, and central Lake Balboa.

Los Angeles County is split between this district, the 27th district, the 30th district, and the 32nd district. The 29th and 27th are partitioned by Angeles National Forest, Soledad Canyon Road, Southern Pacific Railroad, Sand Canyon Road, Little Tujunga Canyon Road, Santa Clara Truck Trail, Veterans Memorial Park, Golden State Freeway, Devonshire Street, Blue Creek, Chatsworth Street, Balboa Boulevard, Kingsbury Street, Genesta Avenue, Aliso Canyon Wash, and Ronald Reagan Freeway. The 29th and 30th are partitioned by Angeles National Forest, NF-4N35, Gold Creek Road, Big Tujunga Canyon Road, Little Tujunga Road, Longford Street, Clybourne Avenue, Foothill Freeway, Kagel Canyon Street, Osborne Street, Terra Bella Street, Glenoaks Boulevard, Montague Street, San Fernando Road, Branford Street, Tujunga Wash, Wentworth Street, Sheldon Street, Tuxford Street, Sunland Boulevard, Golden State Freeway, Cohasset Street, Sherman Way, Vineland Avenue, Southern Pacific Railroad, Ledge Avenue, West Clark Avenue, North Clybourn Avenue, and the Los Angeles River. The 27th and 32nd are partitioned by San Diego Freeway, Roscoe Boulevard, Reseda Boulevard, Saticoy Street, Lull Street, Garden Grove Avenue, Valerio Street, Etiwanda Avenue, Gault Street, Victory Boulevard, Oxnard Street, Hazeltine Avenue, Burbank Boulevard, Tujunga Wash, Ventura Freeway, Hollywood Freeway, Whipple Street, and Lankershim Boulevard.

=== Cities and CDPs with 10,000 or more people ===
- Los Angeles - 3,820,914
- San Fernando - 23,685

== List of members representing the district ==
Member	Party	Dates	Cong ress(es)	Electoral history	Counties
District created January 3, 1953
John R. Phillips (Banning)	Republican	January 3, 1953 – January 3, 1957	83rd 84th	Redistricted from the 22nd district and re-elected in 1952. Re-elected in 1954. Retired.	1953–1963; Imperial, Riverside
Dalip Singh Saund (Westmoreland)	Democratic	January 3, 1957 – January 3, 1963	85th 86th 87th	Elected in 1956. Re-elected in 1958. Re-elected in 1960. Redistricted to the 38th district and lost re-election.	1953–1963; Imperial, Riverside
George Brown Jr. (Monterey Park)	Democratic	January 3, 1963 – January 3, 1971	88th 89th 90th 91st	Elected in 1962. Re-elected in 1964. Re-elected in 1966. Re-elected in 1968. Retired to run for US Senator.	1963–1969; Los Angeles
George Brown Jr. (Monterey Park)	Democratic	January 3, 1963 – January 3, 1971	88th 89th 90th 91st	Elected in 1962. Re-elected in 1964. Re-elected in 1966. Re-elected in 1968. Retired to run for US Senator.	1969–1973; Los Angeles
George E. Danielson (Los Angeles)	Democratic	January 3, 1971 – January 3, 1975	92nd 93rd	Elected in 1970. Re-elected in 1972. Redistricted to the 30th district.	1969–1973; Los Angeles
George E. Danielson (Los Angeles)	Democratic	January 3, 1971 – January 3, 1975	92nd 93rd	Elected in 1970. Re-elected in 1972. Redistricted to the 30th district.	1973–1975; Los Angeles
Augustus Hawkins (Los Angeles)	Democratic	January 3, 1975 – January 3, 1991	94th 95th 96th 97th 98th 99th 100th 101st	Redistricted from the 21st district and re-elected in 1974. Re-elected in 1976. Re-elected in 1978. Re-elected in 1980. Re-elected in 1982. Re-elected in 1984. Re-elected in 1986. Re-elected in 1988. Retired.	1975–1983; Los Angeles
Augustus Hawkins (Los Angeles)	Democratic	January 3, 1975 – January 3, 1991	94th 95th 96th 97th 98th 99th 100th 101st	Redistricted from the 21st district and re-elected in 1974. Re-elected in 1976. Re-elected in 1978. Re-elected in 1980. Re-elected in 1982. Re-elected in 1984. Re-elected in 1986. Re-elected in 1988. Retired.	1983–1993; South Central Los Angeles
Maxine Waters (Los Angeles)	Democratic	January 3, 1991 – January 3, 1993	102nd	Elected in 1990. Redistricted to the 35th district.	1983–1993; South Central Los Angeles
Henry Waxman (Los Angeles)	Democratic	January 3, 1993 – January 3, 2003	103rd 104th 105th 106th 107th	Redistricted from the 24th district and re-elected in 1992. Re-elected in 1994. Re-elected in 1996. Re-elected in 1998. Re-elected in 2000. Redistricted to the 30th district.	1993–2003; West Side Los Angeles
Adam Schiff (Burbank)	Democratic	January 3, 2003 – January 3, 2013	108th 109th 110th 111th 112th	Redistricted from the 27th district and re-elected in 2002. Re-elected in 2004. Re-elected in 2006. Re-elected in 2008. Re-elected in 2010. Redistricted to the 28th district.	2003–2013 Los Angeles (Burbank, Glendale, Pasadena)
Tony Cárdenas (Los Angeles)	Democratic	January 3, 2013 – January 3, 2025	113th 114th 115th 116th 117th 118th	Elected in 2012. Re-elected in 2014. Re-elected in 2016. Re-elected in 2018. Re-elected in 2020. Re-elected in 2022. Retired.	2013–2023 North Central San Fernando Valley
Tony Cárdenas (Los Angeles)	Democratic	January 3, 2013 – January 3, 2025	113th 114th 115th 116th 117th 118th	Elected in 2012. Re-elected in 2014. Re-elected in 2016. Re-elected in 2018. Re-elected in 2020. Re-elected in 2022. Retired.	2023–present North Central San Fernando Valley
Luz Rivas (Los Angeles)	Democratic	January 3, 2025 – present	119th	Elected in 2024. Re-elected in 2026.	2023–present North Central San Fernando Valley

== Election results ==
=== 1952 ===
1952 United States House of Representatives elections in California
Party	Candidate	Votes	%
Republican	John J. Phillips (Incumbent)	73,144	100.0
Republican hold			

=== 1954 ===
1954 United States House of Representatives elections in California
Party	Candidate	Votes	%
Republican	John J. Phillips (Incumbent)	42,420	58.0
Democratic	Bruce Shangle	30,781	42.0
Total votes		73,201	100.0
Republican hold			

=== 1956 ===
1956 United States House of Representatives elections in California
Party	Candidate	Votes	%
Democratic	Dalip Singh Saund	54,989	51.5
Republican	Jacqueline Cochran-Odlum	51,690	48.5
Total votes		106,679	100.0
Democratic gain from Republican			

=== 1958 ===
1958 United States House of Representatives elections in California
Party	Candidate	Votes	%
Democratic	Dalip Singh Saund (Incumbent)	64,518	62.4
Republican	John Babbage	38,899	37.6
Total votes		103,417	100.0
Democratic hold			

=== 1960 ===
1960 United States House of Representatives elections in California
Party	Candidate	Votes	%
Democratic	Dalip Singh Saund (Incumbent)	76,139	57.1
Republican	Charles H. Jameson	57,319	42.9
Total votes		133,458	100.0
Democratic hold			

=== 1962 ===
1962 United States House of Representatives elections in California
Party	Candidate	Votes	%
Democratic	George Brown, Jr.	73,740	55.7
Republican	H. L. Richardson, Jr.	58,760	44.3
Total votes		132,500	100.0
Democratic hold			

=== 1964 ===
1964 United States House of Representatives elections in California
Party	Candidate	Votes	%
Democratic	George Brown, Jr. (Incumbent)	90,208	58.6
Republican	Charles J. Farrington, Jr.	63,836	41.4
Total votes		154,044	100.0
Democratic hold			

=== 1966 ===
1966 United States House of Representatives elections in California
Party	Candidate	Votes	%
Democratic	George Brown, Jr. (Incumbent)	69,115	51.1
Republican	Bill Orozco	66,079	48.9
Total votes		135,194	100.0
Democratic hold			

=== 1968 ===
1968 United States House of Representatives elections in California
Party	Candidate	Votes	%
Democratic	George Brown, Jr. (Incumbent)	74,807	52.3
Republican	Bill Orozco	68,213	47.7
Total votes		143,020	100.0
Democratic hold			

=== 1970 ===
1970 United States House of Representatives elections in California
Party	Candidate	Votes	%
Democratic	George E. Danielson	71,308	62.6
Republican	Tom McMann	42,620	37.4
Total votes		113,928	100.0
Democratic hold			

=== 1972 ===
1972 United States House of Representatives elections in California
Party	Candidate	Votes	%
Democratic	George E. Danielson (Incumbent)	91,553	62.8
Republican	Richard E. Ferraro	48,814	33.5
Peace and Freedom	John W. Blaine	5,455	3.7
Total votes		145,822	100.0
Democratic hold			

=== 1974 ===
1974 United States House of Representatives elections in California
Party	Candidate	Votes	%
Democratic	Augustus F. Hawkins (Incumbent)	45,977	100.0
Democratic hold			

=== 1976 ===
1976 United States House of Representatives elections in California
Party	Candidate	Votes	%
Democratic	Augustus F. Hawkins (Incumbent)	82,515	85.5
Republican	Michael D. Germonprez	10,852	11.2
Independent	Sheila Leburg	3,235	3.3
Total votes		96,602	100.0
Democratic hold			

=== 1978 ===
1978 United States House of Representatives elections in California
Party	Candidate	Votes	%
Democratic	Augustus F. Hawkins (Incumbent)	65,214	85.0
Republican	Uriah J. Fields	11,512	15.0
Total votes		76,726	100.0
Democratic hold			

=== 1980 ===
1980 United States House of Representatives elections in California
Party	Candidate	Votes	%
Democratic	Augustus F. Hawkins (Incumbent)	80,095	86.1
Republican	Michael Arthur Hirt	10,282	11.1
Libertarian	Earl Smith	2,622	2.8
Total votes		92,999	100.0
Democratic hold			

=== 1982 ===
1982 United States House of Representatives elections in California
Party	Candidate	Votes	%
Democratic	Augustus F. Hawkins (Incumbent)	97,028	79.8
Republican	Milton R. Mackaig	24,568	20.2
Total votes		121,596	100.0
Democratic hold			

=== 1984 ===
1984 United States House of Representatives elections in California
Party	Candidate	Votes	%
Democratic	Augustus F. Hawkins (Incumbent)	108,777	86.6
Republican	Echo Y. Goto	16,781	13.4
Total votes		125,558	100.0
Democratic hold			

=== 1986 ===
1986 United States House of Representatives elections in California
Party	Candidate	Votes	%
Democratic	Augustus F. Hawkins (Incumbent)	78,132	84.6
Republican	John Van de Brooke	13,432	14.5
Libertarian	Waheed R. Boctor	851	0.9
Total votes		92,415	100.0
Democratic hold			

=== 1988 ===
1988 United States House of Representatives elections in California
Party	Candidate	Votes	%
Democratic	Augustus F. Hawkins (Incumbent)	88,169	82.8
Republican	Reuben D. Franco	14,543	13.7
Libertarian	Gregory P. Gilmore	3,724	3.5
Total votes		105,436	100.0
Democratic hold			

=== 1990 ===
1990 United States House of Representatives elections in California
Party	Candidate	Votes	%
Democratic	Maxine Waters	51,350	79.4
Republican	Bill DeWitt	12,054	18.6
Libertarian	Waheed R. Boctor	1,268	2.0
Total votes		64,672	100.0
Democratic hold			

=== 1992 ===
1992 United States House of Representatives elections in California
Party	Candidate	Votes	%
Democratic	Henry Waxman (Incumbent)	160,312	61.3
Republican	Mark Robbins	67,141	25.7
Independent	David Davis	15,445	5.9
Peace and Freedom	Susan C. Davies	13,888	5.3
Libertarian	Felix Tsvi Rogin	4,699	1.8
Independent	Vann (write-in)	1	0.0
Total votes		261,486	100.0
Democratic hold			

=== 1994 ===
1994 United States House of Representatives elections in California
Party	Candidate	Votes	%
Democratic	Henry Waxman (Incumbent)	129,413	66.1
Republican	Paul Stepanek	53,801	28.1
Libertarian	Mike Binkley	7,162	3.8
Total votes		190,376	100.0
Democratic hold			

=== 1996 ===
1996 United States House of Representatives elections in California
Party	Candidate	Votes	%
Democratic	Henry Waxman (Incumbent)	145,278	67.7
Republican	Paul Stepanek	52,857	24.6
Peace and Freedom	John Daley	8,819	4.1
Libertarian	Mike Binkley	4,766	2.2
Natural Law	Brian Rees	3,097	1.4
Total votes		214,817	100.0
Democratic hold			

=== 1998 ===
1998 United States House of Representatives elections in California
Party	Candidate	Votes	%
Democratic	Henry Waxman (Incumbent)	131,561	73.9
Republican	Mike Gottlieb	40,282	22.6
Libertarian	Mike Binkley	3,534	2.0
Natural Law	Karen Blasdell-Wilkinson	2,717	1.5
Total votes		178,094	100.0
Democratic hold			

=== 2000 ===
2000 United States House of Representatives elections in California
Party	Candidate	Votes	%
Democratic	Henry Waxman (Incumbent)	180,295	75.7
Republican	Jim Scileppi	45,784	19.3
Libertarian	Jack Anderson	7,944	3.3
Natural Law	Bruce Currivan	4,178	1.7
Total votes		238,201	100.0
Democratic hold			

=== 2002 ===
2002 United States House of Representatives elections in California
Party	Candidate	Votes	%
Democratic	Adam Schiff (Incumbent)	76,036	62.6
Republican	Jim Scileppi	40,676	33.4
Libertarian	Ted Brown	4,889	4.0
Total votes		121,541	100.0
Democratic hold			

=== 2004 ===
2004 United States House of Representatives elections in California
Party	Candidate	Votes	%
Democratic	Adam Schiff (Incumbent)	133,670	64.7
Republican	Harry Frank Scolinos	62,871	30.4
Green	Philip Koebel	5,715	2.7
Libertarian	Ted Brown	4,570	2.2
Independent	John Burton (write-in)	6	0.0
Total votes		206,832	100.0
Democratic hold			

=== 2006 ===
2006 United States House of Representatives elections in California
Party	Candidate	Votes	%
Democratic	Adam Schiff (Incumbent)	91,014	63.5
Republican	William J. Bodell	39,321	27.5
Green	William M. Paparian	8,197	5.7
Peace and Freedom	Lynda L. Llamas	2,599	1.8
Libertarian	Jim Keller	2,258	1.5
Independent	John Burton (write-in)	15	0.0
Total votes		143,404	100.0
Democratic hold			

=== 2008 ===
2008 United States House of Representatives elections in California
Party	Candidate	Votes	%
Democratic	Adam Schiff (Incumbent)	146,198	68.9
Republican	Charles Hahn	56,727	26.7
Libertarian	Alan Pyeatt	9,219	4.4
Democratic hold			

=== 2010 ===
2010 United States House of Representatives elections in California
Party	Candidate	Votes	%
Democratic	Adam Schiff (Incumbent)	104,374	64.8
Republican	John P. Colbert	51,534	32.0
Libertarian	William P. Cushing	5,218	3.2
Democratic hold			

=== 2012 ===
2012 United States House of Representatives elections in California
Party	Candidate	Votes	%
Democratic	Tony Cardenas	111,287	74.1
No party preference	David R. Hernandez	38,994	25.9
Total votes		150,281	100.0
Democratic hold			

=== 2014 ===
2014 United States House of Representatives elections in California
Party	Candidate	Votes	%
Democratic	Tony Cardenas (Incumbent)	50,096	74.6
Republican	William O'Callaghan Leader	17,045	25.4
Total votes		67,141	100.0
Democratic hold			

=== 2016 ===
2016 United States House of Representatives elections in California
Party	Candidate	Votes	%
Democratic	Tony Cardenas (Incumbent)	128,407	74.7
Democratic	Richard Alarcon	43,417	25.3
Total votes		171,824	100.0
Democratic hold			

=== 2018 ===
2018 United States House of Representatives elections in California
Party	Candidate	Votes	%
Democratic	Tony Cardenas (Incumbent)	124,697	80.6
Republican	Benito Benny Bernal	29,995	19.4
Total votes		154,692	100.0
Democratic hold			

=== 2020 ===
2020 United States House of Representatives elections in California
Party	Candidate	Votes	%
Democratic	Tony Cárdenas (incumbent)	119,420	56.6
Democratic	Angélica Dueñas	91,524	43.4
Total votes		210,944	100.0
Democratic hold			

=== 2022 ===
2022 United States House of Representatives elections in California
Party	Candidate	Votes	%
Democratic	Tony Cárdenas (incumbent)	69,915	58.5
Democratic	Angélica Dueñas	49,520	41.5
Total votes		119,435	100.0
Democratic hold			

=== 2024 ===
California's 29th congressional district, 2024
Primary election
Party	Candidate	Votes	%
Democratic	Luz Rivas	40,096	49.3
Republican	Benito Bernal	21,446	26.4
Democratic	Angelica Dueñas	19,844	24.4
Total votes		81,386	100.0
General election
Democratic	Luz Rivas	146,312	69.8
Republican	Benito Bernal	63,374	30.2
Total votes		209,686	100.0
Democratic hold			

== Historical district boundaries ==
2013–2023

From 2003 to 2013, the district consisted of parts of northern Los Angeles, including Burbank, Glendale and Pasadena. Due to redistricting after the 2010 United States census, the district shifted northwest within Los Angeles County and includes the northern San Fernando Valley.

== See also ==
- List of United States congressional districts
- California's congressional districts
