= East Whittier =

East Whittier may refer to:

- A Neighborhood of Whittier, California, formerly an unincorporated community
- East Whittier, California, formerly known as East La Mirada
