= California's 36th congressional district =

U.S. House district for California

Coordinates: 33°43′36″N 115°44′34″W

- Interactive map of district boundaries since January 3, 2023 (Note: The district includes the same census blocks as drawn by the Citizens Redistricting Commission in 2021 and during mid-decade redistricting as passed in Prop 50 (2025). As such, boundaries of the district will not change at the 2026 elections.)
- Representative: Ted Lieu; D–Torrance
- Area: 480 mi^{2} (1,200 km^{2})
- Population (2025): 753,592
- Median household income: $124,812
- Ethnicity: 55.5% White; 17.3% Asian; 16.6% Hispanic; 6.0% Two or more races; 3.4% Black; 1.1% other
- Cook PVI: D+21

California's 36th congressional district is a U.S. congressional district in California. The 36th district is located primarily in the South Bay and Westside regions of Los Angeles. It takes in the cities of Beverly Hills, Santa Monica, the west side of Culver City, Hermosa Beach, Rancho Palos Verdes, Redondo Beach, Palos Verdes Estates, Rolling Hills Estates, Rolling Hills, El Segundo, Lomita, Manhattan Beach, and the west side of Torrance, as well as the Los Angeles neighborhoods of Venice, Playa del Rey, Playa Vista, Palms, Cheviot Hills, Westwood Village, West Los Angeles, Mar Vista, Westchester, Marina Peninsula, and west side Harbor City.

The district is represented by Democrat Ted Lieu.

== Recent election results from statewide races ==
=== 2023–2033 boundaries ===
Year	Office	Results
2008	President	Obama 66%–33%
2010	Governor	Brown 57%–39%
2010	Lt. Governor	Newsom 57%–34%
2010	Secretary of State	Bowen 58%–35%
2010	Attorney General	Harris 47%–46%
2010	Treasurer	Lockyer 60%–34%
2010	Controller	Chiang 57%–35%
2012	President	Obama 64%–36%
2014	Governor	Brown 63%–37%
2016	President	Clinton 69%–25%
2018	Governor	Newsom 70%–30%
2018	Attorney General	Becerra 71%–29%
2020	President	Biden 71%–27%
2022	Senate (Reg.)	Padilla 69%–31%
2022	Governor	Newsom 67%–33%
2022	Lt. Governor	Kounalakis 68%–32%
2022	Secretary of State	Weber 68%–32%
2022	Attorney General	Bonta 66%–34%
2022	Treasurer	Ma 66%–34%
2022	Controller	Cohen 58%–42%
2024	President	Harris 68%–29%
2024	Senate (Reg.)	Schiff 67%–33%

== Composition ==
FIPS County Code	County	Seat	Population
37	Los Angeles	Los Angeles	9,663,345

Los Angeles County is split between this district, the 32nd district, the 30th district, the 37th district, the 43rd district, and the 44th district. The 36th and 32nd are partitioned by Adelaide Dr, 602 Kingman Dr-800 Woodacres Rd, The Riviera Country Club, 26th St, Montana Ave, S Bristol Ave, Wellesley Ave/Centinela Ave, 1009 Centinela Ave/1165Centinela Ave, Highway 2, Butler Ave, Purdue Ave, Cotner Ave, Pontius Ave, Santa Monica Blvd, Glendon Ave, Malcolm Ave, Wilshire Blvd, Veteran Ave, W Sunset Blvd, Tower Rd, Franklin Canyon Reservoir, Lago Vista Dr, Monte Cielo Dr, 1280 Coldwater Canyon Dr-1210 Coldwater Canyon Dr, Greystone Park, Ridgecrest Dr, Schuyler Rd, Cherokee Ln, Loma Vista Dr, 400 N Evelyn Pl-1966 Carla Ridge, Ridgemont Dr, Crescent Dr, 410 Martin Ln-1016 N Hillcrest Rd, Sierra Mar Dr, and La Collin Dr.

The 36th, 30th and 37th are partitioned by Phyllis Ave, N Doheny Dr, N Oakhurst Dr, Burton Way, N Robertson Blvd, 8733 Clifton Way-201 S Le Doux Rd, N San Vicente Blvd, La Cienga Park, S Le Doux Rd, Gregory Way, S Robertson Blvd, Whitworth Dr, Beverly Green Dr, 1271 Beverly Green Dr-1333 Beverly Green Dr, Heath Ave, S Moreno Dr, Highway 2, Century Park W, W Pico Blvd, Patricia Ave, Lorenzo Pl, Monte Mar Dr, Beverwill Dr, Castle Heights Ave, Club Dr, McConnell Dr, National Blvd, Palms Blvd, Overland Ave, Venice Blvd, Highway 405, W Havelock Ave, S St Nicholas Ave, Ballona Creek, and Centinela Creek Channel.

The 36th, 43rd and 44th are partitioned by W Florence Ave, Arbor Vitae St, Westchester Parkway, La Tijera Blvd, W 91st St, Cum Laude Ave, W 92nd St, Waterview St, Napoleon St, Vista Del Mar, W Imperial Highway, Aviation Blvd, Del Aire Park, E Sl Segundo Blvd, S Aviation Blvd, Marine Ave, Inglewood Ave, Highway 91, Redondo Beach Blvd, Hawthorne Blvd, Sepulveda Blvd, Normandie Ave, Frampton Ave, 253rd St, 255th St, Belle Porte Ave, 256th St, 1720 256th St-1733 256th St, 1701 257th St-1733 257th St, 1734 257th St-W 262nd St, Ozone Ave, 263rd St, 26302 Alta Vista Ave-26356 Alta Vista Ave, Pineknoll Ave, Leesdale Ave, Highway 213, Palos Verde Dr N, 26613 Leesdale Ave-Navy Field, S Western Ave, Westmont Dr, Eastview Park, Mt Rose Rd/Amelia Ave, 1102 W Bloomwood Rd-1514 Caddington Dr, N Western Ave, W Summerland St, N Enrose Ave/Miraleste Dr, Miraleste Dr, and the Martin J. Bogdanovich Recreation Center and Park.

=== Cities and CDPs with 10,000 or more people ===
- Los Angeles – 3,820,914
- Torrance – 147,067
- Santa Monica – 93,076
- Redondo Beach – 71,576
- Rancho Palos Verdes – 42,287
- Culver City – 40,779
- Manhattan Beach – 34,137
- Beverly Hills – 32,701
- Lomita – 20,921
- Hermosa Beach – 19,728
- El Segundo – 16,731
- Palos Verdes Estates – 13,347
- Marina del Rey – 11,373

=== 2,500 – 10,000 people ===
- Rolling Hills Estates – 8,280

== List of members representing the district ==
Member	Party	Dates	Cong ress(es)	Electoral history	Counties
District created January 3, 1963
Bob Wilson (San Diego)	Republican	January 3, 1963 – January 3, 1973	88th 89th 90th 91st 92nd	Redistricted from the 30th district and re-elected in 1962. Re-elected in 1964. Re-elected in 1966. Re-elected in 1968. Re-elected in 1970. Redistricted to the 40th district.	1963–1969; San Diego (City of San Diego)
Bob Wilson (San Diego)	Republican	January 3, 1963 – January 3, 1973	88th 89th 90th 91st 92nd	Redistricted from the 30th district and re-elected in 1962. Re-elected in 1964. Re-elected in 1966. Re-elected in 1968. Re-elected in 1970. Redistricted to the 40th district.	1969–1973; San Diego (City of San Diego)
William M. Ketchum (Paso Robles)	Republican	January 3, 1973 – January 3, 1975	93rd	Elected in 1972. Redistricted to the 18th district.	1973–1975; Kern, Kings, inland San Luis Obispo, coastal Santa Barbara
George Brown Jr. (Riverside)	Democratic	January 3, 1975 – January 3, 1993	94th 95th 96th 97th 98th 99th 100th 101st 102nd	Redistricted from the 38th district and re-elected in 1974. Re-elected in 1976. Re-elected in 1978. Re-elected in 1980. Re-elected in 1982. Re-elected in 1984. Re-elected in 1986. Re-elected in 1988. Re-elected in 1990. Redistricted to the 42nd district.	1975–1983; Riverside, San Bernardino (Inland Empire)
George Brown Jr. (Riverside)	Democratic	January 3, 1975 – January 3, 1993	94th 95th 96th 97th 98th 99th 100th 101st 102nd	Redistricted from the 38th district and re-elected in 1974. Re-elected in 1976. Re-elected in 1978. Re-elected in 1980. Re-elected in 1982. Re-elected in 1984. Re-elected in 1986. Re-elected in 1988. Re-elected in 1990. Redistricted to the 42nd district.	1983–1993; Riverside, San Bernardino (Inland Empire)
Jane Harman (Rolling Hills)	Democratic	January 3, 1993 – January 3, 1999	103rd 104th 105th	Elected in 1992. Re-elected in 1994. Re-elected in 1996. Retired to run for Governor of California.	1993–2003; Southwestern Los Angeles
Steven T. Kuykendall (Rancho Palos Verdes)	Republican	January 3, 1999 – January 3, 2001	106th	Elected in 1998. Lost re-election.	1993–2003; Southwestern Los Angeles
Jane Harman (Los Angeles)	Democratic	January 3, 2001 – February 28, 2011	107th 108th 109th 110th 111th 112th	Elected in 2000. Re-elected in 2002. Re-elected in 2004. Re-elected in 2006. Re-elected in 2008. Re-elected in 2010. Resigned to become Director of the Woodrow Wilson International Center for Scholars.	1993–2003; Southwestern Los Angeles
Jane Harman (Los Angeles)	Democratic	January 3, 2001 – February 28, 2011	107th 108th 109th 110th 111th 112th	Elected in 2000. Re-elected in 2002. Re-elected in 2004. Re-elected in 2006. Re-elected in 2008. Re-elected in 2010. Resigned to become Director of the Woodrow Wilson International Center for Scholars.	2003–2013 Southwestern Los Angeles
Vacant		February 28, 2011 – July 12, 2011	112th		2003–2013 Southwestern Los Angeles
Janice Hahn (Los Angeles)	Democratic	July 12, 2011 – January 3, 2013	112th	Elected to finish Harman's term. Redistricted to the 44th district.	2003–2013 Southwestern Los Angeles
Raul Ruiz (Coachella)	Democratic	January 3, 2013 – January 3, 2023	113th 114th 115th 116th 117th	Elected in 2012. Re-elected in 2014. Re-elected in 2016. Re-elected in 2018. Re-elected in 2020. Redistricted to the 25th district.	2013–2023 Eastern Riverside County (Palm Springs)
Ted Lieu (Torrance)	Democratic	January 3, 2023 – present	118th 119th	Redistricted from the 33rd district and re-elected in 2022. Re-elected in 2024. Re-elected in 2026.	2023–present: Westside of Los Angeles County and South Bay beach cities, including portions of Torrance and the entire Palos Verdes Peninsula within Los Angeles County

== Election results ==
=== 1962 ===
1962 United States House of Representatives elections in California
Party	Candidate	Votes	%
Republican	Bob Wilson (Incumbent)	91,626	61.8
Democratic	William C. Godfrey	56,637	38.2
Total votes		148,263	100.0
Republican hold			

=== 1964 ===
1964 United States House of Representatives elections in California
Party	Candidate	Votes	%
Republican	Bob Wilson (Incumbent)	105,346	59.1
Democratic	Quintin Whelan	73,034	40.9
Total votes		178,380	100.0
Republican hold			

=== 1966 ===
1966 United States House of Representatives elections in California
Party	Candidate	Votes	%
Republican	Bob Wilson (Incumbent)	119,274	72.9
Democratic	Don Lindgren	44,365	27.1
Total votes		163,639	100.0
Republican hold			

=== 1968 ===
1968 United States House of Representatives elections in California
Party	Candidate	Votes	%
Republican	Bob Wilson (Incumbent)	147,772	71.6
Democratic	Don Lindgren	58,578	28.4
Total votes		206,350	100.0
Republican hold			

=== 1970 ===
1970 United States House of Representatives elections in California
Party	Candidate	Votes	%
Republican	Bob Wilson (Incumbent)	132,446	71.5
Democratic	Daniel K. Hostetter	44,841	24.2
Peace and Freedom	Walter H. Koppelman	5,139	2.8
American Independent	Orville J. Davis	2,723	1.5
Total votes		185,149	100.0
Republican hold			

=== 1972 ===
1972 United States House of Representatives elections in California
Party	Candidate	Votes	%
Republican	William M. Ketchum	87,984	52.7
Democratic	Timothy Lemucchi	72,516	43.5
American Independent	William M. "Bill" Armour	6,307	3.8
Total votes		166,807	100.0
Republican hold			

=== 1974 ===
1974 United States House of Representatives elections in California
Party	Candidate	Votes	%
Democratic	George Brown Jr. (Incumbent)	69,615	62.6
Republican	Jim Osgood	35,858	32.3
American Independent	William E. Pasley	5,701	5.1
Total votes		111,174	100.0
Democratic hold			

=== 1976 ===
1976 United States House of Representatives elections in California
Party	Candidate	Votes	%
Democratic	George Brown Jr. (Incumbent)	90,830	61.5
Republican	Grant Carner	49,368	33.5
American Independent	William E. Pasley	7,358	5.0
Total votes		147,556	100.0
Democratic hold			

=== 1978 ===
1978 United States House of Representatives elections in California
Party	Candidate	Votes	%
Democratic	George Brown Jr. (Incumbent)	80,448	62.9
Republican	Dana Warren Carmody	47,417	37.1
Total votes		127,865	100.0
Democratic hold			

=== 1980 ===
1980 United States House of Representatives elections in California
Party	Candidate	Votes	%
Democratic	George Brown Jr. (Incumbent)	88,628	52.6
Republican	John Paul Stark	73,247	43.4
Libertarian	Harry J. Histen	6,815	4.0
Total votes		168,690	100.0
Democratic hold			

=== 1982 ===
1982 United States House of Representatives elections in California
Party	Candidate	Votes	%
Democratic	George Brown Jr. (Incumbent)	76,546	54.3
Republican	John Paul Stark	64,361	45.7
Total votes		140,907	100.0
Democratic hold			

=== 1984 ===
1984 United States House of Representatives elections in California
Party	Candidate	Votes	%
Democratic	George Brown Jr. (Incumbent)	104,438	56.6
Republican	John Paul Stark	80,212	43.4
Total votes		184,650	100.0
Democratic hold			

=== 1986 ===
1986 United States House of Representatives elections in California
Party	Candidate	Votes	%
Democratic	George Brown Jr. (Incumbent)	78,118	57.1
Republican	Robert L. "Bob" Henley	58,660	42.9
Total votes		136,778	100.0
Democratic hold			

=== 1988 ===
1988 United States House of Representatives elections in California
Party	Candidate	Votes	%
Democratic	George Brown Jr. (Incumbent)	103,493	54.0
Republican	John Paul Stark	81,413	42.4
Libertarian	Kenneth E. Valentine	3,382	1.8
American Independent	Fred L. Anderson	3,360	1.8
Total votes		191,648	100.0
Democratic hold			

=== 1990 ===
1990 United States House of Representatives elections in California
Party	Candidate	Votes	%
Democratic	George Brown Jr. (Incumbent)	72,409	52.7
Republican	Bob Hammock	64,961	47.3
Total votes		137,370	100.0
Democratic hold			

=== 1992 ===
1992 United States House of Representatives elections in California
Party	Candidate	Votes	%
Democratic	Jane Harman	125,751	48.4
Republican	Joan Milke Flores	109,684	42.3
Green	Richard Greene	13,297	5.1
Peace and Freedom	Owen Stanley	5,519	2.1
Libertarian	Marc F. Denny	5,504	2.1
Independent	Larry Martz (write-in)	2	0.0
Total votes		259,757	100.0
Democratic hold			

=== 1994 ===
1994 United States House of Representatives elections in California
Party	Candidate	Votes	%
Democratic	Jane Harman (Incumbent)	93,939	48.0
Republican	Susan Brooks	93,127	47.6
Libertarian	Jack Tyler	4,932	2.5
American Independent	Joseph J. "Joe" Fields	3,810	1.9
Total votes		195,808	100.0
Democratic hold			

=== 1996 ===
1996 United States House of Representatives elections in California
Party	Candidate	Votes	%
Democratic	Jane Harman (Incumbent)	117,752	52.5
Republican	Susan Brooks	98,538	44.0
Libertarian	Bruce Dovner	4,933	2.1
Natural Law	Bradley McManus	3,236	1.4
Total votes		224,459	100.0
Democratic hold			

=== 1998 ===
1998 United States House of Representatives elections in California
Party	Candidate	Votes	%
Republican	Steven T. Kuykendall	88,843	48.9
Democratic	Janice Hahn	84,624	46.6
Green	Robin Barrett	3,612	2.0
Libertarian	Kerry Welsh	3,066	1.7
Reform	John R. Konopka	1,561	0.8
Total votes		181,706	100.0
Republican gain from Democratic			

=== 2000 ===
2000 United States House of Representatives elections in California
Party	Candidate	Votes	%
Democratic	Jane Harman	115,651	48.4
Republican	Steven T. Kuykendall (Incumbent)	111,199	46.6
Libertarian	Daniel R. Sherman	6,073	2.6
Reform	John R. Konopka	3,549	1.4
Natural Law	Matt Ornati	2,264	0.9
Republican	William D. Davies (write-in)	395	0.1
Total votes		239,131	100%
Democratic gain from Republican			

=== 2002 ===
2002 United States House of Representatives elections in California
Party	Candidate	Votes	%
Democratic	Jane Harman (Incumbent)	88,198	61.4
Republican	Stuart Johnson	50,328	35.0
Libertarian	Mark McSpadden	5,225	3.6
Total votes		143,751	100.0
Democratic hold			

=== 2004 ===
2004 United States House of Representatives elections in California
Party	Candidate	Votes	%
Democratic	Jane Harman (Incumbent)	151,208	62.0
Republican	Paul Whitehead	81,666	33.5
Peace and Freedom	Alice Stek	6,105	2.5
Libertarian	Mike Binkley	5,065	2.0
Total votes		244,144	100.0
Democratic hold			

=== 2006 ===
2006 United States House of Representatives elections in California
Party	Candidate	Votes	%
Democratic	Jane Harman (Incumbent)	105,323	63.4
Republican	Brian Gibson	53,068	32.0
Peace and Freedom	James R. Smith	4,592	2.7
Libertarian	Mike Binkley	3,170	1.9
Total votes		166,153	100.0
Democratic hold			

=== 2008 ===
2008 United States House of Representatives elections in California
Party	Candidate	Votes	%
Democratic	Jane Harman (Incumbent)	171,948	68.7
Republican	Brian Gibson	78,543	31.3
Total votes		250,491	100.0
Democratic hold			

=== 2010 ===
2010 United States House of Representatives elections in California
Party	Candidate	Votes	%
Democratic	Jane Harman (Incumbent)	114,489	59.7
Republican	Mattie Fein	66,706	34.7
Libertarian	Herb Peters	10,840	5.6
Total votes		192,035	100.0
Democratic hold			

=== 2011 (Special) ===
2011 California's 36th congressional district special election
Party	Candidate	Votes	%
Democratic	Janice Hahn	47,000	54.9
Republican	Craig Huey	38,624	45.1
Total votes		85,624	100.0
Turnout			25.0
Democratic hold			

=== 2012 ===
2012 United States House of Representatives elections in California
Party	Candidate	Votes	%
Democratic	Raul Ruiz	110,189	52.9
Republican	Mary Bono (Incumbent)	97,953	47.1
Total votes		208,142	100.0
Democratic gain from Republican			

=== 2014 ===
2014 United States House of Representatives elections in California
Party	Candidate	Votes	%
Democratic	Raul Ruiz (Incumbent)	72,682	54.2
Republican	Brian Nestande	61,457	45.8
Total votes		134,139	100.0
Democratic hold			

=== 2016 ===
2016 United States House of Representatives elections in California
Party	Candidate	Votes	%
Democratic	Raul Ruiz (Incumbent)	144,348	62.1
Republican	Jeff Stone	88,269	37.9
Total votes		232,617	100.0
Democratic hold			

=== 2018 ===
2018 United States House of Representatives elections in California
Party	Candidate	Votes	%
Democratic	Raul Ruiz (Incumbent)	122,169	59.0
Republican	Kimberlin Brown Pelzer	84,839	41.0
Total votes		207,008	100.0
Democratic hold			

=== 2020 ===
2020 United States House of Representatives elections in California
Party	Candidate	Votes	%
Democratic	Raul Ruiz (Incumbent)	185,151	60.3
Republican	Erin Cruz	121,698	39.7
Total votes		306,849	100.0
Democratic hold			

=== 2022 ===
2022 United States House of Representatives elections in California
Party	Candidate	Votes	%
Democratic	Ted Lieu (Incumbent)	194,299	69.8
Republican	Joe Collins III	84,264	30.2
Total votes		278,563	100.0
Democratic hold			

=== 2024 ===
California's 36th congressional district, 2024
Primary election
Party	Candidate	Votes	%
Democratic	Ted Lieu (incumbent)	125,858	68.5
Republican	Melissa Toomim	27,440	14.9
Republican	Ariana Hakami	25,823	14.1
No party preference	Claire Anderson	4,509	2.5
Total votes		183,630	100.0
General election
Democratic	Ted Lieu (incumbent)	246,002	68.7
Republican	Melissa Toomim	111,985	31.3
Total votes		357,987	100.0
Democratic hold			

=== 2026 ===
California's 36th congressional district, 2026
Primary election
Party	Candidate	Votes	%
Democratic	Ted Lieu (incumbent)	142,982	60.9
Republican	Houston Brignano	35,851	15.3
Republican	Melissa Toomim	30,653	13.1
Democratic	Marianne Shamma	17,000	7.2
Democratic	Rustin Knudtson	3,001	1.3
Democratic	Frederick Reardon	2,688	1.1
Independent	Claire Ragge Anderson	2,470	1.1
Total votes		234,645	100.0
General election
Democratic	Ted Lieu (incumbent)		
Republican	Houston Brignano		
Total votes			

== Historical district boundaries ==
From 1993 to 2013, the 36th was located in southwestern Los Angeles County and included Manhattan Beach, Hermosa Beach, Torrance, Redondo Beach, and portions of Los Angeles itself. This district was largely dismantled after the 2010 census, and moved east to Riverside County and includes Palm Springs and La Quinta. The current 36th is largely the successor of the old 45th district.

== See also ==
- List of United States congressional districts
- California's congressional districts
