= 1974 United States House of Representatives elections in California =

- November 5, 1974

All 43 California seats to the United States House of Representatives
	Majority party	Minority party
Party	Democratic	Republican
Last election	23	20
Seats won	28	15
Seat change	▲5	▼5
Popular vote	3,265,513	2,334,870
Percentage	56.83%	40.63%
- Democratic gain Democratic hold Republican hold

The United States House of Representatives elections in California, 1974 were elections for California's delegation to the United States House of Representatives, which occurred as part of the general election of the House of Representatives on November 5, 1974. Democrats picked up five Republican-held districts.

== Overview ==
United States House of Representatives elections in California, 1974
Party	Votes	%	Before	After	+/–
Democratic	3,265,513	56.83%	23	28	+5
Republican	2,334,870	40.63%	20	15	-5
American Independent	109,751	1.91%	0	0	0
Peace and Freedom	35,984	0.63%	0	0	0
Totals	5,746,118	100.00%	43	43	—

== Results ==
Final results from the Clerk of the House of Representatives:

=== District 1 ===
California's 1st congressional district election, 1974
Party	Candidate	Votes	%
Democratic	Harold T. Johnson (incumbent)	137,849	85.90
American Independent	Dorothy D. Paradis	22,628	14.10
Total votes		160,477	100.00
Turnout			
Democratic hold			

=== District 2 ===
California's 2nd congressional district election, 1974
Party	Candidate	Votes	%
Republican	Don H. Clausen (incumbent)	95,508	53.01
Democratic	Oscar H. Klee	76,951	42.71
Peace and Freedom	Carole J. Glass	7,719	4.28
Total votes		180,178	100.00
Turnout			
Republican hold			

=== District 3 ===
California's 3rd congressional district election, 1974
Party	Candidate	Votes	%
Democratic	John E. Moss (incumbent)	121,842	72.34
Republican	Ivaldo Lenci	46,585	27.66
Total votes		168,427	100.00
Turnout			
Democratic hold			

=== District 4 ===
California's 4th congressional district election, 1974
Party	Candidate	Votes	%
Democratic	Robert L. Leggett (incumbent)	100,934	100.00
Turnout			
Democratic hold			

=== District 5 ===
California's 5th congressional district election, 1974
Party	Candidate	Votes	%
Democratic	John L. Burton (incumbent)	87,323	59.32
Republican	Thomas Caylor	55,881	37.96
Peace and Freedom	Raymond Broshears	3,999	2.72
Total votes		147,203	100.00
Turnout			
Democratic gain from Democratic			

Prior to the 1974 redistricting, the representative elected for this area (numbered the 6th district) was William S. Mailliard, a Republican, who resigned on March 5, 1974. John Burton (Democratic) was elected to finish his term, and was elected to a full term for the renumbered 5th district.

=== District 6 ===
California's 6th congressional district election, 1974
Party	Candidate	Votes	%
Democratic	Phillip Burton (incumbent)	84,585	71.37
Republican	Tom Spinosa	25,721	21.70
Peace and Freedom	Emily L. Siegel	4,753	4.01
American Independent	Carl Richard Davis	3,456	2.92
Total votes		118,515	100.00
Turnout			
Democratic hold			

=== District 7 ===
California's 7th congressional district election, 1974
Party	Candidate	Votes	%
Democratic	George Miller	82,765	55.59
Republican	Gary Fernandez	66,115	44.41
Total votes		148,880	100.00
Turnout			
Democratic hold			

=== District 8 ===
California's 8th congressional district election, 1974
Party	Candidate	Votes	%
Democratic	Ron Dellums (incumbent)	93,106	56.48
Republican	Jack Redden	65,432	39.69
American Independent	John Holland	6,324	3.84
Total votes		164,862	100.00
Turnout			
Democratic hold			

=== District 9 ===
California's 9th congressional district election, 1974
Party	Candidate	Votes	%
Democratic	Pete Stark (incumbent)	87,854	70.64
Republican	Edson Adams	36,522	29.36
Total votes		124,376	100.00
Turnout			
Democratic hold			

=== District 10 ===
California's 10th congressional district election, 1974
Party	Candidate	Votes	%
Democratic	Don Edwards (incumbent)	86,014	77.01
Republican	Herb Smith	25,678	22.99
Total votes		111,692	100.00
Turnout			
Democratic hold			

=== District 11 ===
California's 11th congressional district election, 1974
Party	Candidate	Votes	%
Democratic	Leo Ryan (incumbent)	106,075	75.69
Republican	Bob Jones	29,783	21.25
American Independent	Nicholas Waeil Kudrovzeff	4,293	3.06
Total votes		140,151	100.00
Turnout			
Democratic hold			

=== District 12 ===
California's 12th congressional district election, 1974
Party	Candidate	Votes	%
Republican	Pete McCloskey (incumbent)	103,228	69.08
Democratic	Gary G. Gillmor	46,197	30.92
Total votes		149,425	100.00
Turnout			
Republican hold			

=== District 13 ===
California's 13th congressional district election, 1974
Party	Candidate	Votes	%
Democratic	Norman Mineta	78,649	52.57
Republican	George W. Milias	63,381	42.36
Peace and Freedom	Elizabeth Cervantes Barron	3,846	2.57
American Independent	Floyd S. Stancliffe	3,738	2.50
Total votes		149,614	100.00
Turnout			
Democratic gain from Republican			

=== District 14 ===
California's 14th congressional district election, 1974
Party	Candidate	Votes	%
Democratic	John J. McFall (incumbent)	101,932	70.80
Republican	Charles M. "Chuck" Gibson	34,679	24.09
American Independent	Roger A. Blaine	7,367	5.12
Total votes		143,978	100.00
Turnout			
Democratic hold			

=== District 15 ===
California's 15th congressional district election, 1974
Party	Candidate	Votes	%
Democratic	Bernice F. Sisk (incumbent)	80,205	71.89
Republican	Carol Harner	31,361	28.11
Total votes		111,566	100.00
Turnout			
Democratic hold			

=== District 16 ===
California's 16th congressional district election, 1974
Party	Candidate	Votes	%
Republican	Burt L. Talcott (incumbent)	76,084	49.19
Democratic	Julian Camacho	74,018	47.85
American Independent	D. Jeff Mauro	4,576	2.96
Total votes		154,678	100.00
Turnout			
Republican hold			

=== District 17 ===
California's 17th congressional district election, 1974
Party	Candidate	Votes	%
Democratic	John Hans Krebs	66,082	51.90
Republican	Bob Mathias (incumbent)	61,242	48.10
Total votes		127,324	100.00
Turnout			
Democratic gain from Republican			

=== District 18 ===
California's 18th congressional district election, 1974
Party	Candidate	Votes	%
Republican	William M. Ketchum (incumbent)	66,603	52.64
Democratic	George A. Seielstad	59,931	47.36
Total votes		126,534	100.00
Turnout			
Republican hold			

=== District 19 ===
California's 19th congressional district election, 1974
Party	Candidate	Votes	%
Republican	Robert J. Lagomarsino (incumbent)	84,849	56.50
Democratic	James D. Loebl	65,334	43.50
Total votes		150,183	100.00
Turnout			
Republican hold			

=== District 20 ===
California's 20th congressional district election, 1974
Party	Candidate	Votes	%
Republican	Barry Goldwater, Jr. (incumbent)	96,324	61.18
Democratic	Arline M. Mathews	61,119	38.82
Total votes		157,443	100.00
Turnout			
Republican hold			

=== District 21 ===
California's 21st congressional district election, 1974
Party	Candidate	Votes	%
Democratic	James C. Corman (incumbent)	86,778	73.45
Republican	Mel Nadell	31,365	26.55
Total votes		118,143	100.00
Turnout			
Democratic hold			

=== District 22 ===
California's 22nd congressional district election, 1974
Party	Candidate	Votes	%
Republican	Carlos J. Moorhead (incumbent)	78,983	55.72
Democratic	Richard Hallin	62,770	44.28
Total votes		141,753	100.00
Turnout			
Republican hold			

=== District 23 ===
California's 23rd congressional district election, 1974
Party	Candidate	Votes	%
Democratic	Thomas M. Rees (incumbent)	119,239	71.46
Republican	Jack E. Roberts	47,615	28.54
Total votes		166,854	100.00
Turnout			
Democratic hold			

=== District 24 ===
California's 24th congressional district election, 1974
Party	Candidate	Votes	%
Democratic	Henry Waxman	85,343	64.17
Republican	Elliott Stone Graham	43,680	32.84
American Independent	David E. Daivs	3,980	2.99
Total votes		133,003	100.00
Turnout			
Democratic hold			

=== District 25 ===
California's 25th congressional district election, 1974
Party	Candidate	Votes	%
Democratic	Edward R. Roybal (incumbent)	43,998	100.00
Turnout			
Democratic hold			

=== District 26 ===
California's 26th congressional district election, 1974
Party	Candidate	Votes	%
Republican	John H. Rousselot (incumbent)	80,782	58.85
Democratic	Paul A. Conforti	56,487	41.15
Total votes		137,269	100.00
Turnout			
Republican hold			

=== District 27 ===
California's 27th congressional district election, 1974
Party	Candidate	Votes	%
Republican	Alphonzo E. Bell, Jr. (incumbent)	99,645	63.83
Democratic	John Dalessio	50,919	32.62
Peace and Freedom	Jerry Rubin	5,547	3.55
Total votes		156,111	100.00
Turnout			
Republican hold			

=== District 28 ===
California's 28th congressional district election, 1974
Party	Candidate	Votes	%
Democratic	Yvonne Brathwaite Burke (inc.)	86,743	80.28
Republican	Tom Neddy	21,308	19.72
Total votes		108,051	100.00
Turnout			
Democratic hold			

=== District 29 ===
California's 29th congressional district election, 1974
Party	Candidate	Votes	%
Democratic	Augustus F. Hawkins (incumbent)	45,977	100.00
Turnout			
Democratic hold			

=== District 30 ===
California's 30th congressional district election, 1974
Party	Candidate	Votes	%
Democratic	George E. Danielson (incumbent)	66,074	74.24
Republican	John J. Perez	22,928	25.76
Total votes		89,002	100.00
Turnout			
Democratic hold			

=== District 31 ===
California's 31st congressional district election, 1974
Party	Candidate	Votes	%
Democratic	Charles H. Wilson (incumbent)	60,560	70.46
Republican	Norman A. Hodges	23,039	26.81
Peace and Freedom	William C. Taylor	2,349	2.73
Total votes		85,948	100.00
Turnout			
Democratic hold			

=== District 32 ===
California's 32nd congressional district election, 1974
Party	Candidate	Votes	%
Democratic	Glenn M. Anderson (incumbent)	82,485	87.68
American Independent	Virgil V. Badalich	8,710	9.26
Peace and Freedom	Frank H. Walker	2,877	3.06
Total votes		94,072	100.00
Turnout			
Democratic hold			

=== District 33 ===
California's 33rd congressional district election, 1974
Party	Candidate	Votes	%
Republican	Del M. Clawson (incumbent)	71,054	53.38
Democratic	Robert E. "Bob" White	57,423	43.14
American Independent	James C. "Jim" Griffin	4,636	3.48
Total votes		133,113	100.00
Turnout			
Republican hold			

=== District 34 ===
California's 34th congressional district election, 1974
Party	Candidate	Votes	%
Democratic	Mark W. Hannaford (incumbent)	78,345	49.74
Republican	Bill Bond	72,967	46.32
American Independent	Bill Bond	3,169	2.01
Peace and Freedom	John S. Donohue	3,043	1.93
Total votes		157,524	100.00
Turnout			
Democratic hold			

=== District 35 ===
California's 35th congressional district election, 1974
Party	Candidate	Votes	%
Democratic	Jim Lloyd	60,709	50.25
Republican	Victor Veysey (incumbent)	60,102	49.75
Total votes		120,811	100.00
Turnout			
Democratic gain from Republican			

=== District 36 ===
California's 36th congressional district election, 1974
Party	Candidate	Votes	%
Democratic	George Brown, Jr. (incumbent)	69,615	62.62
Republican	Jim Osgood	35,858	32.25
American Independent	William E. Pasley	5,701	5.13
Total votes		111,174	100.00
Turnout			
Democratic hold			

=== District 37 ===
California's 37th congressional district election, 1974
Party	Candidate	Votes	%
Republican	Jerry Pettis (incumbent)	88,548	63.01
Democratic	Bobby Ray Vincent	46,449	33.06
American Independent	John H. Ortman	5,522	3.93
Total votes		140,519	100.00
Turnout			
Republican hold			

=== District 38 ===
California's 38th congressional district election, 1974
Party	Candidate	Votes	%
Democratic	Jerry M. Patterson	67,299	53.99
Republican	David Rehmann	51,509	41.32
American Independent	Lee R. Rayburn	3,991	3.20
Peace and Freedom	Larry B. Kallenberger	1,851	1.48
Total votes		124,650	100.00
Turnout			
Democratic gain from Republican			

=== District 39 ===
California's 39th congressional district election, 1974
Party	Candidate	Votes	%
Republican	Charles E. Wiggins (incumbent)	87,995	55.23
Democratic	William E. "Bill" Farris	64,735	40.63
American Independent	Pat P. Scalera	6,967	4.37
Total votes		159,337	100.00
Turnout			
Republican hold			

=== District 40 ===
California's 40th congressional district election, 1974
Party	Candidate	Votes	%
Republican	Andrew J. Hinshaw	114,895	63.31
Democratic	Roderick J. "Rod" Wilson	56,195	30.97
American Independent	Grayson L. Watkins	10,381	5.72
Total votes		181,471	100.00
Turnout			
Republican hold			

=== District 41 ===
California's 41st congressional district election, 1974
Party	Candidate	Votes	%
Republican	Bob Wilson (incumbent)	93,461	54.42
Democratic	Colleen Marie O'Connor	73,954	43.06
American Independent	Robert W. Franson	4,312	2.51
Total votes		171,727	100.00
Turnout			
Republican hold			

=== District 42 ===
California's 42nd congressional district election, 1974
Party	Candidate	Votes	%
Democratic	Lionel Van Deerlin (incumbent)	69,746	69.88
Republican	Wes Marden	30,058	30.12
Total votes		99,804	100.00
Turnout			
Democratic hold			

=== District 43 ===
California's 43rd congressional district election, 1974
Party	Candidate	Votes	%
Republican	Clair Burgener (incumbent)	114,102	60.37
Democratic	Bill Bandes	74,905	39.63
Total votes		189,007	100.00
Turnout			
Republican win (new seat)			

== See also ==
- 94th United States Congress
- Political party strength in California
- Political party strength in U.S. states
- 1974 United States House of Representatives elections
