= George Brown Jr. =

American politician (1920–1999)

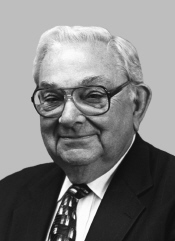

Chair of the House Science Committee
- In office January 3, 1991 – January 3, 1995
- Speaker: Tom Foley
- Preceded by: Robert A. Roe
- Succeeded by: Robert S. Walker

Member of the U.S. House of Representatives from California
- In office January 3, 1973 – July 15, 1999
- Preceded by: New district (redistricting)
- Succeeded by: Joe Baca
- Constituency: 38th district (1973–75); 36th district (1975–93); 42nd district (1993–99)
- In office January 3, 1963 – January 3, 1971
- Preceded by: New district (redistricting)
- Succeeded by: George E. Danielson
- Constituency: 29th district

Member of the California State Assembly from the 45th district
- In office January 5, 1959 – January 3, 1963
- Preceded by: Don Anderson
- Succeeded by: Alfred H. Song

Personal details
- Born: George Edward Brown Jr. March 6, 1920 Holtville, California, U.S.
- Died: July 15, 1999 (aged 79) Bethesda, Maryland, U.S.
- Party: Democratic
- Education: University of California, Los Angeles

Military service
- Allegiance: United States
- Branch/service: United States Army
- Years of service: 1944-1946
- Rank: First Lieutenant
- Battles/wars: World War II
- Brown's voice Brown, as chair of the House Science Committee, speaks on funding for the National Science Foundation; Recorded May 4, 1994

George Edward Brown Jr. (March 6, 1920 – July 15, 1999) was an American Democratic politician from California. He represented suburban portions of Los Angeles County in the United States House of Representatives from 1963 to 1971 and parts of the Inland Empire region from 1973 until his death in 1999. He briefly left office after unsuccessfully running for the United States Senate in 1970.

== Early life ==
Brown was born in Holtville, California, and was one of four children of George Edward Brown and Bird Alma Kilgore. Brown graduated from Holtville Union High School in 1935 and attended Central Junior College (now Imperial Valley College) in 1938. He then entered the University of California, Los Angeles (UCLA), where he became head of the UCLA Student Housing Association and helped found the University Cooperative Housing Association (UCHA), a student housing cooperative, in 1938. The UCHA was formed in part to allow African American students to live off campus in the Westwood section of Los Angeles, which then did not allow them in the neighborhood. To emphasize the point, Brown took an African American roommate in the first interracial housing arrangement at UCLA. The experience was also the first example of Brown's lifelong association with cooperatives.

Shortly after the Japanese attack at Pearl Harbor, Japanese Americans were sent to internment camps, an action that offended Brown so much that he helped organize protests in Los Angeles in 1942. Brown's college education was interrupted by the draft, but as a Quaker, he had registered as a conscientious objector, and in 1942, he entered the Civilian Public Service at Camp 21 in Wyeth, Oregon. During his service at Camp 21, Brown realized that he could not change the broader society while he was isolated in Civilian Public Service and rescinded his conscientious objector status in 1944, entering the United States Army, serving in World War II as an instructor and rising to the rank of lieutenant by the time of his discharge in 1946.

Once the war ended, he returned to college, finishing his education at UCLA, where he graduated with a BS degree in Industrial Physics in 1946.

== Career ==
For 12 years, he was employed by the city of Los Angeles in the Department of Water and Power in engineering and personnel. In 1958, he became a management consultant.

Brown continued his political activism by invigorating the Monterey Park Democratic Club.

In 1954, Brown was elected as a member of the city council of Monterey Park, and served until 1958. In 1956, Brown became the mayor of Monterey Park, California, until 1958.

Brown's activism on behalf of civil rights continued during his term as mayor, as was evidenced by a report that when the first African American family moved to Monterey Park and met with racist protests, Brown drove to the family's home, where he spent the night to protect them.

He was a member of the California State Assembly from 1959 to 1963. His service in the state legislature was marked by a number of innovative legislative proposals. The George Brown Act of 1961 was one of the first comprehensive public employee labor relations laws in the nation. Other legislative proposals included some of the first bills to ban lead in gasoline, ban the use of the pesticide DDT, and even a whimsical proposal to ban the internal combustion engine.

In 1962, Brown won the election and became a member of the United States House of Representatives, where he served from 1963 to 1970.

== Early Congressional service ==
Brown's Congressional service coincided with the early phases of the Vietnam War. Brown was a strong opponent of the expansion of the conflict and joined a Quaker protest on the steps of the Capitol in 1965, daring police to arrest him with the other anti-war protestors. He was a lone and steady voice and vote against the war. The Fiscal Year 1966 Department of Defense Appropriations Bill passed the House of Representatives 392–1, with Brown the sole dissenting vote. On February 26, 1966, the Foreign Aid Bill, with its provisions of support for the South Vietnamese government, passed the House 350–27, with Brown the only liberal voting "No" (the other 26 votes were conservatives opposed to foreign aid). In March 1966, the fiscal year 1966 Supplemental Appropriations Bill with funding for Vietnam passed the House 393–4, with Brown joined by Representatives Burton, Conyers, and Ryan. In August 1967, Brown was once again the sole dissenting voice against the fiscal year 1968 Defense Appropriations bill, which passed the House 407–1.

Brown was involved in other major national policy changes, notably the passage of the Civil Rights Act. Brown was a strong and early advocate of the legislation and was present at the signing of the bill. Brown also actively supported the farmworker organizing of Cesar Chavez and the mid-1960s grape boycott.

== 1970 California Senate Democratic Primary ==
In 1970, Republican Senator George Murphy was considered vulnerable and was a top target of the Democratic Party. Representative John V. Tunney entered the race early and painted himself as a young, charismatic and energetic "Kennedy-esque" candidate, as opposed to the older, established Murphy. However, Brown also entered the race in 1969 though with little money, organization, or, most felt, chance to win. What ensued was one of the most bitter primary elections in California history. Brown touted his long standing opposition to U.S. involvement in Vietnam, and while Tunney also stated he opposed the war, he favored keeping the draft while Brown opposed it. Brown's mentor was Eugene McCarthy and like McCarthy in 1968, he ran a grass roots campaign. While Tunney stayed in the center-right of the political spectrum, Brown ran unabashedly to the left. Suddenly young voters flocked to the older Brown, and what seemed like an easy nomination for Tunney turned into a dogfight. The invasion of Cambodia and the Kent State killings also helped Brown. Brown made Vietnam and Richard Nixon the focus of his campaign while Tunney toed a middle ground. As Brown edged ahead in the polls, the campaign turned nasty. Tunney falsely claimed that Brown advocated campus violence and was a liberal rogue who could not be trusted in the Senate. The normally-laidback Brown then lashed out at Tunney, calling him a spoiled little rich kid. Tunney then touted his anti-war record, which Brown said was merely political grandstanding. Tunney used a late spending spree on television ads and after a hard-fought nasty campaign, Brown narrowly lost the primary. After the bitter primary, Tunney trailed Murphy in the polls by double digits but quickly made up ground and defeated Murphy handily in the general election.

== Return to Congress ==
Following his defeat by Tunney in the California Senate race, Brown was awarded a Ford Foundation Fellowship and studied for a time with Ivan Illich at his Intercultural Documentation Center at Cuernavaca in Mexico.

The 1970 reapportionment added five new districts to California, and in 1972, Brown sought election to the redistricted 38th congressional district and won. He was elected to the Ninety-third and to the 13 succeeding Congresses (January 3, 1973 – July 15, 1999).

Being a progressive Democrat from a largely-conservative area, Brown was famous for running in more close elections than any other representatives in the 20th century without being defeated. (A close election is considered by most pundits to be 55% of the vote or less, as most incumbent members of Congress easily top 60% in their races.) Brown topped the 55% mark only eight times in his 18 congressional elections and 60% only three times. He was nearly defeated in numerous elections starting with his first in 1962 for congressional district 29 with 55.7% of the vote. He would then earn 58.6%, 51.1%, and 52.3% in 1964, 1966, and 1968 respectively before he ran for the US Senate. In 1972, he returned to Congress by winning 56% of the vote in the Thirty-eighth district, based in San Bernardino. He would then have his three easiest campaigns by winning 62.6% in 1974, 61.6% in 1976, and 62.9% in 1978. In 1980, the Ronald Reagan landslide almost forced him from office, and he struggled to hold on with 52.5% against Republican John Paul Stark. It was the first of four consecutive elections against Stark, another modern-era record. Brown would triumph with 54% in 1982 and would garner 56.6% in 1984, 57% in 1986, and 54% in 1988. In 1990 he slipped to a meager 52.7% against San Bernardino County Supervisor Rob Hammock, a sign of tough elections to come. In 1992, the famed pilot Dick Rutan held him to 50.7%. The 1996 race was even closer, as he barely defeated San Bernardino County Superior Court Judge Linda Wilde with 50.5%, winning by a plurality of only 996 votes. In his final re-election campaign in 1998, he came up with 55% of the vote.

In the 102nd and the 103rd Congresses, he served as chairman of the Committee on Science, Space and Technology, which is now the House Committee on Science.

Brown died on July 15, 1999, at the age of 79 in Bethesda, Maryland, from an infection developed following heart valve replacement surgery in May of that year while he was serving his 18th term in the House. The heart valve was damaged by scarlet fever in his youth. At the time of his death, Brown was the ranking Democratic member on the House Science Committee and a senior member of the House Agriculture Committee. He was the oldest serving House member and the longest-serving member of the House or Senate in the history of his home state of California. The Democrat Joe Baca was elected to his seat in a special election.

== Legislative record ==
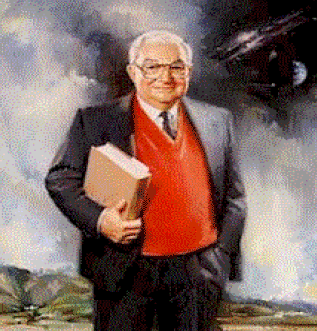
A portrait of George Brown Jr. standing on the surface of the Moon.

Brown was known as a champion for science. He left behind a deep and expansive legacy that has shaped science and science policy in America. Among some of his many accomplishments during his service on the House Science Committee:

- Convened the first congressional hearings on Climate Change(May 18–27, 1976)
- Established the first federal climate change research program in the National Climate Program Act of 1978
- Established the Office of Science and Technology Policy
- Established the Environmental Protection Agency
- Established the (now defunct) Office of Technology Assessment

Consistent with his long-held conviction that the nation needed a coherent technology policy, Brown developed an extensive technology initiative during his term as Chairman of the House Science and Technology Committee (1991–1995). This work articulated his concept of a partnership between the public and private sectors to improve the nation's competitiveness. Such successes and his continuing concern to demonstrate the practical application of advances in science and technology, he instituted the first video conferences in the U.S. Congress between the US and the Soviet Union/Russia, between 1987 and 1990. During these live teleconferences, Members of the House Science and Technology Committee exchanged ideas on science and technology via satellite with counterparts from the Commonwealth of Independent States. This series of broadcasts, hosted by Peter Jennings, won an Emmy for technical achievement.

Brown was critical of government secrecy over-reach and sought and gained a seat on the House Intelligence Committee. He pressed for a relaxation of secrecy restrictions on remote sensing satellites, seeing a great potential commercial market in remote sensing. His work eventually brought him into conflict with the intelligence community and he eventually resigned from the committee in protest.

He also was a staunch defender of civil liberties and human rights. In 1992, for example, he led a 60 Minutes investigative team to Central America to expose the use of U.S. taxpayer dollars for the construction of export processing zones in which workers were being grossly mistreated and denied their fundamental human rights as they made apparel and other consumer products exported back to the U.S. His investigation and expose surfaced in the 1992 presidential election campaign and also resulted in the Congress immediately cutting off the use of any taxpayer funds for the development of such export zones (EPZs) anywhere outside of the U.S.

== Personal life ==
Brown's wife was Marta Macias. They had two children.

Brown's previous wife was Rowena Ruth Brown, who died in 1987.

In the 1950s, Brown lived in Monterey Park, California.

On July 15, 1999, Brown died of an infection following heart valve replacement surgery, at Bethesda Naval Hospital in Bethesda, Maryland.

== Legacy ==
Because of his commitment to science, Brown was honored by several science and policy related organizations and had laboratories, awards, libraries and bills named in his honor, including:

- George E. Brown Salinity Laboratory
- George E. Brown Jr. Library, National Academies of Science
- George E. Brown Jr. Network for Earthquake Engineering Simulation (NEES)
- H.R. 1022: George E. Brown Jr. Near-Earth Object Survey Act (which was rolled into S.1281, the NASA Authorization Act of 2005, and is now law
- George Brown Award for International Scientific Cooperation CRDF Global

Brown's archive of papers was donated to the University of California, Riverside.

The George E. Brown, Jr. Federal Building and United States Courthouse, housing the United States District Court for the Central District of California, Eastern Division, in Riverside, is named in his honor.

== Electoral history ==
George Brown electoral history

1962 United States House of Representatives elections in California
Party	Candidate	Votes	%
Democratic	George Brown, Jr.	73,740	55.7
Republican	H. L. Richardson, Jr.	58,760	44.3
Total votes		132,500	100.0
Democratic hold			

1964 United States House of Representatives elections in California
Party	Candidate	Votes	%
Democratic	George Brown, Jr. (Incumbent)	90,208	58.6
Republican	Charles J. Farrington, Jr.	63,836	41.4
Total votes		154,044	100.0
Democratic hold			

1966 United States House of Representatives elections in California
Party	Candidate	Votes	%
Democratic	George Brown, Jr. (Incumbent)	69,115	51.1
Republican	Bill Orozco	66,079	48.9
Total votes		135,194	100.0
Democratic hold			

1968 United States House of Representatives elections in California
Party	Candidate	Votes	%
Democratic	George Brown, Jr. (Incumbent)	74,807	52.3
Republican	Bill Orozco	68,213	47.7
Total votes		143,020	100.0
Democratic hold			

1970 Democratic U.S. Senate primary results, California
Party	Candidate	Votes	%
Democratic	John V. Tunney	1,010,812	41.58%
Democratic	George Brown Jr.	812,463	33.42%
Democratic	Kenneth Hahn	417,970	17.19%
Democratic	Eileen Anderson	60,977	2.51%
Democratic	Arthur Bell Jr.	48,878	2.01%
Democratic	Leonard Kurland	43,923	1.81%
Democratic	Louis Di Salvo	35,829	1.47%
Total votes		2,430,852	100.00

1972 United States House of Representatives elections in California
Party	Candidate	Votes	%
Democratic	George Brown, Jr.	77,776	56.3
Republican	Howard J. Snider	60,379	43.7
Total votes		138,155	100.0
Democratic hold			

1974 United States House of Representatives elections in California
Party	Candidate	Votes	%
Democratic	George Brown Jr. (Incumbent)	69,615	62.6
Republican	Jim Osgood	35,858	32.3
American Independent	William E. Pasley	5,701	5.1
Total votes		111,174	100.0
Democratic hold			

1976 United States House of Representatives elections in California
Party	Candidate	Votes	%
Democratic	George Brown Jr. (Incumbent)	90,830	61.5
Republican	Grant Carner	49,368	33.5
American Independent	William E. Pasley	7,358	5.0
Total votes		147,556	100.0
Democratic hold			

1978 United States House of Representatives elections in California
Party	Candidate	Votes	%
Democratic	George Brown Jr. (Incumbent)	80,448	62.9
Republican	Dana Warren Carmody	47,417	37.1
Total votes		127,865	100.0
Democratic hold			

1980 United States House of Representatives elections in California
Party	Candidate	Votes	%
Democratic	George Brown Jr. (Incumbent)	88,628	52.6
Republican	John Paul Stark	73,247	43.4
Libertarian	Harry J. Histen	6,815	4.0
Total votes		168,690	100.0
Democratic hold			

1982 United States House of Representatives elections in California
Party	Candidate	Votes	%
Democratic	George Brown Jr. (Incumbent)	76,546	54.3
Republican	John Paul Stark	64,361	45.7
Total votes		140,907	100.0
Democratic hold			

1984 United States House of Representatives elections in California
Party	Candidate	Votes	%
Democratic	George Brown Jr. (Incumbent)	104,438	56.6
Republican	John Paul Stark	80,212	43.4
Total votes		184,650	100.0
Democratic hold			

1986 United States House of Representatives elections in California
Party	Candidate	Votes	%
Democratic	George Brown Jr. (Incumbent)	78,118	57.1
Republican	Robert L. "Bob" Henley	58,660	42.9
Total votes		136,778	100.0
Democratic hold			

1988 United States House of Representatives elections in California
Party	Candidate	Votes	%
Democratic	George Brown Jr. (Incumbent)	103,493	54.0
Republican	John Paul Stark	81,413	42.4
Libertarian	Kenneth E. Valentine	3,382	1.8
American Independent	Fred L. Anderson	3,360	1.8
Total votes		191,648	100.0
Democratic hold			

1990 United States House of Representatives elections in California
Party	Candidate	Votes	%
Democratic	George Brown Jr. (Incumbent)	72,409	52.7
Republican	Bob Hammock	64,961	47.3
Total votes		137,370	100.0
Democratic hold			

1992 United States House of Representatives elections in California
Party	Candidate	Votes	%
Democratic	George Brown, Jr. (Incumbent)	79,780	50.7
Republican	Dick Rutan	69,251	44.0
Libertarian	Fritz R. Ward	8,424	5.3
Total votes		157,455	100.0
Democratic hold			

1994 United States House of Representatives elections in California
Party	Candidate	Votes	%
Democratic	George Brown, Jr. (Incumbent)	58,888	51.1
Republican	Rob Guzman	56,259	48.9
Independent	LaBine (write-in)	44	0.0
Independent	Sanchez (write-in)	14	0.0
Total votes		115,205	100.0
Democratic hold			

1996 United States House of Representatives elections in California
Party	Candidate	Votes	%
Democratic	George Brown, Jr. (Incumbent)	52,166	50.5
Republican	Linda Wilde	51,170	49.5
Total votes		103,336	100.0
Democratic hold			

1998 United States House of Representatives elections in California
Party	Candidate	Votes	%
Democratic	George Brown, Jr. (Incumbent)	62,207	55.3
Republican	Elia Pirozzi	45,328	40.3
American Independent	Hale McGee	3,086	2.7
Libertarian	David Lynn Hollist	1,899	1.7
Total votes		112,520	100.0
Democratic hold			

== See also ==
- List of members of the United States Congress who died in office (1950–1999)

U.S. House of Representatives
Preceded by Dalip Singh Saund	Member of the U.S. House of Representatives from California's 29th congressional district January 3, 1963 – January 3, 1971	Succeeded by George E. Danielson
Preceded by Victor V. Veysey	Member of the U.S. House of Representatives from California's 38th congressional district January 3, 1973 – January 3, 1975	Succeeded by Jerry M. Patterson
Preceded by William M. Ketchum	Member of the U.S. House of Representatives from California's 36th congressional district January 3, 1975 – January 3, 1993	Succeeded by Jane Harman
Preceded by Dana Rohrabacher	Member of the U.S. House of Representatives from California's 42nd congressional district January 3, 1993 – July 15, 1999	Succeeded by Joe Baca
Political offices
Preceded by Robert A. Roe; New Jersey	Chairman of House Science Committee; 1991–1995	Succeeded by Robert S. Walker; Pennsylvania
