= George E. Danielson =

American politician & judge (1915–1998)

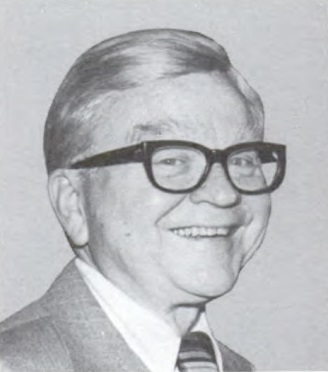

Member of the U.S. House of Representatives from California
- In office January 3, 1971 – March 9, 1982
- Preceded by: George Brown Jr.
- Succeeded by: Matthew G. Martínez
- Constituency: 29th district (1971–75); 30th district (1975–82)

Member of the California State Senate from the 27th district
- In office January 2, 1967 – January 12, 1971
- Preceded by: Robert D. Williams
- Succeeded by: David Roberti

Member of the California State Assembly from the 48th district
- In office January 7, 1963 – January 2, 1967
- Preceded by: Frank D. Lanterman
- Succeeded by: David Roberti

Personal details
- Born: George Elmore Danielson; February 20, 1915 Wausa, Nebraska
- Died: September 12, 1998 (aged 83) Monterey Park, California
- Party: Democratic
- Spouse: Gladys C. "Candy" Danielson
- Profession: Lawyer

George Elmore Danielson (February 20, 1915 – September 12, 1998) was an American Democratic politician and judge from California. He served in the United States House of Representatives from 1971 to 1982.

== Early life and career ==
Born in Wausa, Nebraska, Danielson attended Wayne State Teachers College before earning his B.A. and J.D. from the University of Nebraska–Lincoln in 1937 and 1939, respectively. He was a special agent with the Federal Bureau of Investigation from 1939 to 1944 and served in the United States Navy Reserve from 1944 to 1946.

He was an Assistant United States Attorney from 1949 to 1951 and thereafter entered private practice.

== Political career ==
Danielson was twice elected to the California State Assembly, serving from 1963 to 1967, and to the California State Senate, serving from 1967 to 1971.

=== Congress ===
In 1970, he was elected to his first of six terms to the U.S. House of Representatives. He served on the House Judiciary Committee during the impeachment proceedings against President Richard Nixon and voted in favor of three of the articles.

Danielson resigned from Congress on March 9, 1982, after being appointed an associate justice on the California Court of Appeal in the Second District, Division Three by Governor Jerry Brown.

== Retirement and death ==
Danielson retired from the bench in April 1992.

He died on September 12, 1998, of heart failure in Monterey Park, California.

== Electoral history ==
1970 United States House of Representatives elections in California
Party	Candidate	Votes	%
Democratic	George E. Danielson	71,308	62.6
Republican	Tom McMann	42,620	37.4
Total votes		113,928	100.0
Democratic hold			

1972 United States House of Representatives elections in California
Party	Candidate	Votes	%
Democratic	George E. Danielson (Incumbent)	91,553	62.8
Republican	Richard E. Ferraro	48,814	33.5
Peace and Freedom	John W. Blaine	5,455	3.7
Total votes		145,822	100.0
Democratic hold			

1974 United States House of Representatives elections in California
Party	Candidate	Votes	%
Democratic	George E. Danielson (Incumbent)	66,074	74.2
Republican	John J. Perez	22,928	25.8
Total votes		89,002	100.0
Democratic hold			

1976 United States House of Representatives elections in California
Party	Candidate	Votes	%
Democratic	George E. Danielson (Incumbent)	82,767	74.4
Republican	Harry Couch	28,503	25.6
Total votes		111,270	100.0
Democratic hold			

1978 United States House of Representatives elections in California
Party	Candidate	Votes	%
Democratic	George E. Danielson (Incumbent)	66,241	71.4
Republican	Henry Ares	26,511	28.6
Total votes		92,752	100.0
Democratic hold			

1980 United States House of Representatives elections in California
Party	Candidate	Votes	%
Democratic	George E. Danielson (Incumbent)	74,119	72.1
Republican	J. Arthur "Art" Platten	24,136	23.5
Libertarian	Bruce M. Hobbs	4,480	4.4
Total votes		102,735	100.0
Democratic hold			

== See also ==
U.S. House of Representatives
Preceded by George Brown Jr.	Member of the U.S. House of Representatives from California's 29th congressional district 1971–1975	Succeeded by Augustus Hawkins
Preceded by Edward R. Roybal	Member of the U.S. House of Representatives from California's 30th congressional district 1975–1982	Succeeded by Matthew G. Martínez
