= California's 38th congressional district =

U.S. House district for California

Coordinates: 33°56′26″N 118°03′45″W

- Interactive map of district boundaries
- Representative: Linda Sánchez; D–Whittier
- Population (2025): 733,860
- Median household income: $108,501
- Ethnicity: 61.1% Hispanic; 21.0% Asian; 13.5% White; 1.8% Black; 1.7% Two or more races; 0.8% other
- Cook PVI: D+10

California's 38th congressional district is a congressional district in the U.S. state of California based in suburban eastern Los Angeles County and Orange County, California. The district is currently represented by Democrat Linda Sánchez.

The district covers several cities in the San Gabriel Valley and the Gateway Cities region of Los Angeles including the cities of: Diamond Bar, Industry, La Habra Heights, La Mirada, Montebello, Norwalk, Pico Rivera, Santa Fe Springs, Walnut, and Whittier.

As well the unincorporated communities of: Rowland Heights, Hacienda Heights, Los Nietos, East Whittier, North Whittier, and South Whittier.

A small portion of Pomona and the Orange County city of La Habra are also included in the district.

Most of the cities have a Hispanic majority, primarily Mexican, while Diamond Bar, Hacienda Heights, Industry, Rowland Heights and Walnut have an Asian-American majority, primarily Chinese. La Mirada also has a significant Korean American community.

== Recent election results from statewide races ==
=== 2023–2027 boundaries ===
Year	Office	Results
2008	President	Obama 62% - 38%
2010	Governor	Brown 56% - 39%
2010	Lt. Governor	Newsom 50% - 37%
2010	Secretary of State	Bowen 54% - 36%
2010	Attorney General	Cooley 46% - 45%
2010	Treasurer	Lockyer 59% - 34%
2010	Controller	Chiang 55% - 35%
2012	President	Obama 64% - 36%
2014	Governor	Brown 58% - 42%
2016	President	Clinton 65% - 29%
2018	Governor	Newsom 63% - 37%
2018	Attorney General	Becerra 66% - 34%
2020	President	Biden 64% - 34%
2022	Senate (Reg.)	Padilla 60% - 40%
2022	Governor	Newsom 58% - 42%
2022	Lt. Governor	Kounalakis 58% - 42%
2022	Secretary of State	Weber 58% - 42%
2022	Attorney General	Bonta 57% - 43%
2022	Treasurer	Ma 57% - 43%
2022	Controller	Cohen 54% - 46%
2024	President	Harris 56% - 40%
2024	Senate (Reg.)	Schiff 57% - 43%

=== 2027–2033 boundaries ===
Year	Office	Results
2008	President	Obama 62% - 38%
2010	Governor	Brown 56% - 39%
2010	Lt. Governor	Newsom 50% - 37%
2010	Secretary of State	Bowen 54% - 36%
2010	Attorney General	Harris 46% - 45%
2010	Treasurer	Lockyer 59% - 34%
2010	Controller	Chiang 55% - 35%
2012	President	Obama 64% - 36%
2014	Governor	Brown 58% - 42%
2016	President	Clinton 65% - 29%
2018	Governor	Newsom 63% - 37%
2018	Attorney General	Becerra 66% - 34%
2020	President	Biden 64% - 34%
2022	Senate (Reg.)	Padilla 60% - 40%
2022	Governor	Newsom 58% - 42%
2022	Lt. Governor	Kounalakis 58% - 42%
2022	Secretary of State	Weber 58% - 42%
2022	Attorney General	Bonta 57% - 43%
2022	Treasurer	Ma 57% - 43%
2022	Controller	Cohen 54% - 46%
2024	President	Harris 56% - 40%
2024	Senate (Reg.)	Schiff 57% - 43%

== Composition ==
FIPS County Code	County	Seat	Population
37	Los Angeles	Los Angeles	9,663,345
59	Orange	Santa Ana	3,135,755

Under the 2020 redistricting, California's 38th congressional district is located in Southern California, taking up part of Southeast Los Angeles County and the city of La Habra in Orange County. The area in Los Angeles County includes part of the cities of Downey and Pomona; part of the census-designated place Avocado Heights; the cities of Whittier, Montebello, Norwalk, Pico Rivera, Diamond Bar, La Mirada, Walnut, Santa Fe Springs, La Habra Heights, and Industry; and the census-designated places Hacienda Heights, East Whittier, South Whittier, West Whittier-Los Nietos, Rose Hills, and Rowland Heights.

Los Angeles County is split between this district, the 28th district, the 31st district, the 35th district, the 35th district, the 42nd district, and the 45th district. The 38th, 28th, 31st, and 35th are partitioned by E Pomona Blvd, Potrero Grande Dr, Arroyo Dr, Hill Dr, Montebello Blvd, N San Gabriel Blvd, Walnut Grove Ave, Whittier Narrows Recreation Area, N Lexington-Gallatin Rd, N Durfree Ave, E Thienes Ave, E Rush St, N Burkett Rd, Cunningham Dr, Eaglemont Dr, Oakman Dr, Arciero Dr, Grossmont Dr, Workman Mill Rd, Bunbury Dr, Fontenoy Ave, Ankerton, Whittier Woods Circle, Union Pacific Railroad, San Gabriel Freeway, N Peck Rd, Mission Mill Rd, Rose Hills Rd, Wildwood Dr, Clark Ave, San Jose Creek, Turnbull Canyon Rd, E Gale Ave, Pomona Freeway, Colima Rd, E Walnut Dr N, Nogales St, E Walnut Dr S, Fairway Dr, E Valley Blvd, Calle Baja, La Puente Rd, S Sentous Ave, N Nogales St, Amar Rd, Walnut City Parkland, San Bernardino Freeway, Fairplex Dr, Via Verde, Puddingstone Reservoir, McKinley Ave, N Whittle Ave, Arrow Highway, Fulton Rd, and Foothill Blvd.

The 38th, 34th and 42nd are partitioned by Simmons Ave, W Beverly Blvd, Via Corona St, Repetto Ave, Allston St, W Northside Dr, Yates Ave, E Acco St, 6866 E Washington Blvd-2808 Vail Ave, S 14th St, AT & SF Railway, Church Rd, Telegraph Rd, Rio Hondo River, Veterans Memorial Park, Suva St, Guatemala Ave, Shady Oak Dr, Coolgrove Dr, Gallatin Rd, Samoline Ave, Paramount Blvd, Arrington Ave, Suva St, Charloma Dr, Lubet St, Highway 5, and the San Gabriel River.

=== Cities and CDPs with 10,000 or more people ===
- Pomona – 151,713
- Downey – 114,355
- Norwalk – 102,773
- Whittier – 87,306
- La Habra – 63,097
- Pico Rivera – 62,088
- La Habra – 60,513
- Montebello – 60,569
- South Whittier – 56,415
- Diamond Bar – 55,072
- Hacienda Heights – 54,191
- Rowland Heights – 48,231
- La Mirada – 48,008
- Walnut – 28,430
- West Whittier-Los Nietos – 25,325
- Santa Fe Springs – 19,219
- East Whittier – 10,394

=== 2,500 – 10,000 people ===
- La Habra Heights – 5,682
- Rose Hills – 2,927

== Future composition ==
Beginning with the 2026 election, the 38th district will consist of the following counties:

- Los Angeles (part)
- Orange (part)

== List of members representing the district ==
Member	Party	Dates	Cong– ress	Electoral history	Counties
District created January 3, 1963
Patrick M. Martin (Riverside)	Republican	January 3, 1963 – January 3, 1965	88th	Elected in 1962. Lost re-election.	1963–1969; Imperial County; Riverside County
John V. Tunney (Riverside)	Democratic	January 3, 1965 – January 2, 1971	89th 90th 91st	Elected in 1964. Re-elected in 1966. Re-elected in 1968. Resigned to become a U.S. senator.	1963–1969; Imperial County; Riverside County
John V. Tunney (Riverside)	Democratic	January 3, 1965 – January 2, 1971	89th 90th 91st	Elected in 1964. Re-elected in 1966. Re-elected in 1968. Resigned to become a U.S. senator.	1969–1973; Imperial County; Riverside County
Vacant		January 2, 1971 – January 3, 1971	91st		1969–1973; Imperial County; Riverside County
Victor Veysey (Brawley)	Republican	January 3, 1971 – January 3, 1973	92nd	Elected in 1970. Redistricted to the 43rd district.	1969–1973; Imperial County; Riverside County
George Brown Jr. (Colton)	Democratic	January 3, 1973 – January 3, 1975	93rd	Elected in 1972. Redistricted to the 36th district.	1973–1975; San Bernardino County (Inland Empire)
Jerry M. Patterson (Santa Ana)	Democratic	January 3, 1975 – January 3, 1985	94th 95th 96th 97th 98th	Elected in 1974. Re-elected in 1976. Re-elected in 1978. Re-elected in 1980. Re-elected in 1982. Lost re-election.	1975–1983; North Central Orange County (Anaheim)
Jerry M. Patterson (Santa Ana)	Democratic	January 3, 1975 – January 3, 1985	94th 95th 96th 97th 98th	Elected in 1974. Re-elected in 1976. Re-elected in 1978. Re-elected in 1980. Re-elected in 1982. Lost re-election.	1983–1993; Northwest Orange County (Garden Grove; Santa Ana)
Bob Dornan (Garden Grove)	Republican	January 3, 1985 – January 3, 1993	99th 100th 101st 102nd	Elected in 1984. Re-elected in 1986. Re-elected in 1988. Re-elected in 1990. Redistricted to the 46th district.	1983–1993; Northwest Orange County (Garden Grove; Santa Ana)
Steve Horn (Long Beach)	Republican	January 3, 1993 – January 3, 2003	103rd 104th 105th 106th 107th	Elected in 1992. Re-elected in 1994. Re-elected in 1996. Re-elected in 1998. Re-elected in 2000. Retired.	1993–2003; Los Angeles County (Bellflower; Long Beach)
Grace Napolitano (Norwalk)	Democratic	January 3, 2003 – January 3, 2013	108th 109th 110th 111th 112th	Redistricted from the 34th district and re-elected in 2002. Re-elected in 2004. Re-elected in 2006. Re-elected in 2008. Re-elected in 2010. Redistricted to the 32nd district.	2003–2013 San Gabriel Valley, Los Angeles County (East L.A., Norwalk, Pomona, La Puente, Hacienda Heights)
Linda Sánchez (Whittier)	Democratic	January 3, 2013 – present	113th 114th 115th 116th 117th 118th 119th	Redistricted from the 39th district and re-elected in 2012. Re-elected in 2014. Re-elected in 2016. Re-elected in 2018. Re-elected in 2020. Re-elected in 2022. Re-elected in 2024. Redistricted to the 41st district.	2013–2023 Los Angeles County; Orange County (Norwalk, Whittier, La Palma)
Linda Sánchez (Whittier)	Democratic	January 3, 2013 – present	113th 114th 115th 116th 117th 118th 119th	Redistricted from the 39th district and re-elected in 2012. Re-elected in 2014. Re-elected in 2016. Re-elected in 2018. Re-elected in 2020. Re-elected in 2022. Re-elected in 2024. Redistricted to the 41st district.	2023–present Los Angeles County; Orange County (Diamond Bar, Norwalk, Whittier)
Hilda Solis (El Monte)	Democratic	Assuming office on January 3, 2027		Elected in 2026.	2023–present Los Angeles County; Orange County (Diamond Bar, Norwalk, Whittier)

== Election results ==
=== 1962 ===
1962 United States House of Representatives elections in California
Party	Candidate	Votes	%
Republican	Patrick M. Martin	68,583	55.9
Democratic	Dalip Singh Saund (incumbent)	54,022	44.1
Total votes		122,605	100.0
Republican gain from Democratic			

=== 1964 ===
1964 United States House of Representatives elections in California
Party	Candidate	Votes	%
Democratic	John V. Tunney	85,661	52.8
Republican	Patrick M. Martin (incumbent)	76,525	47.2
Total votes		162,186	100.0
Democratic gain from Republican			

=== 1966 ===
1966 United States House of Representatives elections in California
Party	Candidate	Votes	%
Democratic	John V. Tunney (incumbent)	83,216	54.5
Republican	Robert R. Barry	69,444	45.5
Total votes		152,660	100.0
Democratic hold			

=== 1968 ===
1968 United States House of Representatives elections in California
Party	Candidate	Votes	%
Democratic	John V. Tunney (incumbent)	121,025	62.8
Republican	Robert O. Hunter	68,196	35.4
American Independent	James H. Griffin	2,415	1.2
Peace and Freedom	Terese A. Karmel	1,205	0.6
Total votes		192,841	100.0
Democratic hold			

=== 1970 ===
1970 United States House of Representatives elections in California
Party	Candidate	Votes	%
Republican	Victor Veysey	87,479	49.8
Democratic	David A. Tunno	85,684	48.8
American Independent	William E. Pasley	2,481	3.4
Total votes		175,644	100.0
Republican gain from Democratic			

=== 1972 ===
1972 United States House of Representatives elections in California
Party	Candidate	Votes	%
Democratic	George Brown, Jr.	77,776	56.3
Republican	Howard J. Snider	60,379	43.7
Total votes		138,155	100.0
Democratic hold			

=== 1974 ===
1974 United States House of Representatives elections in California
Party	Candidate	Votes	%
Democratic	Jerry M. Patterson	67,299	54.0
Republican	David Rehmann	51,509	41.3
American Independent	Lee R. Rayburn	3,991	3.2
Peace and Freedom	Larry B. Kallenberger	1,851	1.5
Total votes		124,650	100.0
Democratic gain from Republican			

=== 1976 ===
1976 United States House of Representatives elections in California
Party	Candidate	Votes	%
Democratic	Jerry M. Patterson (incumbent)	103,317	63.6
Republican	James "Jim" Combs	59,092	36.4
Total votes		162,409	100.0
Democratic hold			

=== 1978 ===
1978 United States House of Representatives elections in California
Party	Candidate	Votes	%
Democratic	Jerry M. Patterson (incumbent)	75,471	58.6
Republican	Dan Goedeke	53,298	41.4
Total votes		128,769	100.0
Democratic hold			

=== 1980 ===
1980 United States House of Representatives elections in California
Party	Candidate	Votes	%
Democratic	Jerry M. Patterson (incumbent)	91,880	55.5
Republican	Art Jacobson	66,256	40.0
Libertarian	Charles E. "Chuck" Heiser	7,301	4.5
Total votes		165,437	100.0
Democratic hold			

=== 1982 ===
1982 United States House of Representatives elections in California
Party	Candidate	Votes	%
Democratic	Jerry M. Patterson (incumbent)	73,914	52.4
Republican	William F. "Bill" Dohr	61,279	43.4
Libertarian	Anita K. Barr	5,989	4.2
Total votes		141,182	100.0
Republican gain from Democratic			

=== 1984 ===
1984 United States House of Representatives elections in California
Party	Candidate	Votes	%
Republican	Bob Dornan	86,545	53.2
Democratic	Jerry M. Patterson (incumbent)	73,231	45.0
Peace and Freedom	Michael Schuyles Bright	3,021	1.8
Total votes		162,797	100.0
Republican gain from Democratic			

=== 1986 ===
1986 United States House of Representatives elections in California
Party	Candidate	Votes	%
Republican	Bob Dornan (incumbent)	66,032	55.3
Democratic	Richard H. Robinson	50,625	42.4
Libertarian	Lee Connelly	2,807	2.3
Total votes		119,464	100.0
Republican hold			

=== 1988 ===
1988 United States House of Representatives elections in California
Party	Candidate	Votes	%
Republican	Bob Dornan (incumbent)	87,690	59.5
Democratic	Jerry Yudelson	52,399	35.6
Libertarian	Bruce McKay	3,733	2.5
Peace and Freedom	Frank German	3,547	2.4
Total votes		147,369	100.0
Republican hold			

=== 1990 ===
1990 United States House of Representatives elections in California
Party	Candidate	Votes	%
Republican	Bob Dornan (incumbent)	60,561	58.1
Democratic	Barbara Jackson	43,693	41.9
Total votes		104,254	100.0
Republican hold			

=== 1992 ===
1992 United States House of Representatives elections in California
Party	Candidate	Votes	%
Republican	Steve Horn	92,038	48.6
Democratic	Evan Anderson Braude	82,108	43.4
Peace and Freedom	Paul Burton	8,391	4.4
Libertarian	Blake Ashley	6,756	3.6
Independent	Brown (write-in)	14	0.0
Independent	Venable (write-in)	14	0.0
Total votes		189,321	100.0
Republican gain from Democratic			

=== 1994 ===
1994 United States House of Representatives elections in California
Party	Candidate	Votes	%
Republican	Steve Horn (incumbent)	85,225	58.5
Democratic	Peter Mathews	53,681	36.8
Libertarian	Lester W. Mueller	3,795	2.6
Peace and Freedom	Richard K. Green	2,995	2.1
No party	Duke (write-in)	73	0.0
Total votes		145,769	100.0
Republican hold			

=== 1996 ===
1996 United States House of Representatives elections in California
Party	Candidate	Votes	%
Republican	Steve Horn (incumbent)	88,136	52.6
Democratic	Rick Zbur	71,627	42.8
Green	William Yeager	4,610	2.7
Libertarian	Paul Gautreau	3,272	1.9
Total votes		195,545	100.0
Republican hold			

=== 1998 ===
1998 United States House of Representatives elections in California
Party	Candidate	Votes	%
Republican	Steve Horn (incumbent)	88,136	52.9
Democratic	Peter Mathews	71,627	44.3
Libertarian	David Bowers	3,705	2.8
Republican	Margherita Underhill (write-in)	17	0.0
Total votes		163,485	100.0
Republican hold			

=== 2000 ===
2000 United States House of Representatives elections in California
Party	Candidate	Votes	%
Republican	Steve Horn (incumbent)	87,266	48.5
Democratic	Gerrie Shcipske	85,498	47.5
Natural Law	Karen Blasdell-Wilkinson	3,744	2.0
Libertarian	Jack Neglia	3,614	2.0
Total votes		180,122	100.0
Republican hold			

=== 2002 ===
2002 United States House of Representatives elections in California
Party	Candidate	Votes	%
Democratic	Grace Napolitano (incumbent)	62,600	71.2
Republican	Alex A. Burrola	23,126	26.2
Libertarian	Al Cuperus	2,301	2.6
Total votes		88,027	100.0
Democratic hold			

=== 2004 ===
2004 United States House of Representatives elections in California
Party	Candidate	Votes	%
Democratic	Grace Napolitano (incumbent)	116,851	100.0
Democratic hold			

=== 2006 ===
2006 United States House of Representatives elections in California
Party	Candidate	Votes	%
Democratic	Grace Napolitano (incumbent)	75,181	75.4
Republican	Sidney W. Street	24,620	24.6
Total votes		99,801	100.0
Democratic hold			

=== 2008 ===
2008 United States House of Representatives elections in California
Party	Candidate	Votes	%
Democratic	Grace Napolitano (incumbent)	130,211	81.7
Libertarian	Christopher M. Agrella	29,113	18.3
Total votes		159,324	100.0
Democratic hold			

=== 2010 ===
2010 United States House of Representatives elections in California
Party	Candidate	Votes	%
Democratic	Grace Napolitano (incumbent)	85,459	73.4
Republican	Robert Vaughn	30,883	26.6
Total votes		116,342	100.00
Democratic hold			

=== 2012 ===
2012 United States House of Representatives elections in California
Party	Candidate	Votes	%
Democratic	Linda Sánchez (incumbent)	145,280	67.5
Republican	Benjamin Campos	69,807	32.5
Total votes		215,087	100.0
Democratic hold			

=== 2014 ===
2014 United States House of Representatives elections in California
Party	Candidate	Votes	%
Democratic	Linda Sánchez (incumbent)	58,192	59.1
Republican	Benjamin Campos	40,288	40.9
Total votes		98,480	100.0
Democratic hold			

=== 2016 ===
2016 United States House of Representatives elections in California
Party	Candidate	Votes	%
Democratic	Linda Sánchez (incumbent)	163,590	70.5
Republican	Ryan Downing	68,524	29.5
Total votes		232,114	100.0
Democratic hold			

=== 2018 ===
2018 United States House of Representatives elections in California
Party	Candidate	Votes	%
Democratic	Linda Sánchez (incumbent)	139,188	68.9
Republican	Ryan Downing	62,968	31.1
Total votes		202,156	100.0
Democratic hold			

=== 2020 ===
2020 United States House of Representatives elections in California
Party	Candidate	Votes	%
Democratic	Linda Sánchez (incumbent)	190,467	74.3
Democratic	Michael Tolar	65,739	25.7
Total votes		256,206	100.0
Democratic hold			

=== 2022 ===
2022 United States House of Representatives elections in California
Party	Candidate	Votes	%
Democratic	Linda Sánchez (incumbent)	101,260	58.1
Republican	Eric Ching	73,051	41.9
Total votes		174,311	100.0
Democratic hold			

=== 2024 ===
California's 38th congressional district, 2024
Primary election
Party	Candidate	Votes	%
Democratic	Linda Sánchez (incumbent)	62,325	56.18
Republican	Eric Ching	26,744	24.11
Republican	John Sarega	13,841	12.48
Republican	Robert Ochoa	8,034	7.24
Total votes		110,944	100
General election
Democratic	Linda Sánchez (incumbent)	165,110	59.84
Republican	Eric Ching	110,818	40.16
Total votes		275,928	100
Democratic hold			

=== 2026 ===
California's 38th congressional district, 2026
Primary election
Party	Candidate	Votes	%
Democratic	Hilda Solis	65,369	47.6
Republican	Pedro Casas	49,196	35.8
Democratic	Monica Sanchez	18,268	13.3
Democratic	Erik Lutz	4,443	3.2
Total votes		137,276	100.0
General election
Democratic	Hilda Solis		
Republican	Pedro Casas		
Total votes			

== Historical district boundaries ==
From 2003 through 2013, the district consisted of most of the San Gabriel Valley in Los Angeles County. Due to redistricting after the 2010 United States census, the district has moved east and south east in Los Angeles County and includes much of the previous areas as well as Bellflower and Artesia.

== See also ==
- List of United States congressional districts
- California's congressional districts
