= 1984 United States House of Representatives elections in California =

- November 6, 1984

All 45 California seats to the United States House of Representatives
	Majority party	Minority party
Party	Democratic	Republican
Last election	28	17
Seats won	27	18
Seat change	▼1	▲1
Popular vote	4,327,237	4,423,734
Percentage	48.33%	49.41%
- Results: Democratic hold Republican hold Republican gain

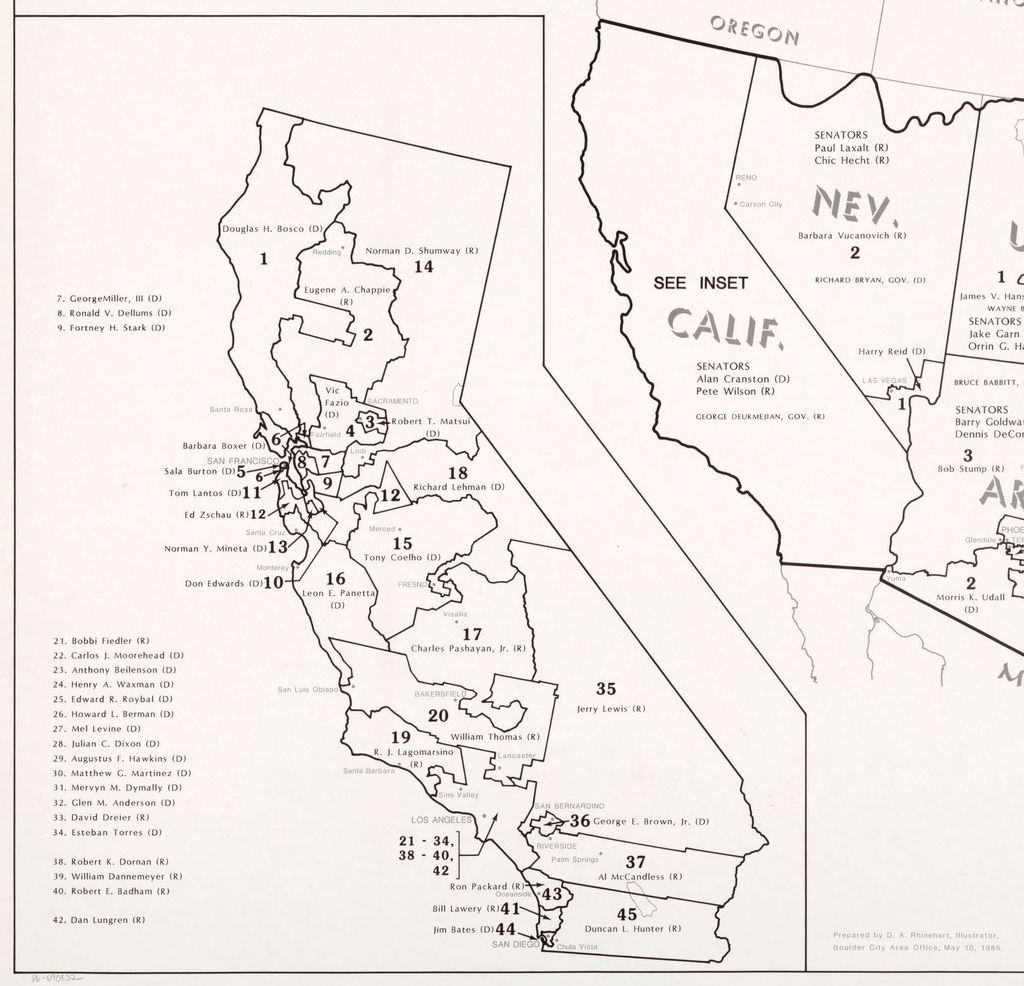
Resulting congressional representation mapped by district in January 1985 as part of the Western Area Power Administration congressional districts map.

The United States House of Representatives elections in California of 1984 was an election for California's delegation to the United States House of Representatives, which occurred as part of the general election of the House of Representatives on November 6, 1984. Only one incumbent, Democrat Jerry M. Patterson, lost reelection.

== Overview ==
United States House of Representatives elections in California, 1984
Party	Votes	%	Before	After	+/–
Republican	4,423,734	49.41%	17	18	+1
Democratic	4,327,237	48.33%	28	27	-1
Libertarian	128,219	1.43%	0	0	0
Peace and Freedom	61,543	0.69%	0	0	0
American Independent	12,601	0.14%	0	0	0
Totals	8,953,334	100.00%	45	45	—

== Results ==
Final results from the Clerk of the House of Representatives:

=== District 1 ===
California's 1st congressional district election, 1984
Party	Candidate	Votes	%
Democratic	Douglas H. Bosco (incumbent)	157,037	62.26
Republican	Floyd G. Sampson	95,186	37.74
Total votes		252,223	100.00
Turnout			
Democratic hold			

=== District 2 ===
California's 2nd congressional district election, 1984
Party	Candidate	Votes	%
Republican	Eugene A. Chappie (incumbent)	158,679	69.45
Democratic	Harry Cozad	69,793	30.55
Total votes		228,472	100.00
Turnout			
Republican hold			

=== District 3 ===
California's 3rd congressional district election, 1984
Party	Candidate	Votes	%
Democratic	Robert Matsui (incumbent)	131,369	100.00
Turnout			
Democratic hold			

=== District 4 ===
California's 4th congressional district election, 1984
Party	Candidate	Votes	%
Democratic	Vic Fazio (incumbent)	130,109	61.40
Republican	Roger B. Canfield	77,773	29.70
Libertarian	Roger Conant Pope	4,039	1.91
Total votes		211,921	100.00
Turnout			
Democratic hold			

=== District 5 ===
California's 5th congressional district election, 1984
Party	Candidate	Votes	%
Democratic	Sala Burton (incumbent)	139,692	72.30
Republican	Tom Spinosa	45,930	23.77
Libertarian	Joseph Fuhrig	4,008	2.07
Peace and Freedom	Henry Clark	3,574	1.85
Total votes		193,204	100.00
Turnout			
Democratic hold			

=== District 6 ===
California's 6th congressional district election, 1984
Party	Candidate	Votes	%
Democratic	Barbara Boxer (incumbent)	162,511	67.97
Republican	Douglas Binderup	71,011	29.70
Libertarian	Howard C. Creighton	5,574	2.33
Total votes		239,096	100.00
Turnout			
Democratic hold			

=== District 7 ===
California's 7th congressional district election, 1984
Party	Candidate	Votes	%
Democratic	George Miller (incumbent)	158,306	66.71
Republican	Rosemary Thaker	78,985	33.29
Total votes		237,291	100.00
Turnout			
Democratic hold			

=== District 8 ===
California's 8th congressional district election, 1984
Party	Candidate	Votes	%
Democratic	Ronald Dellums (incumbent)	144,316	60.33
Republican	Charles Connor	94,907	39.67
Total votes		239,223	100.00
Turnout			
Democratic hold			

=== District 9 ===
California's 9th congressional district election, 1984
Party	Candidate	Votes	%
Democratic	Pete Stark (incumbent)	136,511	69.90
Republican	J. T. "Eager" Beaver	51,399	26.32
Libertarian	Martha Fuhrig	7,398	3.79
Total votes		195,308	100.00
Turnout			
Democratic hold			

=== District 10 ===
California's 10th congressional district election, 1984
Party	Candidate	Votes	%
Democratic	Don Edwards (incumbent)	102,469	62.41
Republican	Bob Herriott	56,256	34.27
Libertarian	Perr Cardestam	2,789	1.70
American Independent	Edmon V. Kaiser	2,663	1.62
Total votes		164,177	100.00
Turnout			
Democratic hold			

=== District 11 ===
California's 11th congressional district election, 1984
Party	Candidate	Votes	%
Democratic	Tom Lantos (incumbent)	147,607	69.92
Republican	John J. "Jack" Hickey	59,625	28.24
American Independent	Nicholas W. Kudrovzeff	3,883	1.84
Total votes		211,115	100.00
Turnout			
Democratic hold			

=== District 12 ===
California's 12th congressional district election, 1984
Party	Candidate	Votes	%
Republican	Ed Zschau (incumbent)	155,795	61.59
Democratic	Martin Carnoy	91,026	35.98
Libertarian	William C. "Bill" White	5,872	2.32
Total votes		252,963	100.00
Turnout			
Republican hold			

=== District 13 ===
California's 13th congressional district election, 1984
Party	Candidate	Votes	%
Democratic	Norm Mineta (incumbent)	139,851	65.24
Republican	John D. "Jack" Williams	70,666	32.97
Libertarian	John R. Redding	3,836	1.79
Total votes		214,353	100.00
Turnout			
Democratic hold			

=== District 14 ===
California's 14th congressional district election, 1984
Party	Candidate	Votes	%
Republican	Norman D. Shumway (incumbent)	179,238	73.32
Democratic	Ruth Paula Carlson	58,384	23.88
Libertarian	Fred W. Colburn	6,850	2.80
Total votes		244,472	100.00
Turnout			
Republican hold			

=== District 15 ===
California's 15th congressional district election, 1984
Party	Candidate	Votes	%
Democratic	Tony Coelho (incumbent)	109,590	65.46
Republican	Carol Harner	54,730	32.69
Libertarian	Richard M. Harris	3,086	1.84
Total votes		167,406	100.00
Turnout			
Democratic hold			

=== District 16 ===
California's 16th congressional district election, 1984
Party	Candidate	Votes	%
Democratic	Leon Panetta (incumbent)	153,377	70.78
Republican	Patricia Smith Ramsey	60,065	27.72
Libertarian	Bill Anderson	3,245	1.50
Total votes		216,687	100.00
Turnout			
Democratic hold			

=== District 17 ===
California's 17th congressional district election, 1984
Party	Candidate	Votes	%
Republican	Charles (Chip) Pashayan (inc.)	128,802	72.49
Democratic	Simon Lakritz	48,888	27.51
Total votes		177,690	100.00
Turnout			
Republican hold			

=== District 18 ===
California's 18th congressional district election, 1984
Party	Candidate	Votes	%
Democratic	Richard Lehman (incumbent)	128,186	67.28
Republican	Dale L. Ewen	62,339	32.72
Total votes		190,525	100.00
Turnout			
Democratic hold			

=== District 19 ===
California's 19th congressional district election, 1984
Party	Candidate	Votes	%
Republican	Bob Lagomarsino (incumbent)	153,187	67.30
Democratic	James C. Carey, Jr.	70,278	30.87
Peace and Freedom	Charles J. Zekan	4,161	1.83
Total votes		227,626	100.00
Turnout			
Republican hold			

=== District 20 ===
California's 20th congressional district election, 1984
Party	Candidate	Votes	%
Republican	Bill Thomas (incumbent)	151,732	70.89
Democratic	Michael T. LeSage	62,307	29.11
Total votes		214,039	100.00
Turnout			
Republican hold			

=== District 21 ===
California's 21st congressional district election, 1984
Party	Candidate	Votes	%
Republican	Bobbi Fiedler (incumbent)	173,504	72.30
Democratic	Charles "Charlie" Davis	62,085	25.87
Libertarian	Robert Townsend Leet	4,379	1.82
Total votes		239,968	100.00
Turnout			
Republican hold			

=== District 22 ===
California's 22nd congressional district election, 1984
Party	Candidate	Votes	%
Republican	Carlos J. Moorhead (incumbent)	184,981	85.24
Libertarian	Michael B. Yauch	32,036	14.76
Total votes		217,017	100.00
Turnout			
Republican hold			

=== District 23 ===
California's 23rd congressional district election, 1984
Party	Candidate	Votes	%
Democratic	Anthony C. Beilenson (incumbent)	140,461	61.57
Republican	Claude W. Parrish	84,093	36.86
Libertarian	Larry Leathers	3,580	1.57
Total votes		228,134	100.00
Turnout			
Democratic hold			

=== District 24 ===
California's 24th congressional district election, 1984
Party	Candidate	Votes	%
Democratic	Henry Waxman (incumbent)	97,340	63.37
Republican	Jerry Zerg	51,010	33.21
Peace and Freedom	James Green	2,780	1.81
Libertarian	Tim Custer	2,477	1.61
Total votes		153,607	100.00
Turnout			
Democratic hold			

=== District 25 ===
California's 25th congressional district election, 1984
Party	Candidate	Votes	%
Democratic	Edward R. Roybal (incumbent)	74,261	71.68
Republican	Roy D. "Bill" Bloxom	24,968	24.10
Libertarian	Anthony G. Bajada	4,370	4.22
Total votes		103,599	100.00
Turnout			
Democratic hold			

=== District 26 ===
California's 26th congressional district election, 1984
Party	Candidate	Votes	%
Democratic	Howard Berman (incumbent)	117,080	62.79
Republican	Miriam Ojeda	69,372	37.21
Total votes		186,452	100.00
Turnout			
Democratic hold			

=== District 27 ===
California's 27th congressional district election, 1984
Party	Candidate	Votes	%
Democratic	Mel Levine (incumbent)	116,933	54.95
Republican	Robert B. Scribner	88,896	41.78
Peace and Freedom	Thomas L. O'Connor, Jr.	3,815	1.79
Libertarian	Jeff Avrech	3,137	1.47
Total votes		212,781	100.00
Turnout			
Democratic hold			

=== District 28 ===
California's 28th congressional district election, 1984
Party	Candidate	Votes	%
Democratic	Julian C. Dixon (incumbent)	113,076	75.63
Republican	Beatrice M. Jett	33,511	22.41
Libertarian	Don Swemgimurti Federick	2,930	1.96
Total votes		149,517	100.00
Turnout			
Democratic hold			

=== District 29 ===
California's 29th congressional district election, 1984
Party	Candidate	Votes	%
Democratic	Augustus F. Hawkins (incumbent)	108,777	86.63
Republican	Echo Y. Goto	16,781	13.37
Total votes		125,558	100.00
Turnout			
Democratic hold			

=== District 30 ===
California's 30th congressional district election, 1984
Party	Candidate	Votes	%
Democratic	Matthew G. Martinez (incumbent)	64,378	51.78
Republican	Richard Gomez	53,900	43.35
American Independent	Houston A. Meyers	6,055	4.87
Total votes		124,333	100.00
Turnout			
Democratic hold			

=== District 31 ===
California's 31st congressional district election, 1984
Party	Candidate	Votes	%
Democratic	Mervyn M. Dymally (incumbent)	100,658	70.71
Republican	Henry C. Minturn	41,691	29.29
Total votes		142,349	100.00
Turnout			
Democratic hold			

=== District 32 ===
California's 32nd congressional district election, 1984
Party	Candidate	Votes	%
Democratic	Glenn M. Anderson (incumbent)	102,961	60.67
Republican	Roger E. Fiola	62,176	36.64
Libertarian	Mark F. Denny	2,517	1.48
Peace and Freedom	Patrick John McCoy	2,051	1.21
Total votes		169,705	100.00
Turnout			
Democratic hold			

=== District 33 ===
California's 33rd congressional district election, 1984
Party	Candidate	Votes	%
Republican	David Dreier (incumbent)	147,363	70.64
Democratic	Claire K. McDonald	54,147	25.95
Libertarian	Gail Lightfoot	4,738	2.27
Peace and Freedom	James Michael "Mike" Noonan	2,371	1.14
Total votes		208,619	100.00
Turnout			
Republican hold			

=== District 34 ===
California's 34th congressional district election, 1984
Party	Candidate	Votes	%
Democratic	Esteban Torres (incumbent)	87,060	59.82
Republican	Paul R. Jackson	58,467	40.18
Total votes		145,527	100.00
Turnout			
Democratic hold			

=== District 35 ===
California's 35th congressional district election, 1984
Party	Candidate	Votes	%
Republican	Jerry Lewis (incumbent)	176,477	85.47
Peace and Freedom	Kevin Akin	29,990	14.53
Total votes		206,467	100.00
Turnout			
Republican hold			

=== District 36 ===
California's 36th congressional district election, 1984
Party	Candidate	Votes	%
Democratic	George Brown, Jr. (incumbent)	104,438	56.60
Republican	John Paul Stark	80,212	43.40
Total votes		184,650	100.00
Turnout			
Democratic hold			

=== District 37 ===
California's 37th congressional district election, 1984
Party	Candidate	Votes	%
Republican	Al McCandless (incumbent)	149,955	60.99
Democratic	David E. "Dave" Skinner	85,908	34.94
Total votes		245,863	100.00
Turnout			
Republican hold			

=== District 38 ===
California's 38th congressional district election, 1984
Party	Candidate	Votes	%
Republican	Bob Dornan	86,545	53.16
Democratic	Jerry M. Patterson (incumbent)	73,231	44.98
Peace and Freedom	Michael Schuyles Bright	3,021	1.86
Total votes		162,797	100.00
Turnout			
Republican gain from Democratic			

=== District 39 ===
California's 39th congressional district election, 1984
Party	Candidate	Votes	%
Republican	William E. Dannemeyer (incumbent)	175,788	76.21
Democratic	Robert E. Ward	54,889	23.79
Total votes		230,677	100.00
Turnout			
Republican hold			

=== District 40 ===
California's 40th congressional district election, 1984
Party	Candidate	Votes	%
Republican	Robert Badham (incumbent)	164,257	64.42
Democratic	Carol Ann Bradford	86,748	34.02
Peace and Freedom	Maxine Bell Quirk	3,969	1.56
Total votes		254,974	100.00
Turnout			
Republican hold			

=== District 41 ===
California's 41st congressional district election, 1984
Party	Candidate	Votes	%
Republican	Bill Lowery (incumbent)	161,068	63.45
Democratic	Bob Simmons	85,475	33.67
Libertarian	Sara Baase	7,303	2.88
Total votes		253,846	100.00
Turnout			
Republican hold			

=== District 42 ===
California's 42nd congressional district election, 1984
Party	Candidate	Votes	%
Republican	Dan Lungren (incumbent)	177,783	72.98
Democratic	Mary Lou Brophy	60,025	24.64
Peace and Freedom	John S. Donohue	5,811	2.39
Total votes		243,619	100.00
Turnout			
Republican hold			

=== District 43 ===
California's 43rd congressional district election, 1984
Party	Candidate	Votes	%
Republican	Ron Packard (incumbent)	165,643	74.11
Democratic	Lois E. Humphreys	50,996	22.82
Libertarian	Phyllis Avery	6,878	3.08
Total votes		223,517	100.00
Turnout			
Republican hold			

=== District 44 ===
California's 44th congressional district election, 1984
Party	Candidate	Votes	%
Democratic	Jim Bates (incumbent)	99,378	69.71
Republican	Neill Campbell	39,977	28.04
Libertarian	Jim Conole	3,206	2.25
Total votes		142,561	100.00
Turnout			
Democratic hold			

=== District 45 ===
California's 45th congressional district election, 1984
Party	Candidate	Votes	%
Republican	Duncan Hunter (incumbent)	149,011	75.14
Democratic	David W. Guthrie	45,325	22.86
Libertarian	Patrick "Pat" Wright	3,971	2.00
Total votes		198,307	100.00
Turnout			
Republican hold			

== See also ==
- 99th United States Congress
- Political party strength in California
- Political party strength in U.S. states
- 1984 United States House of Representatives elections
