= East Whittier, California =

- Unincorporated community Census designated place
- Location of East Whittier in Los Angeles County, California.

- Location in the United States
- Coordinates: 33°55′28″N 117°59′20″W
- Country: United States
- State: California
- County: Los Angeles

Area
  - Total: 1.090 sq mi (2.823 km^{2})
  - Land: 1.090 sq mi (2.823 km^{2})
  - Water: 0 sq mi (0 km^{2}) 0%
- Elevation: 226 ft (69 m)

Population (2020)
  - Total: 10,394
  - Density: 9,536/sq mi (3,682/km^{2})
- Time zone: UTC-8 (PST)
  - Summer (DST): UTC-7 (PDT)
- ZIP code: 90604
- Area code: 562
- FIPS code: 06-21292
- GNIS feature ID: 1867017

East Whittier is an unincorporated community in Los Angeles County, California, United States. The population was 10,394 at the 2020 census, up from 9,757 at the 2010 census. For statistical purposes, the United States Census Bureau has defined this community as a census-designated place (CDP). The name was changed from East La Mirada in 2012, likely due to its precise location in relation to the city of Whittier.

The previous delineation of East Whittier CDP occurred during the 1960 census, when the area recorded a population of 19,884. This delineation encompassed different boundaries than the current East Whittier, including areas that were annexed to Whittier, California in the 1960s.

== Geography ==
East Whittier is located at 33°55′28″N 117°59′20″W (33.924403, -117.988975).

According to the United States Census Bureau, the CDP has a total area of 1.1 square miles (2.8 km^{2}), all land.

=== Surrounding areas ===
Whittier
South Whittier La Habra
La Mirada La Habra
La Mirada La Habra
La Mirada

== Demographics ==
Historical population
Census	Pop.	Note	%±
1970	12,339		—
1980	9,688		−21.5%
1990	9,367		−3.3%
2000	9,538		1.8%
2010	9,757		2.3%
2020	10,394		6.5%
U.S. Decennial Census; 1850–1870 1880-1890; 1900 1910 1920; 1930 1940 1950; 1960 1970 1980; 1990 2000 2010; 2020

East Whittier first appeared as an unincorporated community under the name East La Mirada in the 1970 U.S. census; and as a census designated place in the 1980 U.S. census. The name was change to East Whittier after the 2010 U.S. census.

=== Racial and ethnic composition ===
East Whittier CDP, California – Racial and ethnic composition Note: the US Census treats Hispanic/Latino as an ethnic category. This table excludes Latinos from the racial categories and assigns them to a separate category. Hispanics/Latinos may be of any race.
Race / Ethnicity (NH = Non-Hispanic)	Pop 2000	Pop 2010	Pop 2020	% 2000	% 2010	% 2020
White alone (NH)	5,164	4,046	3,114	54.14%	41.47%	29.96%
Black or African American alone (NH)	158	160	181	1.66%	1.64%	1.74%
Native American or Alaska Native alone (NH)	35	21	42	0.37%	0.22%	0.40%
Asian alone (NH)	330	444	726	3.46%	4.55%	6.98%
Native Hawaiian or Pacific Islander alone (NH)	10	11	32	0.10%	0.11%	0.31%
Other race alone (NH)	11	11	69	0.12%	0.11%	0.66%
Mixed race or Multiracial (NH)	190	157	296	1.99%	1.61%	2.85%
Hispanic or Latino (any race)	3,640	4,907	5,934	38.16%	50.29%	57.09%
Total	9,538	9,757	10,394	100.00%	100.00%	100.00%

=== 2020 census ===
As of the 2020 census, East Whittier had a population of 10,394 and a population density of 9,535.8 inhabitants per square mile (3,681.8/km^{2}). The census reported that 99.1% of the population lived in households, 0.9% lived in non-institutionalized group quarters, and no one was institutionalized.

100.0% of residents lived in urban areas, while 0.0% lived in rural areas.

There were 3,370 households, of which 37.3% had children under the age of 18 living in them. Of all households, 55.0% were married-couple households, 6.8% were cohabiting couple households, 13.0% had a male householder with no spouse or partner present, and 25.3% had a female householder with no spouse or partner present. About 16.7% of households were made up of individuals and 8.5% had someone living alone who was 65 years of age or older. The average household size was 3.06, and there were 2,616 families (77.6% of all households).

The age distribution was 22.2% under the age of 18, 9.2% aged 18 to 24, 26.4% aged 25 to 44, 26.5% aged 45 to 64, and 15.7% aged 65 or older. The median age was 38.6 years. For every 100 females, there were 91.6 males, and for every 100 females age 18 and over there were 90.5 males age 18 and over.

There were 3,467 housing units at an average density of 3,180.7 units per square mile (1,228.1 units/km^{2}). Of the 3,370 occupied units (97.2% of all units), 64.2% were owner-occupied and 35.8% were occupied by renters. The homeowner vacancy rate was 0.7%, and the rental vacancy rate was 4.1%.

=== 2010 census ===
The 2010 United States census reported that the CDP had a population of 9,757. The population density was 8,947.4 inhabitants per square mile (3,454.6/km^{2}). The racial makeup of the CDP was 7,022 (72.0%) White (41.5% Non-Hispanic White), 178 (1.8%) African American, 78 (0.8%) Native American, 462 (4.7%) Asian, 20 (0.2%) Pacific Islander, 1,557 (16.0%) from other races, and 440 (4.5%) from two or more races. Hispanic or Latino of any race were 4,907 persons (50.3%).

The Census reported that 9,742 people (99.8% of the population) lived in households, 15 (0.2%) lived in non-institutionalized group quarters, and 0 (0%) were institutionalized.

There were 3,295 households, out of which 1,298 (39.4%) had children under the age of 18 living in them, 1,826 (55.4%) were opposite-sex married couples living together, 479 (14.5%) had a female householder with no husband present, 201 (6.1%) had a male householder with no wife present. There were 195 (5.9%) unmarried opposite-sex partnerships, and 21 (0.6%) same-sex married couples or partnerships. 619 households (18.8%) were made up of individuals, and 303 (9.2%) had someone living alone who was 65 years of age or older. The average household size was 2.96. There were 2,506 families (76.1% of all households); the average family size was 3.36.

The population was spread out, with 2,356 people (24.1%) under the age of 18, 1,117 people (11.4%) aged 18 to 24, 2,636 people (27.0%) aged 25 to 44, 2,389 people (24.5%) aged 45 to 64, and 1,259 people (12.9%) who were 65 years of age or older. The median age was 36.2 years. For every 100 females, there were 94.2 males. For every 100 females age 18 and over, there were 91.9 males.

There were 3,391 housing units at an average density of 3,109.6 per square mile (1,200.6/km^{2}), of which 2,125 (64.5%) were owner-occupied, and 1,170 (35.5%) were occupied by renters. The homeowner vacancy rate was 0.6%; the rental vacancy rate was 4.6%. 6,598 people (67.6% of the population) lived in owner-occupied housing units and 3,144 people (32.2%) lived in rental housing units.

=== Income and poverty ===
According to the United States Census Bureau, East Whittier has a median household income of $68,110, with 5.1% of the population living below the federal poverty line.

In 2023, the US Census Bureau estimated that the median household income was $105,104, and the per capita income was $40,848. About 1.2% of families and 4.3% of the population were below the poverty line.

== Government ==
In the California State Legislature, East Whittier is in the 34th senatorial district, represented by Democrat Tom Umberg, and in the 64th Assembly district, represented by Democrat Blanca Pacheco.

In the United States House of Representatives, East Whittier is in California's 38th congressional district, represented by Democrat Linda Sánchez.

The community is represented at the local government level by Los Angeles County Supervisor Janice Hahn.

Police services are provided by the Los Angeles County Sheriff's Department station located in Norwalk.

Fire services are provided by Los Angeles County Fire Department via Fire Station 15, located at 11460 Santa Gertrudes Avenue. Station 15 is staffed with four personnel that are deployed on a Quint fire apparatus.

Paramedic services are provided from nearby stations in La Mirada (Squad 49), and La Habra (Squad 191).

== Climate ==
According to the Köppen Climate Classification system, East Whittier has a warm-summer Mediterranean climate, abbreviated "Csa" on climate maps.

Climate data for East Whittier, California
Month	Jan	Feb	Mar	Apr	May	Jun	Jul	Aug	Sep	Oct	Nov	Dec	Year
Mean daily maximum °F (°C)	66 (19)	67 (19)	67 (19)	69 (21)	70 (21)	73 (23)	77 (25)	78 (26)	78 (26)	75 (24)	71 (22)	67 (19)	71 (22)
Mean daily minimum °F (°C)	49 (9)	50 (10)	51 (11)	53 (12)	56 (13)	59 (15)	62 (17)	63 (17)	62 (17)	59 (15)	54 (12)	50 (10)	56 (13)
Average precipitation inches (mm)	4.1 (100)	4.9 (120)	3.5 (89)	0.9 (23)	0.3 (7.6)	0.1 (2.5)	0 (0)	0.2 (5.1)	0.3 (7.6)	0.6 (15)	1.4 (36)	2.4 (61)	18.7 (470)
Source: Weatherbase
