= Jerry M. Patterson =

American politician (1934–2024)

Jerry Patterson
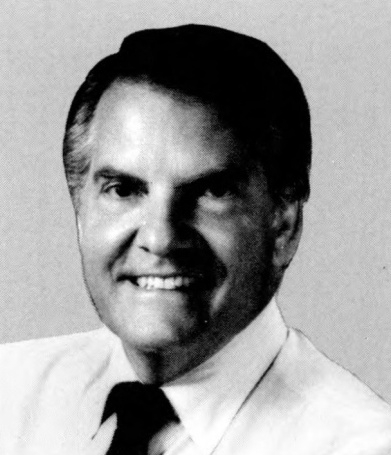
- Patterson in 1983

Member of the U.S. House of Representatives from California's 38th district
- In office January 3, 1975 – January 3, 1985
- Preceded by: George Brown Jr.
- Succeeded by: Bob Dornan

Personal details
- Born: Jerry Mumford Patterson; October 25, 1934 El Paso, Texas, U.S.
- Died: November 8, 2024 (aged 90) Fountain Valley, California, U.S.
- Party: Democratic
- Education: California State University, Long Beach (BA); University of Southern California (attended); University of California, Los Angeles (JD)

Military service
- Allegiance: United States
- Branch/service: United States Coast Guard
- Years of service: 1953–1957

Jerry Mumford Patterson (October 25, 1934 – November 8, 2024) was an American lawyer, educator and Democratic Party politician who represented California in the United States House of Representatives from 1975 to 1985. He was elected from the state's 38th congressional district, consisting of urban portions of Orange County, including his hometown of Santa Ana, where he served as a city councilman from 1969 to 1973 and mayor between 1973 and 1975.

He was the first member of the Democratic Party to be elected from a district entirely within Orange County.

== Early life, education, military service ==
Born in El Paso, Texas, Patterson graduated from Tucson High School in Tucson, Arizona in 1952. He served in the United States Coast Guard from 1953 to 1957. Patterson completed a BA at Cal State Long Beach (1960), 30 graduate units at the USC School of Public Administration (1961 to 1963), and a JD at UCLA School of Law (1966).

== Legal and political career ==
Patterson was admitted to the California bar in 1967 and establishing a practice in Santa Ana. He was a Santa Ana city councilman from 1969 to 1973. He was concurrently the mayor of Santa Ana and the city attorney of Placentia from 1973 to 1975.

== House of Representatives ==
Congressman Patterson was the first Democrat to be elected to Congress from a district entirely within Orange County, California. He served five terms from January 3, 1975, until January 3, 1985, until he lost a reelection bid to Bob Dornan in November 1984.

In Congress, he served as chairman of the Select Committee on Committee Reform from March 20, 1979 to April 30, 1980, and chaired the House Subcommittee on International Development Finance in the Ninety-seventh and Ninety-eighth Congresses. Patterson was also a member of the United States House Select Committee on Children, Youth, and Families.

He worked on legislation promoting banking transparency, in addition to his focus on refugee issues, particularly those impacting the influx Vietnamese refugees following the Vietnam War.

== Post-congressional career ==
Patterson resumed the practice of law in Costa Mesa in 1986. He was a professor at Cal State Long Beach from 1986 to 1999. He became the city attorney of Cypress in 1987, Dana Point, California in 1989 and Lake Forest, California in 1991. Patterson retired from his law practice in 1997 and became president of his own public affairs consulting firm in 1998. He continued as an educator, community activist and member of nonprofit boards and commissions.

=== Local public office ===
In 1996 Patterson returned to elective office when he won a seat on the Coast Community College District Board of Trustees where he served on the college board for Orange Coast College, Golden West College and Coastline Community College.

During his time on the Santa Ana City Council, Patterson led the effort to establish a federal courthouse in the community, make improvements to the regional transportation system, and enclose the Santa Ana River.

== Personal life and death ==
Patterson lived in Fountain Valley, with his wife, Linda Moulton-Patterson. They had four adult children and six grandchildren.

Patterson died on November 8, 2024, two weeks after his 90th birthday.

== Electoral history ==
1974 United States House of Representatives elections in California
Party	Candidate	Votes	%
Democratic	Jerry M. Patterson	67,299	54.0
Republican	David Rehmann	51,509	41.3
American Independent	Lee R. Rayburn	3,991	3.2
Peace and Freedom	Larry B. Kallenberger	1,851	1.5
Total votes		124,650	100.0
Democratic gain from Republican			

1976 United States House of Representatives elections in California
Party	Candidate	Votes	%
Democratic	Jerry M. Patterson (incumbent)	103,317	63.6
Republican	James "Jim" Combs	59,092	36.4
Total votes		162,409	100.0
Democratic hold			

1978 United States House of Representatives elections in California
Party	Candidate	Votes	%
Democratic	Jerry M. Patterson (incumbent)	75,471	58.6
Republican	Dan Goedeke	53,298	41.4
Total votes		128,769	100.0
Democratic hold			

1980 United States House of Representatives elections in California
Party	Candidate	Votes	%
Democratic	Jerry M. Patterson (incumbent)	91,880	55.5
Republican	Art Jacobson	66,256	40.0
Libertarian	Charles E. "Chuck" Heiser	7,301	4.5
Total votes		165,437	100.0
Democratic hold			

1982 United States House of Representatives elections in California
Party	Candidate	Votes	%
Democratic	Jerry M. Patterson (incumbent)	73,914	52.4
Republican	William F. "Bill" Dohr	61,279	43.4
Libertarian	Anita K. Barr	5,989	4.2
Total votes		141,182	100.0
Democratic gain from Republican			

1984 United States House of Representatives elections in California
Party	Candidate	Votes	%
Republican	Bob Dornan	86,545	53.2
Democratic	Jerry M. Patterson (incumbent)	73,231	45.0
Peace and Freedom	Michael Schuyles Bright	3,021	1.8
Total votes		162,797	100.0
Republican gain from Democratic			

U.S. House of Representatives
Preceded by George Brown Jr.	Member of the U.S. House of Representatives from California's 38th congressional district 1975–1985	Succeeded by Bob Dornan
New office	Chair of the House Committee Reform Committee; 1979–1980	Position abolished
