= South Whittier, California =

- Unincorporated community Census designated place
- Interactive map of South Whittier, California
- Location in California Location in the United States
- Coordinates: 33°56′5″N 118°1′51″W
- Country: United States
- State: California
- County: Los Angeles

Area
  - Total: 5.347 sq mi (13.848 km^{2})
  - Land: 5.338 sq mi (13.825 km^{2})
  - Water: 0.0089 sq mi (0.023 km^{2}) 0.16%
- Elevation: 177 ft (54 m)

Population (April 1, 2020)
  - Total: 56,415
  - Density: 10,569/sq mi (4,080.7/km^{2})
- Time zone: UTC-8 (Pacific)
  - Summer (DST): UTC-7 (PDT)
- ZIP code: 90602
- Area code: 562
- FIPS code: 06-73430
- GNIS feature ID: 1661484

South Whittier is an unincorporated community in Los Angeles County, California, United States, just south of the city of Whittier. For statistical purposes, the United States Census Bureau has defined South Whittier as a census-designated place (CDP). As of the 2020 census, the CDP had a total population of 56,415, down from 57,156 at the 2010 census.

== Geography ==
South Whittier is located at 33°56′5″N 118°1′51″W (33.934724, -118.030800).

According to the United States Census Bureau, the CDP has a total area of 5.3 square miles (13.8 km^{2}), over 99% of which is land.

=== Climate ===
According to the Köppen Climate Classification system, South Whittier has a warm-summer Mediterranean climate, abbreviated "Csa" on climate maps.

== Demographics ==
Historical population
Census	Pop.	Note	%±
1970	46,461		—
1980	43,815		−5.7%
1990	49,514		13.0%
2000	55,193		11.5%
2010	57,156		3.6%
2020	56,415		−1.3%
U.S. Decennial Census; 1860–1870 1880-1890; 1900 1910 1920; 1930 1940 1950; 1960 1970 1980; 1990 2000 2010; 2020

South Whittier first appeared as an unincorporated place in the 1970 U.S. census as part of the Whittier census county division; and as a census designated place in the 1980 United States census.

=== Racial and ethnic composition ===
South Whittier CDP, California – Racial and ethnic composition Note: the US Census treats Hispanic/Latino as an ethnic category. This table excludes Latinos from the racial categories and assigns them to a separate category. Hispanics/Latinos may be of any race.
Race / Ethnicity (NH = Non-Hispanic)	Pop 2000	Pop 2010	Pop 2020	% 2000	% 2010	% 2020
White alone (NH)	13,654	9,526	6,846	24.74%	16.67%	12.14%
Black or African American alone (NH)	616	601	643	1.12%	1.05%	1.14%
Native American or Alaska Native alone (NH)	180	139	139	0.33%	0.24%	0.25%
Asian alone (NH)	1,574	2,151	2,585	2.85%	3.76%	4.58%
Native Hawaiian or Pacific Islander alone (NH)	103	76	103	0.19%	0.13%	0.18%
Other race alone (NH)	67	62	230	0.12%	0.11%	0.41%
Mixed race or Multiracial (NH)	743	507	789	1.35%	0.89%	1.40%
Hispanic or Latino (any race)	38,256	44,094	45,080	69.31%	77.15%	79.91%
Total	55,193	57,156	56,415	100.00%	100.00%	100.00%

=== 2020 census ===
As of the 2020 census, South Whittier had a population of 56,415 and a population density of 10,568.6 inhabitants per square mile (4,080.6/km^{2}). The census reported that 99.5% of residents lived in households and 0.5% lived in non-institutionalized group quarters, with none institutionalized.

The median age was 35.8 years; 23.5% of residents were under the age of 18, 10.7% were 18 to 24, 28.4% were 25 to 44, 25.2% were 45 to 64, and 12.1% were 65 or older. For every 100 females there were 97.2 males, and for every 100 females age 18 and over there were 94.5 males.

100.0% of residents lived in urban areas, while 0.0% lived in rural areas.

There were 15,430 households, of which 44.2% had children under the age of 18 living in them. Of all households, 53.2% were married-couple households, 7.0% were cohabiting couple households, 25.0% were households with a female householder and no spouse or partner present, and 14.7% were households with a male householder and no spouse or partner present. About 13.0% of all households were made up of individuals and 6.0% had someone living alone who was 65 years of age or older. The average household size was 3.64. There were 12,765 families (82.7% of all households).

There were 15,825 housing units at an average density of 2,964.6 units per square mile (1,144.6 units/km^{2}), of which 15,430 (97.5%) were occupied. Of the occupied units, 64.3% were owner-occupied and 35.7% were occupied by renters. The homeowner vacancy rate was 0.9% and the rental vacancy rate was 3.0%.

Racial composition as of the 2020 census
Race	Number	Percent
White	14,781	26.2%
Black or African American	841	1.5%
American Indian and Alaska Native	1,425	2.5%
Asian	2,797	5.0%
Native Hawaiian and Other Pacific Islander	131	0.2%
Some other race	22,889	40.6%
Two or more races	13,551	24.0%
Hispanic or Latino (of any race)	45,080	79.9%

=== 2010 census ===
At the 2010 census South Whittier had a population of 57,156. The population density was 10,691.8 inhabitants per square mile (4,128.1/km^{2}). The racial makeup of South Whittier was 33,663 (58.9%) White (16.7% Non-Hispanic White), 859 (1.5%) African American, 743 (1.3%) Native American, 2,305 (4.0%) Asian, 147 (0.3%) Pacific Islander, 17,085 (29.9%) from other races, and 2,354 (4.1%) from two or more races. Hispanic or Latino of any race were 44,094 persons (77.1%).

The census reported that 56,859 people (99.5% of the population) lived in households, 282 (0.5%) lived in non-institutionalized group quarters, and 15 (0%) were institutionalized.

There were 15,067 households, 7,647 (50.8%) had children under the age of 18 living in them, 8,500 (56.4%) were opposite-sex married couples living together, 2,678 (17.8%) had a female householder with no husband present, 1,276 (8.5%) had a male householder with no wife present. There were 979 (6.5%) unmarried opposite-sex partnerships, and 110 (0.7%) same-sex married couples or partnerships. 1,943 households (12.9%) were one person and 810 (5.4%) had someone living alone who was 65 or older. The average household size was 3.77. There were 12,454 families (82.7% of households); the average family size was 4.05.

The age distribution was 16,274 people (28.5%) under the age of 18, 6,637 people (11.6%) aged 18 to 24, 16,369 people (28.6%) aged 25 to 44, 12,891 people (22.6%) aged 45 to 64, and 4,985 people (8.7%) who were 65 or older. The median age was 32.0 years. For every 100 females, there were 98.5 males. For every 100 females age 18 and over, there were 97.0 males.

There were 15,600 housing units at an average density of 2,918.2 per square mile, of the occupied units 9,563 (63.5%) were owner-occupied and 5,504 (36.5%) were rented. The homeowner vacancy rate was 1.1%; the rental vacancy rate was 3.7%. 36,050 people (63.1% of the population) lived in owner-occupied housing units and 20,809 people (36.4%) lived in rental housing units.

According to the 2010 United States Census, South Whittier had a median household income of $65,815, with 11.4% of the population living below the federal poverty line.

=== 2023 ACS estimates ===
In 2023, the US Census Bureau estimated that the median household income was $98,974, and the per capita income was $32,460. About 7.4% of families and 8.4% of the population were below the poverty line.

== Government ==
In the California State Legislature, South Whittier is in the 34th senatorial district, represented by Democrat Tom Umberg, and in the 64th Assembly district, represented by Democrat Blanca Pacheco.

In the United States House of Representatives, South Whittier is in California's 38th congressional district, represented by Democrat Linda Sánchez.

The Los Angeles County Sheriff's Department (LASD) operates the Norwalk Station in Norwalk, serving South Whittier. In addition the department operates the Whittier Substation in South Whittier.

== See also ==
- Whittier, California
