= 2010 California State Treasurer election =

- November 2, 2010
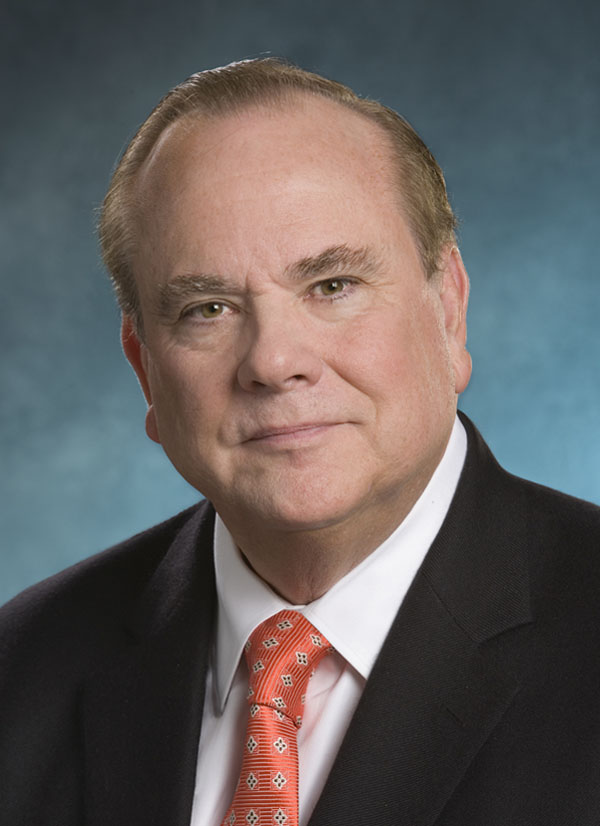

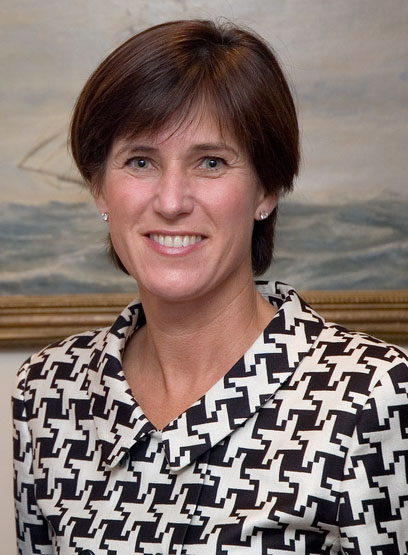
Nominee	Bill Lockyer	Mimi Walters
Party	Democratic	Republican
Popular vote	5,433,222	3,479,709
Percentage	56.46%	36.16%
- County results Lockyer: 40–50% 50–60% 60–70% 70–80% Walters: 40–50% 50–60% 60–70%
Treasurer before election
Bill Lockyer
Democratic
Elected Treasurer
Bill Lockyer
Democratic

The 2010 California State Treasurer election was held on November 2, 2010, to choose the State Treasurer of California. The primary election was held on June 8, 2010. Democratic Incumbent Bill Lockyer won reelection.

== Candidates ==
The following were certified by the California Secretary of State as candidates in the primary election for State Treasurer. Candidates who won their respective primaries and qualified for the general election are shown in bold.

=== American Independent ===
- **Robert Lauten**

=== Democratic ===
- **Bill Lockyer**, incumbent State Treasurer

=== Green ===
- **Charles "Kit" Crittenden**, retired professor

=== Libertarian ===
- **Edward Teyssier**, business owner/attorney

=== Peace and Freedom ===
- **Debra L. Reiger**, retired technology manager

=== Republican ===
- **Mimi Walters**, state senator

== Primary results ==
California State Treasurer primary, 2010
Party	Candidate	Votes	%
Democratic	Bill Lockyer (incumbent)	2,051,698	100.0
Republican	Mimi Walters	1,761,188	100.0
American Independent	Robert Lauten	39,688	100.0
Green	Charles "Kit" Crittenden	20,927	100.0
Libertarian	Edward Teyssier	18,037	100.0
Peace and Freedom	Debra L. Reiger	3,853	100.0

== General results ==
California State Treasurer election, 2010
Party	Candidate	Votes	%	±%
**Democratic**	**Bill Lockyer (incumbent)**	**5,433,222**	**56.46%**	**+2.09%**
Republican	Mimi Walters	3,479,709	36.16%	−1.05%
Green	Charles "Kit" Crittenden	231,160	2.40%	−0.02%
Libertarian	Edward M. Teyssier	218,384	2.27%	−1.74%
American Independent	Robert Lauten	135,931	1.41%	+0.29%
Peace and Freedom	Debra L. Reiger	125,566	1.30%	+0.44%
Total votes		**9,623,972**	**100.0%**	
Democratic **hold**				
