= 1962 United States House of Representatives elections in California =

- November 6, 1962

All 38 California seats to the United States House of Representatives
	Majority party	Minority party
Party	Democratic	Republican
Last election	16	14
Seats won	25	13
Seat change	▲9	▼1
Popular vote	2,891,618	2,679,662
Percentage	51.88%	48.08%
- Democratic gain Republican gain Democratic hold Republican hold

The United States House of Representatives elections in California, 1962 was an election for California's delegation to the United States House of Representatives, which occurred as part of the general election of the House of Representatives on November 6, 1962. California gained eight districts as a result of the 1960 census, seven of which were won by Democrats and one by a Republican. Of California's existing districts, Democrats picked up three and lost one.

== Overview ==
United States House of Representatives elections in California, 1962
Party	Votes	%	Before	After	+/–
Democratic	2,891,618	51.88%	16	25	+9
Republican	2,679,662	48.08%	14	13	-1
Scattering	2,166	0.04%	0	0	0
Totals	5,573,446	100.00%	30	38	+8

== Results ==
Final results from the Clerk of the House of Representatives:

=== District 1 ===
California's 1st congressional district election, 1962
Party	Candidate	Votes	%
Democratic	Clement Woodnutt Miller (inc.)	100,962	50.75
Republican	Don H. Clausen	97,949	49.23
No party	Scattering	31	0.02
Total votes		198,942	100.00
Turnout			
Democratic hold			

=== District 2 ===
California's 2nd congressional district election, 1962
Party	Candidate	Votes	%
Democratic	Harold T. Johnson (incumbent)	106,239	64.62
Republican	Frederic H. Nagel	58,150	35.37
No party	Scattering	8	0.00
Total votes		164,397	100.00
Turnout			
Democratic hold			

=== District 3 ===
California's 3rd congressional district election, 1962
Party	Candidate	Votes	%
Democratic	John E. Moss (incumbent)	138,257	74.82
Republican	George W. G. Smith	46,510	25.17
No party	Scattering	24	0.01
Total votes		184,791	100.00
Turnout			
Democratic hold			

=== District 4 ===
California's 4th congressional district election, 1962
Party	Candidate	Votes	%
Democratic	Robert L. Leggett	55,563	56.50
Republican	L. V. Honsinger	42,762	43.48
No party	Scattering	20	0.02
Total votes		98,345	100.00
Turnout			
Democratic win (new seat)			

=== District 5 ===
California's 5th congressional district election, 1962
Party	Candidate	Votes	%
Democratic	John F. Shelley (incumbent)	64,493	80.44
Republican	Roland S. Charles	15,670	19.54
No party	Scattering	16	0.02
Total votes		80,179	100.00
Turnout			
Democratic hold			

=== District 6 ===
California's 6th congressional district election, 1962
Party	Candidate	Votes	%
Republican	William S. Mailliard (incumbent)	105,762	58.69
Democratic	John A. O'Connell	74,429	41.30
No party	Scattering	3	0.00
Total votes		180,194	100.00
Turnout			
Democratic hold			

=== District 7 ===
California's 7th congressional district election, 1962
Party	Candidate	Votes	%
Democratic	Jeffery Cohelan (incumbent)	86,215	64.48
Republican	Leonard L. Cantando	47,409	35.46
No party	Scattering	76	0.06
Total votes		133,700	100.00
Turnout			
Democratic hold			

=== District 8 ===
California's 8th congressional district election, 1962
Party	Candidate	Votes	%
Democratic	George P. Miller (incumbent)	97,014	72.49
Republican	Harold Petersen	36,810	27.51
No party	Scattering	3	0.00
Total votes		133,827	100.00
Turnout			
Democratic hold			

=== District 9 ===
California's 9th congressional district election, 1962
Party	Candidate	Votes	%
Democratic	Don Edwards	79,616	65.94
Republican	Joseph F. Donovan	41,104	34.04
No party	Scattering	24	0.02
Total votes		120,744	100.00
Turnout			
Democratic win (new seat)			

=== District 10 ===
California's 10th congressional district election, 1962
Party	Candidate	Votes	%
Republican	Charles S. Gubser (incumbent)	106,419	60.70
Democratic	James P. Thurber, Jr.	68,885	39.29
No party	Scattering	21	0.01
Total votes		175,325	100.00
Turnout			
Republican hold			

=== District 11 ===
California's 11th congressional district election, 1962
Party	Candidate	Votes	%
Republican	J. Arthur Younger (incumbent)	101,963	62.33
Democratic	John D. Kaster	61,623	37.67
No party	Scattering	5	0.00
Total votes		163,591	100.00
Turnout			
Republican hold			

=== District 12 ===
California's 12th congressional district election, 1962
Party	Candidate	Votes	%
Republican	Burt L. Talcott	75,424	61.31
Democratic	William K. Steward	47,576	38.67
No party	Scattering	26	0.02
Total votes		123,026	100.00
Turnout			
Republican win (new seat)			

=== District 13 ===
California's 13th congressional district election, 1962
Party	Candidate	Votes	%
Republican	Charles M. Teague (incumbent)	84,743	64.94
Democratic	George J. Holgate	45,746	35.05
No party	Scattering	12	0.01
Total votes		130,501	100.00
Turnout			
Republican hold			

=== District 14 ===
California's 14th congressional district election, 1962
Party	Candidate	Votes	%
Republican	John F. Baldwin, Jr. (incumbent)	99,040	62.88
Democratic	Charles R. Weidner	58,469	37.12
No party	Scattering	9	0.01
Total votes		157,518	100.00
Turnout			
Republican hold			

=== District 15 ===
California's 15th congressional district election, 1962
Party	Candidate	Votes	%
Democratic	John J. McFall (incumbent)	97,322	69.99
Republican	Clifford B. Bull	41,726	30.01
No party	Scattering	5	0.00
Total votes		139,053	100.00
Turnout			
Democratic hold			

=== District 16 ===
California's 16th congressional district election, 1962
Party	Candidate	Votes	%
Democratic	Bernice F. Sisk (incumbent)	108,339	71.87
Republican	Arthur L. Selland	42,401	28.13
No party	Scattering	11	0.01
Total votes		150,751	100.00
Turnout			
Democratic hold			

=== District 17 ===
California's 17th congressional district election, 1962
Party	Candidate	Votes	%
Democratic	Cecil R. King (incumbent)	74,964	67.15
Republican	Ted Bruinsma	36,663	32.84
No party	Scattering	5	0.00
Total votes		111,632	100.00
Turnout			
Democratic hold			

=== District 18 ===
California's 18th congressional district election, 1962
Party	Candidate	Votes	%
Democratic	Harlan Hagen (incumbent)	91,684	58.88
Republican	G. Ray Arnett	64,037	41.12
No party	Scattering	4	0.00
Total votes		155,725	100.00
Turnout			
Democratic hold			

=== District 19 ===
California's 19th congressional district election, 1962
Party	Candidate	Votes	%
Democratic	Chet Holifield (incumbent)	78,436	61.55
Republican	Robert T. Ramsay	48,976	38.43
No party	Scattering	21	0.02
Total votes		127,433	100.00
Turnout			
Democratic hold			

=== District 20 ===
California's 20th congressional district election, 1962
Party	Candidate	Votes	%
Republican	H. Allen Smith (incumbent)	119,938	70.63
Democratic	Leon Mayer	49,850	29.36
No party	Scattering	16	0.01
Total votes		169,804	100.00
Turnout			
Republican hold			

=== District 21 ===
California's 21st congressional district election, 1962
Party	Candidate	Votes	%
Democratic	Augustus F. Hawkins	73,465	84.54
Republican	Herman Smith	13,371	15.39
No party	Scattering	68	0.08
Total votes		86,904	100.00
Turnout			
Democratic win (new seat)			

=== District 22 ===
California's 22nd congressional district election, 1962
Party	Candidate	Votes	%
Democratic	James C. Corman (incumbent)	75,294	53.62
Republican	Charles S. Foote	65,087	46.35
No party	Scattering	33	0.02
Total votes		140,414	100.00
Turnout			
Democratic hold			

=== District 23 ===
California's 23rd congressional district election, 1962
Party	Candidate	Votes	%
Democratic	Clyde Doyle (incumbent)	83,269	64.17
Republican	Emmett A. Schwartz	46,488	35.82
No party	Scattering	12	0.01
Total votes		129,769	100.00
Turnout			
Democratic hold			

=== District 24 ===
California's 24th congressional district election, 1962
Party	Candidate	Votes	%
Republican	Glenard P. Lipscomb (incumbent)	120,884	70.33
Democratic	Knox Mellon	50,970	29.66
No party	Scattering	19	0.01
Total votes		171,873	100.00
Turnout			
Republican hold			

=== District 25 ===
California's 25th congressional district election, 1962
Party	Candidate	Votes	%
Democratic	Ronald B. Cameron	62,371	53.07
Republican	John H. Rousselot (incumbent)	53,961	45.91
No party	Scattering	1,192	1.01
Total votes		117,524	100.00
Turnout			
Democratic gain from Republican			

=== District 26 ===
California's 26th congressional district election, 1962
Party	Candidate	Votes	%
Democratic	James Roosevelt (incumbent)	112,162	68.29
Republican	Daniel Beltz	52,063	31.70
No party	Scattering	21	0.01
Total votes		164,246	100.00
Turnout			
Democratic hold			

=== District 27 ===
California's 27th congressional district election, 1962
Party	Candidate	Votes	%
Democratic	Everett G. Burkhalter	66,979	52.10
Republican	Edgar W. Hiestand (incumbent)	61,538	47.86
No party	Scattering	49	0.04
Total votes		128,566	100.00
Turnout			
Democratic gain from Republican			

=== District 28 ===
California's 28th congressional district election, 1962
Party	Candidate	Votes	%
Republican	Alphonzo E. Bell, Jr. (incumbent)	162,233	63.97
Democratic	Jerry Pacht	91,305	36.00
No party	Scattering	64	0.03
Total votes		253,602	100.00
Turnout			
Republican hold			

=== District 29 ===
California's 29th congressional district election, 1962
Party	Candidate	Votes	%
Democratic	George Brown, Jr.	73,740	55.64
Republican	H. L. Richardson, Jr.	58,760	44.34
No party	Scattering	27	0.02
Total votes		132,527	100.00
Turnout			
Democratic win (new seat)			

=== District 30 ===
California's 30th congressional district election, 1962
Party	Candidate	Votes	%
Democratic	Edward R. Roybal	69,008	56.50
Republican	Gordon L. McDonough (incumbent)	53,104	43.48
No party	Scattering	16	0.01
Total votes		122,128	100.00
Turnout			
Democratic gain from Republican			

=== District 31 ===
California's 31st congressional district election, 1962
Party	Candidate	Votes	%
Democratic	Charles H. Wilson	76,631	52.19
Republican	Gordon Hahn	70,154	47.78
No party	Scattering	35	0.02
Total votes		146,820	100.00
Turnout			
Democratic win (new seat)			

=== District 32 ===
California's 32nd congressional district election, 1962
Party	Candidate	Votes	%
Republican	Craig Hosmer (incumbent)	115,915	70.74
Democratic	J. J. Johovich	47,917	29.24
No party	Scattering	33	0.02
Total votes		163,865	100.00
Turnout			
Republican hold			

=== District 33 ===
California's 33rd congressional district election, 1962
Party	Candidate	Votes	%
Democratic	Harry R. Sheppard (incumbent)	96,192	59.02
Republican	William R. Thomas	66,764	40.97
No party	Scattering	18	0.01
Total votes		162,974	100.00
Turnout			
Democratic hold			

=== District 34 ===
California's 34th congressional district election, 1962
Party	Candidate	Votes	%
Democratic	Richard T. Hanna	90,758	55.94
Republican	Robert A. Geier	71,478	44.05
No party	Scattering	16	0.01
Total votes		162,252	100.00
Turnout			
Democratic win (new seat)			

=== District 35 ===
California's 35th congressional district election, 1962
Party	Candidate	Votes	%
Republican	James B. Utt (incumbent)	133,737	68.52
Democratic	Burton Shamsky	61,395	31.45
No party	Scattering	54	0.03
Total votes		195,186	100.00
Turnout			
Republican hold			

=== District 36 ===
California's 36th congressional district election, 1962
Party	Candidate	Votes	%
Republican	Bob Wilson (incumbent)	91,626	61.77
Democratic	William C. Godfrey	56,637	38.18
No party	Scattering	69	0.05
Total votes		148,332	100.00
Turnout			
Republican hold			

=== District 37 ===
California's 37th congressional district election, 1962
Party	Candidate	Votes	%
Democratic	Lionel Van Deerlin	63,821	51.32
Republican	Dick Wilson	60,460	48.62
No party	Scattering	70	0.06
Total votes		124,351	100.00
Turnout			
Democratic win (new seat)			

=== District 38 ===
California's 38th congressional district election, 1962
Party	Candidate	Votes	%
Republican	Patrick M. Martin	68,583	55.92
Democratic	Dalip Singh Saund (incumbent)	54,022	44.05
No party	Scattering	30	0.02
Total votes		122,605	100.00
Turnout			
Republican gain from Democratic			

== See also ==
- 88th United States Congress
- Political party strength in California
- Political party strength in U.S. states
- 1962 United States House of Representatives elections
