= 1980 United States House of Representatives elections in California =

- November 4, 1980

All 43 California seats to the United States House of Representatives
	Majority party	Minority party
Party	Democratic	Republican
Last election	26	17
Seats won	22	21
Seat change	▼4	▲4
Popular vote	3,664,614	4,176,462
Percentage	44.82%	51.08%
- Republican gain Democratic hold Republican hold

The United States House of Representatives elections in California, 1980 was an election for California's delegation to the United States House of Representatives, which occurred as part of the general election of the House of Representatives on November 4, 1980. Republicans lost one seat (which they had won in a special election) but gained four Democratic-held seats.

== Overview ==
United States House of Representatives elections in California, 1980
Party	Votes	%	Before	After	+/–
Republican	4,176,462	51.08%	17	20	+4
Democratic	3,664,614	44.82%	26	23	-4
Libertarian	272,728	3.34%	0	0	0
Peace and Freedom	48,479	0.59%	0	0	0
American Independent	13,335	0.16%	0	0	0
Totals	8,175,618	100.00%	43	43	—

== Results ==
Final results from the Clerk of the House of Representatives:

=== District 1 ===
California's 1st congressional district election, 1980
Party	Candidate	Votes	%
Republican	Eugene A. Chappie	145,098	53.70
Democratic	Harold T. Johnson (incumbent)	107,682	39.85
Libertarian	Jim McClarin	17,419	6.45
Total votes		270,199	100.00
Turnout			
Republican gain from Democratic			

=== District 2 ===
California's 2nd congressional district election, 1980
Party	Candidate	Votes	%
Republican	Donald H. Clausen (incumbent)	141,698	54.15
Democratic	Norma K. Bork	109,789	41.96
Libertarian	Daniel Mosier	6,833	2.61
Peace and Freedom	Linda D. Wren	3,354	1.28
Total votes		261,674	100.00
Turnout			
Republican hold			

=== District 3 ===
California's 3rd congressional district election, 1980
Party	Candidate	Votes	%
Democratic	Robert Matsui (incumbent)	170,670	70.56
Republican	Joseph Murphy	64,215	26.55
Libertarian	Bruce A. Daniel	6,980	2.89
Total votes		241,865	100.00
Turnout			
Democratic hold			

=== District 4 ===
California's 4th congressional district election, 1980
Party	Candidate	Votes	%
Democratic	Vic Fazio (incumbent)	133,853	65.28
Republican	Albert Dehr	60,935	29.72
Libertarian	Robert J. Burnside	10,267	5.01
Total votes		205,055	100.00
Turnout			
Democratic hold			

=== District 5 ===
California's 5th congressional district election, 1980
Party	Candidate	Votes	%
Democratic	John L. Burton (incumbent)	101,105	51.11
Republican	Dennis McQuaid	89,624	45.31
Libertarian	Dan P. Dougherty	7,092	3.59
Total votes		197,821	100.00
Turnout			
Democratic hold			

=== District 6 ===
California's 6th congressional district election, 1980
Party	Candidate	Votes	%
Democratic	Phillip Burton (incumbent)	93,400	69.37
Republican	Tom Spinosa	34,500	25.62
Libertarian	Roy Childs	6,750	5.01
Total votes		134,650	100.00
Turnout			
Democratic hold			

=== District 7 ===
California's 7th congressional district election, 1980
Party	Candidate	Votes	%
Democratic	George Miller (incumbent)	142,044	63.28
Republican	Giles St. Clair	70,479	31.40
Libertarian	Steve Snow	6,923	3.08
American Independent	Thomas J. Thompson	5,023	2.24
Total votes		224,469	100.00
Turnout			
Democratic hold			

=== District 8 ===
California's 8th congressional district election, 1980
Party	Candidate	Votes	%
Democratic	Ronald Dellums (incumbent)	108,380	55.46
Republican	Charles V. Hughes	76,580	39.19
Libertarian	Tod Mikuriya	10,465	5.35
Total votes		195,425	100.00
Turnout			
Democratic hold			

=== District 9 ===
California's 9th congressional district election, 1980
Party	Candidate	Votes	%
Democratic	Pete Stark (incumbent)	90,504	55.32
Republican	William J. "Bill" Kennedy	67,265	41.12
Libertarian	Steven W. Clanin	5,823	3.56
Total votes		163,592	100.00
Turnout			
Democratic hold			

=== District 10 ===
California's 10th congressional district election, 1980
Party	Candidate	Votes	%
Democratic	Don Edwards (incumbent)	102,231	62.13
Republican	Joseph M. Lutton	45,987	27.95
Libertarian	Joseph Fuhrig	11,904	7.23
American Independent	Edmon V. Kaiser	4,421	2.69
Total votes		164,543	100.00
Turnout			
Democratic hold			

=== District 11 ===
California's 11th congressional district election, 1980
Party	Candidate	Votes	%
Democratic	Tom Lantos	85,823	46.39
Republican	William Royer (incumbent)	80,100	43.29
Peace and Freedom	Wilson G. Branch	13,723	7.42
Libertarian	William S. Wade Jr.	3,816	2.06
American Independent	Nicholas W. Kudrovzeff	1,550	0.84
Total votes		185,012	100.00
Turnout			
Democratic hold			

Leo Ryan, a Democrat, had been elected in the 1978 election, but was assassinated on November 18, 1978. William Royer was elected to finish Ryan's term.

=== District 12 ===
California's 12th congressional district election, 1980
Party	Candidate	Votes	%
Republican	Pete McCloskey (incumbent)	143,817	72.24
Democratic	Kirsten Olsen	37,009	18.59
Libertarian	Bill Evers	15,073	7.57
Peace and Freedom	Adele Fumino	3,184	1.60
Total votes		199,083	100.00
Turnout			
Republican hold			

=== District 13 ===
California's 13th congressional district election, 1980
Party	Candidate	Votes	%
Democratic	Norm Mineta (incumbent)	132,246	58.88
Republican	W. E. "Ted" Gagne	79,766	35.51
Libertarian	Ray Strong	8,806	3.92
Peace and Freedom	Robert Goldsborough	3,791	1.69
Total votes		224,609	100.00
Turnout			
Democratic hold			

=== District 14 ===
California's 14th congressional district election, 1980
Party	Candidate	Votes	%
Republican	Norman D. Shumway (incumbent)	133,979	60.74
Democratic	Ann Cerney	79,883	36.22
Libertarian	Douglas G. Housley	6,717	3.05
Total votes		220,579	100.00
Turnout			
Republican hold			

=== District 15 ===
California's 15th congressional district election, 1980
Party	Candidate	Votes	%
Democratic	Tony Coelho (incumbent)	108,072	71.81
Republican	Ron Schwartz	37,895	25.18
Libertarian	Michael L. Pullen	4,524	3.01
Total votes		150,491	100.00
Turnout			
Democratic hold			

=== District 16 ===
California's 16th congressional district election, 1980
Party	Candidate	Votes	%
Democratic	Leon Panetta (incumbent)	158,360	71.00
Republican	W. A. "Jack" Roth	54,675	24.51
Libertarian	Kenton H. Bowers	6,802	3.05
Peace and Freedom	D. Jeff Mauro	3,198	1.43
Total votes		223,035	100.00
Turnout			
Democratic hold			

=== District 17 ===
California's 17th congressional district election, 1980
Party	Candidate	Votes	%
Republican	Charles (Chip) Pashayan (inc.)	129,159	70.60
Democratic	Willard H. "Bill" Johnson	53,780	29.40
Total votes		182,939	100.00
Turnout			
Republican hold			

=== District 18 ===
California's 18th congressional district election, 1980
Party	Candidate	Votes	%
Republican	Bill Thomas (incumbent)	126,046	71.03
Democratic	Mary Pat Timmermans	51,415	28.97
Total votes		177,461	100.00
Turnout			
Republican hold			

=== District 19 ===
California's 19th congressional district election, 1980
Party	Candidate	Votes	%
Republican	Bob Lagomarsino (incumbent)	162,849	77.69
Democratic	Carmen Lodise	36,990	17.65
Libertarian	Jim Trotter	9,764	4.66
Total votes		209,603	100.00
Turnout			
Republican hold			

=== District 20 ===
California's 20th congressional district election, 1980
Party	Candidate	Votes	%
Republican	Barry Goldwater, Jr. (incumbent)	199,674	78.83
Democratic	Matt Miller	43,024	16.99
Libertarian	Christopher R. Darwin	10,605	4.19
Total votes		253,303	100.00
Turnout			
Republican hold			

=== District 21 ===
California's 21st congressional district election, 1980
Party	Candidate	Votes	%
Republican	Bobbi Fiedler	74,674	48.68
Democratic	James C. Corman (incumbent)	73,898	48.17
Libertarian	George J. Lehmann	2,790	1.82
Peace and Freedom	Jan B. Tucker	2,038	1.33
Total votes		153,400	100.00
Turnout			
Republican gain from Democratic			

=== District 22 ===
California's 22nd congressional district election, 1980
Party	Candidate	Votes	%
Republican	Carlos J. Moorhead (incumbent)	115,241	63.87
Democratic	Pierce O'Donnell	57,477	31.86
Libertarian	William V. Susel	7,705	4.27
Total votes		180,423	100.00
Turnout			
Republican hold			

=== District 23 ===
California's 23rd congressional district election, 1980
Party	Candidate	Votes	%
Democratic	Anthony C. Beilenson (incumbent)	126,020	63.20
Republican	Robert "Bob" Winckler	62,742	31.47
Libertarian	Jeffrey P. Lieb	10,623	5.33
Total votes		199,385	100.00
Turnout			
Democratic hold			

=== District 24 ===
California's 24th congressional district election, 1980
Party	Candidate	Votes	%
Democratic	Henry Waxman (incumbent)	93,569	63.77
Republican	Roland Cayard	39,744	27.09
Peace and Freedom	Margaret "Maggie" Feigin	5,905	4.02
Libertarian	Robert E. Lehman	5,172	3.52
American Independent	Jack Smilowitz	2,341	1.60
Total votes		146,731	100.00
Turnout			
Democratic hold			

=== District 25 ===
California's 25th congressional district election, 1980
Party	Candidate	Votes	%
Democratic	Edward R. Roybal (incumbent)	49,080	66.00
Republican	Richard E. Ferraro	21,116	28.40
Libertarian	William D. Mitchell	4,169	5.61
Total votes		74,365	100.00
Turnout			
Democratic hold			

=== District 26 ===
California's 26th congressional district election, 1980
Party	Candidate	Votes	%
Republican	John H. Rousselot (incumbent)	116,715	70.95
Democratic	Joseph Louis Lisoni	40,099	24.37
Libertarian	William "B. J." Wagener	7,700	4.68
Total votes		164,514	100.00
Turnout			
Democratic hold			

=== District 27 ===
California's 27th congressional district election, 1980
Party	Candidate	Votes	%
Republican	Bob Dornan (incumbent)	109,807	51.00
Democratic	Carey Peck	100,061	46.47
Libertarian	Jerome L. "Jerry" Sievers	5,448	2.53
Total votes		215,316	100.00
Turnout			
Republican hold			

=== District 28 ===
California's 28th congressional district election, 1980
Party	Candidate	Votes	%
Democratic	Julian C. Dixon (incumbent)	108,725	79.19
Republican	Robert Reid	23,179	16.88
Libertarian	Ernst F. Ghermann	5,400	3.93
Total votes		137,304	100.00
Turnout			
Democratic hold			

=== District 29 ===
California's 29th congressional district election, 1980
Party	Candidate	Votes	%
Democratic	Augustus F. Hawkins (incumbent)	80,095	86.12
Republican	Michael Arthur Hirt	10,282	11.06
Libertarian	Earl Smith	2,622	2.82
Total votes		92,999	100.00
Turnout			
Democratic hold			

=== District 30 ===
California's 30th congressional district election, 1980
Party	Candidate	Votes	%
Democratic	George E. Danielson (incumbent)	74,119	72.15
Republican	J. Arthur "Art" Platten	24,136	23.49
Libertarian	Bruce M. Hobbs	4,480	4.36
Total votes		102,735	100.00
Turnout			
Democratic hold			

=== District 31 ===
California's 31st congressional district election, 1980
Party	Candidate	Votes	%
Democratic	Mervyn M. Dymally	69,146	64.41
Republican	Don Grimshaw	38,203	35.59
Total votes		107,349	100.00
Turnout			
Democratic hold			

=== District 32 ===
California's 32nd congressional district election, 1980
Party	Candidate	Votes	%
Democratic	Glenn M. Anderson (incumbent)	84,057	65.91
Republican	John R. Adler	39,260	30.79
Libertarian	Thomas A. Cosgrove	4,209	3.30
Total votes		127,526	100.00
Turnout			
Democratic hold			

=== District 33 ===
California's 33rd congressional district election, 1980
Party	Candidate	Votes	%
Republican	Wayne R. Grisham (incumbent)	122,439	70.85
Democratic	Fred L. Anderson	50,365	29.15
Total votes		172,804	100.00
Turnout			
Republican hold			

=== District 34 ===
California's 34th congressional district election, 1980
Party	Candidate	Votes	%
Republican	Dan Lungren (incumbent)	138,024	71.82
Democratic	Simone	46,351	24.12
Peace and Freedom	John S. Donohue	7,794	4.06
Total votes		192,169	100.00
Turnout			
Republican hold			

=== District 35 ===
California's 35th congressional district election, 1980
Party	Candidate	Votes	%
Republican	David Dreier	100,743	51.79
Democratic	James F. Lloyd (incumbent)	88,279	45.38
Peace and Freedom	James Michael "Mike" Noonan	5,492	2.82
Total votes		194,514	100.00
Turnout			
Republican gain from Democratic			

=== District 36 ===
California's 36th congressional district election, 1980
Party	Candidate	Votes	%
Democratic	George Brown, Jr. (incumbent)	88,628	52.54
Republican	John Paul Stark	73,247	43.42
Libertarian	Harry J. Histen	6,815	4.04
Total votes		168,690	100.00
Turnout			
Democratic hold			

=== District 37 ===
California's 37th congressional district election, 1980
Party	Candidate	Votes	%
Republican	Jerry Lewis (incumbent)	165,371	71.57
Democratic	Donald M. "Don" Rusk	58,091	25.14
Libertarian	Larry Morris	7,615	3.30
Total votes		231,077	100.00
Turnout			
Republican hold			

=== District 38 ===
California's 38th congressional district election, 1980
Party	Candidate	Votes	%
Democratic	Jerry M. Patterson (incumbent)	91,880	55.54
Republican	Art Jacobson	66,256	40.05
Libertarian	Charles E. "Chuck" Heiser	7,301	4.41
Total votes		165,437	100.00
Turnout			
Democratic hold			

=== District 39 ===
California's 39th congressional district election, 1980
Party	Candidate	Votes	%
Republican	William E. Dannemeyer (incumbent)	175,228	76.27
Democratic	Leonard L. Lahtinen	54,504	23.73
Total votes		229,732	100.00
Turnout			
Republican hold			

=== District 40 ===
California's 40th congressional district election, 1980
Party	Candidate	Votes	%
Republican	Robert Badham (incumbent)	213,999	70.16
Democratic	Michael F. Dow	66,512	21.81
Libertarian	Dan Mahaffey	24,486	8.03
Total votes		304,997	100.00
Turnout			
Republican hold			

=== District 41 ===
California's 41st congressional district election, 1980
Party	Candidate	Votes	%
Republican	Bill Lowery	123,187	52.66
Democratic	Bob Wilson	101,101	43.22
Libertarian	Joseph D. Alldredge	9,630	4.12
Total votes		233,918	100.00
Turnout			
Republican hold			

=== District 42 ===
California's 42nd congressional district election, 1980
Party	Candidate	Votes	%
Republican	Duncan Hunter	79,713	53.27
Democratic	Lionel Van Deerlin (incumbent)	69,936	46.73
Total votes		149,649	100.00
Turnout			
Republican gain from Democratic			

=== District 43 ===
California's 43rd congressional district election, 1980
Party	Candidate	Votes	%
Republican	Clair Burgener (incumbent)	298,815	86.57
Democratic	Tom Metzger	46,361	13.43
Total votes		345,176	100.00
Turnout			
Republican hold			

== See also ==
- 97th United States Congress
- Political party strength in California
- Political party strength in U.S. states
- 1980 United States House of Representatives elections
