= Senator Cameron =

Senator Cameron may refer to:

== Members of the United States Senate ==
- Angus Cameron (American politician) (1826–1897), U.S. Senator from Wisconsin from 1875 to 1885
- J. Donald Cameron (1833–1918), U.S. Senator from Pennsylvania from 1877 to 1897
- Ralph H. Cameron (1863–1953), U.S. Senator from Arizona from 1921 to 1927
- Simon Cameron (1799–1889), U.S. Senator from Pennsylvania from 1867 to 1877

== United States state senate members ==
- Dean Cameron (politician) (born 1961), Idaho State Senate
- Howard W. Cameron (1915–1986), Wisconsin State Senate
- Ronald G. Cameron (1917–2004), California State Senate
