= Douglas Bosco =

American politician

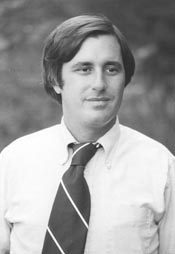
- Bosco, c. 1978

Member of the U.S. House of Representatives from California's 1st district
- In office January 3, 1983 – January 3, 1991
- Preceded by: Donald H. Clausen (redistricted)
- Succeeded by: Frank Riggs

Member of the California State Assembly from the 2nd district
- In office December 4, 1978 – December 6, 1982
- Preceded by: Barry Keene
- Succeeded by: Dan Hauser

Personal details
- Born: Douglas Harry Bosco; July 28, 1946 (age 80) New York City, New York, U.S.
- Party: Democratic
- Spouse: Gayle Guynup
- Education: Willamette University (BA, JD)

Douglas Harry Bosco (born July 28, 1946) is an American lawyer, politician, and newspaper owner from California. He is a former U.S. representative, serving four terms as a Democrat from 1983 to 1991.

== Early life ==
Born in Brooklyn, New York, Bosco attended Fremont High School in Sunnyvale, California. He graduated from the Capitol Page School in Washington, D.C. in 1963, received a B.A. from Willamette University in 1968 and a J.D. from the Willamette University College of Law in 1971. Bosco was admitted to the California bar in 1971 and commenced practice in San Rafael. He served as director of the California Department of Human Relations in 1973, and became executive director of the Marin County (California) Housing Authority in 1974.

== Political career ==
=== California State Assembly (1978-82) ===
Bosco was elected to the California State Assembly in 1978 and was re-elected in 1980. In 1979 he wrote, with then-governor Jerry Brown, the Renewable Resources Investment Act, which set up a state fund to protect fisheries, forests, urban forests and the coastline. He served as a delegate to the 1980 Democratic National Convention and to the California Democratic State Convention in 1982.

=== United States House of Representatives (1983-91) ===
In 1982 Bosco won the Democratic nomination for California's 1st congressional district, which had been renumbered from the 2nd District after redistricting. Then, in a major upset, he defeated 20-year Republican incumbent Donald H. Clausen by just over two points. In Congress Bosco, an advocate of fishery and natural resource conservation, authored the California Wilderness Act and the Smith River National Recreation Area Act. In 1989, along with Barbara Boxer and Nancy Pelosi, Bosco co-authored legislation to preserve the Cordell Bank National Marine Sanctuary, protecting the coast of northern California from offshore oil drilling.

Bosco went on to serve four terms in the House, but lost in 1990 by 42%-43% (with 15% to a Peace and Freedom Party candidate) to Republican Frank D. Riggs, who in turn was defeated for re-election in 1992 by Democrat Daniel E. Hamburg. In 1994, Bosco attempted a comeback to his congressional seat by challenging Hamburg in the primary, but lost by 38%-62%. Hamburg went on to lose the general election to Riggs in a rematch, 47%-53%.

== Post-political career ==
Bosco continues to be influential in state and local politics. He serves as chairman of the California State Coastal Conservancy, preserving public access to California's coastline.

In 2012, Bosco became a part-owner of the local newspaper in Santa Rosa, California, The Press Democrat. Formerly a resident of Occidental, California, Bosco currently resides with his family in Santa Rosa.

== Electoral history ==
1982 United States House of Representatives elections
Party	Candidate	Votes	%
Democratic	Douglas H. Bosco	107,749	49.8
Republican	Donald H. Clausen (Incumbent)	102,043	47.2
Libertarian	David Redick	6,374	2.9
Total votes		216,166	100.0
Turnout			
Democratic gain from Republican			

1984 United States House of Representatives elections
Party	Candidate	Votes	%
Democratic	Douglas H. Bosco (Incumbent)	157,037	62.3
Republican	Floyd G. Sampson	95,186	37.7
Total votes		252,223	100.0
Turnout			
Democratic hold			

1986 United States House of Representatives elections
Party	Candidate	Votes	%
Democratic	Douglas H. Bosco (Incumbent)	138,174	67.5
Republican	Floyd G. Sampson	54,436	26.6
Peace and Freedom	Elden McFarland	12,149	5.9
Total votes		204,759	100.0
Turnout			
Democratic hold			

1988 United States House of Representatives elections
Party	Candidate	Votes	%
Democratic	Douglas H. Bosco (Incumbent)	159,815	62.9
Republican	Samuel "Mark" Vanderbilt	72,189	28.4
Peace and Freedom	Eric Fried	22,150	8.7
Total votes		254,154	100.0
Turnout			
Democratic hold			

1990 United States House of Representatives elections
Party	Candidate	Votes	%
Republican	Frank Riggs	99,782	43.3
Democratic	Douglas H. Bosco (Incumbent)	96,468	41.9
Peace and Freedom	Darlene G. Comingore	34,011	14.8
Total votes		230,261	100.0
Turnout			
Republican gain from Democratic			

== Sources ==
- United States Congress. "Douglas Bosco (id: B000648)". Biographical Directory of the United States Congress.
- Appearances on C-SPAN

U.S. House of Representatives
Preceded by Eugene A. Chappie	Member of the U.S. House of Representatives from California's 1st congressional district 1983–1991	Succeeded by Frank Riggs
U.S. order of precedence (ceremonial)
Preceded by Jim Bates as Former U.S. Representative	Order of precedence of the United States as Former U.S. Representative	Succeeded by Dennis Cardoza as Former U.S. Representative
