= Frank Riggs =

American politician (1950–2023)

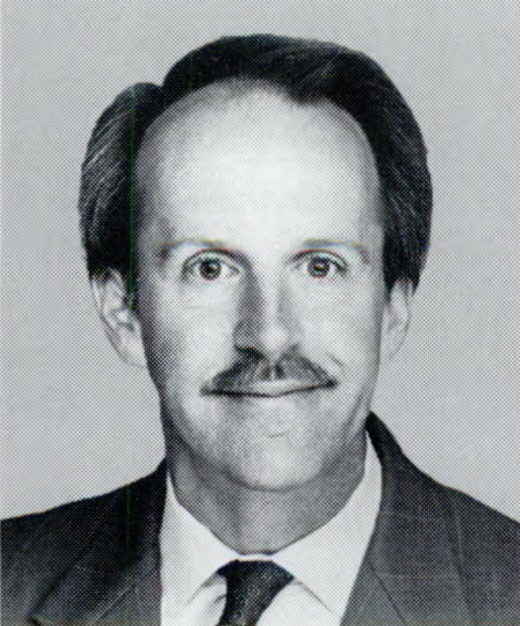
- Official portrait, 1997

Member of the U.S. House of Representatives from California's 1st district
- In office January 3, 1995 – January 3, 1999
- Preceded by: Daniel Hamburg
- Succeeded by: Mike Thompson
- In office January 3, 1991 – January 3, 1993
- Preceded by: Douglas Bosco
- Succeeded by: Daniel Hamburg

Personal details
- Born: Frank Duncan Riggs; September 5, 1950 Louisville, Kentucky, U.S.
- Died: December 20, 2023 (aged 73) Arizona, U.S.
- Party: Republican
- Education: Golden Gate University (BA)

Military service
- Allegiance: United States
- Branch/service: United States Army
- Years of service: 1972–1975

Frank Duncan Riggs (September 5, 1950 – December 20, 2023) was an American U.S. army veteran, law enforcement officer, charter school executive, and Republican politician from the states of California and Arizona. He served three terms in the U.S. House of Representatives during the 1990s.

== Early life ==
Frank Riggs was born in Louisville, Kentucky, on September 5, 1950. He served in the United States Army from 1972 to 1975.

== Career ==
An Army veteran, having served as a Military Police officer, Riggs worked as a police officer and deputy sheriff in Santa Barbara, California, and Sonoma County, respectively. He was a member of the Windsor Unified School District Board of Trustees from 1984 to 1988 and was a real estate executive and owner of his own development company for over 20 years.

In 1999, Riggs joined the board of the Charter Schools Development Corporation, and served with CSDC until 2012. During his service, CSDC went from being a start-up nonprofit to a national leader in financing and developing educational facilities for charter schools, reaching $125 million in assets, and procuring and leveraging private capital for facility acquisitions and improvements worth $680 million; representing over four million square feet of facilities for 235 charter schools in 25 states.

In 2001, he moved to Arizona. He served as CEO of ABS School Services of Phoenix, which provides financial accounting and business management services to approximately 200 school district charter, private, and federal grant schools. Riggs was also the founding board president for Arizona Connections Academy, a statewide on-line charter school. He resided in Scottsdale, Arizona for 14 years.

=== California congressman ===
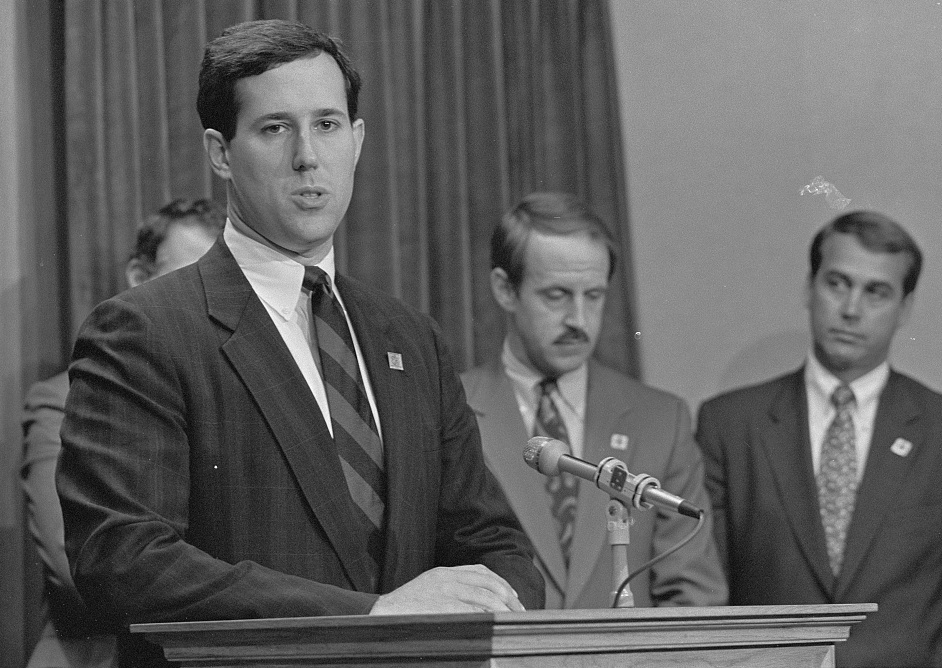
Riggs (center) with Rick Santorum (speaking) and John Boehner in 1991.

Riggs was elected to the United States House of Representatives as a Republican in 1990 from California's 1st District, narrowly defeating four-term Democrat Doug Bosco. He represented the area stretching from Napa County to the northern Pacific coast. He served in the 102nd, 104th, and 105th Congresses. During his service, he was on the House Appropriations Committee (including the Agriculture and the Energy and Water Development Subcommittees), the House Transportation and Public Works Committee, and the House Banking and Financial Affairs Committee.

Riggs also served on the House Education and Workforce Committee and chaired the Subcommittee on Early Childhood, Youth and Families in the 105th Congress. In that capacity, he authored the Charter School Expansion Act (signed into law by President Bill Clinton in October, 1998) which provides federal start-up grants to newly formed charter schools to help defray their initial operating expenses. Most Arizona charter schools have received federal start-up grants as a result of Riggs's legislation.

Riggs voted against the Gulf War resolution and, as a member of the Gang of Seven, a group of freshman Republican congressmen, favored identifying publicly the congressmen who made overdrafts at the House Bank. He was defeated in 1992 by Democrat Dan Hamburg but won a rematch in 1994.

In 1996, he won re-election over Democrat Michela Alioto-Pier by about four percentage points.

=== California U.S. Senate campaign ===
In 1998, Riggs faced a potentially competitive contest against State Senator Mike Thompson, who was due to be termed out of his seat. Thompson's state senate district was virtually coextensive with the congressional district. Riggs decided not to run for re-election. Instead, he ran for the Republican nomination for the United States Senate. A late entrant, he dropped out of the race before Election Day but still finished in fifth place (the fourth place Republican) in the state's open primary system. The nomination was won by State Treasurer Matt Fong, who went on to lose the general election to Barbara Boxer, seeking her second term in the Senate. Meanwhile, Thompson easily won the congressional race.

=== Arizona campaigns ===
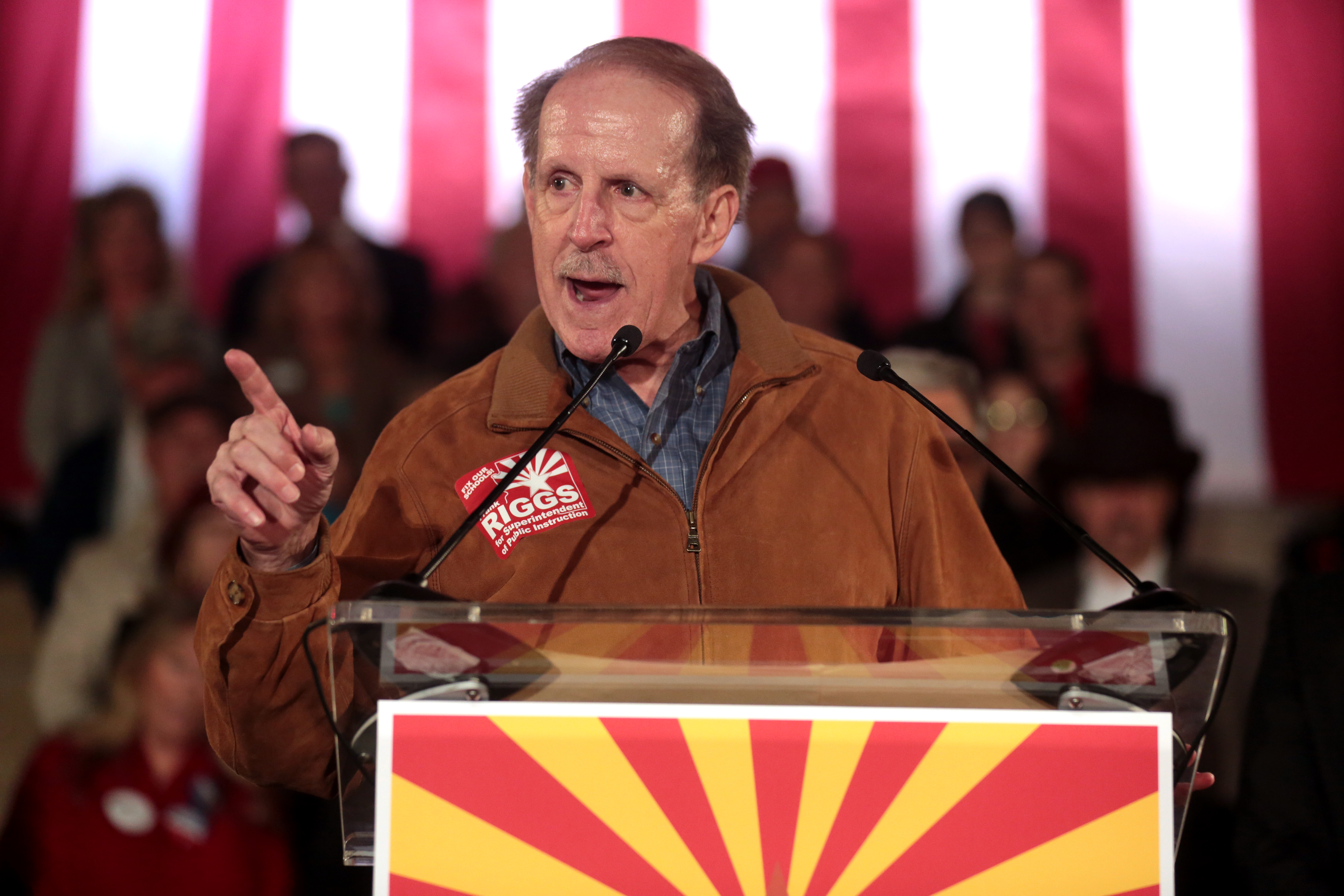
Riggs during his campaign for Arizona Superintendent of Public Instruction, 2018.

In 2005, he explored a run for governor, as most Arizona Republicans were deciding not to challenge popular Governor Janet Napolitano for reelection the following year. However, he discovered that he had to be a five-year resident of Arizona in order to run for governor.

In 2014, he unsuccessfully sought the Republican nomination for Governor of Arizona, finishing last in the Republican primary with less than five percent of the vote.

In 2016, Riggs created an exploratory candidacy for the Arizona Corporation Commission, but ultimately did not run for the position.

=== Arizona Superintendent of Public Instruction campaign ===
In the 2018 Arizona Republican primary election, Riggs ran for state Superintendent of Public Instruction against college professor Dr. Bob Branch, incumbent Diane Douglas, former Basis Charter Schools Director of Charter School Development Jonathan Gelbart, and former public school teacher Tracy Livingston. A week after the election in which Riggs traded the lead with Dr. Branch several times, Riggs came out ahead by only 249 votes. However, he lost the race to Democrat Kathy Hoffman in the November 6, 2018, general election.

== Death ==
Riggs died in Arizona on December 20, 2023, at the age of 73.

== Congressional electoral history ==
1990 United States House of Representatives elections
Party	Candidate	Votes	%
Republican	Frank Riggs	99,782	43.3
Democratic	Douglas H. Bosco (Incumbent)	96,468	41.9
Peace and Freedom	Darlene G. Comingore	34,011	14.8
Total votes		230,261	100.0
Turnout			
Republican gain from Democratic			

1992 United States House of Representatives elections
Party	Candidate	Votes	%
Democratic	Dan Hamburg	119,676	47.6
Republican	Frank Riggs (Incumbent)	113,266	45.1
Peace and Freedom	Phil Baldwin	10,764	4.3
Libertarian	Matthew L. Howard	7,500	3.0
Total votes		251,206	100.0
Turnout			
Democratic gain from Republican			

1994 United States House of Representatives elections
Party	Candidate	Votes	%
Republican	Frank Riggs	106,870	53.3
Democratic	Dan Hamburg (Incumbent)	93,717	46.7
No party	Chase (write-in)	86	0.0
Total votes		200,673	100.0
Turnout			
Republican gain from Democratic			

1996 United States House of Representatives elections
Party	Candidate	Votes	%
Republican	Frank Riggs (Incumbent)	110,242	49.7
Democratic	Michela Alioto	96,522	43.4
Libertarian	Emil Rossi	15,354	6.9
Total votes		222,118	100.0
Turnout			
Republican hold			

1998 California Republican U.S. Senate primary
Party	Candidate	Votes	%
Republican	Matt Fong	1,292,662	45.28%
Republican	Darrell Issa	1,142,567	40.02%
Republican	Frank Riggs	295,886	10.36%
Republican	John M. Brown	48,941	1.71%
Republican	Mark Raus	45,480	1.59%
Republican	Linh Dao	29,241	1.02%
Total votes	2,854,777	100.00%	

U.S. House of Representatives
Preceded by Douglas Bosco	Member of the U.S. House of Representatives from California's 1st congressional district 1991–1993	Succeeded by Daniel Hamburg
Preceded by Daniel Hamburg	Member of the U.S. House of Representatives from California's 1st congressional district 1995–1999	Succeeded by Mike Thompson
