= Paul J. Lunardi =

American politician

Member of the California Senate from the 7th district
- In office December 6, 1963 - January 2, 1967
- Preceded by: Ronald G. Cameron
- Succeeded by: George Miller Jr.

Member of the California State Assembly from the 6th district
- In office January 5, 1959 - December 6, 1963
- Preceded by: Francis C. Lindsay
- Succeeded by: Eugene Chappie

Personal details
- Born: September 30, 1921 Roseville, California, U.S.
- Died: January 11, 2013 (aged 91)
- Party: Democratic
- Spouse(s): Lou Lunardi, "Gerry" Geraldine F. (Nee Shirley) Lunardi
- Children: 1 son, 3 daughters
- Education: Roseville High School
- Occupation: Politician

Military service
- Branch/service: United States Coast Guard
- Battles/wars: World War II

Paul J. Lunardi (September 30, 1921 - January 11, 2013) was an American politician.

== Early life ==
On September 30, 1921, Lunardi was born in Roseville, California. He served in the United States Coast Guard during World War II. Lunardi graduated from Roseville High School.

== Career ==
In 1950, Lunardi's career began as a city council member of Roseville, California. He was a Democrat. Lunardi was elected as the mayor of his hometown of Roseville in 1954. He served as a member of the California State Assembly from 1959 to 1963 and a State Senator from 1963 to 1967. Under his tenure, he designated the ghost town of Bodie, California as a State Historic Park.

== Personal life ==
In 1948, Lunardi married Geraldine F. Shirley. Lunardi has three children, Herman, Yvonne and Nancy.

On January 11, 2013, Lunardi died.
