= Jim McClarin =

American activist and politician (born 1945 or 1946)

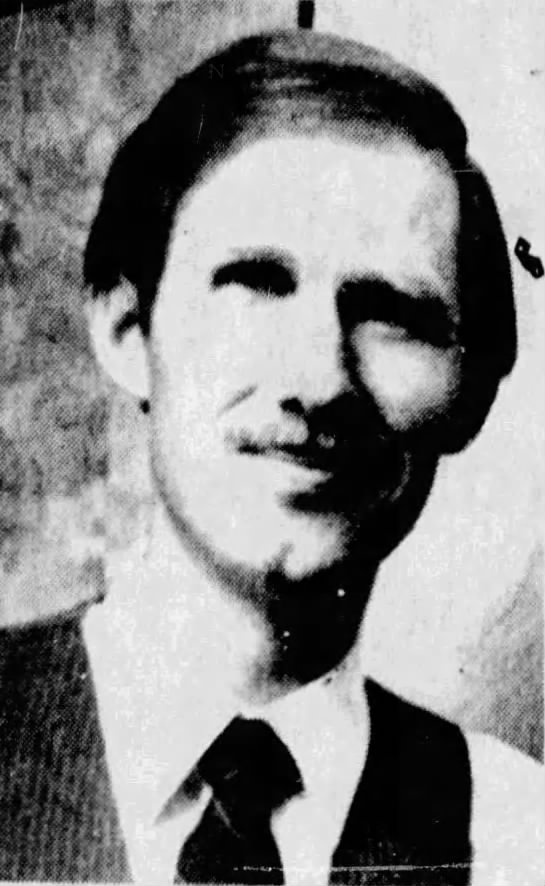
- McClarin in 1984

Member of the New Hampshire House of Representatives for the Hillsborough 33 district
- In office December 7, 1994 – February 3, 1995

Executive Director of the Placer County Libertarian Party
- In office 1983–1985

Chairman of the Nevada County Libertarian Party
- In office 1979–?

Personal details
- Born: 1945 or 1946 (age 80–81) New York, U.S.
- Party: Libertarian Party
- Education: American River College (AA); Humboldt State University (attended)

Jim McClarin (born 1945 or 1946) is an American energy consultant, libertarian activist, and politician. A member of the Libertarian Party, he served in the New Hampshire House of Representatives from December 1994 until February 1995. Prior to this, he was a prominent party organizer in California, serving as chairman of the Nevada County Libertarian Party and executive director of the Placer County Libertarian Party in the 1970s and 1980s.

== Early life and education ==
Jim McClarin was born in 1945 or 1946 in New York, and moved to Sacramento, California, in 1959. After receiving his associate's degree in math and science from American River College, he began studying zoology at Humboldt State University. McClarin was a "self-described college liberal on food stamps – a war protester with long hair and a beard", and held civil libertarian beliefs.

After three-and-a-half years at Humboldt State, McClarin dropped out in 1968 to become a Bigfoot researcher. Recognized by The Sacramento Bee as "a leading Bigfoot expert", he approached Bigfoot research from a scientific perspective. McClarin questioned the usefulness of the Patterson–Gimlin film, and led an expedition to the Klamath River valley in 1969. He abandoned Bigfoot hunting in 1971, arguing that "if Bigfoot had managed to elude his captors that long, he could continue doing it."

In the early 1970s, McClarin worked at a factory in Sacramento before moving to Nevada City, where he became a construction and energy consultant, giving seminars regarding energy-efficient underground homes. During this period, he became interested in politics after listening to KZAP radio hosts discuss economic issues. Initially, he read literature by the John Birch Society, but was dissatisfied by "their basic attitude that there were Communists under every bed." In 1975, McClarin discovered the Libertarian Party and began attending local meetings in Nevada County. In 1979, he became the chairman of the Nevada County Libertarian Party.

== Political career ==
=== California ===
On January 2, 1980, McClarin declared his candidacy for California's 1st congressional district as a Libertarian, challenging longtime Democratic incumbent Bizz Johnson. Also in the race was Eugene A. Chappie, a state assemblyman who became the Republican nominee. McClarin ran an atypical campaign, selling his car for additional campaign funds and hitchhiking throughout the large fourteen-county district. Early in his campaign, in protest of the resumption of Selective Service System registration, McClarin burned his draft card as a symbolic gesture. He won the Libertarian Party primary, receiving 495 votes.

McClarin campaigned on a traditional Libertarian platform, advocating for "massive tax and government cuts". He supported proposals to abolish the Department of Energy and the Department of Education, eliminate the federal minimum wage, and argued that taxation is theft and that roads should be privately owned. He also advocated for the deregulation of the energy market, arguing against the Price–Anderson Nuclear Industries Indemnity Act and a recently passed windfall tax bill on the oil industry. He also held non-interventionist positions on foreign policy, supporting the closure of American military bases in foreign countries and a transition towards an all volunteer military.

McClarin attempted to unite a broad coalition in his campaign, arguing that the left-wing would support his stances on foreign policy and alternative energy, while conservatives would support his advocacy for civil defense. His campaign spent around $10,000. He was excluded from debates hosted by the Nevada County Board of Realtors. McClarin placed third in the general election, receiving 17,419 votes (6.5%).

After his election loss, McClarin remained active in local Libertarian politics. In 1981, he helped establish the Guardian Angels in Sacramento. By 1983, he had moved to Orangevale and worked to increase Libertarian Party registration in Sacramento County. The same year, McClarin became the executive director of the Placer County Libertarian Party. In this role, he oversaw the election of a Libertarian to the Placer County Board of Supervisors in 1984, and was awarded the California Libertarian Party's highest award for service. He was also the editor of the Capitol Libertarian newsletter.

=== New Hampshire ===
In March 1985, McClarin resigned from his positions in California and moved to New Hampshire to lead the party's efforts to gain seats in the New Hampshire House of Representatives. The previous summer, he was a salaried employee of the national Libertarian Party tasked with registering new members and recruiting party candidates in the state. McClarin's goal was to generate momentum leading to the 1988 presidential election, hoping to get the attention of the media and donors such as the Koch brothers.

By 1992, McClarin had become the chairman of Libertarian Party of New Hampshire's candidate development committee, tasked with leading the party's campaign for the state house in the 1992 elections. Considered to be an aggressive recruiter by the Honolulu Star-Bulletin, McClarin recruited over 70 Libertarian candidates, with four candidates being elected. An early supporter of releasing political press releases on online news outlets, he was also the editor of the Libertarian Lines newsletter during this period.

McClarin lived in Hillsborough County's 33rd state house district, a multi-member constituency which elected three representatives and consisted of Nashua ward 8. In the 1994 election, the Republican Party only ran two candidates in the three-member district. Seeing an opportunity, McClarin announced his candidacy for the district. He placed first in the Libertarian primary with 15 votes and third in the Republican primary with 21 votes, thus receiving nominations from both parties. McClarin was elected in the general election, placing second with 1,033 votes. (Note: The other two winning candidates were Republicans Joan C. Sullens (1,136 votes) and Elizabeth A. Cepaitis (1,016 votes)) McClarin and incumbent Don Gorman were the only two Libertarians elected to the state house in 1994.

McClarin's term began on December 7, 1994. He was a member of the Committee on Constitutional and Statutory Revision. During his brief tenure, McClarin co-sponsored three bills: one bill sought to "reaffirm state sovereignty under the Tenth Amendment to the United States Constitution", another proposed a revision to the state constitution which would add a procedure to repeal all state statutes, while the last would have established a tax credit for parents who homeschooled their children.

On February 3, 1995, McClarin resigned from the state house, citing conflict between the legislative schedule and his business obligations. He had also moved away from Nashua; state legislators in New Hampshire are required to live in the district they represent. McClarin missed all eight scheduled votes for which he was eligible. His resignation left Gorman as the only Libertarian in the state house. Following his resignation, McClarin remained active in party fundraising and organizing.

In the 2012 presidential election, McClarin supported Ron Paul in the Republican primary and Libertarian nominee Gary Johnson in the general election.
