= Hubert B. Scudder =

American politician (1888–1968)

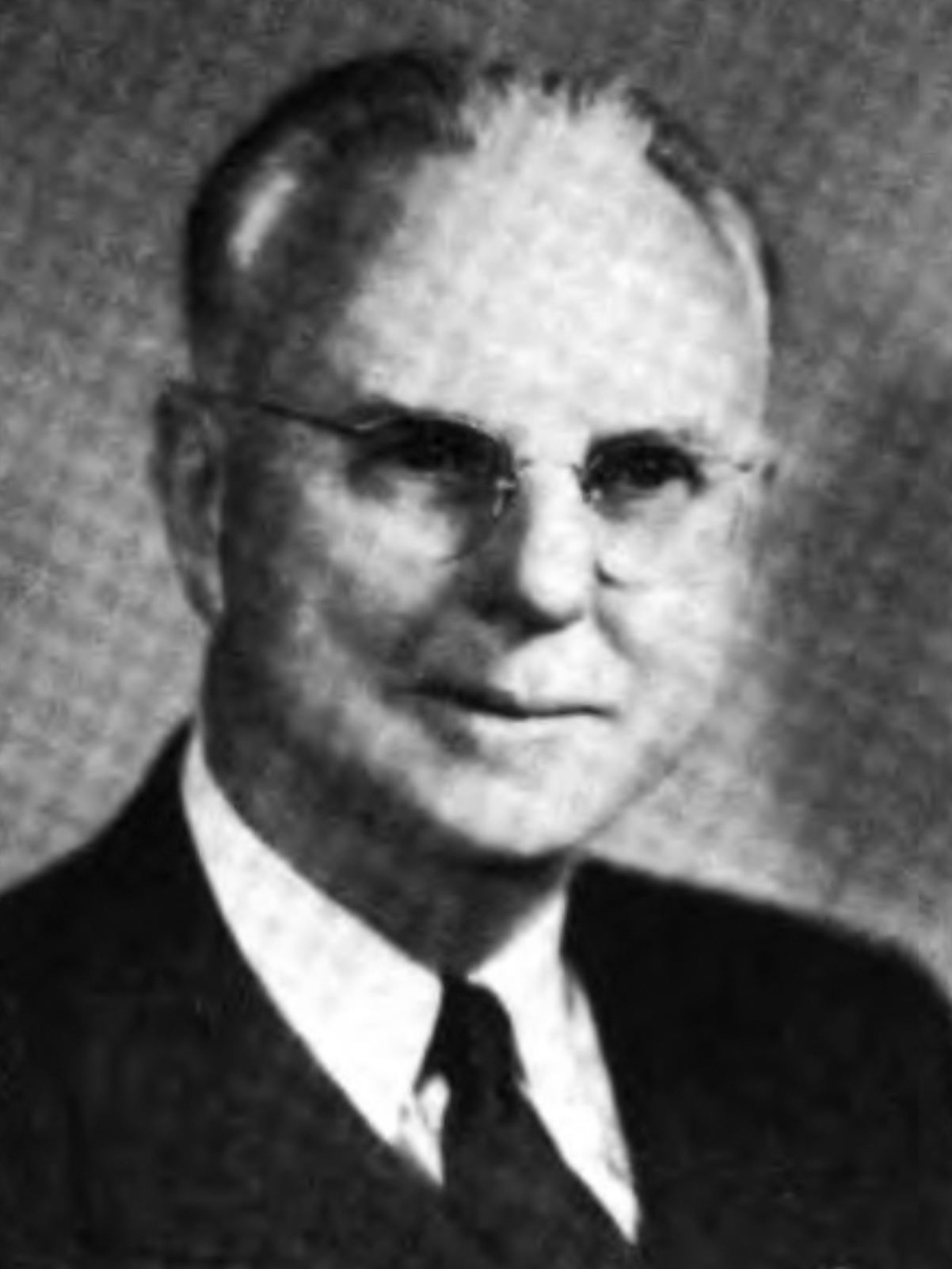

Member of the U.S. House of Representatives from California's 1st district
- In office January 3, 1949 – January 3, 1959
- Preceded by: Clarence F. Lea
- Succeeded by: Clement Woodnutt Miller

Member of the California State Assembly
- In office January 5, 1925 – January 6, 1941
- Preceded by: Emmett I. Donohue
- Succeeded by: Richard H. McCollister
- Constituency: 12th district (1925-1931); 7th district (1931-1941)

Personal details
- Born: Herbert Baxter Scudder; November 5, 1888 Sebastopol, California, U.S.
- Died: July 4, 1968 (aged 79) Sebastopol, California, U.S.
- Resting place: Sebastopol Cemetery
- Party: Republican
- Spouse: Helen B. Norton (after 1924)

Military service
- Allegiance: United States Army
- Branch/service: United States Army Coast Artillery Corps
- Years of service: 1918-1918

Hubert Baxter Scudder (November 5, 1888 – July 4, 1968) was an American lawyer and politician who served five terms as a U.S. representative from California from 1949 to 1959.

== Early life and education ==
Born in Sebastopol, California, Scudder graduated from the public schools, supplemented by correspondence courses, night schools, and the reading of law. He became superintendent of utilities for the city of Sebastopol from July 1, 1912 to November 4, 1920. He served in the United States Army Coast Artillery Corps from May to December 1918. He became involved in the insurance and real estate business in November 1920.

== Political career ==
Scudder was elected city councilman of Sebastopol in April 1924 and mayor in 1926. He was elected to and served as a member of the California State Assembly from January 1925 to January 1940. He was appointed real estate commissioner of the State of California in January 1943 and resigned March 1, 1948. He served as president of the National Association of License Law Officials from November 1947 to September 1948.

=== Congress ===
Scudder was elected as a Republican to the Eighty-first and to the four succeeding Congresses (January 3, 1949 – January 3, 1959). Scudder voted in favor of the Civil Rights Act of 1957. He did not run for re-election in 1958.

== Post-congressional career and death ==
After Congress, he returned to the real estate and insurance business. He died in Sebastopol, California, on July 4, 1968, and was interred in Sebastopol Cemetery.

== Electoral history ==
1948 United States House of Representatives elections
Party	Candidate	Votes	%
Republican	Hubert B. Scudder	82,947	54.5
Democratic	Sterling J. Norgard	68,951	45.3
Progressive	Roger Kent (write-in)	304	0.2
Total votes		152,302	100.0
Turnout			
Republican gain from Democratic			

1950 United States House of Representatives elections
Party	Candidate	Votes	%
Republican	Hubert B. Scudder (Incumbent)	85,122	54.0
Democratic	Roger Kent	72,584	46.0
Total votes		157,706	100.0
Turnout			
Republican hold			

1952 United States House of Representatives elections
Party	Candidate	Votes	%
Republican	Hubert B. Scudder (Incumbent)	137,801	86.4
Progressive	Carl Sullivan	21,734	13.6
Total votes		159,535	100.0
Turnout			
Republican hold			

1954 United States House of Representatives elections
Party	Candidate	Votes	%
Republican	Hubert B. Scudder (Incumbent)	83,762	59.1
Democratic	Max Kortum	58,004	40.9
Total votes		141,766	100.0
Turnout			
Republican hold			

1956 United States House of Representatives elections
Party	Candidate	Votes	%
Republican	Hubert B. Scudder (Incumbent)	102,604	53.6
Democratic	Clement Woodnutt Miller	88,962	46.4
Total votes		191,566	100.0
Turnout			
Republican hold			

U.S. House of Representatives
Preceded by Clarence F. Lea	Member of the U.S. House of Representatives from California's 1st congressional district 1949–1959	Succeeded by Clement Woodnutt Miller
