= California's 1st congressional district =

U.S. House district for California

Coordinates: 40.7°N 121.4°W

- Interactive map of district boundaries
- Representative: James Gallagher; R–East Nicolaus
- Population (2025): 761,978
- Median household income: $70,765
- Ethnicity: 61.5% White; 22.5% Hispanic; 6.1% Two or more races; 5.6% Asian; 1.8% Native American; 1.7% Black; 0.8% other
- Cook PVI: R+12

California's 1st congressional district is a U.S. congressional district in California. The district is currently represented by James Gallagher, who has represented the district following the June 2026 special election held to fill the vacancy created by the death of representative Doug LaMalfa. Currently, the district encompasses many northeastern parts of the state. Since the 2022 election, it includes the counties of Butte, Colusa, Glenn, Lassen, Modoc, Shasta, Siskiyou, Sutter, and Tehama, and most of Yuba County. The largest cities in the district are Chico, Redding, and Yuba City.

Prior to redistricting in 2021, it included the counties of Butte, Lassen, Modoc, Plumas, Shasta, Sierra, Siskiyou, and Tehama, most of Nevada County, part of Glenn County, and part of Placer County. In the 2021 redistricting, it added the Yuba–Sutter area and removed most of its share of the Sierra Nevada.

== Competitiveness ==
Prior to 2013, the GOP last held the seat in 1998 when U.S. Representative Frank Riggs decided to run for the U.S. Senate. Riggs was replaced by long-time Democratic Assemblyman and State Senator Mike Thompson. Redistricting in 2001 added Democratic-leaning areas of Yolo County.

John Kerry, a Democrat, won the district in 2004 presidential election with 59.7% of the vote. Barack Obama carried the district in 2008 presidential election with 65.60% of the vote. The redistricting after the 2010 census made the district much more Republican-leaning; Mitt Romney and Donald Trump won the district by double digits in 2012, 2016, 2020, and 2024 respectively.

== Recent election results from statewide races ==
Year	Office	Results
2008	President	McCain 57% – 43%
2010	Governor	Whitman 55% – 37%
2010	Lt. Governor	Maldonado 54% – 32%
2010	Secretary of State	Dunn 53% – 37%
2010	Attorney General	Cooley 58% – 30%
2010	Treasurer	Walters 51% – 40%
2010	Controller	Strickland 47% – 41%
2012	President	Romney 59% – 41%
2014	Governor	Kashkari 58% – 42%
2016	President	Trump 57% – 36%
2018	Governor	Cox 63% – 37%
2018	Attorney General	Bailey 61% – 39%
2020	President	Trump 58% – 39%
2022	Senate (Reg.)	Meuser 64% – 36%
2022	Governor	Dahle 67% – 33%
2022	Lt. Governor	Underwood Jacobs 65% – 35%
2022	Secretary of State	Bernosky 64% – 36%
2022	Attorney General	Hochman 65% – 35%
2022	Treasurer	Guerrero 65% – 35%
2022	Controller	Chen 66% – 34%
2024	President	Trump 61% – 36%
2024	Senate (Reg.)	Garvey 64% – 36%

== Composition ==
FIPS County Code	County	Seat	Population
007	Butte	Oroville	207,172
011	Colusa	Colusa	22,037
021	Glenn	Willows	28,129
035	Lassen	Susanville	28,861
049	Modoc	Alturas	8,500
089	Shasta	Redding	180,366
093	Siskiyou	Yreka	42,905
101	Sutter	Yuba City	97,948
103	Tehama	Red Bluff	64,896
115	Yuba	Marysville	85,722

Under the 2020 redistricting, California's 1st district is located in northeastern California, encompassing Butte, Colusa, Glenn, Lassen, Modoc, Shasta, Siskiyou, Sutter, and Tehama Counties, as well as part Yuba County. The area in Yuba County includes the cities of Marysville and Wheatland; and the census-designated places of Beale AFB, Linda, Olivehurst, and Plumas Lake.

Yuba County is split between this district and the 3rd district. They are partitioned by State Highway 70, Ellis Rd, and Union Pacific.

=== Cities and CDPs with 10,000 or more people ===
- Chico – 101,000
- Redding – 93,611
- Yuba City – 70,117
- Linda – 21,654
- Oroville – 20,042
- Susanville – 16,728
- Olivehurst – 16,595
- Red Bluff – 14,710
- Marysville – 12,844
- Anderson – 11,323
- Shasta Lake – 10,371

=== 2,500 – 10,000 people ===
- Live Oak – 9,106
- Corning – 8,244
- Plumas Lake – 8,126
- Oroville East – 8,038
- Magalia – 7,795
- Yreka – 7,807
- Orland – 7,622
- Gridley – 7,421
- Thermalito – 7,198
- Colusa – 6,411
- Willows – 6,072
- Durham – 5,834
- Palermo – 5,555
- Williams – 5,408
- Paradise – 4,764
- Wheatland – 3,873
- Wheatland – 3,712
- Arbuckle – 3,484
- South Oroville – 3,235
- Mount Shasta – 3,223
- Kelly Ridge – 3,006
- Sutter – 2,997
- Weed – 2,862
- Alturas – 2,715

== Future composition ==
Beginning with the 2026 election, the 1st district will consist of the following counties:

- Butte
- Glenn
- Lake
- Lassen
- Mendocino (part)
- Plumas
- Sierra
- Sonoma (part)
- Tehama

== List of members representing the district ==
Member	Party	Dates	Cong ress(es)	Electoral history	Counties
District created March 4, 1865
Donald C. McRuer (San Francisco)	Republican	March 4, 1865 – March 3, 1867	39th	Elected in 1864. Retired.	1865–1873; Fresno, Inyo, Kern, Los Angeles, Mariposa, Merced, Monterey, San Diego, San Francisco, San Luis Obispo, San Mateo, Santa Barbara, Santa Clara, Santa Cruz, Stanislaus, Tulare
Samuel Beach Axtell (San Francisco)	Democratic	March 4, 1867 – March 3, 1871	40th 41st	Elected in 1867. Re-elected in 1868. Retired.	1865–1873; Fresno, Inyo, Kern, Los Angeles, Mariposa, Merced, Monterey, San Diego, San Francisco, San Luis Obispo, San Mateo, Santa Barbara, Santa Clara, Santa Cruz, Stanislaus, Tulare
Sherman Otis Houghton (San Jose)	Republican	March 4, 1871 – March 3, 1873	42nd	Elected in 1871. Redistricted to the 4th district.	1865–1873; Fresno, Inyo, Kern, Los Angeles, Mariposa, Merced, Monterey, San Diego, San Francisco, San Luis Obispo, San Mateo, Santa Barbara, Santa Clara, Santa Cruz, Stanislaus, Tulare
Charles Clayton (San Francisco)	Republican	March 4, 1873 – March 3, 1875	43rd	Elected in 1872. Retired.	1873–1885; San Francisco
William Adam Piper (San Francisco)	Democratic	March 4, 1875 – March 3, 1877	44th	Elected in 1875. Lost re-election.	1873–1885; San Francisco
Horace Davis (San Francisco)	Republican	March 4, 1877 – March 3, 1881	45th 46th	Elected in 1876. Re-elected in 1879. Lost re-election.	1873–1885; San Francisco
William Rosecrans (San Francisco)	Democratic	March 4, 1881 – March 3, 1885	47th 48th	Elected in 1880. Re-elected in 1882. Retired.	1873–1885; San Francisco
Barclay Henley (Santa Rosa)	Democratic	March 4, 1885 – March 3, 1887	49th	Redistricted from the 3rd district and re-elected in 1884. Retired.	1885–1895; Colusa, Del Norte, Humboldt, Lake, Lassen, Mendocino, Modoc, Napa, Plumas, Shasta, Sierra, Siskiyou, Sonoma, Tehama, Trinity
Thomas L. Thompson (Santa Rosa)	Democratic	March 4, 1887 – March 3, 1889	50th	Elected in 1886. Lost re-election.	1885–1895; Colusa, Del Norte, Humboldt, Lake, Lassen, Mendocino, Modoc, Napa, Plumas, Shasta, Sierra, Siskiyou, Sonoma, Tehama, Trinity
John J. De Haven (Eureka)	Republican	March 4, 1889 – October 1, 1890	51st	Elected in 1888. Resigned to become associate justice of the California Supreme Court.	1885–1895; Colusa, Del Norte, Humboldt, Lake, Lassen, Mendocino, Modoc, Napa, Plumas, Shasta, Sierra, Siskiyou, Sonoma, Tehama, Trinity
Vacant		October 1, 1890 – December 9, 1890	51st		1885–1895; Colusa, Del Norte, Humboldt, Lake, Lassen, Mendocino, Modoc, Napa, Plumas, Shasta, Sierra, Siskiyou, Sonoma, Tehama, Trinity
Thomas J. Geary (Santa Rosa)	Democratic	December 9, 1890 – March 3, 1895	51st 52nd 53rd	Elected to finish De Haven's term. Also elected the same day in 1890 to the next term. Re-elected in 1892. Lost re-election.	1885–1895; Colusa, Del Norte, Humboldt, Lake, Lassen, Mendocino, Modoc, Napa, Plumas, Shasta, Sierra, Siskiyou, Sonoma, Tehama, Trinity
John All Barham (Santa Rosa)	Republican	March 4, 1895 – March 3, 1901	54th 55th 56th	Elected in 1894. Re-elected in 1896. Re-elected in 1898. Retired.	1895–1903; Del Norte, Humboldt, Lassen, Marin, Mendocino, Modoc, Napa, Plumas, Shasta, Sierra, Siskiyou, Sonoma, Tehama, Trinity
Frank Coombs (Napa)	Republican	March 4, 1901 – March 3, 1903	57th	Elected in 1900. Lost re-election.	1895–1903; Del Norte, Humboldt, Lassen, Marin, Mendocino, Modoc, Napa, Plumas, Shasta, Sierra, Siskiyou, Sonoma, Tehama, Trinity
James Gillett (Eureka)	Republican	March 4, 1903 – November 4, 1906	58th 59th	Elected in 1902. Re-elected in 1904. Resigned when elected Governor.	1903–1913; Alpine, Amador, Calaveras, Del Norte, El Dorado, Humboldt, Lassen, Mariposa, Modoc, Mono, Nevada, Placer, Plumas, Shasta, Sierra, Siskiyou, Tehama, Trinity, Tuolumne
Vacant		November 4, 1906 – November 6, 1906	59th		1903–1913; Alpine, Amador, Calaveras, Del Norte, El Dorado, Humboldt, Lassen, Mariposa, Modoc, Mono, Nevada, Placer, Plumas, Shasta, Sierra, Siskiyou, Tehama, Trinity, Tuolumne
William F. Englebright (Nevada City)	Republican	November 6, 1906 – March 3, 1911	59th 60th 61st	Elected to finish Gillett's term. Also elected the same day in 1906 to the next term. Re-elected in 1908. Lost re-election.	1903–1913; Alpine, Amador, Calaveras, Del Norte, El Dorado, Humboldt, Lassen, Mariposa, Modoc, Mono, Nevada, Placer, Plumas, Shasta, Sierra, Siskiyou, Tehama, Trinity, Tuolumne
John E. Raker (Alturas)	Democratic	March 4, 1911 – March 3, 1913	62nd	Elected in 1910. Redistricted to the 2nd district.	1903–1913; Alpine, Amador, Calaveras, Del Norte, El Dorado, Humboldt, Lassen, Mariposa, Modoc, Mono, Nevada, Placer, Plumas, Shasta, Sierra, Siskiyou, Tehama, Trinity, Tuolumne
William Kent (Kentfield)	Independent	March 4, 1913 – March 3, 1917	63rd 64th	Redistricted from the 2nd district and re-elected in 1912. Re-elected in 1914. Retired.	1913–1953; Butte, Colusa, Del Norte, Glenn, Humboldt, Lake, Marin, Mendocino, Sonoma, Sutter, Yuba
Clarence F. Lea (Santa Rosa)	Democratic	March 4, 1917 – January 3, 1949	65th 66th 67th 68th 69th 70th 71st 72nd 73rd 74th 75th 76th 77th 78th 79th 80th	Elected in 1916. Re-elected in 1918. Re-elected in 1920. Re-elected in 1922. Re-elected in 1924. Re-elected in 1926. Re-elected in 1928. Re-elected in 1930. Re-elected in 1932. Re-elected in 1934. Re-elected in 1936. Re-elected in 1938. Re-elected in 1940. Re-elected in 1942. Re-elected in 1944. Re-elected in 1946. Retired.	1913–1953; Butte, Colusa, Del Norte, Glenn, Humboldt, Lake, Marin, Mendocino, Sonoma, Sutter, Yuba
Hubert B. Scudder (Sebastopol)	Republican	January 3, 1949 – January 3, 1959	81st 82nd 83rd 84th 85th	Elected in 1948. Re-elected in 1950. Re-elected in 1952. Re-elected in 1954. Re-elected in 1956. Retired.	1913–1953; Butte, Colusa, Del Norte, Glenn, Humboldt, Lake, Marin, Mendocino, Sonoma, Sutter, Yuba
Hubert B. Scudder (Sebastopol)	Republican	January 3, 1949 – January 3, 1959	81st 82nd 83rd 84th 85th	Elected in 1948. Re-elected in 1950. Re-elected in 1952. Re-elected in 1954. Re-elected in 1956. Retired.	1953–1963; Del Norte, Humboldt, Lake, Marin, Mendocino, Napa, Sonoma
Clement Woodnutt Miller (Corte Madera)	Democratic	January 3, 1959 – October 7, 1962	86th 87th	Elected in 1958. Re-elected in 1960. Died. Re-elected posthumously in 1962.	1953–1963; Del Norte, Humboldt, Lake, Marin, Mendocino, Napa, Sonoma
Vacant		October 7, 1962 – January 22, 1963	87th 88th		1953–1963; Del Norte, Humboldt, Lake, Marin, Mendocino, Napa, Sonoma
Vacant		October 7, 1962 – January 22, 1963	87th 88th		1963–1967; Del Norte, Humboldt, Marin, Mendocino, Napa, Sonoma
Donald H. Clausen (Crescent City)	Republican	January 22, 1963 – January 3, 1975	88th 89th 90th 91st 92nd 93rd	Elected to finish Miller's term. Re-elected in 1964. Re-elected in 1966. Re-elected in 1968. Re-elected in 1970. Re-elected in 1972. Redistricted to the 2nd district.	1963–1967; Del Norte, Humboldt, Marin, Mendocino, Napa, Sonoma
Donald H. Clausen (Crescent City)	Republican	January 22, 1963 – January 3, 1975	88th 89th 90th 91st 92nd 93rd	Elected to finish Miller's term. Re-elected in 1964. Re-elected in 1966. Re-elected in 1968. Re-elected in 1970. Re-elected in 1972. Redistricted to the 2nd district.	1967–1973; Del Norte, Humboldt, most of Marin, Mendocino, Napa, Sonoma
Donald H. Clausen (Crescent City)	Republican	January 22, 1963 – January 3, 1975	88th 89th 90th 91st 92nd 93rd	Elected to finish Miller's term. Re-elected in 1964. Re-elected in 1966. Re-elected in 1968. Re-elected in 1970. Re-elected in 1972. Redistricted to the 2nd district.	1973–1983; Butte, Glenn, Lassen, Modoc, Nevada, Placer, Plumas, Shasta, Sierra, Siskiyou, Tehama, Trinity, Yuba
Harold T. Johnson (Roseville)	Democratic	January 3, 1975 – January 3, 1981	94th 95th 96th	Redistricted from the 2nd district and re-elected in 1974. Re-elected in 1976. Re-elected in 1978. Lost re-election.	1973–1983; Butte, Glenn, Lassen, Modoc, Nevada, Placer, Plumas, Shasta, Sierra, Siskiyou, Tehama, Trinity, Yuba
Eugene A. Chappie (Roseville)	Republican	January 3, 1981 – January 3, 1983	97th	Elected in 1980. Redistricted to the 2nd district.	1973–1983; Butte, Glenn, Lassen, Modoc, Nevada, Placer, Plumas, Shasta, Sierra, Siskiyou, Tehama, Trinity, Yuba
Douglas Bosco (Occidental)	Democratic	January 3, 1983 – January 3, 1991	98th 99th 100th 101st	Elected in 1982. Re-elected in 1984. Re-elected in 1986. Re-elected in 1988. Lost re-election.	1983–1993; Del Norte, Humboldt, western Lake, Mendocino, southern Napa, northern Sonoma
Frank Riggs (Santa Rosa)	Republican	January 3, 1991 – January 3, 1993	102nd	Elected in 1990. Lost re-election.	1983–1993; Del Norte, Humboldt, western Lake, Mendocino, southern Napa, northern Sonoma
Daniel Hamburg (Ukiah)	Democratic	January 3, 1993 – January 3, 1995	103rd	Elected in 1992. Lost re-election.	1993–2003; Del Norte, Humboldt, western Lake, Mendocino, Napa, northwestern Solano, northeastern Sonoma
Frank Riggs (Windsor)	Republican	January 3, 1995 – January 3, 1999	104th 105th	Elected in 1994. Re-elected in 1996. Retired to run for U.S. Senator.	1993–2003; Del Norte, Humboldt, western Lake, Mendocino, Napa, northwestern Solano, northeastern Sonoma
Mike Thompson (St. Helena)	Democratic	January 3, 1999 – January 3, 2013	106th 107th 108th 109th 110th 111th 112th	Elected in 1998. Re-elected in 2000. Re-elected in 2002. Re-elected in 2004. Re-elected in 2006. Re-elected in 2008. Re-elected in 2010. Redistricted to the 5th district.	1993–2003; Del Norte, Humboldt, western Lake, Mendocino, Napa, northwestern Solano, northeastern Sonoma
Mike Thompson (St. Helena)	Democratic	January 3, 1999 – January 3, 2013	106th 107th 108th 109th 110th 111th 112th	Elected in 1998. Re-elected in 2000. Re-elected in 2002. Re-elected in 2004. Re-elected in 2006. Re-elected in 2008. Re-elected in 2010. Redistricted to the 5th district.	2003–2013 Del Norte, Humboldt, Lake, Mendocino, Napa, eastern Sonoma, southern Yolo
Doug LaMalfa (Oroville)	Republican	January 3, 2013 – January 6, 2026	113th 114th 115th 116th 117th 118th 119th	Elected in 2012. Re-elected in 2014. Re-elected in 2016. Re-elected in 2018. Re-elected in 2020. Re-elected in 2022. Re-elected in 2024. Died.	2013–2023 Inland Northern California including Butte, Lassen, Modoc, Plumas, Shasta, Sierra, Siskiyou, and Tehama counties, plus portions of Glenn, Nevada, and Placer counties. Including the main hubs of Chico and Redding, in Butte and Shasta counties respectively.
Doug LaMalfa (Oroville)	Republican	January 3, 2013 – January 6, 2026	113th 114th 115th 116th 117th 118th 119th	Elected in 2012. Re-elected in 2014. Re-elected in 2016. Re-elected in 2018. Re-elected in 2020. Re-elected in 2022. Re-elected in 2024. Died.	2023–2027
Vacant		January 6, 2026 – June 10, 2026	119th		2023–2027
James Gallagher (East Nicolaus)	Republican	June 10, 2026 – present	119th	Elected to finish LaMalfa’s term. Lost re-election.	2023–2027
Mike McGuire (Healdsburg)	Democratic	Assuming office on January 3, 2027		Elected in 2026.	

== Election results ==
=== 1864 ===
1864 United States House of Representatives elections
Party	Candidate	Votes	%
Republican	Donald C. McRuer	20,370	58.9
Democratic	Joseph B. Crocker	14,191	41.1
Total votes		34,561	100.0
Republican hold			

=== 1866 ===
1866 United States House of Representatives elections
Party	Candidate	Votes	%
Democratic	Samuel Beach Axtell	18,793	57.3
Republican	Timothy Guy Phelps	13,989	42.7
Total votes		32,782	100.0
Democratic gain from Republican			

=== 1868 ===
1868 United States House of Representatives elections
Party	Candidate	Votes	%
Democratic	Samuel Beach Axtell (Incumbent)	23,632	54.1
Republican	Frank M. Pixley	20,081	45.9
Total votes		43,713	100.0
Democratic hold			

=== 1870 ===
1870 United States House of Representatives elections
Party	Candidate	Votes	%
Republican	Sherman Otis Houghton	25,971	51.6
Democratic	Lawrence Archer	24,374	48.4
Total votes		50,345	100.0
Republican gain from Democratic			

=== 1872 ===
1872 United States House of Representatives elections
Party	Candidate	Votes	%
Republican	Charles Clayton	11,938	52.3
Democratic	William Adam Piper	10,883	47.7
Total votes		22,821	100.0
Republican win (new seat)			

=== 1874 ===
1874 United States House of Representatives elections
Party	Candidate	Votes	%
Democratic	William Adam Piper	12,417	49.1
Republican	Ira P. Rankin	6,791	26.8
Independent	John F. Swift	6,103	24.1
Total votes		25,311	100.0
Democratic gain from Republican			

=== 1876 ===
1876 United States House of Representatives elections
Party	Candidate	Votes	%
Republican	Horace Davis	22,134	53.3
Democratic	William Adam Piper (Incumbent)	19,363	46.7
Total votes		41,497	100.0
Republican gain from Democratic			

=== 1879 ===
1879 United States House of Representatives elections
Party	Candidate	Votes	%
Republican	Horace Davis (Incumbent)	20,074	48.4
Workingmen's Party of California	Clitus Barbour	18,449	44.5
Democratic	Charles R. Summer	2,940	7.1
Total votes		41,463	100.0
Republican hold			

=== 1880 ===
1880 United States House of Representatives elections
Party	Candidate	Votes	%
Democratic	William Rosecrans	21,005	51.0
Republican	Horace Davis (Incumbent)	19,496	47.3
Greenback	Stephen Maybell	683	1.7
Total votes		41,184	100.0
Democratic gain from Republican			

=== 1882 ===
1882 United States House of Representatives elections
Party	Candidate	Votes	%
Democratic	William Rosecrans (Incumbent)	22,733	59.5
Republican	Paul Neumann	14,847	38.8
Prohibition	James M. Shafter	580	1.5
Greenback	H. S. Fitch	67	0.2
Total votes		38,227	100.0
Democratic hold			

=== 1884 ===
1884 United States House of Representatives elections
Party	Candidate	Votes	%
Democratic	Barclay Henley	16,461	49.7
Republican	Thomas L. Carothers	16,316	49.3
Independent	C. C. Bateman	321	1.0
Total votes		33,098	100.0
Democratic hold			

=== 1886 ===
1886 United States House of Representatives elections
Party	Candidate	Votes	%
Democratic	Thomas Larkin Thompson	16,499	50.1
Republican	Charles A. Garter	15,526	47.1
Prohibition	L. W. Simmons	849	2.6
Independent	Philip Cowen	80	0.2
Total votes		32,954	100.0
Democratic hold			

=== 1888 ===
1888 United States House of Representatives elections
Party	Candidate	Votes	%
Republican	John J. De Haven	19,345	49.9
Democratic	Thomas Larkin Thompson (Incumbent)	19,019	49.0
Know Nothing	W. D. Reynolds	428	1.1
Total votes		38,792	100.0
Republican gain from Democratic			

=== 1890 Special & General ===
1890 United States House of Representatives elections
Party	Candidate	Votes	%
Democratic	Thomas J. Geary	19,334	49.3
Republican	John All Barham	19,153	48.8
Prohibition	L. B. Scranton	759	1.9
Total votes		39,246	100.0
Democratic gain from Republican			

=== 1892 ===
1892 United States House of Representatives elections
Party	Candidate	Votes	%
Democratic	Thomas J. Geary (Incumbent)	19,308	56.8
Republican	Edward W. Davis	13,123	38.6
Populist	C. C. Swafford	1,546	4.6
Total votes		33,977	100.0
Democratic hold			

=== 1894 ===
1894 United States House of Representatives elections
Party	Candidate	Votes	%
Republican	John All Barham	15,101	41.1
Democratic	Thomas J. Geary (Incumbent)	13,570	37.0
Populist	Roger F. Grigsby	7,246	19.7
Prohibition	J. R. Gregory	790	2.2
Total votes		36,707	100.0
Republican gain from Democratic			

=== 1896 ===
1896 United States House of Representatives elections
Party	Candidate	Votes	%
Republican	John All Barham (Incumbent)	17,826	49.7
Democratic	Fletcher A. Cutler	16,328	45.5
Populist	George W. Montieth	1,497	4.2
Prohibition	B. F. Taylor	249	0.7
Total votes		35,900	100.0
Republican hold			

=== 1898 ===
1898 United States House of Representatives elections
Party	Candidate	Votes	%
Republican	John All Barham (Incumbent)	19,598	51.8
Democratic	Emmett Seawell	18,244	48.2
Total votes		37,842	100.0
Turnout			
Republican hold			

=== 1900 ===
1900 United States House of Representatives elections
Party	Candidate	Votes	%
Republican	Frank Coombs	21,227	55.3
Democratic	James F. Farraher	16,270	42.4
Social Democratic	William Morgan	599	1.6
Prohibition	Charles T. Clark	310	0.8
Total votes		38,406	100.0
Republican hold			

=== 1902 ===
1902 United States House of Representatives elections
Party	Candidate	Votes	%
Republican	James Gillett	21,268	50.5
Democratic	Anthony Caminetti	19,696	46.7
Socialist	M. F. Shore	810	1.9
Prohibition	W. O. Clark	362	0.9
Total votes		42,136	100.0
Republican hold			

=== 1904 ===
1904 United States House of Representatives elections
Party	Candidate	Votes	%
Republican	James Gillett (Incumbent)	21,602	54.1
Democratic	Anthony Caminetti	15,706	39.3
Socialist	A. J. Gaylord	2,197	5.5
Prohibition	Jarrot L. Rollins	421	1.1
Total votes		39,926	100.0
Republican hold			

=== 1906 (Special) ===
1906 United States House of Representatives elections
Party	Candidate	Votes	%
Republican	William F. Englebright	18,125	95.2
Democratic	F. W. Taft	539	2.8
Socialist	J. C. Weybright	325	1.7
Prohibition	R. L. Webb	51	0.3
Total votes		19,040	100.0
Republican hold			

=== 1906 (General) ===
1906 United States House of Representatives elections
Party	Candidate	Votes	%
Republican	William F. Englebright	18,954	54.0
Democratic	F. W. Taft	13,984	39.9
Socialist	J. C. Weybright	1,736	5.0
Prohibition	R. L. Webb	392	1.1
Total votes		35,066	100.0
Republican hold			

=== 1908 ===
1908 United States House of Representatives elections
Party	Candidate	Votes	%
Republican	William F. Englebright (Incumbent)	20,624	54.1
Democratic	E. W. Holland	14,031	36.8
Socialist	D. N. Cunningham	2,898	7.6
Prohibition	W. P. Fassett	546	1.4
Total votes		38,099	100.0
Republican hold			

=== 1910 ===
1910 United States House of Representatives elections
Party	Candidate	Votes	%
Democratic	John E. Raker	16,704	45.4
Republican	William F. Englebright (Incumbent)	16,570	45.1
Socialist	William Morgan	3,231	8.8
Prohibition	C. H. Essex	259	0.7
Total votes		37,064	100.0
Democratic gain from Republican			

=== 1912 ===
1912 United States House of Representatives elections
Party	Candidate	Votes	%
Independent	William Kent	20,341	37.3
Democratic	I. G. Zumwalt	18,756	34.4
Republican	Edward H. Hart	10,585	19.4
Socialist	Joseph Bredsteen	4,892	9.0
Total votes		54,574	100.0
Independent gain from Democratic			

=== 1914 ===
1914 United States House of Representatives elections
Party	Candidate	Votes	%
Independent	William Kent (Incumbent)	35,403	48.1
Republican	Edward H. Hart	28,166	38.3
Democratic	O. F. Meldon	7,987	10.8
Prohibition	Henry P. Stipp	2,068	2.8
Total votes		73,624	100.0
Independent hold			

=== 1916 ===
1916 United States House of Representatives elections
Party	Candidate	Votes	%
Democratic	Clarence F. Lea	32,797	48.8
Republican	Edward H. Hart	28,769	42.8
Socialist	Mary M. Morgan	3,730	5.5
Prohibition	Jay Scott Ryder	1,935	2.9
Total votes		67,231	100.0
Democratic gain from Independent			

=== 1918 ===
1918 United States House of Representatives elections
Party	Candidate	Votes	%
Democratic	Clarence F. Lea (Incumbent)	42,063	100.0
Democratic hold			

=== 1920 ===
1920 United States House of Representatives elections
Party	Candidate	Votes	%
Democratic	Clarence F. Lea (Incumbent)	34,427	61.7
Republican	C. A. Bodwell Jr.	18,569	33.3
Socialist	A. K. Gifford	2,773	5.0
Total votes		55,769	100.0
Democratic hold			

=== 1922 ===
1922 United States House of Representatives elections
Party	Candidate	Votes	%
Democratic	Clarence F. Lea (Incumbent)	53,129	100.0
Democratic hold			

=== 1924 ===
1924 United States House of Representatives elections
Party	Candidate	Votes	%
Democratic	Clarence F. Lea (Incumbent)	47,250	100.0
Democratic hold			

=== 1926 ===
1926 United States House of Representatives elections
Party	Candidate	Votes	%
Democratic	Clarence F. Lea (Incumbent)	60,207	100.0
Democratic hold			

=== 1928 ===
1928 United States House of Representatives elections
Party	Candidate	Votes	%
Democratic	Clarence F. Lea (Incumbent)	56,381	100.0
Democratic hold			

=== 1930 ===
1930 United States House of Representatives elections
Party	Candidate	Votes	%
Democratic	Clarence F. Lea (Incumbent)	66,703	100.0
Democratic hold			

=== 1932 ===
1932 United States House of Representatives elections
Party	Candidate	Votes	%
Democratic	Clarence F. Lea (Incumbent)	73,400	100.0
Democratic hold			

=== 1934 ===
1934 United States House of Representatives elections
Party	Candidate	Votes	%
Democratic	Clarence F. Lea (Incumbent)	98,661	93.6
Socialist	Allen K. Gifford	6,698	6.4
Total votes		105,359	100.0
Democratic hold			

=== 1936 ===
1936 United States House of Representatives elections
Party	Candidate	Votes	%
Democratic	Clarence F. Lea (Incumbent)	58,073	53.8
Republican	Nelson B. Van Matre	48,647	45.1
Communist	Vernon Dennis Healy	1,218	1.1
Total votes		107,938	100.0
Democratic hold			

=== 1938 ===
1938 United States House of Representatives elections
Party	Candidate	Votes	%
Democratic	Clarence F. Lea (Incumbent)	73,636	63
Townsend	Ernest S. Mitchell	43,320	37
Total votes		116,956	100
Democratic hold			

=== 1940 ===
1940 United States House of Representatives elections
Party	Candidate	Votes	%
Democratic	Clarence F. Lea (Incumbent)	103,547	93.3
Communist	Albert J. Lima	5,647	5.1
Independent	Ernest S. Mitchell (write-in)	1,828	1.6
Total votes		111,022	100.0
Democratic hold			

=== 1942 ===
1942 United States House of Representatives elections
Party	Candidate	Votes	%
Democratic	Clarence F. Lea (Incumbent)	78,281	93.2
Communist	Albert J. Lima	5,703	6.8
Total votes		83,984	100.0
Democratic hold			

=== 1944 ===
1944 United States House of Representatives elections
Party	Candidate	Votes	%
Democratic	Clarence F. Lea (Incumbent)	92,706	100.0
Democratic hold			

=== 1946 ===
1946 United States House of Representatives elections
Party	Candidate	Votes	%
Democratic	Clarence F. Lea (Incumbent)	77,653	100.0
Democratic hold			

=== 1948 ===
1948 United States House of Representatives elections
Party	Candidate	Votes	%
Republican	Hubert B. Scudder	82,947	54.5
Democratic	Sterling J. Norgard	68,951	45.3
Progressive	Roger Kent (write-in)	304	0.2
Total votes		152,302	100.0
Republican gain from Democratic			

=== 1950 ===
1950 United States House of Representatives elections
Party	Candidate	Votes	%
Republican	Hubert B. Scudder (Incumbent)	85,122	54.0
Democratic	Roger Kent	72,584	46.0
Total votes		157,706	100.0
Republican hold			

=== 1952 ===
1952 United States House of Representatives elections
Party	Candidate	Votes	%
Republican	Hubert B. Scudder (Incumbent)	137,801	86.4
Progressive	Carl Sullivan	21,734	13.6
Total votes		159,535	100.0
Republican hold			

=== 1954 ===
1954 United States House of Representatives elections
Party	Candidate	Votes	%
Republican	Hubert B. Scudder (Incumbent)	83,762	59.1
Democratic	Max Kortum	58,004	40.9
Total votes		141,766	100.0
Republican hold			

=== 1956 ===
1956 United States House of Representatives elections
Party	Candidate	Votes	%
Republican	Hubert B. Scudder (Incumbent)	102,604	53.6
Democratic	Clement Woodnutt Miller	88,962	46.4
Total votes		191,566	100.0
Republican hold			

=== 1958 ===
1958 United States House of Representatives elections
Party	Candidate	Votes	%
Democratic	Clement Woodnutt Miller	102,096	54.9
Republican	Frederick G. Dupuis	84,807	45.1
Total votes		185,903	100.0
Democratic gain from Republican			

=== 1960 ===
1960 United States House of Representatives elections
Party	Candidate	Votes	%
Democratic	Clement Woodnutt Miller (Incumbent)	115,829	51.6
Republican	Frederick G. Dupuis	108,505	48.4
Total votes		224,334	100.0
Democratic hold			

=== 1962 ===
1962 United States House of Representatives elections
Party	Candidate	Votes	%
Democratic	Clement Woodnutt Miller (Incumbent)	100,962	50.8
Republican	Donald H. Clausen	97,949	49.2
Total votes		198,911	100.0
Democratic hold			

=== 1963 (Special) ===
1963 Special election
Party	Candidate	Votes	%
Republican	Don H. Clausen		54.2
Democratic	William F. Grader		44.7
Democratic	John C. Stuart (write-in)		1.1
Total votes			100.0
Republican gain from Democratic			

=== 1964 ===
1964 United States House of Representatives elections
Party	Candidate	Votes	%
Republican	Donald H. Clausen (Incumbent)	141,048	59.1
Democratic	George McCabe	97,651	40.9
Total votes		238,699	100.0
Republican hold			

=== 1966 ===
1966 United States House of Representatives elections
Party	Candidate	Votes	%
Republican	Donald H. Clausen (Incumbent)	143,755	65.1
Democratic	Thomas T. Storer	77,000	34.9
Total votes		220,755	100.0
Republican hold			

=== 1968 ===
1968 United States House of Representatives elections
Party	Candidate	Votes	%
Republican	Donald H. Clausen (Incumbent)	132,433	75.1
Democratic	Donald W. Graham	37,650	21.4
Peace and Freedom	Adolph N. Hofmann	3,372	1.9
American Independent	Gladys O'Neil	2,882	1.6
Total votes		176,337	100.0
Republican hold			

=== 1970 ===
1970 United States House of Representatives elections
Party	Candidate	Votes	%
Republican	Donald H. Clausen (Incumbent)	108,358	63.5
Democratic	William Kortum	62,688	36.5
Total votes		171,046	100.0
Republican hold			

=== 1972 ===
1972 United States House of Representatives elections
Party	Candidate	Votes	%
Republican	Donald H. Clausen (Incumbent)	140,807	62.2
Democratic	William A. Nighswonger	77,138	34.1
Peace and Freedom	Jonathan T. Ames	8,470	3.7
Total votes		226,145	100.0
Republican hold			

=== 1974 ===
1974 United States House of Representatives elections
Party	Candidate	Votes	%
Democratic	Harold T. Johnson (Incumbent)	137,849	85.8
American Independent	Dorothy D. Paradis	22,628	14.2
Total votes		160,477	100.0
Democratic hold			

=== 1976 ===
1976 United States House of Representatives elections
Party	Candidate	Votes	%
Democratic	Harold T. Johnson (Incumbent)	160,477	73.9
Republican	James E. Taylor	56,539	26.1
Total votes		217,016	100.0
Democratic hold			

=== 1978 ===
1978 United States House of Representatives elections
Party	Candidate	Votes	%
Democratic	Harold T. Johnson (Incumbent)	125,122	59.4
Republican	James E. Taylor	85,690	40.6
Total votes		210,812	100.0
Democratic hold			

=== 1980 ===
1980 United States House of Representatives elections
Party	Candidate	Votes	%
Republican	Eugene A. Chappie	145,098	53.7
Democratic	Harold T. Johnson (Incumbent)	107,682	39.8
Libertarian	Jim McClarin	17,419	6.5
Total votes		270,199	100.0
Republican gain from Democratic			

=== 1982 ===
1982 United States House of Representatives elections
Party	Candidate	Votes	%
Democratic	Douglas Bosco	107,749	49.8
Republican	Donald H. Clausen (Incumbent)	102,043	47.2
Libertarian	David Redick	6,374	2.9
Total votes		216,166	100.0
Democratic gain from Republican			

=== 1984 ===
1984 United States House of Representatives elections
Party	Candidate	Votes	%
Democratic	Douglas Bosco (Incumbent)	157,037	62.3
Republican	Floyd G. Sampson	95,186	37.7
Total votes		252,223	100.0
Democratic hold			

=== 1986 ===
1986 United States House of Representatives elections
Party	Candidate	Votes	%
Democratic	Douglas Bosco (Incumbent)	138,174	67.5
Republican	Floyd G. Sampson	54,436	26.6
Peace and Freedom	Elden McFarland	12,149	5.9
Total votes		204,759	100.0
Democratic hold			

=== 1988 ===
1988 United States House of Representatives elections
Party	Candidate	Votes	%
Democratic	Douglas Bosco (Incumbent)	159,815	62.9
Republican	Samuel "Mark" Vanderbilt	72,189	28.4
Peace and Freedom	Eric Fried	22,150	8.7
Total votes		254,154	100.0
Democratic hold			

=== 1990 ===
1990 United States House of Representatives elections
Party	Candidate	Votes	%
Republican	Frank Riggs	99,782	43.3
Democratic	Douglas Bosco (Incumbent)	96,468	41.9
Peace and Freedom	Darlene G. Comingore	34,011	14.8
Total votes		230,261	100.0
Republican gain from Democratic			

=== 1992 ===
1992 United States House of Representatives elections
Party	Candidate	Votes	%
Democratic	Dan Hamburg	119,676	47.6
Republican	Frank Riggs (Incumbent)	113,266	45.1
Peace and Freedom	Phil Baldwin	10,764	4.3
Libertarian	Matthew L. Howard	7,500	3.0
Total votes		251,206	100.0
Democratic gain from Republican			

=== 1994 ===
1994 United States House of Representatives elections
Party	Candidate	Votes	%
Republican	Frank Riggs	106,870	53.3
Democratic	Dan Hamburg (Incumbent)	93,717	46.7
No party	Chase (write-in)	86	0.0
Total votes		200,673	100.0
Republican gain from Democratic			

=== 1996 ===
1996 United States House of Representatives elections
Party	Candidate	Votes	%
Republican	Frank Riggs (Incumbent)	110,242	49.7
Democratic	Michela Alioto	96,522	43.4
Libertarian	Emil Rossi	15,354	6.9
Total votes		222,118	100.0
Republican hold			

=== 1998 ===
1998 United States House of Representatives elections
Party	Candidate	Votes	%
Democratic	Mike Thompson	121,713	61.9
Republican	Mark Luce	64,622	32.8
Libertarian	Emil Rossi	5,404	2.8
Peace and Freedom	Ernest K. Jones Jr.	4,996	2.5
Republican	Lawrence R. Weisner (write-in)	37	0.0
Total votes		196,772	100.0
Democratic gain from Republican			

=== 2000 ===
2000 United States House of Representatives elections in California
Party	Candidate	Votes	%
Democratic	Mike Thompson (Incumbent)	155,638	65.1
Republican	Russel J. "Jim" Chase	66,987	28.0
Natural Law	Cheryl Kreier	7,173	3.0
Libertarian	Emil P. Rossi	6,376	2.6
Reform	Pamela Elizondo	3,161	1.3
Total votes		239,335	100.0
Democratic hold			

=== 2002 ===
2002 United States House of Representatives elections in California
Party	Candidate	Votes	%
Democratic	Mike Thompson (Incumbent)	118,669	64.1
Republican	Lawrence R. Wiesner	60,013	32.4
Libertarian	Kevin Bastian	6,534	3.5
Total votes		185,216	100.0
Turnout			
Democratic hold			

=== 2004 ===
2004 United States House of Representatives elections in California
Party	Candidate	Votes	%
Democratic	Mike Thompson (Incumbent)	189,336	67.0
Republican	Lawrence R. Wiesner	79,970	28.2
Green	Pamela Elizondo	13,635	4.8
Total votes		282,941	100.0
Democratic hold			

=== 2006 ===
2006 United States House of Representatives elections in California
Party	Candidate	Votes	%
Democratic	Mike Thompson (Incumbent)	144,409	66.3
Republican	John W. Jones	63,194	29.0
Green	Pamela Elizondo	6,899	3.1
Peace and Freedom	Timothy J. Stock	3,503	1.6
Total votes		218,044	100.0
Democratic hold			

=== 2008 ===
2008 United States House of Representatives elections in California
Party	Candidate	Votes	%
Democratic	Mike Thompson (Incumbent)	154,006	68.2
Republican	Zane Starkewolf	53,561	23.7
Green	Carol Wolman	18,492	8.1
Total votes		226,059	100.00
Democratic hold			

=== 2010 ===
2010 United States House of Representatives elections in California
Party	Candidate	Votes	%
Democratic	Mike Thompson (Incumbent)	136,605	62.8
Republican	Loren Hanks	67,217	31.1
Green	Carol Wolman	7,576	3.6
Libertarian	Mike Rodrigues	5,484	2.5
Total votes		216,882	100.0
Democratic hold			

=== 2012 ===
2012 United States House of Representatives elections in California
Party	Candidate	Votes	%
Republican	Doug LaMalfa	168,827	57.4
Democratic	Jim Reed	131,548	42.6
Total votes		294,213	100.0
Republican gain from Democratic			

=== 2014 ===
2014 United States House of Representatives elections in California
Party	Candidate	Votes	%
Republican	Doug LaMalfa (Incumbent)	132,052	61.0
Democratic	Heidi Hall	84,320	39.0
Total votes		216,372	100.0
Republican hold			

=== 2016 ===
2016 United States House of Representatives elections in California
Party	Candidate	Votes	%
Republican	Doug LaMalfa (Incumbent)	185,338	59.1
Democratic	Jim Reed	128,588	40.9
Total votes		314,036	100.0
Republican hold			

=== 2018 ===
2018 United States House of Representatives elections in California
Party	Candidate	Votes	%
Republican	Doug LaMalfa (Incumbent)	160,046	54.9
Democratic	Audrey Denney	131,548	45.1
Total votes		291,594	100.0
Republican hold			

=== 2020 ===
California's 1st district primary election, 2020
Party	Candidate	Votes	%
Republican	Doug LaMalfa (Incumbent)	128,613	54.6
Democratic	Audrey Denney	92,655	39.4
Democratic	Rob Lydon	8,745	3.7
Independent	Joseph LeTourneau IV	2,769	1.2
Independent	Gregory Edward Cheadle	2,596	1.1
Republican	Kenneth E Swanson (write-in)	13	0.0
Total votes		235,391	100.0

California's 1st district general election, 2020
Party	Candidate	Votes	%
Republican	Doug LaMalfa (incumbent)	204,190	57.0
Democratic	Audrey Denney	154,073	43.0
Total votes		358,263	100.0
Republican hold			

=== 2022 ===
California's 1st district primary election, 2022
Primary election
Party	Candidate	Votes	%
Republican	Doug LaMalfa (incumbent)	96,858	57.1
Democratic	Max Steiner	55,549	32.8
Republican	Tim Geist	11,408	6.7
No party preference	Rose Penelope Yee	5,777	3.4
Total votes		169,592	100.0
General election
Republican	Doug LaMalfa (incumbent)	152,839	62.1
Democratic	Max Steiner	93,386	37.9
Total votes		246,225	100.0
Republican hold			

=== 2024 ===
California's 1st congressional district, 2024
Primary election
Party	Candidate	Votes	%
Republican	Doug LaMalfa (incumbent)	122,858	66.7
Democratic	Rose Penelope Yee	41,669	22.6
Democratic	Mike Doran	19,734	10.7
Total votes		184,261	100.0
General election
Republican	Doug LaMalfa (incumbent)	208,592	65.3
Democratic	Rose Penelope Yee	110,636	34.7
Total votes		319,228	100.0
Republican hold			

=== 2026 (Special) ===
2026 California's 1st congressional district special election
Party	Candidate	Votes	%
Republican	James Gallagher	123,551	62.1
Democratic	Audrey Denney	36,841	18.5
Democratic	Mike McGuire	34,319	17.3
Republican	Jot Thiara	2,423	1.2
No party preference	Richard Montgomery	1,808	0.9
Total votes		198,942	100.0
Republican hold			

== See also ==
- List of United States congressional districts
- California's congressional districts
