= Eugene A. Chappie =

American politician (1920–1992)

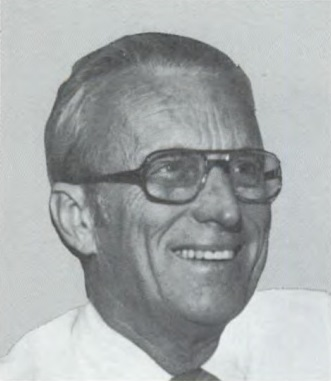

Member of the U.S. House of Representatives from California
- In office January 3, 1981 – January 3, 1987
- Preceded by: Harold T. Johnson
- Succeeded by: Wally Herger
- Constituency: 1st district (1981–1983); 2nd district (1983–1987)

Member of the California State Assembly from the 3rd district
- In office December 2, 1974 – December 1, 1980
- Preceded by: Leroy F. Greene
- Succeeded by: Wally Herger

Member of the California State Assembly from the 6th district
- In office December 7, 1964 – December 2, 1974
- Preceded by: Paul J. Lunardi
- Succeeded by: Leroy F. Greene

Personal details
- Born: Eugene Albert Chappie; March 28, 1920 Sacramento, California
- Died: May 31, 1992 (aged 72) Georgetown, California
- Party: Republican
- Spouse: Paula Di Benedetto (after 1941)
- Children: 5

Military service
- Allegiance: United States
- Branch/service: United States Army
- Rank: Captain
- Battles/wars: World War II; Korean War

Eugene Albert Chappie (March 28, 1920 – May 31, 1992) was a United States Congressman from California. He served three terms as a Republican between 1981 and 1987.

== Biography ==
Chappie was born in Sacramento, California. After graduating from high school, he joined the United States Army.

=== Military service ===
Chappie was promoted to the rank of captain while serving in the Pacific Theater during World War II. He returned home to work in agribusiness before serving in the military again, this time during the Korean War.

Chappie entered politics after his tour of duty ended in Korea.

=== Political career ===
He became an El Dorado County Supervisor in 1950. Chappie held this position until his was elected as a Republican to the California State Assembly in 1964.

In 1980, he ran for Congress, and he won the first of three terms. In that election, Chappie beat veteran Democratic incumbent Harold "Bizz" Johnson by almost 14 points, becoming the first Republican to represent this vast northern California district since 1942. He was helped by Ronald Reagan easily carrying the district.

=== Retirement and death ===
He retired in 1987 due to declining health and died on May 31, 1992.

== Electoral history ==
1980 United States House of Representatives elections
Party	Candidate	Votes	%
Republican	Eugene A. Chappie	145,098	53.7
Democratic	Harold T. Johnson (Incumbent)	107,682	39.8
Libertarian	Jim McClarin	17,419	6.5
Total votes		270,199	100.0
Turnout			
Republican gain from Democratic			

1982 United States House of Representatives elections in California, 2nd district
Party	Candidate	Votes	%
Republican	Eugene A. Chappie (incumbent)	116,172	57.9
Democratic	John Newmeyer	81,314	40.5
Peace and Freedom	Howard Fegarsky	3,126	1.6
Total votes		200,612	100.0
Turnout			
Republican hold			

1984 United States House of Representatives elections in California, 2nd district
Party	Candidate	Votes	%
Republican	Eugene A. Chappie (incumbent)	158,679	69.5
Democratic	Harry Cozad	69,793	30.5
Total votes		228,472	100.0
Turnout			
Republican hold			

California Assembly
Preceded by Paul J. Lunardi	California State Assemblyman, 6th District; 1964–1974	Succeeded by Leroy F. Greene
Preceded by Leroy F. Greene	California State Assemblyman, 3rd District; 1974–1980	Succeeded by Wally Herger
U.S. House of Representatives
Preceded by Harold T. Johnson	Member of the U.S. House of Representatives from California's 1st congressional district 1981–1983	Succeeded by Douglas H. Bosco
Preceded by Donald H. Clausen	Member of the U.S. House of Representatives from California's 2nd congressional district 1983–1987	Succeeded by Wally Herger
