= Bizz Johnson =

American politician

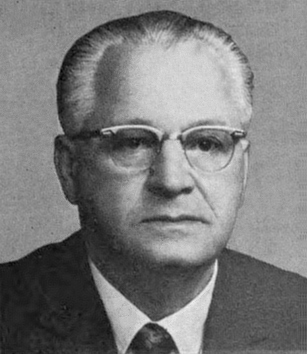

Chair of the House Committee on Public Works
- In office January 3, 1977 – January 3, 1981
- Preceded by: Robert E. Jones Jr.
- Succeeded by: James J. Howard

Member of the U.S. House of Representatives from California
- In office January 3, 1959 – January 3, 1981
- Preceded by: Clair Engle
- Succeeded by: Eugene A. Chappie
- Constituency: 2nd district (1959–1975); 1st district (1975–1981)

Member of the California Senate from the 7th district
- In office January 3, 1949 – January 3, 1959
- Preceded by: Allen G. Thurman
- Succeeded by: Ronald G. Cameron

Personal details
- Born: Harold Terry Johnson; December 2, 1907 Broderick, California, U.S.
- Died: March 16, 1988 (aged 80) Sacramento, California, U.S.
- Party: Democratic
- Spouse: Albra Irene Manuel (1937–1983; her death)
- Children: 2

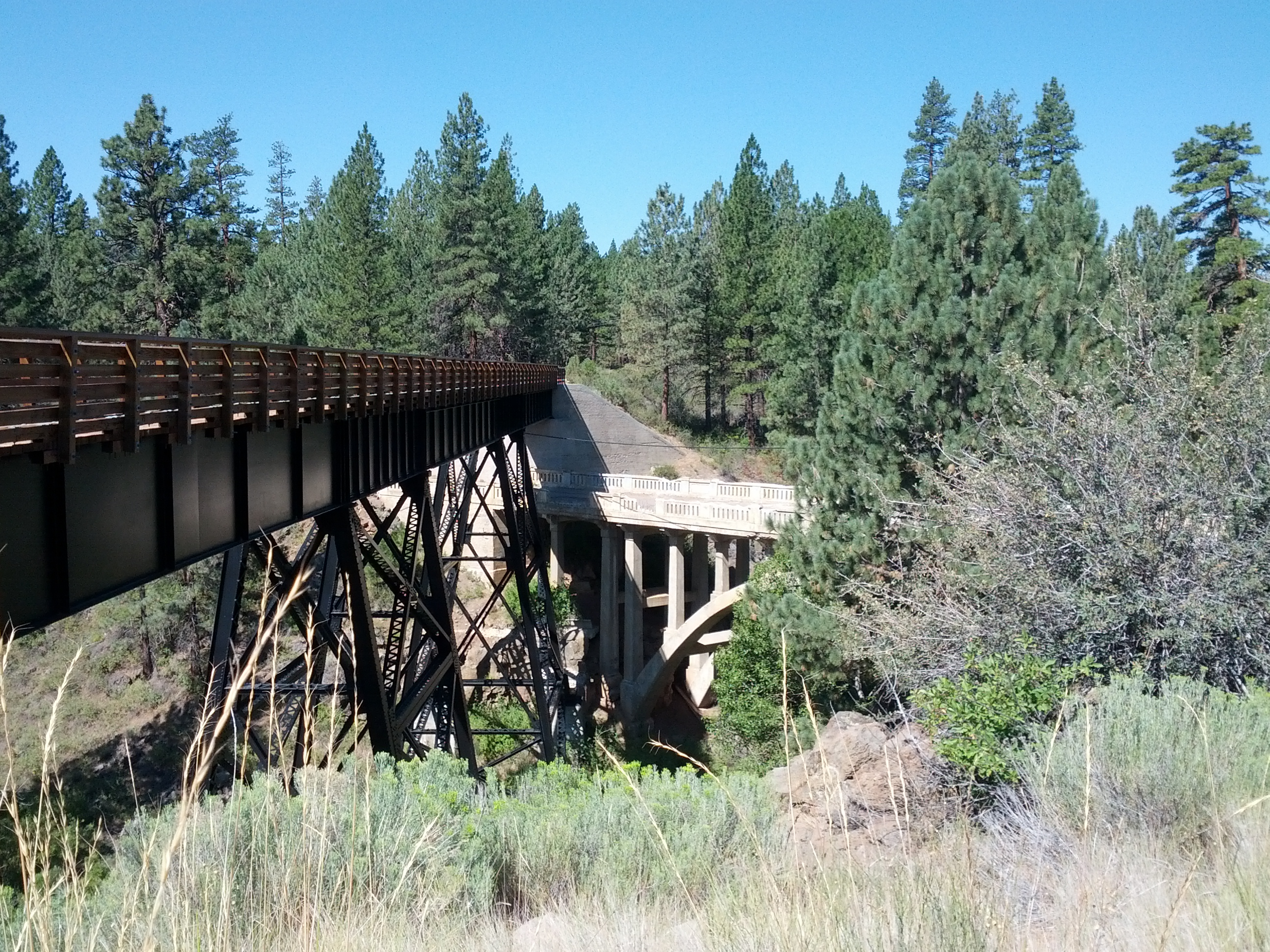
After the 7-mile marker along the Bizz Johnson trail

Harold Terry "Bizz" Johnson (December 2, 1907 – March 16, 1988) was an American businessman and politician who served as a United States Congressman from California from 1959 to 1981. He was a member of the Democratic Party.

== Biography ==
Born in Broderick, California, Johnson earned his lifelong nickname "Bizz" at age four when his uncle observed him leading the other children and compared him to Bismarck. He attended public school in Roseville and the University of Nevada. He worked for the Pacific Fruit Express Company, starting as a clerk before rising to a supervisory position, and was a district chairman of the Brotherhood of Railway Clerks.

Johnson entered politics as a trustee of the Roseville school board in 1941, was elected to the Roseville city council in 1943, and served as mayor of Roseville. In 1948, he was elected to the California State Senate representing Placer, Nevada and Sierra counties. In the legislature, he supported the creation of a four-lane highway across the Sierra Nevada that eventually became Interstate 80. He also sponsored legislation to ensure that the 1960 Winter Olympics would be held in Squaw Valley.

=== Congress ===
Johnson was elected to his first of eleven terms to the U.S. House of Representatives in 1958, eventually becoming chairman of the Committee on Public Works and Transportation in 1977. He was a proponent of the Auburn Dam on the American River, however the project never came to fruition. He was known as a stubborn negotiator and resisted efforts to transfer control of Washington Union Station from the Interior Department to the Transportation Department.

Johnson was reelected by comfortable margins, even as the district turned more conservative. However, Johnson lost reelection to Republican state assemblyman Eugene A. Chappie in 1980 on the back of former California Governor Ronald Reagan's strong victory in that year's presidential election, falling to only 32 percent of the vote. After his defeat, he continued to lobby for uncompleted projects that had been authorized when he in office.

=== Personal life ===
Johnson married Albra Irene Manuel of Roseville in 1937, remaining together to her death in 1983, and had a son and daughter. He died on March 16, 1988, at a Sacramento hospital at the age of 80.

== Legacy ==
- Highway 65 from Roseville to Lincoln is named the Harold T. Bizz Johnson Expressway.
- The interchange at U.S. Route 101 and State Route 92 is named the Harold T. Bizz Johnson Interchange.
- The multi-use trail linking Susanville to Westwood in Lassen County, California is named the Bizz Johnson Trail. Johnson led the transformation of the longest rail to trail project in California.

== Electoral history ==
Harold T. Johnson electoral history

1958 United States House of Representatives elections in California, 2nd district
Party	Candidate	Votes	%
Democratic	Harold T. Johnson	90,850	61.0
Republican	Curtis W. Tarr	58,199	39.0
Total votes		149,049	100
Turnout			
Democratic hold			

1960 United States House of Representatives elections in California, 2nd district
Party	Candidate	Votes	%
Democratic	Harold T. Johnson (incumbent)	109,565	62.7
Republican	Curtis W. Tarr	65,198	37.3
Total votes		174,763	100.0
Turnout			
Democratic hold			

1962 United States House of Representatives elections in California, 2nd district
Party	Candidate	Votes	%
Democratic	Harold T. Johnson (incumbent)	106,239	64.6
Republican	Frederic H. Nagel	58,150	35.4
Total votes		164,389	100.0
Turnout			
Democratic hold			

1964 United States House of Representatives elections in California, 2nd district
Party	Candidate	Votes	%
Democratic	Harold T. Johnson (incumbent)	125,774	64.6
Republican	Chester C. Merriam	68,835	35.4
Total votes		194,609	100.0
Turnout			
Democratic hold			

1966 United States House of Representatives elections in California, 2nd district
Party	Candidate	Votes	%
Democratic	Harold T. Johnson (incumbent)	131,145	70.9
Republican	William H. Romack, Jr.	53,753	29.1
Total votes		184,898	100.0
Turnout			
Democratic hold			

1968 United States House of Representatives elections in California, 2nd district
Party	Candidate	Votes	%
Democratic	Harold T. Johnson (incumbent)	127,880	60.8
Republican	Osmer E. Dunaway	78,986	37.5
American Independent	Paul J. Huft	3,577	1.7
Total votes		210,443	100.0
Turnout			
Democratic hold			

1970 United States House of Representatives elections in California, 2nd district
Party	Candidate	Votes	%
Democratic	Harold T. Johnson (incumbent)	151,070	77.9
Republican	Lloyd E. Gilbert	37,223	19.2
American Independent	Jack R. Carrigg	5,681	2.9
Total votes		193,974	100.0
Turnout			
Democratic hold			

1972 United States House of Representatives elections in California, 2nd district
Party	Candidate	Votes	%
Democratic	Harold T. Johnson (incumbent)	148,808	68.3
Republican	Francis X. Callahan	62,381	28.6
American Independent	Dorothy D. Paradis	6,688	3.1
Total votes		217,877	100.0
Turnout			
Democratic hold			

1974 United States House of Representatives elections
Party	Candidate	Votes	%
Democratic	Harold T. Johnson (Incumbent)	137,849	85.8
American Independent	Dorothy D. Paradis	22,628	14.2
Total votes		160,477	100.0
Democratic hold			

1976 United States House of Representatives elections
Party	Candidate	Votes	%
Democratic	Harold T. Johnson (Incumbent)	160,477	73.9
Republican	James E. Taylor	56,539	26.1
Total votes		217,016	100.0
Democratic hold			

1978 United States House of Representatives elections
Party	Candidate	Votes	%
Democratic	Harold T. Johnson (Incumbent)	125,122	59.4
Republican	James E. Taylor	85,690	40.6
Total votes		210,812	100.0
Democratic hold			

1980 United States House of Representatives elections
Party	Candidate	Votes	%
Republican	Eugene A. Chappie	145,098	53.7
Democratic	Harold T. Johnson (Incumbent)	107,682	39.8
Libertarian	Jim McClarin	17,419	6.5
Total votes		270,199	100.0
Republican gain from Democratic			

Political offices
Preceded by Jerrold Seawell	Member California State Senate, 7th District; 1949–1958	Succeeded by Ronald G. Cameron
U.S. House of Representatives
Preceded by Clair Engle	Member of the U.S. House of Representatives from California's 2nd congressional district 1959–1975	Succeeded by Donald H. Clausen
Preceded by Donald H. Clausen	Member of the U.S. House of Representatives from California's 1st congressional district 1975–1981	Succeeded by Eugene A. Chappie
Preceded by Robert E. Jones; Alabama	Chairman of House Transportation Committee; 1977–1981	Succeeded by James J. Howard; New Jersey
