= Clem Miller =

American politician

Clement Woodnutt Miller
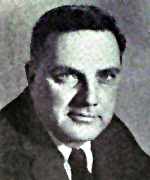

Member of the U.S. House of Representatives from California's 1st district
- In office January 3, 1959 – October 7, 1962
- Preceded by: Hubert B. Scudder
- Succeeded by: Don H. Clausen

Personal details
- Born: Clement Woodnutt Miller; October 28, 1916 Wilmington, Delaware, U.S.
- Died: October 7, 1962 (aged 45) near Eureka, California, U.S.
- Resting place: Point Reyes National Seashore, north of San Francisco, California.
- Party: Democratic
- Spouse: Katharine Southerland Miller
- Education: Lawrenceville School, Williams College

Clement Woodnutt Miller (October 28, 1916 – October 7, 1962) was an American World War II veteran and politician who served two terms as a U.S. representative from California from 1959 to 1962. He was killed in a plane crash during his second term in office.

== Early life and career ==
Clement Miller was born in Wilmington, Delaware, on October 28, 1916. He graduated from the Lawrenceville School, from Williams College, Williamstown, Massachusetts, in 1940, and briefly attended Cornell University School of Industrial and Labor Relations in 1946.

=== World War II ===
He enlisted in the United States Army in 1940, serving as a private in the 258th Field Artillery Regiment. He was discharged in 1945 as a captain. During his military career, he had service in the Netherlands and Germany.

=== After the war ===
He became a veterans service officer in Nevada in 1946 and an employment service official for the State of Nevada, in 1947. He then became a field examiner and hearing officer for the National Labor Relations Board for Northern California from 1948 to 1953.

He became a landscape consultant in 1954.

== Tenure in Congress ==
He ran for Congress in 1956 but was unsuccessful. He ran again in 1958 and was elected as a Democrat to the Eighty-sixth Congress. In 1960, he was re-elected to the Eighty-seventh Congress. Of note, Miller authored the legislation that established Point Reyes National Seashore.

=== Death and burial ===
He served in Congress from January 3, 1959, until his death in an airplane accident near Eureka, California, on October 7, 1962. He was interred in Point Reyes National Seashore, north of San Francisco, California.

== Legacy ==
He was a grandson of Charles R. Miller and a nephew of Thomas W. Miller, and the grandfather of poet and rapper George Watsky.

In 1962, was elected posthumously to the Eighty-eighth Congress. A special election was held in 1963 and the seat was filled by Donald Clausen, Miller’s opposition in the 1962 general election.

He was the author of the book Member of the House: Letters of a Congressman.

== Electoral history ==
1956 United States House of Representatives elections
Party	Candidate	Votes	%
Republican	Hubert B. Scudder (Incumbent)	102,604	53.6
Democratic	Clement Woodnutt Miller	88,962	46.4
Total votes		191,566	100.0
Turnout			
Republican hold			

1958 United States House of Representatives elections
Party	Candidate	Votes	%
Democratic	Clement Woodnutt Miller	102,096	54.9
Republican	Frederick G. Dupuis	84,807	45.1
Total votes		185,903	100.0
Turnout			
Democratic gain from Republican			

1960 United States House of Representatives elections
Party	Candidate	Votes	%
Democratic	Clement Woodnutt Miller (Incumbent)	115,829	51.6
Republican	Frederick G. Dupuis	108,505	48.4
Total votes		224,334	100.0
Turnout			
Democratic hold			

1962 United States House of Representatives elections
Party	Candidate	Votes	%
Democratic	Clement Woodnutt Miller (Incumbent)	100,962	50.8
Republican	Donald H. Clausen	97,949	49.2
Total votes		198,911	100.0
Turnout			
Democratic hold			

== See also ==
- List of members of the United States Congress who died in office (1950–1999)

U.S. House of Representatives
Preceded by Hubert B. Scudder	Member of the U.S. House of Representatives from California's 1st congressional district 1959–1962	Succeeded by Don H. Clausen
