= Don Clausen =

American politician (1923–2015)

Donald Clausen
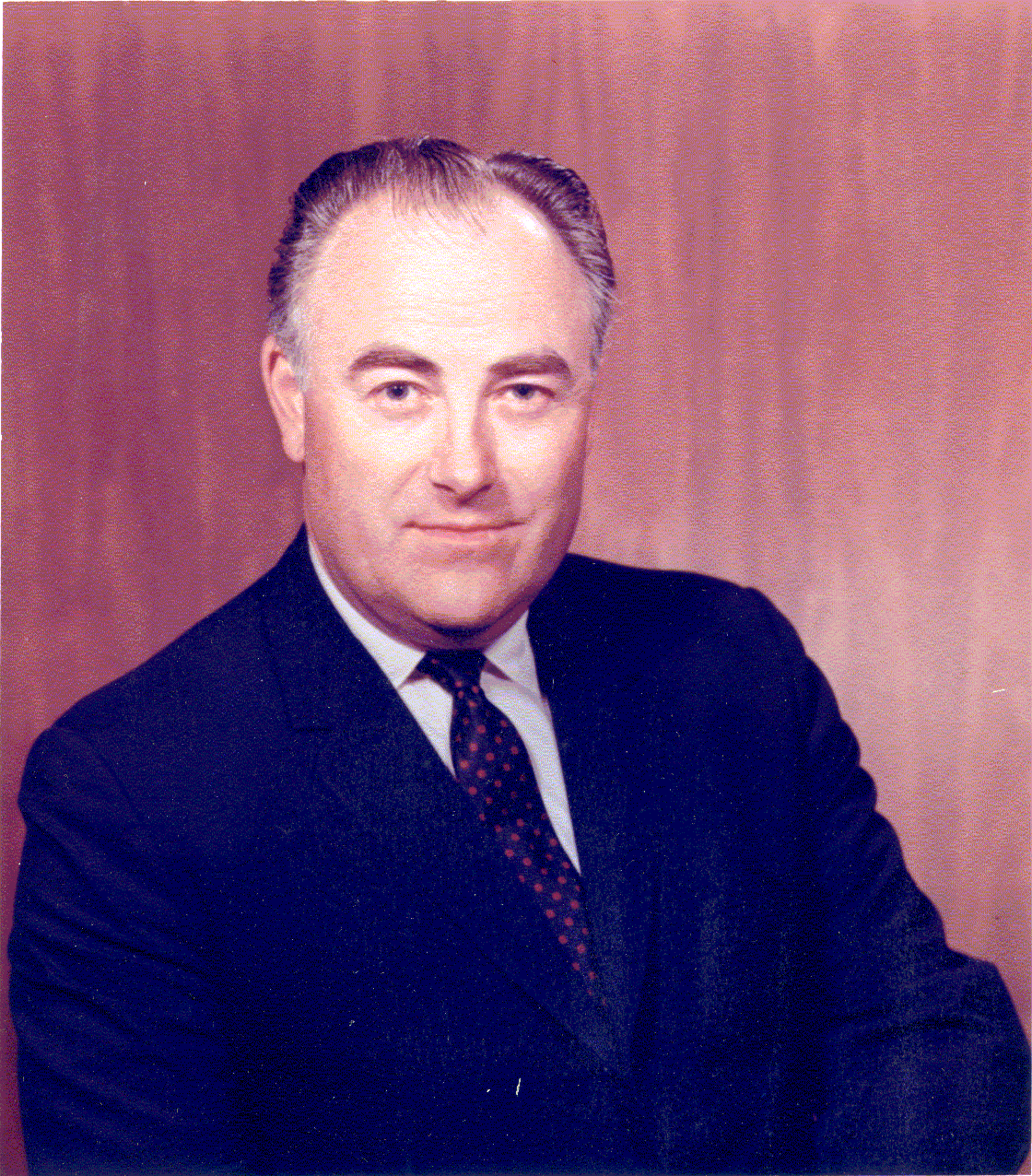

Member of the U.S. House of Representatives from California
- In office January 22, 1963 – January 3, 1983
- Preceded by: Clement W. Miller
- Succeeded by: Douglas H. Bosco (Redistricting)
- Constituency: 1st district (1963–1975); 2nd district (1975–1983)

Personal details
- Born: Donald Holst Clausen; April 27, 1923 Ferndale, California, U.S.
- Died: February 7, 2015 (aged 91) Fortuna, California, U.S.
- Party: Republican
- Spouse: Jessie Oleva Piper
- Profession: Businessman

Military service
- Allegiance: United States
- Branch/service: United States Navy
- Battles/wars: Pacific Theater, World War II

Donald Holst Clausen (April 27, 1923 – February 7, 2015) was an American businessman, World War II veteran, and politician who served ten terms as a U.S. representative from California from 1963 to 1983.

== Early life and education ==
Clausen was born in Ferndale, California on 27 April 1923. He attended Ferndale Elementary School and graduated from Ferndale High School. He was an honors student and lettered in five sports: tennis, track, basketball, football, and baseball. He also served as the drum major of the school band. For university, Clausen attended San José State University, California Polytechnic State University (in San Luis Obispo, California), Weber State University (in Ogden, Utah), and Saint Mary's College of California.

== Career ==
=== World War II and post-war ===
Upon graduation, Clausen took part in the U.S. Navy V5 Aviation Cadet Program. He served as a carrier pilot in the Asiatic-Pacific Theater of the Second World War from 1944 to 1945, flying F4U Corsair aircraft.

After the war ended, Clausen helped found the Del Norte County Airport, and served as a member of the board of supervisors of Del Norte County, California, from 1955 to 1962. He ran two companies in Crescent City, his insurance business, Clausen Associates, and Clausen Flying Service, an air ambulance service. It was from Crescent City that he first served Congress.

=== Congress ===
Clausen was elected as a Republican to the Eighty-eighth Congress to fill the vacancy caused by the death of United States Representative Clement Woodnutt Miller (who had been re-elected posthumously), and to the nine succeeding Congresses (January 22, 1963 – January 3, 1983).

Clausen authored the bill creating the Lady Bird Johnson Grove in the Redwood National Park. Former president Lyndon Johnson and Lady Bird Johnson, sitting president Richard Nixon, and future president Ronald Reagan and many other federal and local dignitaries attended the dedication of the grove. Clausen said that this was his proudest accomplishment. Clausen voted in favor of the Civil Rights Acts of 1964, and the Voting Rights Act of 1965. He voted for the initial House Resolution for the Civil Rights Act of 1968 but voted against the accepting the final Senate amendments to the Act.

He was an unsuccessful candidate for reelection to the Ninety-eighth Congress in 1982, narrowly losing to Democrat Douglas H. Bosco. He served as director, special programs, Federal Aviation Administration from 1983 to 1990 and was a resident of Santa Rosa, California, after his Congressional tenure ended.

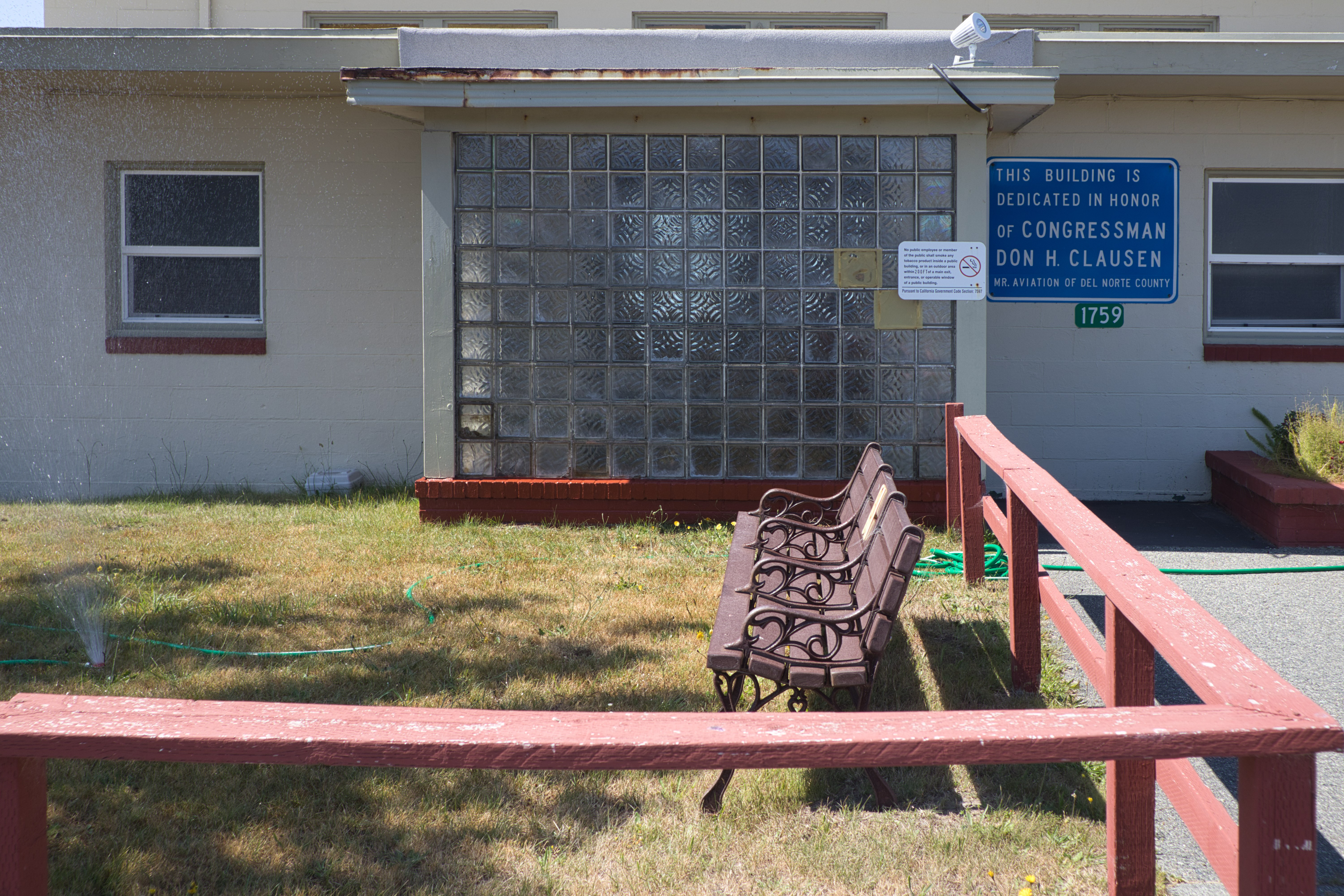
A building at the Del Norte County Airport is one of the many sites dedicated to Clausen.

The Don Clausen Fish Hatchery in Sonoma County was named in his honor and the Redwood National Park Bypass on US Highway 101 was renamed the Don Clausen Highway in 1996 by act of the California Legislature due to his efforts at obtaining appropriations for building that road and the Redwood National Park Visitor Center.

=== Death and legacy ===
Clausen died in a hospital on February 7, 2015, in Fortuna, California, from complications of diabetes, chronic obstructive pulmonary disease (COPD), and heart and lung disease. His congressional papers are archived at Humboldt State University library and his congressional desk and other office memorabilia are exhibited at the Ferndale Museum.

== Electoral history ==
1962 United States House of Representatives elections
Party	Candidate	Votes	%
Democratic	Clement Woodnutt Miller (Incumbent)	100,962	50.8
Republican	Donald H. Clausen	97,949	49.2
Total votes		198,911	100.0
Turnout			
Democratic hold			

1963 Special election
Party	Candidate	Votes	%
Republican	Don H. Clausen		54.2
Democratic	William F. Grader		44.7
Democratic	John C. Stuart (write-in)		1.1
Total votes			100.0
Turnout			
Republican gain from Democratic			

1964 United States House of Representatives elections
Party	Candidate	Votes	%
Republican	Donald H. Clausen (Incumbent)	141,048	59.1
Democratic	George McCabe	97,651	40.9
Total votes		238,699	100.0
Turnout			
Republican hold			

1966 United States House of Representatives elections
Party	Candidate	Votes	%
Republican	Donald H. Clausen (Incumbent)	143,755	65.1
Democratic	Thomas T. Storer	77,000	34.9
Total votes		220,755	100.0
Turnout			
Republican hold			

1968 United States House of Representatives elections
Party	Candidate	Votes	%
Republican	Donald H. Clausen (Incumbent)	132,433	75.1
Democratic	Donald W. Graham	37,650	21.4
Peace and Freedom	Adolph N. Hofmann	3,372	1.9
American Independent	Gladys O'Neil	2,882	1.6
Total votes		176,337	100.0
Turnout			
Republican hold			

1970 United States House of Representatives elections
Party	Candidate	Votes	%
Republican	Donald H. Clausen (Incumbent)	108,358	63.5
Democratic	William Kortum	62,688	36.5
Total votes		171,046	100.0
Turnout			
Republican hold			

1972 United States House of Representatives elections
Party	Candidate	Votes	%
Republican	Donald H. Clausen (Incumbent)	140,807	62.2
Democratic	William A. Nighswonger	77,138	34.1
Peace and Freedom	Jonathan T. Ames	8,470	3.7
Total votes		226,145	100.0
Turnout			
Republican hold			

1974 United States House of Representatives elections in California, 2nd district
Party	Candidate	Votes	%
Republican	Donald H. Clausen (incumbent)	95,508	53
Democratic	Oscar H. Klee	76,951	42.7
Peace and Freedom	Carole J. Glass	7,719	4.3
Total votes		180,178	100.0
Turnout			
Republican hold			

1976 United States House of Representatives elections in California, 2nd district
Party	Candidate	Votes	%
Republican	Donald H. Clausen (incumbent)	121,290	56.0
Democratic	Oscar H. Klee	88,829	41.0
Peace and Freedom	Robert B. "Bob" Allred	6,444	3.0
Total votes		216,563	100
Turnout			
Republican hold			

1978 United States House of Representatives elections in California, 2nd district
Party	Candidate	Votes	%
Republican	Donald H. Clausen (incumbent)	114,451	52.0
Democratic	Norma Bork	99,712	45.3
Peace and Freedom	Irv Sutley	6,097	2.8
Total votes		220,260	100.0
Turnout			
Republican hold			

1980 United States House of Representatives elections in California, 2nd district
Party	Candidate	Votes	%
Republican	Donald H. Clausen (incumbent)	141,698	54.2
Democratic	Norma K. Bork	109,789	42.0
Libertarian	Daniel Mosier	6,833	2.6
Peace and Freedom	Linda D. Wren	3,354	1.3
Total votes		261,674	100.0
Turnout			
Republican hold			

California's 1st congressional district election, 1982
Party	Candidate	Votes	%
Democratic	Douglas H. Bosco	107,749	49.85
Republican	Don H. Clausen (incumbent)	102,043	47.21
Libertarian	David Redick	6,374	2.95
Total votes		216,166	100.00
Turnout			
Democratic gain from Republican			

U.S. House of Representatives
Preceded by Clement Woodnutt Miller	Member of the U.S. House of Representatives from California's 1st congressional district 1963–1975	Succeeded by Harold T. Johnson
Preceded by Harold T. Johnson	Member of the U.S. House of Representatives from California's 2nd congressional district 1975–1983	Succeeded by Eugene A. Chappie
