= Ronald G. Cameron =

American politician

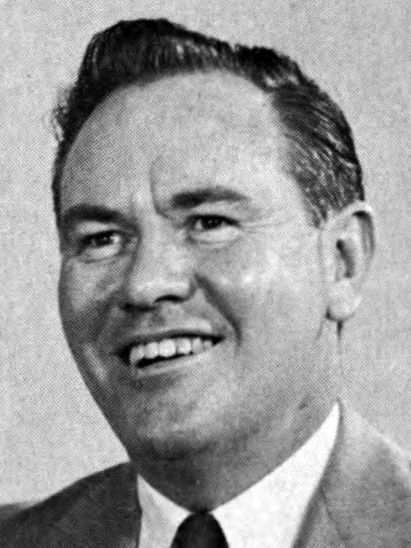

Member of the California Senate from the 7th district
- In office April 20, 1959 – September 3, 1963
- Preceded by: Harold T. Johnson
- Succeeded by: Paul J. Lunardi

Personal details
- Born: September 10, 1917 New Brunswick, Canada
- Died: September 14, 2004 (aged 87) Roseville, California, U.S.
- Party: Democratic
- Spouse(s): Irene Madaras (div. 1962) Lorraine Chappell (div. 1968) Sandy Warwick Cameron (died 2002)
- Children: 3

Military service
- Branch/service: United States Army
- Battles/wars: World War II

Ronald G. Cameron (September 10, 1917 – September 14, 2004) served in the California State Senate representing the 7th District from 1959 to 1963. During World War II he served in the United States Army. Cameron was born in Canada.
