= California's 22nd congressional district =

U.S. House district for California

Coordinates: 35.2°N 119.9°W

- Interactive map of district boundaries
- Representative: David Valadao; R–Hanford
- Population (2025): 796,010
- Median household income: $61,586
- Ethnicity: 73.2% Hispanic; 15.8% White; 4.5% Black; 3.6% Asian; 1.8% Two or more races; 1.1% other
- Cook PVI: R+1

California's 22nd congressional district is a congressional district in the U.S. state of California. It is represented by David Valadao, who lost to Randy Villegas during the 2026 midterm elections. Following redistricting in 2021, the district is located in the San Joaquin Valley. It includes most of Kings County and parts of Tulare and Kern counties. It includes the east side of Bakersfield; the west and south sides of Tulare, the south side of Hanford; and all of Porterville, Lindsay, Shafter, Wasco, Delano, McFarland, Arvin, Lamont, and Corcoran. The new 22nd is a majority-Latino district.

In the 2025 edition of the Cook Partisan Voting Index California's 22nd was rated as the median district of the country, with 217 districts rated more Democratic and 217 more Republican.

As of October 2024, the district had a Medicaid enrollment rate of 68%, the highest in the country and the highest rate by a wide margin among districts represented by Republicans.

== Recent election results from statewide races ==
=== 2023–2027 boundaries ===
Year	Office	Results
2008	President	Obama 52% - 47%
2010	Governor	Brown 48% - 44%
2010	Lt. Governor	Maldonado 52% - 36%
2010	Secretary of State	Bowen 46% - 44%
2010	Attorney General	Cooley 51% - 38%
2010	Treasurer	Lockyer 51% - 40%
2010	Controller	Chiang 50% - 40%
2012	President	Obama 55% - 43%
2014	Governor	Brown 53% - 47%
2016	President	Clinton 55% - 39%
2018	Governor	Newsom 54% - 46%
2018	Attorney General	Becerra 57% - 43%
2020	President	Biden 55% - 42%
2022	Senate (Reg.)	Padilla 51% - 49%
2022	Governor	Dahle 52% - 48%
2022	Lt. Governor	Underwood Jacobs 51% - 49%
2022	Secretary of State	Weber 50.3% - 49.7%
2022	Attorney General	Hochman 50.1% - 49.9%
2022	Treasurer	Guerrero 51% - 49%
2022	Controller	Chen 52% - 48%
2024	President	Trump 52% - 46%
2024	Senate (Reg.)	Garvey 53% - 47%

=== 2027–2033 boundaries ===
Year	Office	Results
2008	President	Obama 55% - 44%
2010	Governor	Brown 49% - 44%
2010	Lt. Governor	Maldonado 51% - 37%
2010	Secretary of State	Bowen 47% - 43%
2010	Attorney General	Cooley 50% - 40%
2010	Treasurer	Lockyer 52% - 40%
2010	Controller	Chiang 51% - 39%
2012	President	Obama 58% - 42%
2014	Governor	Brown 55% - 45%
2016	President	Clinton 58% - 37%
2018	Governor	Newsom 56% - 44%
2018	Attorney General	Becerra 59% - 41%
2020	President	Biden 57% - 40%
2022	Senate (Reg.)	Padilla 54% - 46%
2022	Governor	Newsom 50.2% - 49.8%
2022	Lt. Governor	Kounalakis 51% - 49%
2022	Secretary of State	Weber 53% - 47%
2022	Attorney General	Bonta 52% - 48%
2022	Treasurer	Ma 51% - 49%
2022	Controller	Cohen 50.3% - 49.7%
2024	President	Trump 50% - 48%
2024	Senate (Reg.)	Garvey 50.5% - 49.5%

== Composition ==
FIPS County Code	County	Seat	Population
29	Kern	Bakersfield	913,820
31	Kings	Hanford	152,682
107	Tulare	Visalia	479,468

=== Cities and CDPs with 10,000 or more people ===
- Bakersfield – 403,455
- Tulare – 68,875
- Porterville – 62,742
- Hanford – 57,990
- Delano – 51,428
- Oildale – 36,135
- East Niles – 28,390
- Edison – 28,390
- Wasco – 27,047
- Corcoran – 22,339
- Shafter – 19,953
- Arvin – 19,495
- Greenfield – 18,937
- McFarland – 14,161
- Lamont – 14,049
- Avenal – 13,696
- Lindsay – 12,659
- Hillcrest – 10,528

=== 2,500 – 10,000 people ===
- East Bakersfield – 9,749
- Potomac Park – 9,164
- La Cresta – 8,787
- Earlimart – 7,679
- Fairfax – 7,605
- Cottonwood – 6,268
- East Porterville – 5,549
- Benton Park – 5,333
- Armona – 4,274
- Old Stine – 3,841
- Pixley – 3,828
- Rexland Acres – 3,563
- Greenfield – 3,447
- Strathmore – 3,033
- Terra Bella – 2,910
- Weedpatch – 2,658
- Richgrove – 2,538
- Tipton – 2,519

== Future composition ==
Beginning with the 2026 election, the 22nd district will consist of the following counties:

- Fresno (part)
- Kern (part)
- Kings (part)
- Madera (part)
- Tulare (part)

== List of members representing the district ==
Member	Party	Dates	Cong ress(es)	Electoral history	District location (counties)
District created January 3, 1943
John J. Phillips (Banning)	Republican	January 3, 1943 – January 3, 1953	78th 79th 80th 81st 82nd	Elected in 1942. Re-elected in 1944. Re-elected in 1946. Re-elected in 1948. Re-elected in 1950. Redistricted to the 29th district.	1943–1953; Imperial, Orange, Riverside
Joseph F. Holt (Los Angeles)	Republican	January 3, 1953 – January 3, 1961	83rd 84th 85th 86th	Elected in 1952. Re-elected in 1954. Re-elected in 1956. Re-elected in 1958. Retired.	1953–1983; Los Angeles
James C. Corman (Los Angeles)	Democratic	January 3, 1961 – January 3, 1975	87th 88th 89th 90th 91st 92nd 93rd	Elected in 1960. Re-elected in 1962. Re-elected in 1964. Re-elected in 1966. Re-elected in 1968. Re-elected in 1970. Re-elected in 1972. Redistricted to the 21st district.	1953–1983; Los Angeles
Carlos J. Moorhead (Glendale)	Republican	January 3, 1975 – January 3, 1993	94th 95th 96th 97th 98th 99th 100th 101st 102nd	Redistricted from the 20th district and re-elected in 1974. Re-elected in 1976. Re-elected in 1978. Re-elected in 1980. Re-elected in 1982. Re-elected in 1984. Re-elected in 1986. Re-elected in 1988. Re-elected in 1990. Redistricted to the 27th district.	1953–1983; Los Angeles
Carlos J. Moorhead (Glendale)	Republican	January 3, 1975 – January 3, 1993	94th 95th 96th 97th 98th 99th 100th 101st 102nd	Redistricted from the 20th district and re-elected in 1974. Re-elected in 1976. Re-elected in 1978. Re-elected in 1980. Re-elected in 1982. Re-elected in 1984. Re-elected in 1986. Re-elected in 1988. Re-elected in 1990. Redistricted to the 27th district.	1983–1993; Los Angeles (northern L.A. suburbs)
Michael Huffington (Santa Barbara)	Republican	January 3, 1993 – January 3, 1995	103rd	Elected in 1992. Retired to run for U.S. senator.	1993–2003; San Luis Obispo, Santa Barbara
Andrea Seastrand (Pismo Beach)	Republican	January 3, 1995 – January 3, 1997	104th	Elected in 1994. Lost re-election.	1993–2003; San Luis Obispo, Santa Barbara
Walter Capps (Santa Barbara)	Democratic	January 3, 1997 – October 28, 1997	105th	Elected in 1996. Died.	1993–2003; San Luis Obispo, Santa Barbara
Vacant		October 28, 1997 – March 17, 1998	105th		1993–2003; San Luis Obispo, Santa Barbara
Lois Capps (Santa Barbara)	Democratic	March 17, 1998 – January 3, 2003	105th 106th 107th	Elected to finish her husband's term. Re-elected later in 1998. Re-elected in 2000. Redistricted to the 23rd district.	1993–2003; San Luis Obispo, Santa Barbara
Bill Thomas (Bakersfield)	Republican	January 3, 2003 – January 3, 2007	108th 109th	Redistricted from the 21st district and re-elected in 2002. Re-elected in 2004. Retired.	2003–2013 Kern, Los Angeles (Lancaster), inland San Luis Obispo
Kevin McCarthy (Bakersfield)	Republican	January 3, 2007 – January 3, 2013	110th 111th 112th	Elected in 2006. Re-elected in 2008. Re-elected in 2010. Redistricted to the 23rd district.	2003–2013 Kern, Los Angeles (Lancaster), inland San Luis Obispo
Devin Nunes (Tulare)	Republican	January 3, 2013 – January 1, 2022	113th 114th 115th 116th 117th	Redistricted from the 21st district and re-elected in 2012. Re-elected in 2014. Re-elected in 2016. Re-elected in 2018. Re-elected in 2020. Resigned to become CEO of Trump Media & Technology Group.	2013–2023 Fresno, Tulare (Fresno, Clovis, Tulare, Visalia)
Vacant		January 1, 2022 – June 14, 2022	117th		2013–2023 Fresno, Tulare (Fresno, Clovis, Tulare, Visalia)
Connie Conway (Tulare)	Republican	June 14, 2022 – January 3, 2023	117th	Elected to finish Nunes' term. Redistricted to the 20th district and retired.	2013–2023 Fresno, Tulare (Fresno, Clovis, Tulare, Visalia)
David Valadao (Hanford)	Republican	January 3, 2023 – present	118th 119th	Redistricted from the 21st district and re-elected in 2022. Re-elected in 2024. Lost re-election.	2023–2027 Kings, Tulare, and Kern
Randy Villegas (Visalia)	Democratic	Assuming office on January 3, 2027		Elected in 2026.	

== Election results ==
=== 1942 ===
1942 United States House of Representatives elections in California
Party	Candidate	Votes	%
Republican	John J. Phillips	42,765	57.6%
Democratic	N. E. West	31,440	42.4%
Total votes		74,205	100.0%
Turnout			
Republican win (new seat)			

=== 1944 ===
1944 United States House of Representatives elections in California
Party	Candidate	Votes	%
Republican	John J. Phillips (incumbent)	88,537	100.0%
Turnout			
Republican hold			

=== 1946 ===
1946 United States House of Representatives elections in California
Party	Candidate	Votes	%
Republican	John J. Phillips (incumbent)	59,935	62.1%
Democratic	Ray Adkinson	36,649	37.9%
Total votes		96,584	100.0%
Turnout			
Republican hold			

=== 1948 ===
1948 United States House of Representatives elections in California
Party	Candidate	Votes	%
Republican	John J. Phillips (incumbent)	115,697	100.0%
Turnout			
Republican hold			

=== 1950 ===
1950 United States House of Representatives elections in California
Party	Candidate	Votes	%
Republican	John J. Phillips (incumbent)	114,497	100.0%
Turnout			
Republican hold			

=== 1952 ===
1952 United States House of Representatives elections in California
Party	Candidate	Votes	%
Republican	Joseph F. Holt	85,039	60.5%
Democratic	Dean E. McHenry	55,534	39.5%
Total votes		140,573	100.0%
Turnout			
Republican win (new seat)			

=== 1954 ===
1954 United States House of Representatives elections in California
Party	Candidate	Votes	%
Republican	Joseph F. Holt (incumbent)	65,165	58.2%
Democratic	William M. "Bill" Costley	46,875	41.8%
Total votes		112,040	100.0%
Turnout			
Republican hold			

=== 1956 ===
1956 United States House of Representatives elections in California
Party	Candidate	Votes	%
Republican	Joseph F. Holt (incumbent)	97,317	59.8%
Democratic	Irving Glasband	65,314	40.2%
Total votes		162,631	100.0%
Turnout			
Republican hold			

=== 1958 ===
1958 United States House of Representatives elections in California
Party	Candidate	Votes	%
Republican	Joseph F. Holt (incumbent)	87,785	55.4%
Democratic	Irving Glasband	70,777	44.6%
Total votes		158,562	100.0%
Turnout			
Republican hold			

=== 1960 ===
1960 United States House of Representatives elections in California
Party	Candidate	Votes	%
Democratic	James C. Corman	104,919	51.1%
Republican	Lemoine Blanchard	100,321	48.9%
Total votes		205,240	100.0%
Turnout			
Democratic gain from Republican			

=== 1962 ===
1962 United States House of Representatives elections in California
Party	Candidate	Votes	%
Democratic	James C. Corman (incumbent)	75,294	53.6%
Republican	Charles S. Foote	65,087	46.4%
Total votes		140,381	100.0%
Turnout			
Democratic hold			

=== 1964 ===
1964 United States House of Representatives elections in California
Party	Candidate	Votes	%
Democratic	James C. Corman (incumbent)	94,141	50.5%
Republican	Robert C. Cline	92,133	49.5%
Total votes		186,274	100.0%
Turnout			
Democratic hold			

=== 1966 ===
1966 United States House of Representatives elections in California
Party	Candidate	Votes	%
Democratic	James C. Corman (incumbent)	94,420	53.5%
Republican	Robert C. Cline	82,207	46.5%
Total votes		176,627	100.0%
Turnout			
Democratic hold			

=== 1968 ===
1968 United States House of Representatives elections in California
Party	Candidate	Votes	%
Democratic	James C. Corman (incumbent)	102,332	56.9%
Republican	Joe Holt	74,433	41.4%
Peace and Freedom	Hugh Manes	3,024	1.7%
Total votes		179,789	100.0%
Turnout			
Democratic hold			

=== 1970 ===
1970 United States House of Representatives elections in California
Party	Candidate	Votes	%
Democratic	James C. Corman (incumbent)	95,256	59.4%
Republican	Tom Hayden	63,297	39.5%
American Independent	Callis R. Johnson	1,880	1.1%
Total votes		160,433	100.0%
Turnout			
Democratic hold			

=== 1972 ===
1972 United States House of Representatives elections in California
Party	Candidate	Votes	%
Democratic	James C. Corman (incumbent)	121,352	67.6%
Republican	Bruce P. Wolfe	52,664	29.3%
Peace and Freedom	Ralph L. Shroyer	5,583	3.1%
Total votes		179,599	100.0%
Turnout			
Democratic hold			

=== 1974 ===
1974 United States House of Representatives elections in California
Party	Candidate	Votes	%
Republican	Carlos Moorhead (incumbent)	78,983	55.8%
Democratic	Richard Hallin	62,770	44.2%
Total votes		141,753	100.0%
Turnout			
Republican gain from Democratic			

=== 1976 ===
1976 United States House of Representatives elections in California
Party	Candidate	Votes	%
Republican	Carlos Moorhead (incumbent)	114,769	62.6%
Democratic	Robert S. Henry	68,543	37.4%
Total votes		183,312	100.0%
Turnout			
Republican hold			

=== 1978 ===
1978 United States House of Representatives elections in California
Party	Candidate	Votes	%
Republican	Carlos Moorhead (incumbent)	99,502	64.6%
Democratic	Robert S. Henry	54,442	35.4%
Total votes		153,944	100.0%
Turnout			
Republican hold			

=== 1980 ===
1980 United States House of Representatives elections in California
Party	Candidate	Votes	%
Republican	Carlos Moorhead (incumbent)	115,241	63.9%
Democratic	Pierce O'Donnell	57,477	31.9%
Libertarian	William V. Susel	7,705	4.3%
Total votes		180,423	100.0%
Turnout			
Republican hold			

=== 1982 ===
1982 United States House of Representatives elections in California
Party	Candidate	Votes	%
Republican	Carlos Moorhead (incumbent)	145,831	73.6%
Democratic	Harvey L. Goldhammer	46,521	23.5%
Libertarian	Robert T. Gerringer	5,870	3.0%
Total votes		198,222	100.0%
Turnout			
Republican hold			

=== 1984 ===
1984 United States House of Representatives elections in California
Party	Candidate	Votes	%
Republican	Carlos Moorhead (incumbent)	184,981	85.2%
Libertarian	Michael B. Yauch	32,036	14.8%
Total votes		217,017	100.0%
Turnout			
Republican hold			

=== 1986 ===
1986 United States House of Representatives elections in California
Party	Candidate	Votes	%
Republican	Carlos Moorhead (incumbent)	141,096	73.8%
Democratic	John G. Simmons	44,036	23.0%
Libertarian	Jona Joy Bergland	3,114	1.6%
Peace and Freedom	Joel Lorimer	2,930	1.5%
Total votes		191,176	100.0%
Turnout			
Republican hold			

=== 1988 ===
1988 United States House of Representatives elections in California
Party	Candidate	Votes	%
Republican	Carlos Moorhead (incumbent)	164,699	69.5%
Democratic	John G. Simmons	61,555	26.0%
Peace and Freedom	Shirley Rachel Isaacson	6,298	2.7%
Libertarian	Ted Brown	4,259	1.8%
Total votes		235,811	100.0%
Turnout			
Republican hold			

=== 1990 ===
1990 United States House of Representatives elections in California
Party	Candidate	Votes	%
Republican	Carlos Moorhead (incumbent)	108,634	60.0%
Democratic	David Bayer	61,630	34.1%
Libertarian	William H. Wilson	6,702	3.7%
Peace and Freedom	Jan B. Tucker	3,963	2.2%
Total votes		180,929	100.0%
Turnout			
Republican hold			

=== 1992 ===
1992 United States House of Representatives elections in California
Party	Candidate	Votes	%
Republican	Michael Huffington	131,242	52.5%
Democratic	Gloria Ochoa	87,328	34.9%
Green	Mindy Lorenz	23,699	9.5%
Libertarian	William Howard Dilbeck	7,553	3.0%
No party	Bialosky (write-in)	104	0.1%
Total votes		249,926	100.0%
Turnout			
Republican hold			

=== 1994 ===
1994 United States House of Representatives elections in California
Party	Candidate	Votes	%
Republican	Andrea Seastrand	102,987	49.27%
Democratic	Walter Capps	101,424	48.53%
Libertarian	David L. Bersohn	4,597	2.20%
Total votes		209,008	100.0%
Turnout			
Republican hold			

=== 1996 ===
1996 United States House of Representatives elections in California
Party	Candidate	Votes	%
Democratic	Walter Capps	118,299	48.5%
Republican	Andrea Seastrand (incumbent)	107,987	44.3%
Independent	Steven Wheeler	9,845	4.0%
Reform	Richard Porter	3,975	1.6%
Libertarian	David Bersohn	2,233	0.9%
Natural Law	Dawn Tomastik	1,847	0.7%
Total votes		244,186	100.0%
Turnout			
Democratic gain from Republican			

=== 1998 (special) ===
List of special elections to the United States House of Representatives in California
Party	Candidate	Votes	%
Democratic	Lois Capps	93,392	53.46%
Republican	Tom Bordonaro	78,224	44.78%
Libertarian	Robert Bakhaus	3,079	1.76%
Total votes		174,695	100.00%
Turnout			
Democratic hold			

=== 1998 ===
1998 United States House of Representatives elections in California
Party	Candidate	Votes	%
Democratic	Lois Capps (incumbent)	111,388	55.09%
Republican	Tom J. Bordonaro Jr.	86,921	42.99%
Libertarian	Robert Bakhaus	2,618	1.29%
Reform	Richard D. "Dick" Porter	1,263	0.62%
Total votes		202,190	100.0%
Turnout			
Democratic hold			

=== 2000 ===
2000 United States House of Representatives elections in California
Party	Candidate	Votes	%
Democratic	Lois Capps (incumbent)	135,538	53.2%
Republican	Mike Stoker	113,094	44.4%
Reform	Richard D. "Dick" Porter	2,490	0.9%
Libertarian	Joe Furcinite	2,060	0.8%
Natural Law	J. Carlos Aguirre	1,888	0.7%
Total votes		255,070	100.0%
Turnout			
Democratic hold			

=== 2002 ===
2002 United States House of Representatives elections in California
Party	Candidate	Votes	%
Republican	Bill Thomas	120,473	73.4%
Democratic	Jaime A. Corvera	38,988	23.7%
Libertarian	Frank Coates	4,824	2.9%
Total votes		164,285	100.0%
Turnout			
Republican gain from Democratic			

=== 2004 ===
2004 United States House of Representatives elections in California
Party	Candidate	Votes	%
Republican	Bill Thomas (incumbent)	209,384	100.0%
Turnout			
Republican hold			

=== 2006 ===
2006 United States House of Representatives elections in California
Party	Candidate	Votes	%
Republican	Kevin McCarthy	133,278	70.8%
Democratic	Sharon M. Beery	55,226	29.2%
Total votes		188,504	100.0%
Turnout			
Republican hold			

=== 2008 ===
2008 United States House of Representatives elections in California
Party	Candidate	Votes	%
Republican	Kevin McCarthy (incumbent)	224,549	100.0%
Total votes		224,549	100.0%
Turnout			
Republican hold			

=== 2010 ===
2010 United States House of Representatives elections in California
Party	Candidate	Votes	%
Republican	Kevin McCarthy (incumbent)	173,490	98.8%
Independent	John Uebersax (write-in)	2,173	1.2%
Total votes		175,663	100.0%
Turnout			
Republican hold			

=== 2012 ===
2012 United States House of Representatives elections in California
Party	Candidate	Votes	%
Republican	Devin Nunes (incumbent)	132,386	61.9%
Democratic	Otto Lee	81,555	38.1%
Total votes		213,941	100.0%
Republican hold			

=== 2014 ===
2014 United States House of Representatives elections in California
Party	Candidate	Votes	%
Republican	Devin Nunes (incumbent)	96,053	72.0%
Democratic	Suzanna "Sam" Aguilera-Marrero	37,289	28.0%
Total votes		133,342	100.0%
Republican hold			

=== 2016 ===
2016 United States House of Representatives elections in California
Party	Candidate	Votes	%
Republican	Devin Nunes (incumbent)	158,755	67.6%
Democratic	Louie J. Campos	76,211	32.4%
Total votes		234,966	100.0%
Republican hold			

=== 2018 ===
2018 United States House of Representatives elections in California
Party	Candidate	Votes	%
Republican	Devin Nunes (incumbent)	117,243	52.7%
Democratic	Andrew Janz	105,136	47.3%
Total votes		222,379	100.0%
Republican hold			

=== 2020 ===
2020 United States House of Representatives elections in California
Party	Candidate	Votes	%
Republican	Devin Nunes (incumbent)	151,864	54.2%
Democratic	Phil Arballo	128,564	45.8%
Total votes		280,428	100.0%
Republican hold			

=== 2022 (special) ===
2022 California's 22nd congressional district special election
Party	Candidate	Votes	%
Republican	Connie Conway	69,954	62.1%
Democratic	Lourin Hubbard	42,688	37.9%
Total votes		112,642	100.0%
Republican hold			

=== 2022 ===
2022 United States House of Representatives elections in California
Party	Candidate	Votes	%
Republican	David Valadao (incumbent)	52,994	51.5%
Democratic	Rudy Salas	49,862	48.5%
Total votes		102,856	100.0%
Republican hold			

=== 2024 ===
2024 United States House of Representatives elections in California
Party	Candidate	Votes	%
Republican	David Valadao (incumbent)	89,484	53.4
Democratic	Rudy Salas	78,023	46.6
Total votes		167,507	100.0%
Republican hold			

== Historical district boundaries ==
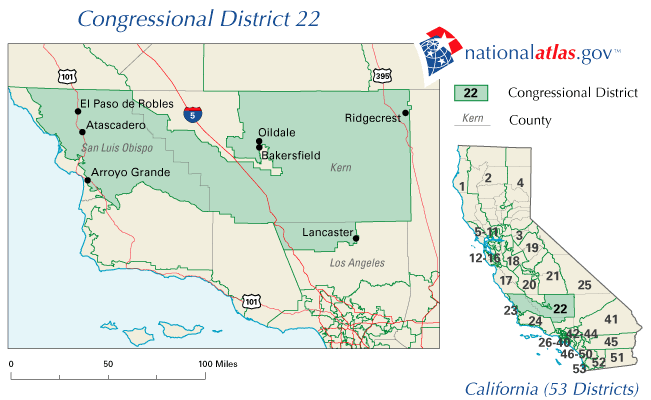
2003–2013

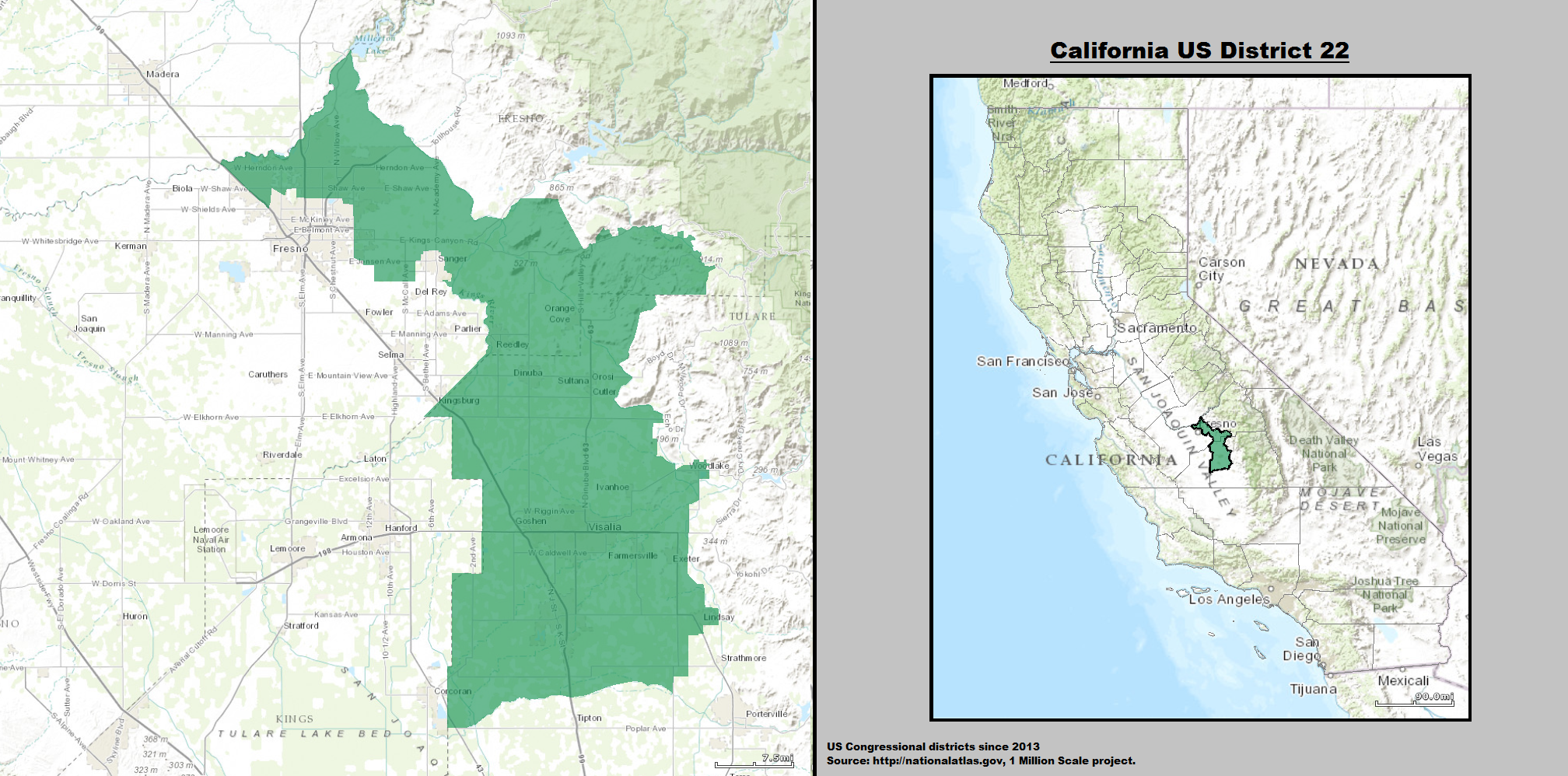
2013 – 2023

== See also ==
- List of United States congressional districts
- California's congressional districts
