= Seastrand =

Seastrand is a surname. Notable people with the surname include:

- Eric Seastrand (1938–1990), American politician who died in office
- Andrea Seastrand (born 1941), his widow, who succeeded him in office

== See also ==
- Eric Seastrand Highway, a section of California State Route 46
