= List of largest census-designated places in California =

Location of California in the United States

California is the most populous and third largest U.S. state by area, located on the West Coast of the United States. According to the 2020 United States census, California's population is 39,538,223 and has 155,858.33 square miles (403,671.2 km^{2}) of land.

California is divided into 58 counties and contains 1,129 census-designated places (CDPs) as of 2020 (1,136 as of 2023). San Francisco is a consolidated city-county, which means that San Francisco County does not contain any CDPs.

The census-designated places in this list have a population of 10,000 or higher.

== Census-designated places ==
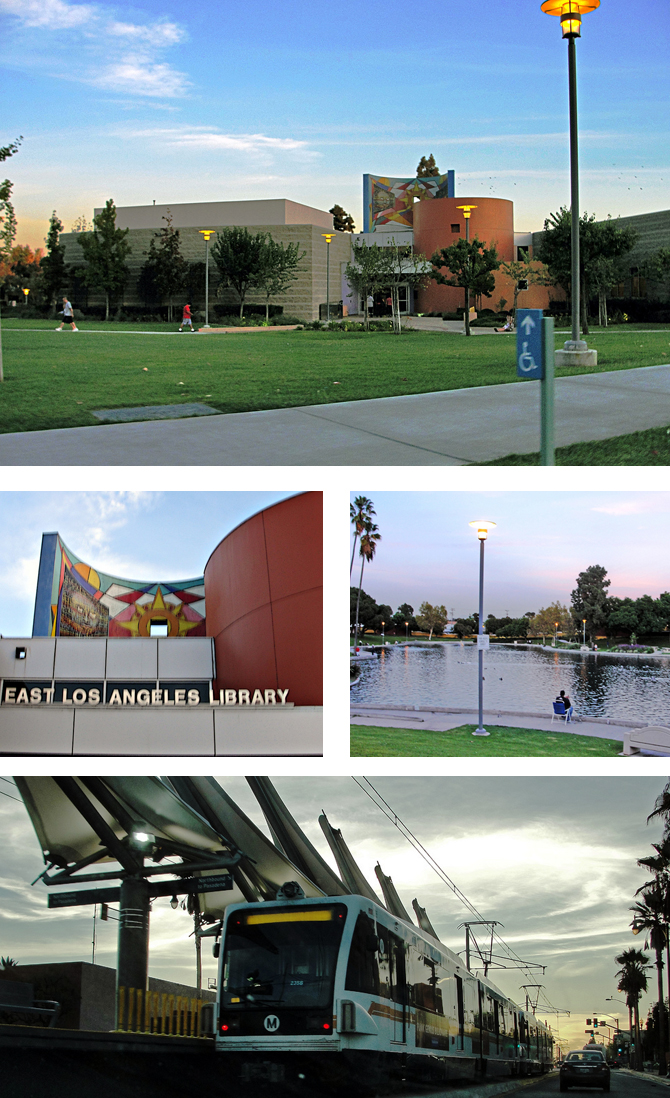
East Los Angeles

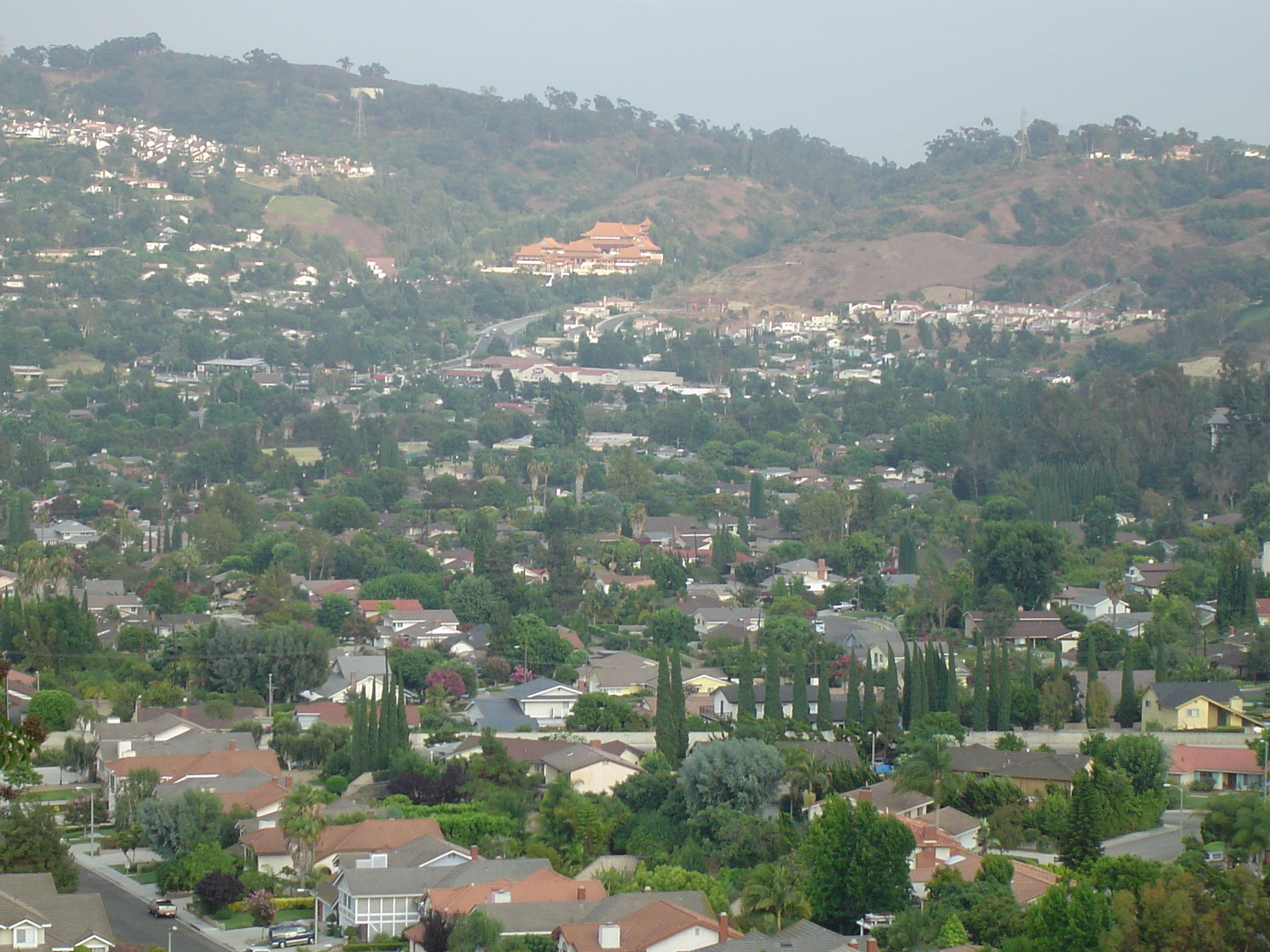
Hacienda Heights

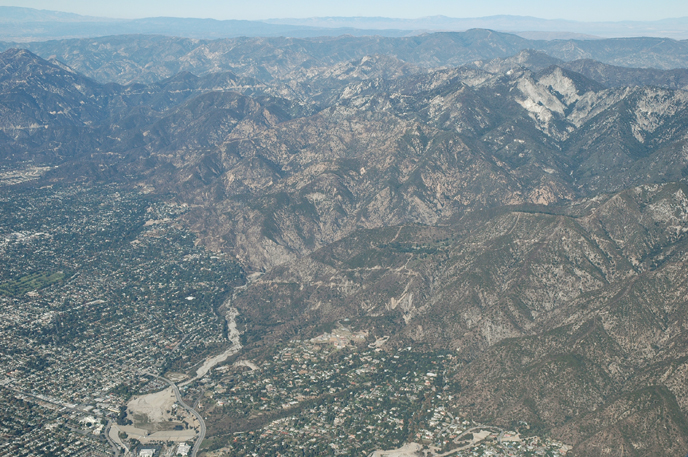
Eaton Canyon with an aerial view of Altadena

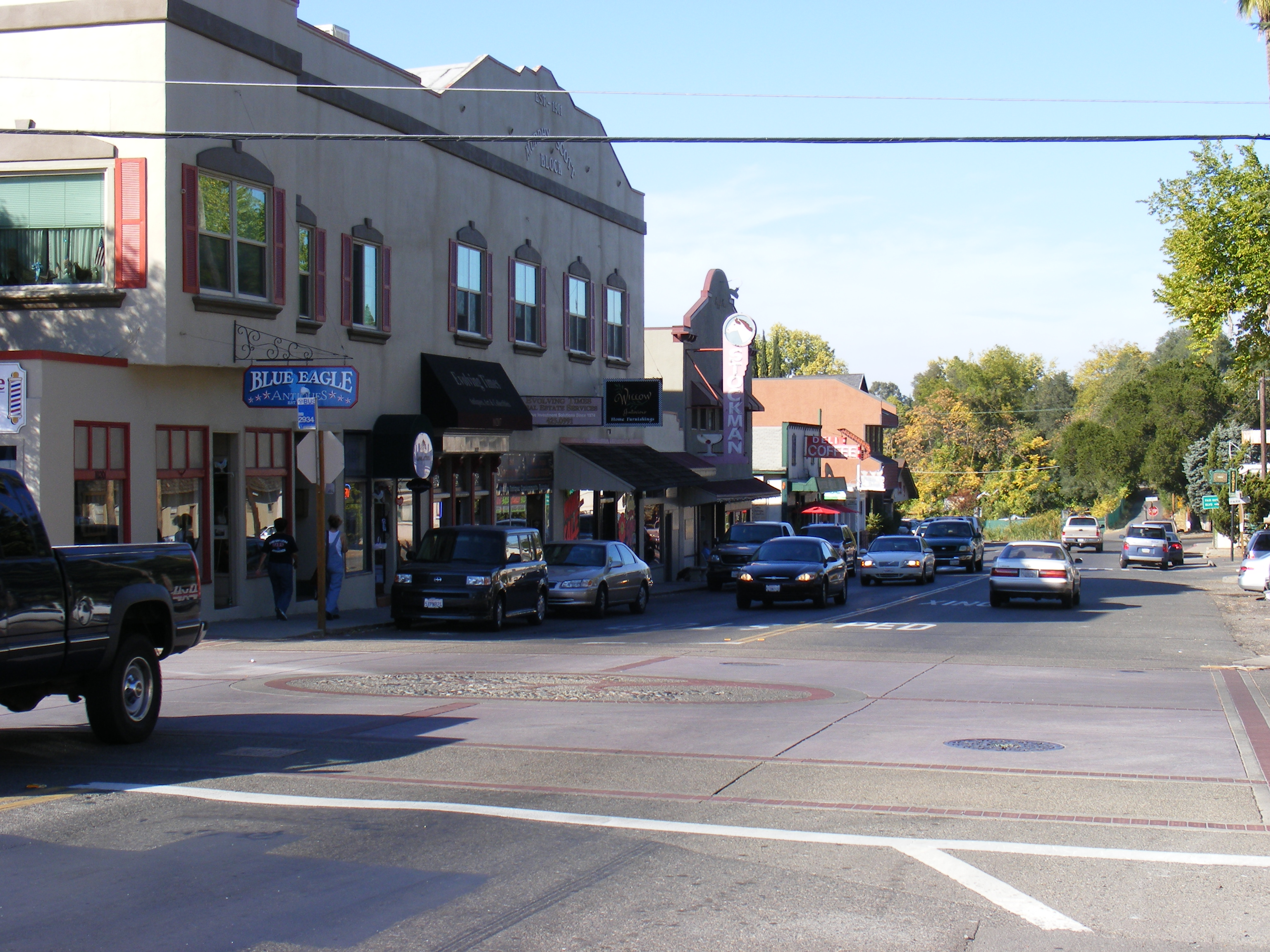
Fair Oaks Blvd in Fair Oaks

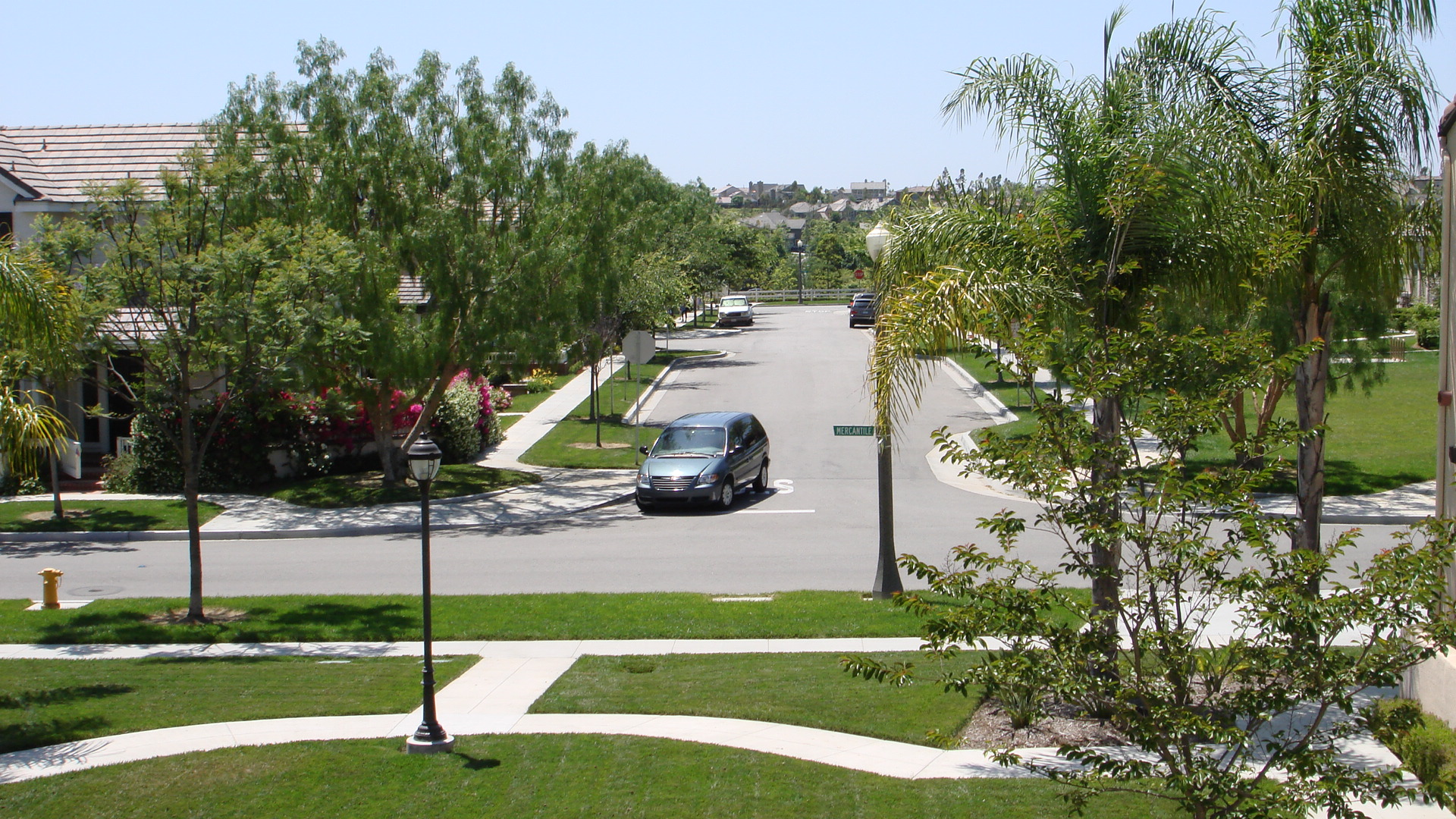
Ladera Ranch

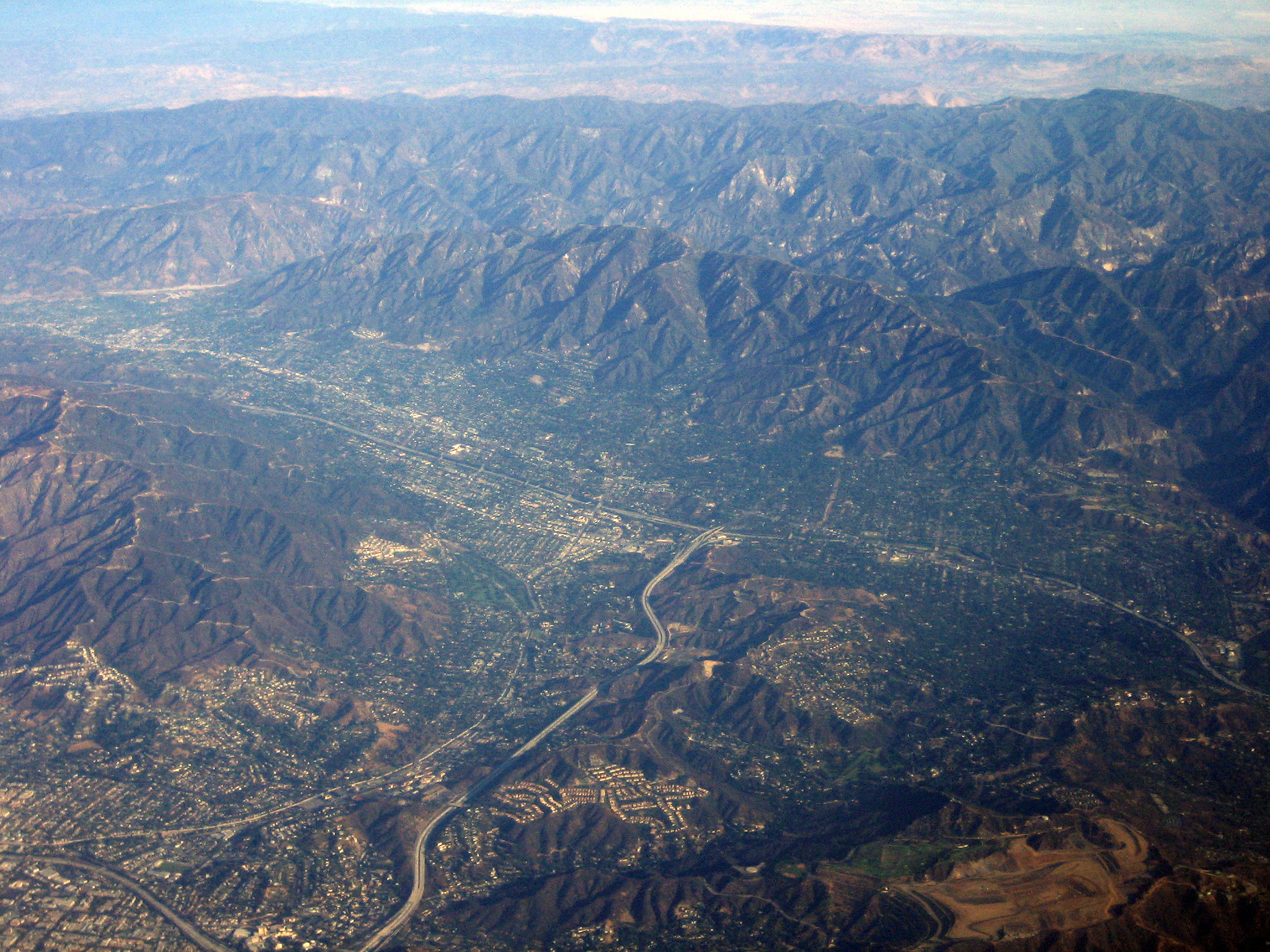
Aerial view of La Crescenta-Montrose

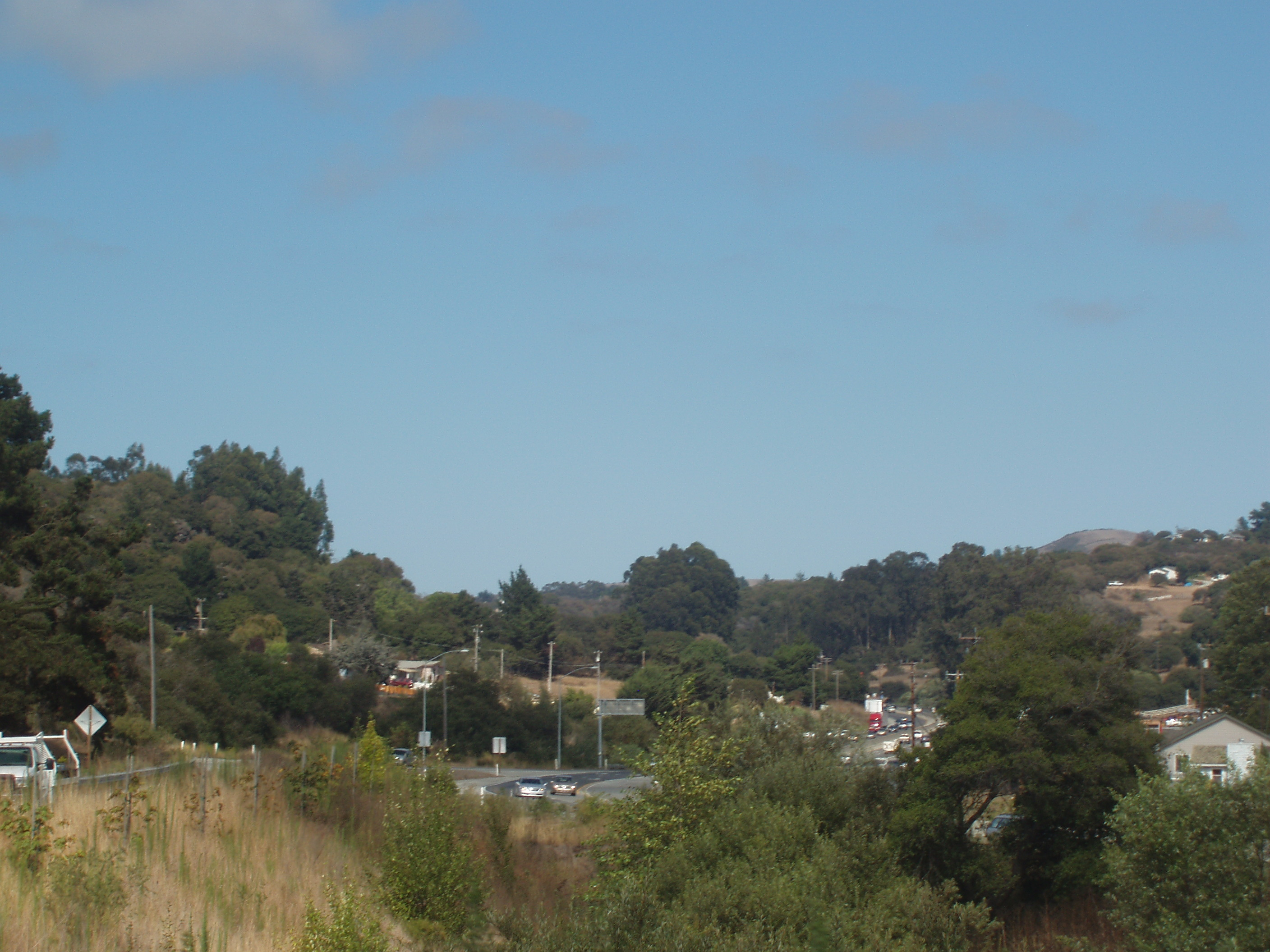
U.S. Route 101 in Prunedale

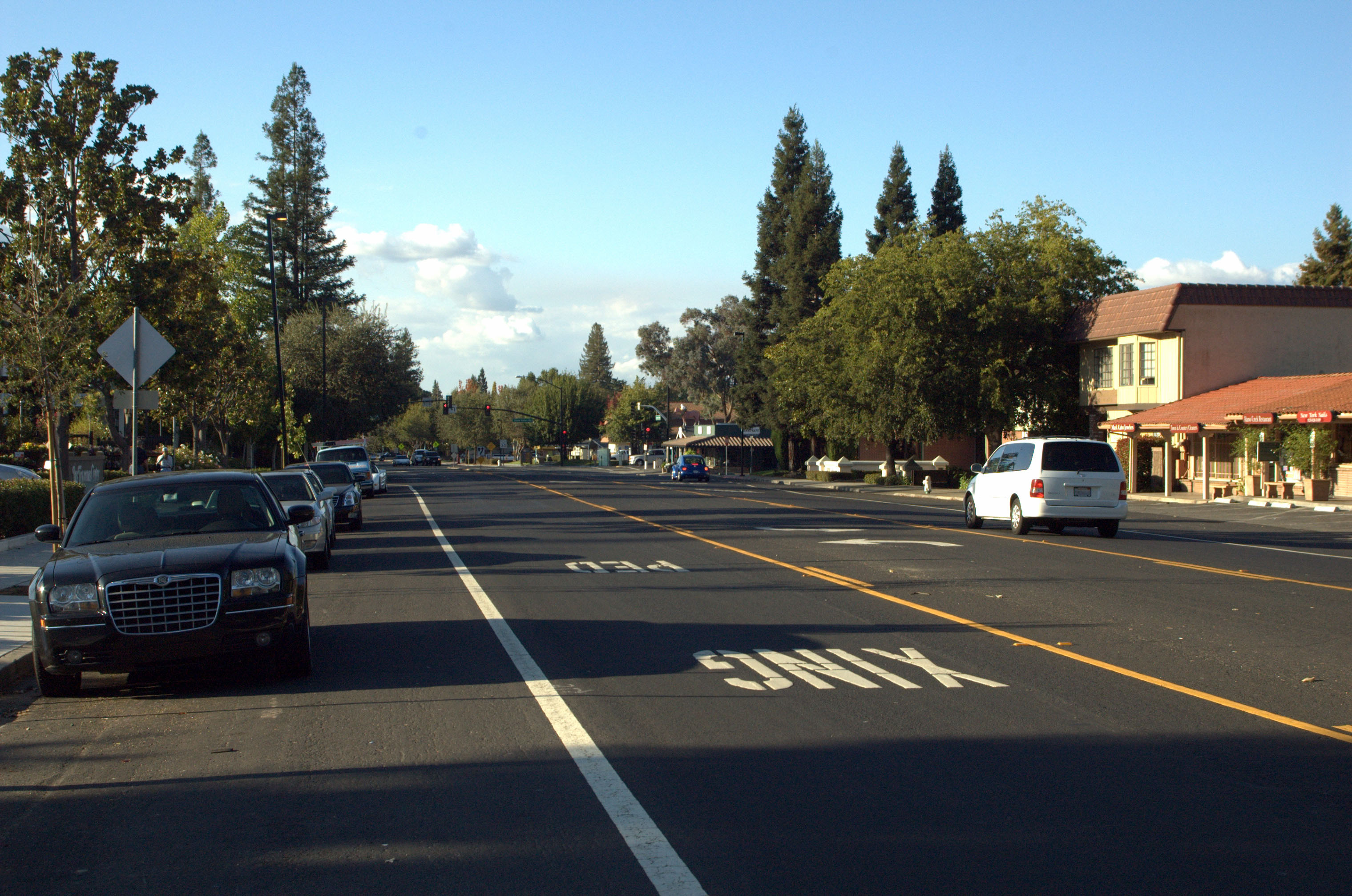
Downtown Alamo

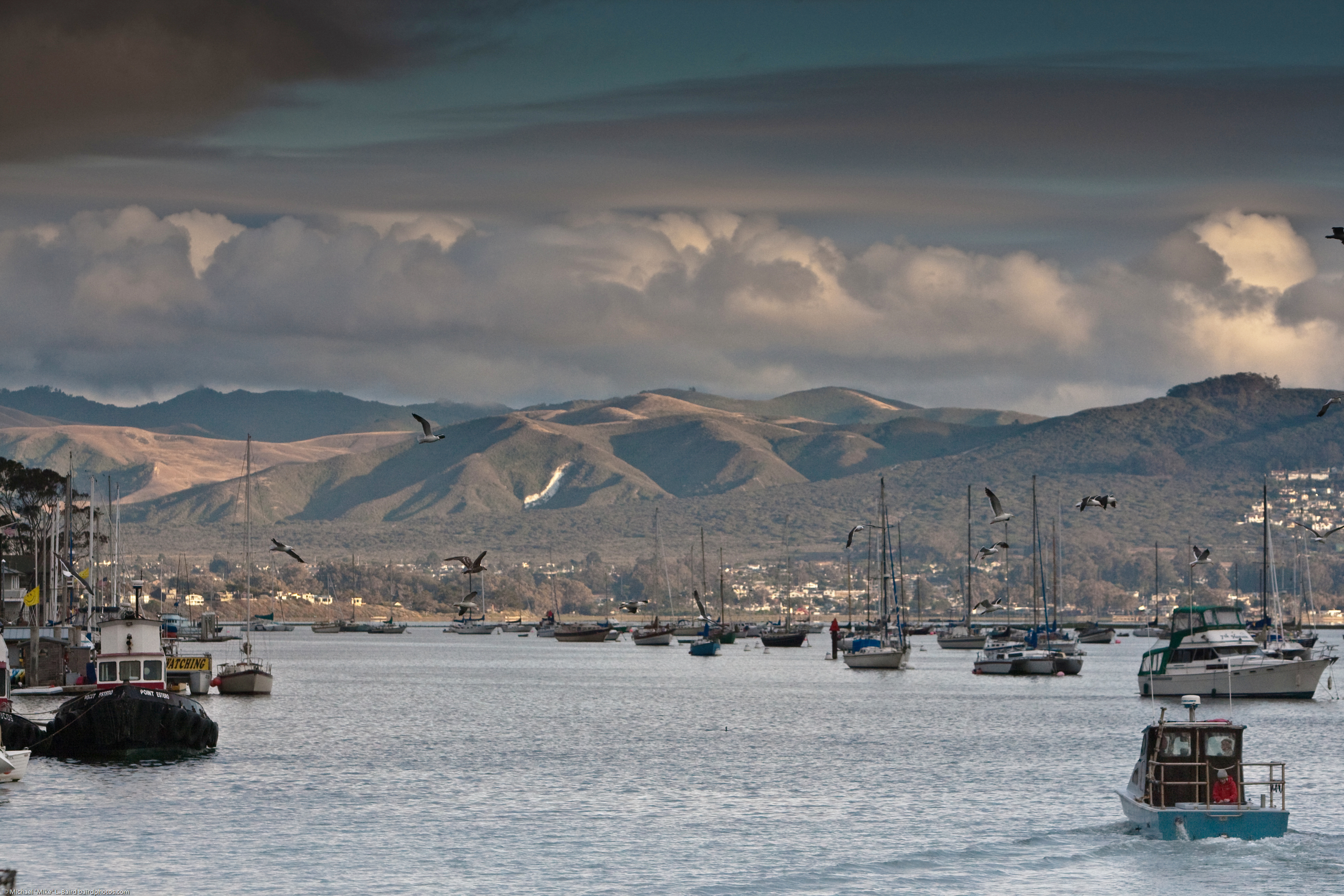
Irish Hills with a view of Los Osos

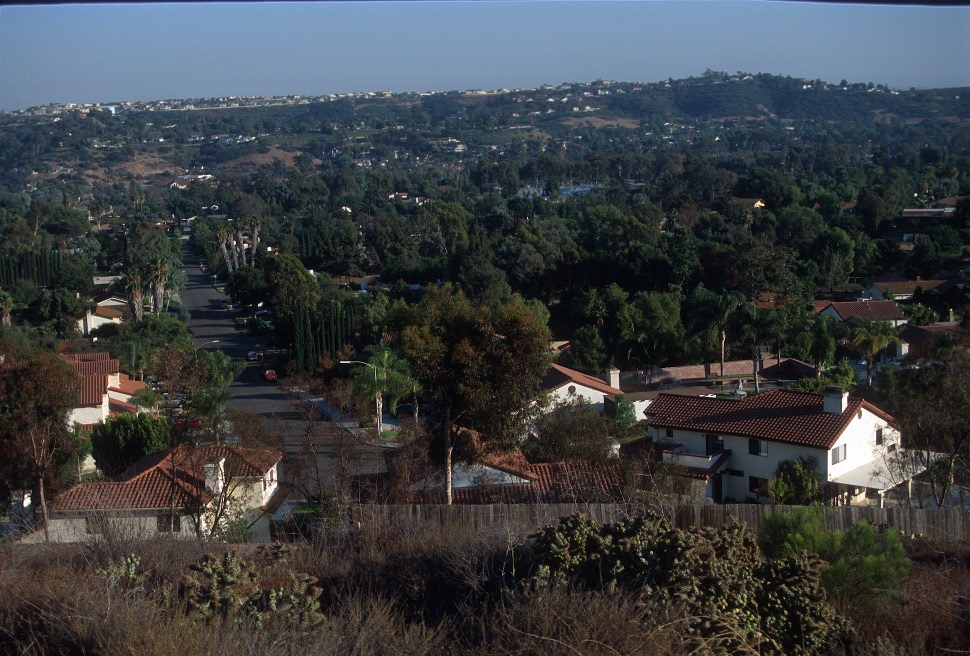
Bonita

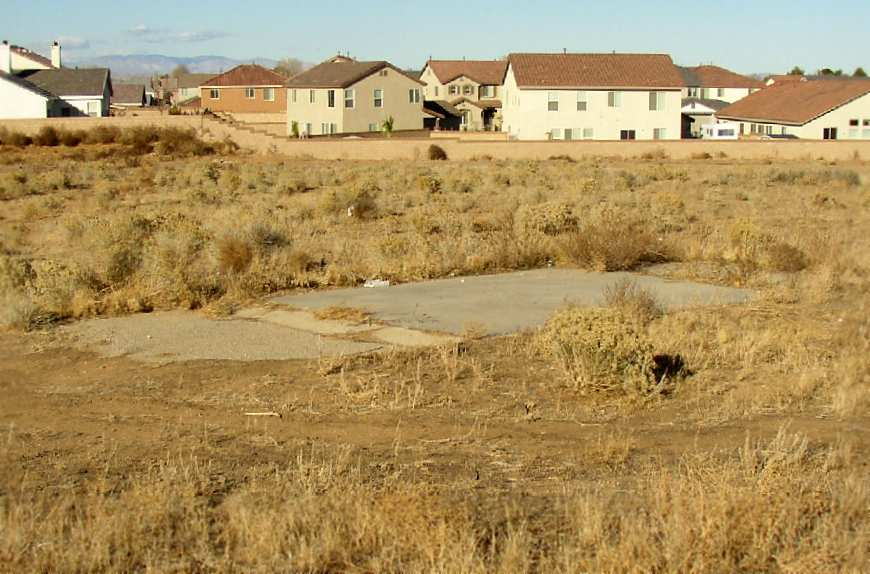
Quartz Hill

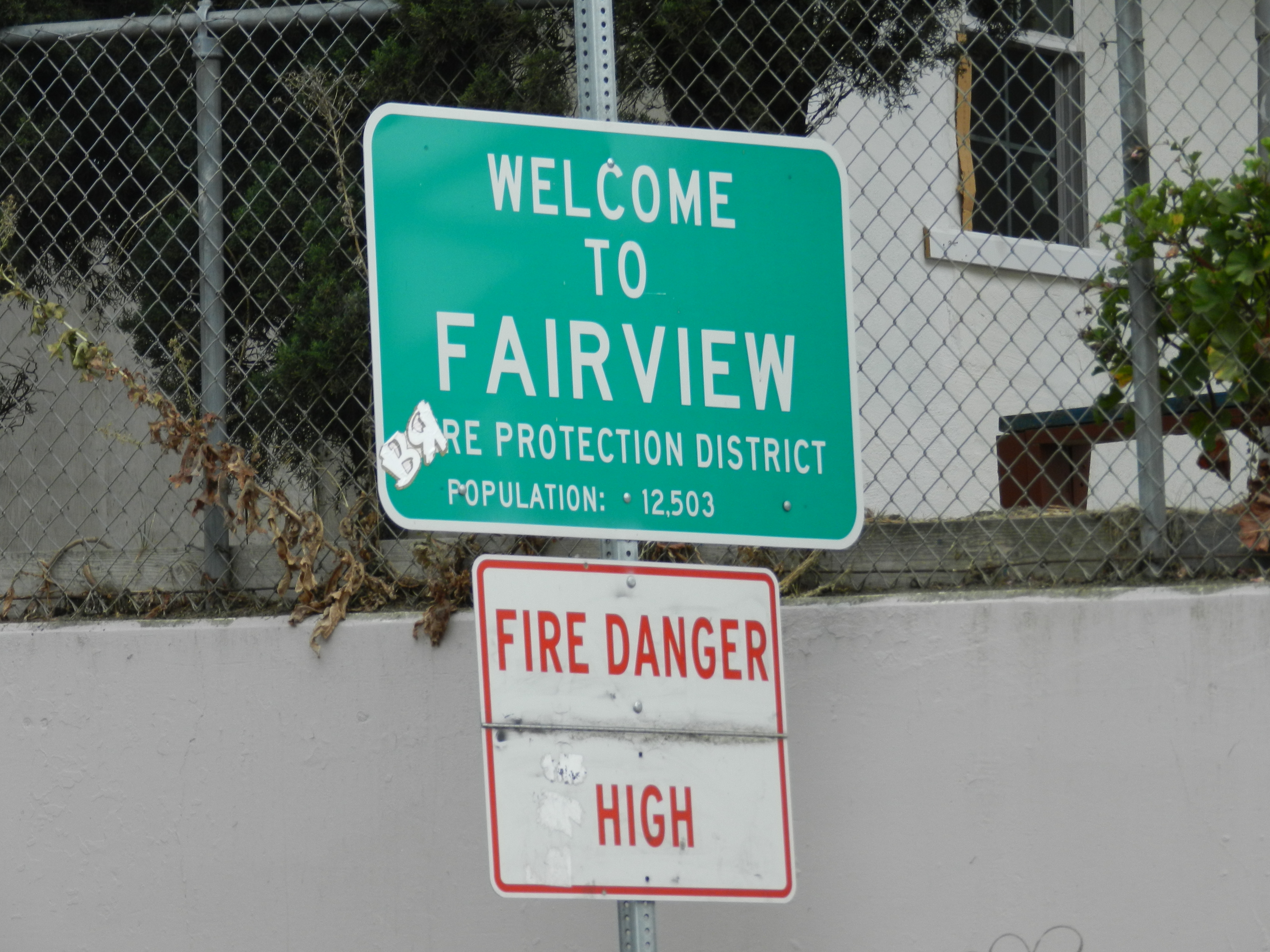
Fairview

Name	County	Population (2020)	Land area	
Name	County	Population (2020)	sq mi	km^{2}
East Los Angeles	Los Angeles	118,786	7.45	19.3
Arden-Arcade	Sacramento	94,659	15.90	41.2
Carmichael	Sacramento	79,793	15.33	39.7
Castro Valley	Alameda	66,441	16.85	43.6
Florence-Graham	Los Angeles	61,983	3.51	9.1
South Whittier	Los Angeles	56,415	5.34	13.8
Hacienda Heights	Los Angeles	54,191	11.15	28.9
Florin	Sacramento	52,388	8.71	22.6
El Dorado Hills	El Dorado	50,147	48.46	125.5
North Highlands	Sacramento	49,327	8.81	22.8
Rowland Heights	Los Angeles	48,321	13.08	33.9
Antelope	Sacramento	45,770	6.84	17.7
Vineyard	Sacramento	43,935	18.75	48.6
Altadena	Los Angeles	42,846	8.47	21.9
Oildale	Kern	36,135	7.91	20.5
Foothill Farms	Sacramento	35,834	4.20	10.9
Orangevale	Sacramento	35,569	11.45	29.7
French Valley	Riverside	35,280	10.87	28.2
La Presa	San Diego	35,033	5.50	14.2
Westmont	Los Angeles	33,913	1.85	4.8
Fair Oaks	Sacramento	32,514	10.88	28.2
Fallbrook	San Diego	32,267	17.54	45.4
Orcutt	Santa Barbara	32,034	10.82	28.0
Spring Valley	San Diego	30,998	7.34	19.0
San Lorenzo	Alameda	29,581	3.05	7.9
Eastern Goleta Valley	Santa Barbara	28,656	16.60	43.0
East Niles	Kern	28,390	5.46	14.1
Temescal Valley	Riverside	26,232	19.34	50.1
Ladera Ranch	Orange	26,170	4.95	12.8
North Tustin	Orange	25,718	6.58	17.0
West Whittier-Los Nietos	Los Angeles	25,325	2.52	6.5
Willowbrook	Los Angeles	24,395	1.68	4.4
West Rancho Dominguez	Los Angeles	24,347	3.97	10.3
Bloomington	San Bernardino	24,339	6.07	15.7
Bay Point	Contra Costa	23,896	6.43	16.7
Ashland	Alameda	23,823	1.84	4.8
Rosemont	Sacramento	23,510	4.39	11.4
West Puente Valley	Los Angeles	22,959	1.87	4.8
West Carson	Los Angeles	22,870	2.27	5.9
East San Gabriel	Los Angeles	22,769	2.18	5.6
Valinda	Los Angeles	22,437	2.01	5.2
Winter Gardens	San Diego	22,380	4.42	11.4
Rancho San Diego	San Diego	21,858	8.70	22.5
Linda	Yuba	21,654	8.59	22.2
Ramona	San Diego	21,468	38.44	99.6
Granite Bay	Placer	21,247	21.55	55.8
Lakeside	San Diego	21,152	6.93	17.9
Stanford	Santa Clara	21,150	2.75	7.1
Rosamond	Kern	20,961	52.12	135.0
Lennox	Los Angeles	20,323	1.09	2.8
Stevenson Ranch	Los Angeles	20,178	6.41	16.6
La Crescenta Montrose	Los Angeles	19,997	3.43	8.9
South San Jose Hills	Los Angeles	19,855	1.50	3.9
Mead Valley	Riverside	19,819	19.08	49.4
Casa de Oro-Mount Helix	San Diego	19,576	6.85	17.7
East Hemet	Riverside	19,432	5.20	13.5
Castaic	Los Angeles	18,937	7.26	18.8
Prunedale	Monterey	18,885	46.06	119.3
Cameron Park	El Dorado	18,881	11.23	29.1
Rosedale	Kern	18,639	29.27	75.8
Nipomo	San Luis Obispo	18,176	15.08	39.1
Live Oak	Santa Cruz	17,038	3.24	8.4
Bostonia	San Diego	16,882	1.93	5.0
Olivehurst	Yuba	16,595	8.41	21.8
McKinleyville	Humboldt	16,262	20.88	54.1
Valle Vista	Riverside	16,194	6.86	17.8
Parkway	Sacramento	15,962	2.41	6.2
Rio Linda	Sacramento	15,944	9.93	25.7
Cherryland	Alameda	15,808	1.19	3.1
Vincent	Los Angeles	15,714	1.47	3.8
El Sobrante	Contra Costa	15,524	3.10	8.0
Isla Vista	Santa Barbara	15,500	0.55	1.4
Woodcrest	Riverside	15,378	11.38	29.5
Discovery Bay	Contra Costa	15,358	5.59	14.5
Alamo	Contra Costa	15,314	9.82	25.4
Walnut Park	Los Angeles	15,214	0.75	1.9
East Rancho Dominguez	Los Angeles	15,114	0.82	2.1
Coto de Caza	Orange	14,710	7.80	20.2
Alpine	San Diego	14,696	26.79	69.4
Lemon Hill	Sacramento	14,496	1.64	4.2
Los Osos	San Luis Obispo	14,465	12.76	33.0
Lamont	Kern	14,049	4.78	12.4
El Sobrante	Riverside	14,039	7.23	18.7
North Fair Oaks	San Mateo	14,027	1.20	3.1
Oak Park	Ventura	13,898	5.30	13.7
Salida	Stanislaus	13,886	2.22	5.7
Phelan	San Bernardino	13,859	60.09	155.6
North Auburn	Placer	13,452	7.79	20.2
Avocado Heights	Los Angeles	13,317	2.25	5.8
Lake Los Angeles	Los Angeles	13,187	9.74	25.2
Bonita	San Diego	12,917	5.02	13.0
Big Bear City	San Bernardino	12,738	32.02	82.9
Camp Pendleton South	San Diego	12,468	6.95	18.0
Lake Arrowhead	San Bernardino	12,401	17.68	45.8
Lakeland Village	Riverside	12,364	8.78	22.7
Sun Village	Los Angeles	12,345	10.80	28.0
Alum Rock	Santa Clara	12,042	0.87	2.3
Winton	Merced	11,709	3.04	7.9
Crestline	San Bernardino	11,650	13.90	36.0
Tamalpais-Homestead Valley	Marin	11,492	4.69	12.1
Quartz Hill	Los Angeles	11,447	3.76	9.7
View Park-Windsor Hills	Los Angeles	11,419	1.84	4.8
Garden Acres	San Joaquin	11,398	2.58	6.7
Marina del Rey	Los Angeles	11,373	0.86	2.2
Diamond Springs	El Dorado	11,345	16.64	43.1
Fairview	Alameda	11,341	2.97	7.7
La Riviera	Sacramento	11,252	1.90	4.9
Home Gardens	Riverside	11,203	1.51	3.9
Country Club	San Joaquin	10,777	1.92	5.0
Muscoy	San Bernardino	10,719	3.04	7.9
Delhi	Merced	10,656	3.51	9.1
Rossmoor	Orange	10,625	1.56	4.0
Hillcrest	Kern	10,528	1.38	3.6
San Diego Country Estates	San Diego	10,395	16.78	43.5
East Whittier	Los Angeles	10,394	1.09	2.8
Rancho Mission Viejo	Orange	10,378	37.81	97.9
Del Aire	Los Angeles	10,338	1.01	2.6
Citrus	Los Angeles	10,243	0.88	2.3

== See also ==
- List of counties in California
- List of places in California
