= La Cresta, California =

La Cresta, California may refer to:

- La Cresta, Kern County, California
- La Cresta, San Diego County, California

== See also ==
- La Cresta Village, California
