= Hillcrest, California =

Hillcrest, California may refer to:

- Hillcrest, Kern County, California
- Hillcrest, San Diego, California
