= Fairfax, Kern County, California =

Census-designated place near Bakersfield, US

Fairfax, California
- Unincorporated community Census-designated place
- Location in California Fairfax, California (the United States)
- Coordinates: 35°20′48.79″N 118°56′1.70″W
- Country: United States
- State: California
- County: Kern

Area
  - Total: 0.952 sq mi (2.47 km^{2})
  - Land: 0.952 sq mi (2.47 km^{2})
  - Water: 0 sq mi (0 km^{2})
- Elevation: 413 ft (126 m)

Population (2020)
  - Total: 1,879
  - Density: 1,970/sq mi (762/km^{2})
- Time zone: UTC-8 (Pacific)
  - Summer (DST): UTC-7 (PDT)
- GNIS feature ID: 2804405

Fairfax is an unincorporated community and census-designated place (CDP) in Kern County, California, United States. The CDP is within the Bakersfield's census county division, and borders the city of Bakersfield to the west and East Niles to the north.

== Details ==
As listed in the Geographic Names Information System, its elevation is 413 feet.

Its population was 1,879 at the 2020 census, the first census it was included in.

== Demographics ==
Historical population
Census	Pop.	Note	%±
2020	1,879		—
U.S. Decennial Census; 1860–1870 1880-1890; 1900 1910 1920; 1930 1940 1950; 1960 1970 1980; 1990 2000 2010; 2020

Fairfax first appeared as a census designated place in the 2020 U.S. census.

=== 2020 Census ===
Fairfax CDP (Kern County), California – Racial and ethnic composition Note: the US Census treats Hispanic/Latino as an ethnic category. This table excludes Latinos from the racial categories and assigns them to a separate category. Hispanics/Latinos may be of any race.
Race / Ethnicity (NH = Non-Hispanic)	Pop 2020	% 2020
White alone (NH)	320	17.03%
Black or African American alone (NH)	25	1.33%
Native American or Alaska Native alone (NH)	7	0.37%
Asian alone (NH)	17	0.90%
Native Hawaiian or Pacific Islander alone (NH)	3	0.16%
Other race alone (NH)	6	0.32%
Mixed race or Multiracial (NH)	41	2.18%
Hispanic or Latino (any race)	1,460	77.70%
Total	1,879	100.00%
