= Nelson S. Dilworth =

American politician (1890–1965)

Nelson Smith Dilworth
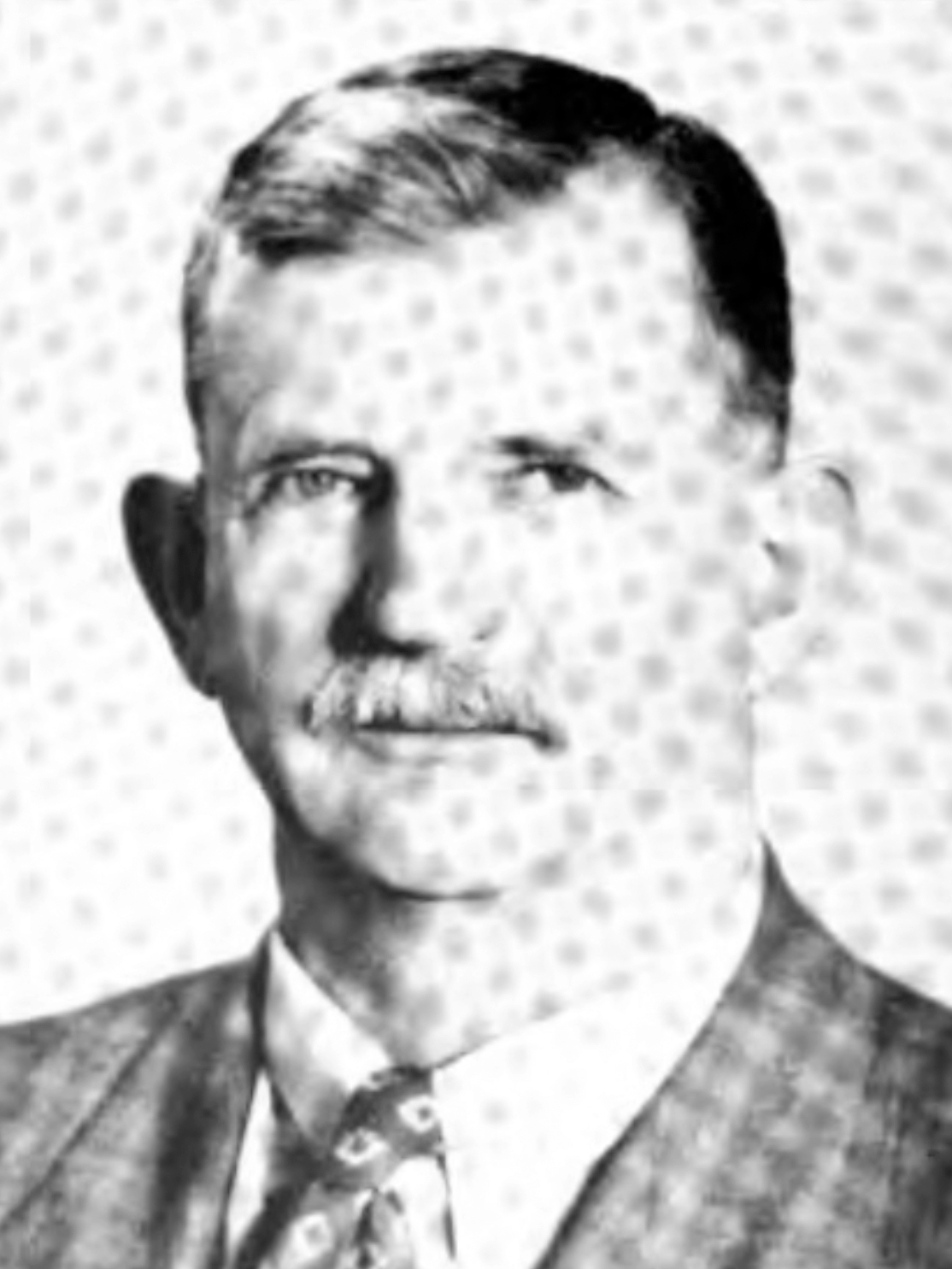

Member of the California State Senate from the 37th district
- In office January 8, 1945 – January 2, 1961
- Preceded by: John R. Phillips
- Succeeded by: Lee Backstrand

Member of the California State Assembly from the 76th district
- In office January 4, 1937 – January 8, 1945
- Preceded by: John R. Phillips
- Succeeded by: Philip L. Boyd

Personal details
- Born: Nelson Smith Dilworth; June 27, 1890 East Palestine, Ohio, U.S.
- Died: June 21, 1965 (aged 74) Hemet, California, U.S.
- Party: Republican
- Spouse: Lillian Olive Whiteman (m. 1924)
- Relations: Robert P. Dilworth (brother)
- Children: 3

Military service
- Allegiance: United States
- Branch/service: United States Army
- Battles/wars: World War I

Nelson S. Dilworth (June 27, 1890 – June 21, 1965) was an American farmer who served for 24 years in the California legislature. Dilworth was a strong proponent of restrictions on communists in schools and state government jobs.

== Early life ==
Dilworth was born in Ohio in 1890. His family moved to Los Angeles when he was seven, then moved to the Coachella Valley in 1903. During World War I. Dilworth served in the American Expeditionary Forces in France. He later became a farmer in Hemet, California. He served as a mail carrier, postmaster, and Assistant Clerk of the state Assembly.

== Political career ==
Dilworth was elected to the California State Assembly in 1936, where he served until his election to the state senate in 1944.

Dilworth was a member of the Senate Factfinding Subcommittee on Un-American Activities under state Senator Jack Tenney. A staunch anti-communist, Dilworth sponsored legislation to prevent Communists from employment in the state government. He also introduced legislation that removed the US Communist Party from the ballot in California. Dilworth authored the Fourth Report of the Senate Fact-Finding Committee on Un-American Activities, 1948: Communist Front Organizations.

Dilworth also served as chairman of the Senate Investigating Committee on Education. This committee produced several reports relating to alleged communists in education in California, including its Third Report in 1952, which identified that Kenneth MacGowan, employed by the University of California Berkeley, "has been affiliated with ... Communist front organizations" including the Motion Picture Artist's Committee and the Hollywood Democratic Party.

The 1953 Dilworth Act specified that "no person knowingly a member of the Communist Party shall be employed or retained in employment by a school district" and that all school district employees have a duty to answer, under oath, questions about their membership in the Communist Party. Refusing to answer such questions constituted grounds for dismissal. One teacher dismissed for refusing to answer questions about her husband's associations was Jean Benson Wilkinson, a teacher in the Los Angeles Unified School District. Her husband, Frank Wilkinson, was an officer of the Los Angeles City Housing Authority. Jean Wilkinson was dismissed as a teacher after refusing to answer questions before a California State Senate UnAmerican Activities Committee hearing which was investigating her husband.

Dilworth is quoted as saying,

"It is often true that many things which, in the end, bring benefits and satisfaction are very difficult to get started in the beginning. So it is going to be hard to save America from those who are pushing us and taxing us downhill into a form of state socialism. And there is no time to lose."

and

"Citizens must have labor preference over aliens."

== Personal life ==
Dilworth retired from the legislature in 1960 at age 70. He died in 1965.

The Nelson S Dilworth Elementary School in San Jose, California, is named after him, although he had no apparent connection to San Jose. The school opened in 1965, the year that Dilworth died.
