= List of places in California =

This list of current:

- cities
- towns, unincorporated communities
- counties, and other recognized places in the U.S. state of California.

Information on the number and names of counties in which the place lies, and its lower and upper ZIP Code bounds, if applicable are also included.

== See also ==
- List of cities in California
- List of counties in California
- List of census-designated places in California
- List of largest census-designated places in California
