= John R. Phillips (American politician) =

American politician

John Phillips
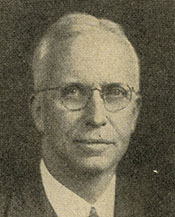

Member of the U.S. House of Representatives from California
- In office January 3, 1943 – January 3, 1957
- Preceded by: New seat
- Succeeded by: Dalip Singh Saund
- Constituency: 22nd district (1943–53); 29th district (1953–57)

Member of the California Senate from the 37th district
- In office January 4, 1937 – November 15, 1942
- Preceded by: Leonard Difani
- Succeeded by: Nelson S. Dilworth

Member of the California State Assembly from the 76th district
- In office January 2, 1933 – January 4, 1937
- Preceded by: Chester M. Kline
- Succeeded by: Nelson S. Dilworth

City council member of Banning, California
- In office 1930–1932

Personal details
- Born: September 11, 1887 Wilkes-Barre, Pennsylvania, U.S.
- Died: December 18, 1983 (aged 96) Palm Springs, California, U.S.
- Resting place: Desert Memorial Park
- Party: Republican
- Education: Haverford College

Military service
- Branch/service: United States Army
- Battles/wars: World War I

John Phillips (September 11, 1887 – December 18, 1983) was an American businessman and veteran of World War I who served seven terms as a member of the U.S. House of Representatives from California from 1943 to 1957.

== Early life and career ==
John Phillips was born in Wilkes-Barre, Pennsylvania. He moved to St. Davids, Pennsylvania, in 1891. He graduated from Haverford College in 1910.

=== World War I ===
He served in the United States Army during World War I, where he served in the Adjutant General's Office and in Ordinance from 1917 to 1919.

He moved to California in 1924 and worked as a business analyst and rancher.

== Political career ==
He was a member of the city council of Banning, California, 1930–1932. He served in the California Assembly from 1933 to 1937, and was a member of the California Senate from 1937 to 1942. He was a member of the United States delegation to the Eleventh World's Dairy Congress in Berlin in 1937.

=== Congress ===
Phillips was elected as a Republican to the Seventy-eighth and to the six succeeding Congresses. He was not a candidate for renomination in 1956.

He was a delegate to Republican National Conventions in 1944, 1948, 1952, 1956, and 1960.

== Private life ==
He was a member of the American Battle Monuments Commission from 1952 to 1961. He was engaged as a public relations counselor and was a resident of Hemet, California, until his death.

== Death and burial ==
He died in Palm Springs, California, on December 18, 1983, at the age of 96. He was interred in Desert Memorial Park, Cathedral City, California.

== Electoral history ==
1942 United States House of Representatives elections in California
Party	Candidate	Votes	%
Republican	John J. Phillips	42,765	57.6%
Democratic	N. E. West	31,440	42.4%
Total votes		74,205	100.0%
Turnout			
Republican win (new seat)			

1944 United States House of Representatives elections in California
Party	Candidate	Votes	%
Republican	John J. Phillips (incumbent)	88,537	100.0%
Turnout			
Republican hold			

1946 United States House of Representatives elections in California
Party	Candidate	Votes	%
Republican	John J. Phillips (incumbent)	59,935	62.1%
Democratic	Ray Adkinson	36,649	37.9%
Total votes		96,584	100.0%
Turnout			
Republican hold			

1948 United States House of Representatives elections in California
Party	Candidate	Votes	%
Republican	John J. Phillips (incumbent)	115,697	100.0%
Turnout			
Republican hold			

1950 United States House of Representatives elections in California
Party	Candidate	Votes	%
Republican	John J. Phillips (incumbent)	114,497	100.0%
Turnout			
Republican hold			

1952 United States House of Representatives elections in California
Party	Candidate	Votes	%
Republican	John J. Phillips (Incumbent)	73,144	100.0
Republican hold			

1954 United States House of Representatives elections in California
Party	Candidate	Votes	%
Republican	John J. Phillips (Incumbent)	42,420	58.0
Democratic	Bruce Shangle	30,781	42.0
Total votes		73,201	100.0
Republican hold			

U.S. House of Representatives
Preceded by District Created	Member of the U.S. House of Representatives from California's 22nd congressional district 1943–1953	Succeeded by Joseph F. Holt
Preceded by District Created	Member of the U.S. House of Representatives from California's 29th congressional district 1953–1957	Succeeded by Dalip Singh Saund
