= Walter Capps =

American politician

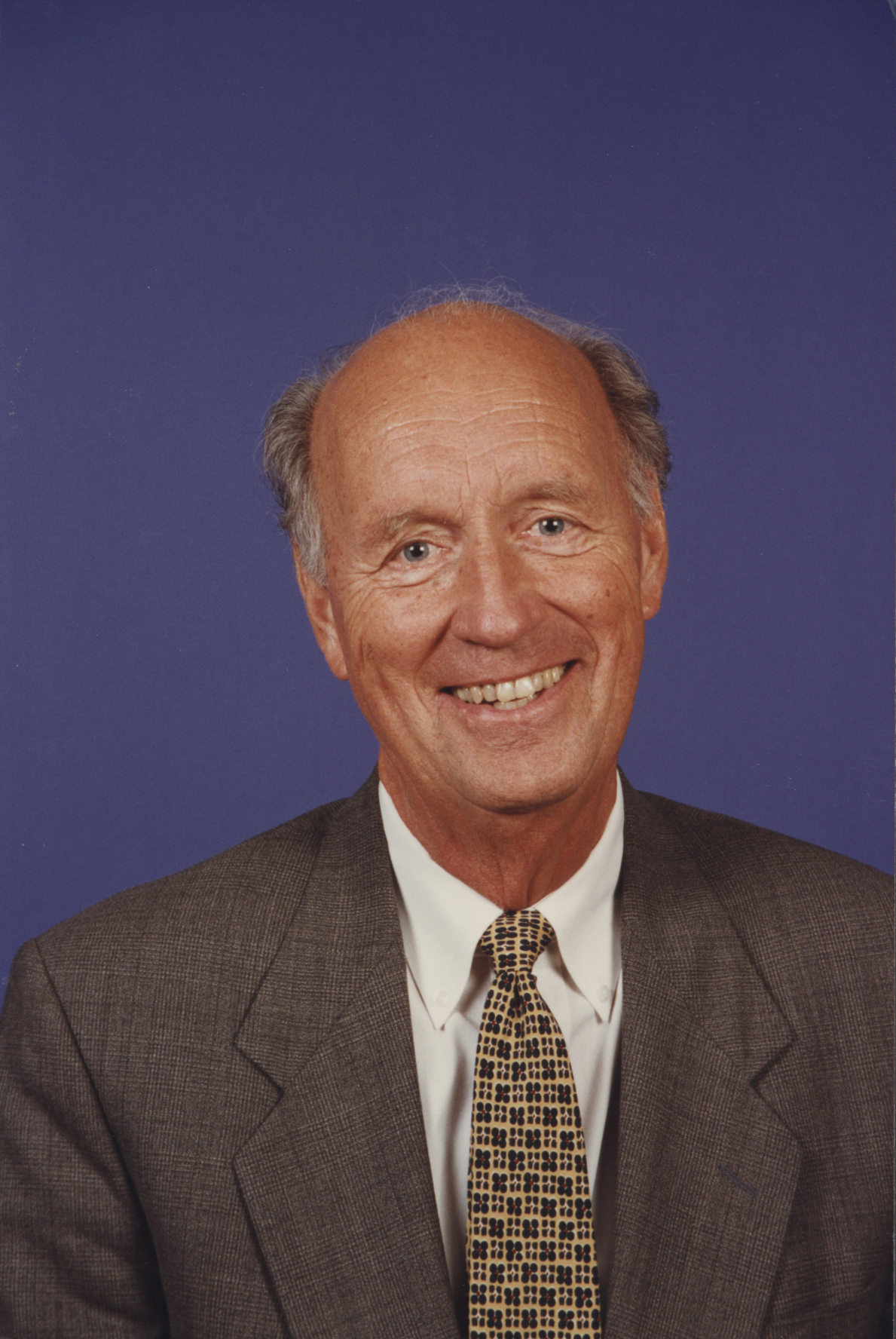

Member of the U.S. House of Representatives from California's 22nd district
- In office January 3, 1997 – October 28, 1997
- Preceded by: Andrea Seastrand
- Succeeded by: Lois Capps

Personal details
- Born: May 5, 1934 Omaha, Nebraska, U.S.
- Died: October 28, 1997 (aged 63) Reston, Virginia, U.S.
- Resting place: Santa Barbara Cemetery; Santa Barbara, California, U.S.
- Party: Democratic
- Spouse: Lois Grimsrud (m. 1960)
- Children: 3

Walter Holden Capps (May 5, 1934 – October 28, 1997) was an American academic and politician. He served as a Democratic member of the United States House of Representatives, representing California's 22nd congressional district from January 1997 until his death nine months later.

== Education ==
Capps received both a master's degree and PhD from Yale Divinity School. On May 30, 1997, Capps received an honorary doctorate from the Faculty of Theology at Uppsala University, Sweden.

== Academic career ==
Before entering politics, Capps taught for more than thirty years at the University of California, Santa Barbara. As a professor of religious studies he helped define the field, and cataloged the growth and changes in his 1995 book Religious Studies: The Making of a Discipline. An anti-war activist during the 1960s, he later initiated a nationally renowned course titled "Religion and the Impact of Vietnam" in 1979.

Capps also served on the advisory board of the Project on the Vietnam Generation.

== Political career ==
Capps lost an election to Andrea Seastrand for the 22nd district in California in 1994, which was a landslide year for the Republicans, but he ran again in the following election. While driving home from a campaign event during the summer of 1996, Capps' vehicle was struck by a drunk supporter. Capps was seriously injured and was unable to actively campaign until the final few weeks of the race. During his absence from the campaign, his opponent, graciously, didn't make his health an issue. Ultimately, despite his absence from the campaign trail, Capps won, even as Bob Dole edged Bill Clinton in the district.

=== Death ===
On October 28, 1997, Capps collapsed after suffering a heart attack at Dulles International Airport, and was pronounced dead at a hospital in Reston, Virginia. Jesse Jackson attended his funeral. Capps was succeeded by his widow, Lois Capps, who won in a special election in the spring of 1998. Subsequent legislation by Congresswoman Capps has mandated the presence of automated external defibrillators in public places.

== Electoral history ==
1994 United States House of Representatives elections in California
Party	Candidate	Votes	%
Republican	Andrea Seastrand	102,987	49.27%
Democratic	Walter Capps	101,424	48.53%
Libertarian	David L. Bersohn	4,597	2.20%
Total votes		209,008	100.0%
Turnout			
Republican hold			

1996 United States House of Representatives elections in California
Party	Candidate	Votes	%
Democratic	Walter Capps	118,299	48.5%
Republican	Andrea Seastrand (incumbent)	107,987	44.3%
Independent	Steven Wheeler	9,845	4.0%
Reform	Richard Porter	3,975	1.6%
Libertarian	David Bersohn	2,233	0.9%
Natural Law	Dawn Tomastik	1,847	0.7%
Total votes		244,186	100.0%
Turnout			
Democratic gain from Republican			

== See also ==
- List of members of the United States Congress who died in office (1950–1999)

U.S. House of Representatives
Preceded by Andrea Seastrand	Member of the U.S. House of Representatives from California's 22nd congressional district January 3, 1997 – October 28, 1997	Succeeded by Lois Capps
