= Joseph F. Holt =

American politician

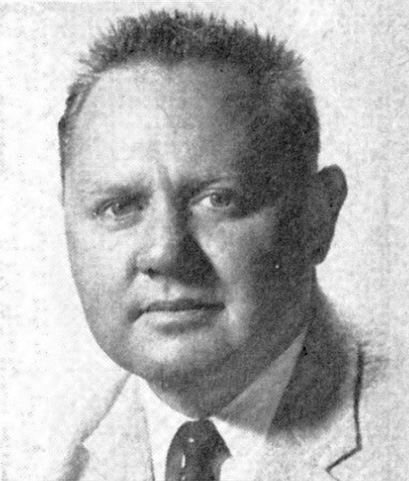
- From Pocket Congressional Directory of the Eighty-Sixth Congress, 1959

Member of the U.S. House of Representatives from California's 22nd district
- In office January 3, 1953 – January 3, 1961
- Preceded by: John J. Phillips
- Succeeded by: James C. Corman

Personal details
- Born: Joseph Franklin Holt, III; July 6, 1924 Springfield, Massachusetts, U.S.
- Died: July 14, 1997 (aged 73) Santa Maria, California, U.S.
- Party: Republican
- Education: University of Southern California (B.S.)
- Awards: Purple Heart

Military service
- Allegiance: United States
- Branch/service: United States Marine Corps
- Years of service: 1943-1945, 1951
- Rank: Second lieutenant
- Battles/wars: World War II; Korean War

Joseph Franklin Holt III (July 6, 1924 – July 14, 1997) was an American World War II veteran, businessman and politician who served four terms as a U.S. representative from California from 1953 to 1961.

== Life and career ==
Born in Springfield, Massachusetts, Holt moved to Los Angeles, California, with his parents, at the age of one. He grew up there, and attended the public schools.

=== World War II ===
Holt later enlisted as a private in the United States Marine Corps and was called to active duty in July 1943 during World War II. He was discharged as a second lieutenant in October 1945.

=== Education and early career ===
He returned home and attended the University of Southern California where he received a Bachelor of Science degree in 1947. He later went into the insurance business and then entered the field of public relations.

Eventually he became the state president of the Young Republicans of California and was Richard Nixon's field director during Nixon's 1950 Senate race against Helen Gahagan Douglas. In January 1951, he was recalled to active duty with the Marine Corps and volunteered for duty in the Korean War. He was wounded in action and awarded the Purple Heart.

=== Congress ===
Holt was elected as a Republican to the 83rd United States Congress in 1952. He stayed for three terms until he declined to run for re-election in 1960. In the 1952 Republican primary for the newly drawn 22nd congressional district in southern California, he was aided by the strong endorsement of Richard Nixon. His opponent, the state senator Jack Tenney, felt that Nixon, a popular U.S. senator, should have remained neutral in the race, but Nixon countered by saying that Holt represented the sort of young veteran that Congress needed.

During a visit to the Soviet Union in 1955, Holt was held at gun point by a Soviet Army officer, who demanded that he cease taking photographs of a church near Moscow.

Holt voted in favor of the Civil Rights Act of 1957 and the Civil Rights Act of 1960.

=== Comeback attempt ===
Holt attempted, unsuccessfully, to return to Congress in 1968, but was defeated in the general election by the incumbent, James Corman. He spent the rest of his career as a business consultant and died in Santa Maria, California, on July 14, 1997.

== Electoral history ==
1952 United States House of Representatives elections in California
Party	Candidate	Votes	%
Republican	Joseph F. Holt	85,039	60.5%
Democratic	Dean E. McHenry	55,534	39.5%
Total votes		140,573	100.0%
Turnout			
Republican win (new seat)			

1954 United States House of Representatives elections in California
Party	Candidate	Votes	%
Republican	Joseph F. Holt (incumbent)	65,165	58.2%
Democratic	William M. "Bill" Costley	46,875	41.8%
Total votes		112,040	100.0%
Turnout			
Republican hold			

1956 United States House of Representatives elections in California
Party	Candidate	Votes	%
Republican	Joseph F. Holt (incumbent)	97,317	59.8%
Democratic	Irving Glasband	65,314	40.2%
Total votes		162,631	100.0%
Turnout			
Republican hold			

1958 United States House of Representatives elections in California
Party	Candidate	Votes	%
Republican	Joseph F. Holt (incumbent)	87,785	55.4%
Democratic	Irving Glasband	70,777	44.6%
Total votes		158,562	100.0%
Turnout			
Republican hold			

1968 United States House of Representatives elections in California
Party	Candidate	Votes	%
Democratic	James C. Corman (incumbent)	102,332	56.9%
Republican	Joe Holt	74,433	41.4%
Peace and Freedom	Hugh Manes	3,024	1.7%
Total votes		179,789	100.0%
Turnout			
Democratic hold			

== Notes ==
U.S. House of Representatives
Preceded by John J. Phillips	Member of the U.S. House of Representatives from California's 22nd congressional district 1953–1961	Succeeded by James C. Corman
