= Randy Villegas =

American educator and politician (born 1994)

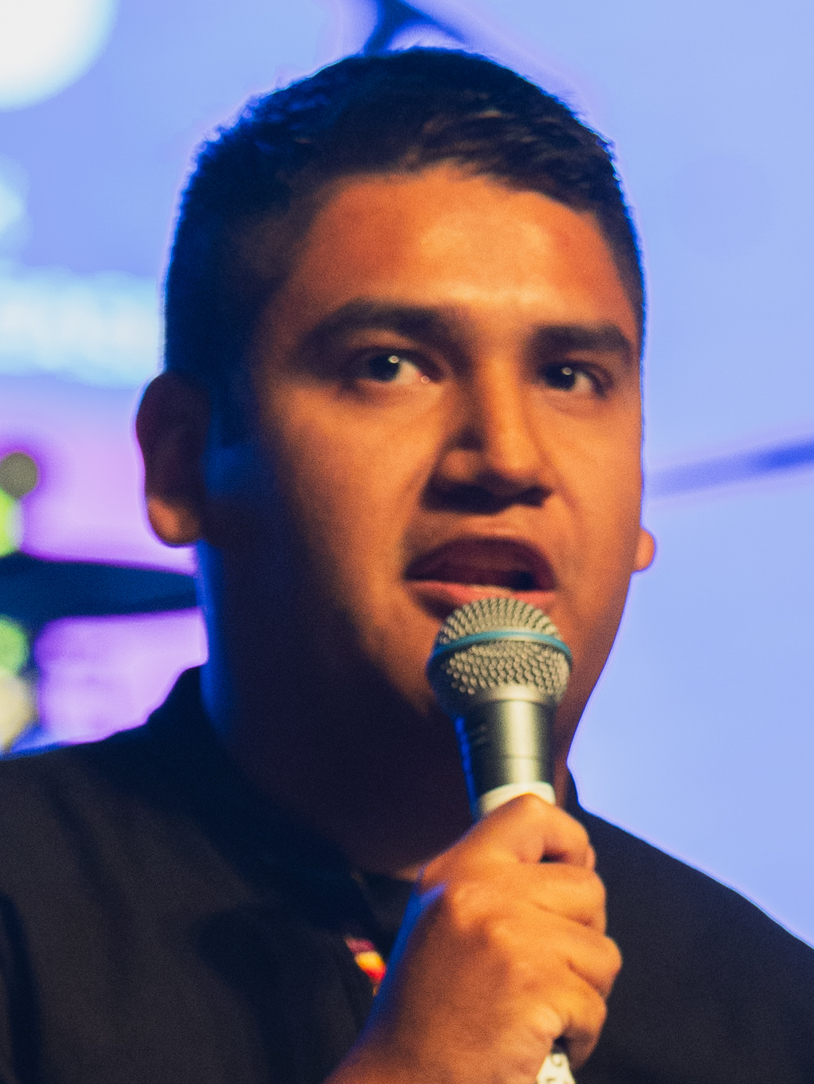
- Villegas in 2024

Member-elect of the U.S. House of Representatives from California's 22nd district
- Assuming office January 3, 2027
- Succeeding: David Valadao

Personal details
- Born: November 12, 1994 (age 32) Bakersfield, California, U.S.
- Party: Democratic
- Education: Bakersfield College (AA); California State University, Bakersfield (BA); University of California, Santa Cruz (MA, PhD)
- Website: Campaign website

Randy Villegas (born November 12, 1994) is an American professor, businessman, and politician. A Democrat, he won the 2026 election for California's 22nd congressional district, which encompasses the southern Central Valley. In California's June 2026 top-two primary, he finished ahead of Democratic state assemblymember Jasmeet Bains and advanced to the general election against Republican incumbent David Valadao. Villegas works as a professor at the College of the Sequoias.

== Early life and education ==
Villegas was born and raised in Bakersfield, California, in California's Central Valley. His parents were Mexican immigrants. His father, a mechanic, was born in Michoacán and his mother in Guerrero. While Villegas was born a United States citizen, his older brother was undocumented and later received protection under Deferred Action for Childhood Arrivals (DACA) in 2012. During his childhood, the family received Medicaid and Supplemental Nutrition Assistance Program. Villegas attended Golden Valley High School, where he played in the drumline.

Villegas was the first member of his family to graduate from college. He earned an associate degree in political science from Bakersfield College and a bachelor's degree from CSU Bakersfield. He subsequently earned a master's degree and a Ph.D. in Politics from the University of California, Santa Cruz on a full tuition fellowship. Villegas completed his doctorate in 2022.

== Career ==
Before attending graduate school, Villegas worked as a journalist and community organizer in Bakersfield. His writing appeared in the Los Angeles Times, The Bakersfield Californian, South Kern Sol, and El Popular.

Villegas is a professor of political science at the College of the Sequoias in Visalia, California. In 2025, the American Political Science Association gave Villegas its Community College Faculty Award.

Villegas co-owns and helps operate his family's auto body shop.

== Political career ==
=== Visalia school board ===
In December 2021, the Visalia Unified School District Board of Education appointed Villegas to fill a vacancy representing Trustee Area 6. In November 2022, Villegas was elected to a full term.

=== 2026 congressional campaign ===
In 2025, Villegas announced his candidacy in the 2026 election for California's 22nd congressional district, which encompasses the southern Central Valley. The seat was considered a "battleground" seat and was held by Republican David Valadao.

In the June 2026 top-two primary, the principal Democratic candidates were Villegas and Jasmeet Bains, a physician and member of the California State Assembly. Bains was endorsed by numerous state party officials and the Democratic Congressional Campaign Committee (DCCC), an unusual intervention by the national party in a contested primary. The DCCC's endorsement caused major disagreement within the Democratic Party. Progressive Democrats criticized the DCCC's intervention and said "voters should pick nominees", including Pramila Jayapal, Greg Casar, and Maxwell Frost, while the DCCC argued that Bains was well positioned to defeat Valadao in the general election. The primary was often framed as a battle between the party's establishment and progressive wings. Outside groups spent more than $2.2 million on advertising against Villegas during the final month of the primary, including organizations associated with centrist Democrats and the Republican Party. The pro-Israel organization Democratic Majority for Israel alone spent over $500,000 against Villegas.

Villegas campaigned as a progressive and left-wing economic populist, with the Associated Press calling him a "populist insurgent". His campaign emphasized the cost of living, health care, labor rights, public education, immigration reform, and opposition to corporate influence in politics. Villegas was endorsed by Bernie Sanders, Alexandria Ocasio-Cortez, Dolores Huerta, Ro Khanna, the Congressional Progressive Caucus, and the California Working Families Party. Despite the DCCC's support for Bains, Villegas secured a key endorsement from the Congressional Hispanic Caucus.

In the June primary results, Valadao finished first with 40.7%, Villegas second with 32.4%, and Bains third with 26.9%. Valadao and Villegas advanced to the general election. Villegas' win against Bains was considered a major "anti-establishment" upset, which CalMatters described as a "stunning rebuke of establishment politics." After the primary, Democratic elected officials who had supported Bains endorsed Villegas for the general election. In June, some progressive members of Congress threatened to withhold their dues from the DCCC unless it changed course. In September, the DCCC endorsed Villegas. Villegas is a rare outspoken progressive in a competitive swing seat, and said he hoped to energize working-class voters with a progressive, economic populist agenda. In September, Bernie Sanders campaigned for Villegas.

== Political positions ==
Villegas is a progressive whose campaign emphasized economic populism and local issues. Villegas supports universal healthcare, expanding the right to organize for labor unions, increased funding for public education, immigration reform, overturning Citizens United v. FEC and expanding public financing for elections.

=== Data centers ===
Villegas supports a one-year moratorium on new data center construction and argues that data centers should pay the full cost for their own electricity.

=== Healthcare ===
Villegas supports Medicare for All, which was central to his platform. Villegas supports a reversal of the One Big Beautiful Bill Act's cuts to Affordable Care Act healthcare subsidies. Villegas also supports price caps on prescription drugs and certain medical procedures.

=== Immigration ===
Villegas supports a pathway to citizenship, banning private detention facilities, prosecuting unlawful Immigrations and Customs Enforcement (ICE) conduct, and a secure border. He does not support abolishing ICE.

== Personal life ==
Villegas lives with his wife, Carina, in Visalia, California.

== Electoral history ==
2026 election in California's 22nd congressional district
Primary election
Party	Candidate	Votes	%
Republican	David Valadao (incumbent)	32,491	40.74
Democratic	Randy Villegas	25,808	32.36
Democratic	Jasmeet Bains	21,458	26.90
Total votes		79,757	100.0
General election
Republican	David Valadao (incumbent)		
Democratic	Randy Villegas		
Total votes			

== See also ==
- Angela Gonzales-Torres

U.S. House of Representatives
Preceded by David Valadao	Member of the U.S. House of Representatives from California's 22nd congressional district Taking office 2027	Elect
