= Potomac Park, California =

Census-designated place near Bakersfield, US

- Unincorporated community Census-designated place
- Location in California Potomac Park, California (the United States)
- Coordinates: 35°21′48.74″N 118°57′53.87″W
- Country: United States
- State: California
- County: Kern County

Area
  - Total: 1.43 sq mi (3.7 km^{2})
  - Land: 1.43 sq mi (3.7 km^{2})
  - Water: 0 sq mi (0 km^{2})
- Elevation: 404 ft (123 m)

Population (2020)
  - Total: 9,164
  - Density: 6,410/sq mi (2,470/km^{2})
- Time zone: UTC-8 (Pacific)
  - Summer (DST): UTC-7 (PDT)
- GNIS feature ID: 2804426

Potomac Park is an unincorporated community and census-designated place (CDP) in Kern County, California, United States. As of the 2020 census, Potomac Park had a population of 9,164. The CDP is within the Bakersfield's census county division, and borders the city of Bakersfield to the west and south, East Bakersfield and Hillcrest to the north, and East Niles to the east. As listed in the Geographic Names Information System, its elevation is 404 feet.

== Demographics ==
Potomac Park first appeared as a census designated place in the 2020 U.S. census.

Historical population
Census	Pop.	Note	%±
2020	9,164		—
U.S. Decennial Census; 1860–1870 1880-1890; 1900 1910 1920; 1930 1940 1950; 1960 1970 1980; 1990 2000 2010; 2020

=== 2020 census ===
As of the 2020 census, Potomac Park had a population of 9,164. This was the first census in which it was included. The median age was 28.5 years. 33.0% of residents were under the age of 18 and 9.7% of residents were 65 years of age or older. For every 100 females there were 99.7 males, and for every 100 females age 18 and over there were 96.5 males age 18 and over.

100.0% of residents lived in urban areas, while 0.0% lived in rural areas.

There were 2,430 households in Potomac Park, of which 53.3% had children under the age of 18 living in them. Of all households, 44.4% were married-couple households, 16.7% were households with a male householder and no spouse or partner present, and 29.1% were households with a female householder and no spouse or partner present. About 13.4% of all households were made up of individuals and 6.3% had someone living alone who was 65 years of age or older.

There were 2,531 housing units, of which 4.0% were vacant. The homeowner vacancy rate was 0.9% and the rental vacancy rate was 2.7%.

Potomac Park CDP, California – Racial and ethnic composition Note: the US Census treats Hispanic/Latino as an ethnic category. This table excludes Latinos from the racial categories and assigns them to a separate category. Hispanics/Latinos may be of any race.
Race / Ethnicity (NH = Non-Hispanic)	Pop 2020	% 2020
White alone (NH)	428	4.67%
Black or African American alone (NH)	274	2.99%
Native American or Alaska Native alone (NH)	48	0.52%
Asian alone (NH)	18	0.20%
Native Hawaiian or Pacific Islander alone (NH)	9	0.10%
Other race alone (NH)	21	0.23%
Mixed race or Multiracial (NH)	66	0.72%
Hispanic or Latino (any race)	8,300	90.57%
Total	9,164	100.00%
