= Benton Park, California =

- Unincorporated community Census designated place
- Location within California
- Coordinates: 35°20′47.18″N 119°1′47.33″W
- Country: United States
- State: California
- County: Kern
- County Subdivision: Bakersfield CCD

Area
  - Total: 0.75 sq mi (1.9 km^{2})
  - Land: 0.75 sq mi (1.9 km^{2})
  - Water: 0 sq mi (0 km^{2})
- Elevation: 394 ft (120 m)

Population (2020)
  - Total: 5,333
  - Density: 7,100/sq mi (2,700/km^{2})
- Time zone: UTC-8 (PST)
  - Summer (DST): UTC-7 (PDT)
- GNIS feature ID: 2804109

Benton Park is a census-designated place (CDP) in Kern County, California, United States. As of the 2020 census, Benton Park had a population of 5,333. Although it is designated by the census as its own place, it is functionally a neighborhood of Bakersfield.

The boundaries of the neighborhood of Benton Park extend further than the boundaries of the CDP.

== Geography ==
Benton Park sits at an elevation of 394 feet (120 m). Benton Park is surrounded on three sides by the city of Bakersfield, but borders Old Stine to the west.

== Demographics ==
Historical population
Census	Pop.	Note	%±
2020	5,333		—
U.S. Decennial Census; 1860–1870 1880-1890; 1900 1910 1920; 1930 1940 1950; 1960 1970 1980; 1990 2000 2010; 2020

=== 2020 census ===
The CDP was first listed in the 2020 census. As of the 2020 census, Benton Park had a population of 5,333. The median age was 31.5 years. 30.0% of residents were under the age of 18 and 11.5% of residents were 65 years of age or older. For every 100 females there were 101.2 males, and for every 100 females age 18 and over there were 96.0 males age 18 and over.

100.0% of residents lived in urban areas, while 0.0% lived in rural areas.

There were 1,630 households in Benton Park, of which 44.0% had children under the age of 18 living in them. Of all households, 40.8% were married-couple households, 21.9% were households with a male householder and no spouse or partner present, and 27.8% were households with a female householder and no spouse or partner present. About 19.1% of all households were made up of individuals and 7.6% had someone living alone who was 65 years of age or older.

There were 1,711 housing units, of which 4.7% were vacant. The homeowner vacancy rate was 1.6% and the rental vacancy rate was 3.7%.

Benton Park CDP, California – Racial and ethnic composition Note: the US Census treats Hispanic/Latino as an ethnic category. This table excludes Latinos from the racial categories and assigns them to a separate category. Hispanics/Latinos may be of any race.
Race / Ethnicity (NH = Non-Hispanic)	Pop 2020	% 2020
White alone (NH)	912	17.10%
Black or African American alone (NH)	427	8.01%
Native American or Alaska Native alone (NH)	14	0.26%
Asian alone (NH)	79	1.48%
Native Hawaiian or Pacific Islander alone (NH)	0	0.00%
Other race alone (NH)	23	0.43%
Mixed race or Multiracial (NH)	113	2.12%
Hispanic or Latino (any race)	3,765	70.60%
Total	5,333	100.00%
