= East Niles, California =

Census-designated place near Bakersfield, US

- Unincorporated community Census-designated place
- Location in California East Niles, California (the United States)
- Coordinates: 35°22′5.78″N 118°55′20.86″W
- Country: United States
- State: California
- County: Kern County

Area
  - Total: 5.458 sq mi (14.14 km^{2})
  - Land: 5.458 sq mi (14.14 km^{2})
  - Water: 0 sq mi (0 km^{2})
- Elevation: 476 ft (145 m)

Population (2020)
  - Total: 28,390
  - Density: 5,202/sq mi (2,008/km^{2})
- Time zone: UTC-8 (Pacific)
  - Summer (DST): UTC-7 (PDT)
- GNIS feature ID: 2804115

East Niles is an unincorporated community and census-designated place (CDP) in Kern County, California. As of the 2020 census, East Niles had a population of 28,390. The CDP is within the Bakersfield's census county division, and borders the city of Bakersfield to the north and the southwest, Bakersfield Country Club to the northwest, Hillcrest and Potomac Park to the west, and Fairfax to the south.

== Details ==
As listed in the Geographic Names Information System, its elevation is 576 feet.

Its population was 28,390 at the 2020 census, the first census it was included in.

== Demographics ==
Historical population
Census	Pop.	Note	%±
2020	28,390		—
U.S. Decennial Census; 1860–1870 1880-1890; 1900 1910 1920; 1930 1940 1950; 1960 1970 1980; 1990 2000 2010; 2020

East Niles first appeared as a census designated place in the 2020 U.S. census.

=== Racial and ethnic composition ===
East Niles CDP, California – Racial and ethnic composition Note: the US Census treats Hispanic/Latino as an ethnic category. This table excludes Latinos from the racial categories and assigns them to a separate category. Hispanics/Latinos may be of any race.
Race / Ethnicity (NH = Non-Hispanic)	Pop 2020	% 2020
White alone (NH)	3,873	13.64%
Black or African American alone (NH)	646	2.28%
Native American or Alaska Native alone (NH)	195	0.69%
Asian alone (NH)	161	0.57%
Native Hawaiian or Pacific Islander alone (NH)	11	0.04%
Other race alone (NH)	118	0.42%
Mixed race or Multiracial (NH)	481	1.69%
Hispanic or Latino (any race)	22,905	80.68%
Total	28,390	100.00%

=== 2020 census ===
As of the 2020 census, East Niles had a population of 28,390. The median age was 29.0 years. 33.0% of residents were under the age of 18 and 9.7% of residents were 65 years of age or older. For every 100 females there were 97.0 males, and for every 100 females age 18 and over there were 93.5 males age 18 and over.

99.8% of residents lived in urban areas, while 0.2% lived in rural areas.

There were 7,604 households in East Niles, of which 51.3% had children under the age of 18 living in them. Of all households, 48.0% were married-couple households, 15.5% were households with a male householder and no spouse or partner present, and 27.3% were households with a female householder and no spouse or partner present. About 14.1% of all households were made up of individuals and 6.8% had someone living alone who was 65 years of age or older.

There were 7,908 housing units, of which 3.8% were vacant. The homeowner vacancy rate was 1.4% and the rental vacancy rate was 3.3%.

Racial composition as of the 2020 census
Race	Number	Percent
White	7,902	27.8%
Black or African American	734	2.6%
American Indian and Alaska Native	865	3.0%
Asian	213	0.8%
Native Hawaiian and Other Pacific Islander	18	0.1%
Some other race	13,608	47.9%
Two or more races	5,050	17.8%
