= Andrea Seastrand =

American politician (born 1941)

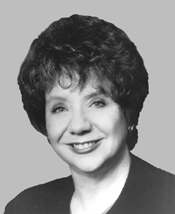

Member of the U.S. House of Representatives from California's 22nd district
- In office January 3, 1995 – January 3, 1997
- Preceded by: Michael Huffington
- Succeeded by: Walter Capps

Member of the California State Assembly from the 33rd district
- In office December 7, 1992 – November 30, 1994
- Preceded by: Trice Harvey
- Succeeded by: Tom J. Bordonaro Jr.

Member of the California State Assembly from the 29th district
- In office December 3, 1990 – November 30, 1992
- Preceded by: Eric Seastrand
- Succeeded by: Bill Jones

Personal details
- Born: Andrea Heidi Ciszek; August 5, 1941 (age 85) Chicago, Illinois, U.S.
- Party: Republican
- Spouse: Eric Seastrand (m. 1965; died 1990)
- Children: 2
- Education: DePaul University (BA)

Andrea Heidi Seastrand (née Ciszek; born August 5, 1941) is a former one-term Republican member of the United States House of Representatives, serving from 1995 to 1997.

== Personal life ==
Seastrand was born Andrea Heidi Ciszek in Chicago. She graduated from DePaul University in 1963 with a B.A. in education, and then moved to Salinas, California to find work as an elementary school teacher. In 1965, she married Eric Seastrand, a stockbroker, and the couple had two children named Kurt and Heidi.

== Political career ==
From 1982 to 1990, when her husband served in the California State Assembly as a Republican, Seastrand joined the California Federation of Republican Women, later becoming its president.

In 1990, Eric Seastrand died of cancer, and Andrea won a special election to succeed him, receiving 65 per cent of the vote. She remained a member of assembly for the next four years, serving on the education committee and as assistant minority leader.

Seastrand was elected to the U.S. House of Representatives in 1994, narrowly defeating Theology professor Walter Capps and succeeding fellow Republican Michael Huffington. Considered one of the more conservative members of the 104th Congress, she faced Capps again in 1996 and was defeated.

== Post-political work ==
In 1997, after her departure from Congress, Seastrand founded the California Space and Technology Alliance—a private nonprofit focused on promoting California's participation in space ventures—which later became the California Space Authority. She remained executive director of the organization from its creation until its dissolution in 2011.

== Electoral history ==
1994 United States House of Representatives elections in California
Party	Candidate	Votes	%
Republican	Andrea Seastrand	102,987	49.27%
Democratic	Walter Capps	101,424	48.53%
Libertarian	David L. Bersohn	4,597	2.20%
Total votes		209,008	100.0%
Turnout			
Republican hold			

1996 United States House of Representatives elections in California
Party	Candidate	Votes	%
Democratic	Walter Capps	118,299	48.5%
Republican	Andrea Seastrand (incumbent)	107,987	44.3%
Independent	Steven Wheeler	9,845	4.0%
Reform	Richard Porter	3,975	1.6%
Libertarian	David Bersohn	2,233	0.9%
Natural Law	Dawn Tomastik	1,847	0.7%
Total votes		244,186	100.0%
Turnout			
Democratic gain from Republican			

== See also ==
- Women in the United States House of Representatives

U.S. House of Representatives
Preceded by Michael Huffington	Member of the U.S. House of Representatives from California's 22nd congressional district 1995–1997	Succeeded by Walter Capps
U.S. order of precedence (ceremonial)
Preceded by Walter Tucker III as Former U.S. Representative	Order of precedence of the United States as Former U.S. Representative	Succeeded by Gloria McLeod as Former U.S. Representative
