= Rexland Acres, California =

Rexland Acres
- Unincorporated community Census-designated place
- Location in California
- Coordinates: 35°18′18″N 118°49′42″W
- Country: United States
- State: California
- County: Kern

Area
  - Total: 0.52 sq mi (1.3 km^{2})
  - Land: 0.52 sq mi (1.3 km^{2})
  - Water: 0 sq mi (0 km^{2})
- Elevation: 367 ft (112 m)

Population (2020)
  - Total: 3,563
  - Density: 6,900/sq mi (2,600/km^{2})
- Time zone: UTC-8 (Pacific (PST))
  - Summer (DST): UTC-7 (PDT)
- ZIP Code: 93307
- Area code: 661
- GNIS feature ID: 2804428

Rexland Acres is an unincorporated community and census-designated place (CDP) in Kern County, California, United States. As of the 2020 census, Rexland Acres had a population of 3,563.

== Geography ==
Rexland Acres is almost entirely enclaved within the city of Bakersfield, except for a small unincorporated area to the northwest. It is located adjacent to Union Avenue, approximately five miles south of downtown Bakersfield.

== Demographics ==
Historical population
Census	Pop.	Note	%±
2020	3,563		—
U.S. Decennial Census; 1860–1870 1880-1890; 1900 1910 1920; 1930 1940 1950; 1960 1970 1980; 1990 2000 2010; 2020

Rexland Acres first appeared as a census designated place in the 2020 U.S. census.

=== 2020 census ===
As of the 2020 census, Rexland Acres had a population of 3,563. The median age was 28.3 years. 33.2% of residents were under the age of 18 and 8.7% of residents were 65 years of age or older. For every 100 females there were 106.3 males, and for every 100 females age 18 and over there were 101.8 males age 18 and over.

100.0% of residents lived in urban areas, while 0.0% lived in rural areas.

There were 880 households in Rexland Acres, of which 54.3% had children under the age of 18 living in them. Of all households, 48.9% were married-couple households, 18.0% were households with a male householder and no spouse or partner present, and 25.0% were households with a female householder and no spouse or partner present. About 11.7% of all households were made up of individuals and 5.4% had someone living alone who was 65 years of age or older.

There were 905 housing units, of which 2.8% were vacant. The homeowner vacancy rate was 0.4% and the rental vacancy rate was 2.5%.

Rexland Acres CDP, California – Racial and ethnic composition Note: the US Census treats Hispanic/Latino as an ethnic category. This table excludes Latinos from the racial categories and assigns them to a separate category. Hispanics/Latinos may be of any race.
Race / Ethnicity (NH = Non-Hispanic)	Pop 2020	% 2020
White alone (NH)	376	10.55%
Black or African American alone (NH)	52	1.46%
Native American or Alaska Native alone (NH)	10	0.28%
Asian alone (NH)	13	0.36%
Native Hawaiian or Pacific Islander alone (NH)	0	0.00%
Other race alone (NH)	7	0.20%
Mixed race or Multiracial (NH)	44	1.23%
Hispanic or Latino (any race)	3,061	85.91%
Total	3,563	100.00%
