= Eric Seastrand =

American businessman and politician

Member of the California State Assembly from the 29th district
- In office December 6, 1982 - June 20, 1990
- Preceded by: Carol Boyd Hallett
- Succeeded by: Andrea Seastrand

Personal details
- Born: February 7, 1938 Fresno, California
- Died: June 20, 1990 (aged 52) Salinas, California
- Party: Republican
- Spouse: Andrea Seastrand (m. 1965)
- Children: 2
- Education: San Jose State University

Eric Seastrand (February 7, 1938 – June 20, 1990) was an American businessman and politician from California and a member of the Republican Party.

Born in Fresno, California, Seastrand served in the United States Army and the United States Air Force. He graduated from San Jose State University and was a stockbroker.

== Political career ==
Seastrand first ran for elective office in 1978, when he challenged freshman Democratic Rep. Leon Panetta in the Monterey-based 16th district. Although the seat had been held by a Republican prior to Panetta's victory, Seastrand was only able to score 38.6% of the vote. In 1980, he ran for an open seat in the California State Senate (then held by Republican Bob Nimmo) but narrowly lost to Democratic assemblyman Henry Mello 48.5% to 48.1%.

In 1982 Seastrand won election to the California State Assembly from the Salinas-San Luis Obispo-based 29th district, succeeding Republican Carol Boyd Hallett. He served from 1982 until his death from cancer in 1990. His wife, Andrea, was elected in a special election to succeed him in the legislature and later served one term in the United States House of Representatives (1995–97).

== Electoral history ==
Member, California State Assembly: 1982-1990
Year	Office	Democrat	Votes	Pct	Republican	Votes	Pct
1978	U.S House of Representatives; District 16	Leon Panetta	104,550	61.4%	Eric Seastrand	65,808	38.6%
1980	California State Senate; District 17	Henry Mello	117,769	48.5%	Eric Seastrand	116,931	48.1%
1982	California State Assembly; District 39	Kurt P. Kupper	40,584	39.6	Eric Seastrand	61,828	60.4%
1984	California State Assembly; District 29	Nell Langford	36,525	28.9%	Eric Seastrand	89,881	71.1%
1986	California State Assembly; District 29	Robert B. Webber	26,017	26.2%	Eric Seastrand	71,790	72.4%
1988	California State Assembly; District 29	Jan Bradford	44,070	32.9%	Eric Seastrand	89,935	67.1%

== Notes ==
California Assembly
Preceded by Carol Boyd Hallett	Member of the California State Assembly from the 29th district December 6, 1982 - June 20, 1990	Succeeded by Andrea Seastrand
