= Old Stine, California =

Census-designated place near Bakersfield, California, U.S.

- Unincorporated community Census-designated place
- Location in California Old Stine, California (the United States)
- Coordinates: 35°20′51.90″N 119°2′48.92″W
- Country: United States
- State: California
- County: Kern

Area
  - Total: 0.617 sq mi (1.598 km^{2})
  - Land: 0.617 sq mi (1.598 km^{2})
  - Water: 0 sq mi (0 km^{2})
- Elevation: 390 ft (120 m)

Population (2020)
  - Total: 3,841
  - Density: 6,225/sq mi (2,404/km^{2})
- Time zone: UTC-8 (Pacific)
  - Summer (DST): UTC-7 (PDT)
- GNIS feature ID: 2804425

Old Stine is a census-designated place (CDP) in Kern County, California, United States. The CDP is within Bakersfield's census county division, and surrounded by the city of Bakersfield on all sides except for the east, where it borders Benton Park. As listed in the Geographic Names Information System, its elevation is 390 feet.

Its population was 3,841 at the 2020 census.

== Demographics ==
Historical population
Census	Pop.	Note	%±
2020	3,841		—
U.S. Decennial Census; 1860–1870 1880-1890; 1900 1910 1920; 1930 1940 1950; 1960 1970 1980; 1990 2000 2010; 2020

Old Stine first appeared as a census designated place in the 2020 U.S. census.

=== 2020 census ===
As of the 2020 census, Old Stine had a population of 3,841.

The median age was 31.5 years. 29.4% of residents were under the age of 18 and 11.8% were 65 years of age or older. For every 100 females, there were 97.8 males, and for every 100 females age 18 and over, there were 94.0 males age 18 and over.

100.0% of residents lived in urban areas, while 0.0% lived in rural areas.

There were 1,232 households, of which 42.0% had children under the age of 18 living in them. Of all households, 41.9% were married-couple households, 20.0% were households with a male householder and no spouse or partner present, and 28.8% were households with a female householder and no spouse or partner present. About 21.0% of all households were made up of individuals, and 9.3% had someone living alone who was 65 years of age or older.

There were 1,302 housing units, of which 5.4% were vacant. The homeowner vacancy rate was 2.3% and the rental vacancy rate was 3.7%.

Old Stine CDP, California – Racial and ethnic composition Note: the US Census treats Hispanic/Latino as an ethnic category. This table excludes Latinos from the racial categories and assigns them to a separate category. Hispanics/Latinos may be of any race.
Race / Ethnicity (NH = Non-Hispanic)	Pop 2020	% 2020
White alone (NH)	1,044	27.18%
Black or African American alone (NH)	327	8.51%
Native American or Alaska Native alone (NH)	40	1.04%
Asian alone (NH)	82	2.13%
Native Hawaiian or Pacific Islander alone (NH)	4	0.10%
Other race alone (NH)	21	0.55%
Mixed race or Multiracial (NH)	108	2.81%
Hispanic or Latino (any race)	2,215	57.67%
Total	3,841	100.00%
