= La Cresta, Kern County, California =

CDP in Kern County, California

La Cresta, California
- Unincorporated community Census-designated place
- Location in California La Cresta, California (the United States)
- Coordinates: 35°23′48.92″N 118°59′21.52″W
- Country: United States
- State: California
- County: Kern

Area
  - Total: 1.046 sq mi (2.71 km^{2})
  - Land: 1.046 sq mi (2.71 km^{2})
  - Water: 0 sq mi (0 km^{2})
- Elevation: 518 ft (158 m)

Population (2020)
  - Total: 8,787
  - Density: 8,401/sq mi (3,243/km^{2})
- Time zone: UTC-8 (Pacific)
  - Summer (DST): UTC-7 (PDT)
- GNIS feature ID: 2804420

La Cresta is a census-designated place (CDP) in Kern County, California, United States. The CDP is within Bakersfield's census county division, and is surrounded by the city of Bakersfield on most sides, but borders East Bakersfield to the southeast. Its population was 8,787 at the 2020 census.

== Details ==
As listed in the Geographic Names Information System, its elevation is 518 feet.

== Demographics ==
Historical population
Census	Pop.	Note	%±
2020	8,787		—
U.S. Decennial Census; 1860–1870 1880-1890; 1900 1910 1920; 1930 1940 1950; 1960 1970 1980; 1990 2000 2010; 2020

La Cresta first appeared as a census designated place in the 2020 U.S. census.

=== 2020 Census ===
La Cresta CDP, California – Racial and ethnic composition Note: the US Census treats Hispanic/Latino as an ethnic category. This table excludes Latinos from the racial categories and assigns them to a separate category. Hispanics/Latinos may be of any race.
Race / Ethnicity (NH = Non-Hispanic)	Pop 2020	% 2020
White alone (NH)	1,731	19.70%
Black or African American alone (NH)	397	4.52%
Native American or Alaska Native alone (NH)	29	0.33%
Asian alone (NH)	81	0.92%
Native Hawaiian or Pacific Islander alone (NH)	8	0.09%
Other race alone (NH)	43	0.49%
Mixed race or Multiracial (NH)	207	2.36%
Hispanic or Latino (any race)	6,291	71.59%
Total	8,787	100.00%
