= Hillcrest, Kern County, California =

Census-designated place in California

Hillcrest, California
- Unincorporated community Census-designated place
- Location in California Hillcrest, California (the United States)
- Coordinates: 35°22′44″N 118°57′28″W
- Country: United States
- State: California
- County: Kern

Area
  - Total: 1.378 sq mi (3.57 km^{2})
  - Land: 1.378 sq mi (3.57 km^{2})
  - Water: 0 sq mi (0 km^{2})

Population (2020)
  - Total: 10,528
  - Density: 7,640/sq mi (2,950/km^{2})
- Time zone: UTC-8 (Pacific)
  - Summer (DST): UTC-7 (PDT)
- GNIS feature ID: 2804409

Hillcrest is an unincorporated community and census-designated place (CDP) in Kern County, California, United States. The population was 10,528 at the 2020 census.

== Demographics ==
Historical population
| Census | Pop. | Note | %± |
|---|---|---|---|
| 2020 | 10,528 | | — |
U.S. Decennial Census; 1860–1870 1880-1890; 1900 1910 1920; 1930 1940 1950; 1960 1970 1980; 1990 2000 2010; 2020

Hillcrest first appeared as a census designated place in the 2020 U.S. census.

=== 2020 Census ===
Hillcrest CDP, California – Racial and ethnic composition Note: the US Census treats Hispanic/Latino as an ethnic category. This table excludes Latinos from the racial categories and assigns them to a separate category. Hispanics/Latinos may be of any race.
| Race / Ethnicity (NH = Non-Hispanic) | Pop 2020 | % 2020 |
|---|---|---|
| White alone (NH) | 1,434 | 13.62% |
| Black or African American alone (NH) | 315 | 2.99% |
| Native American or Alaska Native alone (NH) | 64 | 0.61% |
| Asian alone (NH) | 48 | 0.46% |
| Native Hawaiian or Pacific Islander alone (NH) | 15 | 0.14% |
| Other race alone (NH) | 46 | 0.44% |
| Mixed race or Multiracial (NH) | 159 | 1.51% |
| Hispanic or Latino (any race) | 8,447 | 80.23% |
| Total | 10,528 | 100.00% |
