= 2010 United States House of Representatives elections in California =

- November 2, 2010

All 53 California seats to the United States House of Representatives
	Majority party	Minority party
Party	Democratic	Republican
Last election	34	19
Seats won	34	19
Seat change	Steady	Steady
Popular vote	5,149,450	4,195,513
Percentage	53.39%	43.50%
Swing	▼6.51%	▲6.85%

Democratic hold
Republican hold
Democratic
40–50%
50–60%
60–70%
70–80%
80–90%
Republican
50–60%
60–70%
70–80%
80–90%
90–100%

The 2010 United States House of Representatives elections in California were held on November 2, 2010, to determine who would represent California's various congressional districts in the United States House of Representatives. In the 112th Congress, California has 53 seats in the House, apportioned accordingly after the 2000 United States census. Representatives were elected to two-year terms; those elected serve in the 112th Congress from January 3, 2011, to January 3, 2013.

According to CQ Politics, the districts considered the most competitive are the 3rd and 11th, with the 44th, 45th, and 47th as less than safe as well. The Cook Report includes the 18th and 20th.

Two districts elected new Representatives that year. Republican George Radanovich of the 19th district was succeeded by Republican Jeff Denham, and Democrat Diane Watson of the 33rd district was succeeded by Democrat Karen Bass. However, the partisan balance of the state's congressional delegation did not change, despite the strong Republican dominance in a multitude of other areas of the country.

== Overview ==
United States House of Representatives elections in California, 2010
Party	Votes	Percentage	Seats	+/–
Democratic	5,149,450	53.39%	34	Steady
Republican	4,195,513	43.50%	19	Steady
Libertarian	142,363	1.48%	0	Steady
American Independent	56,907	0.59%	0	Steady
Green	46,626	0.48%	0	Steady
Peace and Freedom	30,714	0.32%	0	Steady
Independent	23,639	0.24%	0	Steady
Totals	9,645,212	100.00%	53	—
Voter turnout	55.80%			

=== By district ===
Results of the 2010 United States House of Representatives elections in California by district:

District	Democratic		Republican		Others		Total		Result
District	Votes	%	Votes	%	Votes	%	Votes	%	Result
District 1	147,307	62.79%	72,803	31.03%	14,482	6.17%	234,592	100.0%	Democratic hold
District 2	98,092	42.85%	130,837	57.15%	11	0.00%	228,940	100.0%	Republican hold
District 3	113,128	43.19%	131,169	50.08%	17,641	6.73%	261,938	100.0%	Republican hold
District 4	95,653	31.44%	186,397	61.27%	22,179	7.29%	304,229	100.0%	Republican hold
District 5	124,220	72.05%	43,577	25.28%	4,613	2.68%	172,410	100.0%	Democratic hold
District 6	172,216	65.94%	77,361	29.62%	11,575	4.43%	261,152	100.0%	Democratic hold
District 7	122,435	68.32%	56,764	31.68%	0	0.00%	179,199	100.0%	Democratic hold
District 8	167,957	80.10%	31,711	15.12%	10,028	4.78%	209,696	100.0%	Democratic hold
District 9	180,400	84.27%	23,054	10.77%	10,631	4.97%	214,085	100.0%	Democratic hold
District 10	137,578	58.84%	88,512	37.86%	7,716	3.30%	233,806	100.0%	Democratic hold
District 11	115,361	47.97%	112,703	46.86%	12,439	5.17%	240,503	100.0%	Democratic hold
District 12	152,044	75.58%	44,475	22.11%	4,643	2.31%	201,162	100.0%	Democratic hold
District 13	118,278	71.95%	45,575	27.73%	525	0.32%	164,378	100.0%	Democratic hold
District 14	151,217	69.09%	60,917	27.83%	6,735	3.08%	218,869	100.0%	Democratic hold
District 15	126,147	67.60%	60,468	32.40%	0	0.00%	186,615	100.0%	Democratic hold
District 16	105,841	67.82%	37,913	24.29%	12,304	7.88%	156,058	100.0%	Democratic hold
District 17	118,734	66.65%	53,176	29.85%	6,229	3.50%	178,139	100.0%	Democratic hold
District 18	72,853	58.48%	51,716	41.52%	0	0.00%	124,569	100.0%	Democratic hold
District 19	69,912	35.15%	128,394	64.55%	596	0.30%	198,902	100.0%	Republican hold
District 20	46,247	51.70%	43,197	48.30%	0	0.00%	89,444	100.0%	Democratic hold
District 21	0	0.00%	135,979	100.00%	0	0.00%	135,979	100.0%	Republican hold
District 22	0	0.00%	173,490	98.76%	2,173	1.24%	175,663	100.0%	Republican hold
District 23	111,768	57.77%	72,744	37.60%	8,951	4.63%	193,463	100.0%	Democratic hold
District 24	96,279	40.06%	144,055	59.94%	0	0.00%	240,334	100.0%	Republican hold
District 25	73,028	38.17%	118,308	61.83%	0	0.00%	191,336	100.0%	Republican hold
District 26	76,093	36.52%	112,774	54.13%	19,480	9.35%	208,347	100.0%	Republican hold
District 27	102,927	65.15%	55,056	34.85%	0	0.00%	157,983	100.0%	Democratic hold
District 28	88,385	69.54%	28,493	22.42%	10,229	8.05%	127,107	100.0%	Democratic hold
District 29	104,374	64.78%	51,534	31.98%	5,218	3.24%	161,126	100.0%	Democratic hold
District 30	153,663	64.63%	75,948	31.94%	8,136	3.42%	237,747	100.0%	Democratic hold
District 31	76,363	83.82%	14,740	16.18%	3	0.00%	91,106	100.0%	Democratic hold
District 32	77,759	71.04%	31,697	28.96%	0	0.00%	109,456	100.0%	Democratic hold
District 33	131,990	86.08%	21,342	13.92%	1	0.00%	153,333	100.0%	Democratic hold
District 34	69,382	77.23%	20,457	22.77%	0	0.00%	89,839	100.0%	Democratic hold
District 35	98,131	79.33%	25,561	20.66%	2	0.00%	123,694	100.0%	Democratic hold
District 36	114,489	59.62%	66,706	34.74%	10,840	5.64%	192,035	100.0%	Democratic hold
District 37	85,799	68.36%	29,159	23.23%	10,560	8.41%	125,518	100.0%	Democratic hold
District 38	85,459	73.45%	30,883	26.55%	0	0.00%	116,342	100.0%	Democratic hold
District 39	81,590	63.27%	42,037	32.60%	5,334	4.14%	128,961	100.0%	Democratic hold
District 40	59,400	33.21%	119,455	66.79%	0	0.00%	178,855	100.0%	Republican hold
District 41	74,394	36.78%	127,857	63.21%	35	0.02%	202,286	100.0%	Republican hold
District 42	65,122	31.86%	127,161	62.21%	12,115	5.93%	204,398	100.0%	Republican hold
District 43	70,026	65.50%	36,890	34.50%	0	0.00%	106,916	100.0%	Democratic hold
District 44	85,784	44.39%	107,482	55.61%	0	0.00%	193,266	100.0%	Republican hold
District 45	87,141	42.14%	106,472	51.49%	13,188	6.38%	206,801	100.0%	Republican hold
District 46	84,940	37.79%	139,822	62.20%	20	0.01%	224,782	100.0%	Republican hold
District 47	50,832	52.98%	37,679	39.27%	7,443	7.76%	95,954	100.0%	Democratic hold
District 48	88,465	36.45%	145,481	59.94%	8,773	3.61%	242,719	100.0%	Republican hold
District 49	59,714	31.48%	119,088	62.78%	10,875	5.73%	189,677	100.0%	Republican hold
District 50	97,818	38.96%	142,247	56.65%	11,016	4.39%	251,081	100.0%	Republican hold
District 51	86,423	60.05%	57,488	39.95%	5	0.00%	143,916	100.0%	Democratic hold
District 52	70,870	32.06%	139,460	63.09%	10,732	4.85%	221,062	100.0%	Republican hold
District 53	104,800	62.26%	57,230	34.00%	6,298	3.74%	168,328	100.0%	Democratic hold
Total	5,148,828	53.37%	4,195,494	43.49%	303,774	3.15%	9,648,096	100.0%	

Popular vote
Democratic	53.39%
Republican	43.50%
Libertarian	1.48%
Other	1.63%

House seats
Democratic	64.15%
Republican	35.85%

== District 1 ==
2010 California's 1st congressional district election
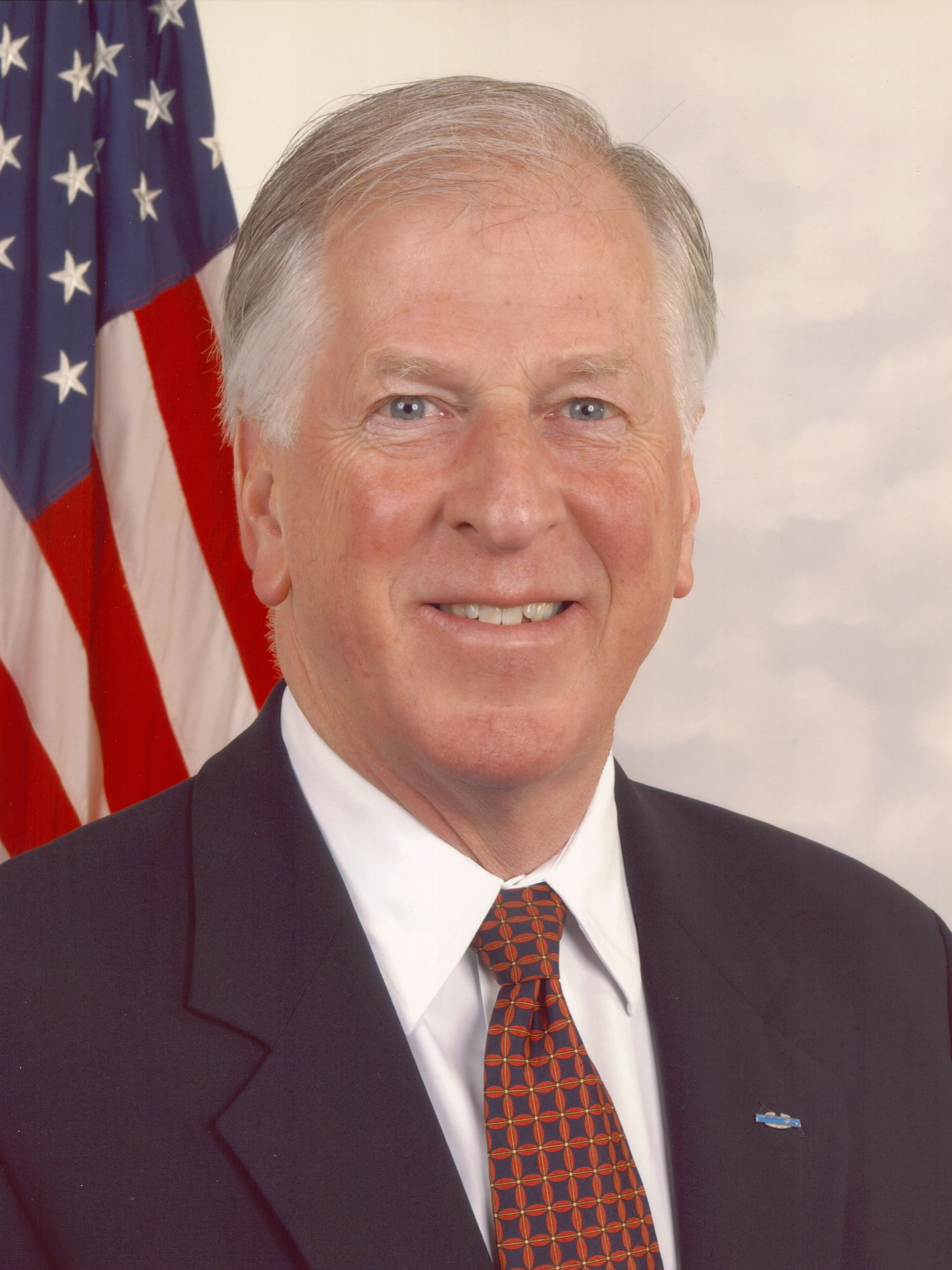

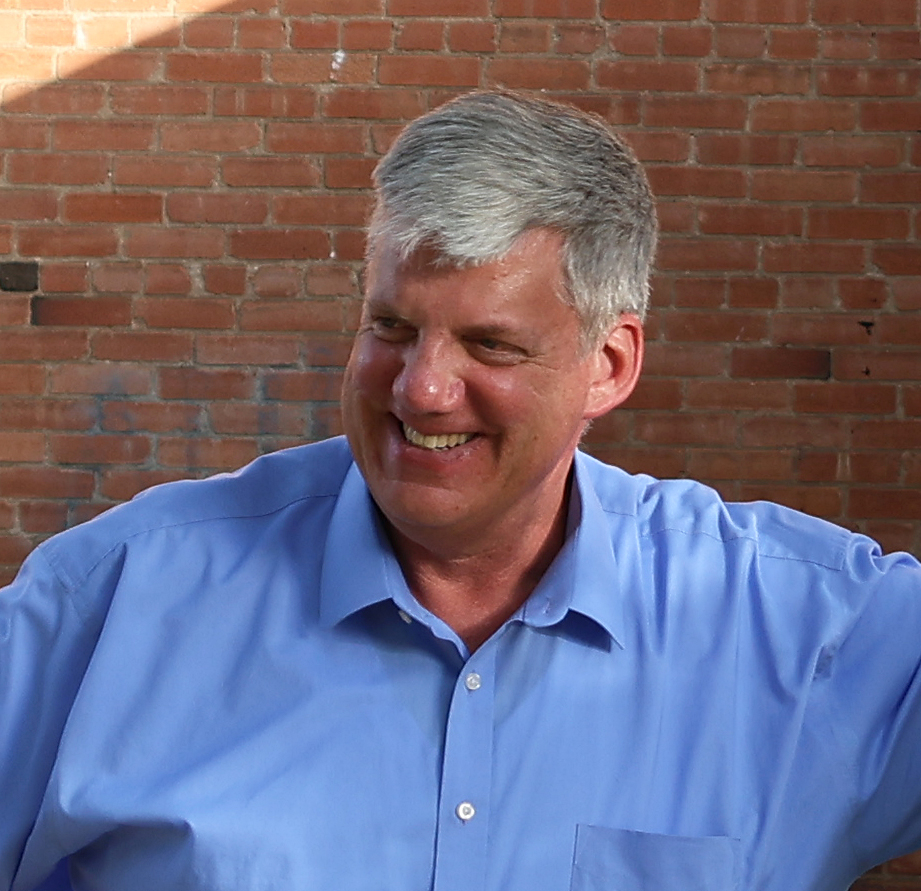
Nominee	Mike Thompson	Loren Hanks
Party	Democratic	Republican
Popular vote	147,307	72,803
Percentage	62.8%	31.1%
- County results Thompson: 40–50% 50–60% 60–70%
U.S. Representative before election
Mike Thompson
Democratic
Elected U.S. Representative
Mike Thompson
Democratic

California's 1st congressional district (map) has been represented by Democrat Mike Thompson of St. Helena since January 3, 1999.

- Race ranking and details from CQ Politics
- Campaign contributions from OpenSecrets
- Race profile at The New York Times

=== Predictions ===
Source	Ranking	As of
The Cook Political Report	Safe D	November 1, 2010
Rothenberg	Safe D	November 1, 2010
Sabato's Crystal Ball	Safe D	November 1, 2010
RCP	Safe D	November 1, 2010
CQ Politics	Safe D	October 28, 2010
New York Times	Safe D	November 1, 2010
FiveThirtyEight	Safe D	November 1, 2010

California's 1st congressional district election, 2010
Party	Candidate	Votes	%
Democratic	Mike Thompson (incumbent)	147,307	62.8
Republican	Loren Hanks	72,803	31.1
Green	Carol Wolman	8,486	3.6
Libertarian	Mike Rodrigues	5,996	2.5
Total votes		234,592	100.0
Democratic hold			

== District 2 ==
2010 California's 2nd congressional district election
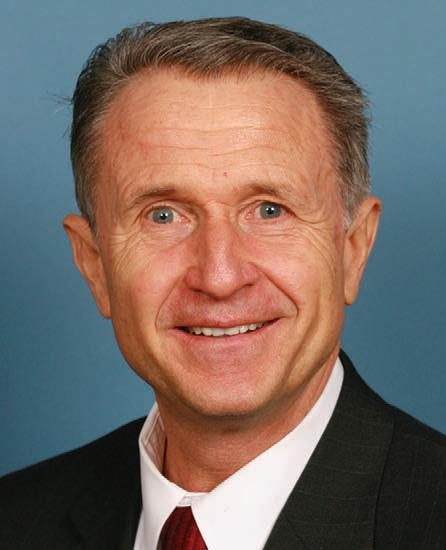

Nominee	Wally Herger	Jim Reed
Party	Republican	Democratic
Popular vote	130,837	98,092
Percentage	57.2%	42.8%
- County results Herger: 50–60% 60–70% Reed: 50–60%
U.S. Representative before election
Wally Herger
Republican
Elected U.S. Representative
Wally Herger
Republican

California's 2nd congressional district (map) has been represented by Republican Wally Herger of Chico since January 3, 1987.

- Race ranking and details from CQ Politics
- Campaign contributions from OpenSecrets
- Race profile at The New York Times

=== Predictions ===
Source	Ranking	As of
The Cook Political Report	Safe R	November 1, 2010
Rothenberg	Safe R	November 1, 2010
Sabato's Crystal Ball	Safe R	November 1, 2010
RCP	Safe R	November 1, 2010
CQ Politics	Safe R	October 28, 2010
New York Times	Safe R	November 1, 2010
FiveThirtyEight	Safe R	November 1, 2010

California's 2nd congressional district election, 2010
Party	Candidate	Votes	%
Republican	Wally Herger (incumbent)	130,837	57.2
Democratic	Jim Reed	98,092	42.8
Independent	Mark A. Jensen (write-in)	11	0.0
Total votes		228,940	100.0
Republican hold			

== District 3 ==
2010 California's 3rd congressional district election
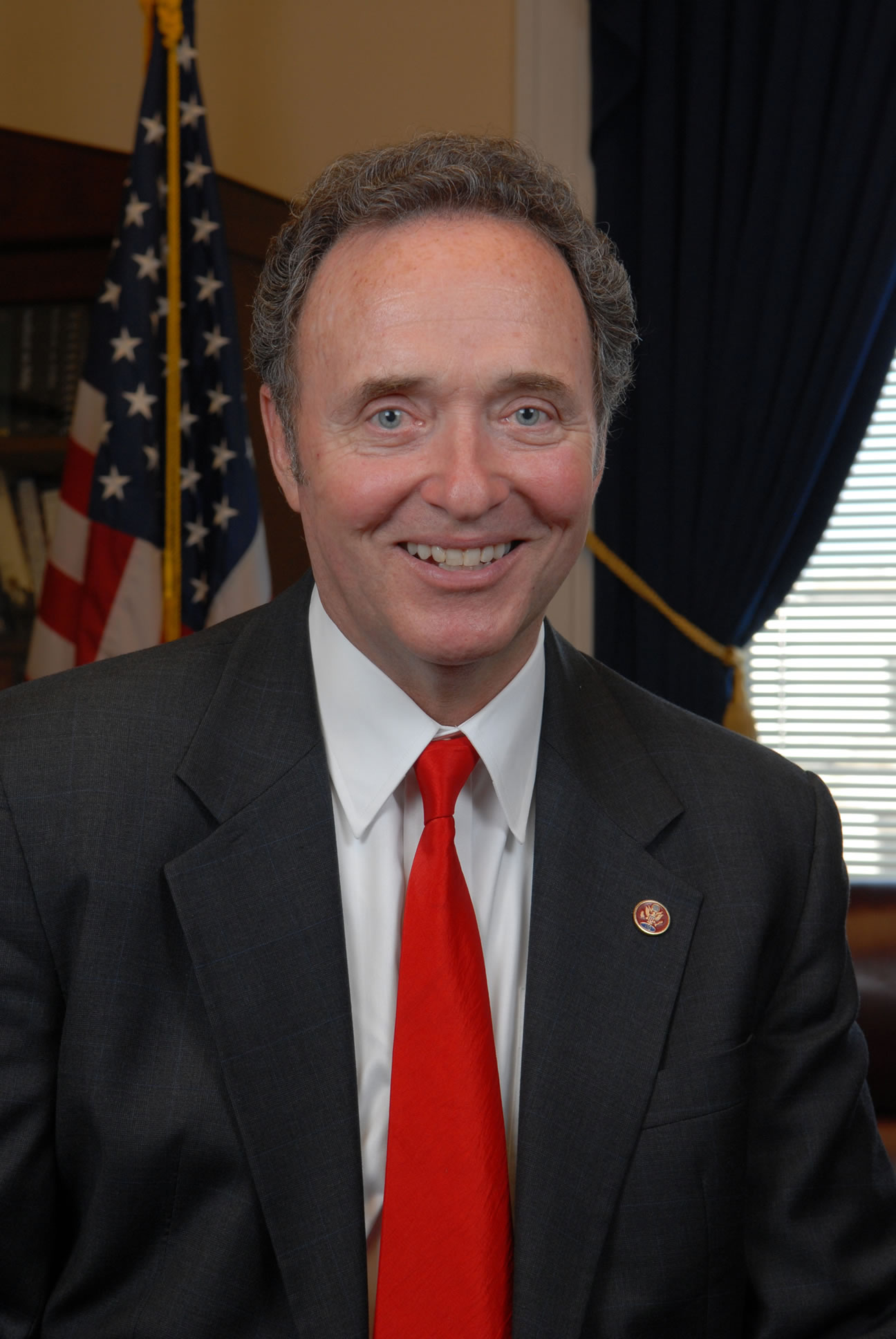

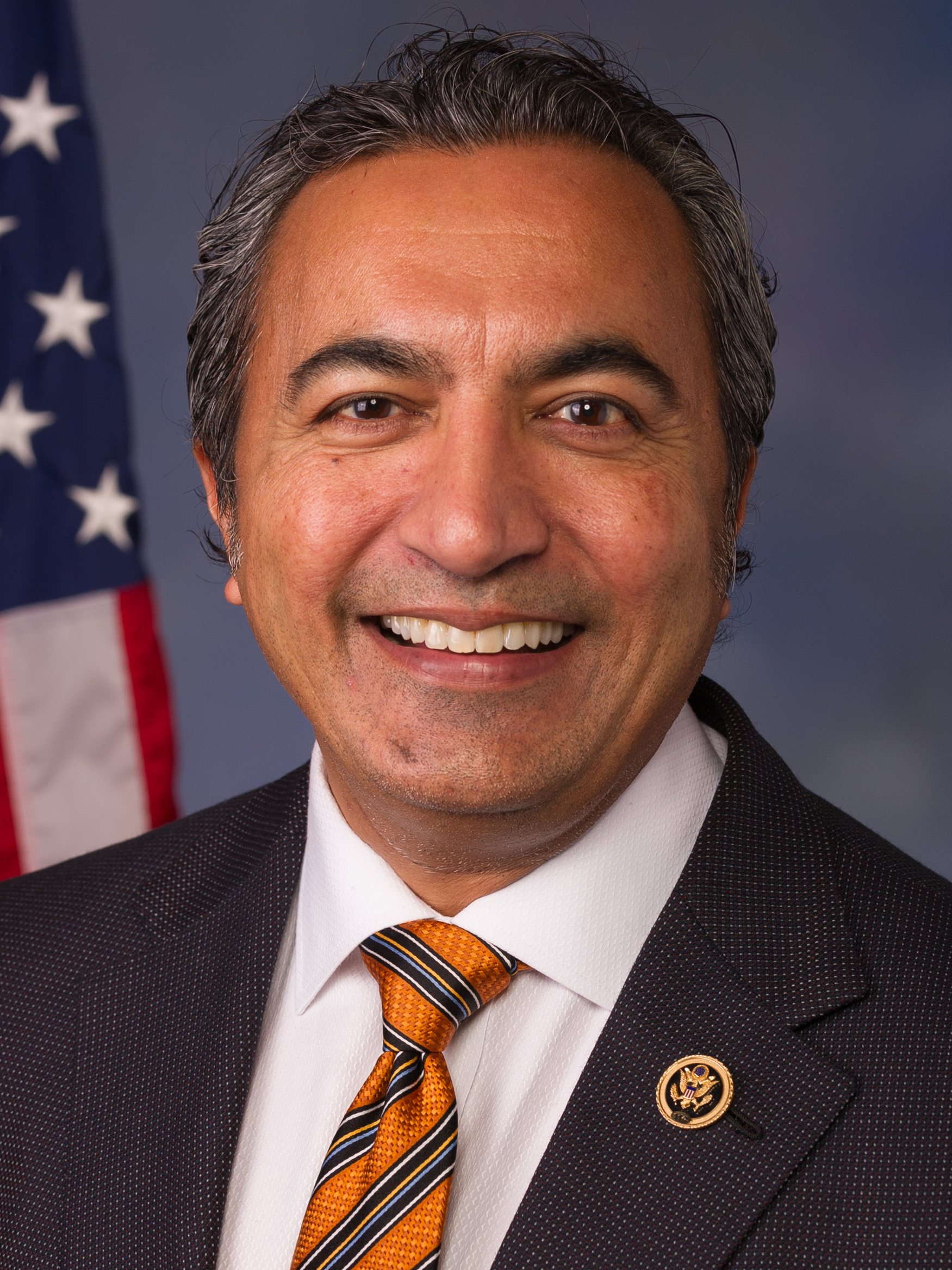
Nominee	Dan Lungren	Ami Bera
Party	Republican	Democratic
Popular vote	131,169	113,128
Percentage	50.1%	43.2%
- County results Lungren: 40–50% 50–60% Bera: 50–60%
U.S. Representative before election
Dan Lungren
Republican
Elected U.S. Representative
Dan Lungren
Republican

California's 3rd congressional district (map) has been represented by Republican Dan Lungren of Gold River since January 3, 2005. In May 2016, Babulal Bera, Ami Bera's father, pleaded guilty to two felony counts of election fraud affecting the 2010 and 2012 elections, and was convicted of illegally funneling $250,000 to Bera's campaigns between 2010 and 2012.

- Race ranking and details from CQ Politics
- Campaign contributions from OpenSecrets
- Race profile at The New York Times

=== Predictions ===
Source	Ranking	As of
The Cook Political Report	Lean R	November 1, 2010
Rothenberg	Lean R	November 1, 2010
Sabato's Crystal Ball	Lean R	November 1, 2010
RCP	Lean R	November 1, 2010
CQ Politics	Lean R	October 28, 2010
New York Times	Lean R	November 1, 2010
FiveThirtyEight	Likely R	November 1, 2010

California's 3rd congressional district election, 2010
Party	Candidate	Votes	%
Republican	Dan Lungren (incumbent)	131,169	50.1
Democratic	Ami Bera	113,128	43.2
American Independent	Jerry L. Leidecker	6,577	2.5
Libertarian	Douglas Arthur Tuma	6,275	2.4
Peace and Freedom	Mike Roskey	4,789	1.8
Total votes		261,938	100.0
Republican hold			

== District 4 ==
2010 California's 4th congressional district election
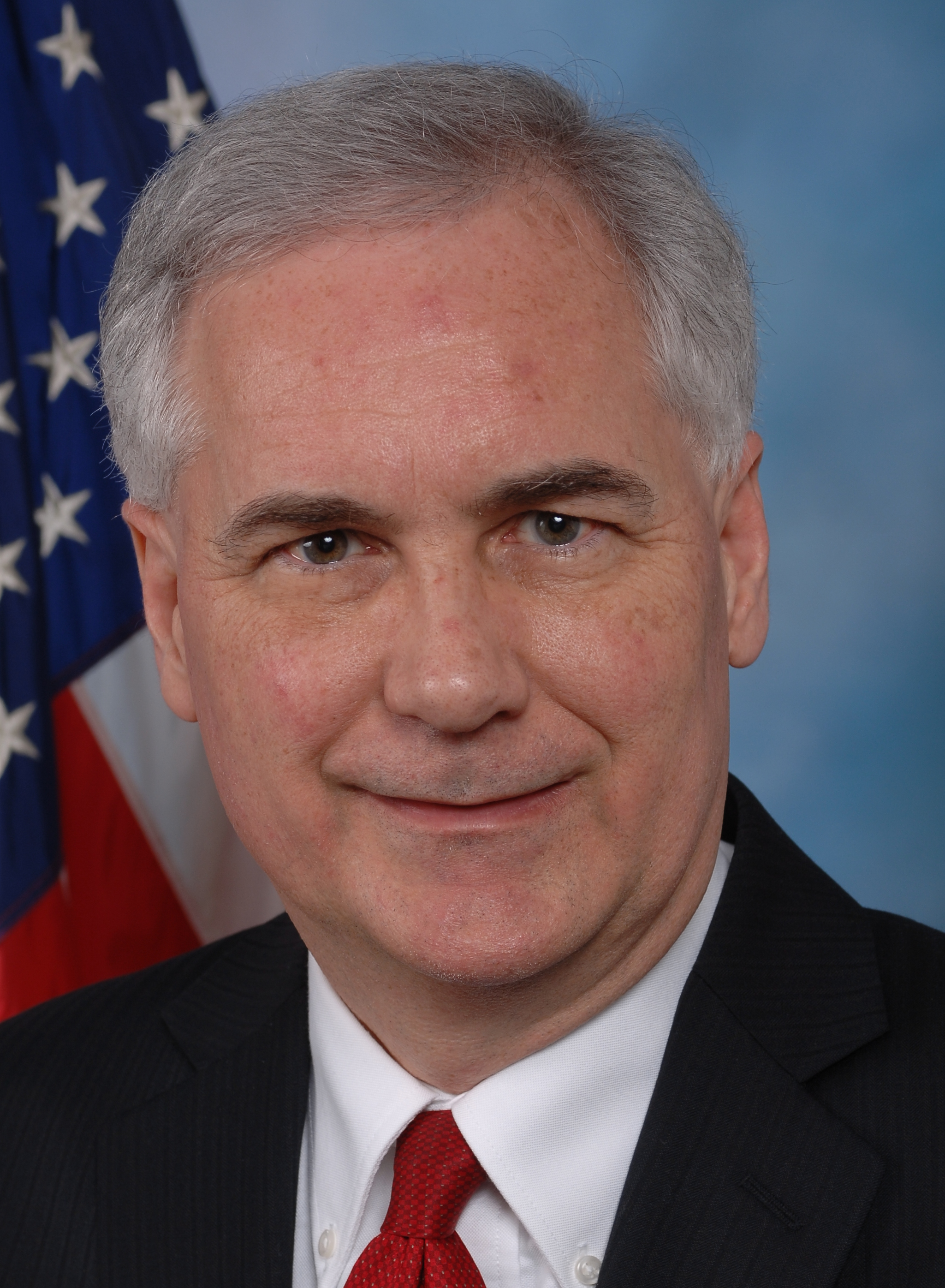

Nominee	Tom McClintock	Clint Curtis	Benjamin "Ben" Emery
Party	Republican	Democratic	Green
Popular vote	186,397	95,653	22,179
Percentage	61.3%	31.5%	7.2%
- County results Mcclintock: 50–60% 60–70% 70–80%
U.S. Representative before election
Tom McClintock
Republican
Elected U.S. Representative
Tom McClintock
Republican

California's 4th congressional district (map) has been represented by Republican Tom McClintock of Roseville since January 3, 2009.

- Race ranking and details from CQ Politics
- Campaign contributions from OpenSecrets
- Race profile at The New York Times

=== Predictions ===
Source	Ranking	As of
The Cook Political Report	Safe R	November 1, 2010
Rothenberg	Safe R	November 1, 2010
Sabato's Crystal Ball	Safe R	November 1, 2010
RCP	Safe R	November 1, 2010
CQ Politics	Safe R	October 28, 2010
New York Times	Safe R	November 1, 2010
FiveThirtyEight	Safe R	November 1, 2010

California's 4th congressional district election, 2010
Party	Candidate	Votes	%
Republican	Tom McClintock (incumbent)	186,397	61.3
Democratic	Clint Curtis	95,653	31.5
Green	Benjamin "Ben" Emery	22,179	7.2
Total votes		304,229	100.0
Republican hold			

== District 5 ==
2010 California's 5th congressional district election
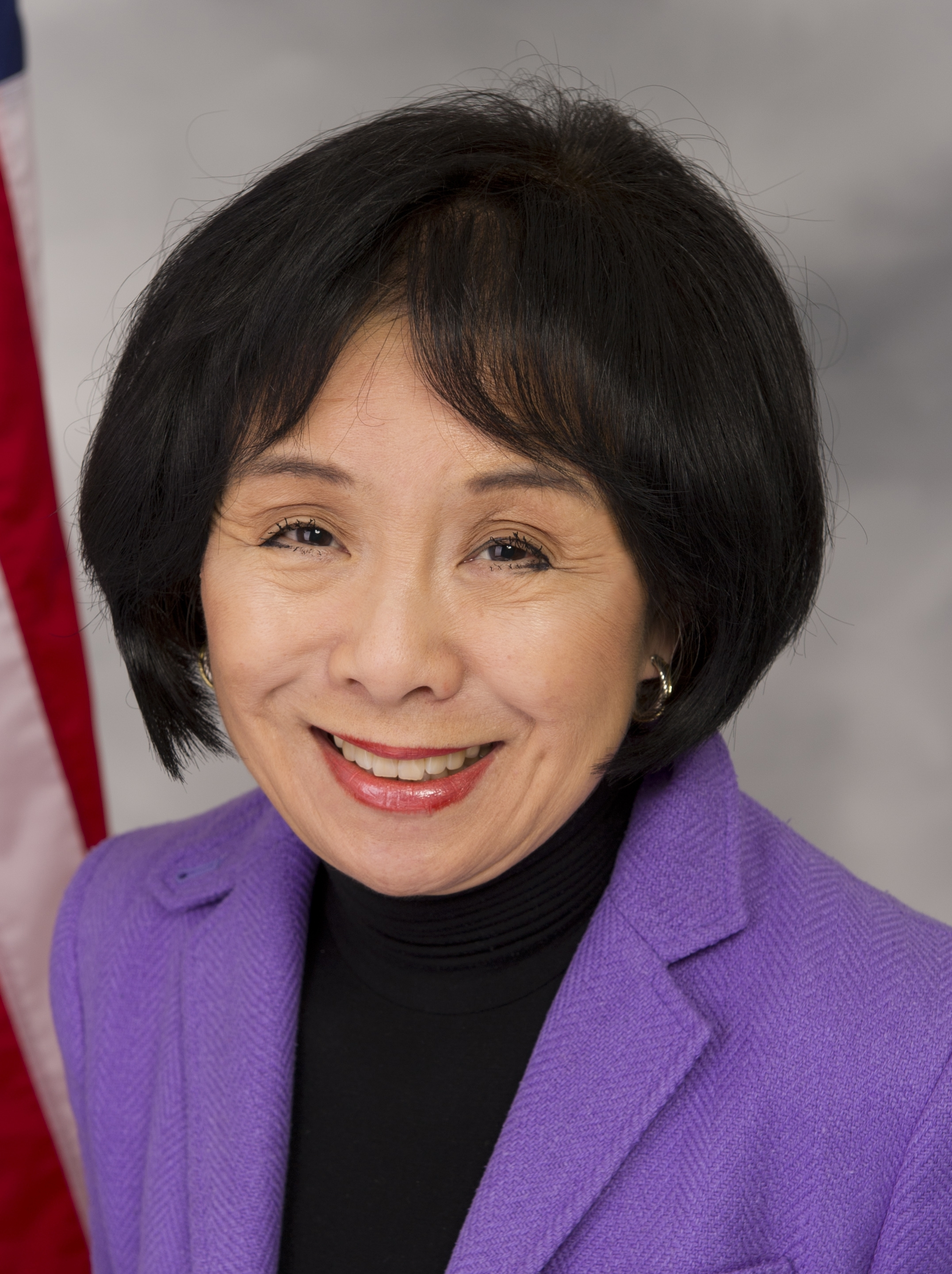

Nominee	Doris Matsui	Paul A. Smith
Party	Democratic	Republican
Popular vote	124,220	43,577
Percentage	72.1%	25.3%
- County results Matsui: 70–80%
U.S. Representative before election
Doris Matsui
Democratic
Elected U.S. Representative
Doris Matsui
Democratic

California's 5th congressional district (map) has been represented by Democrat Doris Matsui of Sacramento since March 8, 2005.

- Race ranking and details from CQ Politics
- Campaign contributions from OpenSecrets
- Race profile at The New York Times

=== Predictions ===
Source	Ranking	As of
The Cook Political Report	Safe D	November 1, 2010
Rothenberg	Safe D	November 1, 2010
Sabato's Crystal Ball	Safe D	November 1, 2010
RCP	Safe D	November 1, 2010
CQ Politics	Safe D	October 28, 2010
New York Times	Safe D	November 1, 2010
FiveThirtyEight	Safe D	November 1, 2010

California's 5th congressional district election, 2010
Party	Candidate	Votes	%
Democratic	Doris Matsui (incumbent)	124,220	72.1
Republican	Paul A. Smith	43,577	25.3
Peace and Freedom	Gerald Allen Frink	4,594	2.6
Republican	Tony Lacy (write-in)	19	0.0
Total votes		172,410	100.0
Democratic hold			

== District 6 ==
2010 California's 6th congressional district election
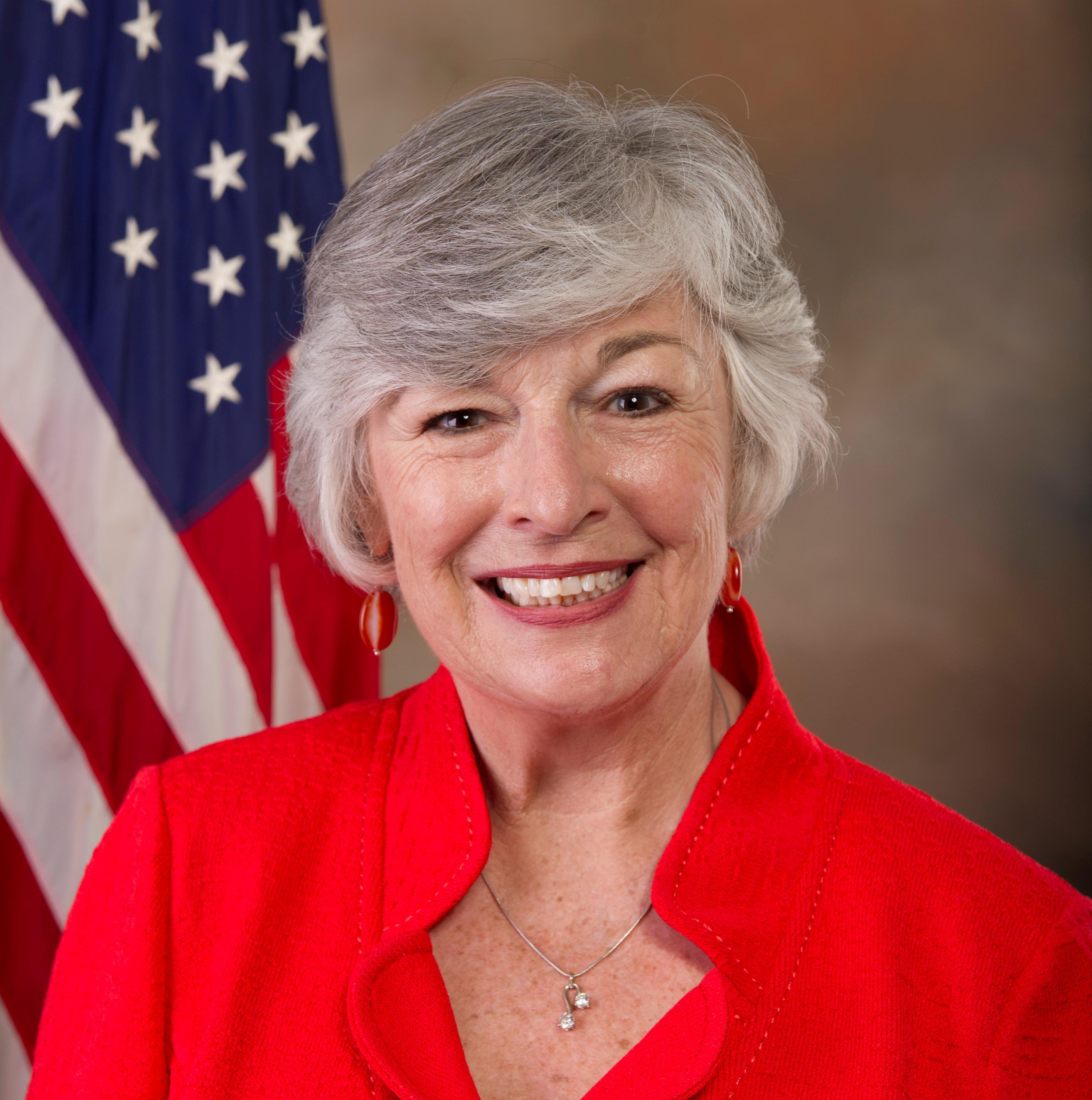

Nominee	Lynn Woolsey	Jim Judd
Party	Democratic	Republican
Popular vote	172,216	77,361
Percentage	66.0%	29.7%
- County results Woolsey: 60–70%
U.S. Representative before election
Lynn Woolsey
Democratic
Elected U.S. Representative
Lynn Woolsey
Democratic

California's 6th congressional district (map) has been represented by Democrat Lynn Woolsey of Petaluma since January 3, 1993.

- Race ranking and details from CQ Politics
- Campaign contributions from OpenSecrets
- Race profile at The New York Times

=== Predictions ===
Source	Ranking	As of
The Cook Political Report	Safe D	November 1, 2010
Rothenberg	Safe D	November 1, 2010
Sabato's Crystal Ball	Safe D	November 1, 2010
RCP	Safe D	November 1, 2010
CQ Politics	Safe D	October 28, 2010
New York Times	Safe D	November 1, 2010
FiveThirtyEight	Safe D	November 1, 2010

California's 6th congressional district election, 2010
Party	Candidate	Votes	%
Democratic	Lynn Woolsey (incumbent)	172,216	66.0
Republican	Jim Judd	77,361	29.7
Peace and Freedom	Eugene E. Ruyle	5,915	2.2
Libertarian	Joel Smolen	5,660	2.1
Total votes		261,152	100.0
Democratic hold			

== District 7 ==
2010 California's 7th congressional district election
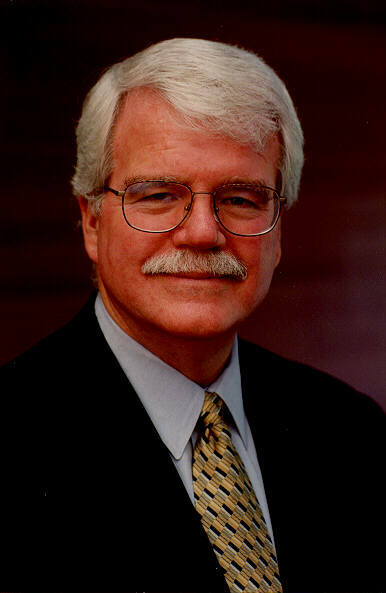

Nominee	George Miller	Rick Tubbs
Party	Democratic	Republican
Popular vote	122,435	56,764
Percentage	68.4%	31.6%
- County results Miller: 50–60% 70–80%
U.S. Representative before election
George Miller
Democratic
Elected U.S. Representative
George Miller
Democratic

California's 7th congressional district (map) has been represented by Democrat George Miller of Martinez since January 3, 1975.

- Race ranking and details from CQ Politics
- Campaign contributions from OpenSecrets
- Race profile at The New York Times

=== Predictions ===
Source	Ranking	As of
The Cook Political Report	Safe D	November 1, 2010
Rothenberg	Safe D	November 1, 2010
Sabato's Crystal Ball	Safe D	November 1, 2010
RCP	Safe D	November 1, 2010
CQ Politics	Safe D	October 28, 2010
New York Times	Safe D	November 1, 2010
FiveThirtyEight	Safe D	November 1, 2010

California's 7th congressional district election, 2010
Party	Candidate	Votes	%
Democratic	George Miller (incumbent)	122,435	68.4
Republican	Rick Tubbs	56,764	31.6
Total votes		179,199	100.0
Democratic hold			

== District 8 ==
2010 California's 8th congressional district election
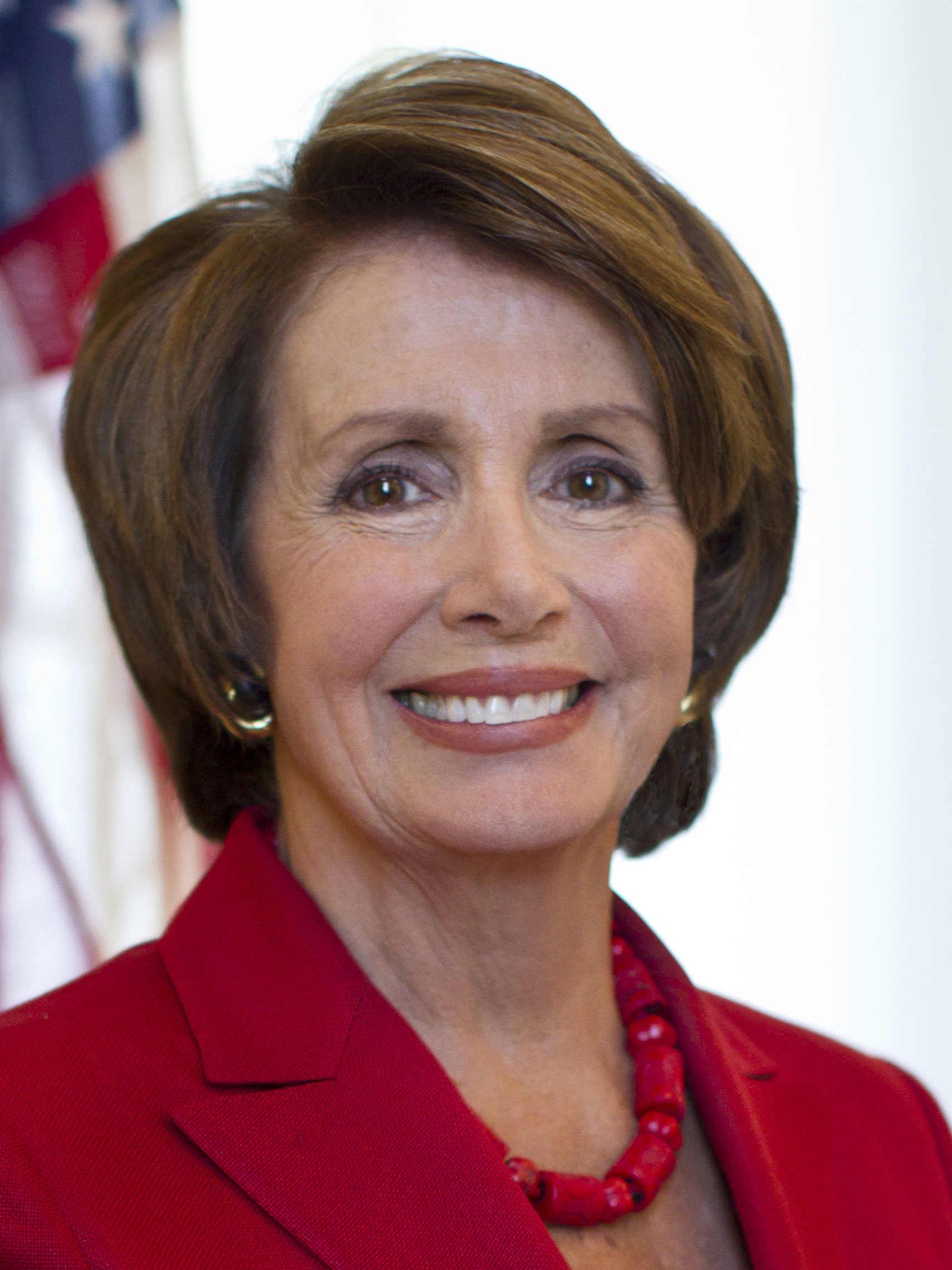

Nominee	Nancy Pelosi	John Dennis
Party	Democratic	Republican
Popular vote	167,957	31,711
Percentage	80.1%	15.2%
- County results Pelosi: 80–90%
U.S. Representative before election
Nancy Pelosi
Democratic
Elected U.S. Representative
Nancy Pelosi
Democratic

California's 8th congressional district (map) has been represented by Democrat Nancy Pelosi of San Francisco since January 3, 1993, when she was redistricted from the 5th district.

- Race ranking and details from CQ Politics
- Campaign contributions from OpenSecrets
- Race profile at The New York Times

=== Predictions ===
Source	Ranking	As of
The Cook Political Report	Safe D	November 1, 2010
Rothenberg	Safe D	November 1, 2010
Sabato's Crystal Ball	Safe D	November 1, 2010
RCP	Safe D	November 1, 2010
CQ Politics	Safe D	October 28, 2010
New York Times	Safe D	November 1, 2010
FiveThirtyEight	Safe D	November 1, 2010

California's 8th congressional district election, 2010
Party	Candidate	Votes	%
Democratic	Nancy Pelosi (incumbent)	167,957	80.1
Republican	John Dennis	31,711	15.2
Peace and Freedom	Gloria E. La Riva	5,161	2.5
Libertarian	Philip Berg	4,843	2.3
Independent	Summer Shields (write-in)	24	0.0
Total votes		209,696	100.0
Democratic hold			

== District 9 ==
2010 California's 9th congressional district election
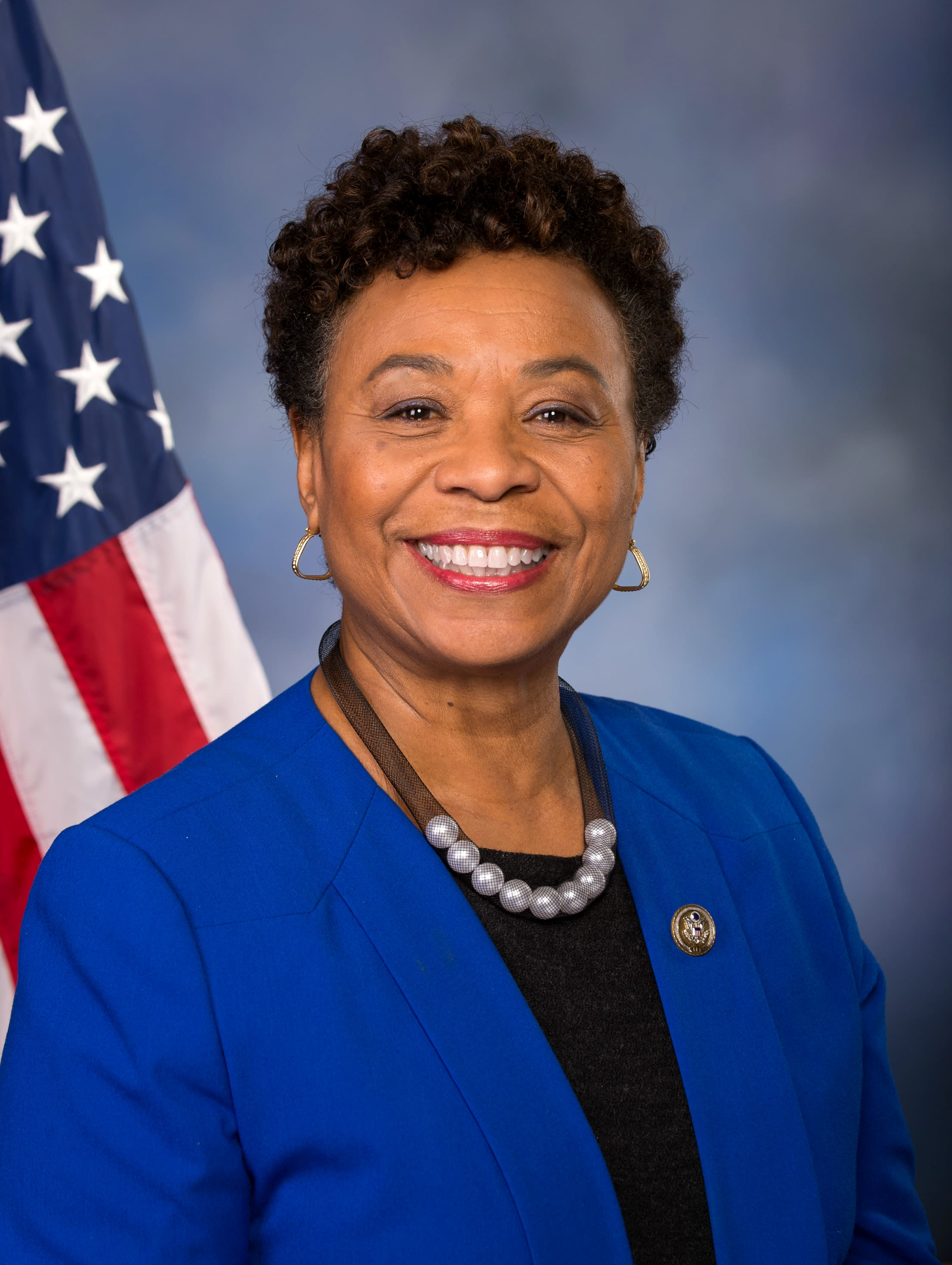

Nominee	Barbara Lee	Gerald Hashimoto
Party	Democratic	Republican
Popular vote	180,400	23,054
Percentage	84.3%	10.8%
- County results Lee: 80–90%
U.S. Representative before election
Barbara Lee
Democratic
Elected U.S. Representative
Barbara Lee
Democratic

California's 9th congressional district (map) has been represented by Democrat Barbara Lee of Oakland since April 7, 1998.

- Race ranking and details from CQ Politics
- Campaign contributions from OpenSecrets
- Race profile at The New York Times

=== Predictions ===
Source	Ranking	As of
The Cook Political Report	Safe D	November 1, 2010
Rothenberg	Safe D	November 1, 2010
Sabato's Crystal Ball	Safe D	November 1, 2010
RCP	Safe D	November 1, 2010
CQ Politics	Safe D	October 28, 2010
New York Times	Safe D	November 1, 2010
FiveThirtyEight	Safe D	November 1, 2010

California's 9th congressional district election, 2010
Party	Candidate	Votes	%
Democratic	Barbara Lee (incumbent)	180,400	84.3
Republican	Gerald Hashimoto	23,054	10.8
Green	Dave Heller	4,848	2.3
Libertarian	James Eyer	4,113	1.9
Peace and Freedom	Larry Allen	1,670	0.8
Total votes		214,085	100.0
Democratic hold			

== District 10 ==
2010 California's 10th congressional district election
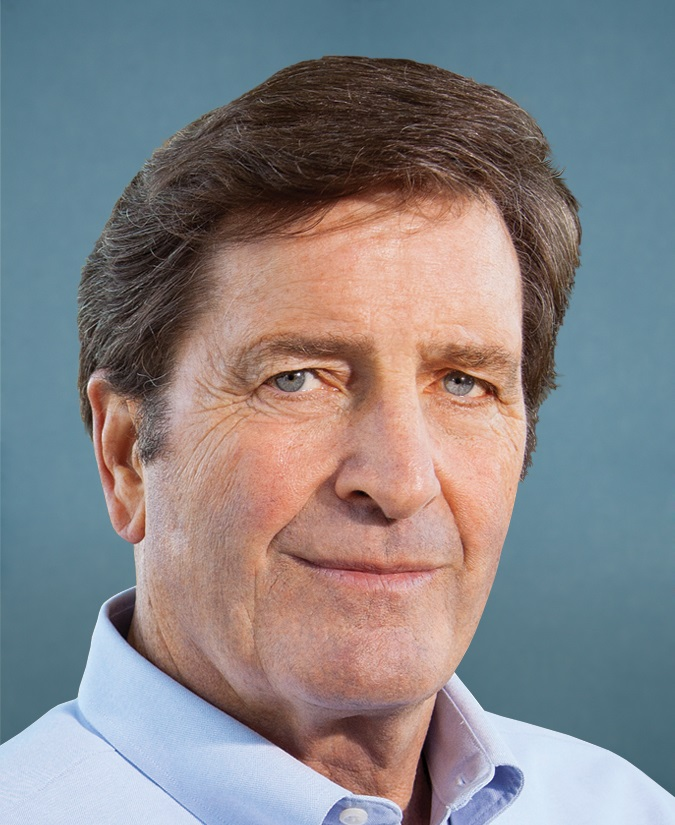

Nominee	John Garamendi	Gary Clift
Party	Democratic	Republican
Popular vote	137,578	88,512
Percentage	58.9%	37.8%
- County results Garamendi: 50–60% 60–70%
U.S. Representative before election
John Garamendi
Democratic
Elected U.S. Representative
John Garamendi
Democratic

California's 10th congressional district (map) has been represented by Democrat John Garamendi of Walnut Grove since November 5, 2009.

- CA - District 10 from OurCampaigns.com
- Race ranking and details from CQ Politics
- Campaign contributions from OpenSecrets
- Race profile at The New York Times

=== Predictions ===
Source	Ranking	As of
The Cook Political Report	Safe D	November 1, 2010
Rothenberg	Safe D	November 1, 2010
Sabato's Crystal Ball	Safe D	November 1, 2010
RCP	Safe D	November 1, 2010
CQ Politics	Safe D	October 28, 2010
New York Times	Safe D	November 1, 2010
FiveThirtyEight	Safe D	November 1, 2010

California's 10th congressional district election, 2010
Party	Candidate	Votes	%
Democratic	John Garamendi (incumbent)	137,578	58.9
Republican	Gary Clift	88,512	37.8
Green	Jeremy Cloward	7,716	3.3
Total votes		233,806	100.0
Democratic hold			

== District 11 ==
2010 California's 11th congressional district election
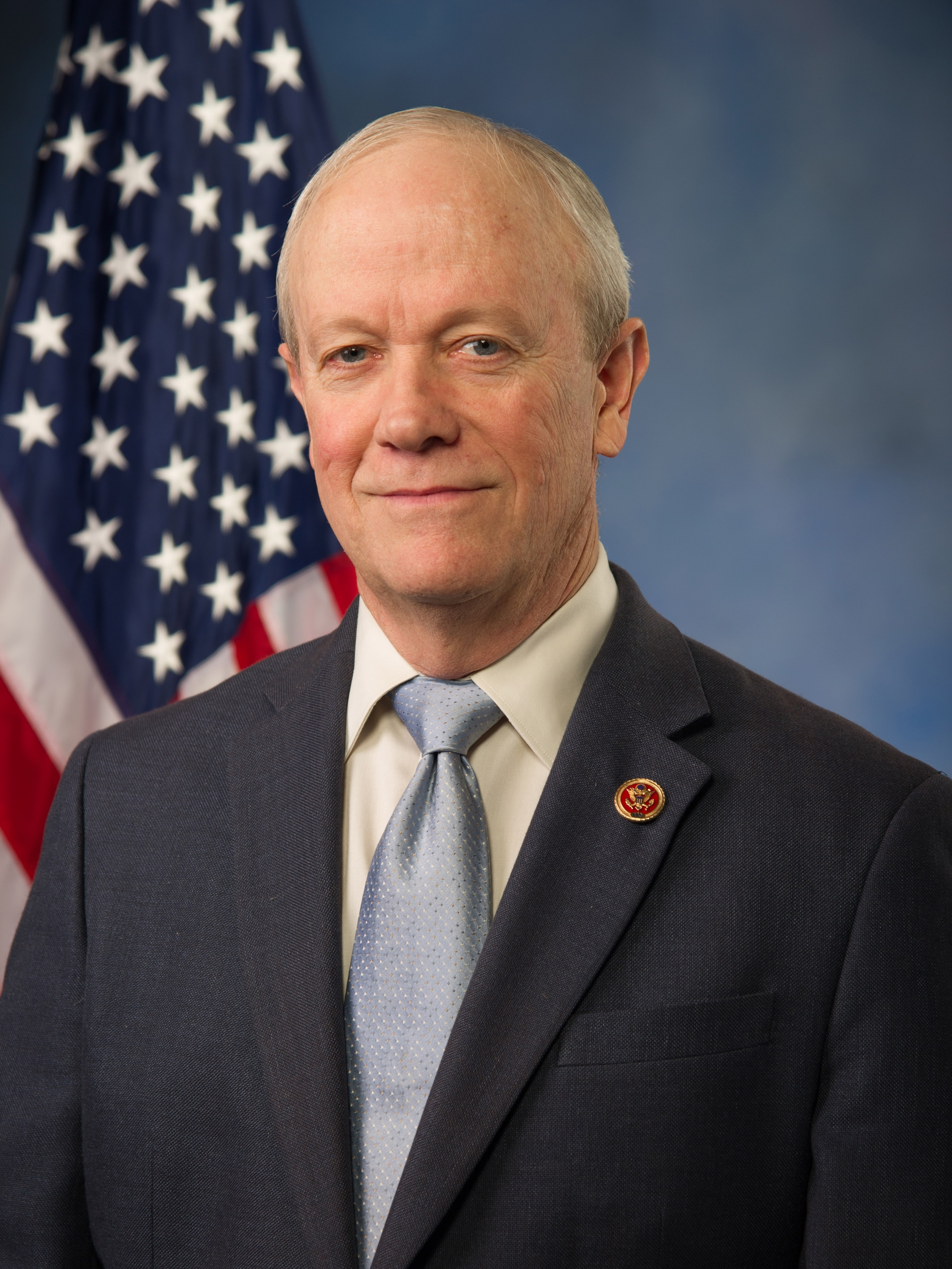

Nominee	Jerry McNerney	David Harmer	David Christensen
Party	Democratic	Republican	American Independent
Popular vote	115,361	112,703	12,439
Percentage	48.0%	46.9%	5.1%
- County results Mcnerney: 40–50% 50–60% Harmer: 40–50%
U.S. Representative before election
Jerry McNerney
Democratic
Elected U.S. Representative
Jerry McNerney
Democratic

California's 11th congressional district (map) has been represented by Democrat Jerry McNerney of Pleasanton since January 3, 2007.

- Race ranking and details from CQ Politics
- Campaign contributions from OpenSecrets
- Race profile at The New York Times

=== Predictions ===
Source	Ranking	As of
The Cook Political Report	Tossup	November 1, 2010
Rothenberg	Tossup	November 1, 2010
Sabato's Crystal Ball	Lean R (flip)	November 1, 2010
RCP	Lean R (flip)	November 1, 2010
CQ Politics	Tossup	October 28, 2010
New York Times	Tossup	November 1, 2010
FiveThirtyEight	Lean R (flip)	November 1, 2010

California's 11th congressional district election, 2010
Party	Candidate	Votes	%
Democratic	Jerry McNerney (incumbent)	115,361	48.0
Republican	David Harmer	112,703	46.9
American Independent	David Christensen	12,439	5.1
Total votes		240,503	100.0
Democratic hold			

== District 12 ==
2010 California's 12th congressional district election
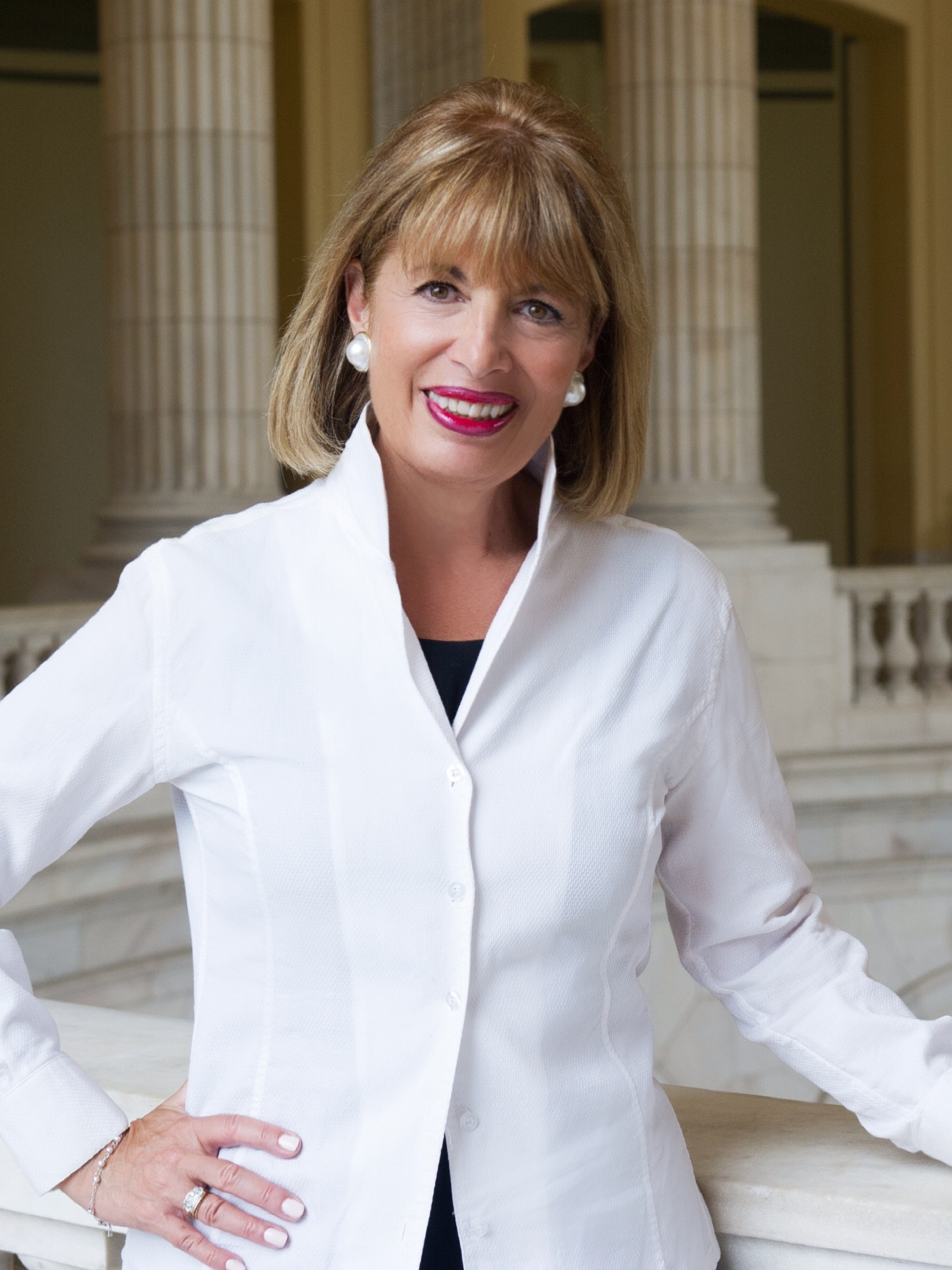

Nominee	Jackie Speier	Mike Maloney
Party	Democratic	Republican
Popular vote	152,044	44,475
Percentage	75.6%	22.2%
- County results Speier: 70–80%
U.S. Representative before election
Jackie Speier
Democratic
Elected U.S. Representative
Jackie Speier
Democratic

California's 12th congressional district (map) has been represented by Democrat Jackie Speier of Hillsborough since April 10, 2008.

- Race ranking and details from CQ Politics
- Campaign contributions from OpenSecrets
- Race profile at The New York Times

=== Predictions ===
Source	Ranking	As of
The Cook Political Report	Safe D	November 1, 2010
Rothenberg	Safe D	November 1, 2010
Sabato's Crystal Ball	Safe D	November 1, 2010
RCP	Safe D	November 1, 2010
CQ Politics	Safe D	October 28, 2010
New York Times	Safe D	November 1, 2010
FiveThirtyEight	Safe D	November 1, 2010

California's 12th congressional district election, 2010
Party	Candidate	Votes	%
Democratic	Jackie Speier (incumbent)	152,044	75.6
Republican	Mike Maloney	44,475	22.2
Libertarian	Mark Paul Williams	4,611	2.2
Independent	Joseph Michael Harding (write-in)	32	0.0
Total votes		201,162	100.0
Democratic hold			

== District 13 ==
2010 California's 13th congressional district election
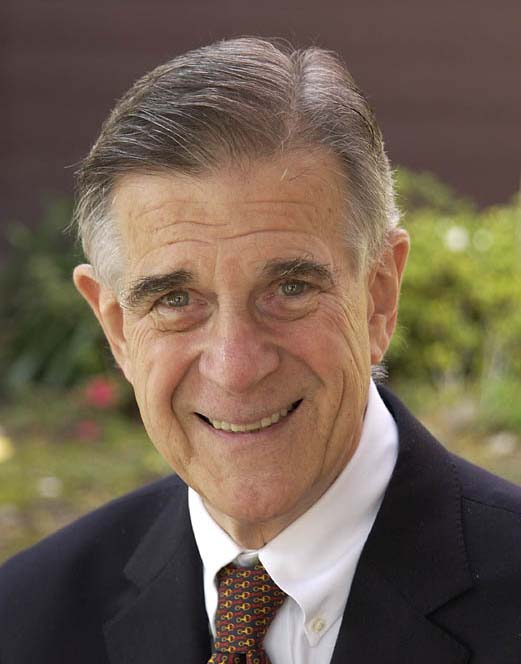

Nominee	Pete Stark	Forest Baker
Party	Democratic	Republican
Popular vote	118,278	45,575
Percentage	72.0%	27.7%
- County results Stark: 70–80%
U.S. Representative before election
Pete Stark
Democratic
Elected U.S. Representative
Pete Stark
Democratic

California's 13th congressional district (map) has been represented by Democrat Pete Stark of Fremont since January 3, 1993, when he was redistricted from the 9th district.

- Race ranking and details from CQ Politics
- Campaign contributions from OpenSecrets
- Race profile at The New York Times

=== Predictions ===
Source	Ranking	As of
The Cook Political Report	Safe D	November 1, 2010
Rothenberg	Safe D	November 1, 2010
Sabato's Crystal Ball	Safe D	November 1, 2010
RCP	Safe D	November 1, 2010
CQ Politics	Safe D	October 28, 2010
New York Times	Safe D	November 1, 2010
FiveThirtyEight	Safe D	November 1, 2010

California's 13th congressional district election, 2010
Party	Candidate	Votes	%
Democratic	Pete Stark (incumbent)	118,278	72.0
Republican	Forest Baker	45,575	27.7
Independent	Chris Pareja (write-in)	525	0.3
Total votes		164,378	100.0
Democratic hold			

== District 14 ==
2010 California's 14th congressional district election
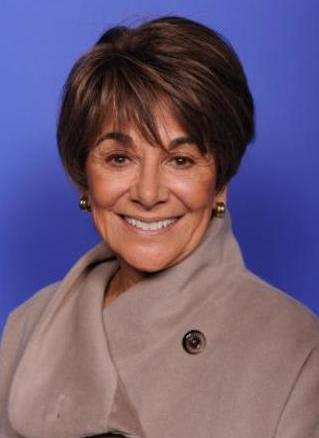

Nominee	Anna Eshoo	Dave Chapman
Party	Democratic	Republican
Popular vote	151,217	60,917
Percentage	69.1%	27.9%
- County results Eshoo: 60–70% 70–80%
U.S. Representative before election
Anna Eshoo
Democratic
Elected U.S. Representative
Anna Eshoo
Democratic

California's 14th congressional district (map) has been represented by Democrat Anna Eshoo of Atherton since January 3, 1993.

- Race ranking and details from CQ Politics
- Campaign contributions from OpenSecrets
- Race profile at The New York Times

=== Predictions ===
Source	Ranking	As of
The Cook Political Report	Safe D	November 1, 2010
Rothenberg	Safe D	November 1, 2010
Sabato's Crystal Ball	Safe D	November 1, 2010
RCP	Safe D	November 1, 2010
CQ Politics	Safe D	October 28, 2010
New York Times	Safe D	November 1, 2010
FiveThirtyEight	Safe D	November 1, 2010

California's 14th congressional district election, 2010
Party	Candidate	Votes	%
Democratic	Anna Eshoo (incumbent)	151,217	69.1
Republican	Dave Chapman	60,917	27.9
Libertarian	Paul Lazaga	6,735	3.0
Total votes		218,869	100.0
Democratic hold			

== District 15 ==
2010 California's 15th congressional district election
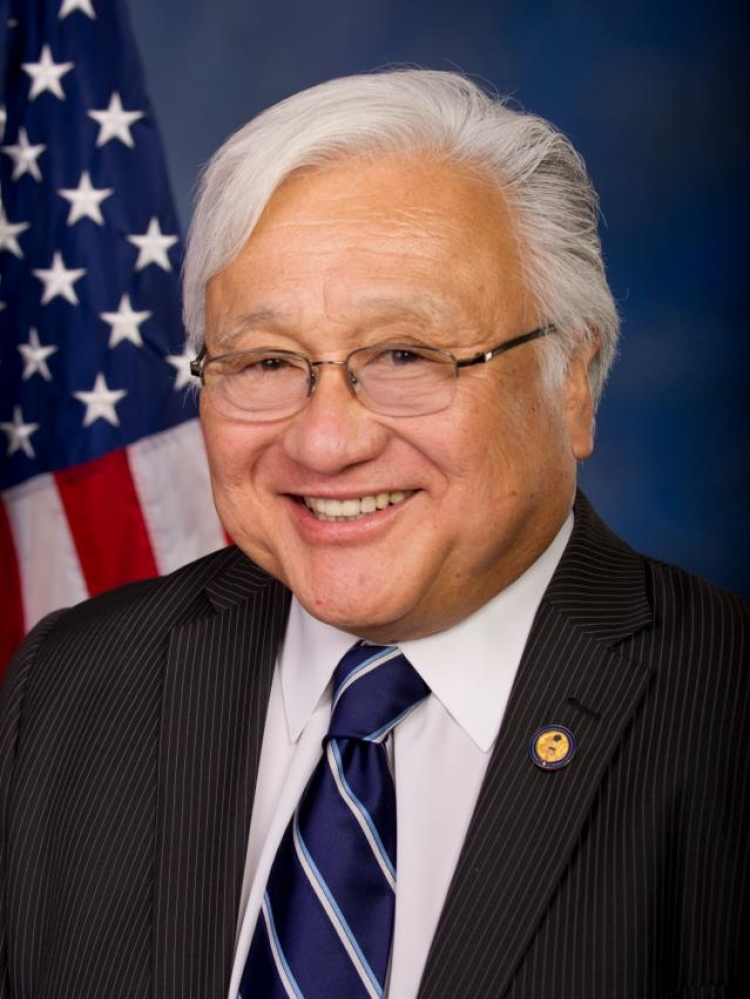

Nominee	Mike Honda	Scott Kirkland
Party	Democratic	Republican
Popular vote	126,147	60,468
Percentage	67.6%	32.4%
- County results Honda: 60–70%
U.S. Representative before election
Mike Honda
Democratic
Elected U.S. Representative
Mike Honda
Democratic

California's 15th congressional district (map) has been represented by Democrat Mike Honda of San Jose since January 3, 2001.

- Race ranking and details from CQ Politics
- Campaign contributions from OpenSecrets
- Race profile at The New York Times

=== Predictions ===
Source	Ranking	As of
The Cook Political Report	Safe D	November 1, 2010
Rothenberg	Safe D	November 1, 2010
Sabato's Crystal Ball	Safe D	November 1, 2010
RCP	Safe D	November 1, 2010
CQ Politics	Safe D	October 28, 2010
New York Times	Safe D	November 1, 2010
FiveThirtyEight	Safe D	November 1, 2010

California's 15th congressional district election, 2010
Party	Candidate	Votes	%
Democratic	Mike Honda (incumbent)	126,147	67.6
Republican	Scott Kirkland	60,468	32.4
Total votes		186,615	100.0
Democratic hold			

== District 16 ==
2010 California's 16th congressional district election
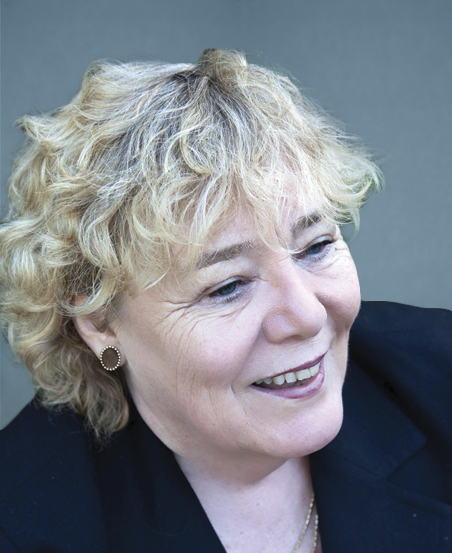

Nominee	Zoe Lofgren	Daniel Sahagun	Edward M. Gonzalez
Party	Democratic	Republican	Libertarian
Popular vote	105,841	37,913	12,304
Percentage	67.9%	24.3%	7.8%
- County results Lofgren: 60–70%
U.S. Representative before election
Zoe Lofgren
Democratic
Elected U.S. Representative
Zoe Lofgren
Democratic

California's 16th congressional district (map) has been represented by Democrat Zoe Lofgren of San Jose since January 3, 1993.

- Race ranking and details from CQ Politics
- Campaign contributions from OpenSecrets
- Race profile at The New York Times

=== Predictions ===
Source	Ranking	As of
The Cook Political Report	Safe D	November 1, 2010
Rothenberg	Safe D	November 1, 2010
Sabato's Crystal Ball	Safe D	November 1, 2010
RCP	Safe D	November 1, 2010
CQ Politics	Safe D	October 28, 2010
New York Times	Safe D	November 1, 2010
FiveThirtyEight	Safe D	November 1, 2010

California's 16th congressional district election, 2010
Party	Candidate	Votes	%
Democratic	Zoe Lofgren (incumbent)	105,841	67.9
Republican	Daniel Sahagun	37,913	24.3
Libertarian	Edward M. Gonzalez	12,304	7.8
Total votes		156,058	100.0
Democratic hold			

== District 17 ==
2010 California's 17th congressional district election
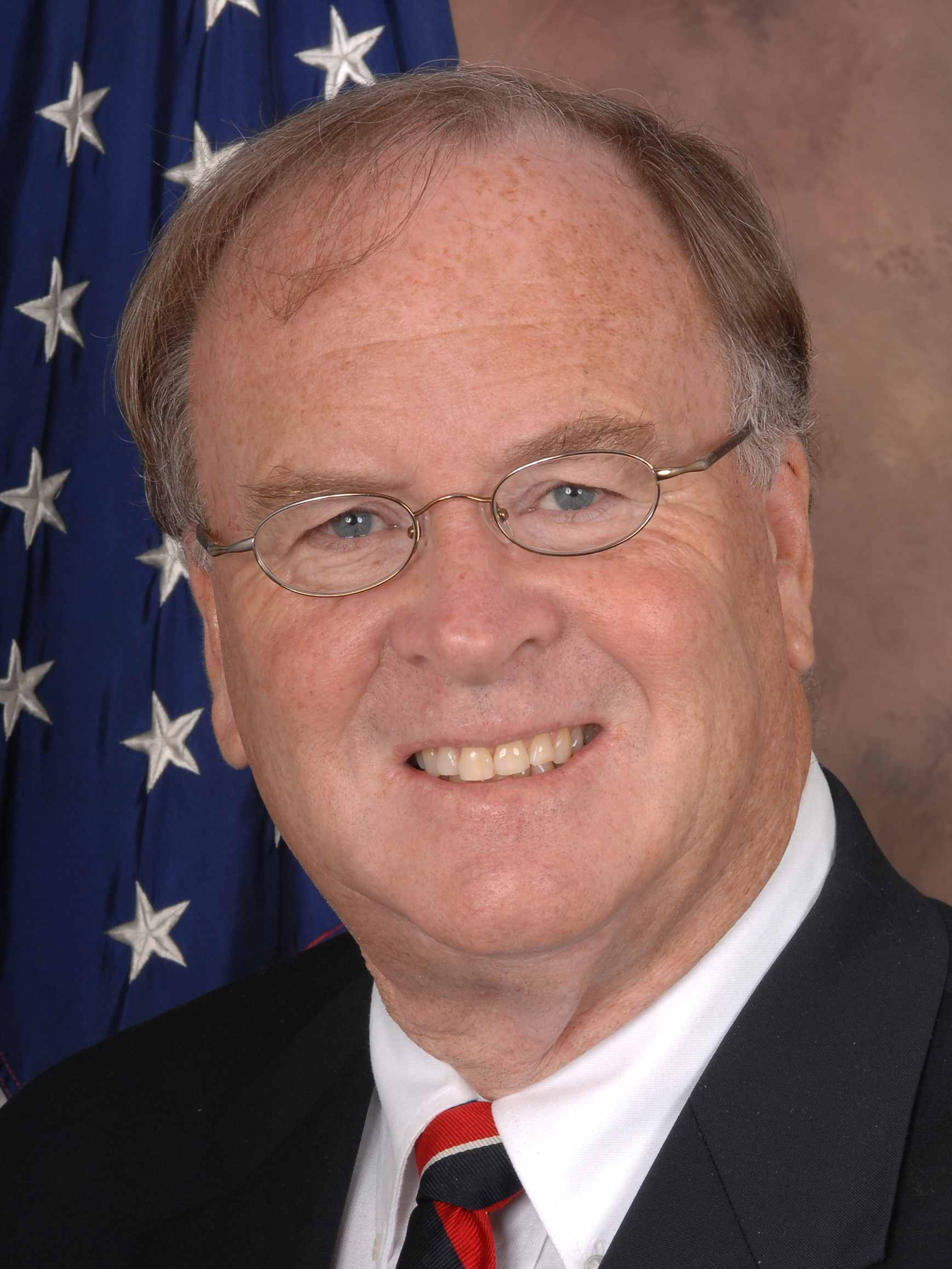

Nominee	Sam Farr	Jeff Taylor
Party	Democratic	Republican
Popular vote	118,734	53,176
Percentage	66.7%	29.9%
- County results Farr: 50–60% 60–70% 70–80%
U.S. Representative before election
Sam Farr
Democratic
Elected U.S. Representative
Sam Farr
Democratic

California's 17th congressional district (map) has been represented by Democrat Sam Farr of Carmel-by-the-Sea since June 8, 1993.

- Race ranking and details from CQ Politics
- Campaign contributions from OpenSecrets
- Race profile at The New York Times

=== Predictions ===
Source	Ranking	As of
The Cook Political Report	Safe D	November 1, 2010
Rothenberg	Safe D	November 1, 2010
Sabato's Crystal Ball	Safe D	November 1, 2010
RCP	Safe D	November 1, 2010
CQ Politics	Safe D	October 28, 2010
New York Times	Safe D	November 1, 2010
FiveThirtyEight	Safe D	November 1, 2010

California's 17th congressional district election, 2010
Party	Candidate	Votes	%
Democratic	Sam Farr (incumbent)	118,734	66.7
Republican	Jeff Taylor	53,176	29.9
Green	Eric Petersen	3,397	1.9
Libertarian	Mary V. Larkin	2,742	1.5
Independent	Ronald P. Kabat (write-in)	90	0.0
Total votes		178,139	100.0
Democratic hold			

== District 18 ==
2010 California's 18th congressional district election
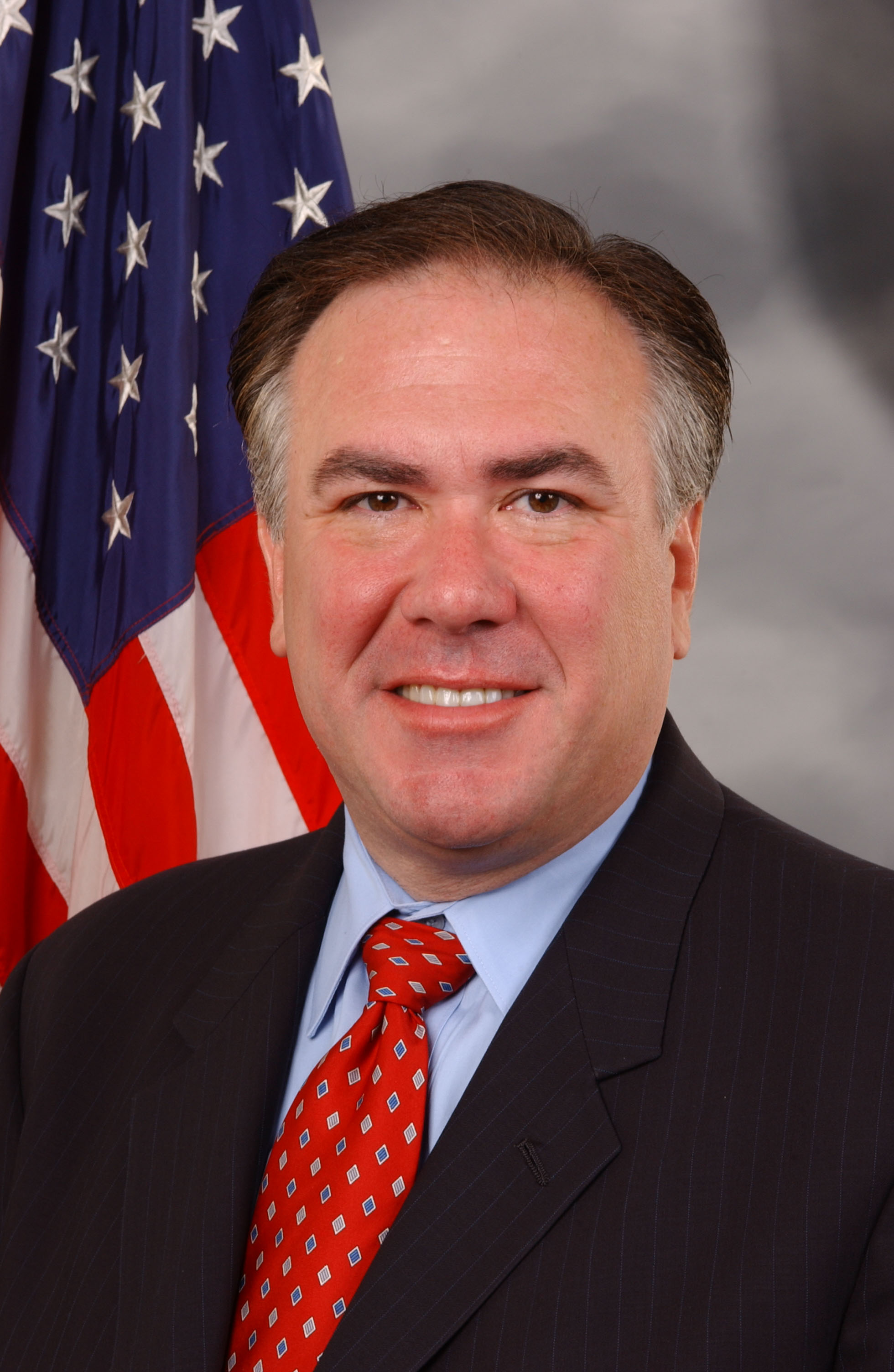

Nominee	Dennis Cardoza	Mike Berryhill
Party	Democratic	Republican
Popular vote	72,853	51,716
Percentage	58.5%	41.5%
- County results Michael Clare Berryhill: 60–70% 70–80% Cardoza: 50–60% 70–80%
U.S. Representative before election
Dennis Cardoza
Democratic
Elected U.S. Representative
Dennis Cardoza
Democratic

California's 18th congressional district (map) has been represented by Democrat Dennis Cardoza of Atwater since January 3, 2003.

- Race ranking and details from CQ Politics
- Campaign contributions from OpenSecrets
- Race profile at The New York Times

=== Predictions ===
Source	Ranking	As of
The Cook Political Report	Likely D	November 1, 2010
Rothenberg	Safe D	November 1, 2010
Sabato's Crystal Ball	Likely D	November 1, 2010
RCP	Lean D	November 1, 2010
CQ Politics	Safe D	October 28, 2010
New York Times	Lean D	November 1, 2010
FiveThirtyEight	Safe D	November 1, 2010

California's 18th congressional district election, 2010
Party	Candidate	Votes	%
Democratic	Dennis Cardoza (incumbent)	72,853	58.5
Republican	Mike Berryhill	51,716	41.5
Total votes		124,569	100.0
Democratic hold			

== District 19 ==
2010 California's 19th congressional district election
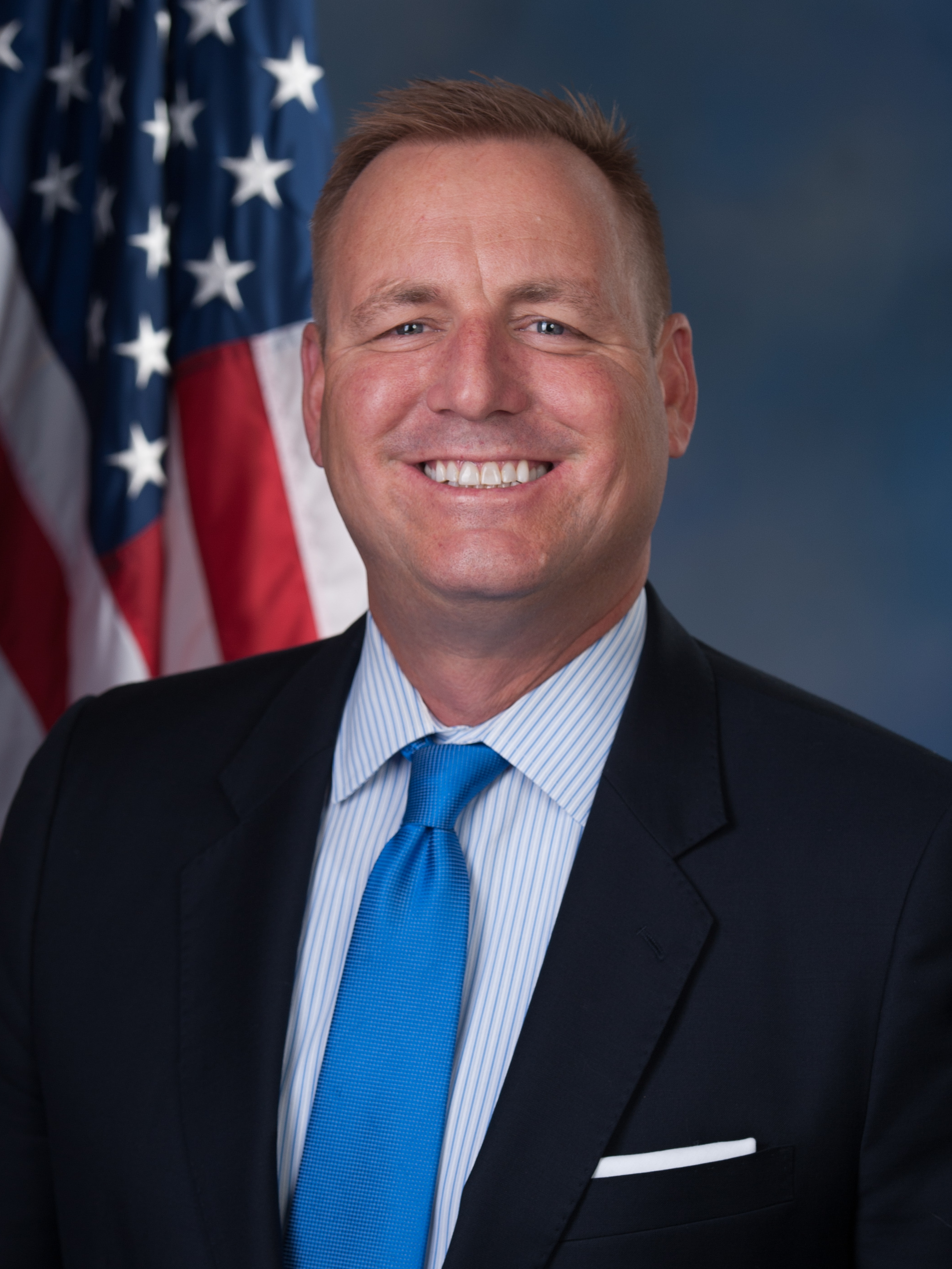

Nominee	Jeff Denham	Loraine Goodwin
Party	Republican	Democratic
Popular vote	128,394	69,912
Percentage	64.6%	35.2%
- County results Denham: 60–70%
U.S. Representative before election
George Radanovich
Republican
Elected U.S. Representative
Jeff Denham
Republican

California's 19th congressional district (map) has been represented by Republican George Radanovich of Mariposa since January 3, 1995. Radanovich did not run for reelection.

- Race ranking and details from CQ Politics
- Campaign contributions from OpenSecrets
- Race profile at The New York Times

=== Predictions ===
Source	Ranking	As of
The Cook Political Report	Safe R	November 1, 2010
Rothenberg	Safe R	November 1, 2010
Sabato's Crystal Ball	Safe R	November 1, 2010
RCP	Safe R	November 1, 2010
CQ Politics	Safe R	October 28, 2010
New York Times	Safe R	November 1, 2010
FiveThirtyEight	Safe R	November 1, 2010

California's 19th congressional district election, 2010
Party	Candidate	Votes	%
Republican	Jeff Denham	128,394	64.6
Democratic	Loraine Goodwin	69,912	35.2
Democratic	Les Marsden (write-in)	596	0.2
Total votes		198,902	100.0
Republican hold			

== District 20 ==
2010 California's 20th congressional district election
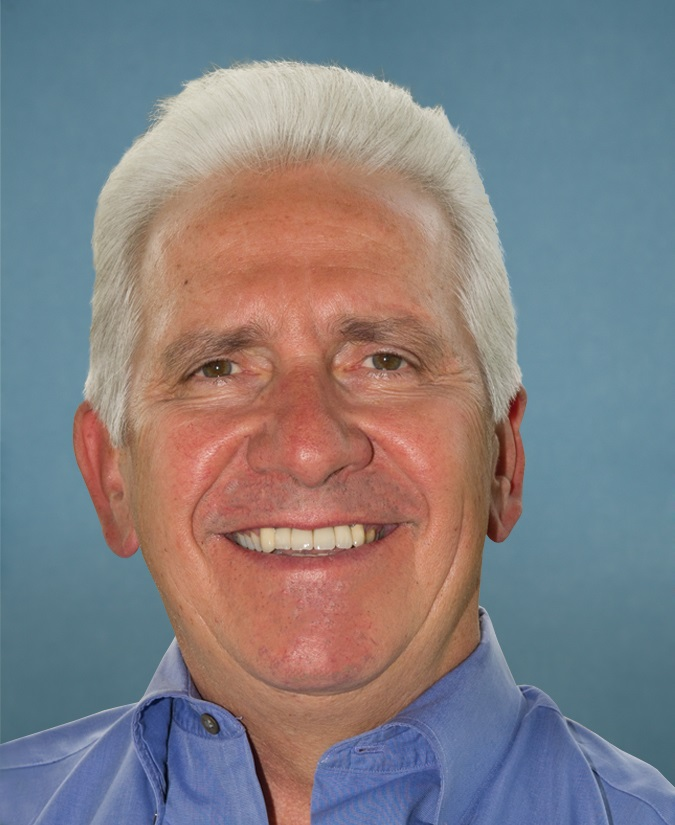

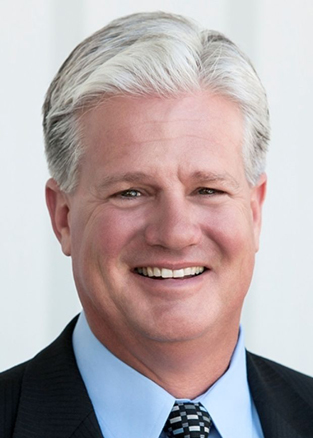
Nominee	Jim Costa	Andy Vidak
Party	Democratic	Republican
Popular vote	46,247	43,197
Percentage	51.8%	48.2%
- County results Costa: 60–70% Vidak: 60–70%
U.S. Representative before election
Jim Costa
Democratic
Elected U.S. Representative
Jim Costa
Democratic

California's 20th congressional district (map) has been represented by Democrat Jim Costa of Fresno since January 3, 2005.

- Race ranking and details from CQ Politics
- Campaign contributions from OpenSecrets
- Race profile at The New York Times

=== Predictions ===
Source	Ranking	As of
The Cook Political Report	Tossup	November 1, 2010
Rothenberg	Lean D	November 1, 2010
Sabato's Crystal Ball	Lean D	November 1, 2010
RCP	Lean R (flip)	November 1, 2010
CQ Politics	Lean D	October 28, 2010
New York Times	Lean D	November 1, 2010
FiveThirtyEight	Tossup	November 1, 2010

California's 20th congressional district election, 2010
Party	Candidate	Votes	%
Democratic	Jim Costa (incumbent)	46,247	51.8
Republican	Andy Vidak	43,197	48.2
Total votes		89,444	100.0
Democratic hold			

== District 21 ==
2010 California's 21st congressional district election
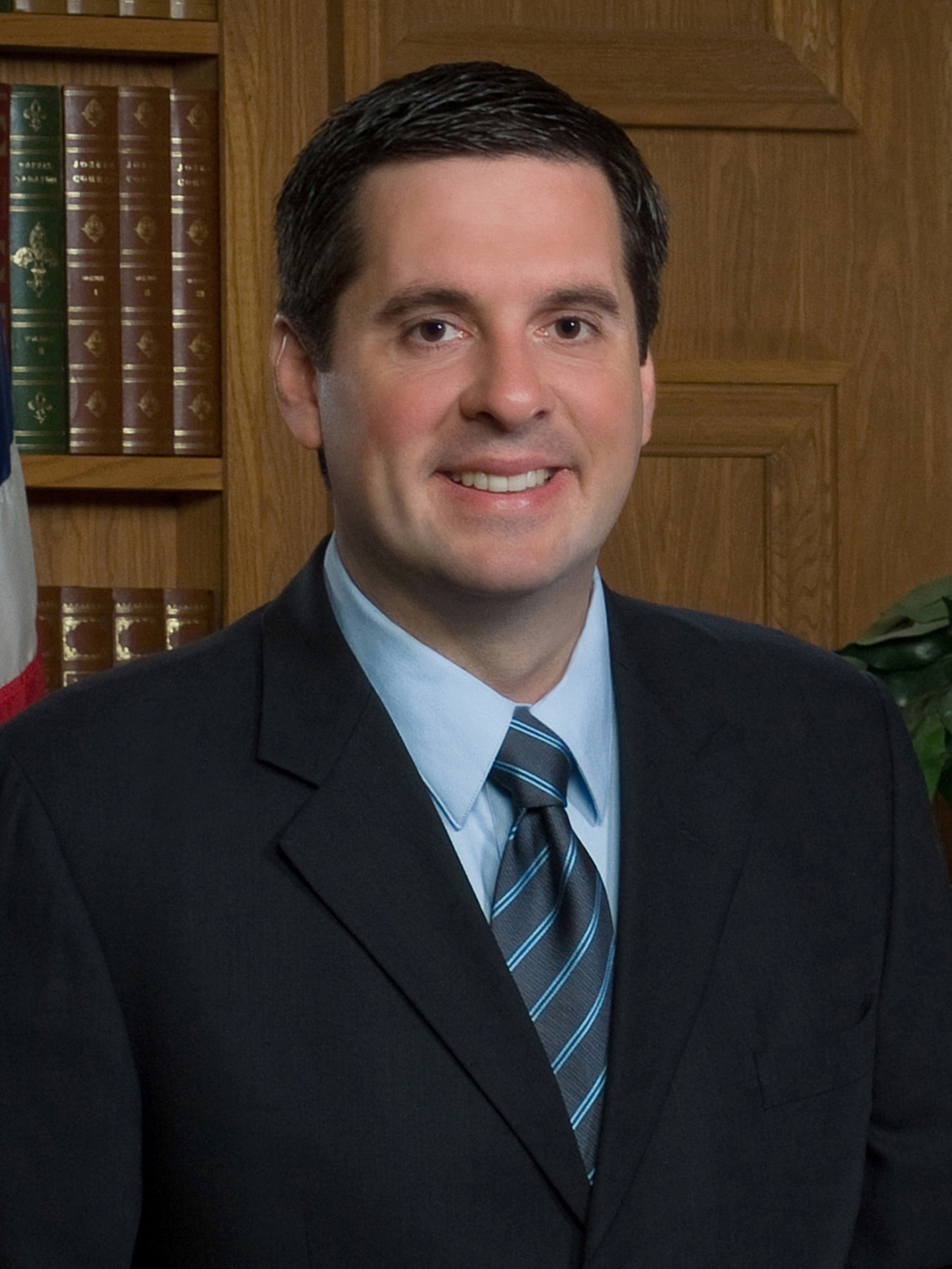
Nominee	Devin Nunes
Party	Republican
Popular vote	135,979
Percentage	100.0%
U.S. Representative before election
Devin Nunes
Republican
Elected U.S. Representative
Devin Nunes
Republican

California's 21st congressional district (map) has been represented by Republican Devin Nunes of Tulare since January 3, 2003.

- Race ranking and details from CQ Politics
- Campaign contributions from OpenSecrets
- Race profile at The New York Times

=== Predictions ===
Source	Ranking	As of
The Cook Political Report	Safe R	November 1, 2010
Rothenberg	Safe R	November 1, 2010
Sabato's Crystal Ball	Safe R	November 1, 2010
RCP	Safe R	November 1, 2010
CQ Politics	Safe R	October 28, 2010
New York Times	Safe R	November 1, 2010
FiveThirtyEight	Safe R	November 1, 2010

California's 21st congressional district election, 2010
Party	Candidate	Votes	%
Republican	Devin Nunes (incumbent)	135,979	100.0
Total votes		135,979	100.0
Republican hold			

== District 22 ==
2010 California's 22nd congressional district election
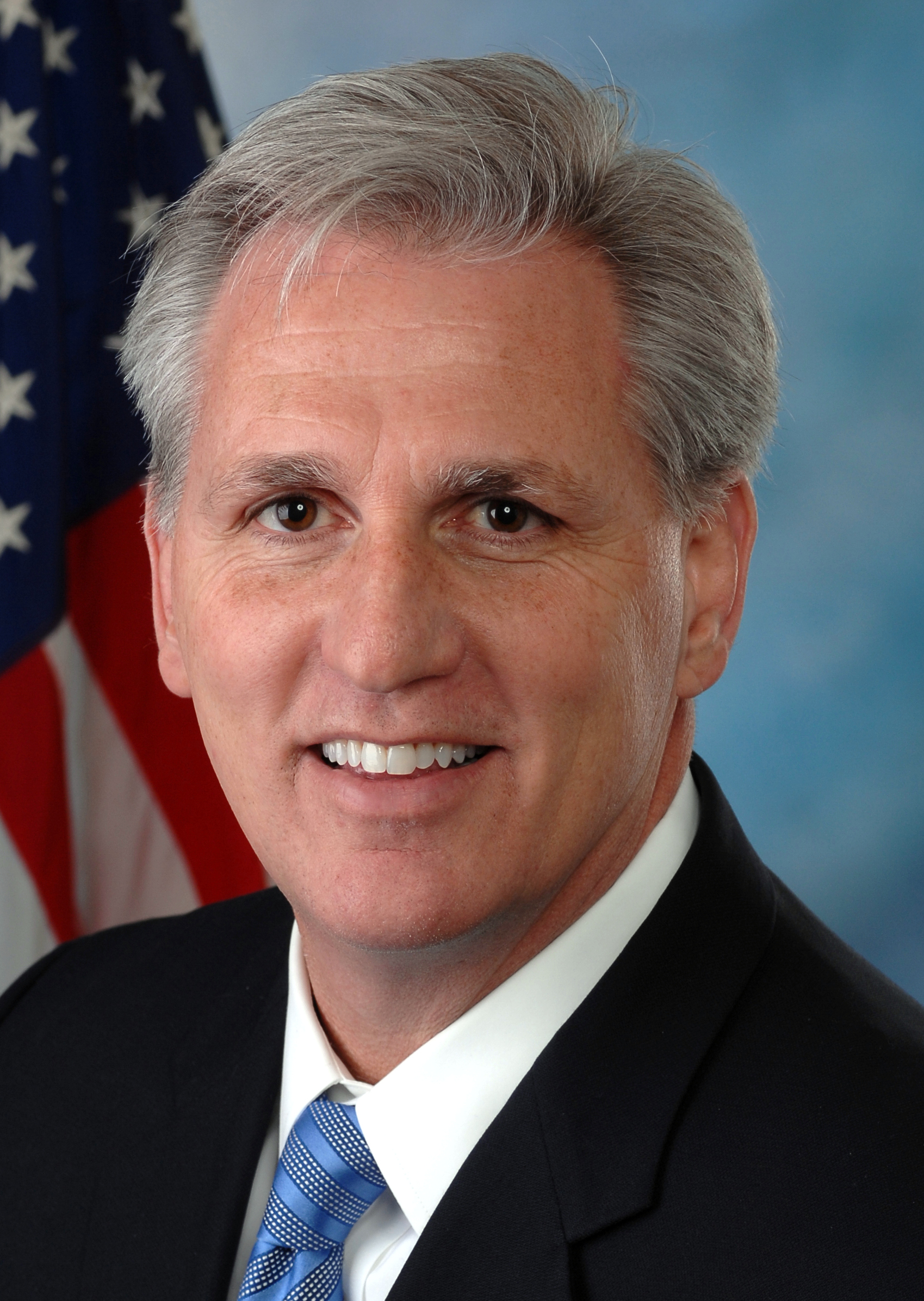
Nominee	Kevin McCarthy
Party	Republican
Popular vote	173,490
Percentage	98.8%
U.S. Representative before election
Kevin McCarthy
Republican
Elected U.S. Representative
Kevin McCarthy
Republican

California's 22nd congressional district (map) has been represented by Republican Kevin McCarthy of Bakersfield since January 3, 2007.

- Race ranking and details from CQ Politics
- Campaign contributions from OpenSecrets
- Race profile at The New York Times

=== Predictions ===
Source	Ranking	As of
The Cook Political Report	Safe R	November 1, 2010
Rothenberg	Safe R	November 1, 2010
Sabato's Crystal Ball	Safe R	November 1, 2010
RCP	Safe R	November 1, 2010
CQ Politics	Safe R	October 28, 2010
New York Times	Safe R	November 1, 2010
FiveThirtyEight	Safe R	November 1, 2010

California's 22nd congressional district election, 2010
Party	Candidate	Votes	%
Republican	Kevin McCarthy (incumbent)	173,490	98.8
Independent	John Uebersax (write-in)	2,173	1.2
Total votes		175,663	100.0
Republican hold			

== District 23 ==
2010 California's 23rd congressional district election
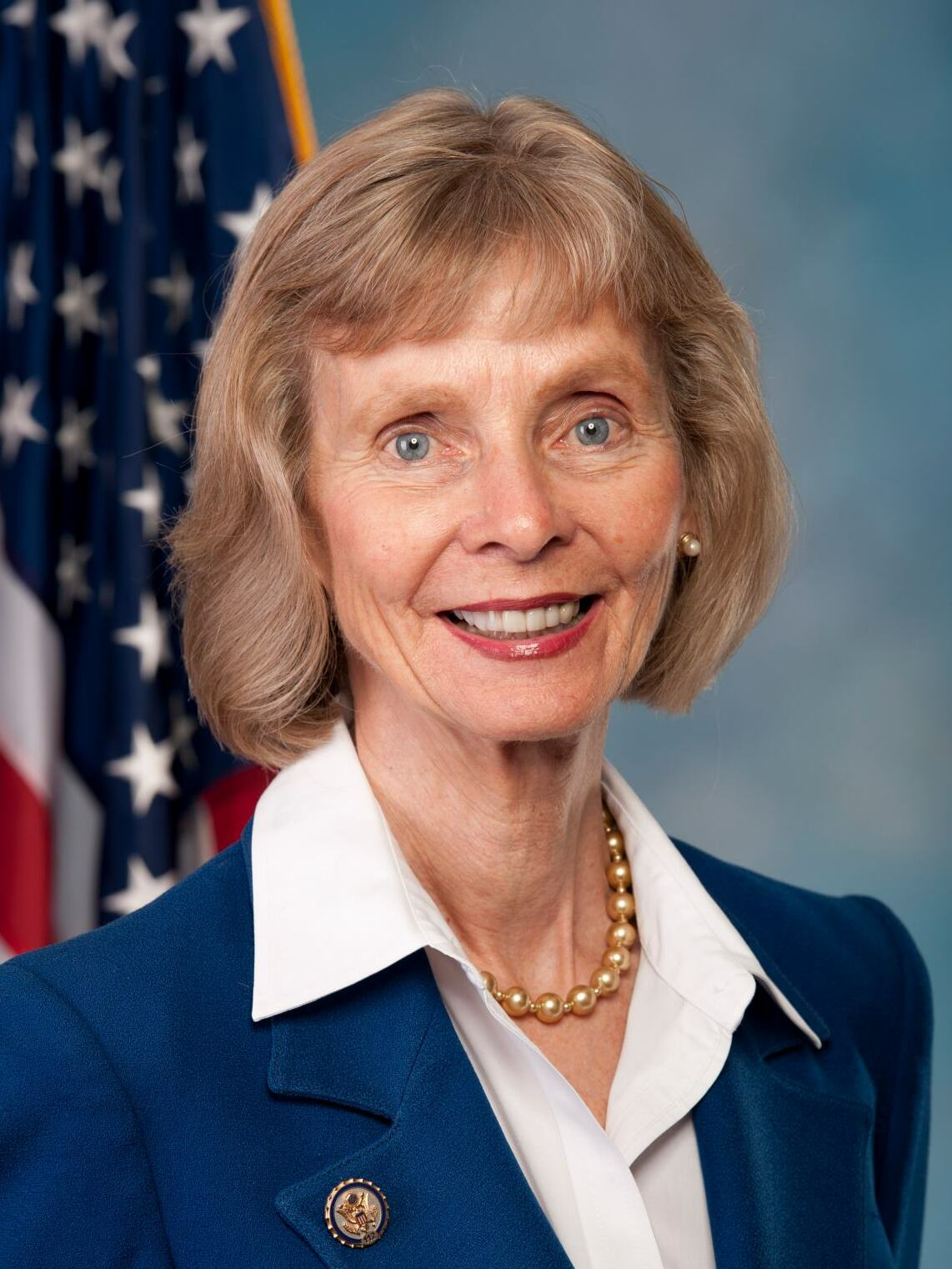

Nominee	Lois Capps	Tom Watson
Party	Democratic	Republican
Popular vote	111,768	72,744
Percentage	57.8%	37.6%
- County results Capps: 50–60% 60–70%
U.S. Representative before election
Lois Capps
Democratic
Elected U.S. Representative
Lois Capps
Democratic

California's 23rd congressional district (map) has been represented by Democrat Lois Capps of Santa Barbara since January 3, 2003, when she was redistricted from the 22nd district.

- Race ranking and details from CQ Politics
- Campaign contributions from OpenSecrets
- Race profile at The New York Times

=== Predictions ===
Source	Ranking	As of
The Cook Political Report	Safe D	November 1, 2010
Rothenberg	Safe D	November 1, 2010
Sabato's Crystal Ball	Safe D	November 1, 2010
RCP	Safe D	November 1, 2010
CQ Politics	Safe D	October 28, 2010
New York Times	Safe D	November 1, 2010
FiveThirtyEight	Safe D	November 1, 2010

California's 23rd congressional district election, 2010
Party	Candidate	Votes	%
Democratic	Lois Capps (incumbent)	111,768	57.8
Republican	Tom Watson	72,744	37.6
Independent	John Victor Hager	5,625	2.9
Libertarian	Darrell M. Stafford	3,326	1.7
Total votes		193,463	100.0
Democratic hold			

== District 24 ==
2010 California's 24th congressional district election
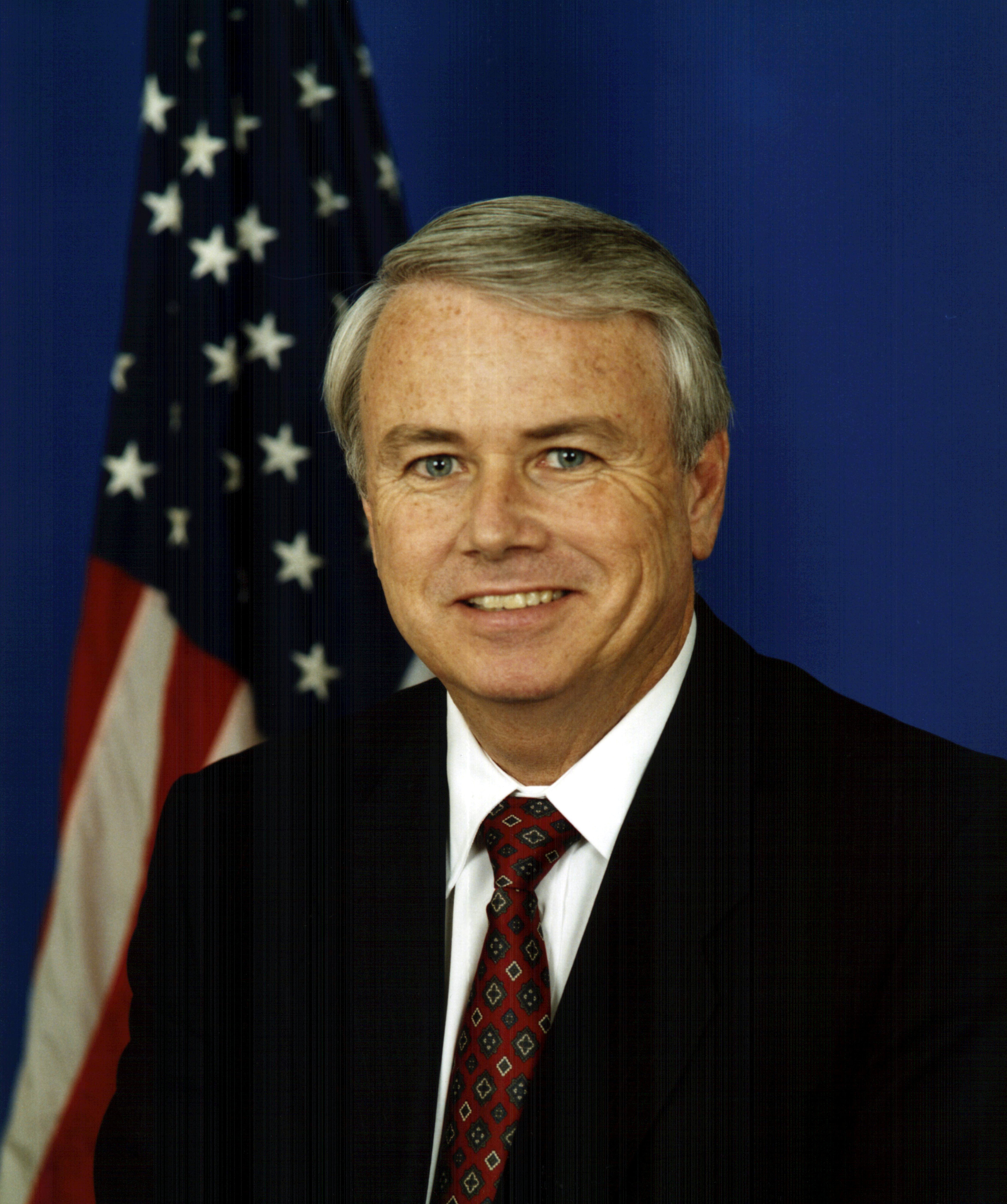

Nominee	Elton Gallegly	Timothy Allison
Party	Republican	Democratic
Popular vote	144,055	96,279
Percentage	60.0%	40.0%
- County results Gallegly: 50–60% 60–70%
U.S. Representative before election
Elton Gallegly
Republican
Elected U.S. Representative
Elton Gallegly
Republican

California's 24th congressional district (map) has been represented by Republican Elton Gallegly of Simi Valley since January 3, 2003, when he was redistricted from the 23rd district.

- Race ranking and details from CQ Politics
- Campaign contributions from OpenSecrets
- Race profile at The New York Times

=== Predictions ===
Source	Ranking	As of
The Cook Political Report	Safe R	November 1, 2010
Rothenberg	Safe R	November 1, 2010
Sabato's Crystal Ball	Safe R	November 1, 2010
RCP	Safe R	November 1, 2010
CQ Politics	Safe R	October 28, 2010
New York Times	Safe R	November 1, 2010
FiveThirtyEight	Safe R	November 1, 2010

California's 24th congressional district election, 2010
Party	Candidate	Votes	%
Republican	Elton Gallegly (incumbent)	144,055	60.0
Democratic	Timothy Allison	96,279	40.0
Total votes		240,334	100.0
Republican hold			

== District 25 ==
2010 California's 25th congressional district election
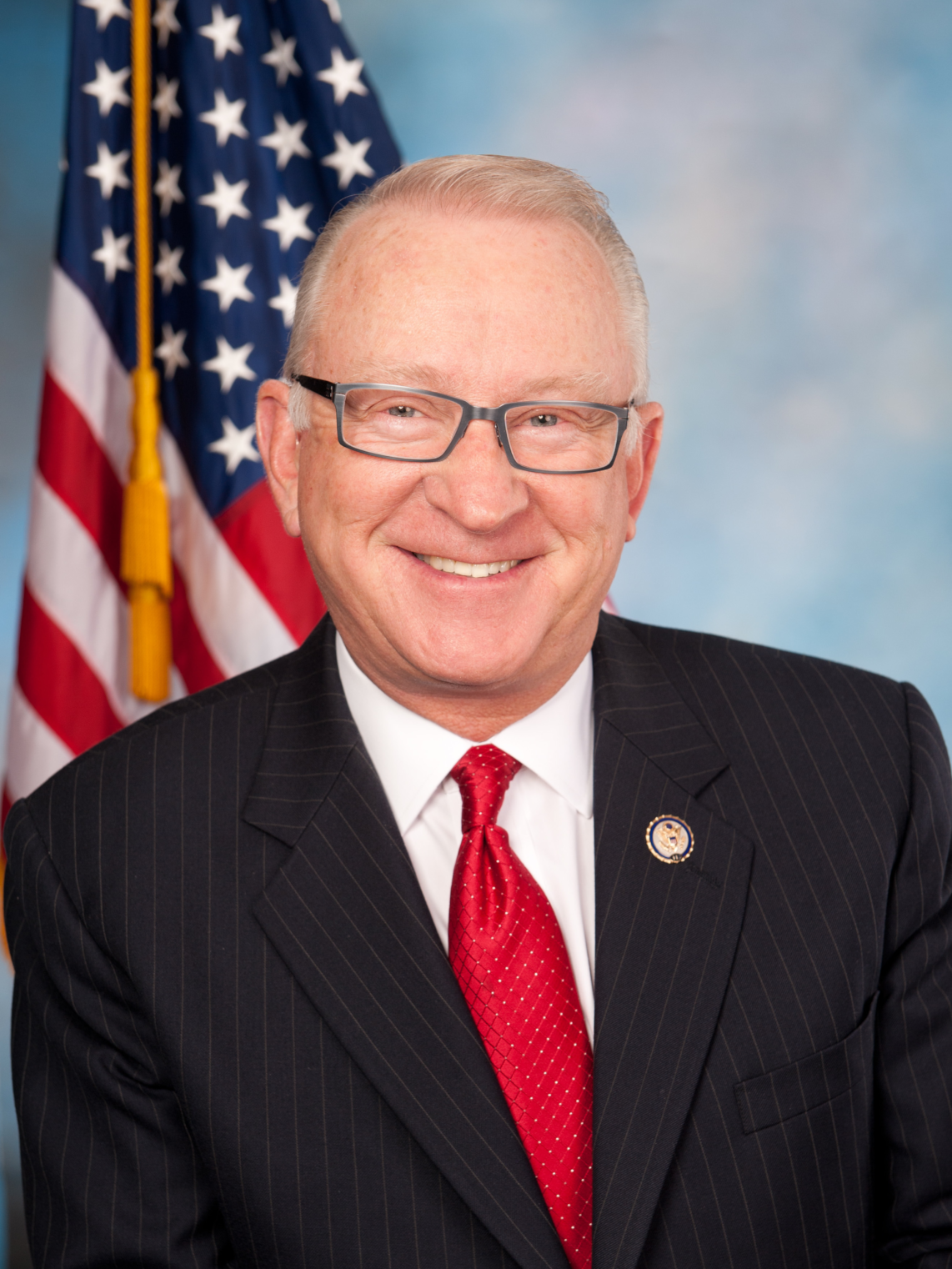

Nominee	Howard McKeon	Jackie Conaway
Party	Republican	Democratic
Popular vote	118,308	73,028
Percentage	61.9%	38.1%
- County results Keon: 50–60% 60–70%
U.S. Representative before election
Howard McKeon
Republican
Elected U.S. Representative
Howard McKeon
Republican

California's 25th congressional district (map) has been represented by Republican Howard McKeon of Santa Clarita since January 3, 1993.

- Race ranking and details from CQ Politics
- Campaign contributions from OpenSecrets
- Race profile at The New York Times

=== Predictions ===
Source	Ranking	As of
The Cook Political Report	Safe R	November 1, 2010
Rothenberg	Safe R	November 1, 2010
Sabato's Crystal Ball	Safe R	November 1, 2010
RCP	Safe R	November 1, 2010
CQ Politics	Safe R	October 28, 2010
New York Times	Safe R	November 1, 2010
FiveThirtyEight	Safe R	November 1, 2010

California's 25th congressional district election, 2010
Party	Candidate	Votes	%
Republican	Howard McKeon (incumbent)	118,308	61.9
Democratic	Jackie Conaway	73,028	38.1
Total votes		191,336	100.0
Republican hold			

== District 26 ==
2010 California's 26th congressional district election
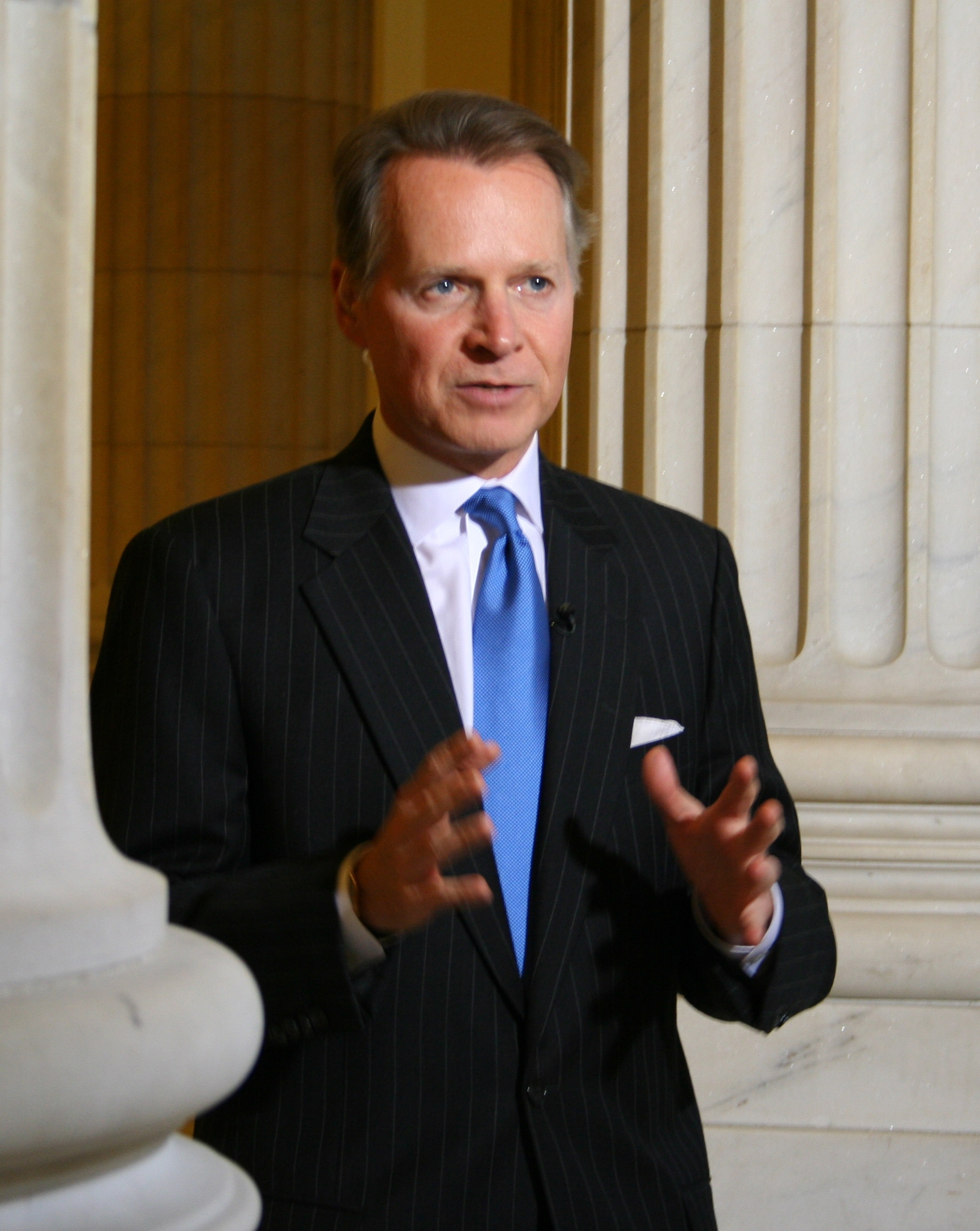

Nominee	David Dreier	Russ Warner	David L. Miller
Party	Republican	Democratic	American Independent
Popular vote	112,774	76,093	12,784
Percentage	54.2%	36.5%	6.1%
- County results Dreier: 50–60%
U.S. Representative before election
David Dreier
Republican
Elected U.S. Representative
David Dreier
Republican

California's 26th congressional district (map) has been represented by Republican David Dreier of San Dimas since January 3, 2003, when he was redistricted from the 28th district.

- Race ranking and details from CQ Politics
- Campaign contributions from OpenSecrets
- Race profile at The New York Times

=== Predictions ===
Source	Ranking	As of
The Cook Political Report	Safe R	November 1, 2010
Rothenberg	Safe R	November 1, 2010
Sabato's Crystal Ball	Safe R	November 1, 2010
RCP	Safe R	November 1, 2010
CQ Politics	Safe R	October 28, 2010
New York Times	Safe R	November 1, 2010
FiveThirtyEight	Safe R	November 1, 2010

California's 26th congressional district election, 2010
Party	Candidate	Votes	%
Republican	David Dreier (incumbent)	112,774	54.2
Democratic	Russ Warner	76,093	36.5
American Independent	David L. Miller	12,784	6.1
Libertarian	Randall Weissbuch	6,696	3.2
Total votes		208,347	100.0
Republican hold			

== District 27 ==
2010 California's 27th congressional district election
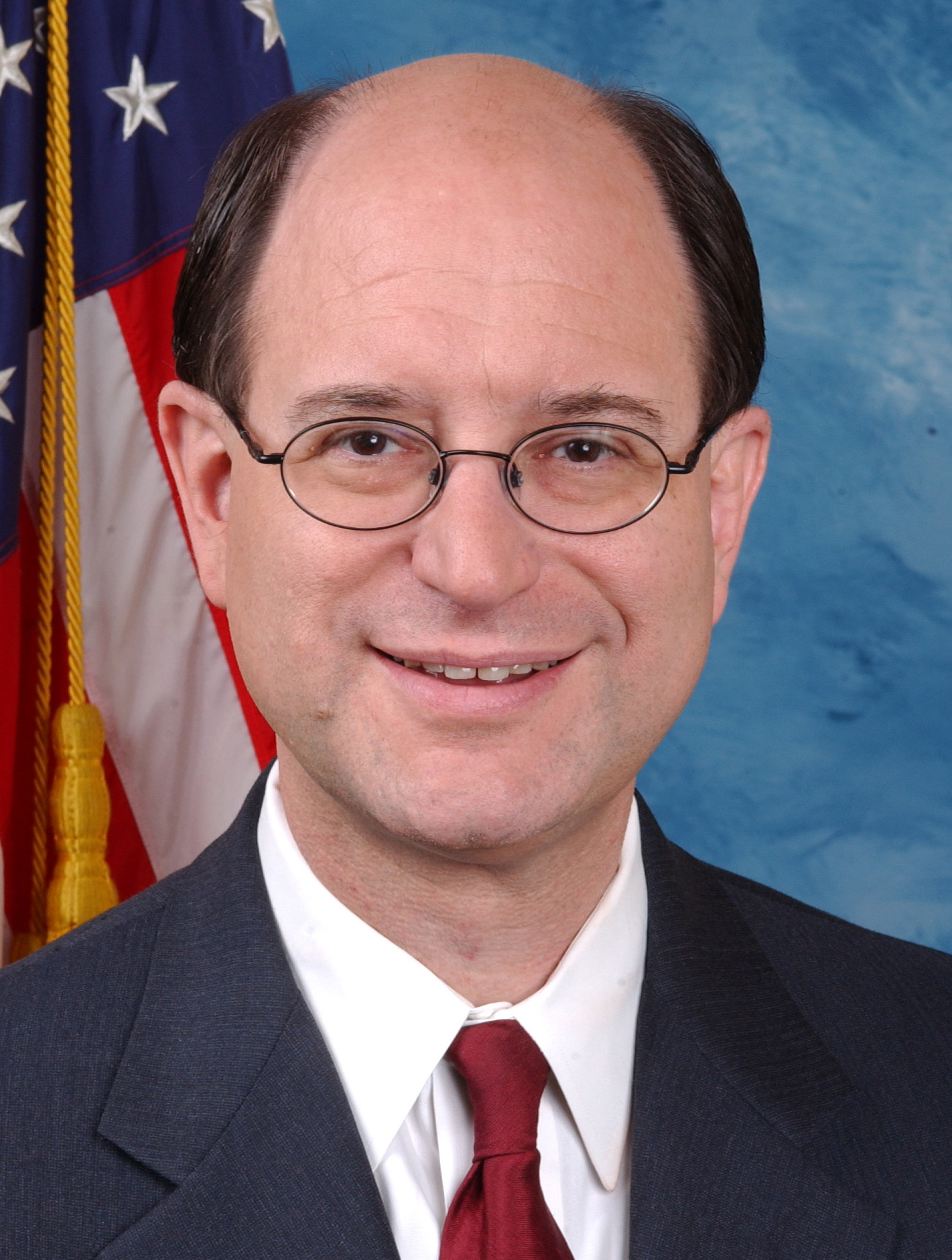

Nominee	Brad Sherman	Mark Reed
Party	Democratic	Republican
Popular vote	102,927	55,056
Percentage	65.2%	34.8%
- County results Sherman: 60–70%
U.S. Representative before election
Brad Sherman
Democratic
Elected U.S. Representative
Brad Sherman
Democratic

California's 27th congressional district (map) has been represented by Democrat Brad Sherman of Sherman Oaks since January 3, 2003, when he was redistricted from the 24th district.

- Race ranking and details from CQ Politics
- Campaign contributions from OpenSecrets
- Race profile at The New York Times

=== Predictions ===
Source	Ranking	As of
The Cook Political Report	Safe D	November 1, 2010
Rothenberg	Safe D	November 1, 2010
Sabato's Crystal Ball	Safe D	November 1, 2010
RCP	Safe D	November 1, 2010
CQ Politics	Safe D	October 28, 2010
New York Times	Safe D	November 1, 2010
FiveThirtyEight	Safe D	November 1, 2010

California's 27th congressional district election, 2010
Party	Candidate	Votes	%
Democratic	Brad Sherman (incumbent)	102,927	65.2
Republican	Mark Reed	55,056	34.8
Total votes		157,983	100.0
Democratic hold			

== District 28 ==
2010 California's 28th congressional district election
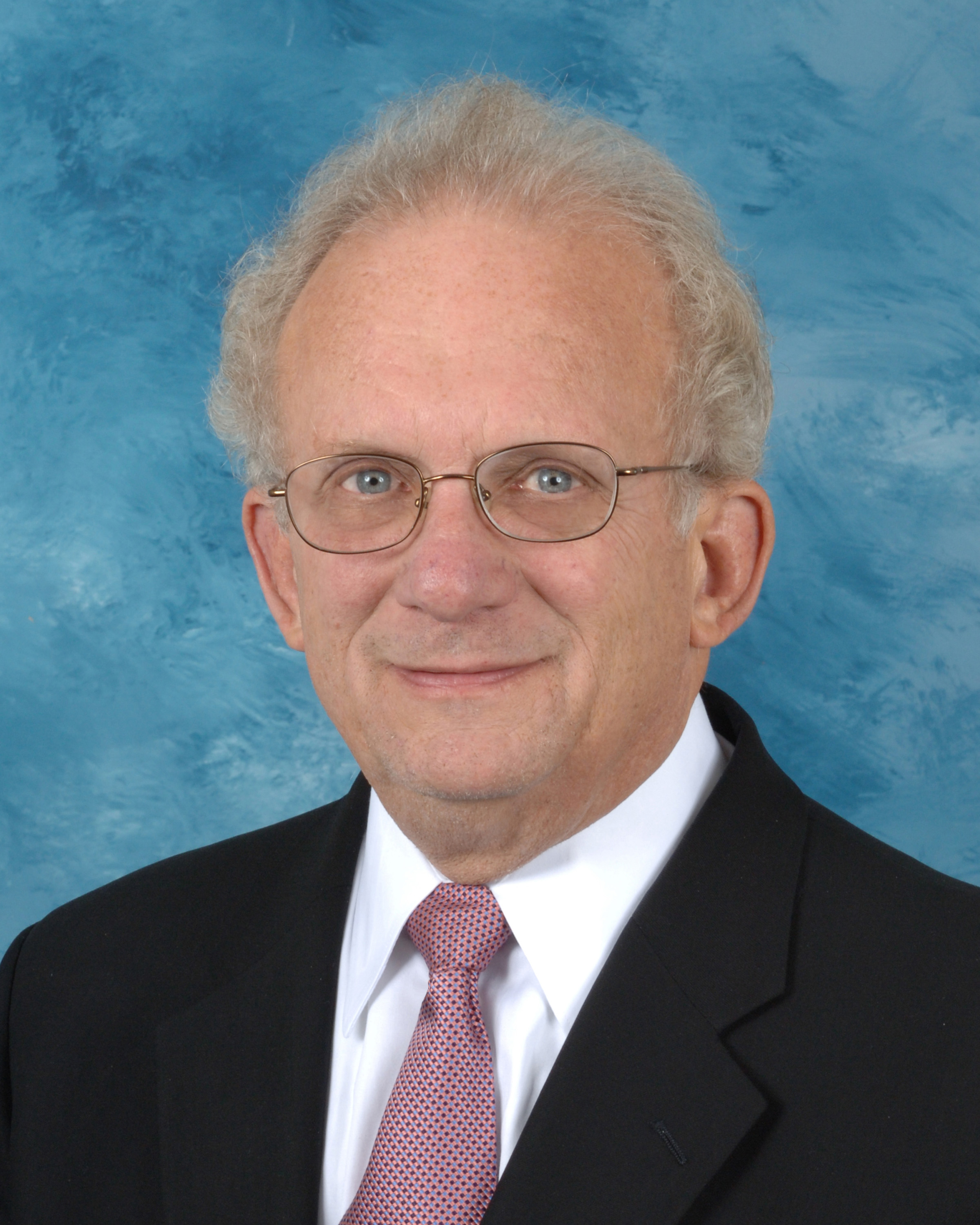

Nominee	Howard Berman	Merlin Froyd	Carlos Rodriguez
Party	Democratic	Republican	Libertarian
Popular vote	88,385	28,493	10,229
Percentage	69.6%	22.4%	8.0%
- County results Berman: 60–70%
U.S. Representative before election
Howard Berman
Democratic
Elected U.S. Representative
Howard Berman
Democratic

California's 28th congressional district (map) has been represented by Democrat Howard Berman of North Hollywood since January 3, 2003, when he was redistricted from the 26th district.

- Race ranking and details from CQ Politics
- Campaign contributions from OpenSecrets
- Race profile at The New York Times

=== Predictions ===
Source	Ranking	As of
The Cook Political Report	Safe D	November 1, 2010
Rothenberg	Safe D	November 1, 2010
Sabato's Crystal Ball	Safe D	November 1, 2010
RCP	Safe D	November 1, 2010
CQ Politics	Safe D	October 28, 2010
New York Times	Safe D	November 1, 2010
FiveThirtyEight	Safe D	November 1, 2010

California's 28th congressional district election, 2010
Party	Candidate	Votes	%
Democratic	Howard Berman (incumbent)	88,385	69.6
Republican	Merlin Froyd	28,493	22.4
Libertarian	Carlos Rodriguez	10,229	8.0
Total votes		127,107	100.0
Democratic hold			

== District 29 ==
2010 California's 29th congressional district election
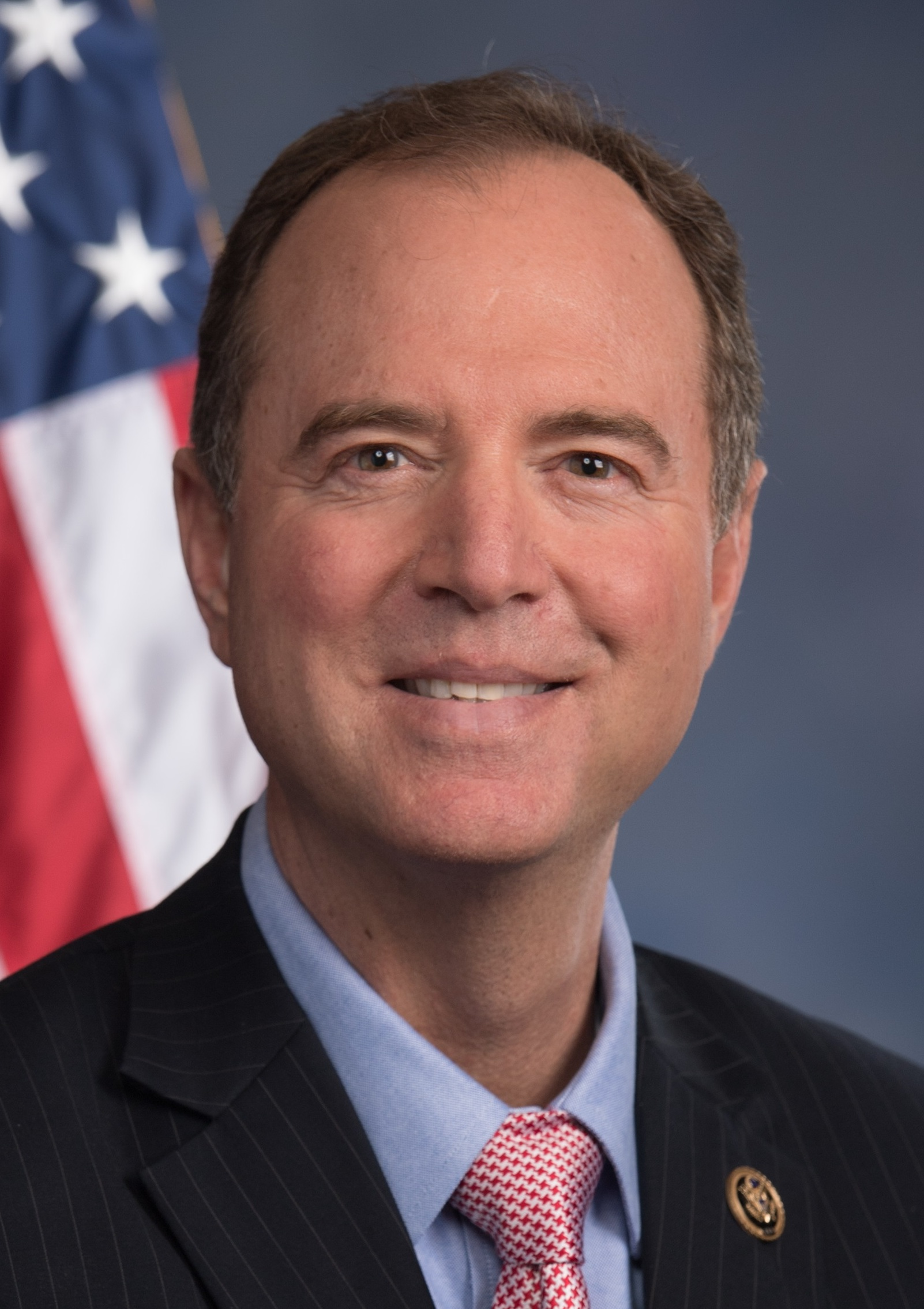

Nominee	Adam Schiff	John P. Colbert
Party	Democratic	Republican
Popular vote	104,374	51,534
Percentage	64.8%	32.0%
- County results Schiff: 60–70%
U.S. Representative before election
Adam Schiff
Democratic
Elected U.S. Representative
Adam Schiff
Democratic

California's 29th congressional district (map) has been represented by Democrat Adam Schiff of Burbank since January 3, 2003, when he was redistricted from the 27th district.

- Race ranking and details from CQ Politics
- Campaign contributions from OpenSecrets
- Race profile at The New York Times

=== Predictions ===
Source	Ranking	As of
The Cook Political Report	Safe D	November 1, 2010
Rothenberg	Safe D	November 1, 2010
Sabato's Crystal Ball	Safe D	November 1, 2010
RCP	Safe D	November 1, 2010
CQ Politics	Safe D	October 28, 2010
New York Times	Safe D	November 1, 2010
FiveThirtyEight	Safe D	November 1, 2010

California's 29th congressional district election, 2010
Party	Candidate	Votes	%
Democratic	Adam Schiff (incumbent)	104,374	64.8
Republican	John P. Colbert	51,534	32.0
Libertarian	Bill Cushing	5,218	3.2
Total votes		161,126	100.0
Democratic hold			

== District 30 ==
2010 California's 30th congressional district election
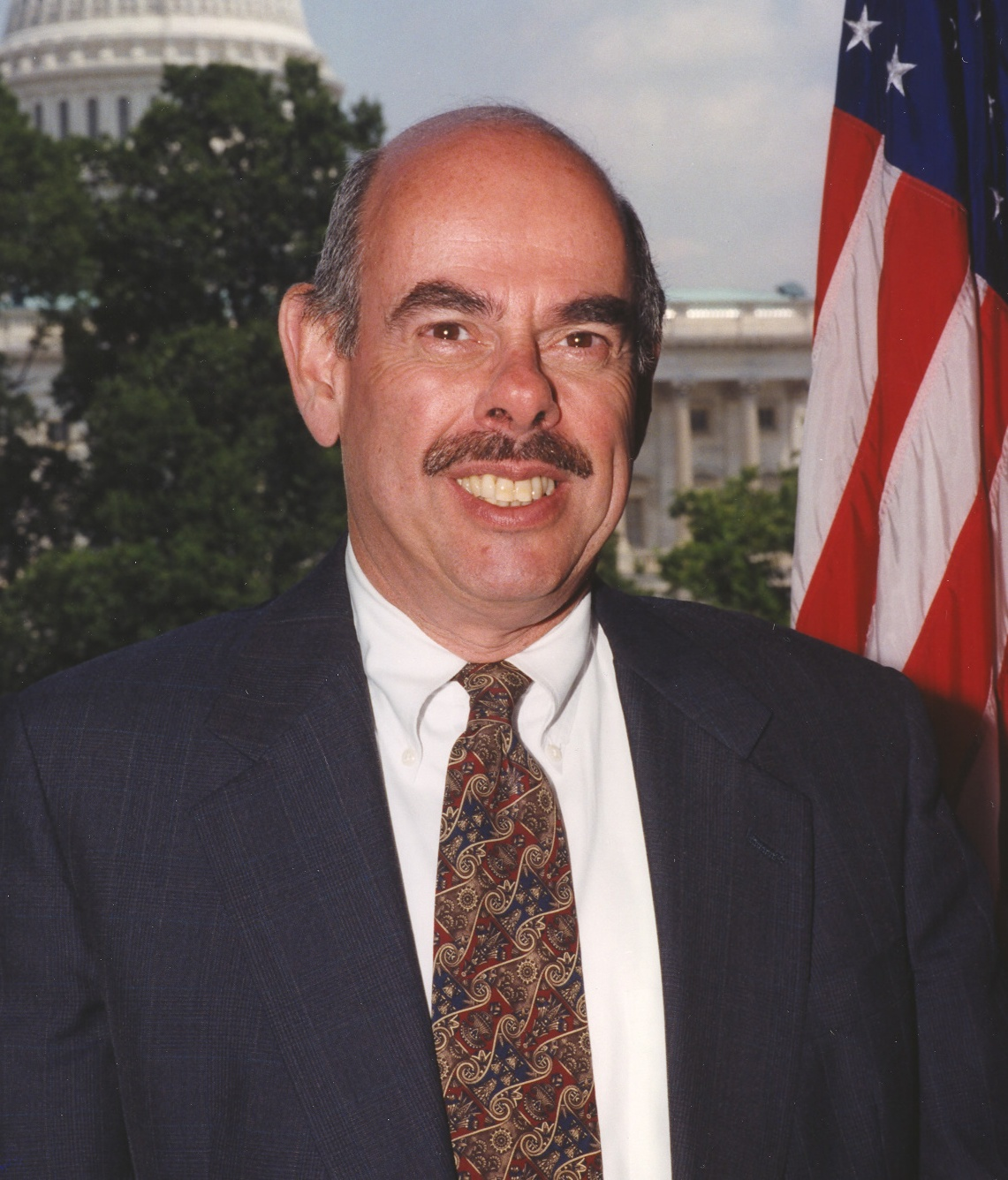

Nominee	Henry Waxman	Charles E. Wilkerson
Party	Democratic	Republican
Popular vote	153,663	75,948
Percentage	64.7%	31.9%
- County results Waxman: 60–70%
U.S. Representative before election
Henry Waxman
Democratic
Elected U.S. Representative
Henry Waxman
Democratic

California's 30th congressional district (map) has been represented by Democrat Henry Waxman of Los Angeles since January 3, 2003, when he was redistricted from the 29th district.

- Race ranking and details from CQ Politics
- Campaign contributions from OpenSecrets
- Race profile at The New York Times

=== Predictions ===
Source	Ranking	As of
The Cook Political Report	Safe D	November 1, 2010
Rothenberg	Safe D	November 1, 2010
Sabato's Crystal Ball	Safe D	November 1, 2010
RCP	Safe D	November 1, 2010
CQ Politics	Safe D	October 28, 2010
New York Times	Safe D	November 1, 2010
FiveThirtyEight	Safe D	November 1, 2010

California's 30th congressional district election, 2010
Party	Candidate	Votes	%
Democratic	Henry Waxman (incumbent)	153,663	64.7
Republican	Charles E. Wilkerson	75,948	31.9
Libertarian	Erich D. Miller	5,021	2.1
Peace and Freedom	Richard R. Castaldo	3,115	1.3
Total votes		237,747	100,0
Democratic hold			

== District 31 ==
2010 California's 31st congressional district election
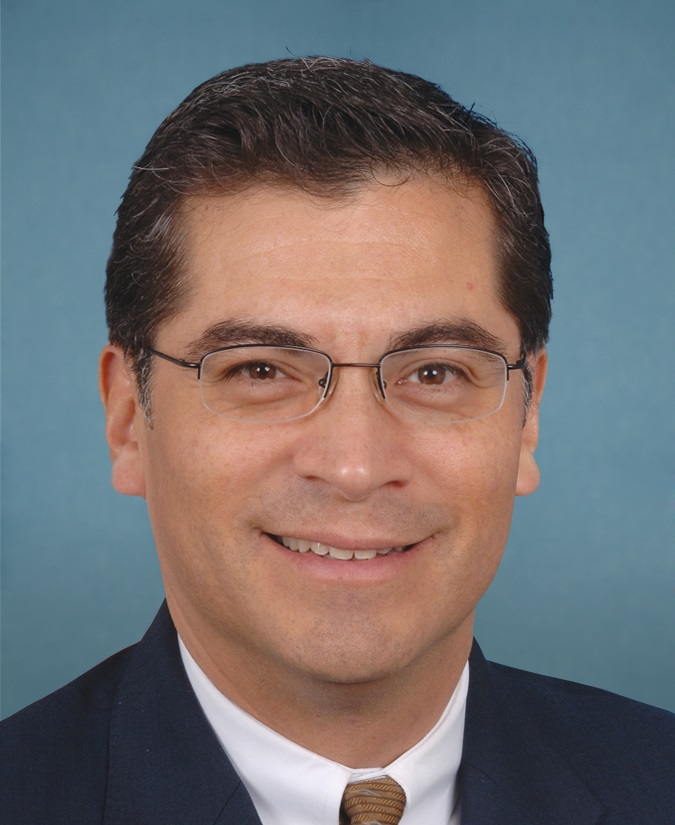

Nominee	Xavier Becerra	Stephen Carlton Smith
Party	Democratic	Republican
Popular vote	76,363	14,740
Percentage	83.8%	16.1%
- County results Becerra: 80–90%
U.S. Representative before election
Xavier Becerra
Democratic
Elected U.S. Representative
Xavier Becerra
Democratic

California's 31st congressional district (map) has been represented by Democrat Xavier Becerra of Los Angeles since January 3, 2003, when he was redistricted from the 30th district.

- Race ranking and details from CQ Politics
- Campaign contributions from OpenSecrets
- Race profile at The New York Times

=== Predictions ===
Source	Ranking	As of
The Cook Political Report	Safe D	November 1, 2010
Rothenberg	Safe D	November 1, 2010
Sabato's Crystal Ball	Safe D	November 1, 2010
RCP	Safe D	November 1, 2010
CQ Politics	Safe D	October 28, 2010
New York Times	Safe D	November 1, 2010
FiveThirtyEight	Safe D	November 1, 2010

California's 31st congressional district election, 2010
Party	Candidate	Votes	%
Democratic	Xavier Becerra (incumbent)	76,363	83.8
Republican	Stephen Carlton Smith	14,740	16.1
Democratic	Sal Genovese (write-in)	3	0.0
Total votes		91,106	100.0
Democratic hold			

== District 32 ==
2010 California's 32nd congressional district election
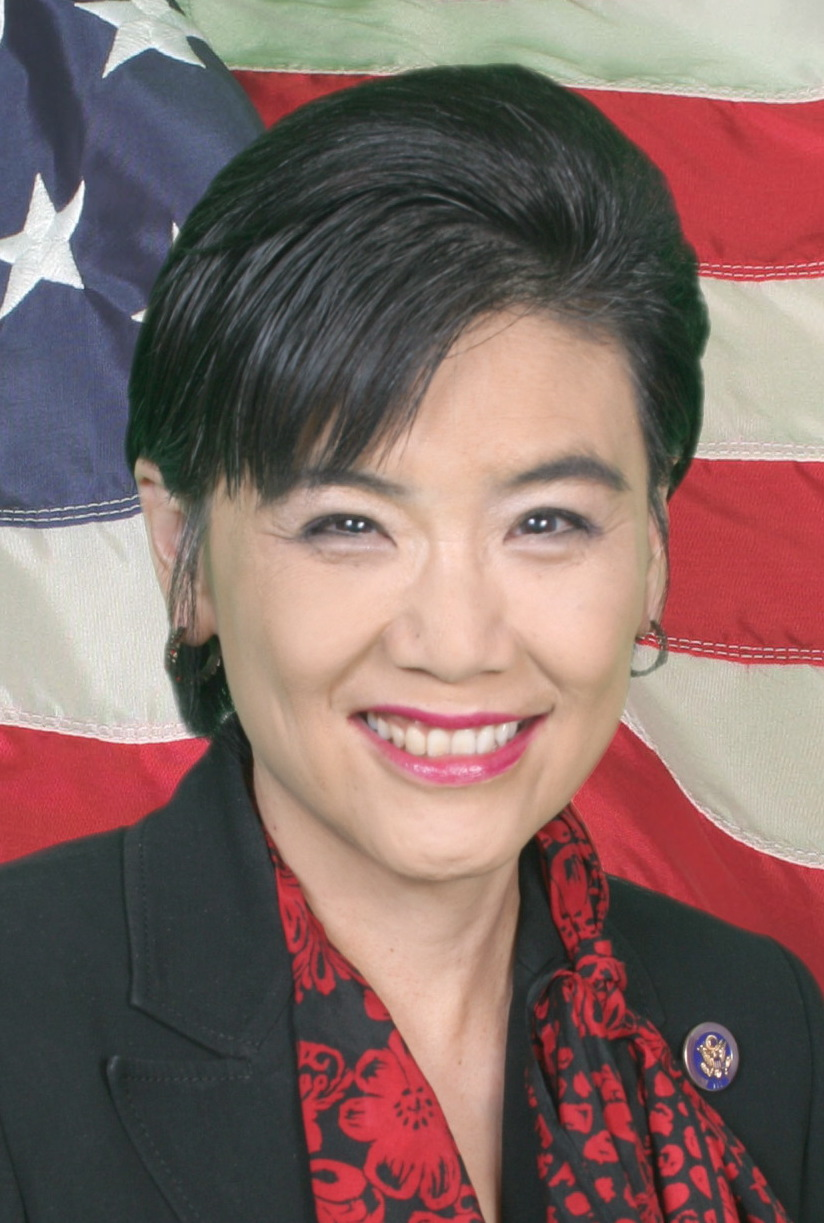

Nominee	Judy Chu	Ed Schmerling
Party	Democratic	Republican
Popular vote	77,759	31,697
Percentage	71.1%	28.9%
- County results Chu: 70–80%
U.S. Representative before election
Judy Chu
Democratic
Elected U.S. Representative
Judy Chu
Democratic

California's 32nd congressional district (map) has been represented by Democrat Judy Chu of Monterey Park since July 14, 2009.

- Race ranking and details from CQ Politics
- Campaign contributions from OpenSecrets
- Race profile at The New York Times

=== Predictions ===
Source	Ranking	As of
The Cook Political Report	Safe D	November 1, 2010
Rothenberg	Safe D	November 1, 2010
Sabato's Crystal Ball	Safe D	November 1, 2010
RCP	Safe D	November 1, 2010
CQ Politics	Safe D	October 28, 2010
New York Times	Safe D	November 1, 2010
FiveThirtyEight	Safe D	November 1, 2010

California's 32nd congressional district election, 2010
Party	Candidate	Votes	%
Democratic	Judy Chu (incumbent)	77,759	71.1
Republican	Ed Schmerling	31,697	28.9
Total votes		109,456	100.0
Democratic hold			

== District 33 ==
2010 California's 33rd congressional district election
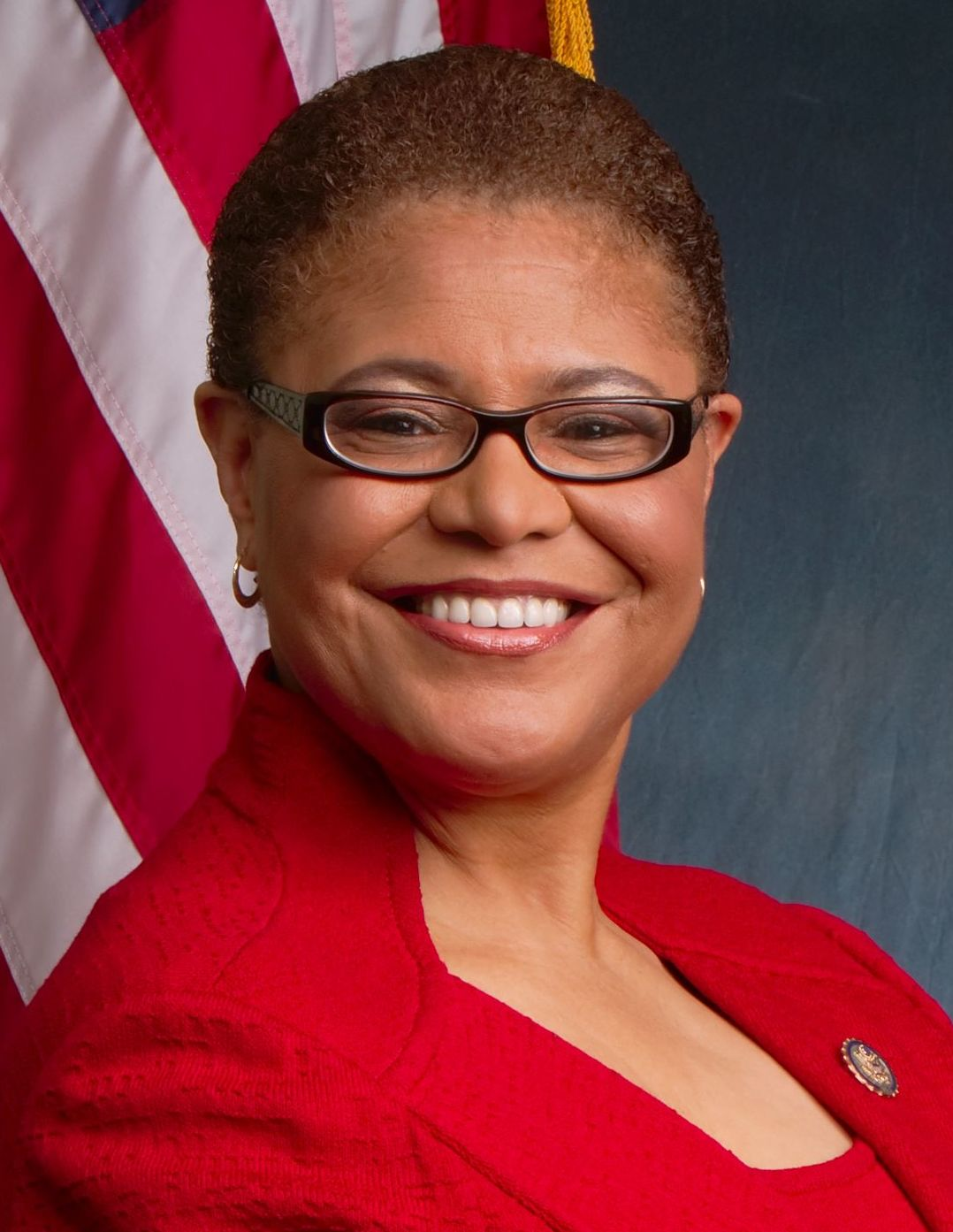

Nominee	Karen Bass	James L. Andion
Party	Democratic	Republican
Popular vote	131,990	21,342
Percentage	86.1%	13.9%
- County results Bass: 80–90%
U.S. Representative before election
Diane Watson
Democratic
Elected U.S. Representative
Karen Bass
Democratic

California's 33rd congressional district (map) has been represented by Democrat Diane Watson of Los Angeles since January 3, 2003, when she was redistricted from the 32nd district. Watson did not run for reelection.

- Race ranking and details from CQ Politics
- Campaign contributions from OpenSecrets
- Race profile at The New York Times

=== Predictions ===
Source	Ranking	As of
The Cook Political Report	Safe D	November 1, 2010
Rothenberg	Safe D	November 1, 2010
Sabato's Crystal Ball	Safe D	November 1, 2010
RCP	Safe D	November 1, 2010
CQ Politics	Safe D	October 28, 2010
New York Times	Safe D	November 1, 2010
FiveThirtyEight	Safe D	November 1, 2010

California's 33rd congressional district election, 2010
Party	Candidate	Votes	%
Democratic	Karen Bass	131,990	86.1
Republican	James L. Andion	21,342	13.9
Democratic	Mervin Leon Evans (write-in)	1	0.0
Total votes		153,333	100.0
Democratic hold			

== District 34 ==
2010 California's 34th congressional district election
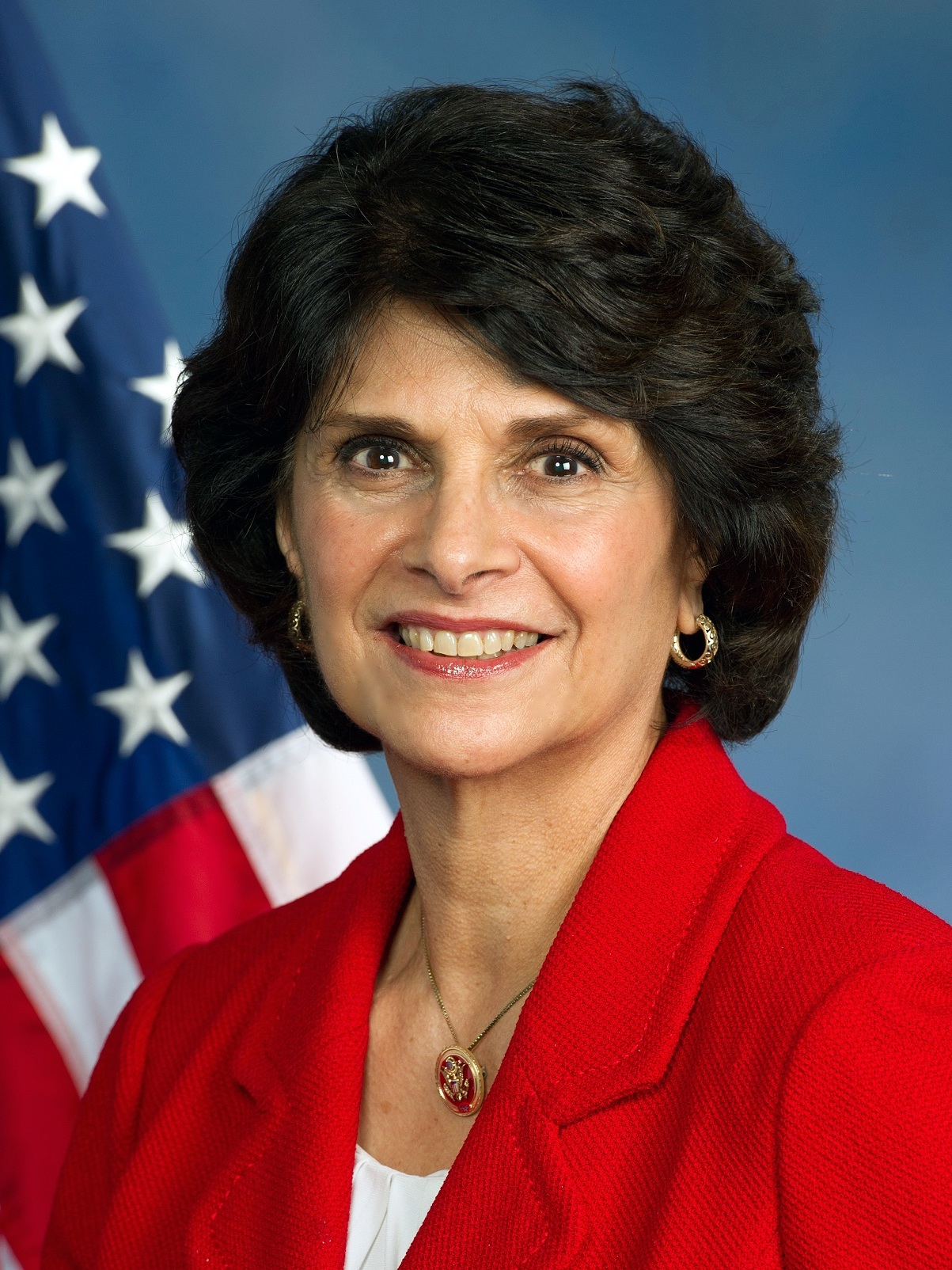

Nominee	Lucille Roybal-Allard	Wayne Miller
Party	Democratic	Republican
Popular vote	69,382	20,457
Percentage	77.3%	22.7%
- County results Roybal-Allard: 70–80%
U.S. Representative before election
Lucille Roybal-Allard
Democratic
Elected U.S. Representative
Lucille Roybal-Allard
Democratic

California's 34th congressional district (map) has been represented by Democrat Lucille Roybal-Allard of Los Angeles since January 3, 2003, when she was redistricted from the 33rd district.

- Race ranking and details from CQ Politics
- Campaign contributions from OpenSecrets
- Race profile at The New York Times

=== Predictions ===
Source	Ranking	As of
The Cook Political Report	Safe D	November 1, 2010
Rothenberg	Safe D	November 1, 2010
Sabato's Crystal Ball	Safe D	November 1, 2010
RCP	Safe D	November 1, 2010
CQ Politics	Safe D	October 28, 2010
New York Times	Safe D	November 1, 2010
FiveThirtyEight	Safe D	November 1, 2010

California's 34th congressional district election, 2010
Party	Candidate	Votes	%
Democratic	Lucille Roybal-Allard (incumbent)	69,382	77.3
Republican	Wayne Miller	20,457	22.7
Total votes		89,839	100.0
Democratic hold			

== District 35 ==
2010 California's 35th congressional district election
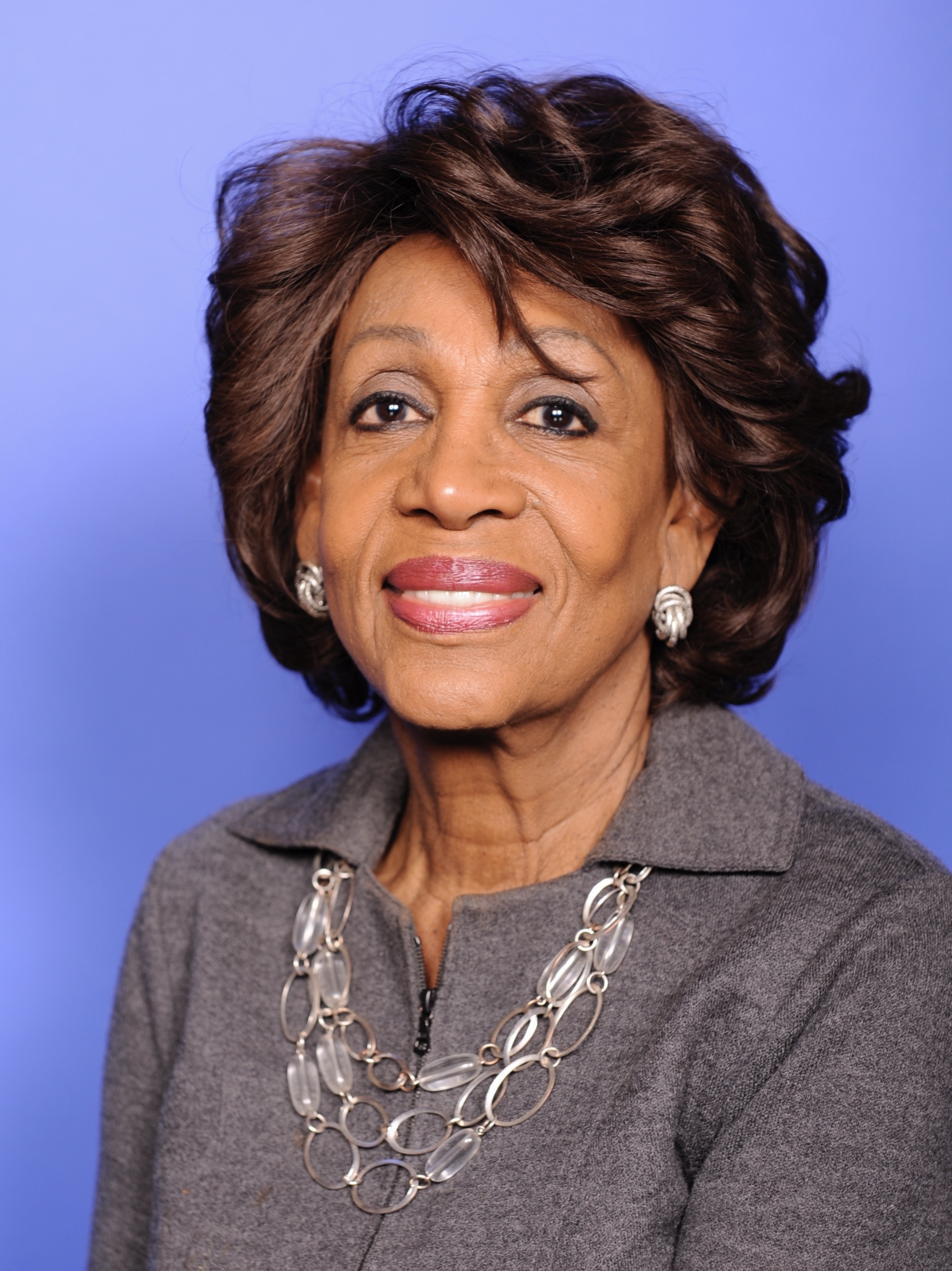

Nominee	Maxine Waters	K. Bruce Brown
Party	Democratic	Republican
Popular vote	98,131	25,561
Percentage	79.4%	20.6%
- County results Waters: 70–80%
U.S. Representative before election
Maxine Waters
Democratic
Elected U.S. Representative
Maxine Waters
Democratic

California's 35th congressional district (map) has been represented by Democrat Maxine Waters of Los Angeles since January 3, 1993, when she was redistricted from the 29th district.

- Race ranking and details from CQ Politics
- Campaign contributions from OpenSecrets
- Race profile at The New York Times

=== Predictions ===
Source	Ranking	As of
The Cook Political Report	Safe D	November 1, 2010
Rothenberg	Safe D	November 1, 2010
Sabato's Crystal Ball	Safe D	November 1, 2010
RCP	Safe D	November 1, 2010
CQ Politics	Safe D	October 28, 2010
New York Times	Safe D	November 1, 2010
FiveThirtyEight	Safe D	November 1, 2010

California's 35th congressional district election, 2010
Party	Candidate	Votes	%
Democratic	Maxine Waters (incumbent)	98,131	79.4
Republican	K. Bruce Brown	25,561	20.6
Independent	Suleiman Edmondson (write-in)	2	0.0
Total votes		123,694	100.0
Democratic hold			

== District 36 ==
2010 California's 36th congressional district election
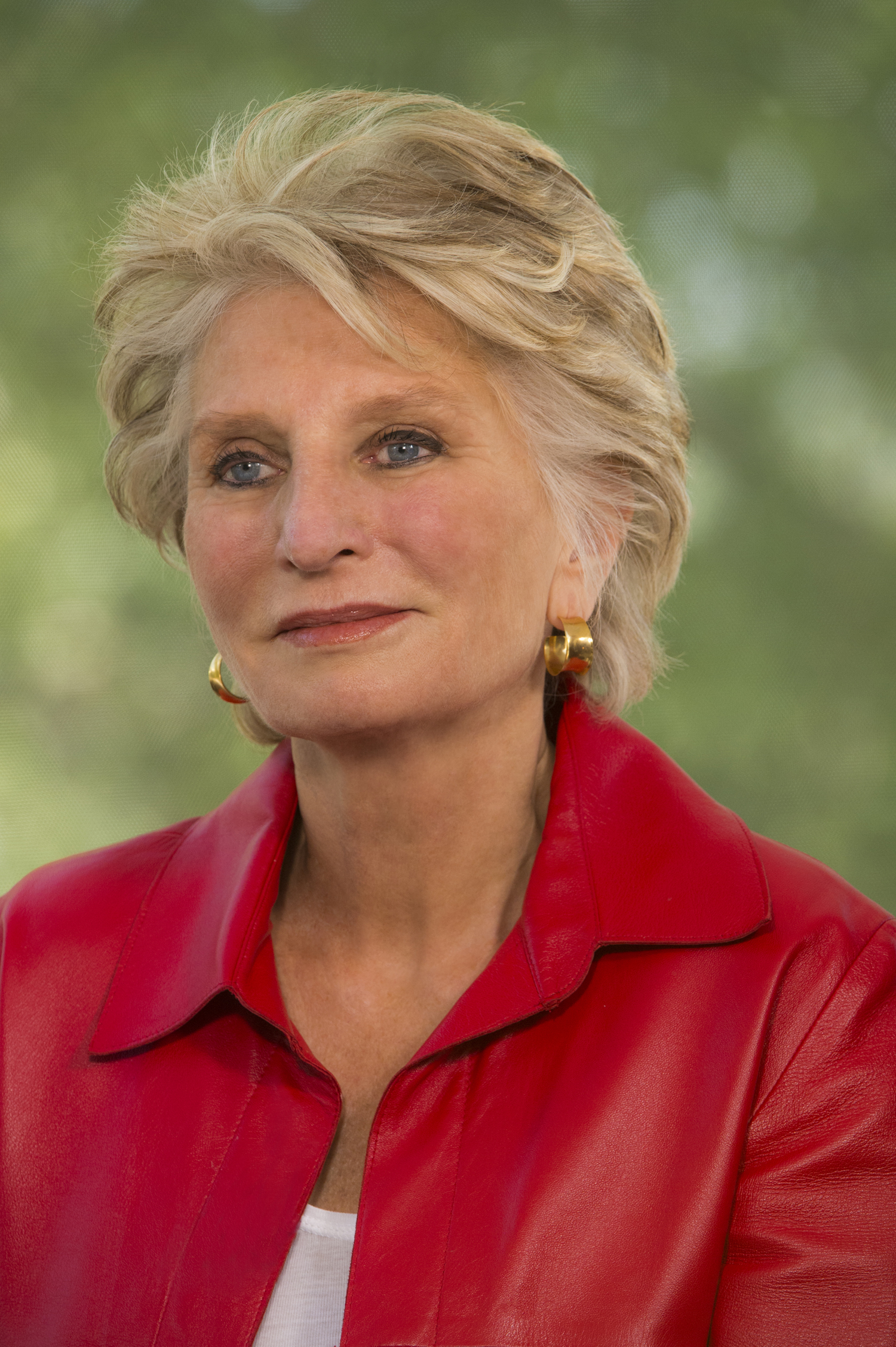

Nominee	Jane Harman	Mattie Fein	Herb Peters
Party	Democratic	Republican	Libertarian
Popular vote	114,489	66,706	10,840
Percentage	59.7%	34.7%	5.6%
- County results Harman: 50–60%
U.S. Representative before election
Jane Harman
Democratic
Elected U.S. Representative
Jane Harman
Democratic

California's 36th congressional district (map) has been represented by Democrat Jane Harman of Venice since January 3, 2001.

- Race ranking and details from CQ Politics
- Campaign contributions from OpenSecrets
- Race profile at The New York Times

=== Predictions ===
Source	Ranking	As of
The Cook Political Report	Safe D	November 1, 2010
Rothenberg	Safe D	November 1, 2010
Sabato's Crystal Ball	Safe D	November 1, 2010
RCP	Safe D	November 1, 2010
CQ Politics	Safe D	October 28, 2010
New York Times	Safe D	November 1, 2010
FiveThirtyEight	Safe D	November 1, 2010

California's 36th congressional district election, 2010
Party	Candidate	Votes	%
Democratic	Jane Harman (incumbent)	114,489	59.7
Republican	Mattie Fein	66,706	34.7
Libertarian	Herb Peters	10,840	5.6
Total votes		192,035	100.0
Democratic hold			

== District 37 ==
2010 California's 37th congressional district election
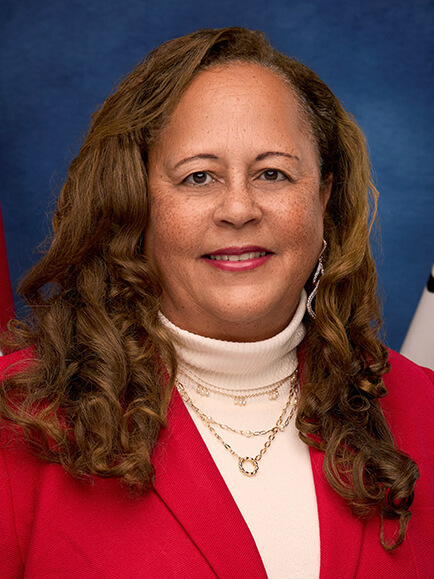

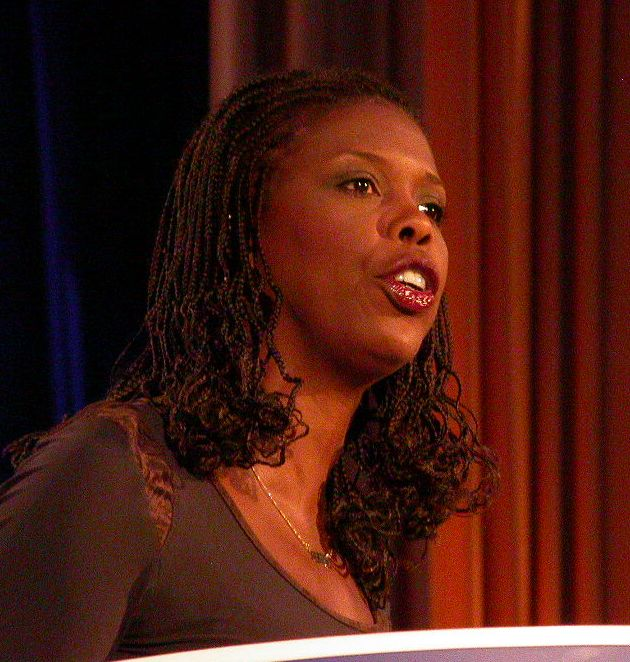

Nominee	Laura Richardson	Star Parker	Nick Dibs
Party	Democratic	Republican	Independent
Popular vote	85,799	29,159	10,560
Percentage	68.4%	23.2%	8.4%
- County results Richardson: 60–70%
U.S. Representative before election
Laura Richardson
Democratic
Elected U.S. Representative
Laura Richardson
Democratic

California's 37th congressional district (map) has been represented by Democrat Laura Richardson of Long Beach since August 21, 2007.

- Race ranking and details from CQ Politics
- Campaign contributions from OpenSecrets
- Race profile at The New York Times

=== Predictions ===
Source	Ranking	As of
The Cook Political Report	Safe D	November 1, 2010
Rothenberg	Safe D	November 1, 2010
Sabato's Crystal Ball	Safe D	November 1, 2010
RCP	Safe D	November 1, 2010
CQ Politics	Safe D	October 28, 2010
New York Times	Safe D	November 1, 2010
FiveThirtyEight	Safe D	November 1, 2010

California's 37th congressional district election, 2010
Party	Candidate	Votes	%
Democratic	Laura Richardson (incumbent)	85,799	68.4
Republican	Star Parker	29,159	23.2
Independent	Nick Dibs	10,560	8.4
Total votes		125,518	100.0
Democratic hold			

== District 38 ==
2010 California's 38th congressional district election
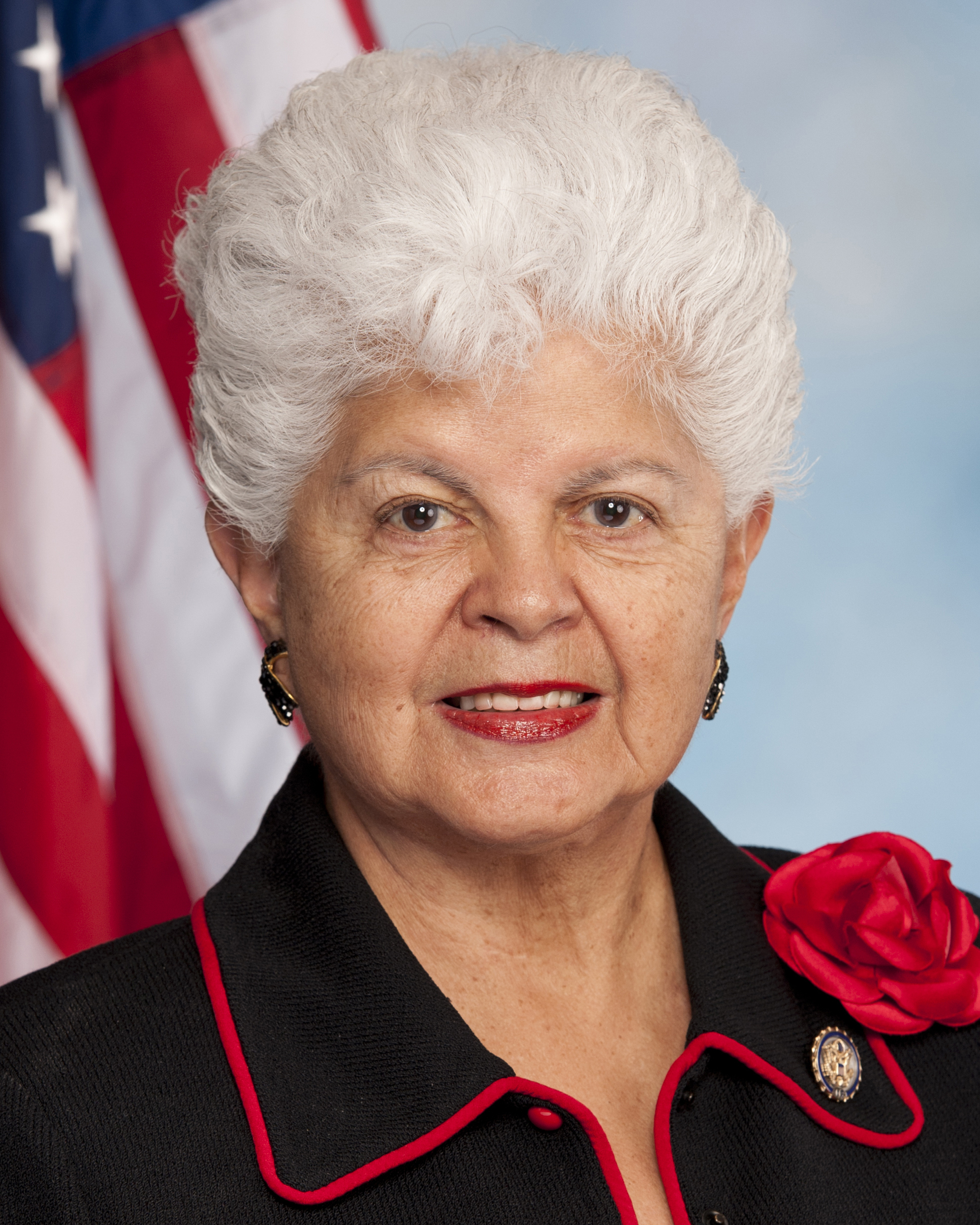

Nominee	Grace Napolitano	Robert Vaughn
Party	Democratic	Republican
Popular vote	85,459	30,883
Percentage	73.5%	26.5%
- County results Napolitano: 70–80%
U.S. Representative before election
Grace Napolitano
Democratic
Elected U.S. Representative
Grace Napolitano
Democratic

California's 38th congressional district (map) has been represented by Democrat Grace Napolitano of Norwalk since January 3, 2003, when she was redistricted from the 34th district.

- Race ranking and details from CQ Politics
- Campaign contributions from OpenSecrets
- Race profile at The New York Times

=== Predictions ===
Source	Ranking	As of
The Cook Political Report	Safe D	November 1, 2010
Rothenberg	Safe D	November 1, 2010
Sabato's Crystal Ball	Safe D	November 1, 2010
RCP	Safe D	November 1, 2010
CQ Politics	Safe D	October 28, 2010
New York Times	Safe D	November 1, 2010
FiveThirtyEight	Safe D	November 1, 2010

California's 38th congressional district election, 2010
Party	Candidate	Votes	%
Democratic	Grace Napolitano (incumbent)	85,459	73.5
Republican	Robert Vaughn	30,883	26.5
Total votes		116,342	100.0
Democratic hold			

== District 39 ==
2010 California's 39th congressional district election
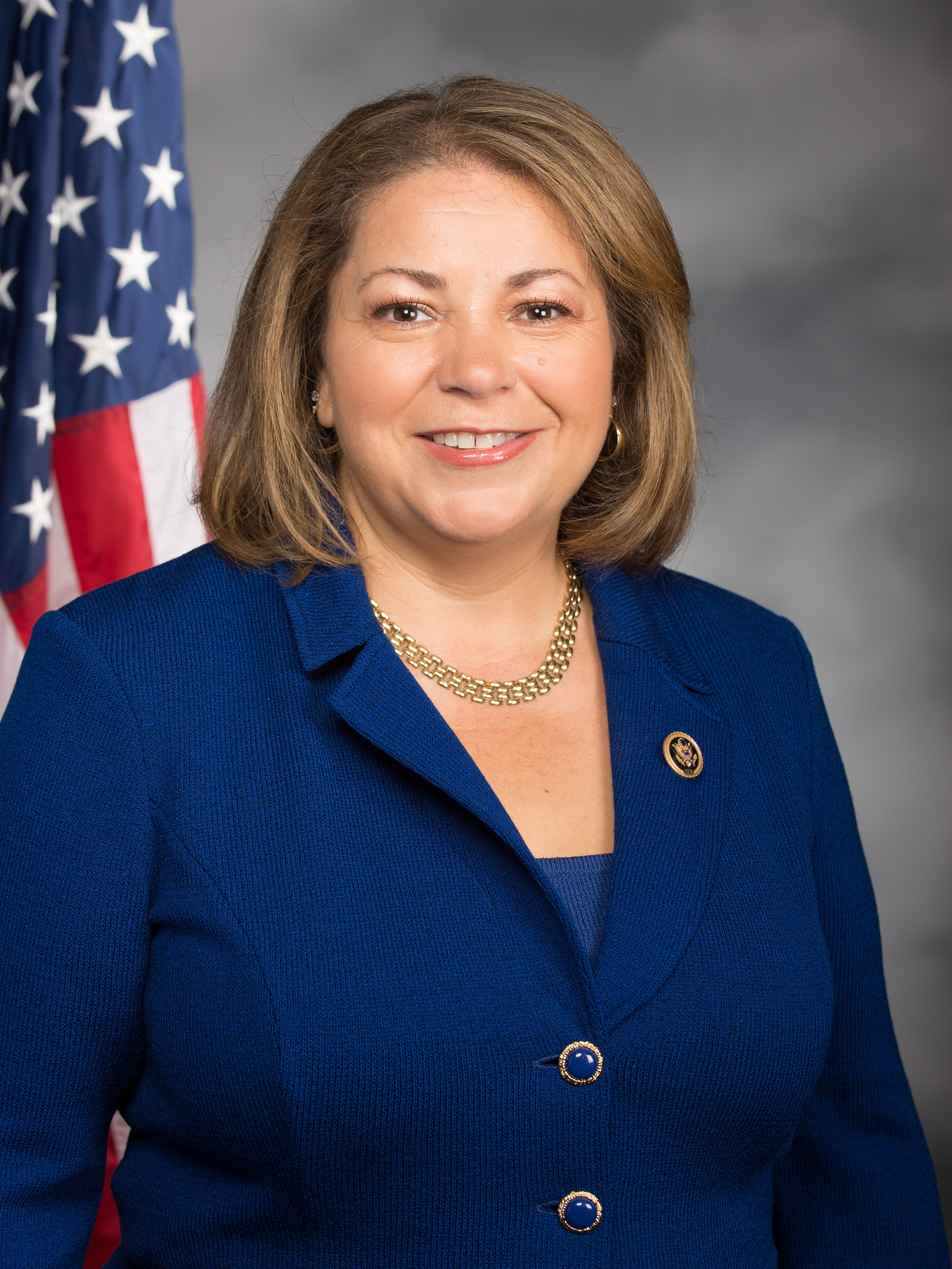

Nominee	Linda Sánchez	Larry Steven Andre
Party	Democratic	Republican
Popular vote	81,590	42,037
Percentage	63.3%	32.6%
- County results Sanchez: 60–70%
U.S. Representative before election
Linda Sánchez
Democratic
Elected U.S. Representative
Linda Sánchez
Democratic

California's 39th congressional district (map) has been represented by Democrat Linda Sánchez of Lakewood since January 3, 2003.

- Race ranking and details from CQ Politics
- Campaign contributions from OpenSecrets
- Race profile at The New York Times

=== Predictions ===
Source	Ranking	As of
The Cook Political Report	Safe D	November 1, 2010
Rothenberg	Safe D	November 1, 2010
Sabato's Crystal Ball	Safe D	November 1, 2010
RCP	Safe D	November 1, 2010
CQ Politics	Safe D	October 28, 2010
New York Times	Safe D	November 1, 2010
FiveThirtyEight	Safe D	November 1, 2010

California's 39th congressional district election, 2010
Party	Candidate	Votes	%
Democratic	Linda Sánchez (incumbent)	81,590	63.3
Republican	Larry Steven Andre	42,037	32.6
American Independent	John A. Smith	5,334	4.1
Total votes		128,961	100.0
Democratic hold			

== District 40 ==
2010 California's 40th congressional district election
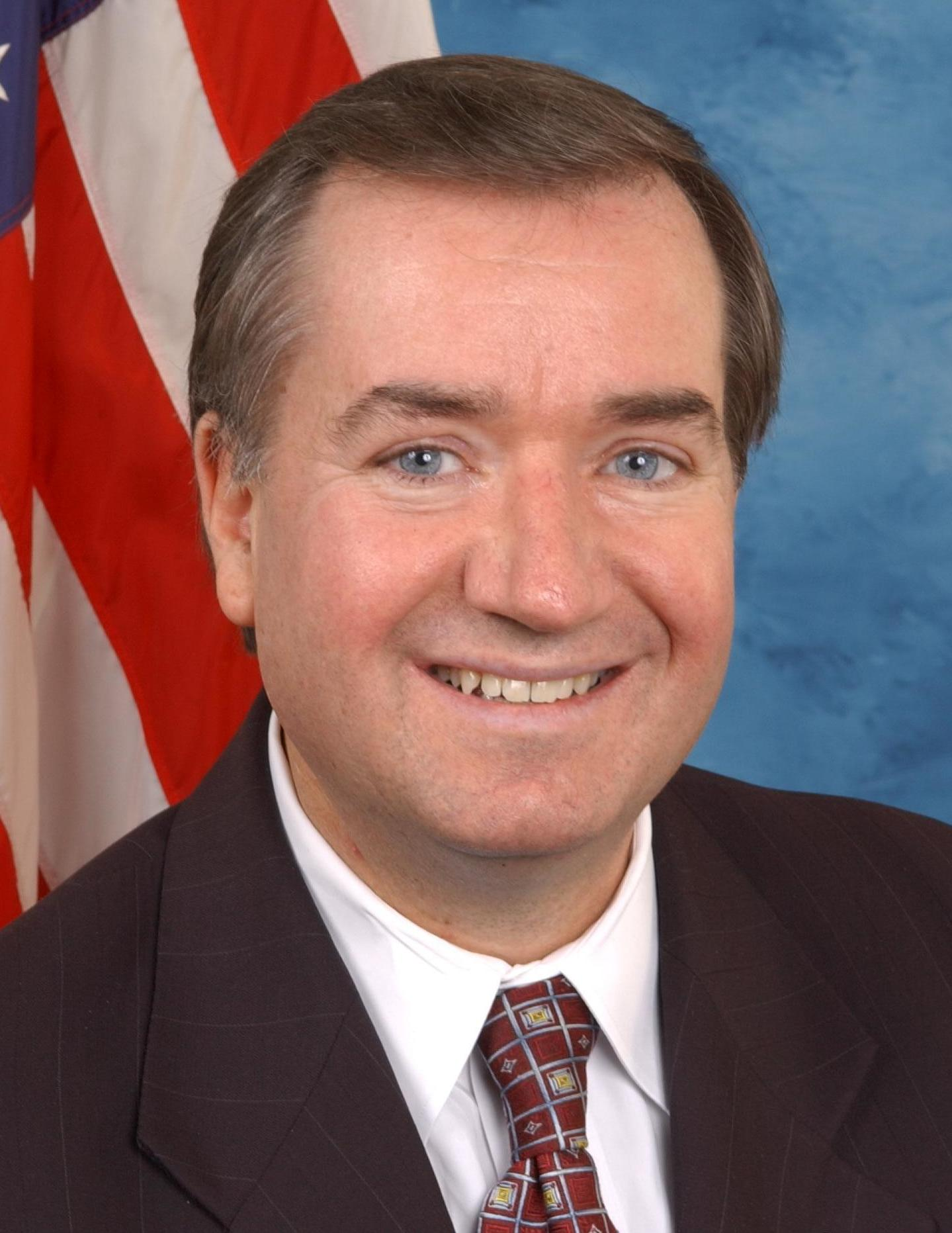

Nominee	Ed Royce	Christina Avalos
Party	Republican	Democratic
Popular vote	119,455	59,400
Percentage	66.8%	33.2%
- County results Royce: 60–70%
U.S. Representative before election
Ed Royce
Republican
Elected U.S. Representative
Ed Royce
Republican

California's 40th congressional district (map) has been represented by Republican Ed Royce of Fullerton since January 3, 2003, when he was redistricted from the 39th district.

- Race ranking and details from CQ Politics
- Campaign contributions from OpenSecrets
- Race profile at The New York Times

=== Predictions ===
Source	Ranking	As of
The Cook Political Report	Safe R	November 1, 2010
Rothenberg	Safe R	November 1, 2010
Sabato's Crystal Ball	Safe R	November 1, 2010
RCP	Safe R	November 1, 2010
CQ Politics	Safe R	October 28, 2010
New York Times	Safe R	November 1, 2010
FiveThirtyEight	Safe R	November 1, 2010

California's 40th congressional district election, 2010
Party	Candidate	Votes	%
Republican	Ed Royce (incumbent)	119,455	66.8
Democratic	Christina Avalos	59,400	33.2
Total votes		178,855	100.0
Republican hold			

== District 41 ==
2010 California's 41st congressional district election
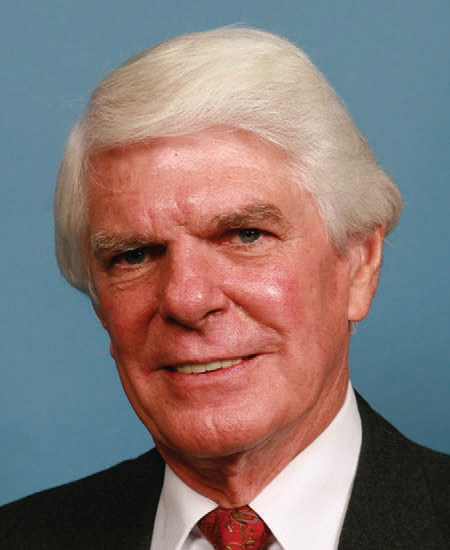

Nominee	Jerry Lewis	Pat Meagher
Party	Republican	Democratic
Popular vote	127,857	74,394
Percentage	63.3%	36.7%
- County results Lewis: 50–60% 60–70%
U.S. Representative before election
Jerry Lewis
Republican
Elected U.S. Representative
Jerry Lewis
Republican

California's 41st congressional district (map) has been represented by Republican Jerry Lewis of Redlands since January 3, 2003, when he was redistricted from the 40th district.

- Race ranking and details from CQ Politics
- Campaign contributions from OpenSecrets
- Race profile at The New York Times

=== Predictions ===
Source	Ranking	As of
The Cook Political Report	Safe R	November 1, 2010
Rothenberg	Safe R	November 1, 2010
Sabato's Crystal Ball	Safe R	November 1, 2010
RCP	Safe R	November 1, 2010
CQ Politics	Safe R	October 28, 2010
New York Times	Safe R	November 1, 2010
FiveThirtyEight	Safe R	November 1, 2010

California's 41st congressional district election, 2010
Party	Candidate	Votes	%
Republican	Jerry Lewis (incumbent)	127,857	63.3
Democratic	Pat Meagher	74,394	36.7
Independent	Pamela Zander (write-in)	35	0.0
Total votes		202,286	100.0
Republican hold			

== District 42 ==
2010 California's 42nd congressional district election
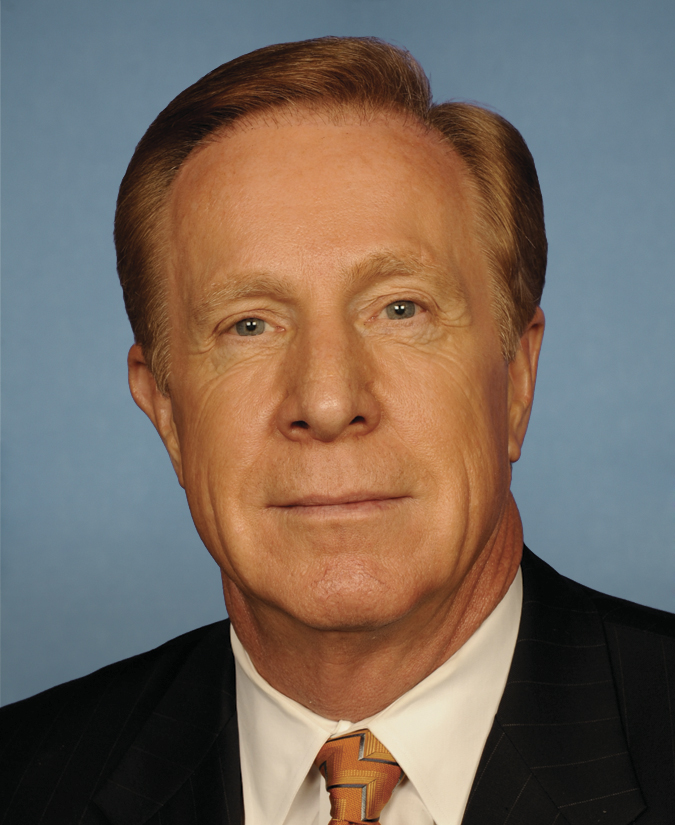

Nominee	Gary Miller	Michael Dale Williamson	Mark Lambert
Party	Republican	Democratic	Libertarian
Popular vote	127,161	65,122	12,115
Percentage	62.3%	31.8%	5.9%
- County results Miller: 50–60% 60–70%
U.S. Representative before election
Gary Miller
Republican
Elected U.S. Representative
Gary Miller
Republican

California's 42nd congressional district (map) has been represented by Republican Gary Miller of Diamond Bar since January 3, 2003, when he was redistricted from the 41st district.

- Race ranking and details from CQ Politics
- Campaign contributions from OpenSecrets
- Race profile at The New York Times

=== Predictions ===
Source	Ranking	As of
The Cook Political Report	Safe R	November 1, 2010
Rothenberg	Safe R	November 1, 2010
Sabato's Crystal Ball	Safe R	November 1, 2010
RCP	Safe R	November 1, 2010
CQ Politics	Safe R	October 28, 2010
New York Times	Safe R	November 1, 2010
FiveThirtyEight	Safe R	November 1, 2010

California's 42nd congressional district election, 2010
Party	Candidate	Votes	%
Republican	Gary Miller (incumbent)	127,161	62.3
Democratic	Michael Dale Williamson	65,122	31.8
Libertarian	Mark Lambert	12,115	5.9
Total votes		204,398	100.0
Republican hold			

== District 43 ==
2010 California's 43rd congressional district election
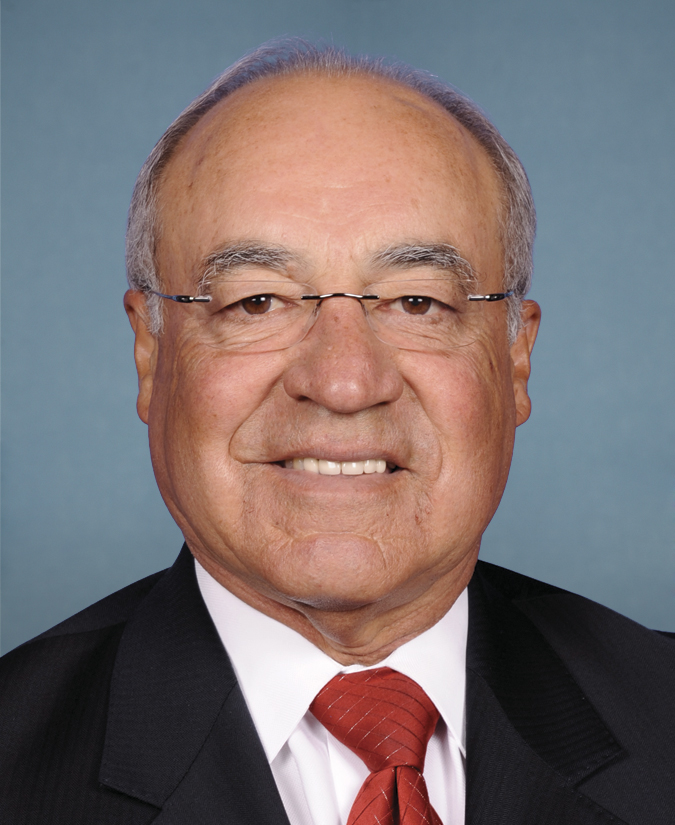

Nominee	Joe Baca	Scott Folkens
Party	Democratic	Republican
Popular vote	70,026	36,890
Percentage	65.5%	34.5%
- County results Baca: 60–70%
U.S. Representative before election
Joe Baca
Democratic
Elected U.S. Representative
Joe Baca
Democratic

California's 43rd congressional district (map) has been represented by Democrat Joe Baca of Rialto since January 3, 2003, when he was redistricted from the 42nd district.

- Race ranking and details from CQ Politics
- Campaign contributions from OpenSecrets
- Race profile at The New York Times

=== Predictions ===
Source	Ranking	As of
The Cook Political Report	Safe D	November 1, 2010
Rothenberg	Safe D	November 1, 2010
Sabato's Crystal Ball	Safe D	November 1, 2010
RCP	Safe D	November 1, 2010
CQ Politics	Safe D	October 28, 2010
New York Times	Safe D	November 1, 2010
FiveThirtyEight	Safe D	November 1, 2010

California's 43rd congressional district election, 2010
Party	Candidate	Votes	%
Democratic	Joe Baca (incumbent)	70,026	65.5
Republican	Scott Folkens	36,890	34.5
Total votes		106,916	100.0
Democratic hold			

== District 44 ==
2010 California's 44th congressional district election
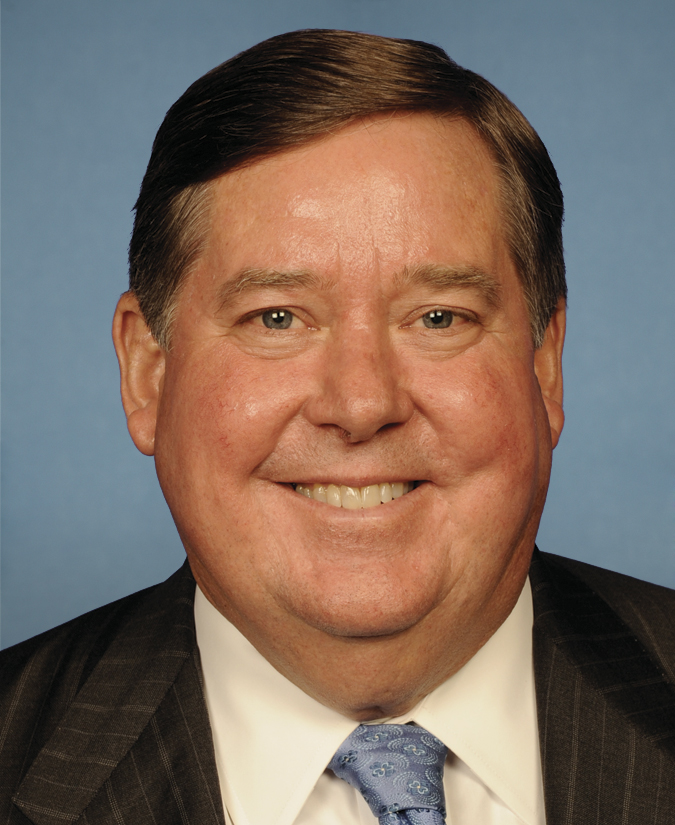

Nominee	Ken Calvert	Bill Hedrick
Party	Republican	Democratic
Popular vote	107,482	85,784
Percentage	55.7%	44.3%
- County results Calvert: 50–60% 60–70%
U.S. Representative before election
Ken Calvert
Republican
Elected U.S. Representative
Ken Calvert
Republican

California's 44th congressional district (map) has been represented by Republican Ken Calvert of Corona since January 3, 2003, when he was redistricted from the 43rd district.

- Race ranking and details from CQ Politics
- Campaign contributions from OpenSecrets
- Race profile at The New York Times

=== Predictions ===
Source	Ranking	As of
The Cook Political Report	Safe R	November 1, 2010
Rothenberg	Safe R	November 1, 2010
Sabato's Crystal Ball	Likely R	November 1, 2010
RCP	Safe R	November 1, 2010
CQ Politics	Safe R	October 28, 2010
New York Times	Safe R	November 1, 2010
FiveThirtyEight	Safe R	November 1, 2010

California's 44th congressional district election, 2010
Party	Candidate	Votes	%
Republican	Ken Calvert (incumbent)	107,482	55.7
Democratic	Bill Hedrick	85,784	44.3
Total votes		193,266	100.0
Republican hold			

== District 45 ==
2010 California's 45th congressional district election
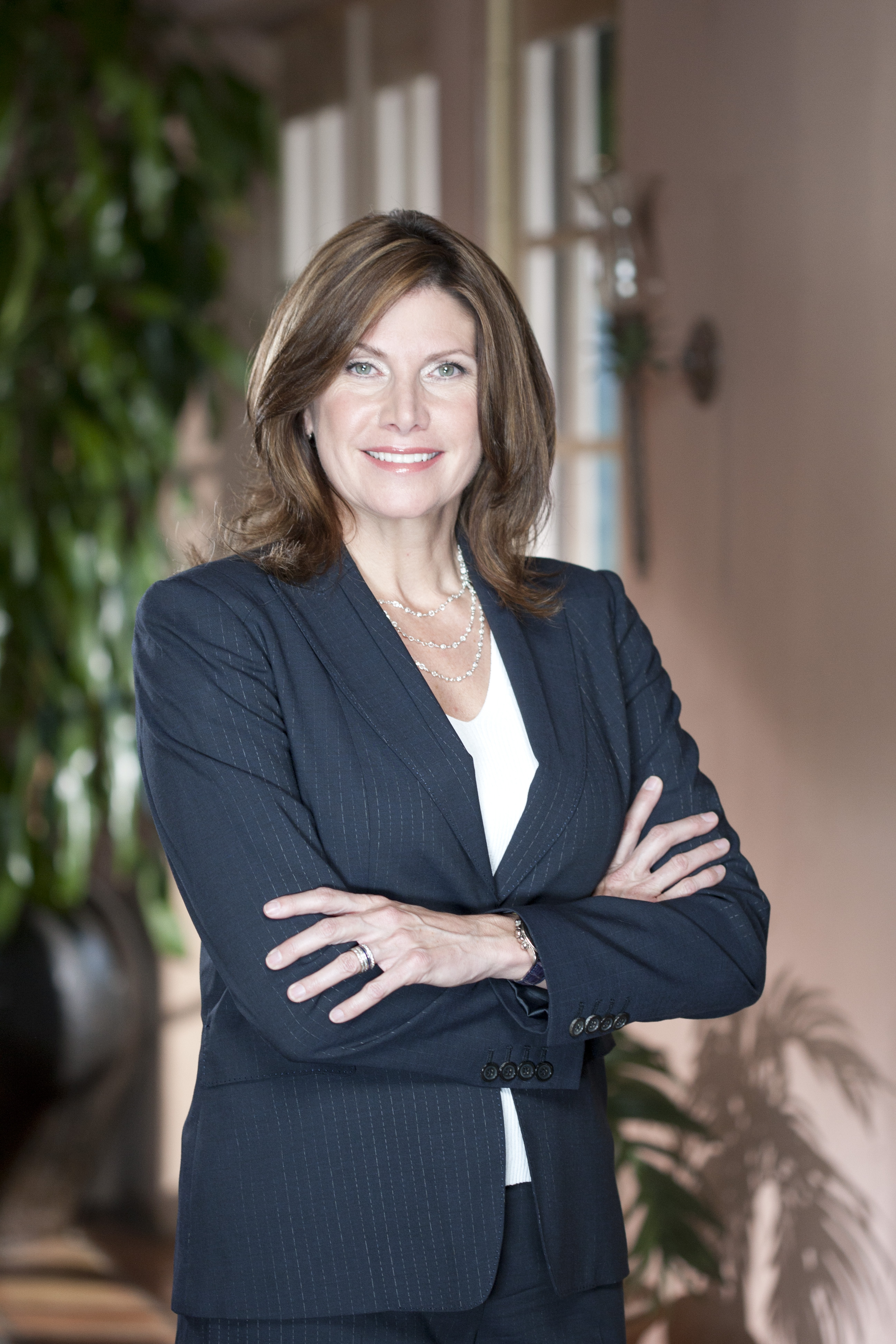

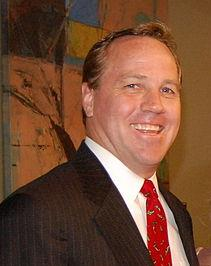

Nominee	Mary Bono Mack	Steve Pougnet	Bill Lussenheide
Party	Republican	Democratic	American Independent
Popular vote	106,472	87,141	13,188
Percentage	51.5%	42.2%	6.3%
- County results Mack: 50–60%
U.S. Representative before election
Mary Bono Mack
Republican
Elected U.S. Representative
Mary Bono Mack
Republican

California's 45th congressional district (map) has been represented by Republican Mary Bono Mack of Palm Springs since January 3, 2003, when she was redistricted from the 44th district.

- Race ranking and details from CQ Politics
- Campaign contributions from OpenSecrets
- Race profile at The New York Times

=== Predictions ===
Source	Ranking	As of
The Cook Political Report	Safe R	November 1, 2010
Rothenberg	Safe R	November 1, 2010
Sabato's Crystal Ball	Likely R	November 1, 2010
RCP	Likely R	November 1, 2010
CQ Politics	Safe R	October 28, 2010
New York Times	Safe R	November 1, 2010
FiveThirtyEight	Safe R	November 1, 2010

California's 45th congressional district election, 2010
Party	Candidate	Votes	%
Republican	Mary Bono Mack (incumbent)	106,472	51.5
Democratic	Steve Pougnet	87,141	42.2
American Independent	Bill Lussenheide	13,188	6.3
Total votes		206,801	100.0
Republican hold			

== District 46 ==
2010 California's 46th congressional district election
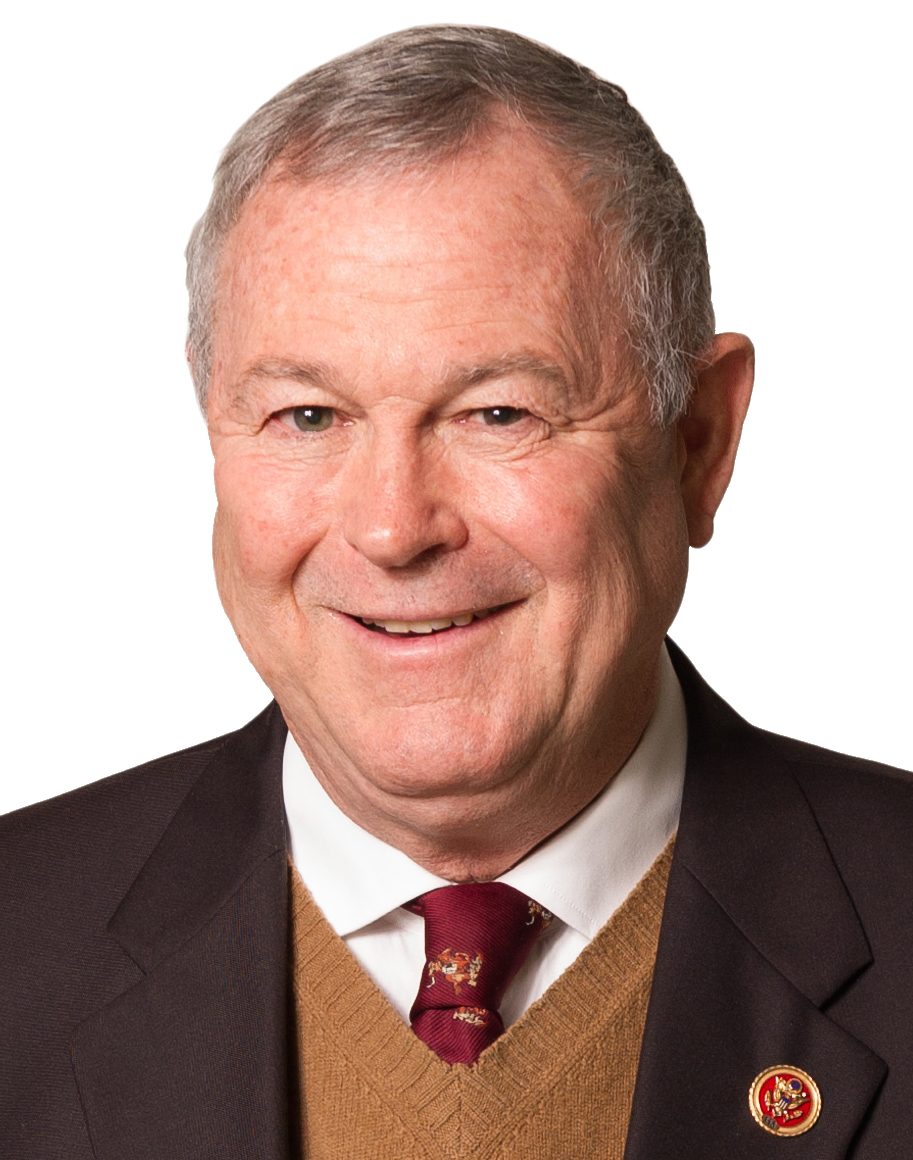

Nominee	Dana Rohrabacher	Ken Arnold
Party	Republican	Democratic
Popular vote	139,822	84,940
Percentage	62.3%	37.7%
- County results Rohrabacher: 50–60% 60–70%
U.S. Representative before election
Dana Rohrabacher
Republican
Elected U.S. Representative
Dana Rohrabacher
Republican

California's 46th congressional district (map) has been represented by Republican Dana Rohrabacher of Huntington Beach since January 3, 2003, when he was redistricted from the 45th district.

- Race ranking and details from CQ Politics
- Campaign contributions from OpenSecrets
- Race profile at The New York Times

=== Predictions ===
Source	Ranking	As of
The Cook Political Report	Safe R	November 1, 2010
Rothenberg	Safe R	November 1, 2010
Sabato's Crystal Ball	Safe R	November 1, 2010
RCP	Safe R	November 1, 2010
CQ Politics	Safe R	October 28, 2010
New York Times	Safe R	November 1, 2010
FiveThirtyEight	Safe R	November 1, 2010

California's 46th congressional district election, 2010
Party	Candidate	Votes	%
Republican	Dana Rohrabacher (incumbent)	139,822	62.3
Democratic	Ken Arnold	84,940	37.7
Democratic	Jay Shah (write-in)	20	0.0
Total votes		224,782	100.0
Republican hold			

== District 47 ==
2010 California's 47th congressional district election
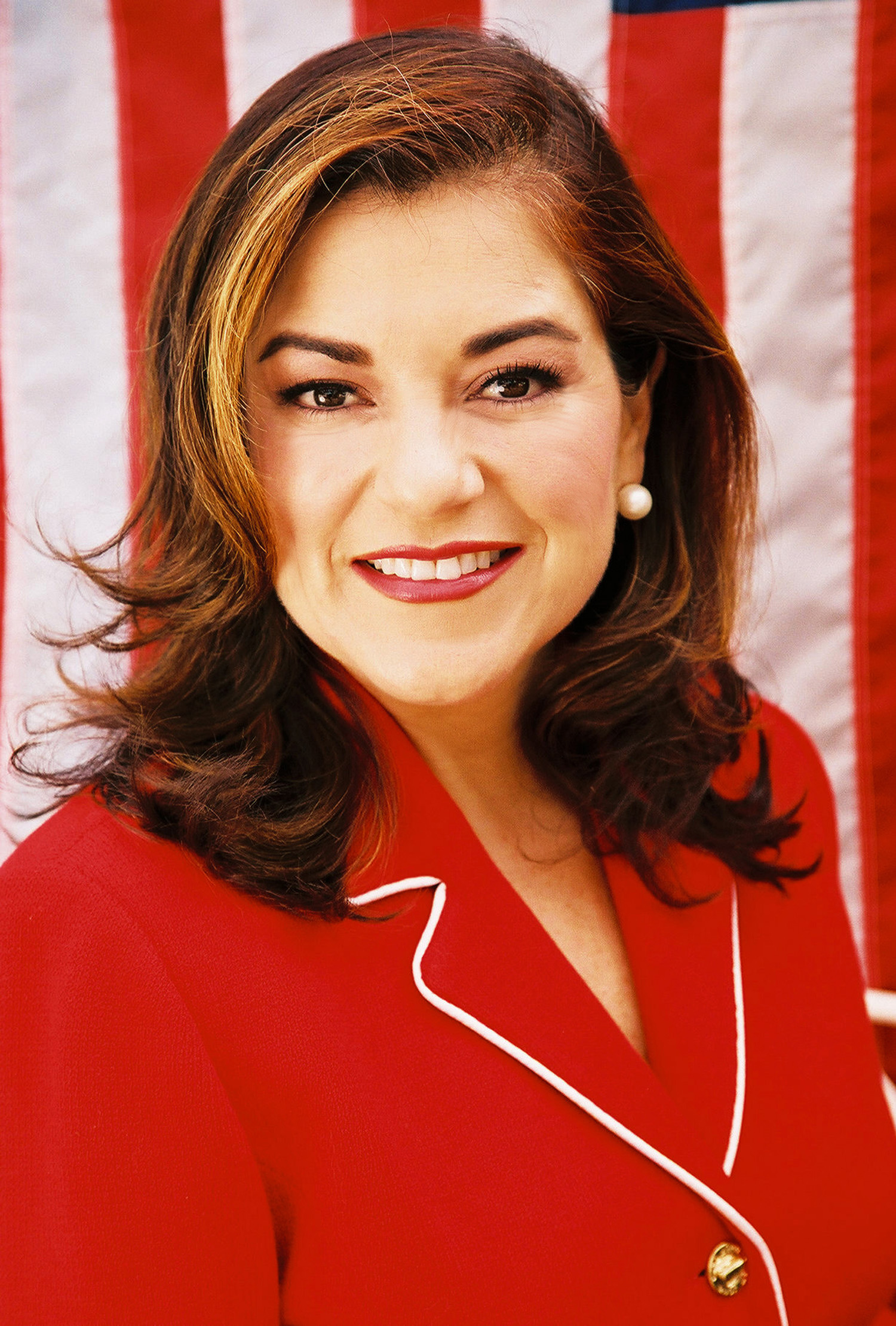

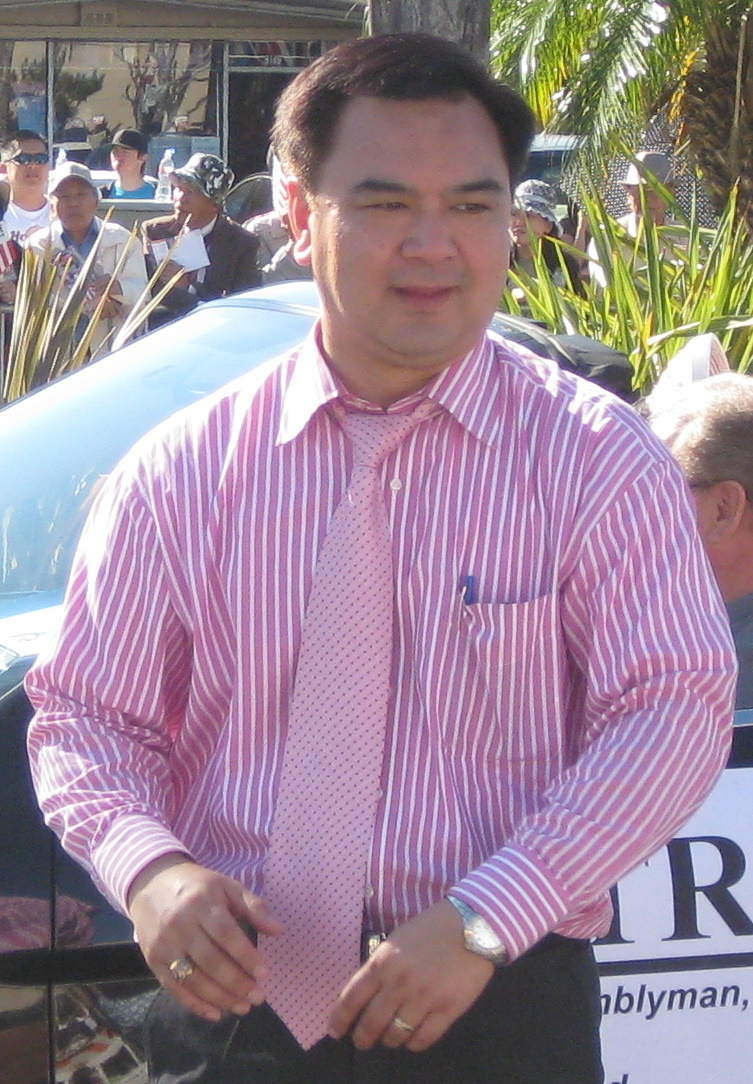

Nominee	Loretta Sanchez	Van Tran	Ceci Iglesias
Party	Democratic	Republican	Independent
Popular vote	50,832	37,679	7,443
Percentage	53.0%	39.3%	7.7%
- County results Sanchez: 50–60%
U.S. Representative before election
Loretta Sanchez
Democratic
Elected U.S. Representative
Loretta Sanchez
Democratic

California's 47th congressional district (map) has been represented by Democrat Loretta Sanchez of Anaheim since January 3, 2003, when she was redistricted from the 46th district.

- Race ranking and details from CQ Politics
- Campaign contributions from OpenSecrets
- Race profile at The New York Times

=== Predictions ===
Source	Ranking	As of
The Cook Political Report	Lean D	November 1, 2010
Rothenberg	Lean D	November 1, 2010
Sabato's Crystal Ball	Likely D	November 1, 2010
RCP	Lean D	November 1, 2010
CQ Politics	Lean D	October 28, 2010
New York Times	Lean D	November 1, 2010
FiveThirtyEight	Likely D	November 1, 2010

California's 47th congressional district election, 2010
Party	Candidate	Votes	%
Democratic	Loretta Sanchez (incumbent)	50,832	53.0
Republican	Van Tran	37,679	39.3
Independent	Ceci Iglesias	7,443	7.7
Total votes		95,954	100.0
Democratic hold			

== District 48 ==
2010 California's 48th congressional district election
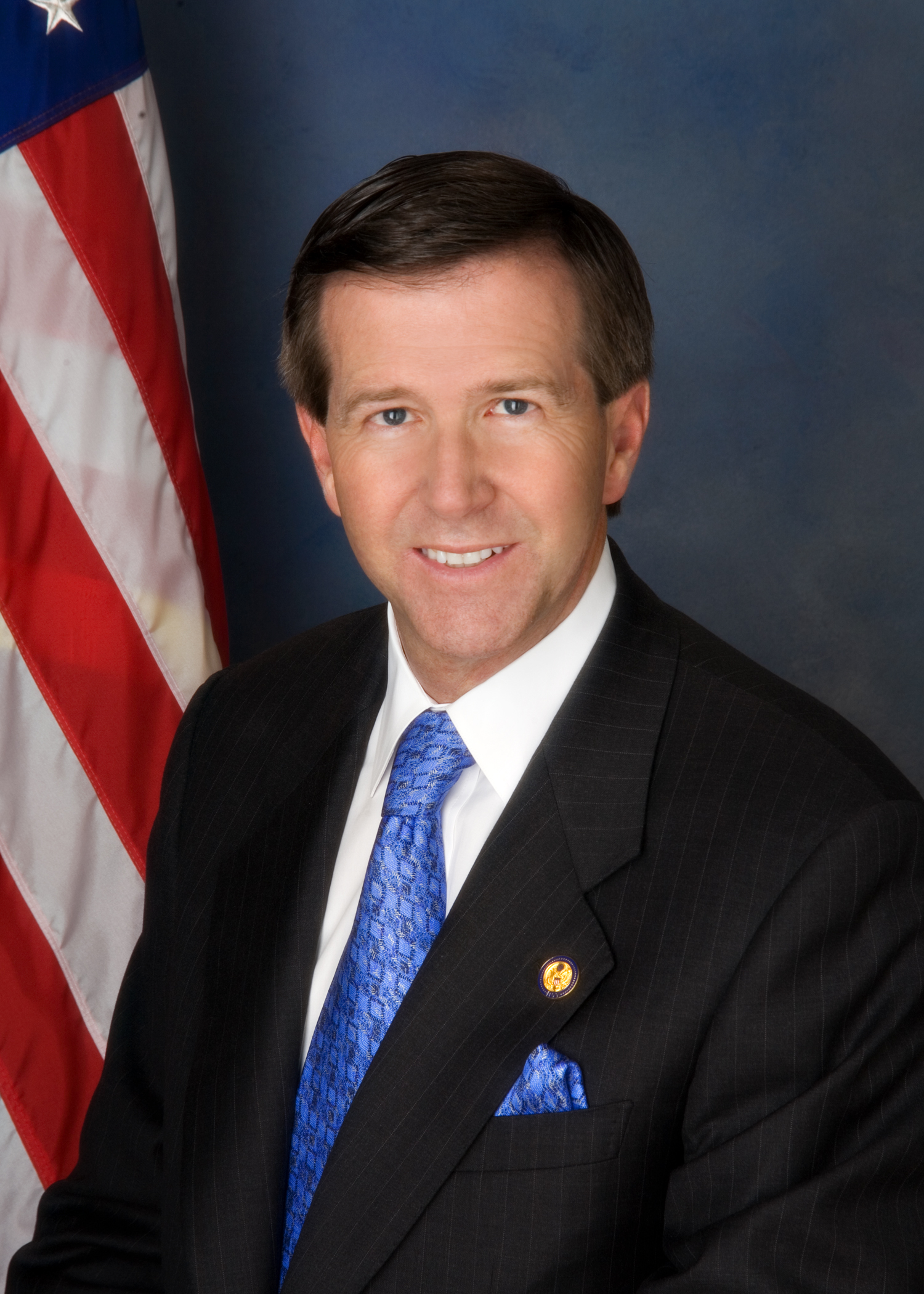

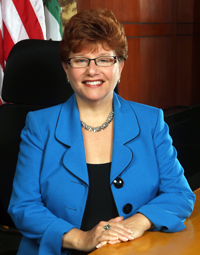
Nominee	John Campbell	Beth Krom
Party	Republican	Democratic
Popular vote	145,481	88,465
Percentage	60.0%	36.4%
- County results Campbell: 50–60%
U.S. Representative before election
John Campbell
Republican
Elected U.S. Representative
John Campbell
Republican

California's 48th congressional district (map) has been represented by Republican John Campbell of Irvine since January 3, 2005.

- Race ranking and details from CQ Politics
- Campaign contributions from OpenSecrets
- Race profile at The New York Times

=== Predictions ===
Source	Ranking	As of
The Cook Political Report	Safe R	November 1, 2010
Rothenberg	Safe R	November 1, 2010
Sabato's Crystal Ball	Safe R	November 1, 2010
RCP	Safe R	November 1, 2010
CQ Politics	Safe R	October 28, 2010
New York Times	Safe R	November 1, 2010
FiveThirtyEight	Safe R	November 1, 2010

California's 48th congressional district election, 2010
Party	Candidate	Votes	%
Republican	John Campbell (incumbent)	145,481	60.0
Democratic	Beth Krom	88,465	36.4
Libertarian	Mike Binkley	8,773	3.6
Total votes		242,719	100.0
Republican hold			

== District 49 ==
2010 California's 49th congressional district election
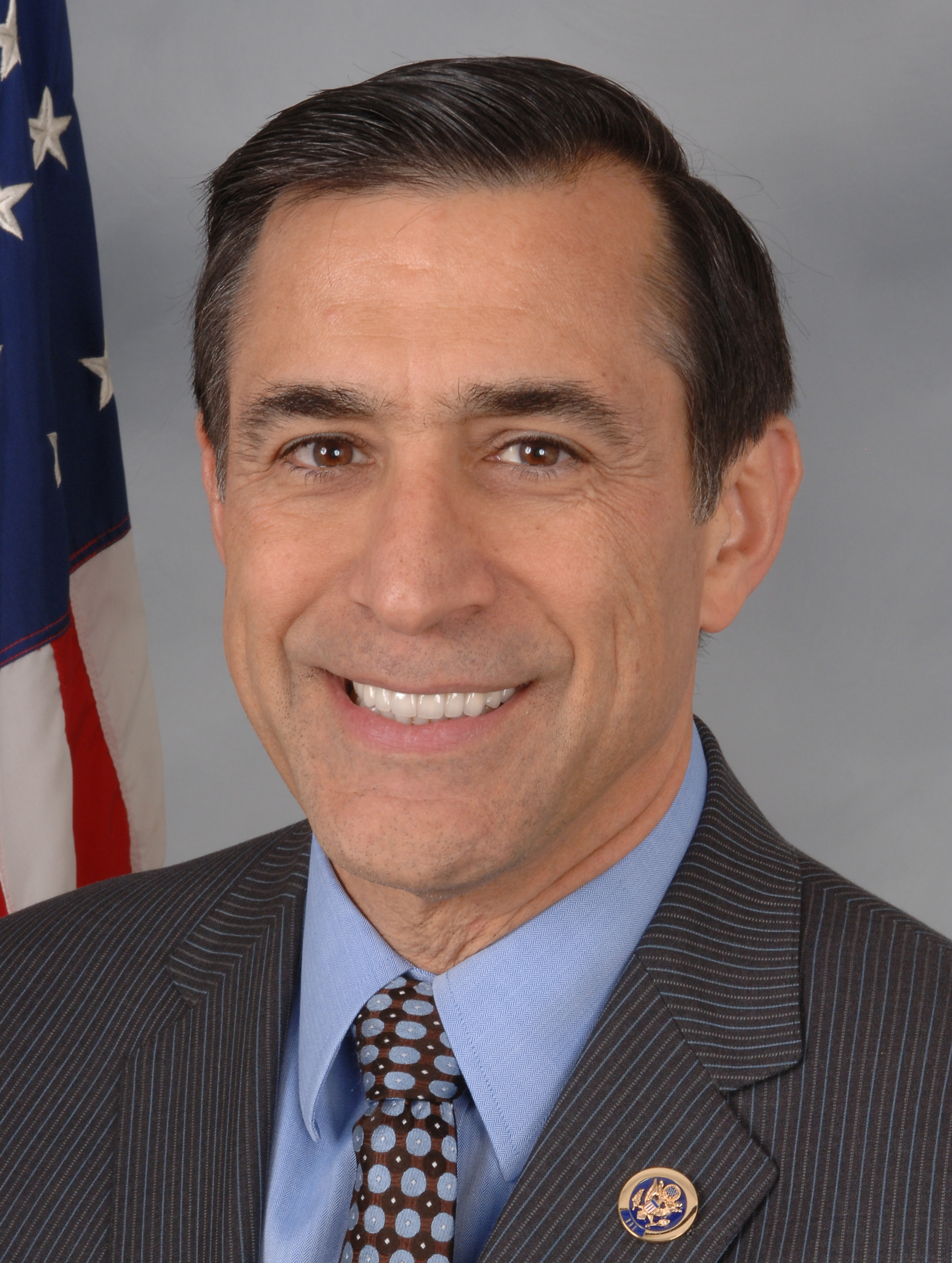

Nominee	Darrell Issa	Howard Katz
Party	Republican	Democratic
Popular vote	119,088	59,714
Percentage	62.8%	31.5%
- County results Issa: 60–70%
U.S. Representative before election
Darrell Issa
Republican
Elected U.S. Representative
Darrell Issa
Republican

California's 49th congressional district (map) has been represented by Republican Darrell Issa of Vista since January 3, 2003, when he was redistricted from the 48th district.

- Race ranking and details from CQ Politics
- Campaign contributions from OpenSecrets
- Race profile at The New York Times

=== Predictions ===
Source	Ranking	As of
The Cook Political Report	Safe R	November 1, 2010
Rothenberg	Safe R	November 1, 2010
Sabato's Crystal Ball	Safe R	November 1, 2010
RCP	Safe R	November 1, 2010
CQ Politics	Safe R	October 28, 2010
New York Times	Safe R	November 1, 2010
FiveThirtyEight	Safe R	November 1, 2010

California's 49th congressional district election, 2010
Party	Candidate	Votes	%
Republican	Darrell Issa (incumbent)	119,088	62.8
Democratic	Howard Katz	59,714	31.5
American Independent	Dion Clark	6,585	3.5
Libertarian	Mike Paster	4,290	2.2
Total votes		189,672	100.0
Republican hold			

== District 50 ==
2010 California's 50th congressional district election
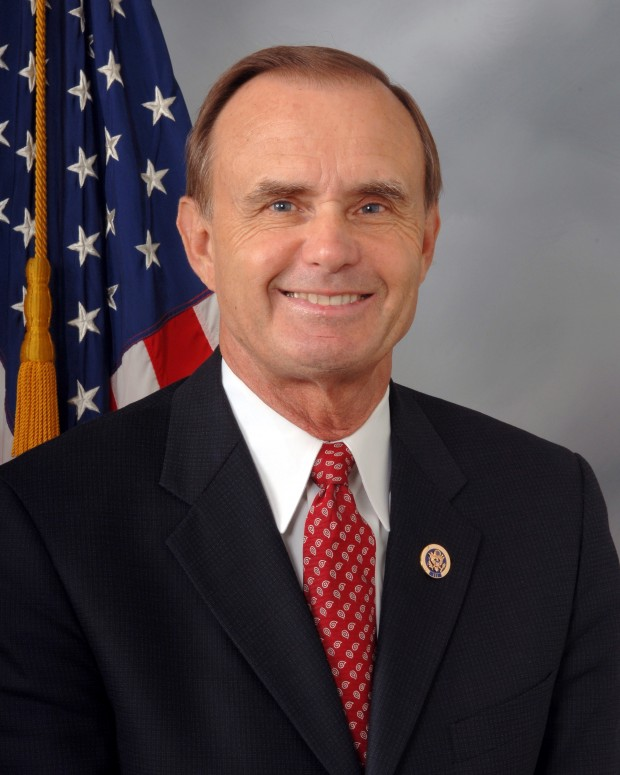

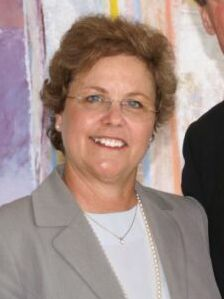
Nominee	Brian Bilbray	Francine Busby
Party	Republican	Democratic
Popular vote	142,247	97,818
Percentage	56.7%	39.0%
- County results Bilbray: 50–60%
U.S. Representative before election
Brian Bilbray
Republican
Elected U.S. Representative
Brian Bilbray
Republican

California's 50th congressional district (map) has been represented by Republican Brian Bilbray of Carlsbad since June 13, 2006.

- Race ranking and details from CQ Politics
- Campaign contributions from OpenSecrets
- Race profile at The New York Times

=== Predictions ===
Source	Ranking	As of
The Cook Political Report	Safe R	November 1, 2010
Rothenberg	Safe R	November 1, 2010
Sabato's Crystal Ball	Safe R	November 1, 2010
RCP	Safe R	November 1, 2010
CQ Politics	Safe R	October 28, 2010
New York Times	Safe R	November 1, 2010
FiveThirtyEight	Safe R	November 1, 2010

California's 50th congressional district election, 2010
Party	Candidate	Votes	%
Republican	Brian Bilbray (incumbent)	142,247	56.7
Democratic	Francine Busby	97,818	39.0
Libertarian	Lars Grossmith	5,546	2.2
Peace and Freedom	Miriam E. Clark	5,470	2.1
Total votes		251,081	100.0
Republican hold			

== District 51 ==
2010 California's 51st congressional district election
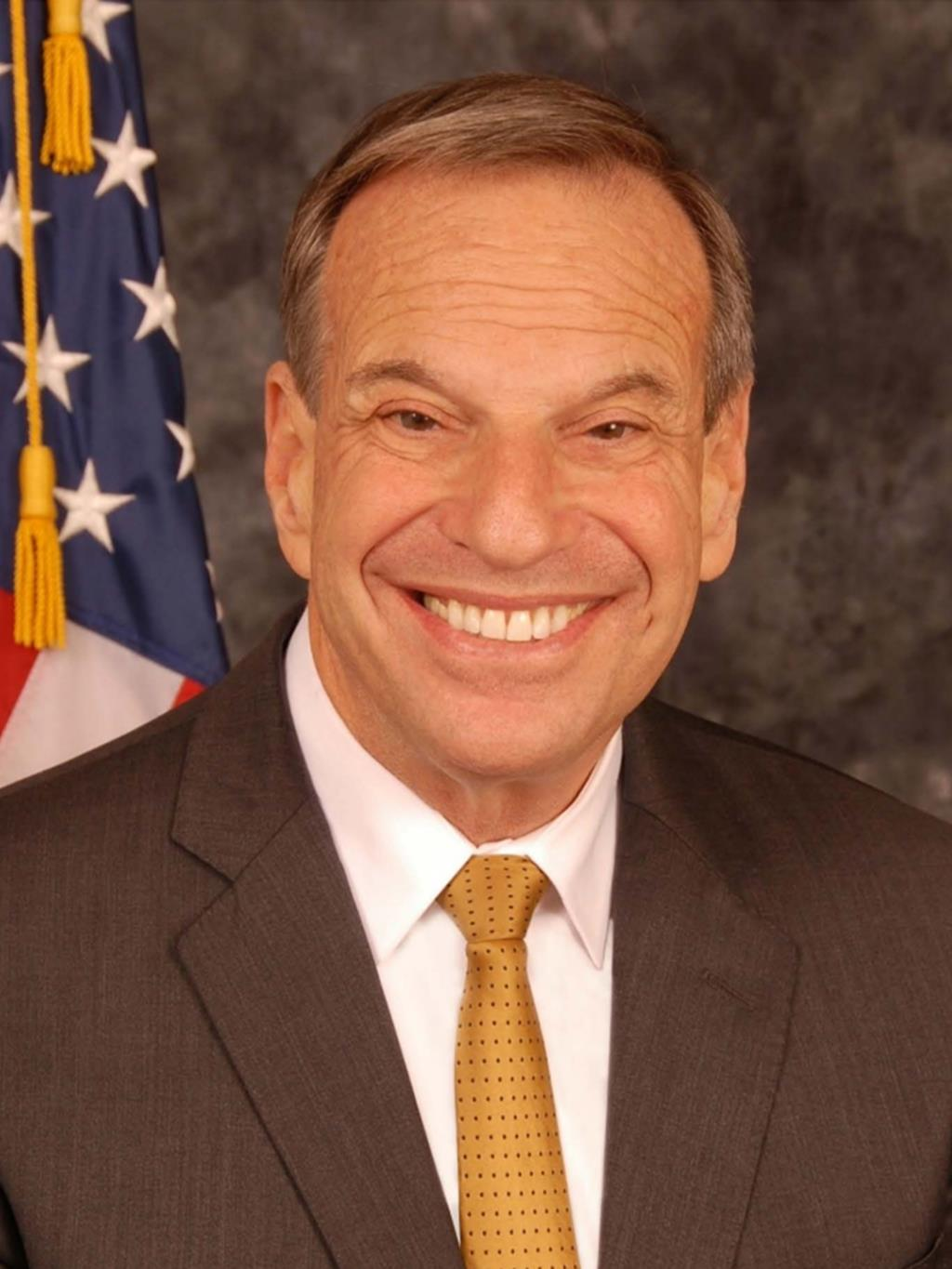

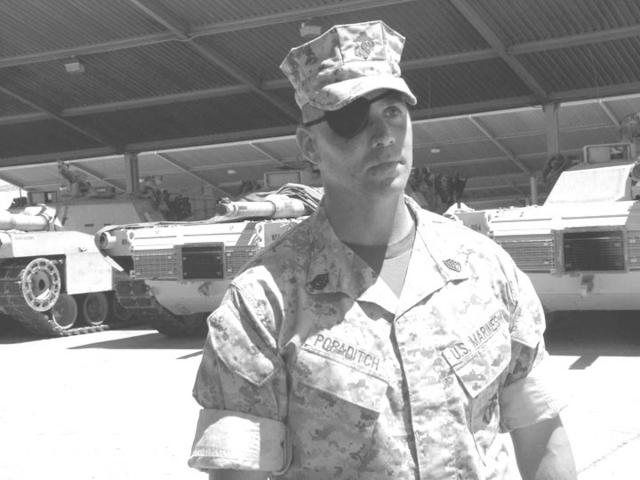
Nominee	Bob Filner	Nick Popaditch
Party	Democratic	Republican
Popular vote	86,423	57,488
Percentage	60.1%	39.9%
- County results Filner: 50–60% 60–70%
U.S. Representative before election
Bob Filner
Democratic
Elected U.S. Representative
Bob Filner
Democratic

California's 51st congressional district (map) has been represented by Democrat Bob Filner of San Diego since January 3, 2003, when he was redistricted from the 50th district.

- Race ranking and details from CQ Politics
- Campaign contributions from OpenSecrets
- Race profile at The New York Times

=== Predictions ===
Source	Ranking	As of
The Cook Political Report	Safe D	November 1, 2010
Rothenberg	Safe D	November 1, 2010
Sabato's Crystal Ball	Safe D	November 1, 2010
RCP	Safe D	November 1, 2010
CQ Politics	Safe D	October 28, 2010
New York Times	Safe D	November 1, 2010
FiveThirtyEight	Safe D	November 1, 2010

California's 51st congressional district election, 2010
Party	Candidate	Votes	%
Democratic	Bob Filner (incumbent)	86,423	60.1
Republican	Nick Popaditch	57,488	39.9
Independent	Marcus J. Shapiro (write-in)	5	0.0
Total votes		143,916	100.0
Democratic hold			

== District 52 ==
2010 California's 52nd congressional district election
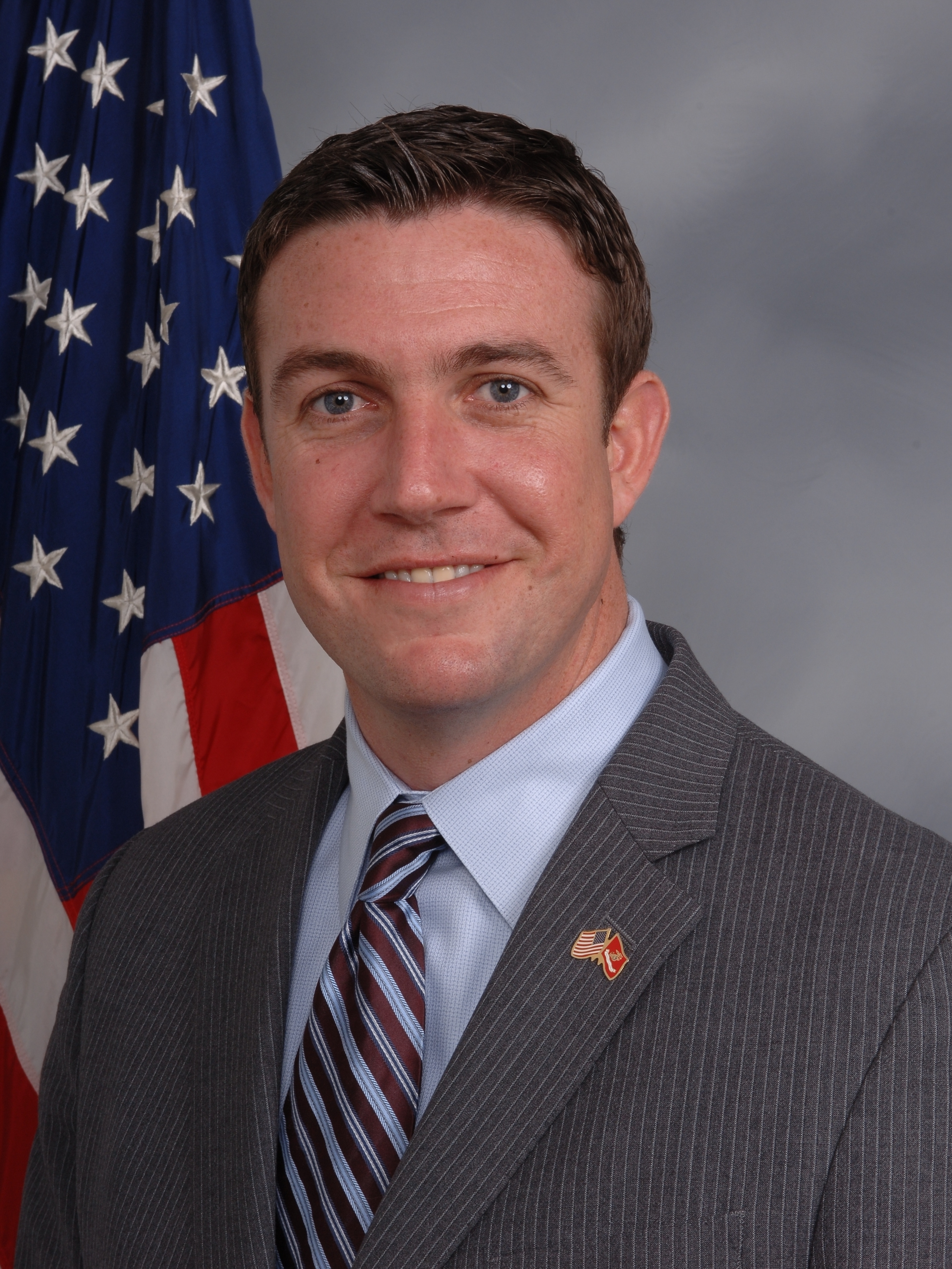

Nominee	Duncan D. Hunter	Ray Lutz
Party	Republican	Democratic
Popular vote	139,460	70,870
Percentage	63.1%	32.1%
- County results Hunter: 60–70%
U.S. Representative before election
Duncan D. Hunter
Republican
Elected U.S. Representative
Duncan D. Hunter
Republican

California's 52nd congressional district (map) has been represented by Republican Duncan D. Hunter of Lakeside since January 3, 2009.

- Race ranking and details from CQ Politics
- Campaign contributions from OpenSecrets
- Race profile at The New York Times

=== Predictions ===
Source	Ranking	As of
The Cook Political Report	Safe R	November 1, 2010
Rothenberg	Safe R	November 1, 2010
Sabato's Crystal Ball	Safe R	November 1, 2010
RCP	Safe R	November 1, 2010
CQ Politics	Safe R	October 28, 2010
New York Times	Safe R	November 1, 2010
FiveThirtyEight	Safe R	November 1, 2010

California's 52nd congressional district election, 2010
Party	Candidate	Votes	%
Republican	Duncan D. Hunter (incumbent)	139,460	63.1
Democratic	Ray Lutz	70,870	32.1
Libertarian	Michael Benoit	10,732	4.8
Total votes		221,061	100.0
Republican hold			

== District 53 ==
2010 California's 53rd congressional district election
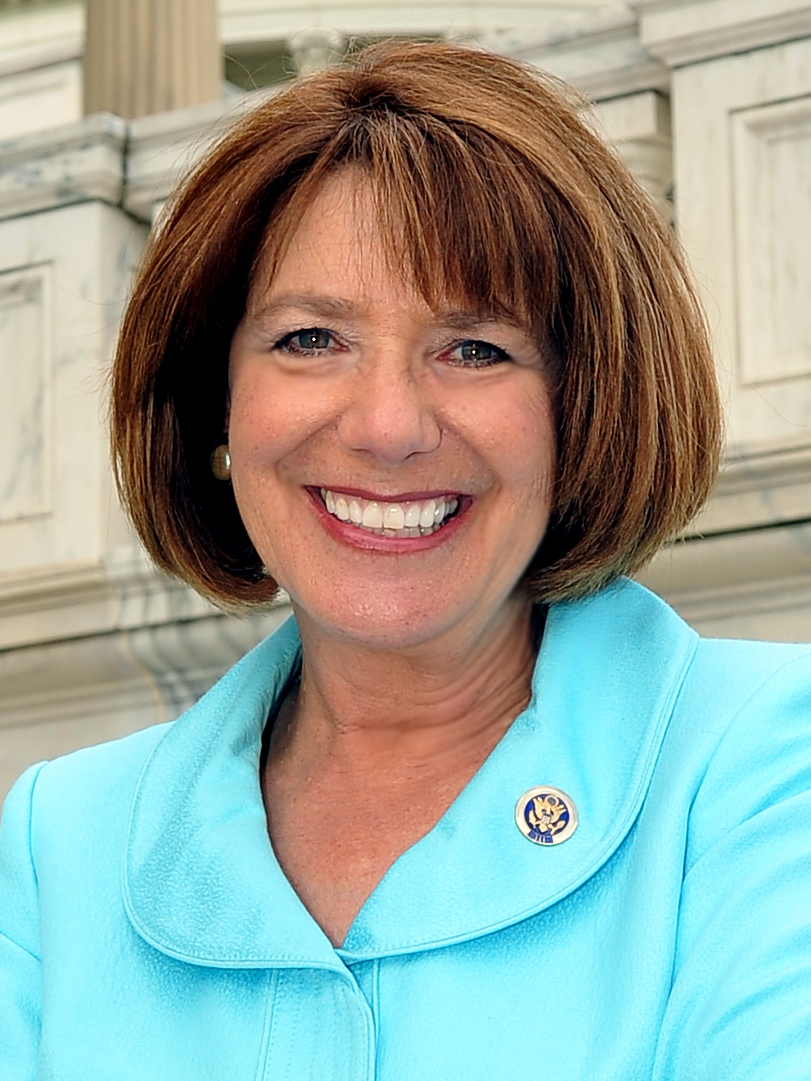

Nominee	Susan Davis	Michael Peter Crimmins
Party	Democratic	Republican
Popular vote	104,800	57,230
Percentage	62.3%	34.0%
- County results Davis: 60–70%
U.S. Representative before election
Susan Davis
Democratic
Elected U.S. Representative
Susan Davis
Democratic

California's 53rd congressional district (map) has been represented by Democrat Susan Davis of San Diego since January 3, 2003, when she was redistricted from the 49th district.

- Race ranking and details from CQ Politics
- Campaign contributions from OpenSecrets
- Race profile at The New York Times

=== Predictions ===
Source	Ranking	As of
The Cook Political Report	Safe D	November 1, 2010
Rothenberg	Safe D	November 1, 2010
Sabato's Crystal Ball	Safe D	November 1, 2010
RCP	Safe D	November 1, 2010
CQ Politics	Safe D	October 28, 2010
New York Times	Safe D	November 1, 2010
FiveThirtyEight	Safe D	November 1, 2010

California's 53rd congressional district election, 2010
Party	Candidate	Votes	%
Democratic	Susan Davis (incumbent)	104,800	62.3
Republican	Michael Peter Crimmins	57,230	34.0
Libertarian	Paul Michael-Dekker	6,298	3.7
Total votes		168,328	100.0
Democratic hold			
