= Members of the 110th United States Congress =

The One Hundred Tenth United States Congress was the meeting of the legislative branch of the United States federal government, between January 3, 2007, and January 3, 2009, during the last two years of the second term of President George W. Bush. It was composed of the Senate and the House of Representatives. The apportionment of seats in the House was based on the 2000 U.S. census.

The Democratic Party controlled a majority in both chambers for the first time since the end of the 103rd Congress in 1995. Although the Democrats held fewer than 50 Senate seats, they had an operational majority because the two independent senators caucused with the Democrats for organizational purposes. No Democratic-held seats had fallen to the Republican Party in the 2006 elections. Democrat Nancy Pelosi became the first woman Speaker of the House. The House also received the first Muslims and Buddhists in Congress.

== House of Representatives ==
=== Overview ===
Region	Democrats	Republicans	Vacant	Total	States as defined in the US Census
New England	21	1		22	CT, MA, ME, NH, RI, VT
Mid-Atlantic	47	23		70	DE, MD, NJ, NY, PA
Midwest	34	35		69	MI, IL, IN, OH, WI
Great Plains	16	15		31	IA, KS, MN, MO, ND, NE, SD
South Atlantic	29	41	1	71	FL, GA, NC, SC, VA, WV
South Central	32	42		74	AL, AR, KY, LA, MS, OK, TN, TX
Mountain	11	17		28	AZ, CO, ID, MT, NM, NV, UT, WY
Pacific	46	24		70	AK, CA, HI, OR, WA
Total	236	198	1	435	

Partisan mix of the House by state
State ranked in partisan order	Percentage Democrats	Percentage Republicans	Democratic/ Republican	Democratic seat plurality
Massachusetts	100%	0%	10/0	10
Hawaii	100%	0%	2/0	2
Maine	100%	0%	2/0	2
New Hampshire	100%	0%	2/0	2
Rhode Island	100%	0%	2/0	2
North Dakota	100%	0%	1/0	1
South Dakota	100%	0%	1/0	1
Vermont	100%	0%	1/0	1
Connecticut	80%	20%	4/1	3
Oregon	80%	20%	4/1	3
New York	79%	21%	23/6	17
Maryland	75%	25%	6/2	4
Arkansas	75%	25%	3/1	2
Washington	67%	33%	6/3	3
West Virginia	67%	33%	2/1	1
California	64%	36%	34/19	15
Minnesota	63%	38%	5/3	2
Wisconsin	63%	38%	5/3	2
Iowa	60%	40%	3/2	1
Pennsylvania	58%	42%	11/8	3
Colorado	57%	43%	4/3	1
Indiana	56%	44%	5/4	1
Tennessee	56%	44%	5/4	1
New Jersey	54%	46%	7/6	1
North Carolina	54%	46%	7/6	1
United States	54%	46%	233/202	31
Illinois	53%	47%	10/9	1
Arizona	50%	50%	4/4	0
Kansas	50%	50%	2/2	0
Mississippi	50%	50%	2/2	0
Georgia	46%	54%	6/7	-1
Missouri	44%	56%	4/5	-1
Texas	41%	59%	13/19	-5
Michigan	40%	60%	6/9	-3
Ohio	39%	61%	7/11	-4
Florida	36%	64%	9/16	-7
Nevada	33%	67%	1/2	-1
New Mexico	33%	67%	1/2	-1
Utah	33%	67%	1/2	-1
Kentucky	33%	67%	2/4	-2
South Carolina	33%	67%	2/4	-2
Alabama	29%	71%	2/5	-3
Louisiana	29%	71%	2/5	-3
Virginia	27%	73%	3/8	-5
Oklahoma	20%	80%	1/4	-3
Alaska	0%	100%	0/1	-1
Delaware	0%	100%	0/1	-1
Montana	0%	100%	0/1	-1
Wyoming	0%	100%	0/1	-1
Idaho	0%	100%	0/2	-2
Nebraska	0%	100%	0/3	-3
State ranked in partisan order	Percentage Democrats	Percentage Republicans	Democratic/ Republican	Democratic seat plurality

=== Voting members by state ===
District	Name	Party	Religion	Prior experience	Education	Assumed office	Born in
Alabama 1	Bonner, Jo	Republican	Episcopalian	congressional aide	University of Alabama	2003	1959
Alabama 2	Everett, Terry	Republican	Baptist	journalist, newspaper publisher	Enterprise State Junior College (attended)	1993	1937
Alabama 3	Rogers, Mike	Republican	Baptist	Calhoun County Commissioner, State House of Representatives	Jacksonville State University, Birmingham School of Law	2003	1958
Alabama 4	Aderholt, Robert	Republican	Congregationalist	Haleyville Municipal Judge	Birmingham–Southern, Samford, Cumberland School of Law	1997	1965
Alabama 5	Cramer, Bud	Democratic	Methodist	Madison County District Attorney	University of Alabama	1991	1947
Alabama 6	Bachus, Spencer	Republican	Baptist	state Republican Party chairman	Auburn University, University of Alabama School of Law	1993	1947
Alabama 7	Davis, Artur	Democratic	Lutheran	Assistant U.S. Attorney	Harvard University; Harvard Law School	2003	1967
Alaska At Large	Young, Don	Republican	Episcopalian	State Senate, ship captain, mayor of Fort Yukon	California State University, Chico	1973*	1933
Arizona 1	Renzi, Rick	Republican	Roman Catholic	insurance executive	Northern Arizona University, Columbus School of Law (Catholic University of America)	2003	1958
Arizona 2	Franks, Trent	Republican	Baptist	non-profit program manager, policy consultant	Ottawa (attended)	2003	1957
Arizona 3	Shadegg, John	Republican	Episcopalian	lawyer	Arizona	1995	1949
Arizona 4	Pastor, Ed	Democratic	Roman Catholic	Maricopa County Board of Supervisors, Teacher	Arizona State, Arizona	1991*	1943
Arizona 5	Mitchell, Harry	Democratic	Roman Catholic	Mayor of Tempe, State Senate	Arizona State	2007	1947
Arizona 6	Flake, Jeff	Republican	LDS	non-profit program manager	Brigham Young	2001	1962
Arizona 7	Grijalva, Raúl	Democratic	Roman Catholic	Pima County Board of Supervisors	Arizona	2003	1948
Arizona 8	Giffords, Gabrielle	Democratic	Jewish	State Senate	Scripps, Cornell	2007	1970
Arkansas 1	Berry, Marion	Democratic	Methodist	pharmacist, farmer	Arkansas	1997	1942
Arkansas 2	Snyder, Vic	Democratic	Methodist	physician, State Senate	Willamette, Oregon, Arkansas	1997	1947
Arkansas 3	Boozman, John	Republican	Baptist	optometrist	Southern College of Optometry, Arkansas	2001	1950
Arkansas 4	Ross, Mike	Democratic	Methodist	financial executive, State Senate	Arkansas	2001	1961
California 1	Thompson, Mike	Democratic	Roman Catholic	military, State Senate	Chico State	1999	1951
California 2	Herger, Wally	Republican	LDS	State Assembly	California State University, Sacramento (attended)	1987	1945
California 3	Lungren, Dan	Republican	Roman Catholic	State Attorney General	Notre Dame, Georgetown	2005	1946
California 4	Doolittle, John	Republican	LDS	State Senate	University of California, Santa Cruz, McGeorge School of Law	1991	1950
California 5	Matsui, Doris	Democratic	Methodist	law firm director	University of California, Berkeley	2005*	1944
California 6	Woolsey, Lynn	Democratic	Presbyterian	Petaluma City Council member, Teacher	University of Washington, University of San Francisco	1993	1937
California 7	Miller, George	Democratic	Roman Catholic	State Senate	San Francisco State University, University of California, Davis	1975	1945
California 8	Pelosi, Nancy	Democratic	Roman Catholic	San Francisco Board of Supervisors	Trinity Washington University	1987	1940
California 9	Lee, Barbara	Democratic	Baptist	State Senate	Mills College, University of California, Berkeley	1998*	1946
California 10	Tauscher, Ellen	Democratic	Roman Catholic	investment banker	Seton Hall University	1997	1951
California 11	McNerney, Jerry	Democratic	Roman Catholic	engineering executive	University of New Mexico	2007	1951
California 12	Speier, Jackie^{[L]}	Democratic	Roman Catholic	California State Senator	UC Davis, UC Law	2008	1950
California 13	Stark, Pete	Democratic	Atheist	Banking executive	Massachusetts Institute of Technology, University of California, Berkeley	1973	1931
California 14	Eshoo, Anna	Democratic	Roman Catholic	San Mateo County Board of Supervisors	Cañada College, Menlo College	1993	1942
California 15	Honda, Mike	Democratic	Protestant	Santa Clara County Board of Supervisors, State Assembly	San Jose State University	2001	1941
California 16	Lofgren, Zoe	Democratic	Christian	Santa Clara County Board of Supervisors	Stanford University, Santa Clara University	1995	1947
California 17	Farr, Sam	Democratic	Episcopalian	State Assembly	Willamette University, Santa Clara University, Monterey Institute of International Studies	1993	1941
California 18	Cardoza, Dennis	Democratic	Roman Catholic	State Assembly	University of Maryland, College Park	2003	1959
California 19	Radanovich, George	Republican	Roman Catholic	Mariposa County Board of Supervisors	California Polytechnic State University	1995	1955
California 20	Costa, Jim	Democratic	Roman Catholic	State Assembly	Fresno State University	2005	1952
California 21	Nunes, Devin	Republican	Roman Catholic	Director of Rural Development with the United States Department of Agriculture	College of the Sequoias, California Polytechnic State University, San Luis Obispo	2003	1973
California 22	McCarthy, Kevin	Republican	Baptist	State Assembly	California State University, Bakersfield	2007	1965
California 23	Capps, Lois	Democratic	Lutheran	nurse, teacher	Pacific Lutheran University, Yale University, University of California, Santa Barbara	1998*	1938
California 24	Gallegly, Elton	Republican	Protestant	Simi Valley City Council Member	Huntington Park High School	1987	1944
California 25	McKeon, Howard	Republican	LDS	Mayor of Santa Clarita, Santa Clarita City Council Member	Brigham Young University	1993	1938
California 26	Dreier, David	Republican	Christian Scientist	director of corporate relations	Claremont McKenna College, Claremont Graduate University	1981	1952
California 27	Sherman, Brad	Democratic	Jewish	lawyer, accountant	University of California, Los Angeles, Harvard Law School	1997	1954
California 28	Berman, Howard	Democratic	Jewish	State Assembly	University of California, Los Angeles	1983	1941
California 29	Schiff, Adam	Democratic	Jewish	State Senate	Stanford University, Harvard University	2001	1960
California 30	Waxman, Henry	Democratic	Jewish	State Assembly	University of California, Los Angeles	1975	1939
California 31	Becerra, Xavier	Democratic	Roman Catholic	State Assembly	Stanford University	1993	1958
California 32	Solis, Hilda	Democratic	Roman Catholic	State Senate	California State Polytechnic University, Pomona, University of Southern California	2001	1957
California 33	Watson, Diane	Democratic	Roman Catholic	U.S. Ambassador to Micronesia	University of California, Los Angeles; Claremont Graduate University	2001	1933
California 34	Roybal-Allard, Lucille	Democratic	Roman Catholic	public relations executive	California State University, Los Angeles	1993	1941
California 35	Waters, Maxine	Democratic	Christian	State Assembly	California State University, Los Angeles	1991	1938
California 36	Harman, Jane	Democratic	Jewish	professor of public policy	Smith College, Harvard Law School	2001	1945
California 37	Richardson, Laura^{[B]}	Democratic	Methodist	Long Beach City Council and assistant speaker pro tempore of the California State Assembly	University of California, Los Angeles	2007	1962
California 38	Napolitano, Grace	Democratic	Roman Catholic	State Assembly	Texas Southmost College	1999	1936
California 39	Sánchez, Linda	Democratic	Roman Catholic	attorney	University of California, Berkeley, University of California, Los Angeles	2003	1969
California 40	Royce, Ed	Republican	Roman Catholic	State Senate	California State University, Fullerton	1993	1951
California 41	Lewis, Jerry	Republican	Presbyterian	State Assembly	University of California, Los Angeles	1979	1934
California 42	Miller, Gary	Republican	Protestant	State Assembly	Mount San Antonio College	1999	1948
California 43	Baca, Joe	Democratic	Roman Catholic	State Senate	University of California, Los Angeles	1999	1947
California 44	Calvert, Ken	Republican	Protestant	real estate executive	Chaffey College, San Diego State University	1993	1953
California 45	Bono Mack, Mary	Republican	Protestant	congressional aide	University of Southern California	1998	1961
California 46	Rohrabacher, Dana	Republican	Baptist	special assistant to Ronald Reagan	California State University, Long Beach, University of Southern California	1989	1947
California 47	Sanchez, Loretta	Democratic	Roman Catholic	financial analyst	Chapman University, American University	1997	1960
California 48	Campbell, John	Republican	Presbyterian	State Assembly	University of California, Los Angeles, University of Southern California	2005	1955
California 49	Issa, Darrell	Republican	Protestant	electronics executive	Kent State University Stark, Siena Heights College	2001	1953
California 50	Bilbray, Brian	Republican	Roman Catholic	U.S. House, lobbyist	Southwestern College	2006	1951
California 51	Filner, Bob	Democratic	Jewish	congressional aide	San Diego State University	1993	1942
California 52	Hunter, Duncan	Republican	Baptist	attorney	Western State University College of Law	1981	1946
California 53	Davis, Susan	Democratic	Jewish	State Assembly	University of California, Berkeley, University of North Carolina at Chapel Hill	2001	1944
Colorado 1	DeGette, Diana	Democratic	Presbyterian	State House of Representatives	Colorado College	1997	1957
Colorado 2	Udall, Mark	Democratic	Unspecified	State House of Representatives	Williams College	1999	1950
Colorado 3	Salazar, John	Democratic	Roman Catholic	State House of Representatives	U.S. Military Academy	2005	1953
Colorado 4	Musgrave, Marilyn	Republican	Assembly of God	State House of Representatives	Colorado State University	2003	1949
Colorado 5	Lamborn, Doug	Republican	Christian	State Senate	University of Kansas	2007	1954
Colorado 6	Tancredo, Thomas	Republican	Presbyterian	State House of Representatives	University of Northern Colorado	1999	1945
Colorado 7	Perlmutter, Ed	Democratic	Protestant	State Senate	University of Colorado	2007	1953
Connecticut 1	Larson, John	Democratic	Roman Catholic	State Senate	Central Connecticut State University	1999	1948
Connecticut 2	Courtney, Joe	Democratic	Roman Catholic	State House of Representatives	Tufts University	2007	1953
Connecticut 3	DeLauro, Rosa	Democratic	Roman Catholic	EMILY's List director	Marymount College	1991	1943
Connecticut 4	Shays, Chris	Republican	Christian Scientist	State House of Representatives	New York University	1987	1945
Connecticut 5	Murphy, Chris	Democratic	Protestant	Connecticut House of Representatives, State Senate	Williams College	2007	1973
Delaware At Large	Castle, Michael	Republican	Roman Catholic	Delaware General Assembly, Governor	Hamilton College, Georgetown	1993	1939
Florida 1	Miller, Jeff	Republican	Methodist	real estate broker, deputy sheriff	University of Florida	2001	1959
Florida 2	Boyd, Allen	Democratic	Methodist	State House of Representatives	Florida State University	1997	1945
Florida 3	Brown, Corrine	Democratic	Baptist	State House of Representatives	Florida A&M University	1993	1946
Florida 4	Crenshaw, Ander	Republican	Episcopalian	Florida House of Representatives, State Senate	University of Georgia, University of Florida	2001	1944
Florida 5	Brown-Waite, Ginny	Republican	Roman Catholic	Hernando County Commissioner, President Pro Tem of the Florida State Senate	State University of New York at Albany	2003	1943
Florida 6	Stearns, Cliff	Republican	Presbyterian	military	George Washington University, University of California at Los Angeles	1989	1941
Florida 7	Mica, John	Republican	Episcopalian	State House of Representatives	University of Florida	1993	1943
Florida 8	Keller, Ric	Republican	Methodist	attorney	Vanderbilt University	2001	1964
Florida 9	Bilirakis, Gus	Republican	Eastern Orthodox	lawyer, State House of Representatives	University of Florida	2007	1963
Florida 10	Young, Bill	Republican	Methodist	State Senate	Army National Guard	1971	1930
Florida 11	Castor, Kathy	Democratic	Presbyterian	Assistant General Counsel to the Florida Department of Community Affairs, President of the Florida Association of Women Lawyers, Hillsborough County Board of Commissioners	Emory University	2007	1966
Florida 12	Putnam, Adam	Republican	Episcopalian	State House of Representatives	University of Florida	2001	1974
Florida 13	Buchanan, Vern	Republican	Baptist	auto dealer	Cleary University	2007	1951
Florida 14	Mack, Connie	Republican	Roman Catholic	State House of Representatives	University of Florida	2005	1967
Florida 15	Weldon, Dave	Republican	Christian	military	State University of New York	1995	1953
Florida 16	Mahoney, Tim	Democratic	Methodist	COO of asset management company	West Virginia University, George Washington University	2007	1956
Florida 17	Meek, Kendrick	Democratic	Baptist	State Senate	Florida A&M University	2003	1966
Florida 18	Ros-Lehtinen, Ileana	Republican	Episcopalian	Florida House of Representatives, State Senate	Florida International University, University of Miami	1989	1952
Florida 19	Wexler, Robert	Democratic	Jewish	Florida House of Representatives; State Senate	University of Florida	1997	1961
Florida 20	Wasserman Schultz, Debbie	Democratic	Jewish	State Senate	University of Florida	2005	1966
Florida 21	Diaz-Balart, Lincoln	Republican	Roman Catholic	lawyer	New College of Florida	1993	1954
Florida 22	Klein, Ron	Democratic	Jewish	lawyer, State House of Representatives	Ohio State University, Case Western Reserve University School of Law	2007	1957
Florida 23	Hastings, Alcee	Democratic	AME	lawyer, District Court judge	Fisk University	1993	1936
Florida 24	Feeney, Tom	Republican	Presbyterian	lawyer; State House of Representatives	Penn State; Pitt Law	2003	1958
Florida 25	Diaz-Balart, Mario	Republican	Roman Catholic	aide to Miami Mayor Xavier Suarez; State House of Representatives	South Florida	2003	1961
Georgia 1	Kingston, Jack	Republican	Episcopalian	agribusiness, insurance executive	University of Georgia	1993	1955
Georgia 2	Bishop, Sanford	Democratic	Baptist	State Senate	Morehouse College	1993	1947
Georgia 3	Westmoreland, Lynn	Republican	Baptist	State House of Representatives	Georgia State University (attended)	2003	1950
Georgia 4	Johnson, Hank	Democratic	Buddhist	lawyer, DeKalb County Commission	Clark Atlanta University	2007	1954
Georgia 5	Lewis, John	Democratic	Baptist	Atlanta City Council	American Baptist Theological Seminary	1987	1940
Georgia 6	Price, Tom	Republican	Presbyterian	State Senate	University of Michigan	2005	1954
Georgia 7	Linder, John	Republican	Presbyterian	State House of Representatives	University of Minnesota	1993	1942
Georgia 8	Marshall, Jim	Democratic	Roman Catholic	Mayor of Macon	Princeton University, Boston University	2005	1948
Georgia 9	Deal, Nathan	Republican	Baptist	State Senate	Mercer University	1993	1942
Georgia 10	Broun, Paul^{[C]}	Republican	Baptist	physician	University of Georgia, Medical College of Georgia	2007	1946
Georgia 11	Gingrey, Phil	Republican	Roman Catholic	State Senate	Medical College of Georgia	2003	1942
Georgia 12	Barrow, John	Democratic	Baptist	Athens–Clarke County city/county commissioner	University of Georgia	2005	1955
Georgia 13	Scott, David	Democratic	Baptist	State Senate	Florida A&M University	2003	1946
Hawaii 1	Abercrombie, Neil	Democratic	Non-Affiliated	Honolulu City Council; State Senate	Union College, University of Hawaii	1991	1938
Hawaii 2	Hirono, Mazie	Democratic	Buddhist	Hawaii House of Representatives, Lieutenant Governor	University of Hawaii, Georgetown	2007	1947
Idaho 1	Sali, Bill	Republican	Evangelical	State House of Representatives	University of Idaho	2007	1954
Idaho 2	Simpson, Mike	Republican	LDS	dentist, Blackfoot City Council, Speaker of the Idaho House of Representatives	Utah State University	1999	1950
Illinois 1	Rush, Bobby	Democratic	Protestant	Chicago City Council, insurance agent	Roosevelt University, University of Illinois, McCormick Theological Seminary	1993	1946
Illinois 2	Jackson Jr., Jesse	Democratic	Baptist	community organizer	North Carolina A & T State University, Chicago Theological Seminary, University of Illinois	1995	1965
Illinois 3	Lipinski, Dan	Democratic	Roman Catholic	college professor	Northwestern, Stanford, Duke	2005	1966
Illinois 4	Gutierrez, Luis	Democratic	Roman Catholic	Chicago City Council, teacher, social worker	Northeastern Illinois University	1993	1953
Illinois 5	Emanuel, Rahm	Democratic	Jewish	investment banker	Sarah Lawrence College, Northwestern	2003	1959
Illinois 6	Roskam, Peter	Republican	Anglican	State Senate	University of Illinois, Chicago Kent College of Law	2007	1961
Illinois 7	Davis, Danny	Democratic	Baptist	Chicago City Council, Cook County Board of Commissioners	Arkansas AM & N, Chicago State, Union Institute and University	1997	1941
Illinois 8	Bean, Melissa	Democratic	Eastern Orthodox	consulting firm director	Roosevelt University	2005	1962
Illinois 9	Schakowsky, Jan	Democratic	Jewish	State House of Representatives	University of Illinois	1999	1944
Illinois 10	Kirk, Mark	Republican	Congregationalist	Counsel to House International Relations Committee	Cornell University, London School of Economics, Georgetown, Universidad Nacional Autónoma de México (attended)	2001	1959
Illinois 11	Weller, Jerry	Republican	Christian	State House of Representatives	University of Illinois	1995	1957
Illinois 12	Costello, Jerry	Democratic	Roman Catholic	chief investigator, Illinois State Attorney's office	Maryville College of the Sacred Heart	1988*	1949
Illinois 13	Biggert, Judy	Republican	Episcopalian	State House of Representatives	Stanford, Northwestern	1999	1937
Illinois 14	Foster, Bill^{[D]}	Democratic		Fermi National Accelerator Laboratory	University of Wisconsin–Madison, Harvard University	2008	1955
Illinois 15	Johnson, Tim	Republican	Assembly of God	Urbana City Council, Illinois House of Representatives attorney	West Point, Illinois, University of Illinois College of Law	2001	1946
Illinois 16	Manzullo, Donald	Republican	Baptist	attorney	American University, Marquette	1993	1944
Illinois 17	Hare, Phil	Democratic	Roman Catholic	congressional aide, union leader	Alleman High School	2007	1949
Illinois 18	LaHood, Ray	Republican	Roman Catholic	congressional aide, teacher, state House of Representatives	Bradley University	1995	1945
Illinois 19	Shimkus, John	Republican	Lutheran	Madison County treasurer	U.S. Military Academy, Southern Illinois University	1997	1958
Indiana 1	Visclosky, Pete	Democratic	Roman Catholic	attorney, congressional staff member	Indiana University Northwest, Notre Dame Law School, Georgetown	1985	1949
Indiana 2	Donnelly, Joe	Democratic	Roman Catholic	lawyer, printing executive	Notre Dame	2007	1955
Indiana 3	Souder, Mark	Republican	Evangelical	U.S. Senate staff member	IPFW, Notre Dame	1995	1950
Indiana 4	Buyer, Steve	Republican	Methodist	legal counsel, military	The Citadel, Valparaíso University School of Law	1993	1958
Indiana 5	Burton, Dan	Republican	Christian	Indiana House of Representatives; State Senate	Indiana, Cincinnati Bible Seminary	1983	1938
Indiana 6	Pence, Mike	Republican	Christian	attorney, radio talk show host	Hanover College, Indiana University Robert H. McKinney School of Law	2001	1959
Indiana 7	Carson, André^{[F]}	Democratic	Muslim	Indianapolis City-County Council member	Concordia University Wisconsin, Indiana Wesleyan University	2008	1974
Indiana 8	Ellsworth, Brad	Democratic	Roman Catholic	Sheriff of Vanderburgh County	Indiana State University	2007	1958
Indiana 9	Hill, Baron	Democratic	Church of Christ	State House of Representatives, U.S. House	Furman University	2007	1953
Iowa 1	Braley, Bruce	Democratic	Presbyterian	lawyer	Iowa State University, University of Iowa	2007	1957
Iowa 2	Loebsack, Dave	Democratic	Methodist	political science professor at Cornell College	Iowa State University	2007	1952
Iowa 3	Boswell, Leonard	Democratic	Community of Christ	State Senate	Graceland University	1997	1934
Iowa 4	Latham, Tom	Republican	Lutheran	agribusiness	Iowa State University	1995	1948
Iowa 5	King, Steve	Republican	Roman Catholic	State Senate	Northwest Missouri State University (attended)	2003	1949
Kansas 1	Moran, Jerry	Republican	Methodist	State Senate Majority Leader	University of Kansas, Fort Hays State University (attended)	1997	1954
Kansas 2	Boyda, Nancy	Democratic	Methodist	analytical chemist	William Jewell College	2007	1955
Kansas 3	Moore, Dennis	Democratic	Protestant	attorney	University of Kansas, Washburn University	1999	1945
Kansas 4	Tiahrt, Todd	Republican	Assembly of God	Kansas State Senate	Evangel College, Southwest Missouri State University	1995	1951
Kentucky 1	Whitfield, Ed	Republican	Methodist	Kentucky House of Representatives, attorney	University of Kentucky, Wesley Theological Seminary	1995	1943
Kentucky 2	Lewis, Ron	Republican	Baptist	State House of Representatives, minister	Kentucky, Morehead State University, Southern Baptist Theological Seminary	1994*	1946
Kentucky 3	Yarmuth, John	Democratic	Jewish	newspaper publisher	Yale University	2007	1947
Kentucky 4	Davis, Geoff	Republican	Baptist	manufacturing consultant	U.S. Military Academy	2005	1958
Kentucky 5	Rogers, Hal	Republican	Baptist	attorney	University of Kentucky	1981	1937
Kentucky 6	Chandler, Ben	Democratic	Presbyterian	State Auditor, Kentucky Attorney General	University of Kentucky	2004*	1959
Louisiana 1	Scalise, Steve^{[J]}	Republican	Roman Catholic	Louisiana State Legislature	Louisiana State University	2008	1965
Louisiana 2	Jefferson, William	Democratic	Baptist	State Senate	Southern University, Harvard University	1991	1947
Louisiana 3	Melancon, Charlie	Democratic	Roman Catholic	industry association president	University of Southwestern Louisiana	2005	1947
Louisiana 4	McCrery, Jim	Republican	Methodist	corporate attorney	Louisiana Tech	1988*	1949
Louisiana 5	Alexander, Rodney	Republican	Baptist	State House of Representatives	Louisiana Tech	2003	1946
Louisiana 6	Cazayoux, Don^{[K]}	Democratic	Roman Catholic	Louisiana State Legislature	Louisiana State University	2008	1964
Louisiana 7	Boustany, Charles	Republican	Episcopalian	general surgeon	University of Southwestern Louisiana, Louisiana State	2005	1956
Maine 1	Allen, Tom	Democratic	Protestant	Mayor of Portland	Bowdoin College, Wadham College, Harvard University	1997	1945
Maine 2	Michaud, Mike	Democratic	Roman Catholic	Maine State Legislature	Unity College	2001	1955
Maryland 1	Gilchrest, Wayne	Republican	Methodist	teacher	Delaware State College	1991	1946
Maryland 2	Ruppersberger, Dutch	Democratic	Methodist	Baltimore County Executive	University of Maryland, University of Baltimore	2003	1946
Maryland 3	Sarbanes, John	Democratic	Eastern Orthodox	lawyer	Princeton University, Harvard Law School	2007	1962
Maryland 4	Edwards, Donna	Democratic		community activist	Wake Forest University, Franklin Pierce Law Center	2008	1958
Maryland 5	Hoyer, Steny	Democratic	Baptist	State Senate President	Maryland, Georgetown	1981	1939
Maryland 6	Bartlett, Roscoe	Republican	Adventist	education, private sector	Columbia Union, Maryland	1993	1926
Maryland 7	Cummings, Elijah	Democratic	Baptist	State House of Delegates	Howard, Maryland	1996	1951
Maryland 8	Van Hollen, Chris	Democratic	Episcopalian	Maryland House of Delegates, Maryland State Senate	Swarthmore, Harvard University, Georgetown University	2003	1959
Massachusetts 1	Olver, John	Democratic	Non-Affiliated	Massachusetts State Legislature college professor	Rensselaer, Tufts, MIT	1991*	1936
Massachusetts 2	Neal, Richard	Democratic	Roman Catholic	Mayor of Springfield	American International College, University of Hartford	1989	1949
Massachusetts 3	McGovern, Jim	Democratic	Roman Catholic	congressional staff member	American University	1997	1959
Massachusetts 4	Frank, Barney	Democratic	Jewish	Massachusetts House of Representatives	Harvard	1981	1940
Massachusetts 5	Tsongas, Niki^{[E]}	Democratic	Eastern Orthodox	Dean of External Affairs at Middlesex Community College	Smith College, Boston University	2007	1946
Massachusetts 6	Tierney, John	Democratic	Non-Affiliated	attorney	Salem State College, Suffolk University	1997	1951
Massachusetts 7	Markey, Ed	Democratic	Roman Catholic	State House of Representatives	Boston College, Boston College Law School	1976	1946
Massachusetts 8	Capuano, Mike	Democratic	Roman Catholic	Mayor of Somerville	Dartmouth College, Boston College Law School	1999	1952
Massachusetts 9	Lynch, Stephen	Democratic	Roman Catholic	Massachusetts State Legislature	Wentworth Institute of Technology, Boston College Law School	2001*	1955
Massachusetts 10	Delahunt, Bill	Democratic	Roman Catholic	Norfolk County District Attorney	Middlebury College, Boston College Law School	1997	1941
Michigan 1	Stupak, Bart	Democratic	Roman Catholic	attorney, State House of Representatives	Northwestern Michigan College, Saginaw Valley State College, Thomas M. Cooley Law School	1993	1952
Michigan 2	Hoekstra, Pete	Republican	Christian Reformed	manufacturing executive	Hope College, University of Michigan Ross School of Business	1993	1953
Michigan 3	Ehlers, Vern	Republican	Christian Reformed	Kent County board of commissioners, Michigan State Legislature	University of California, Berkeley, Calvin College (attended)	1993	1934
Michigan 4	Camp, Dave	Republican	Roman Catholic	State House of Representatives	Albion College, University of San Diego School of Law, University of Sussex (attended)	1991	1953
Michigan 5	Kildee, Dale	Democratic	Roman Catholic	State House of Representatives, State Senate	Sacred Heart Seminary, University of Detroit, University of Peshawar (attended)	1977	1929
Michigan 6	Upton, Fred	Republican	Protestant	U.S. government administrator	University of Michigan	1987	1953
Michigan 7	Walberg, Tim	Republican	Protestant	State House of Representatives	Fort Wayne Bible College	2007	1951
Michigan 8	Rogers, Mike	Republican	Methodist	State Senate	Adrian College	2001	1963
Michigan 9	Knollenberg, Joe	Republican	Roman Catholic	insurance agent	Eastern Illinois University	1993	1933
Michigan 10	Miller, Candice	Republican	Presbyterian	Harrison Township Supervisor, Macomb County Treasurer, State Secretary of State	Macomb County Community College, Northwood Institute	2003	1954
Michigan 11	McCotter, Thaddeus	Republican	Roman Catholic	Wayne County Commission, State Senate	University of Detroit	2003	1965
Michigan 12	Levin, Sander	Democratic	Jewish	U.S. Government administrator	University of Chicago, Columbia University, Harvard Law School	1983	1931
Michigan 13	Kilpatrick, Carolyn Cheeks	Democratic	Baptist	high school teacher, State House of Representatives	Ferris State University (attended), Western Michigan University (B.S.), University of Michigan (M.S.),	1997	1945
Michigan 14	Conyers, John	Democratic	Baptist	congressional aide	Wayne State University (B.A.); Wayne State University Law School (J.D.)	1965	1929
Michigan 15	Dingell, John	Democratic	Roman Catholic	asst. prosecutor, Wayne County	Georgetown University (Bachelor's, J.D.)	1955*	1926
Minnesota 1	Walz, Tim	Democratic–Farmer–Labor	Lutheran	Command Sergeant Major in the National Guard, teacher	Chadron State College	2007	1964
Minnesota 2	Kline, John	Republican	Methodist	U.S. Marine Corps colonel	Rice University, Shippensburg University	2003	1947
Minnesota 3	Ramstad, Jim	Republican	Protestant	State Senate	University of Minnesota, George Washington University Law School	1991	1946
Minnesota 4	McCollum, Betty	Democratic–Farmer–Labor	Roman Catholic	North St. Paul City Council, State House of Representatives	College of St. Catherine	2001	1954
Minnesota 5	Ellison, Keith	Democratic–Farmer–Labor	Muslim	State House of Representatives	Wayne State University, University of Minnesota Law School	2007	1963
Minnesota 6	Bachmann, Michele	Republican	Evangelical Lutheran	Education adviser for Minnesota Family Institute, State Senate	Winona State University, Oral Roberts University, Marshall-Wythe School of Law	2007	1956
Minnesota 7	Peterson, Collin	Democratic–Farmer–Labor	Lutheran	Certified Public Accountant, Minnesota State Senate	Moorhead State University	1991	1944
Minnesota 8	Oberstar, Jim	Democratic–Farmer–Labor	Roman Catholic	U.S. Marine Corps, chief staff assistant to Representative John Blatnik	College of St. Thomas, College of Europe, Laval University, Georgetown University	1975	1934
Mississippi 1	Childers, Travis^{[H]}	Democratic	Baptist	Prentiss County Chancery Court Clerk	University of Mississippi	2008	1958
Mississippi 2	Thompson, Bennie	Democratic	Methodist	alderman, mayor of Bolton, Hinds County Board of Supervisors	Tougaloo College, Jackson State University	1993*	1948
Mississippi 3	Pickering, Chip	Republican	Baptist	congressional aide	Ole Miss, Baylor University	1997	1963
Mississippi 4	Taylor, Gene	Democratic	Roman Catholic	U.S. Coast Guard, Bay St. Louis City Council, State Senate	Tulane, University of Southern Mississippi, Gulf Park	1989*	1953
Missouri 1	Clay Jr., William Lacy	Democratic	Roman Catholic	Missouri State Legislature	University of Maryland, Harvard	2001	1956
Missouri 2	Akin, Todd	Republican	Christian	Missouri National Guard, State House of Representatives	Worcester Polytechnic Institute	2001	1947
Missouri 3	Carnahan, Russ	Democratic	Methodist	State House of Representatives	University of Missouri	2005	1958
Missouri 4	Skelton, Ike	Democratic	Disciples of Christ	State Senate	University of Missouri, University of Edinburgh (attended)	1977	1931
Missouri 5	Cleaver, Emanuel	Democratic	Methodist	Mayor of Kansas City, pastor, radio show host	Prairie View A&M, St. Paul School of Divinity	2005	1944
Missouri 6	Graves, Sam	Republican	Baptist	State Senate	University of Missouri	2001	1963
Missouri 7	Blunt, Roy	Republican	Baptist	State Secretary of State	Southwest Baptist University	1997	1950
Missouri 8	Emerson, Jo Ann	Republican	Presbyterian	professional advocate	Ohio Wesleyan University	1996*	1950
Missouri 9	Hulshof, Kenny	Republican	Roman Catholic	Assistant State Attorney General	University of Missouri, University of Mississippi Law School	1997	1958
Montana At Large	Rehberg, Denny	Republican	Episcopalian	Montana House of Representatives, Lieutenant Governor, rancher	Montana State University, Washington State University	2001	1955
Nebraska 1	Fortenberry, Jeff	Republican	Roman Catholic	Lincoln city council, businessman	Louisiana State University, Georgetown, Franciscan University of Steubenville	2005	1960
Nebraska 2	Terry, Lee	Republican	Methodist	Omaha City Council, attorney	Nebraska, Creighton University	1999	1962
Nebraska 3	Smith, Adrian	Republican	Christian	Gering City Council, State Legislator	University of Nebraska–Lincoln	2007	1970
Nevada 1	Berkley, Shelley	Democratic	Jewish	State Assembly; attorney	UNLV, San Diego	1999	1951
Nevada 2	Heller, Dean	Republican	LDS	Nevada Assembly, State Secretary of State	University of Southern California	2007	1960
Nevada 3	Porter, Jon	Republican	Roman Catholic	Nevada Senate; insurance executive	Briar Cliff	2003	1955
New Hampshire 1	Shea-Porter, Carol	Democratic	Roman Catholic	social worker, Rochester City Council	University of New Hampshire	2007	1955
New Hampshire 2	Hodes, Paul	Democratic	Jewish	lawyer	Dartmouth College, Boston College	2007	1951
New Jersey 1	Andrews, Rob	Democratic	Episcopalian	Camden County Board of Chosen Freeholders	Bucknell, Cornell	1990	1957
New Jersey 2	LoBiondo, Frank	Republican	Roman Catholic	New Jersey General Assembly	St. Joseph's University	2003	1946
New Jersey 3	Saxton, Jim	Republican	Methodist	New Jersey Senate	East Stroudsburg University, Temple University	1984	1943
New Jersey 4	Smith, Chris	Republican	Roman Catholic	retail executive	Trenton State College	1980	1953
New Jersey 5	Garrett, Scott	Republican	Protestant	New Jersey General Assembly	Montclair State, Rutgers University	2003	1959
New Jersey 6	Pallone, Frank	Democratic	Roman Catholic	Long Branch city council, New Jersey Senate	Middlebury, Tufts, Rutgers	1989	1951
New Jersey 7	Ferguson, Mike	Republican	Roman Catholic	teacher	Notre Dame, Georgetown	2001	1970
New Jersey 8	Pascrell, Bill	Democratic	Roman Catholic	New Jersey General Assembly, Mayor of Paterson	Fordham University	1989	1937
New Jersey 9	Rothman, Steve	Democratic	Jewish	Mayor of Englewood, Bergen County Surrogate Court judge	Syracuse, Washington University	1997	1952
New Jersey 10	Payne, Donald	Democratic	Baptist	Newark City Council	Seton Hall, Springfield College	1989	1934
New Jersey 11	Frelinghuysen, Rodney	Republican	Episcopalian	New Jersey General Assembly	Hobart College	1995	1946
New Jersey 12	Holt Jr., Rush	Democratic	Quaker	physicist	Carleton College, NYU	1999	1948
New Jersey 13	Sires, Albio	Democratic	Roman Catholic	Mayor of West New York, Speaker of the New Jersey General Assembly	Saint Peter's, Middlebury	2006*	1951
New Mexico 1	Wilson, Heather	Republican	Methodist	business development planner	United States Air Force Academy	1999	1960
New Mexico 2	Pearce, Steve	Republican	Baptist	State House of Representatives	New Mexico State University	2003	1947
New Mexico 3	Udall, Tom	Democratic	LDS	State Attorney General	Prescott College, Cambridge University, University of New Mexico	1999	1948
New York 1	Bishop, Tim	Democratic	Roman Catholic	Provost of Southampton College	Holy Cross, LIU	2003	1950
New York 2	Israel, Steve	Democratic	Jewish	Huntington Town Board	Nassau Community College, George Washington	2001	1958
New York 3	King, Peter	Republican	Roman Catholic	Hempstead Town Council, Nassau County Comptroller	St. Francis, Notre Dame Law	1993	1944
New York 4	McCarthy, Carolyn	Democratic	Roman Catholic	Practical Nurse	Glen Cove Nursing School	1997	1944
New York 5	Ackerman, Gary	Democratic	Jewish	New York State Senator; newspaper publisher	Queens College	1983	1942
New York 6	Meeks, Gregory	Democratic	Baptist	New York Assemblyman	Adelphi University, Howard University	1999	1953
New York 7	Crowley, Joseph	Democratic	Roman Catholic	New York Assemblyman	Queens College	1999	1962
New York 8	Nadler, Jerrold	Democratic	Jewish	New York Assemblyman	Columbia University, Fordham Law	1993	1947
New York 9	Weiner, Anthony	Democratic	Jewish	New York City Councilman,	SUNY Plattsburgh	1999	1964
New York 10	Towns, Ed	Democratic	Baptist	Brooklyn Deputy Borough President	North Carolina A&T, Adelphi	1983	1934
New York 11	Clarke, Yvette	Democratic	AME	New York City Councilwoman	Murrow High Schoolattended several colleges, but never graduated	2007	1964
New York 12	Velázquez, Nydia	Democratic	Roman Catholic	Director, Dept. of Puerto Rican Community Affairs	UPR, NYU	1993	1953
New York 13	Fossella, Vito	Republican	Roman Catholic	New York City Councilman	Wharton, Fordham Law	1997	1965
New York 14	Maloney, Carolyn	Democratic	Presbyterian	New York City Councilwoman	Greensboro College	1993	1948
New York 15	Rangel, Charles	Democratic	Roman Catholic	United States Army Sergeant, attorney, New York Assemblyman	NYU, St. John's	1971	1930
New York 16	Serrano, José	Democratic	Roman Catholic	New York Assemblyman	Lehman College	1990	1943
New York 17	Engel, Eliot	Democratic	Jewish	high school teacher, New York Assemblyman	Lehman College, New York Law School	1989	1947
New York 18	Lowey, Nita	Democratic	Jewish	New York Assistant Secretary of State	Mount Holyoke	1989	1937
New York 19	Hall, John	Democratic	Christian	musician Ulster County Legislature; Saugerties School Board	Notre Dame never graduated	2007	1948
New York 20	Gillibrand, Kirsten	Democratic	Roman Catholic	lawyer	Dartmouth College	2007	1966
New York 21	McNulty, Michael	Democratic	Roman Catholic	NY Assemblyman; Mayor of Green Island	Holy Cross	1989	1945
New York 22	Hinchey, Maurice	Democratic	Roman Catholic	New York Assemblyman	SUNY New Paltz	1993	1938
New York 23	McHugh, John	Republican	Roman Catholic	New York State Senator	Utica College, Albany	1993	1948
New York 24	Arcuri, Michael	Democratic	Roman Catholic	Oneida County District Attorney	SUNY Albany	2007	1959
New York 25	Walsh, Jim	Republican	Roman Catholic	Syracuse Common Council	St. Bonaventure	1989	1947
New York 26	Reynolds, Tom	Republican	Presbyterian	New York Assemblyman	Kent State	1999	1950
New York 27	Higgins, Brian	Democratic	Roman Catholic	Buffalo Common Council, New York State Assemblyman	Buffalo State, Harvard	2005	1959
New York 28	Slaughter, Louise	Democratic	Episcopalian	Monroe County Legislature, New York Assemblywoman	Kentucky	1987	1929
New York 29	Kuhl, Randy	Republican	Episcopalian	New York State Assembly, New York State Senator	Union College, Syracuse Law	2005	1943
North Carolina 1	Butterfield, G. K.	Democratic	Baptist	North Carolina Supreme Court Justice	North Carolina Central University	2004*	1947
North Carolina 2	Etheridge, Bob	Democratic	Presbyterian	Harnett County commissioner, North Carolina House of Representatives, Public Schools Administrator, North Carolina	Campbell University	1997	1941
North Carolina 3	Jones, Walter	Republican	Roman Catholic	North Carolina House of Representatives	Atlantic Christian College	1995	1943
North Carolina 4	Price, David	Democratic	Baptist	college professor	Mars Hill College, University of North Carolina at Chapel Hill, Yale	1997	1940
North Carolina 5	Foxx, Virginia	Republican	Roman Catholic	North Carolina State Senate	UNC-Chapel Hill, UNC-Greensboro	2005	1943
North Carolina 6	Coble, Howard	Republican	Presbyterian	NC Secretary of Revenue, state representative	Guilford College, University of North Carolina at Chapel Hill	1985	1931
North Carolina 7	McIntyre, Mike	Democratic	Presbyterian	attorney	University of North Carolina at Chapel Hill	1997	1956
North Carolina 8	Hayes, Robin	Republican	Presbyterian	North Carolina House of Representatives	Duke	1999	1945
North Carolina 9	Myrick, Sue	Republican	Evangelical Methodist	Business owner, mayor of Charlotte	Heidelberg College	1995	1941
North Carolina 10	McHenry, Patrick	Republican	Roman Catholic	North Carolina House of Representatives	NC State, Belmont Abbey College	2005	1975
North Carolina 11	Shuler, Heath	Democratic	Baptist	National Football League quarterback, real estate developer	University of Tennessee	2007	1971
North Carolina 12	Watt, Mel	Democratic	Presbyterian	attorney, State Senate	University of North Carolina at Chapel Hill, Yale Law School	1993	1945
North Carolina 13	Miller, Brad	Democratic	Episcopalian	North Carolina House of Representatives, State Senate	University of North Carolina at Chapel Hill, London School of Economics, Columbia	2003	1953
North Dakota At Large	Pomeroy, Earl	Democratic	Presbyterian	North Dakota House of Representatives, State Insurance Commissioner	UND, University of Durham	1993	1952
Ohio 1	Chabot, Steve	Republican	Roman Catholic	Cincinnati City Council, Hamilton County Commissioner	William and Mary, Northern Kentucky	1995	1953
Ohio 2	Schmidt, Jean	Republican	Roman Catholic	Miami Township trustee, State Senate	Cincinnati	2005*	1951
Ohio 3	Turner, Mike	Republican	Protestant	Mayor of Dayton	Ohio Northern, Case Western, Dayton	2003	1960
Ohio 4	Jordan, Jim	Republican	Christian	State General Assembly, Ohio State Senate	Graham High School	2007	1964
Ohio 5	Latta, Bob ^{G}	Republican	Christian	Wood County Commissioner, Ohio House of Representatives, Ohio State Senator	Bowling Green State University, University of Toledo	2007	1956
Ohio 6	Wilson, Charlie	Democratic	Roman Catholic	mortician, Ohio House of Representatives	Ohio University	2007	1943
Ohio 7	Hobson, Dave	Republican	Methodist	Ohio State Senator	Ohio Wesleyan, Ohio State	1991	1936
Ohio 8	Boehner, John	Republican	Roman Catholic	State House of Representatives	Xavier	1991	1949
Ohio 9	Kaptur, Marcy	Democratic	Roman Catholic	Domestic Policy Advisor, Carter Adm.	Wisconsin, Michigan, MIT	1983	1946
Ohio 10	Kucinich, Dennis	Democratic	Roman Catholic	Mayor of Cleveland	Case Western	1997	1946
Ohio 11	Fudge, Marcia^{[M]}	Democratic	Baptist	Mayor of Warrensville Heights	Ohio State University, Cleveland Marshall College of Law	2008*	1952
Ohio 12	Tiberi, Pat	Republican	Roman Catholic	Ohio House of Representatives	Ohio State, Capital	2001	1962
Ohio 13	Sutton, Betty	Democratic	Methodist	Barberton City Council, Summit County Council, Ohio House of Representatives	Kent State	2007	1963
Ohio 14	LaTourette, Steve	Republican	Methodist	Lake County Prosecutor	Michigan	2003	1954
Ohio 15	Pryce, Deborah	Republican	Presbyterian	Franklin County Judge	Ohio State, Capital	1993	1951
Ohio 16	Regula, Ralph	Republican	Episcopalian	U.S. Navy veteran, State Legislator	Mount Union, McKinley Law	1973	1924
Ohio 17	Ryan, Tim	Democratic	Roman Catholic	Ohio State Senator	Bowling Green State University	2003	1973
Ohio 18	Space, Zack	Democratic	Eastern Orthodox	attorney	Kenyon College, Ohio State University	2007	1961
Oklahoma 1	Sullivan, John	Republican	Roman Catholic	State House of Representatives	Northeastern State University	2003	1965
Oklahoma 2	Boren, Dan	Democratic	Methodist	State House of Representatives	Texas Christian University, University of Oklahoma	2005	1973
Oklahoma 3	Lucas, Frank	Republican	Baptist	State House of Representatives	Oklahoma State University	2003	1960
Oklahoma 4	Cole, Tom	Republican	Methodist	Oklahoma Senate, Oklahoma Secretary of State, college professor	Grinell College, Yale, Oklahoma	2003	1949
Oklahoma 5	Fallin, Mary	Republican	Christian	State Representative, Lieutenant Governor	Oklahoma State	2007	1954
Oregon 1	Wu, David	Democratic	Presbyterian	attorney	Stanford, Yale Law School, Harvard Medical School (attended)	1999	1955
Oregon 2	Walden, Greg	Republican	Episcopalian	Oregon House of Representatives, State Senate	University of Oregon	1999	1957
Oregon 3	Blumenauer, Earl	Democratic	Non-Affiliated	Oregon state representative, Multnomah County Commissioner, Portland City Commissioner	Lewis & Clark College	1996*	1948
Oregon 4	DeFazio, Peter	Democratic	Roman Catholic	Lane County Commissioner, Chair	Tufts University, University of Oregon, University of Notre Dame	1987	1947
Oregon 5	Hooley, Darlene	Democratic	Lutheran	Clackamas County Commissioner	Oregon State University	1997	1939
Pennsylvania 1	Brady, Bob	Democratic	Roman Catholic	congressional aide; Pennsylvania Turnpike Commission	St. Thomas More High School	1998*	1945
Pennsylvania 2	Fattah, Chaka	Democratic	Baptist	Pennsylvania General Assembly	Community College of Philadelphia, Wharton School, Fels Institute of Government (attended)	1995	1956
Pennsylvania 3	English, Phil	Republican	Roman Catholic	Erie City Controller, Chief of Staff, State Senate	University of Pennsylvania	1995	1956
Pennsylvania 4	Altmire, Jason	Democratic	Roman Catholic	hospital executive	Florida State University	2007	1968
Pennsylvania 5	Peterson, John	Republican	Methodist	State Senator, Pennsylvania	Penn State	1997	1938
Pennsylvania 6	Gerlach, Jim	Republican	Protestant	Pennsylvania General Assembly	Dickinson College, Dickinson School of Law	2003	1955
Pennsylvania 7	Sestak, Joe	Democratic	Roman Catholic	Vice Admiral, U.S. Navy	US Naval Academy, Harvard	2007	1951
Pennsylvania 8	Murphy, Patrick	Democratic	Roman Catholic	Captain, U.S. Army	Widener University	2007	1973
Pennsylvania 9	Shuster, Bill	Republican	Lutheran	businessman	Dickinson College, American University	2001*	1961
Pennsylvania 10	Carney, Chris	Democratic	Roman Catholic	Associate Professor of political science at Penn State Worthington Scranton, army officer	Cornell College, University of Wyoming	2007	1959
Pennsylvania 11	Kanjorski, Paul	Democratic	Roman Catholic	community solicitor, judge	Temple, Dickinson School of Law	1985	1937
Pennsylvania 12	Murtha, John	Democratic	Roman Catholic	United States Army, State Representative	Pitt, Indiana University of Pennsylvania, Washington and Jefferson College	1974*	1932
Pennsylvania 13	Schwartz, Allyson	Democratic	Jewish	State Senator	Simmons, Bryn Mawr College	2005	1948
Pennsylvania 14	Doyle, Mike	Democratic	Roman Catholic	State Senator Chief of Staff	Penn State	1995	1953
Pennsylvania 15	Dent, Charlie	Republican	Presbyterian	State Senate	Penn State, Lehigh	2005	1960
Pennsylvania 16	Pitts, Joe	Republican	Protestant	State Representative, Pennsylvania	Asbury College	1997	1939
Pennsylvania 17	Holden, Tim	Democratic	Roman Catholic	Schuylkill County Sheriff	Bloomsburg University	1993	1957
Pennsylvania 18	Murphy, Tim	Republican	Roman Catholic	State Senator, Pennsylvania	Wheeling Jesuit University, Cleveland State University, University of Pittsburgh	2003	1952
Pennsylvania 19	Platts, Todd	Republican	Episcopalian	State Representative, Pennsylvania	Shippensburg University, Pepperdine University School of Law	2001	1962
Rhode Island 1	Kennedy, Patrick	Democratic	Roman Catholic	State Legislature	Providence College	1995	1967
Rhode Island 2	Langevin, Jim	Democratic	Roman Catholic	Rhode Island State Assembly, Rhode Island Secretary of State	Rhode Island College, Kennedy School of Government	2001	1964
South Carolina 1	Brown, Henry	Republican	Baptist	Hanahan city council, South Carolina House of Representative	The Citadel, Baptist College	2001	1935
South Carolina 2	Wilson, Joe	Republican	Presbyterian	South Carolina State Senate	Washington and Lee University, University of South Carolina School of Law	2001	1947
South Carolina 3	Barrett, Gresham	Republican	Baptist	State Representative, South Carolina	The Citadel	2003	1961
South Carolina 4	Inglis, Bob	Republican	Presbyterian	attorney	Duke, University of Virginia School of Law	2005	1959
South Carolina 5	Spratt, John	Democratic	Presbyterian	attorney	Davidson, Oxford, Yale Law School	1983	1942
South Carolina 6	Clyburn, Jim	Democratic	AME	state government; teacher	South Carolina State	1993	1940
South Dakota At Large	Herseth Sandlin, Stephanie	Democratic	Lutheran	attorney	Georgetown University	2004	1970
Tennessee 1	Davis, David	Republican	Baptist	State Representative	East Tennessee State	2007	1959
Tennessee 2	Duncan, Jimmy	Republican	Presbyterian	state court judge	University of Tennessee, George Washington University	1988*	1947
Tennessee 3	Wamp, Zach	Republican	Baptist	Business owner, real estate broker	attended University of North Carolina at Chapel Hill, attended University of Tennessee	1995	1957
Tennessee 4	Davis, Lincoln	Democratic	Baptist	Mayor of Byrdstown, Tennessee State Legislature	Tennessee Tech	2003	1943
Tennessee 5	Cooper, Jim	Democratic	Episcopalian	college professor	University of North Carolina at Chapel Hill, Oriel College, Harvard University Law School	2003	1954
Tennessee 6	Gordon, Bart	Democratic	Methodist	Tennessee Democratic Party State Chair	Middle Tennessee State, University of Tennessee	1985	1949
Tennessee 7	Blackburn, Marsha	Republican	Presbyterian	Tennessee State Senate	Mississippi State	2003	1952
Tennessee 8	Tanner, John	Democratic	Disciples of Christ	Tennessee House of Representatives	University of Tennessee	1989	1944
Tennessee 9	Cohen, Steve	Democratic	Jewish	Tennessee State Senate, Attorney	Vanderbilt, University of Memphis	2007	1949
Texas 1	Gohmert, Louie	Republican	Baptist	Texas appeals court judge	Texas A&M, Baylor University	2005	1953
Texas 2	Poe, Ted	Republican	Church of Christ	federal court judge	Abilene Christian University, University of Houston Law Center	2005	1948
Texas 3	Johnson, Sam	Republican	Methodist	Texas state legislator	SMU	1991	1930
Texas 4	Hall, Ralph	Republican	Methodist	Texas State Senate, attorney; financial executive	SMU, attended Texas Christian, attended Texas	1981	1923
Texas 5	Hensarling, Jeb	Republican	Episcopalian	energy executive	Texas A&M, University of Texas, Austin	2003	1957
Texas 6	Barton, Joe	Republican	Methodist	oil industry consultant	Texas A&M, Purdue	1985	1949
Texas 7	Culberson, John	Republican	Methodist	Texas House of Representatives	SMU, South Texas College of Law	2001	1956
Texas 8	Brady, Kevin	Republican	Roman Catholic	Beaumont, Texas Chamber of Commerce executive	University of South Dakota	1997	1955
Texas 9	Green, Al	Democratic	Christian	Harris County Justice of the Peace, Houston NAACP president	Florida A&M, Tuskegee Institute, Texas Southern	2005	1947
Texas 10	McCaul, Michael	Republican	Roman Catholic	attorney, federal prosecutor	Trinity University, St. Mary's University, attended Harvard University	2005	1962
Texas 11	Conaway, Mike	Republican	Baptist	oil exploration executive	East Texas State	2005	1948
Texas 12	Granger, Kay	Republican	Methodist	Mayor of Fort Worth	Texas Wesleyan University	1999	1943
Texas 13	Thornberry, Mac	Republican	Presbyterian	rancher, attorney	Texas Tech, University of Texas Law School	1995	1958
Texas 14	Paul, Ron	Republican	Protestant	physician	Gettysburg College, Duke University School of Medicine	1997	1935
Texas 15	Hinojosa, Rubén	Democratic	Roman Catholic	food processing executive, Texas State Board of Education	University of Texas, Austin, University of Texas-Pan American	1997	1940
Texas 16	Reyes, Silvestre	Democratic	Roman Catholic	U.S. Immigration and Naturalization Service administrator	El Paso Community College, attended University of Texas, El Paso	1997	1944
Texas 17	Edwards, Chet	Democratic	Methodist	Texas State Senator	Texas A&M, Harvard Business School	1991	1951
Texas 18	Jackson-Lee, Sheila	Democratic	Adventist	Houston City Council	Yale, University of Virginia Law School	1995	1950
Texas 19	Neugebauer, Randy	Republican	Baptist	Lubbock City Council, real estate developer	Texas Tech	2003	1949
Texas 20	Gonzalez, Charlie	Democratic	Roman Catholic	district court judge	University of Texas, Austin, St. Mary's University	1999	1945
Texas 21	Smith, Lamar	Republican	Christian Scientist	Bexar County, Texas commissioner	Yale, Southern Methodist University School of Law	1987	1947
Texas 22	Lampson, Nick	Democratic	Roman Catholic	US Congressman, Texas 9th district	Lamar University	1997	1945
Texas 23	Rodriguez, Ciro	Democratic	Roman Catholic	Texas State Representative, US Congressman, Texas 28th district	University of Texas at Austin	1993	1946
Texas 24	Marchant, Kenny	Republican	Nazarene	mayor of Carrolton, State Representative, Texas	Southern Nazarene University	2005	1951
Texas 25	Doggett, Lloyd	Democratic	Methodist	Texas State Senate, Texas state supreme court justice, college professor	University of Texas at Austin	1995	1946
Texas 26	Burgess, Michael	Republican	Reformed Episcopalian	physician	North Texas State, University of Texas Health Science Center at Houston	2003	1950
Texas 27	Ortiz, Solomon	Democratic	Methodist	County Commissioners Court of Nueces County, Nueces County Sheriff	attended Del Mar College	1983	1937
Texas 28	Cuellar, Henry	Democratic	Roman Catholic	Texas House of Representatives, Texas Secretary of State	Edmund A. Walsh School of Foreign Service, University of Texas	2005	1955
Texas 29	Green, Gene	Democratic	Methodist	State Representative, State Senator, Texas	University of Houston	1993	1947
Texas 30	Johnson, Eddie Bernice	Democratic	Baptist	State Senator, Texas, nurse	St. Mary's College, Texas Christian, SMU	1991	1935
Texas 31	Carter, John	Republican	Lutheran	district judge	Texas Tech, University of Texas at Austin	2003	1941
Texas 32	Sessions, Pete	Republican	Methodist	marketing executive	Southwestern University	1997	1955
Utah 1	Bishop, Rob	Republican	LDS	Utah State Representative, Chairman of the Utah Republican Party	University of Utah	2003	1951
Utah 2	Matheson, Jim	Democratic	LDS	Business owner	Harvard, UCLA	2001	1960
Utah 3	Cannon, Chris	Republican	LDS	attorney; venture capitalist	BYU	1997	1950
Vermont At Large	Welch, Peter	Democratic	Roman Catholic	Vermont Senate President Pro Tempore	Holy Cross, University of California-Berkeley	2007	1947
Virginia 1	Wittman, Rob^{[H]}	Republican	Episcopalian	Mayor of Montross, Westmoreland County Board of Supervisors, Virginia State House	Virginia Polytechnic, Chapel Hill, VCU	2007	1959
Virginia 2	Drake, Thelma	Republican	UCC	Virginia State House	Old Dominion University	2005	1949
Virginia 3	Scott, Robert	Democratic	Episcopalian	Virginia State Legislature	Harvard University, Boston College Law School	1993	1947
Virginia 4	Forbes, Randy	Republican	Baptist	Virginia State Senate	Randolph-Macon College, University of Virginia School of Law	2001	1952
Virginia 5	Goode, Virgil	Republican	Baptist	Virginia State Senate	University of Richmond, University of Virginia School of Law	1997	1946
Virginia 6	Goodlatte, Bob	Republican	Christian Scientist	Private legal practice	Bates College, Washington and Lee University	1993	1952
Virginia 7	Cantor, Eric	Republican	Jewish	Virginia State House	George Washington University, College of William and Mary, Columbia University	2001	1963
Virginia 8	Moran, Jim	Democratic	Roman Catholic	Mayor of Alexandria	College of the Holy Cross, University of Pittsburgh	1991	1945
Virginia 9	Boucher, Rick	Democratic	Methodist	Virginia State Senate	Roanoke College, University of Virginia School of Law	1983	1946
Virginia 10	Wolf, Frank	Republican	Presbyterian	Assistant to the Secretary of the Interior	Pennsylvania State University, Georgetown University	1981	1939
Virginia 11	Vacant^{[N]}						
Washington 1	Inslee, Jay	Democratic	Protestant	Attorney	Washington, Willamette	1999	1951
Washington 2	Larsen, Rick	Democratic	Methodist	Snohomish County Council	Pacific Lutheran, Minnesota	2001	1965
Washington 3	Baird, Brian	Democratic	Protestant	Psychologist	Utah, Wyoming	1999	1956
Washington 4	Hastings, Doc	Republican	Roman Catholic	Washington State House	Columbia Basin, Central Washington	1995	1941
Washington 5	McMorris Rodgers, Cathy	Republican	Christian	Washington State House	Pensacola Christian, Washington	2005	1969
Washington 6	Dicks, Norm	Democratic	Lutheran	Legislative Assistant	Washington	1977	1940
Washington 7	McDermott, Jim	Democratic	Episcopalian	Psychiatrist, Washington State Senate	Wheaton, Illinois	1989	1936
Washington 8	Reichert, Dave	Republican	Lutheran	King County Sheriff	Concordia Lutheran	2005	1950
Washington 9	Smith, Adam	Democratic	Christian	Washington State Senate	Fordham, Washington	1997	1965
West Virginia 1	Mollohan, Alan	Democratic	Baptist	attorney	William & Mary, WVU	1983	1943
West Virginia 2	Capito, Shelley Moore	Republican	Presbyterian	West Virginia House of Delegates	Duke, University of Virginia	2001	1953
West Virginia 3	Rahall, Nick	Democratic	Presbyterian	Senate Staff Member; media executive	Duke, George Washington	1977	1949
Wisconsin 1	Ryan, Paul	Republican	Roman Catholic	Legislative Director	Miami University	1999	1970
Wisconsin 2	Baldwin, Tammy	Democratic	Non-Affiliated	Dane County Board of Supervisors, Wisconsin State Assembly	Smith, Wisconsin	1999	1962
Wisconsin 3	Kind, Ron	Democratic	Lutheran	County Prosecutor	London School of Economics, Minnesota	1997	1963
Wisconsin 4	Moore, Gwen	Democratic	Baptist	Wisconsin State Assembly, Wisconsin State Senate	Marquette, Harvard	2005	1951
Wisconsin 5	Sensenbrenner, Jim	Republican	Episcopalian	Wisconsin State Senate	Stanford, Wisconsin	1979	1943
Wisconsin 6	Petri, Tom	Republican	Lutheran	Wisconsin State Senate	Harvard	1979	1940
Wisconsin 7	Obey, Dave	Democratic	Roman Catholic	Wisconsin State Assembly	Wisconsin	1969	1938
Wisconsin 8	Kagen, Steve	Democratic	Jewish	allergist	University of Wisconsin–Madison, Medical College of Wisconsin	2007	1949
Wyoming At Large	Cubin, Barbara	Republican	Episcopalian	Wyoming State Senate; Wyoming State House	Creighton	1995	1946

=== Delegates ===
District	Name	Party	Religion	Former Experience	Schooling	Assumed office	Born In
American Samoa	Eni Fa'aua'a Hunkin Faleomavaega, Jr.	Democratic	LDS	Lieutenant Governor of American Samoa	Brigham Young University, University of Houston, University of California, Berkeley	1989	1943
District of Columbia	Eleanor Holmes Norton	Democratic	Episcopalian	Equal Employment Opportunity Commission	Antioch College, Yale University, Yale Law School	1991	1937
Guam	Madeleine Bordallo	Democratic	Roman Catholic	Lieutenant Governor of Guam	Saint Mary's College, College of St. Catherine	2003	1933
Puerto Rico	Luis Fortuño	New Progressive Party and Republican	Roman Catholic	National Committeeman	Georgetown University, University of Virginia School of Law	2005	1960
United States Virgin Islands	Donna Christian-Christensen	Democratic	Moravian	Commissioner of Health	Saint Mary's College, George Washington University	1997	1945

== Notes ==
^{A} John Barrasso was appointed by Wyoming Governor Dave Freudenthal on June 25, 2007, after Craig L. Thomas died on June 4, 2007.
^{B} Laura Richardson replaced Juanita Millender-McDonald, who died on April 22, 2007, on August 21, 2007, after a special election.
^{C} Paul Broun replaced Charlie Norwood, who died on February 3, 2007, on July 25, 2007, after a special election.
^{D} Dennis Hastert resigned November 26, 2007, and was replaced by a special election by Bill Foster.
^{E} Niki Tsongas replaced Marty Meehan who resigned on July 7, 2007, on October 18, 2007, after a special election.
^{F} Julia Carson died on December 15, 2007, and was replaced by a special election by André Carson.
^{G} Bob Latta replaced Paul Gillmor, who died on September 5, 2007, on December 13, 2007, after a special election.
^{H} Rob Wittman replaced Jo Ann Davis, who died on October 6, 2007, on December 13, 2007, after a special election.
^{I} Trent Lott resigned from his Senate seat on December 18, 2007. Mississippi Governor Haley Barbour appointed Congressman Roger Wicker on December 31, 2007, to replace him. Wicker was replaced by Travis Childers after a special election.
^{J} Bobby Jindal resigned January 14, 2008, and was replaced by Steve Scalise after a special election.
^{K} Richard Baker resigned on February 2, 2008, and was replaced by Don Cazayoux after a special election.
^{L} Tom Lantos died on February 11, 2008, and was replaced by Jackie Speier after a special election.
^{M} Stephanie Tubbs Jones died on August 10, 2008, and was replaced by Marcia Fudge after a special election.
^{N} Thomas M. Davis resigned on November 24, 2008.

== See also ==
- United States general elections, 2006
- United States Senate elections, 2006
- United States House election, 2006

== Sources ==
- Hispanic Americans in Congress
- This Nation
