= 2007 California's 37th congressional district special election =

- August 21, 2007

California's 37th congressional district
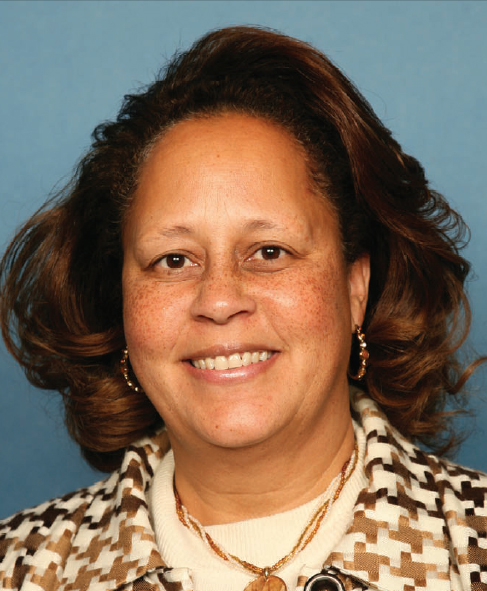

Nominee	Laura Richardson	John Kanaley	Daniel Brezenoff
Party	Democratic	Republican	Green
Popular vote	15,559	5,837	1,274
Percentage	65.6%	24.6%	5.4%
U.S. Representative before election
Juanita Millender-McDonald
Democratic
Elected U.S. Representative
Laura Richardson
Democratic

California's 37th congressional district special election, 2007 was held on August 21, 2007, to replace the seat of Congresswoman Juanita Millender-McDonald, who died of cancer on April 22, 2007. California State Assemblymember Laura Richardson received the plurality of votes in an open primary election on June 26. Since no candidate won a majority of votes in that contest, the special election was held on August 21, in which Richardson was the winner.

== Background ==
The district has been historically Democratic. In the 2004 Presidential election, John Kerry received 74% of the vote and George W. Bush received 25% of the vote. The district has a Cook Partisan Voting Index score of D +27. The district's high African American and Mexican American populations also make the district lean Democrat because those groups have tended to vote with the Democrats. It came as little surprise when Republican John M. Kanaley received 5,309 votes or 25.24% of the total. After the June 26 election, various articles that appeared in the Los Angeles Times and the Long Beach Press-Telegram all but declared Richardson the eventual winner (see references below).

A spokesman for the Democratic Congressional Campaign Committee told The Hill that the committee had no plans to get involved in the election. Despite making claims to originally stay out of the Congressional race, the Democratic Party endorsed Oropeza on May 19, 2007. Oropeza took 119 of the 168 ballots cast by party delegates, or 71 percent, reaching the 60 percent threshold needed to win the party's endorsement .

Richardson accused Senate President Pro Tem Don Perata of having "dumped 130 people here" from outside the district to throw the democratic party vote to Oropeza . In the race, Perata supported fellow State Senator Oropeza. Richardson was endorsed by several California State Assembly members that included Speaker Fabian Nunez, Majority Leader Karen Bass, Assembly member Mervyn Dymally, and former Speaker Willie Brown.

=== The Black vote ===
McDonald won only two votes from party delegates at the Democratic party endorsement. The vast majority of black delegates in attendance voted for Richardson, while Oropeza won all but a few of the Latino, white and Filipino delegates. Blacks make up roughly 25% of registered voters. Many black leaders saw this election as a test of their political clout. As Millender-McDonald was Black, Black leaders wanted to hang onto the congressional seat that had been held by an African-American, even as the seat's Latino population has grown rapidly. Black Congresswoman Maxine Waters also endorsed Richardson, as did many black state representatives.

=== The McDonald factor ===
Originally, the membership of the Congressional Black Caucus was divided between those who supported Richardson and those who supported Valerie McDonald, daughter of the late Millender-McDonald. McDonald was backed by US Congresswoman Diane Watson and some local churches and other political leaders. McDonald is the executive director of the African American Women Health and Education Foundation in Carson, a nonprofit founded by her mother. Some black leaders feared that the two black candidates would split the vote and lead to an Oropeza victory. Polls that were conducted began to justify that fear. Seeing this fact, many Black leaders began to rally around and throw their support to Richardson over McDonald.

=== The Latino vote ===
While the growing Latino vote represented 40% of the district's population, the Latino vote was about 21%. Most major Latino leaders and organizations, including the Congressional Hispanic Caucus, also supported Orepeza.

=== Labor versus Indian gaming ===
The race can also be seen as a contest between two of California's interest groups: Labor and Indian gaming. The two groups clashed over five tribal compacts that would double the number of slot machines at Indian casinos. Labor groups fought the compacts because they believed the compacts did not adequately protect workers.

Richardson had strong financial support from organized labor that included the Los Angeles County Federation of Labor, which provided volunteers to walk precincts and make phone calls in the final days of the race. The Los Angeles County Federation of Labor spent $275,000 on Richardson's campaign and put more than 1,000 union members on the street, made 45,000 phone calls and distributed 166,000 pieces of mail. Oropeza voted for the compacts. The tribes showed their gratitude by spending $457,000 of independently on television ads in Oropeza's support. Morongo Band of Mission Indians spent $440,000 alone.

== Candidates ==
Democratic

- Lee Davis - publisher
- Mervin Evans - Army veteran, businessman, and frequent candidate
- Felicia Ford - Corporate Executive Officer
- Bill Francisco Grisolia - Paralegal/Businessman
- Peter Mathews University Professor
- Valerie McDonald - daughter of deceased Rep. Millender-McDonald
- Jenny Oropeza - State Senator, 2007–Present; State Assemblywoman, 2001–2007; Long Beach City Councilmember, 1995–2001
- George Parmer Jr. - truck driver
- Jeffrey Price - Workers Compensation Attorney
- Laura Richardson - State Assemblywoman, 2007–Present, Long Beach Councilmember, 2001–2005
- Ed Wilson - Signal Hill Councilmember, 1997–Present

Republican

- Leroy Joseph Guillory - minister
- John M. Kanaley - War Veteran
- Jeffrey "Lincoln" Leavitt - teacher
- Teri Ramirez - Businesswoman/mother

Green

- Daniel Abraham Brezenoff - Clinical social worker and activist

Libertarian

- Herb Peters - Retired aerospace engineer

== Polling ==
Source	Date	Kanaley (R)	McDonald (D)	Oropeza (D)	Ramirez (R)	Richardson (D)	Wilson (D)
Fairbanks, Maslin, Maulin, and Associates	Jun 5–7, 2007	5%	7%	16%	2%	25%	2%
Greenberg Quinlan Rosner Research	May 17–22, 2007	N/A	16%	27%	N/A	24%	N/A
David Binder Research	May 5–6, 2007	N/A	17%	26%	N/A	13%	N/A

== Results ==
Of the 25 candidates who originally filed, 17 appeared on the ballot; running were eleven Democrats, four Republicans, one Green, and one Libertarian.

California's 37th congressional district special primary, 2007
Party	Candidate	Votes	%
Democratic	Laura Richardson	11,956	36.5
Democratic	Jenny Oropeza	9,960	30.4
Democratic	Valerie McDonald	3,027	9.2
Republican	John Kanaley	2,425	7.4
Democratic	Peter Mathews	1,125	3.4
Republican	Teri Ramirez	612	1.9
Green	Daniel Brezenoff	391	1.2
Republican	Jeffrey Leavitt	386	1.2
Democratic	Albert Robles (write-in)	363	1.1
Democratic	Ed Wilson	362	1.1
Republican	L. J. Guillory	361	1.1
Libertarian	Herb Peters	342	1.0
Democratic	George Parmer	242	0.7
Democratic	Lee Davis	202	0.6
Democratic	Jeffrey Price	142	0.4
Democratic	Bill Grisolia	141	0.4
Democratic	Felicia Ford	122	0.4
Democratic	Marvin Evans	29	0.1
Invalid or blank votes		548	1.7
Total votes		32,736	100.0
Turnout			12.3

California's 37th congressional district special election, 2007
Party	Candidate	Votes	%
Democratic	Laura Richardson	15,559	65.6
Republican	John Kanaley	5,837	24.6
Green	Daniel Brezenoff	1,274	5.4
Libertarian	Herb Peters	538	2.3
Independent	Lee Davis (write-in)	12	0.1
Independent	Christopher Remple (write-in)	1	0.0
Invalid or blank votes		485	2.0
Total votes		23,706	100.0
Turnout			9.0
Democratic hold			

== Analysis ==
While race was a factor in the results of the election, some Blacks voters and leaders supported Orepeza, and some Latino voters and leaders backed Richardson. Richardson's victory in the primary depended on Black voters, but final results showed that Richardson won over many Latino voters and leaders.

Current population estimate in California projects a large increase in the Latino population in California over the next 40 years, while the population of Blacks, Asian Americans, and Whites as a percentage of total population is expected to decline

- Laura Richardson during her victory speech: "It's not just about money and it's not just about the number of years you've served. It's about what's in your heart" .
- Oropeza and Richardson released polls, each showing that person in the lead .

Richardson was a former aide to Millender-McDonald. She used a mailing, just days before the primary, to criticize Orepeza for missing votes, but did not mention that Oropeza missed these votes because she was being treated for cancer. Two other mailers also targeted Oropeza "for taking pay raises and claiming to have a bachelor's degree from Cal State Long Beach, when, in fact, she had failed to get credit for two classes, leaving her without a diploma." Richardson pledged on a cable TV Public-access television show candidate debate that she will not vote for any new funding for the Iraq war. After being elected, she said she had not made up her mind how she would vote.

== See also ==
- List of special elections to the United States House of Representatives
