= Paul Bannai =

American politician (1920–2019)

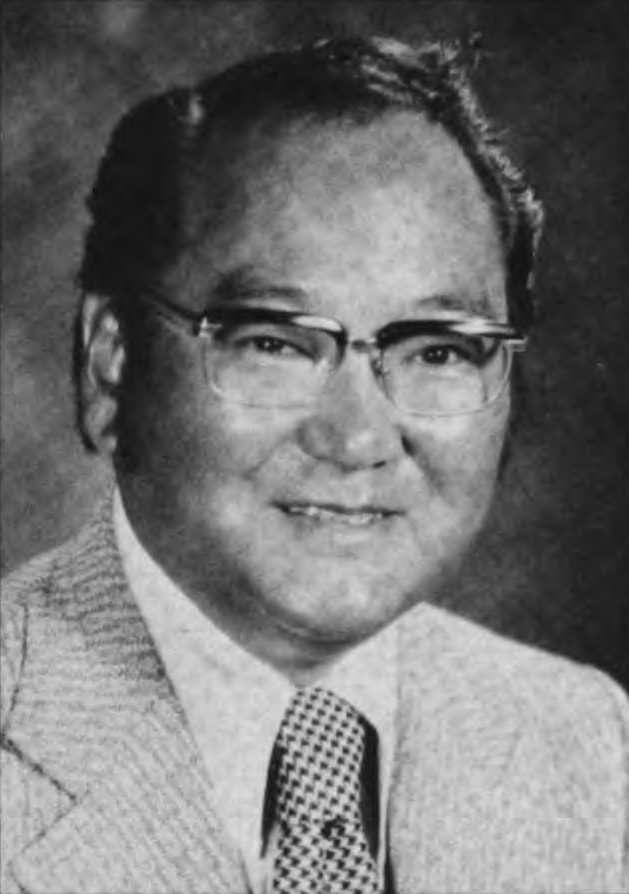
- Official portrait, 1975

Member of the California State Assembly
- In office June 28, 1973 – November 30, 1980
- Preceded by: Larry Townsend
- Succeeded by: Richard Floyd
- Constituency: 67th district (1973–1974); 53rd district (1974–1980)

Personal details
- Born: July 4, 1920 Delta, Colorado
- Died: September 14, 2019 (aged 99)
- Party: Republican
- Spouse: Hideko Matsuno (m. 1946)
- Children: 3
- Occupation: Realtor

Paul Takeo Bannai (July 4, 1920 – September 14, 2019) was an American politician who was the first Japanese American to ever serve in the California State Legislature. He served in the State Assembly as a Republican legislator from 1973 until 1980, when he was defeated for reelection by Democrat Richard Floyd.

== Legislative career ==
He represented the 67th District in his first term but was then reapportioned into the 53rd District, where he served for the rest of his time in the legislature. Bannai served on the following committees: Criminal Justice, Finance and Insurance, Veterans Affairs, Ways and Means, and Rules.

== Background ==
Bannai was born in Colorado in 1920 to Japanese immigrant parents. In 1942, he was interned at Manzanar during World War II with his family due to Executive Order 9066. From there, Bannai enlisted in the United States Army and served with the 442nd Infantry Regiment and the Army Intelligence Service.

Prior to serving in the legislature, Bannai served on the Gardena City Council and the Gardena Planning Commission. After his defeat, Bannai served as Chief Memorial Affairs Director for National Cemetery System which is part of the Veterans Administration.

He died in September 2019 at the age of 99.

California Assembly
Preceded by Larry Townsend	California State Assembly, 67th District; 1973–1974	Succeeded by Jerry Lewis
Preceded by Bill Greene	California State Assembly, 53rd District; 1974–1980	Succeeded by Richard Floyd
