= Star Parker =

American conservative activist, columnist, and congressional candidate

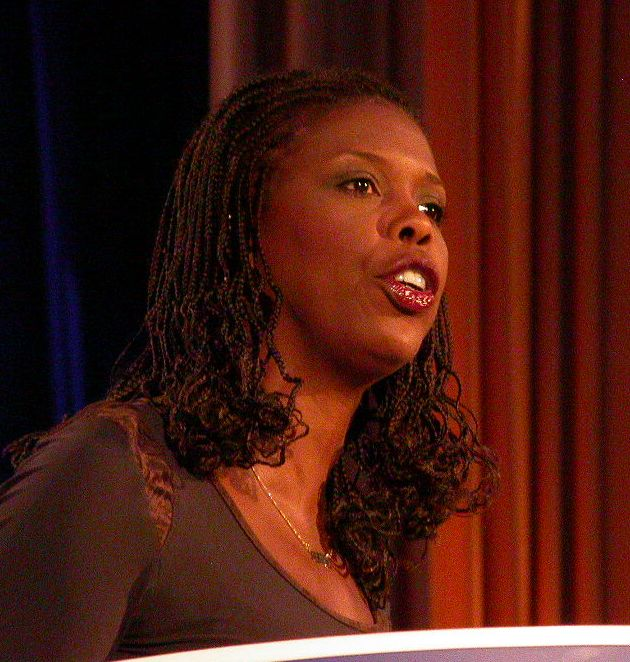
- Parker in 2008
- Born: Larstella Irby; October 23, 1955 (age 70); Moses Lake, Washington, U.S.
- Education: Los Angeles City College; Woodbury University (BA)
- Occupations: Author; syndicated columnist; television host; political activist
- Political party: Republican
- Website: curepolicy.org

Star Parker (born Larstella Irby, October 23, 1955) is an American conservative political activist, syndicated columnist, author, and television host. In 1995, she founded the Center for Urban Renewal and Education (CURE), a Washington, D.C.–based public policy institute that advocates faith-based, market-oriented approaches to poverty, family policy, and urban renewal.

Parker was a featured speaker at the 1996 Republican National Convention and consulted with federal and state legislators on the market-based welfare reforms that became law in 1996. She has been honored as the Conservative Political Action Conference's "Ronald Reagan Foot Soldier of the Year" (2016) and was appointed to the U.S. Frederick Douglass Bicentennial Commission by Senate Majority Leader Mitch McConnell in 2018 and to the U.S. Commission on Civil Rights California Advisory Committee by President Donald Trump in 2020.

Parker was the Republican nominee for the United States House of Representatives in California's 37th congressional district in 2010, losing to Democrat Laura Richardson. In 2025, she announced her candidacy for California's 49th congressional district in the 2026 election, challenging Democratic incumbent Mike Levin.

== Early life ==
Parker was born Larstella Irby on October 23, 1955, in Moses Lake, Washington. She has written and spoken extensively about a turbulent young adulthood in Los Angeles in which she relied on public assistance for several years. Parker has recounted that, after an arrest for shoplifting, a high school guidance counselor told her "not to worry about it, because I was a 'victim of racism, lashing out at society.'"

In 1983, Parker had a Christian conversion experience that she has described as the turning point of her life and the foundation of her later policy work. She subsequently launched a small Christian-themed magazine and advertising business in Los Angeles that was destroyed during the 1992 Los Angeles riots, an event she has cited as catalyzing her transition into full-time public-policy advocacy.

Parker attended Los Angeles City College and earned a Bachelor of Arts in marketing and international business from Woodbury University.

== Center for Urban Renewal and Education ==
Beginning in 1993, Parker consulted with federal and state legislators on market-based anti-poverty strategies, contributing to the public debate that produced the Personal Responsibility and Work Opportunity Reconciliation Act of 1996. In 1995, she founded the Coalition on Urban Renewal and Education, later renamed the Center for Urban Renewal and Education (CURE), and serves as its president.

CURE is a Washington, D.C.–based think tank that describes itself as a "think-and-do tank" addressing race, poverty, and culture from a Judeo-Christian perspective and advocating limited government, school choice, faith-based community renewal, and pro-life policy.

== Media and commentary ==
Parker writes a nationally syndicated weekly column distributed by Creators Syndicate, with placements in outlets including Townhall.com, Newsmax, The Epoch Times, RealClearPolitics, and over 100 local newspapers. She is a frequent guest commentator on Fox News (including Fox & Friends and Hannity), Newsmax, and EWTN, and contributes weekly segments to Straight Arrow News.

Earlier in her career, Parker was a recurring guest on national talk programs, including The Oprah Winfrey Show, Larry King Live, Politically Incorrect, and a televised BET debate with Jesse Jackson on welfare reform. She has lectured on more than 300 college and university campuses, including Harvard, the University of California, Berkeley, Emory, Liberty, Franciscan, and Pepperdine.

Since 2018, Parker has hosted CURE America with Star Parker, a weekly one-hour news and interview program airing on TCT TV, NRB TV, and several streaming platforms. Guests have included Senator Tim Scott, activist Grover Norquist, and then–House Minority Whip Steve Scalise.

== Government service and recognition ==
Parker was a featured speaker at the 1996 Republican National Convention in San Diego, where she addressed welfare reform and personal responsibility.

In November 2017, Parker testified before the House Judiciary Committee's Subcommittee on the Constitution and Civil Justice in support of the proposed Heartbeat Protection Act. The same year, she was named to the advisory team of the White House Center for Faith and Opportunity Initiatives, advising on policies for distressed communities.

In 2018, Senate Majority Leader Mitch McConnell appointed Parker to the U.S. Frederick Douglass Bicentennial Commission.

In 2020, President Donald Trump appointed Parker to a two-year term on the U.S. Commission on Civil Rights California Advisory Committee.

Awards and honors include the CPAC "Ronald Reagan Foot Soldier of the Year" Award (2016), the Groundswell Impact Award (2017), and the Bott Radio Network Queen Esther Award (2018).

== Political views ==
Parker is a self-described conservative who advocates limited government, free-market economics, school choice, traditional family structures, and faith-based community renewal. She has argued that long-term welfare programs foster dependency, writing in her 2003 book Uncle Sam's Plantation that government assistance can shift recipients' focus from "How do I take care of myself?" to "What do I have to do to stay on the plantation?"

Parker has stated that stable two-parent families and a culture of personal responsibility are central to ending generational poverty. She opposes abortion, same-sex marriage, and the use of federal tax dollars to fund birth control, and has written extensively against what she describes as the cultural and economic costs of family breakdown in African-American communities.

== 2010 congressional campaign ==
In March 2010, Parker announced her candidacy for the United States House of Representatives in California's 37th congressional district, which then encompassed most of Long Beach and Compton, along with Carson, Signal Hill, and surrounding municipalities. She lost the November 2 general election to Democratic incumbent Laura Richardson, receiving 22.7 percent of the vote.

== 2026 congressional campaign ==
In 2025, Parker announced her candidacy for the United States House of Representatives in California's 49th congressional district, a coastal seat covering portions of northern San Diego County and southern Orange County held by Democrat Mike Levin. Parker competed in the June 2, 2026, top-two primary alongside Levin and other candidates. She was eliminated in he primary.

Her stated campaign priorities include reducing federal regulation on small businesses, expanding patient-centered health-care reform, market-based housing supply, stricter immigration enforcement, and returning policymaking authority to states and localities.

== Books ==
- 1997: Pimps, Whores and Welfare Brats: From Welfare Cheat to Conservative Messenger (Pocket Books, ISBN 978-0-671-53466-0)
- 2003: Uncle Sam's Plantation: How Big Government Enslaves America's Poor and What We Can Do About It (Thomas Nelson, ISBN 978-0-7852-6219-0) — critique of long-term welfare programs.
- 2006: White Ghetto: How Middle Class America Reflects Inner City Decay (Thomas Nelson, ISBN 978-1-59555-027-9).
- 2014: Blind Conceit: Politics, Policy and Racial Polarization: Moving Forward to Save America (Sumner Books, ISBN 978-1-9391-0413-7).
- 2019: Necessary Noise: How Donald Trump Inflames the Culture War and Why This Is Good News for America (with Richard Manning; Center Street, ISBN 978-1-5460-7658-2)

== See also ==
- Black conservatism in the United States
- Center for Urban Renewal and Education
