= Richard Floyd (California politician) =

American politician

Member of the California State Assembly from the 55th district
- In office December 2, 1996 - November 30, 2000
- Preceded by: Juanita Millender-McDonald
- Succeeded by: Jenny Oropeza

Member of the California State Assembly from the 53rd district
- In office December 1, 1980 - November 30, 1992
- Preceded by: Paul Bannai
- Succeeded by: Debra Bowen

Personal details
- Born: February 3, 1931 Philadelphia, Pennsylvania
- Died: August 11, 2011 (aged 80) Sacramento, California
- Party: Democratic
- Children: Lorene and Rikki

Military service
- Branch/service: United States Army
- Battles/wars: Korean War

Richard Edward Floyd (February 3, 1931 – August 11, 2011) was a California State Assemblyman from the 53rd District who served from 1980 until 1992, when he was defeated by Juanita Millender-McDonald, after he and fellow Democratic assemblyman Dave Elder were reapportioned into the 55th District. He represented the 55th District again after McDonald was elected to Congress from 1996 until 2000, when he was termed out. He ran for a neighboring State Senate seat in 2000, but lost in the primary to Edward Vincent. Floyd received approximately 30% of the vote.

On the March 10, 1989, edition of ABC News Nightline, Floyd debated Lou Albano on state athletic commissions deregulating professional wrestling following Vince McMahon's public acknowledgment of its predetermined nature. Floyd had recently introduced a bill supporting deregulation by the California State Athletic Commission, and claimed it was foolish for states to be involved in assigning referees whose roles require they act incompetently. Albano aggressively promoted the American Wrestling Association and National Wrestling Alliance as more legitimate than McMahon's World Wrestling Federation (which he had recently and unamicably left), and deserving the same safety regulations afforded other sports. Floyd laughed off Albano's insistence on maintaining kayfabe, saying of it, "He's playing a game, like they all do. I'm a politician, I do the same thing."

California Assembly
Preceded by Paul Bannai	California State Assembly, 53rd District; December 1, 1980 - November 30, 1992	Succeeded by Debra Bowen
Preceded by Juanita Millender-McDonald	California State Assembly, 55th District; December 2, 1996 - November 30, 2000	Succeeded by Jenny Oropeza
