= California's 37th congressional district =

U.S. House district for California

Coordinates: 34°00′58″N 118°22′07″W

- Interactive map of district boundaries since January 3, 2023 (Note: The district includes the same census blocks as drawn by the Citizens Redistricting Commission in 2021 and during mid-decade redistricting as passed in Prop 50 (2025). As such, boundaries of the district will not change at the 2026 elections.)
- Representative: Sydney Kamlager-Dove; D–Los Angeles
- Population (2025): 760,437
- Median household income: $73,156
- Ethnicity: 54.0% Hispanic; 22.3% Black; 13.2% White; 6.3% Asian; 3.2% Two or more races; 1.1% other
- Cook PVI: D+33

California's 37th congressional district is a congressional district in the U.S. state of California based in Los Angeles County. It includes many neighborhoods west and southwest of Downtown Los Angeles.

The district includes

- Culver City
- Ladera Heights
- View Park-Windsor Hills
- the City of Los Angeles neighborhoods of Mid City, Century City, Beverlywood, View Park-Windsor Hills, South Robertson, Exposition Park, University Park, Vermont Knolls, West Adams, Leimert Park, Jefferson Park, Vermont Square, Hyde Park, Crenshaw, and Baldwin Hills.

The district is highly diverse ethnically. Approximately 40% of the district's residents are Hispanic, while African Americans and whites make up nearly a quarter each.

The district is currently represented by Democrat Sydney Kamlager-Dove; she was elected to the seat in the 2022 midterm elections and took office on January 3, 2023.

== Recent election results from statewide races ==
=== 2023–2033 boundaries ===
Year	Office	Results
2008	President	Obama 90–10%
2010	Governor	Brown 86–11%
2010	Lt. Governor	Newsom 79–12%
2010	Secretary of State	Bowen 83–10%
2010	Attorney General	Harris 80–15%
2010	Treasurer	Lockyer 85–9%
2010	Controller	Chiang 83–9%
2012	President	Obama 91–9%
2014	Governor	Brown 87–13%
2016	President	Clinton 88–7%
2018	Governor	Newsom 88–12%
2018	Attorney General	Becerra 90–10%
2020	President	Biden 86–12%
2022	Senate (Reg.)	Padilla 86–14%
2022	Governor	Newsom 85–15%
2022	Lt. Governor	Kounalakis 83–17%
2022	Secretary of State	Weber 86–14%
2022	Attorney General	Bonta 85–15%
2022	Treasurer	Ma 84–16%
2022	Controller	Cohen 81–19%
2024	President	Harris 79–18%
2024	Senate (Reg.)	Schiff 80–20%

== Composition ==
FIPS County Code	County	Seat	Population
37	Los Angeles	Los Angeles	9,663,345

Under the 2020 redistricting, California's 37th congressional district is located in the South Los Angeles region. It includes the city of Culver City; the Los Angeles neighborhoods of Jefferson Park, Hyde Park, Ladera, South Robertson, Crestview, Mid-City, Downtown Los Angeles, West Adams, South Los Angeles, Crenshaw, Leimert Park, Baldwin Hills, part of Carthay, part of Arlington Heights, and the north side of Century City; and the census-designated places Ladera Heights and View Park-Windsor Hills.

Los Angeles County is split between this district, the 30th district, the 34th district, the 36th district, the 42nd district, and the 43rd district. The 37th, 30th and 36th are partitioned by Phyllis Ave, N Doheny Dr, N Oakhurst Dr, Burton Way, N Robertson Blvd, 8733 Clifton Way-201 S Le Doux Rd, N San Vicente Blvd, La Cienga Park, S Le Doux Rd, Gregory Way, S Robertson Blvd, Whitworth Dr, Beverly Green Dr, 1271 Beverly Green Dr-1333 Beverly Green Dr, Heath Ave, S Moreno Dr, Highway 2, Century Park W, W Pico Blvd, Patricia Ave, Lorenzo Pl, Monte Mar Dr, Beverwill Dr, Castle Heights Ave, Club Dr, McConnell Dr, National Blvd, Palms Blvd, Overland Ave, Venice Blvd, Highway 405, W Havelock Ave, S St Nicholas Ave, Ballona Creek, and Centinela Creek Channel.

The 37th, 34th and 42nd are partitioned by Crenshaw Blvd, W Pico Blvd, S Normandie Ave, Highway 10, Harbor Freeway, E 7th St, S Alameda St, S Alameda St, E Slauson Ave, S Central Ave, Firestone Blvd-E 90 St.

The 37th and 43rd are partitioned by E 91st St, McKinley Ave, E 88th Pl, Avalon Blvd, E Manchester Ave, S Normandie Ave, W 94th Pl, S Halldale Ave, W Century Blvd, La Salle Ave/S Denker Ave, W 104th St, S Western Ave, W 108th St, S Gramercy Pl, S Van Ness Ave, W 76th St, 8th Ave, W 79th St, S Victoria Ave, W 74th St, West Blvd, W 64th St, S La Brea Ave, 6231 S La Brea Ave-Flight Ave, W 64th St, 6404 S Springpark Ave-W Fairview Blvd, and W Centinela Ave.

=== Cities and CDPs with 10,000 or more people ===
- Los Angeles – 3,898,747
- Culver City – 40,779
- View Park-Windsor Hills – 11,419

=== 2,500 – 10,000 people ===
- Ladera Heights – 6,654

== List of members representing the district ==
Member	Party	Dates	Cong ress(es)	Electoral history	Counties
District created January 3, 1963
Lionel Van Deerlin (San Diego)	Democratic	January 3, 1963 – January 3, 1973	88th 89th 90th 91st 92nd	Elected in 1962. Re-elected in 1964. Re-elected in 1966. Re-elected in 1968. Re-elected in 1970. Redistricted to the 41st district.	1963–1969; San Diego (City of San Diego)
Lionel Van Deerlin (San Diego)	Democratic	January 3, 1963 – January 3, 1973	88th 89th 90th 91st 92nd	Elected in 1962. Re-elected in 1964. Re-elected in 1966. Re-elected in 1968. Re-elected in 1970. Redistricted to the 41st district.	1969–1973; Eastern/Southern San Diego
Yvonne Brathwaite Burke (Los Angeles)	Democratic	January 3, 1973 – January 3, 1975	93rd	Elected in 1972. Redistricted to the 28th district.	1973–1975; Los Angeles
Jerry Pettis (Lomda Linda)	Republican	January 3, 1975 – February 14, 1975	94th	Redistricted from the 33rd district. Elected in 1974. Died.	1975–1983; Riverside, San Bernardino
Vacant		February 14, 1975 – April 29, 1975	94th		1975–1983; Riverside, San Bernardino
Shirley Neil Pettis (Loma Linda)	Republican	April 29, 1975 – January 3, 1979	94th 95th	Elected to finish Pettis's term. Re-elected in 1976. Retired.	1975–1983; Riverside, San Bernardino
Jerry Lewis (San Bernardino)	Republican	January 3, 1979 – January 3, 1983	96th 97th	Elected in 1978. Re-elected in 1980. Redistricted to the 35th district.	1975–1983; Riverside, San Bernardino
Al McCandless (La Quinta)	Republican	January 3, 1983 – January 3, 1993	98th 99th 100th 101st 102nd	Elected in 1982. Re-elected in 1984. Re-elected in 1986. Re-elected in 1988. Re-elected in 1990. Redistricted to the 44th district.	1983–1993; Riverside
Walter R. Tucker III (Compton)	Democratic	January 3, 1993 – December 15, 1995	103rd 104th	Elected in 1992. Re-elected in 1994. Resigned.	1993–2003; Los Angeles (Compton, Carson, Long Beach)
Vacant		December 15, 1995 – March 26, 1996	104th		1993–2003; Los Angeles (Compton, Carson, Long Beach)
Juanita Millender-McDonald (Carson)	Democratic	March 26, 1996 – April 22, 2007	104th 105th 106th 107th 108th 109th 110th	Elected to finish Tucker's term. Re-elected in 1996. Re-elected in 1998. Re-elected in 2000. Re-elected in 2002. Re-elected in 2004. Re-elected in 2006. Died.	1993–2003; Los Angeles (Compton, Carson, Long Beach)
Juanita Millender-McDonald (Carson)	Democratic	March 26, 1996 – April 22, 2007	104th 105th 106th 107th 108th 109th 110th	Elected to finish Tucker's term. Re-elected in 1996. Re-elected in 1998. Re-elected in 2000. Re-elected in 2002. Re-elected in 2004. Re-elected in 2006. Died.	2003–2013 Los Angeles (Compton, Carson, Long Beach)
Vacant		April 22, 2007 – August 21, 2007	110th		2003–2013 Los Angeles (Compton, Carson, Long Beach)
Laura Richardson (Long Beach)	Democratic	August 21, 2007 – January 3, 2013	110th 111th 112th	Elected to finish McDonald's term. Re-elected in 2008. Re-elected in 2010. Redistricted to the 44th district and lost re-election.	2003–2013 Los Angeles (Compton, Carson, Long Beach)
Karen Bass (Los Angeles)	Democratic	January 3, 2013 – December 9, 2022	113th 114th 115th 116th 117th	Redistricted from the 33rd district and re-elected in 2012. Re-elected in 2014. Re-elected in 2016. Re-elected in 2018. Re-elected in 2020. Resigned when elected mayor of Los Angeles.	2013–2023 West Los Angeles (Crenshaw, and Culver City)
Vacant		December 9, 2022 – January 3, 2023	117th		2013–2023 West Los Angeles (Crenshaw, and Culver City)
Sydney Kamlager-Dove (Los Angeles)	Democratic	January 3, 2023 – present	118th 119th	Elected in 2022. Re-elected in 2024. Re-elected in 2026.	2023–present West Los Angeles (Crenshaw, and Culver City)

== Election results ==
=== 1962 ===
1962 United States House of Representatives elections in California
Party	Candidate	Votes	%
Democratic	Lionel Van Deerlin (Incumbent)	63,821	51.4
Republican	Dick Wilson	60,460	48.6
Total votes		124,281	100.0
Democratic win (new seat)			

=== 1964 ===
1964 United States House of Representatives elections in California
Party	Candidate	Votes	%
Democratic	Lionel Van Deerlin (Incumbent)	85,624	58.2
Republican	Dick Wilson	61,373	41.8
Total votes		146,997	100.0
Democratic hold			

=== 1966 ===
1966 United States House of Representatives elections in California
Party	Candidate	Votes	%
Democratic	Lionel Van Deerlin (Incumbent)	80,060	61.2
Republican	Samuel S. Vener	50,817	38.8
Total votes		130,877	100.0
Democratic hold			

=== 1968 ===
1968 United States House of Representatives elections in California
Party	Candidate	Votes	%
Democratic	Lionel Van Deerlin (Incumbent)	95,591	64.7
Republican	Mike Schaefer	52,212	35.3
Total votes		147,803	100.0
Democratic hold			

=== 1970 ===
1970 United States House of Representatives elections in California
Party	Candidate	Votes	%
Democratic	Lionel Van Deerlin (Incumbent)	93,952	72.1
Republican	James B. Kuhn	31,968	24.5
American Independent	Faye B. Brice	2,962	2.3
Peace and Freedom	Fritjof Thygeson	1,386	1.1
Total votes		130,268	100.0
Democratic hold			

=== 1972 ===
1972 United States House of Representatives elections in California
Party	Candidate	Votes	%
Democratic	Yvonne Brathwaite Burke	120,392	73.2
Republican	Greg Tria	40,633	24.7
Peace and Freedom	John Hagg	3,485	2.1
Total votes		164,510	100.0
Democratic hold			

=== 1974 ===
1974 United States House of Representatives elections in California
Party	Candidate	Votes	%
Republican	Jerry Pettis (Incumbent)	88,548	63.2
Democratic	Bobby Ray Vincent	46,449	32.9
American Independent	John H. Ortman	5,522	3.9
Total votes		140,519	100.0
Republican hold			

=== 1975 (Special) ===
1975 California's 37th congressional district special election
Party	Candidate	Votes	%
Republican	Shirley Neil Pettis	53,165	60.5
Democratic	Ron Pettis	12,940	14.7
Democratic	James L. Mayfield	11,140	12.7
Republican	Frank M. Bogert	4,773	5.4
American Independent	Bernard Wahl	1,378	1.6
Democratic	Joe E. Hubbs, Sr.	1,104	1.3
Republican	Louis Martinez	871	1.0
Republican	Jack H. Harrison	688	0.8
Republican	Bud Mathewson	555	0.6
Democratic	Clodeon Speed Adkins	488	0.6
Democratic	C. L. "Jimmie" James	308	0.3
Democratic	Richard "Doc" Welby	291	0.3
Republican	Robert J. Allenthorp	181	0.2
Total votes		88,882	100.0
Republican hold			

=== 1976 ===
1976 United States House of Representatives elections in California
Party	Candidate	Votes	%
Republican	Shirley Neil Pettis (Incumbent)	133,634	71.1
Democratic	Douglas C. Nilson Jr.	49,021	26.1
American Independent	Bernard Wahl	5,352	2.8
Total votes		188,007	100.0
Republican hold			

=== 1978 ===
1978 United States House of Representatives elections in California
Party	Candidate	Votes	%
Republican	Jerry Lewis	106,581	61.4
Democratic	Dan Corcoran	60,463	34.8
American Independent	Bernard Wahl	6,544	3.8
Total votes		173,588	100.0
Republican hold			

=== 1980 ===
1980 United States House of Representatives elections in California
Party	Candidate	Votes	%
Republican	Jerry Lewis (Incumbent)	165,371	71.6
Democratic	Donald M. "Don" Rusk	58,091	25.1
Libertarian	Larry Morris	7,615	3.3
Total votes		231,077	100.0
Republican hold			

=== 1982 ===
1982 United States House of Representatives elections in California
Party	Candidate	Votes	%
Republican	Al McCandless	105,065	59.1
Democratic	Curtis R. "Sam" Cross	68,510	38.5
Libertarian	Marc R. Wruble	4,297	2.4
Total votes		177,872	100.0
Republican hold			

=== 1984 ===
1984 United States House of Representatives elections in California
Party	Candidate	Votes	%
Republican	Al McCandless (Incumbent)	149,955	63.6
Democratic	David E. "Dave" Skinner	85,908	36.4
Total votes		245,863	100.0
Republican hold			

=== 1986 ===
1986 United States House of Representatives elections in California
Party	Candidate	Votes	%
Republican	Al McCandless (Incumbent)	122,416	63.7
Democratic	David E. "Dave" Skinner	69,808	36.3
Total votes		192,224	100.0
Republican hold			

=== 1988 ===
1988 United States House of Representatives elections in California
Party	Candidate	Votes	%
Republican	Al McCandless (Incumbent)	174,284	64.3
Democratic	Johnny Pearson	89,666	33.1
Libertarian	Bonnie Flickinger	7,169	2.6
Independent	Write-ins	123	0.0
Total votes		271,242	100.0
Republican hold			

=== 1990 ===
1990 United States House of Representatives elections in California
Party	Candidate	Votes	%
Republican	Al McCandless (Incumbent)	115,469	49.7
Democratic	Ralph Waite	103,961	44.8
American Independent	Gary R. Odom	6,474	2.8
Libertarian	Bonnie Flickinger	6,178	2.7
Total votes		232,082	100.0
Republican hold			

=== 1992 ===
1992 United States House of Representatives elections in California
Party	Candidate	Votes	%
Democratic	Walter R. Tucker III (Incumbent)	97,159	85.7
Peace and Freedom	B. Kwaku Duren	16,178	14.3
Total votes		113,337	100.0
Democratic hold			

=== 1994 ===
1994 United States House of Representatives elections in California
Party	Candidate	Votes	%
Democratic	Walter R. Tucker III (Incumbent)	64,166	77.4
Libertarian	Guy Wilson	18,502	22.3
Independent	Lewis B Prulitsky (write-in)	263	0.3
Total votes		82,931	100.0
Democratic hold			

=== 1996 (Special) ===
1996 California's 37th congressional district special election
Party	Candidate	Votes	%
Democratic	Juanita Millender-McDonald	13,868	27.3
Democratic	Willard H. Murray, Jr.	10,396	20.4
Democratic	Omar Bradley	6,975	13.7
Democratic	Paul H. Richards	6,035	11.9
Democratic	Robert M. Saucedo	4,495	8.8
Democratic	Charles Davis	2,555	5.0
Democratic	Murry J. Carter	1,574	3.1
Democratic	Joyce Harris	1,322	2.6
Democratic	Robin Tucker	3,661	1.0
Total votes		62,344	100.0
Turnout			30.9
Democratic hold			

=== 1996 ===
1996 United States House of Representatives elections in California
Party	Candidate	Votes	%
Democratic	Juanita Millender-McDonald (Incumbent)	87,247	85.0
Republican	Michael Voetee	15,339	15.0
Total votes		102,586	100.0
Democratic hold			

=== 1998 ===
1998 United States House of Representatives elections in California
Party	Candidate	Votes	%
Democratic	Juanita Millender-McDonald (Incumbent)	70,026	85.1
Republican	Saul E. Lankster	12,301	14.9
Total votes		82,327	100.0
Democratic hold			

=== 2000 ===
2000 United States House of Representatives elections in California
Party	Candidate	Votes	%
Democratic	Juanita Millender-McDonald (Incumbent)	93,269	82.4
Republican	Vernon Van	12,762	11.3
Natural Law	Margaret Glazer	4,094	3.6
Libertarian	Herb Peters	3,150	2.7
Total votes		113,275	100.0
Democratic hold			

=== 2002 ===
2002 United States House of Representatives elections in California
Party	Candidate	Votes	%
Democratic	Juanita Millender-McDonald (Incumbent)	63,445	73.0
Republican	Oscar A. Velasco	20,154	23.1
Libertarian	Herb Peters	3,413	3.9
Total votes		87,012	100.0
Democratic hold			

=== 2004 ===
2004 United States House of Representatives elections in California
Party	Candidate	Votes	%
Democratic	Juanita Millender-McDonald (Incumbent)	118,823	75.1
Republican	Vernon Van	31,960	20.2
Libertarian	Herb Peters	7,535	4.7
Total votes		158,318	100.0
Democratic hold			

=== 2006 ===
2006 United States House of Representatives elections in California
Party	Candidate	Votes	%
Democratic	Juanita Millender-McDonald (Incumbent)	80,716	82.4
Libertarian	Herb Peters	17,246	17.6
Total votes		97,962	100.0
Democratic hold			

=== 2007 (Special) ===
2007 California's 37th congressional district special election
Party	Candidate	Votes	%
Democratic	Laura Richardson	15,559	67.0
Republican	John Kanaley	5,837	25.2
Green	Daniel Brezenoff	1,274	5.5
Libertarian	Herb Peters	538	2.3
Independent	Lee Davis (write-in)	12	0.0
Independent	Christoper Remple (write-in)	1	0.0
Total votes		23,221	100.0
Turnout			8.6
Democratic hold			

=== 2008 ===
2008 United States House of Representatives elections in California
Party	Candidate	Votes	%
Democratic	Laura Richardson (Incumbent)	131,342	74.9
Independent	Nick Dibs	42,774	25.1
Total votes		175,252	100.0
Democratic hold			

=== 2010 ===
2010 United States House of Representatives elections in California
Party	Candidate	Votes	%
Democratic	Laura Richardson (Incumbent)	85,799	68.4
Republican	Star Parker	29,159	23.2
Independent	Nicholas Dibs	10,560	8.4
Total votes		125,518	100.0
Democratic hold			

=== 2012 ===
2012 United States House of Representatives elections in California
Party	Candidate	Votes	%
Democratic	Karen Bass (Incumbent)	207,039	86.4
Republican	Morgan Osborne	32,541	13.6
Total votes		239,580	100.0
Democratic hold			

=== 2014 ===
2014 United States House of Representatives elections in California
Party	Candidate	Votes	%
Democratic	Karen Bass (Incumbent)	96,787	84.3
Republican	R. Adam King	18,051	15.7
Total votes		114,838	100.0
Democratic hold			

=== 2016 ===
2016 United States House of Representatives elections in California
Party	Candidate	Votes	%
Democratic	Karen Bass (Incumbent)	192,490	81.1
Democratic	Chris Blake Wiggins	44,782	18.9
Total votes		237,272	100.0
Democratic hold			

=== 2018 ===
2018 United States House of Representatives elections in California
Party	Candidate	Votes	%
Democratic	Karen Bass (Incumbent)	210,555	89.1
Republican	Ron J. Bassilian	25,823	10.9
Total votes		236,378	100.0
Democratic hold			

=== 2020 ===
2020 United States House of Representatives elections in California
Party	Candidate	Votes	%
Democratic	Karen Bass (Incumbent)	254,916	85.9
Republican	Errol Webber	41,705	14.1
Total votes		296,621	100.0
Democratic hold			

=== 2022 ===
2022 United States House of Representatives elections in California
Party	Candidate	Votes	%
Democratic	Sydney Kamlager-Dove	84,338	64.0
Democratic	Jan Perry	47,542	36.0
Total votes		131,880	100.0
Democratic hold			

=== 2024 ===
California's 37th congressional district, 2024
Primary election
Party	Candidate	Votes	%
Democratic	Sydney Kamlager-Dove (incumbent)	62,413	71.8
No party preference	Juan Rey	8,917	10.3
Democratic	Adam Carmichael	7,520	8.7
Peace and Freedom	John Parker	7,316	8.4
Republican	Baltazar Fedalizo (write-in)	752	0.9
Total votes		86,918	100.0
General election
Democratic	Sydney Kamlager-Dove (incumbent)	160,364	78.3
No party preference	Juan Rey	44,450	21.7
Total votes		204,814	100.0
Democratic hold			

=== 2026 ===
California's 37th congressional district, 2026
Primary election
Party	Candidate	Votes	%
Democratic	Sydney Kamlager-Dove (incumbent)	70,990	55.2
Democratic	Samantha Mota	15,019	11.7
Republican	Baltazar Fedalizo	13,773	10.7
Democratic	Ryan Duckett	8,410	6.5
Democratic	Elizabeth Fenner	7,238	5.6
Democratic	Todd Lombardo	4,696	3.6
Independent	John Parker	4,005	3.1
Independent	Juan Rey	2,470	1.9
Independent	Steve Hill	2,059	1.6
Total votes		128,660	100.0
General election
Democratic	Sydney Kamlager-Dove (incumbent)		
Democratic	Samantha Mota		
Total votes			
Democratic hold			

== Historical district boundaries ==
From 2003 through 2013, the district consisted of central Los Angeles County, from Compton to Long Beach. Due to redistricting after the 2010 United States census, the district has moved northwest within Los Angeles County and includes Culver City and Inglewood.

== See also ==
- List of United States congressional districts
- California's congressional districts
