= Laura Richardson =

American politician (born 1962)

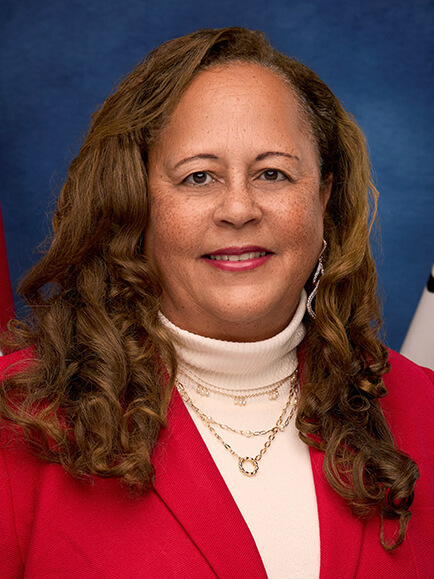
- Official portrait, 2024

Member of the California Senate from the 35th district
- Incumbent
- Assumed office December 2, 2024
- Preceded by: Steven Bradford

Member of the U.S. House of Representatives from California's 37th district
- In office August 21, 2007 – January 3, 2013 (Note: Richardson's official service begins on the date of the special election, while she was not sworn in until September 4, 2007.)
- Preceded by: Juanita Millender-McDonald
- Succeeded by: Janice Hahn (redistricted)

Member of the California State Assembly from the 55th district
- In office December 4, 2006 – September 4, 2007
- Preceded by: Jenny Oropeza
- Succeeded by: Warren Furutani

Personal details
- Born: April 14, 1962 (age 64) Los Angeles, California, U.S.
- Party: Democratic
- Education: University of California, Los Angeles (BA); University of Southern California (MBA)

Laura Richardson (born April 14, 1962) is an American politician who has served as a member of the California State Senate from the 35th district since 2024. A member of the Democratic Party, she previously served as the U.S. representative for California's 37th congressional district from 2007 to 2013.

She previously represented the 55th district in the California State Assembly for the 2007 term until she was elected to the House of Representatives for California's 37th congressional district in a special election on August 21, 2007, to fill the vacancy resulting from the death of Juanita Millender-McDonald. She was reelected to represent that district in 2008 and 2010. Following the decennial reorganization of Congressional districts in 2012, most of Richardson's territory became the 44th District. She ran against fellow Democratic Congresswoman Janice Hahn in the 2012 Congressional elections cycle. On November 6, 2012, she was defeated in her bid for re-election by Representative Hahn by a landslide 20 percentage points.

== Background ==
Richardson was born in Los Angeles and lives in Long Beach. She was raised by a single mother after her parents divorced when she was two. Her father was a member of the Teamsters. Her father was black and her mother was white. Richardson has said that racism against their mixed-race family was "what got me since the age of about six of wanting to be a public servant."

Richardson was previously married to Long Beach Police Chief Anthony Batts. During the marriage, she took the name Laura Richardson-Batts. She graduated with a bachelor's degree in political science from the University of California, Los Angeles in 1984. In 1987, she joined Xerox Corporation, where she worked for 14 years. In 1996, Richardson received her MBA from the University of Southern California's Marshall School of Business.

== Early political career ==
Richardson served on the Long Beach City Council from 2000 to 2006. In 2004, Richardson won a second term outright on the first ballot. As a councilwoman, she made statements that her priorities included neighborhood improvement, public safety, attracting jobs and businesses to the cities’ central corridors, job training programs for adults, after-school programs for youth and expanding senior programs.

Richardson established the Sixth District Master Plan, a strategic guideline for development in the area. Other significant accomplishments during her council tenure include securing the first funding for alley maintenance by the city of Long Beach, initiating the planning process for a Senior Transportation Program in the Central Area of Long Beach.

While serving on the city council, Richardson joined the staff of Lieutenant Governor Cruz Bustamante and served as his Southern California director for five years.

== California Assembly ==
Richardson served as the assistant speaker pro tempore in the Assembly. Richardson was the first African-American and South Bay representative to achieve this position. Additionally, Richardson was appointed to serve on the Budget, Human Services, Utilities & Commerce, Government Organization, and Joint Legislative Budget committees. She was chair of the Select Committee on Proposition 209-Equal Opportunity.

== U.S. House of Representatives ==
=== Committee assignments ===
- Committee on Homeland Security
  - Subcommittee on Cybersecurity, Infrastructure Protection, and Security Technologies
  - Subcommittee on Emergency Preparedness, Response, and Communications (Ranking Member)
- Committee on Transportation and Infrastructure
  - Subcommittee on Highways and Transit
  - Subcommittee on Railroads, Pipelines, and Hazardous Materials
  - Subcommittee on Water Resources and Environment

=== Caucuses ===
- Congressional Black Caucus
- Congressional Asian Pacific American Caucus (Associate Member)

== Political positions ==
=== Iraq War ===
In 2003, Richardson said she believed weapons inspections in Iraq should have continued, and that she did not favor an invasion. She was asked by anti-war groups to support a Long Beach City Council resolution declaring the city's opposition to the Iraq War. She did not support this resolution, but co-sponsored a resolution declaring support for local members of the National Guard. Once hostilities began, she stated that it was important to support the troops. She argued that once Saddam Hussein was caught and executed, American troops should have come home. She supports a withdrawal plan beginning in six months, according to her mailers, which often contain pictures of former president George W. Bush with a slash mark through his image, indicating her opposition to Bush's policies. She pledged to oppose any new spending for war in Iraq.

=== Prisons ===
Richardson supported AB 900 to create 40,000 more prison beds in California at the cost of $7.4 billion.

=== Environment ===
Richardson has faced some harsh scrutiny for not co-sponsoring Rep. Henry Waxman's global warming legislation. As a result, Greenpeace has mounted a public awareness campaign about her position.

=== Immigration ===
Richardson does not support building a border fence. She does support some path to citizenship for certain illegal immigrants.

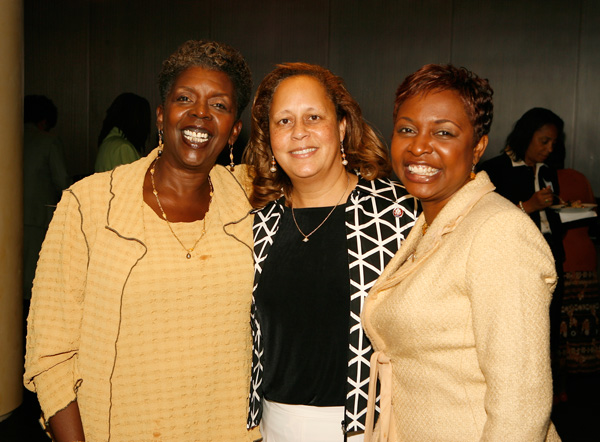
Laura Richardson (center) with fellow congresswomen Stephanie Tubbs Jones of Ohio (left) and Yvette Clarke of New York (right).

=== 2008 presidential race ===
Laura Richardson endorsed Hillary Clinton in the 2008 Democratic presidential primaries, although her district voted for 54.2% to 43.5% in favor of Barack Obama.

=== FISA Amendments Act ===
Richardson voted in favor of a controversial update to the Foreign Intelligence Surveillance Act on June 20, 2008. As part of the bill, telecommunications companies that have allegedly acted illegally in allowing the Bush Administration to spy on customers will be protected from prosecution. The administration's surveillance of U.S. citizens and residents is part of the NSA warrantless surveillance controversy.

== Political campaigns ==
In the run up to the 2008 election, Richardson came under fire for sending out an anti-LGBTQ mailer against a lesbian candidate in 1996 during her run for the 54th Assembly District, accusing her opponent of being, "committed to a radical gay rights agenda. Despite the controversy, Richardson defeated State Senator Jenny Oropeza and 9 other Democrats in the June 26 primary election to win her party's nomination, the real contest in this heavily Democratic district. On August 21, Richardson won more than 65% of the vote in a four-way race against the nominees of the Republican Party, Green Party, and Libertarian Party. She easily won a full term in 2008, and was reelected in 2010, in both cases against only nominal Republican opposition

Redistricting for the 2012 elections significantly altered California's congressional map. Richardson had previously represented portions of inland Los Angeles and inland Long Beach, all of Carson, Compton and Signal Hill, as well as parts of other municipalities. However, her old district was split almost in half, with the bulk of her territory becoming the 44th District. While Richardson's home in Long Beach was drawn into the new 47th District, she moved her residence into the 44th district because its demographics were more similar to the old 37th; like the 44th, it is majority black and Latino. Fellow Democrat Janice Hahn, who had previously represented the neighboring 36th District, had her home drawn into the 44th as well. The California Democratic Party endorsed Hahn for the seat. In the all-party primary, Hahn defeated Richardson with 60 percent of the vote to Richardson's 39 percent—which was all the more remarkable since, on paper, the district's demographics were more favorable to Richardson.

On November 6, 2012, Hahn easily beat Richardson by 20 percentage points.

== Controversies ==
Richardson was accused of receiving preferential treatment by a bank when it rescinded an erroneous foreclosure of her house, but was cleared of wrongdoing by the House Ethics Committee, in accordance with the recommendations of the Office of Congressional Ethics. Upon the death of Juanita Millender-McDonald, her predecessor in the 37th Congressional District, Richardson seems to have put all of her funds into winning the resulting special election, and as a result stopped paying her mortgages. Following the special election, she made agreements with Washington Mutual to catch up payments on her 3 properties, but the bank violated this agreement with regard to the Sacramento property when it foreclosed on the house. The bank then rescinded the foreclosure, causing the controversy.

After her election to the California Assembly, Richardson purchased a home in Sacramento with no money down and a subprime mortgage. According to county records, Richardson received a default notice and Notice of Trustee's Sale in late 2007. In December 2007, Richardson was behind in payments by more than $18,000. According to the couple that sold the home to Richardson, Richardson was not maintaining the home. Sharon Helmar has stated: "The neighbors are extremely unhappy with her. She didn't mow the lawn or take out the garbage while she was there. We lived there for a long time, 30 years, and we had to hide our heads whenever we came back to the neighborhood."

The real estate broker who bought Richardson's Sacramento house at the foreclosure sale accused her of receiving preferential treatment because her lender had issued a notice to rescind the sale. James York, owner of Red Rock Mortgage, said he would file a lawsuit against Richardson and her lender, Washington Mutual, but settled out of court with the terms not disclosed. Richardson had not been making payments on the property for nearly a year, and had also gone into default on her two other houses in Long Beach and San Pedro. Richardson, D-Long Beach, has said that the auction should never have been held, because she had worked out a loan modification agreement with her lender beforehand and had begun making payments.

The House Ethics Committee, following the recommendations of the Ethics Office, found no wrongdoing other than by Richardson's Mortgage Broker, who was referred to the Justice Department for mortgage fraud, which was widespread at the time the mortgage was made. Mistaken foreclosures despite paid-up recovery agreements, such as the one that happened to Richardson, were also becoming rampant during this period.

Richardson also initially did not disclose a loan from a strip club owner when on the City Council, public records show.

Richardson was speaker of the House pro tempore during the November 29, 2010 lame-duck session of Congress. She initially refused to recognize, then relented to allow committee ranking member Steve Buyer to talk despite the failure of the committee chairman to appear. She was seen discussing with the House parliamentarian and aides how to handle the failure of the committee chairman to appear to present his bill under rules and procedures that minorities in both parties have often denounced when out of power in the House, as Boyer did when recognized in this instance.

On November 3, 2011, the Los Angeles Times reported that Richardson would face an ethics inquiry related to possible illegal use of staffers.

On November 4, 2011, Richardson claimed that the House Ethics Committee, composed of five members from the Democratic Party and five members from Republican Party, singled her out for investigation because she is African-American. The Ethics Committee leaders did announce that the vote to establish a four-member investigative subcommittee was unanimous.

=== Decisions of House committee and full House ===
On August 1, 2012, the House Ethics Committee issued its report about accusations of improper use of staff. It found that Richardson had broken federal law, violated House rules and obstructed the Committee's own investigation. She was found guilty on seven counts of violating House rules by improperly pressuring her staff to campaign for her, destroying evidence and tampering with witness testimony. Richardson was ordered to pay a fine of $10,000 within four months and promised to require staffers who work on her campaign to sign a waiver stating that they haven't been pressured to do so. The committee also called on the full House to reprimand Richardson.

The following day, the full House duly voted to accept the Committee report and reprimand Richardson.

== Electoral history ==
=== California State Assembly ===
2006 California State Assembly 55th district election
Primary election
Party	Candidate	Votes	%
Democratic	Laura Richardson	13,551	54.2
Democratic	Warren Furutani	11,492	45.8
Total votes		25,043	100.0
General election
Democratic	Laura Richardson	50,006	68.2
Republican	Margherita Palumbo Underhill	23,421	31.8
Total votes		73,427	100.0
Democratic hold			

=== U.S. House of Representatives ===
2007 California's 37th congressional district special election
Primary election
Party	Candidate	Votes	%
Democratic	Laura Richardson	11,956	43.2
Democratic	Jenny Oropeza	9,960	36.0
Democratic	Valerie McDonald	3,027	10.9
Democratic	Peter Mathews	1,125	4.1
Democratic	Albert Robles (write-in)	363	1.3
Democratic	Ed Wilson	362	1.3
Democratic	George A. Parmer, Jr.	242	0.9
Democratic	Lee Davis	202	0.7
Democratic	Jeffrey S. Price	142	0.5
Democratic	Bill Francisco Grisolia	141	0.5
Democratic	Felicia Ford	122	0.4
Democratic	Marvin Evans	29	0.1
Total votes		27,671	100.0
General election
Democratic	Laura Richardson	15,559	67.0
Republican	John Kanaley	5,837	25.1
Green	Daniel Brezenoff	1,274	5.5
Libertarian	Herb Peters	538	2.3
Independent	Lee Davis (write-in)	12	0.1
Independent	Christopher Remple (write-in)	1	0.0
Total votes		23,221	100.0
Democratic hold			

2008 California's 37th congressional district election
Primary election
Party	Candidate	Votes	%
Democratic	Laura Richardson (incumbent)	25,713	74.5
Democratic	Peter Mathews	5,860	16.9
Democratic	Lee Davis	2,983	8.6
Total votes		34,556	100.0
General election
Democratic	Laura Richardson (incumbent)	131,342	75.0
Independent	Nicholas Dibs	42,774	24.4
Democratic	Peter Mathews (write-in)	600	0.3
Republican	June Viena Pouesi (write-in)	526	0.3
Democratic	Lee Davis (write-in)	10	0.0
Total votes		175,252	100.0
Democratic hold			

2010 California's 37th congressional district election
Primary election
Party	Candidate	Votes	%
Democratic	Laura Richardson (incumbent)	22,574	67.4
Democratic	Peter Mathews	6,144	18.4
Democratic	Lee Davis	2,848	8.4
Democratic	Terrance Ponchak	1,955	5.8
Total votes		33,521	100.0
General election
Democratic	Laura Richardson (incumbent)	85,799	68.4
Republican	Star Parker	29,159	23.2
Independent	Nicholas Dibs	10,560	8.4
Total votes		125,518	100.0
Democratic hold			

2012 California's 44th congressional district election
Primary election
Party	Candidate	Votes	%
Democratic	Janice Hahn (incumbent)	24,843	60.1
Democratic	Laura Richardson (incumbent)	16,523	39.9
Total votes		41,366	100.0
General election
Democratic	Janice Hahn (incumbent)	99,909	60.2
Democratic	Laura Richardson (incumbent)	65,989	39.8
Total votes		165,898	100.0
Democratic hold			

=== California State Senate ===
2024 California State Senate 35th district election
Primary election
Party	Candidate	Votes	%
Democratic	Laura Richardson	26,916	27.8
Democratic	Michelle Chambers	23,670	24.5
Republican	James Spencer	18,193	18.8
Democratic	Albert Robles	8,263	8.5
Democratic	Alex Monteiro	5,840	6.0
Democratic	Jennifer Trichelle-Marie Williams	5,242	5.4
Democratic	Nilo Vega Michelin	4,628	4.8
Democratic	Lamar Lyons	3,959	4.1
Total votes		96,711	100.0
General election
Democratic	Laura Richardson	122,862	50.6
Democratic	Michelle Chambers	120,144	49.4
Total votes		243,006	100.0
Democratic hold			

== See also ==
- List of African-American United States representatives
- Women in the United States House of Representatives
- List of United States representatives expelled, censured, or reprimanded
- List of American federal politicians convicted of crimes
- List of federal political scandals in the United States

U.S. House of Representatives
Preceded by Juanita Millender-McDonald	Member of the U.S. House of Representatives from California's 37th congressional district 2007–2013	Succeeded by Karen Bass
U.S. order of precedence (ceremonial)
Preceded by Doug Ose as Former U.S. Representative	Order of precedence of the United States as Former U.S. Representative	Succeeded by Paul Cook as Former U.S. Representative
