= Juanita Millender-McDonald =

American politician (1938–2007)

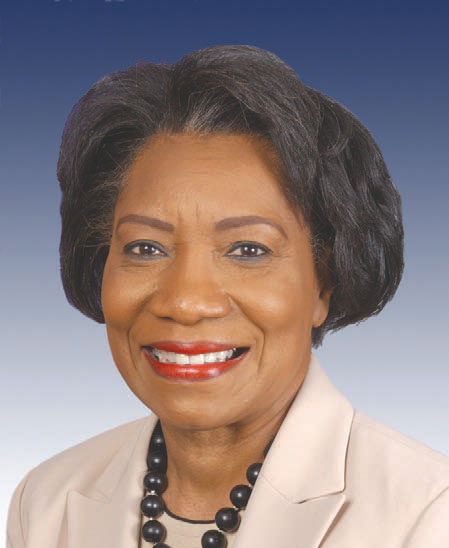

Chair of the House Administration Committee
- In office January 3, 2007 – April 21, 2007
- Preceded by: Vern Ehlers
- Succeeded by: Bob Brady

Member of the U.S. House of Representatives from California's 37th district
- In office March 26, 1996 – April 22, 2007 (Note: Millender-McDonald's official service begins on the date of the special election, while she was not sworn in until April 16, 1996.)
- Preceded by: Walter Tucker
- Succeeded by: Laura Richardson

Member of the California State Assembly from the 55th district
- In office December 7, 1992 – April 15, 1996
- Preceded by: Richard Polanco
- Succeeded by: Richard Floyd

Personal details
- Born: Juanita Millender; September 7, 1938 Birmingham, Alabama, U.S.
- Died: April 22, 2007 (aged 68) Carson, California, U.S.
- Party: Democratic
- Spouse(s): James McDonald, Jr.
- Children: 5
- Education: Los Angeles Harbor College (attended); University of Redlands (BA); California State University, Los Angeles (MA); University of Southern California (PhD)

Juanita Millender-McDonald (September 7, 1938 – April 22, 2007) was an American politician who served as a member of the United States House of Representatives from 1996 until her death in 2007, representing California's 37th congressional district, which includes most of South Central Los Angeles and the city of Long Beach, California. She was a member of the Democratic Party.

On December 19, 2006, Millender-McDonald was named Chairwoman of the House Committee on House Administration for the 110th Congress. She was the first African-American woman to chair the committee. She was also a member of the Congressional Black Caucus and of the New Democrat Coalition and was considered a front-runner for the job of Secretary of Transportation if John Kerry had been elected president in 2004.

== Biography ==
Millender-McDonald was born in Birmingham, Alabama. She was educated at Los Angeles Harbor College; at the University of Redlands, from which she received a business degree; and at California State University, Los Angeles, from which she earned a master's degree in educational administration; and the University of Southern California, from which she completed her doctorate in public administration.

She worked as a teacher, a textbook editor, and later as director of a nonprofit organization working for gender issues. She was a member of Alpha Kappa Alpha sorority. Millender-McDonald served as a member of the City Council of Carson, California and was a member of the California State Assembly (after beating two sitting incumbent Democrats that had been reapportioned into the same Carson based assembly district in 1992) before entering the House.

=== Congress ===
She was first elected to the House in a March 1996 special election to replace Congressman Walter Tucker, who resigned due to corruption charges and was later sentenced to 27 months in prison. While she won a difficult nine-candidate primary in her first election run (fellow Assembly member Willard Murray came in a close second) she did not face any serious opposition in any of her reelection campaigns.

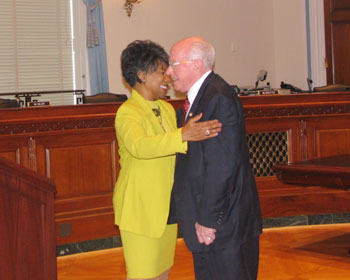
Ranking member Millender-McDonald is greeted by Chairman Vern Ehlers at a hearing of the House Administration Committee.

In Congress, she was known for her commitment to protecting international human rights. Millender-McDonald worked to aid victims of genocide and human trafficking. In 1996, she also led an inquiry into allegations that the CIA was working with cocaine traffickers to fund Contra rebels in Nicaragua.

=== Death ===
Within a week of her requesting a leave of absence to deal with her illness, on April 22, 2007, Millender-McDonald died in hospice care, succumbing to colon cancer at the age of 68 at her home in Carson. She left a husband, James McDonald, Jr., and five adult children.

== Successor ==
Congresswoman Millender-McDonald's seat was vacant until Laura Richardson won the August 21, 2007, special election. Under California law, Governor Arnold Schwarzenegger announced a special election date of June 26, and because no candidate received more than 50% of the total vote, the candidates with the most votes in their respective parties participated in an August 21 runoff. In the June primary, State Senator Jenny Oropeza lost to State Assemblywoman Laura Richardson, with Richardson continuing to the August special election, when she defeated Republican John M. Kanaley, Libertarian Herb Peters, and Green Daniel Brezenoff.

== Electoral history ==
California's 37th congressional district: Results 1996–2006
| Year | Democrat | Votes | Pct | Republican | Votes | Pct | 3rd Party | Party | Votes | Pct | |
|---|---|---|---|---|---|---|---|---|---|---|---|
| 1996 | Juanita Millender-McDonald | 87,247 | 85% | Michael E. Voetee | 15,399 | 15% | | | | | |
| 1998 | Juanita Millender-McDonald | 70,026 | 85% | Saul E. Lankster | 12,301 | 15% | | | | | |
| 2000 | Juanita Millender-McDonald | 93,269 | 82% | Vernon Van | 12,762 | 11% | Margaret Glazer | Natural Law | 4,094 | 4% | * |
| 2002 | Juanita Millender-McDonald | 63,445 | 73% | Oscar A. Velasco | 20,154 | 23% | Herb Peters | Libertarian | 3,413 | 4% | |
| 2004 | Juanita Millender-McDonald | 118,823 | 75% | Vernon Van | 31,960 | 20% | Herb Peters | Libertarian | 7,535 | 5% | |
| 2006 | Juanita Millender-McDonald | 80,716 | 82% | (no candidate) | | | Herb Peters | Libertarian | 17,246 | 18% | |

*Write-in and minor candidate notes: In 2000, Herb Peters received 3,150 votes.

== See also ==
- List of African-American United States representatives
- List of members of the United States Congress who died in office (2000–present)#2000s
- Women in the United States House of Representatives

U.S. House of Representatives
| Preceded by Walter Tucker | Member of the U.S. House of Representatives from California's 37th congressional district 1996–2007 | Succeeded by Laura Richardson |
| Preceded by John B. Larson | Ranking Member of the House Administration Committee; 2005–2007 | Succeeded by Vern Ehlers |
| Preceded by Vern Ehlers | Chair of the House Administration Committee; 2007 | Succeeded by Bob Brady |
