= Jenny Oropeza =

American politician (1957–2010)

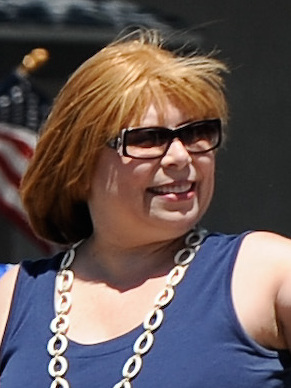

Member of the California State Senate from the 28th district
- In office December 4, 2006 – October 20, 2010
- Preceded by: Debra Bowen
- Succeeded by: Ted Lieu

Member of the California State Assembly from the 55th district
- In office December 4, 2000 – November 30, 2006
- Preceded by: Richard Floyd
- Succeeded by: Laura Richardson

Member of the Long Beach City Council from the 1st district
- In office July 15, 1994 – December 4, 2000
- Preceded by: Evan Anderson Braude
- Succeeded by: Bonnie Lowenthal

Personal details
- Born: Jennifer Ann Oropeza; September 27, 1957 Montebello, California, U.S.
- Died: October 20, 2010 (aged 53) Long Beach, California, U.S.
- Cause of death: Cancer
- Resting place: Forest Lawn Memorial Park Cemetery, Cypress, California, U.S.
- Party: Democratic
- Spouse: Thomas Mullins (m. 1977)
- Relatives: Lynne Oropeza (sister)
- Education: California State University, Long Beach (B.A. Business Administration)
- Occupation: Legislator
- Known for: Environmentalism, Public Health, Education policy, Alameda Corridor
- Committees: Senate Chair; Revenue and Taxation; Integrity of Elections; Public Health and the Environment; CA Latino Caucus on Environmental Justice Policy; Assembly Chair; Budget; Transportation

Jennifer Ann Oropeza (September 27, 1957 – October 20, 2010) was the California State Senator for the 28th district which included the cities of Carson, El Segundo, Hermosa Beach, Lomita, Manhattan Beach, Redondo Beach, and Torrance; the Los Angeles communities of Cheviot Hills, Bel Air, Harbor City, Harbor Gateway, Lennox, Mar Vista, Marina del Rey, Palms, Playa del Rey, Rancho Park, San Pedro, West Los Angeles, Westchester, Wilmington and Venice; and part of the city of Long Beach. (In 2012, as part of an overall redrawing of California district lines, this jurisdiction was redistricted into portions of both Districts 26 and 33.)

Oropeza was elected to her first term in the California State Senate in November 2006 and garnered 62 percent of the vote. She died less than two weeks before the November 2, 2010 election, in which she had been expected to easily win reelection. Her name remained on the ballot in the 28th Senate District. Oropeza posthumously won reelection on November 2, 2010.

She served in the California State Assembly for the six years (2000–2006) prior to her time in the Senate.

== Education ==
Oropeza graduated from Alhambra High School in 1975 and went on to earn a bachelor's degree in Business Administration from California State University, Long Beach. She began her career in public service as the first Latina student body president, and the first to serve two terms, at California State University, Long Beach. While still in college, she was appointed by then-governor Jerry Brown to the CSU system's Board of Trustees and served as the student member of the board.

== Early political career ==
Oropeza was the first Latina to serve as a member of the Long Beach Unified School District Board of Education and held office from 1988 to 1994. In 1994, she was elected the first Latina member of the Long Beach City Council and won re-election in 1998. As an MTA board member from 1996 through 2000, Oropeza represented the southeast cities of Los Angeles County and served on MTA's Planning and Programming and Construction committees. While with the MTA, she also chaired the Goods Movement Committee of the Southern California Association of Governments.

== Assembly Member ==
Oropeza was a member of the California State Assembly from 2000 to 2006 for the 55th Assembly District. In January 2002, with barely a year's experience in the Assembly, Oropeza was named chair of the Assembly Budget Committee — on the eve of the worst deficit in California history. She served two years. From 2004 to 2006, Oropeza chaired the Assembly Transportation Committee.

She was Vice Chair of the dual-house Latino Caucus. In 2005, the League of California Cities' Latino Caucus named her Legislator of the Year; in 2006, the Los Angeles League of Conservation Voters awarded her the Smith-Weiss Environmental Champion Award for her work on issues from air pollution and cancer prevention to radiation and environmental advocacy. She long supported transportation improvements, including Proposition 42 in 2002, which sought to dedicate a portion of gasoline taxes toward construction.

== California State Senate ==
=== Run for the State Senate ===
On June 6, 2006, Oropeza won a very close Democratic primary against former Assembly member George Nakano. Oropeza was endorsed by the California Democratic Party and the California League of Conservation Voters. Nakano had been endorsed by Congresswoman Jane Harman and California Assemblyman Ted Lieu. Oropeza captured 52.8% of the vote to Nakano's 47.2%.

=== Committees and caucuses ===
Oropeza chaired the Senate Revenue and Taxation Committee and was a member of the Appropriations; Transportation; and Elections, Reapportionment and Constitutional Amendments Committees. She also chaired the Select Committees on Integrity of Elections, and Public Health and the Environment. She was a member of the Select Committees on the Alameda Corridor and Asian Pacific Affairs. In addition, she was a member of the Senate Appropriations Subcommittee on Fiscal Oversight and Bonded Indebtedness, the Senate Subcommittee on California Ports and Goods Movement, as well as the Streamlined Sales Tax Project board of governance and the Commission on the Status of Women. As one of 26 Latinos in the Legislature, Oropeza chaired the California Latino Caucus Policy Committee on Environmental Justice.

=== Legislation ===
Upon election to the State Senate, Oropeza introduced 24 bills. The policy areas ranged from preventing smoking in cars while minors are present (SB 7) to increasing the efforts of the California State Controller to contact the owners of unclaimed property (SB 920). She introduced legislation in the areas of local sales, massage therapy, teacher credentials, and air pollution in ports.

== Death ==
In 2004 Oropeza was treated for liver cancer. She was admitted to Long Beach Memorial Medical Center for difficulty breathing, but later died there the evening of October 20, 2010. She had been undergoing treatment for a blood clot in her abdomen since May 2010. Oropeza was survived by her husband Tom Mullins, mother Sharon, sister Lynne, and brother John.

== Legacy ==
Since her death, Oropeza has been honored by the Democratic Women's Study Club in Long Beach (the oldest continually meeting chartered Democratic club west of the Mississippi), which posthumously awarded her the Political Leadership Award, which is now named the Jenny Oropeza Political Leadership Award. Centro CHA in Long Beach posthumously awarded Oropeza the Create Change Community Service Excellence Award, now known as the Create Change: Jenny Oropeza Community Service Excellence Award. The Long Beach Lambda Democratic Club created the Jenny Oropeza Ally of the Year Award, which like the other two awards, was first given in 2011.

As a tribute to Oropeza's dedication to fostering protections for key California-state public health programs, the Los Angeles County Affiliate of Susan G. Komen for the Cure, in joint collaboration with the six other California-based Komen Affiliates ("the California Collaborative"), established the Senator Jenny Oropeza Public Policy Internship position.

The Senator Jenny Oropeza Memorial Scholarship was established after her death, and is awarded annually at California State University, Long Beach to a student who is committed to a career in public service.

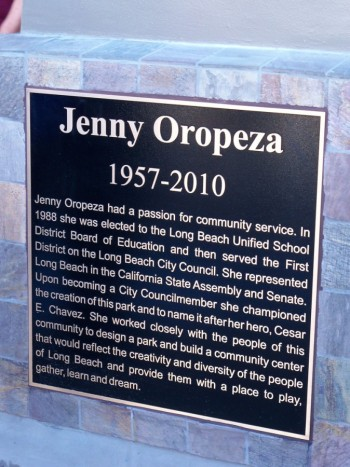
Dedication Plaque at Jenny Oropeza Community Center, Long Beach CA, 2011

On March 31, 2011 (birthday of Cesar E. Chavez), the City of Long Beach renamed the community center in Cesar E. Chavez Park the Jenny Oropeza Community Center. During her time on the Long Beach City Council, Jenny fought hard to develop and name the park in honor of labor leader and civil rights activist Cesar Chavez.

On December 8, 2011 the Los Angeles Unified School District dedicated the Jenny Oropeza Global Studies Academy. The Academy is one of four academies at the Rancho Dominguez Preparatory School.

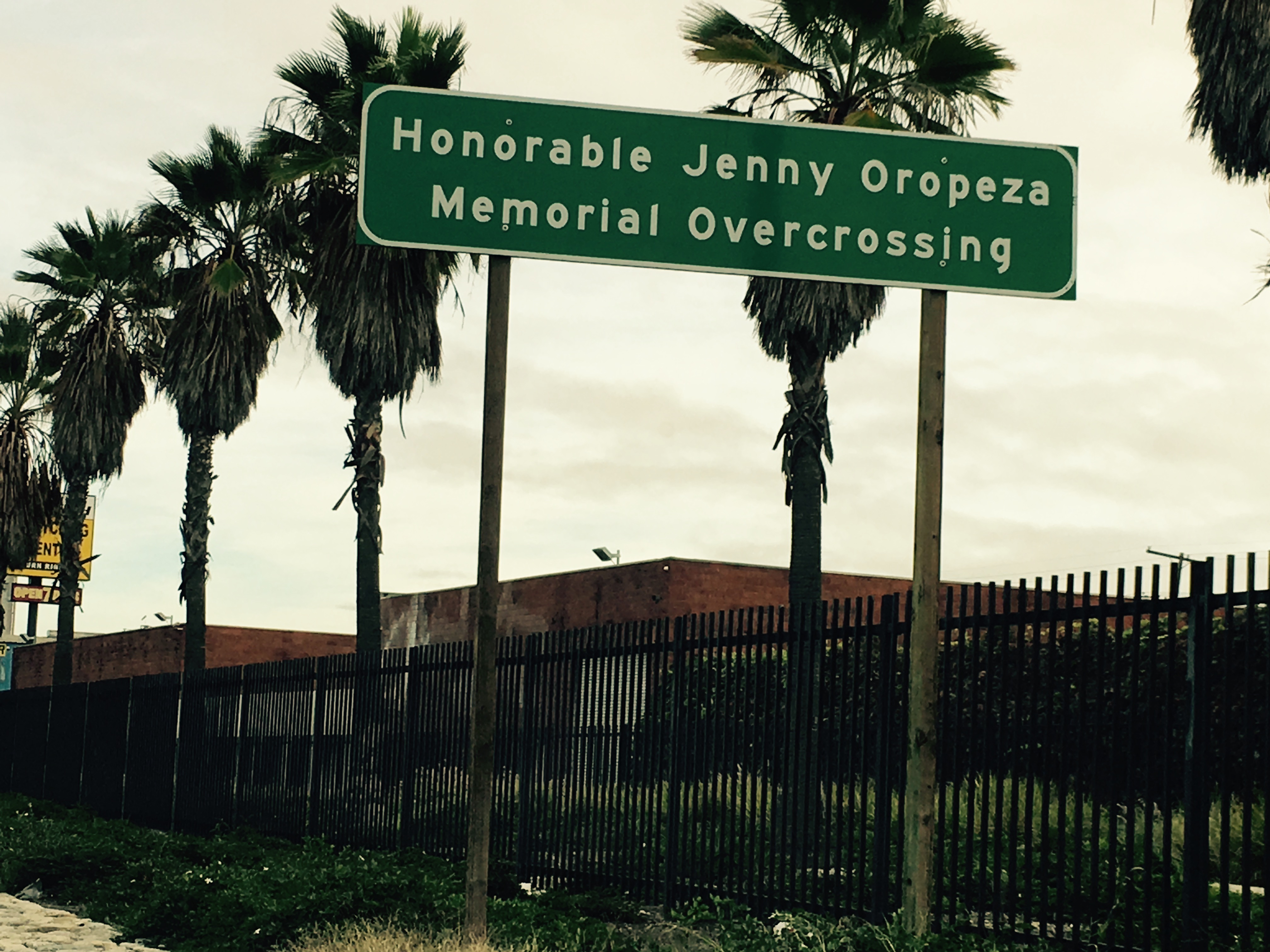
Sign at entrance to eastbound overcrossing on Pacific Coast Hwy. at Coil St. (S.E. corner), Wilmington, CA, 2016

In August 2012, in recognition of Oropeza's work to find the necessary funds to finance completion of a critical section of the Alameda Corridor project that had run out of money, the California Legislature approved the naming of the Honorable Jenny Oropeza Memorial Overcrossing for the section of Pacific Coast Highway in Wilmington that created the bridge that spans the Alameda Corridor. Oropeza successfully worked with Federal, State and local government entities, as well as the railroads and Metropolitan Transportation Authority to find the funds to construct this last and critical portion of the project.

On April 21, 2014, State Senator Ricardo Lara introduced Senate Concurrent Resolution 115 that would designate the portion of Interstate 710 Highway (known as the Long Beach Freeway) that runs between Pico Avenue and West Wardlow Road in the City of Long Beach as the Senator Jenny Oropeza Memorial Freeway. This legislation has yet to be completed.

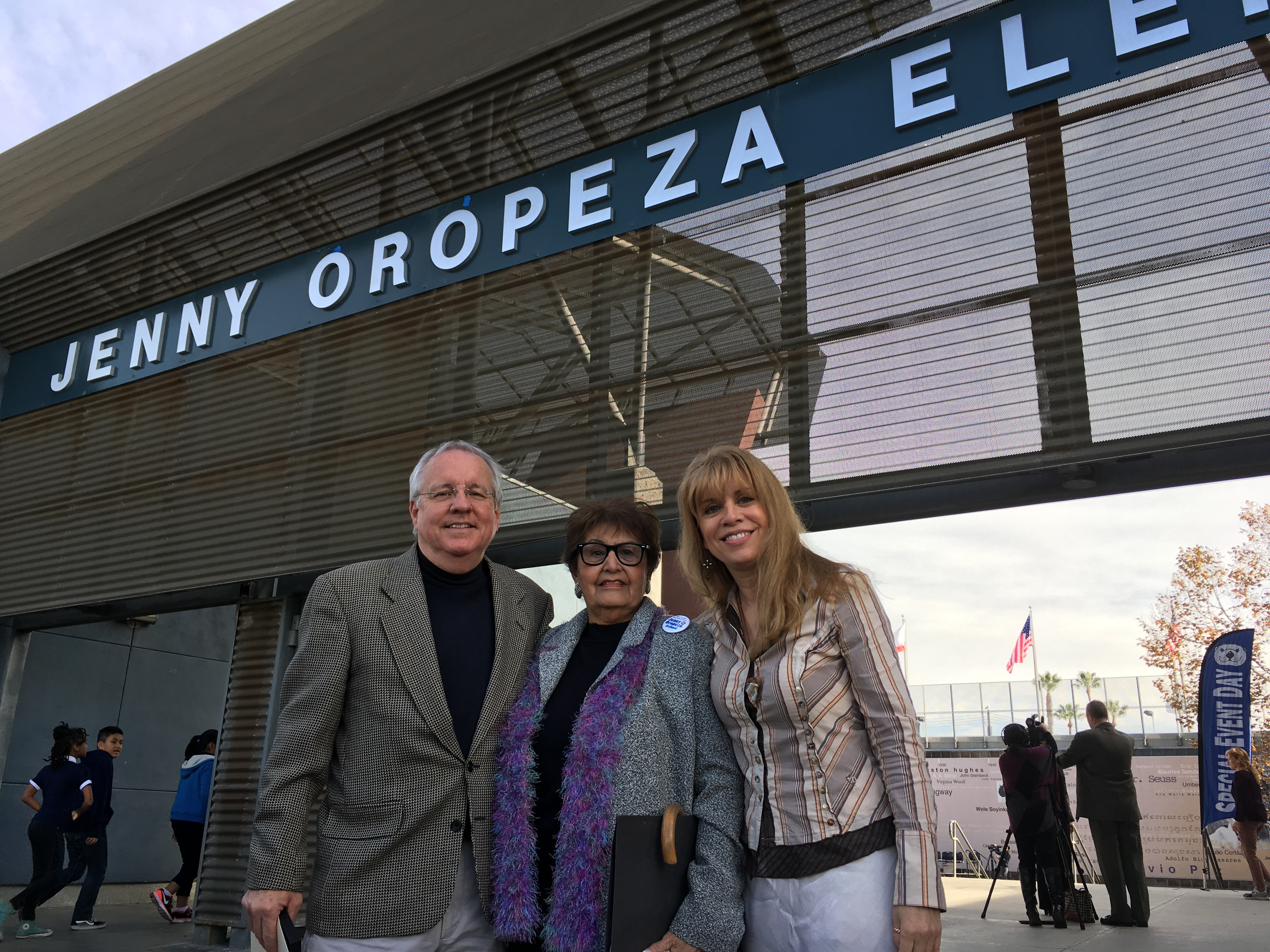
Jenny Oropeza Elementary School dedication, Long Beach, CA, 2016

In 2016, the Long Beach Unified School District Board of Education unanimously approved name changes for three schools, including International Elementary to be renamed Jenny Oropeza Elementary School, in honor of the former Long Beach Unified School District board member, Long Beach city councilmember, state assemblymember and state senator. The dedication ceremony took place on November 28, 2016. Oropeza, who died in 2010 at age 53, was the first Latina to serve on the Long Beach USD school board and the city council.

California Assembly
| Preceded by Richard Floyd | California State Assemblymember; 55th district December 4, 2000 – November 30, 2006 | Succeeded by Laura Richardson |
California Senate
| Preceded by Debra Bowen | California State Senator; 28th district December 4, 2006 – October 20, 2010 | Succeeded by Ted Lieu |
