= Jerry Lewis (California politician) =

American politician (1934–2021)

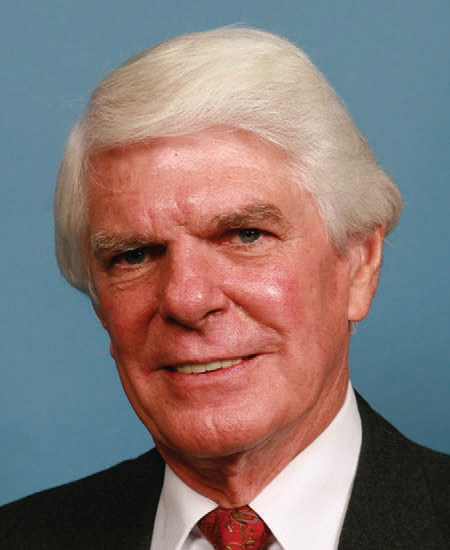

Ranking Member of the House Appropriations Committee
- In office January 3, 2007 – January 3, 2011
- Preceded by: Dave Obey
- Succeeded by: Norm Dicks

Chair of the House Appropriations Committee
- In office January 3, 2005 – January 3, 2007
- Preceded by: Bill Young
- Succeeded by: Dave Obey

Chair of the House Republican Conference
- In office January 3, 1989 – January 3, 1993
- Leader: Bob Michel
- Preceded by: Dick Cheney
- Succeeded by: Dick Armey

Chair of the House Republican Policy Committee
- In office June 4, 1987 – January 3, 1989
- Leader: Bob Michel
- Preceded by: Dick Cheney
- Succeeded by: Mickey Edwards

Chair of the House Republican Research Committee
- In office January 3, 1985 – June 4, 1987
- Leader: Bob Michel
- Preceded by: James G. Martin
- Succeeded by: Mickey Edwards

Member of the U.S. House of Representatives from California
- In office January 3, 1979 – January 3, 2013
- Preceded by: Shirley Neil Pettis
- Succeeded by: Paul Cook (redistricted)
- Constituency: 37th district (1979–1983); 35th district (1983–1993); 40th district (1993–2003); 41st district (2003–2013)

Member of the California Assembly
- In office January 6, 1969 – November 30, 1978
- Preceded by: L. Stewart Hinckley
- Succeeded by: Bill Leonard
- Constituency: 73rd district (1969–1975); 67th district (1975–1978)

Personal details
- Born: Charles Jeremy Lewis; October 21, 1934 Seattle, Washington, U.S.
- Died: July 15, 2021 (aged 86) Redlands, California, U.S.
- Party: Republican
- Spouse: Arlene Willis
- Education: University of California, Los Angeles (BA)
- Lewis's voice Lewis on the importance of bipartisan action after Hurricane Katrina. Recorded September 2, 2005

Charles Jeremy Lewis (October 21, 1934 – July 15, 2021) was an American politician who was a U.S. representative, last serving California's 41st congressional district. He was first elected to Congress in 1978, and previously represented the 40th, 35th, and 37th districts. A Republican, he was chairman of the House Appropriations Committee, serving in that role during the 109th Congress. In January 2012, he announced that he was not running for re-election and would end his congressional career in January 2013.

== Personal life ==
Lewis was born in Seattle, Washington. In 1952, he graduated from San Bernardino High School in San Bernardino, California, where he captained the swim team. In 1956, he received a Bachelor of Arts degree from UCLA. Lewis served as a Coro Foundation fellow in San Francisco. After college, Lewis was in the insurance business.

Lewis died on July 15, 2021, in Redlands, California, at the age of 86.

== Early political career ==
He was a member of the San Bernardino City Unified School District from 1964 to 1968. He was on the staff of Congressman Jerry Pettis in 1966.

He was a member of the California State Assembly from 1969 to 1978. In January 1974, he ran in a special election for the California State Senate, losing to Democrat Ruben Ayala. In the campaign, Ayala noted that two-thirds of the $130,000 that Lewis raised came from 43 donors — 22 of whom were Sacramento lobbyists.

== U.S. House of Representatives ==
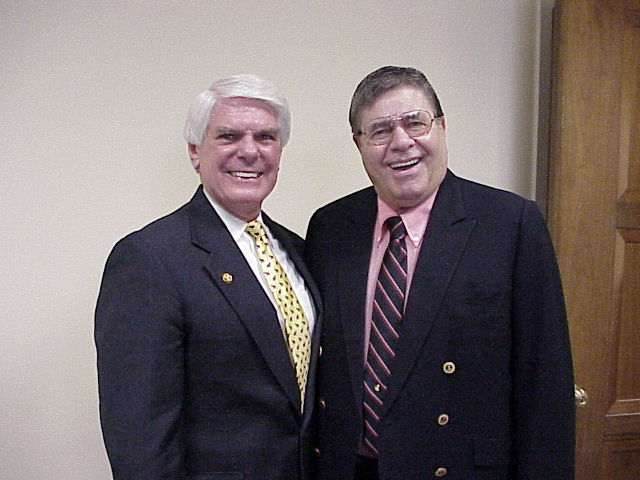
Lewis with comedian Jerry Lewis

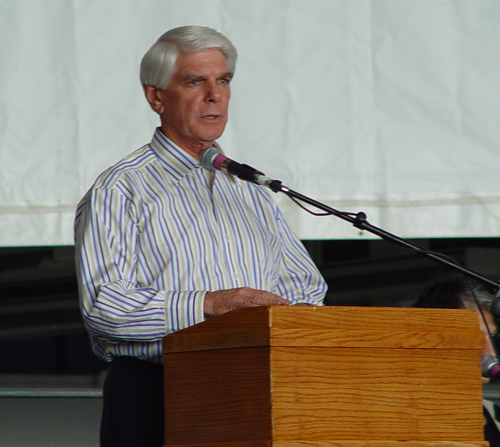
Lewis speaking about wildfire prevention

=== Elections ===
In November 1978, Lewis was elected as a Republican to the 96th United States Congress, in what was then the 37th Congressional district, with 61% of the vote. He was subsequently re-elected 16 times. He never won re-election with less than 61% of the vote. In fact, he only dipped below 65% four times (1990, 1992, 2006, and 2008).

In 2008, Lewis received his strongest challenge in decades from San Bernardino attorney Tim Prince, who won a 4-candidate Democratic primary. Lewis was forced to spend over a million dollars to retain his seat. He declined Prince's challenges for a debate. The incumbent defeated him with 62% of the vote.

On January 12, 2012, Lewis announced his retirement.

=== Tenure ===
Lewis employed his wife, Arlene Willis, as the chief of staff in his office. Before they were married, Willis was her husband's top aide when he came to Capitol Hill in 1979.

In 1994, he was named chairman of the VA-HUD and Independent Agencies Subcommittee, where he worked until 1999 to improve oversight to uncover fraud and abuse in large housing programs and reduce spending on wasteful programs within a number of federal agencies.

He steered federal dollars to the state and to the region for projects such as the planning and construction of the Seven Oaks Dam near Highland, California. Among his proudest achievements came early in his career as a state assemblyman, pushing for the establishment of the first air quality committee in the state Legislature, which led to the formation of the South Coast Air Quality Management District in the mid-1970s.

In 1998, he secured start-up funding for Loma Linda University's Proton Beam treatment center, which has led to the installation of similar cancer treatment centers across the U.S.

Lewis placed special riders in a series of appropriations bills that freed up nearly $100 million to the U.S. Forest Service, the state and the county to remove more than a million trees in the San Bernardino National Forest killed by drought and bark beetle infestation. He worked with U.S. Senator Dianne Feinstein to secure an additional $500 million to reduce the fire danger in the San Bernardino Mountains and throughout Southern California.

Lewis also secured $15 million for a pilot program to refurbish houses repossessed by the Department of Housing and Urban Development and providing them to qualified low income families. The program, according to Lewis' office at the time was successful in Redlands, Highland, and San Bernardino.

=== Political positions ===
Lewis was a member of the Republican Main Street Partnership and supported stem-cell research. Lewis considered himself to be pro-life, opposed most public funding of abortions, but encouraged family planning efforts which are opposed by many Roman Catholics. He voted against banning adoption by same-sex couples in the District of Columbia. He thought gun-control efforts should center on stiff prison terms for repeat criminals who use firearms, but was open to considering requiring trigger locks and other child safety measures for law-abiding gun owners. The American Conservative Union gave Lewis' 2008 voting record 84 out of 100 points. The liberal Americans for Democratic Action gave him 0 out of 100 for 2005 (most recent available). Lewis was a signer of the Taxpayer Protection Pledge.

=== Controversies ===
In its 2009 report, Citizens for Responsibility and Ethics in Washington (CREW) named Lewis one of the 15 most corrupt members of Congress, saying that his "ethics issues stem primarily from the misuse of his position as chairman of the House Appropriations Committee to steer hundreds of millions of dollars in earmarks to family and friends in direct exchange for contributions to his campaign committee and political action committee."

Lewis was also included in the group's report in 2006, 2007, and 2008.

In 2010, the U.S. Department of Justice closed the case without filing charges. It was never submitted to federal prosecutors.

==== Military lobbyist relationships ====
Lewis' aide in charge of tracking defense appropriations, Marine Lt. Col. Carl Kime, was "a military officer on The Pentagon's payroll, an apparent violation of House rules and a possible conflict of interest". U.S. Department of Defense regulations state that military personnel can work on committee staffs but not on the personal staff of an individual member. Kime apparently worked for Lewis since 2001 while being on the Pentagon payroll. Congressional watchdogs call Kime's role a conflict of interest and defense experts state that his position may have given the United States Marine Corps greater leverage over contracts and earmarks on the Appropriations Committee.

On February 22, 2006, The Hill reported that the Pentagon was recalling Kime from Lewis's office. Kime's "service for Lewis appeared to violate the Members' Congressional Handbook issued by the Committee for House Administration, which defines a detailee as a 'non-congressional federal employee assigned to a committee for a period of up to one year.' The handbook also states that 'detailees may not be assigned to a member office' and cites the relevant section of U.S. law: 2 USC Section 72a(f)."

==== Barracks Row earmarks ====
In July 2007, CBS News reported that since 2004, Lewis had earmarked $2.75 million for the "Barracks Row" area of Capitol Hill in Washington, D.C. "Neither I nor my spouse has any financial interest in this project," Lewis said of the improvements being funded by the earmarks. But the congressman's wife, who was also his chief of staff, owns a three-bedroom home valued at $943,000 that is four blocks from the work being paid for by the earmarks. CBS also reported that Tip Tipton, a property owner in the area and a member of the board of directors of the redevelopment project receiving the earmarks, is a top Washington lobbyist who is also a longtime Lewis friend and campaign donor.

==== Loma Linda University ====
From 1998 to 2003, Loma Linda University received $167.2 million in congressional earmarks. That made it the number one academic recipient in the country, with its total nearly $60 million more than the runner up, the University of South Florida. In 2000, Loma Linda University was the single largest recipient of higher education earmarks, at $36 million, largely brought in by Lewis. Several grants were from the U.S. Department of Defense, including $5 million from NASA for space radiation research.

In 2008, Loma Linda University received nearly $9.5 million, of which $5 million came from the Defense Department.

=== Committee assignments ===
Lewis was chair of the House Republican Conference from 1989 to 1992. In January 1995, he became chairman of the Veterans Affairs, Housing and Urban Development and Independent Agencies Appropriations subcommittee. He was the first representative from California to be chairman of the powerful House Appropriations Committee. He also served as chairman of the House Defense Appropriations Subcommittee from 1999 to 2005.

Lewis was the chairman of appropriations committee during the 109th Congress. In the 110th congress and 111th congress, he was the Ranking Member on the committee. He sought the chairmanship for the 112th Congress, but it was instead given to Harold Rogers (R-KY).

- Committee on Appropriations
  - Subcommittee on Defense (Vice Chair)
  - Subcommittee on Energy and Water Development
  - Subcommittee on Interior, Environment, and Related Agencies
  - Subcommittee on Labor, Health and Human Services, Education, and Related Agencies
  - Subcommittee on State, Foreign Operations, and Related Programs

=== Caucus memberships ===
- Congressional Fire Services Caucus
- Congressional Unmanned Systems Caucus
- International Conservation Caucus
- Sportsmens Caucus

== Electoral history ==
California's 37th congressional district: Results 1978–1980
Year	Republican	Votes	Pct	Democratic	Votes	Pct	3rd Party	Party	Votes	Pct
1978	Jerry Lewis	106,581	61%	Dan Corcoran	60,463	35%	Bernard Wahl	American Independent	6,544	4%
1980	Jerry Lewis	165,371	72%	Don Rusk	58,091	25%	Larry Morris	Libertarian	7,615	3%

California's 35th congressional district: Results 1982–1990
Year	Republican	Votes	Pct	Democratic	Votes	Pct	3rd Party	Party	Votes	Pct
1982	Jerry Lewis	112,786	68%	Robert Erwin	52,349	32%				
1984	Jerry Lewis	176,477	85%	No candidate			Kevin Akin	Peace and Freedom	29,990	15%
1986	Jerry Lewis	127,235	77%	Sarge Hall	38,322	23%				
1988	Jerry Lewis	181,203	70%	Paul Sweeney	71,186	28%	Jeff Shuman	Libertarian	4,879	2%
1990	Jerry Lewis	121,602	61%	Barry Norton	66,100	33%	Jerry Johnson	Libertarian	13,020	6%

California's 40th congressional district: Results 1992–2000
Year	Republican	Votes	%	Democratic	Votes	%	Third Party	Party	Votes	%	Third Party	Party	Votes	%
1992	Jerry Lewis	129,563	63%	Don Rusk	63,881	31%	Margie Akin	Peace and Freedom	11,839	6%				
1994	Jerry Lewis	115,728	71%	Don Rusk	48,003	29%								
1996	Jerry Lewis	98,821	65%	Bob Conaway	44,102	29%	Hale McGee	American Independent	4,963	3%	Joseph Kelley	Libertarian	4,375	3%
1998	Jerry Lewis	97,406	65%	Bob Conaway	47,897	32%	Maurice Maybena	Libertarian	4,822	3%				
2000	Jerry Lewis	151,069	80%	No candidate			Frank Schmit	Natural Law	19,029	10%	Marion Lindberg	Libertarian	18,924	10%

California's 41st congressional district: Results 2002–2010
Year	Republican	Votes	%	Democratic	Votes	%	Third Party	Party	Votes	%
2002	Jerry Lewis	91,326	67%	Keith Johnson	40,155	30%	Kevin Craig	Libertarian	4,052	3%
2004	Jerry Lewis	216,682	71%	No candidate			Peymon Mottahedek	Libertarian	37,332	17%
2006	Jerry Lewis	109,761	67%	Louie Contreras	54,235	33%				
2008	Jerry Lewis	159,486	62%	Tim Prince	99,214	38%				
2010	Jerry Lewis	127,857	63%	Pat Meagher	74,394	37%				

U.S. House of Representatives
Preceded by Shirley Neil Pettis	Member of the U.S. House of Representatives from California's 37th congressional district 1979–1983	Succeeded by Al McCandless
Preceded by David Dreier	Member of the U.S. House of Representatives from California's 35th congressional district 1983–1993	Succeeded by Maxine Waters
Preceded by Christopher Cox	Member of the U.S. House of Representatives from California's 40th congressional district 1993–2003	Succeeded by Ed Royce
Preceded by Gary Miller	Member of the U.S. House of Representatives from California's 41st congressional district 2003–2013	Succeeded by Mark Takano
Preceded by Bill Young	Chair of House Appropriations Committee; 2005–2007	Succeeded by Dave Obey
Preceded by Dave Obey	Ranking Member of House Appropriations Committee; 2007–2011	Succeeded by Norm Dicks
Party political offices
Preceded by James G. Martin	Chair of the House Republican Research Committee; 1985–1987	Succeeded by Mickey Edwards
Preceded by Dick Cheney	Chair of the House Republican Policy Committee; 1987–1989	Succeeded by Mickey Edwards
Preceded by Dick Cheney	Chair of the House Republican Conference; 1989–1993	Succeeded by Dick Armey
