= Augustus Hawkins =

American politician (1907–2007)

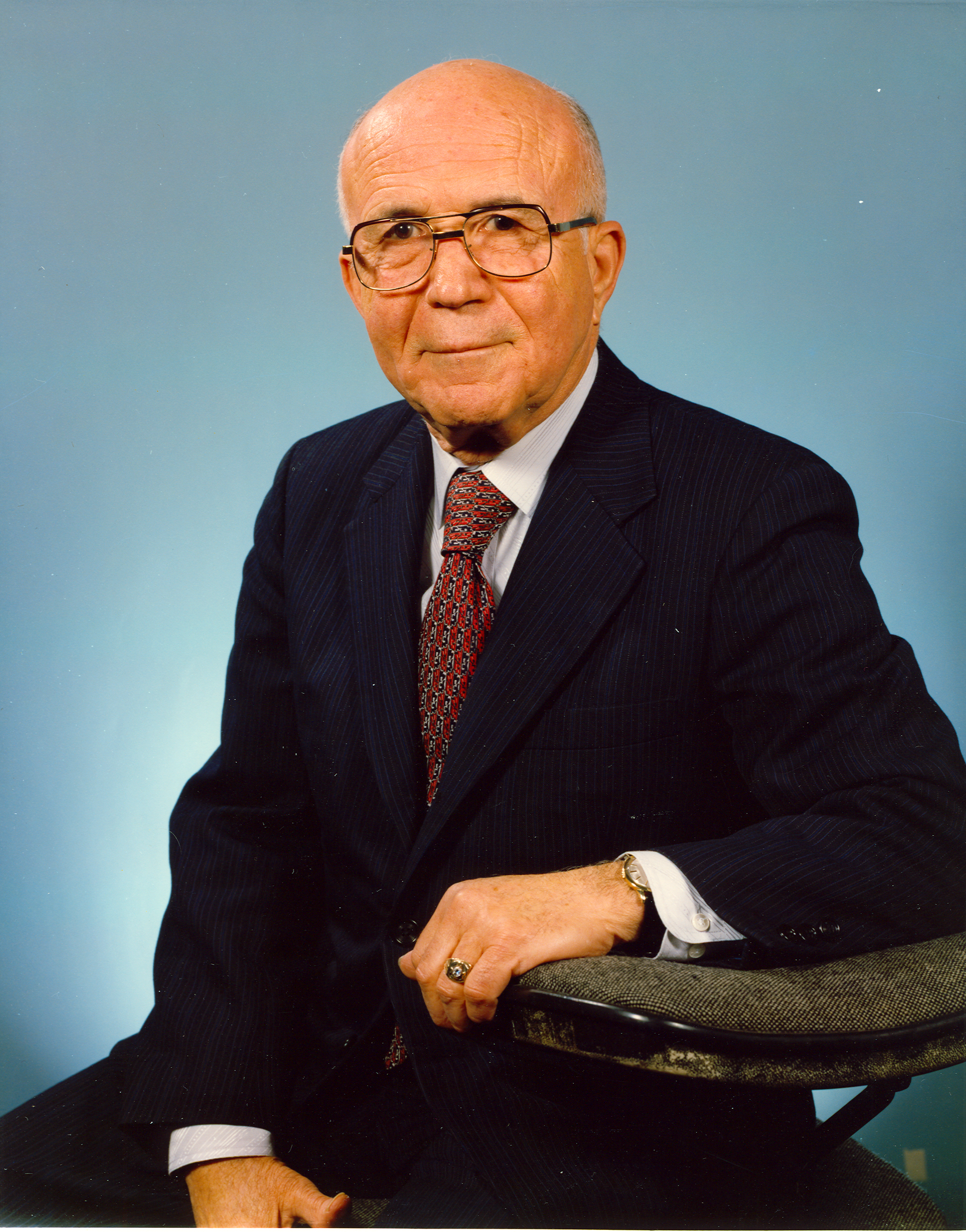

Member of the U.S. House of Representatives from California
- In office January 3, 1963 – January 3, 1991
- Preceded by: New district (redistricting)
- Succeeded by: Maxine Waters
- Constituency: 21st district (1963–1975); 29th district (1975–1991)

Member of the California State Assembly from the 62nd district
- In office January 7, 1935 – January 3, 1963
- Preceded by: Frederick Madison Roberts
- Succeeded by: Tom Waite

Personal details
- Born: Augustus Freeman Hawkins; August 31, 1907 Shreveport, Louisiana, U.S.
- Died: November 10, 2007 (aged 100) Bethesda, Maryland, U.S.
- Party: Democratic
- Spouse(s): Pegga Smith (1945–1966); Elsie Hawkins (1977–2007)
- Education: University of California, Los Angeles (BA)
- Augustus Hawkins's voice Hawkins introduces a comprehensive economic bill of rights Recorded July 1, 1987

Augustus Freeman Hawkins (August 31, 1907 – November 10, 2007) was an American politician of the Democratic Party who served in the California State Assembly from 1935 to 1963 and the U.S. House of Representatives from 1963 to 1991. Over the course of his career, Hawkins authored more than 300 state and federal laws, the most famous of which are Title VII of the Civil Rights Act of 1964 and the 1978 Humphrey-Hawkins Full Employment Act. He was known as the "silent warrior" for his commitment to education and ending unemployment.

== Early and personal life ==
Hawkins was born in Shreveport, Louisiana, the youngest of five children, to Nyanza Hawkins and Hattie Freeman. In 1918, the family moved to Los Angeles. Hawkins graduated from Jefferson High School in 1926, and received a bachelor's degree in economics from the University of California, Los Angeles in 1931. After graduation, he planned to study civil engineering, but the financial constraints of the Great Depression made this impossible. This contributed towards his interest in politics, and his lifelong devotion to education. After graduating, Hawkins operated a real-estate company with his brother and studied government. While serving in the California State Assembly, Hawkins married Pegga Adeline Smith on August 28, 1945. Smith died in 1966, and Hawkins later married Elsie Taylor in 1977. After retiring from Congress, he stayed in the Washington area because his wife preferred it, living there until his death, which came two months after hers.

An African American of mixed-race ancestry, Hawkins was very light-skinned and reportedly resembled his English grandfather. Throughout his life, he was often assumed to be of solely white ancestry, although he refused to pass as white.

== Political career ==
=== State Assembly ===
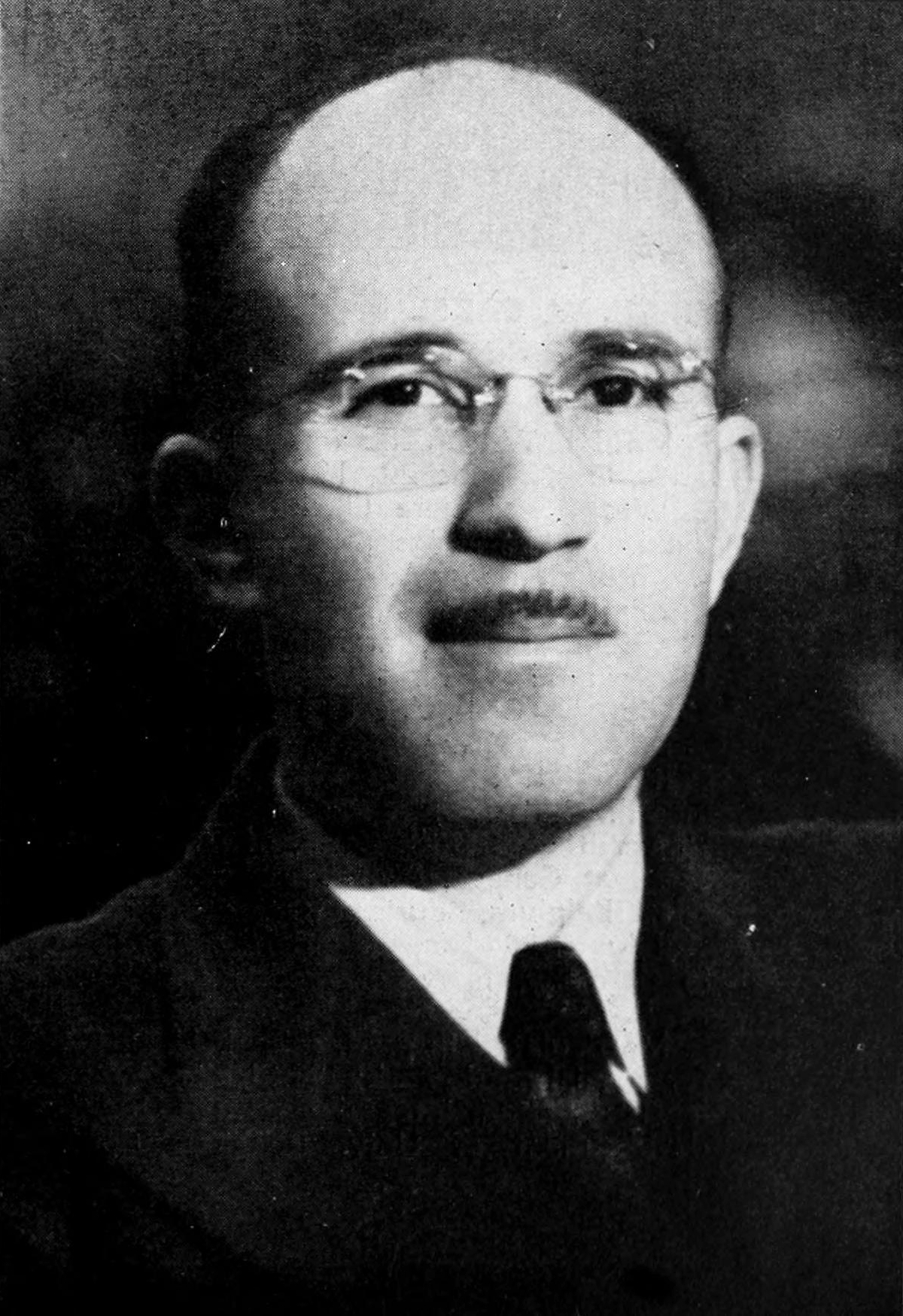
Hawkins c. 1940

Hawkins was part of a more general shift by African Americans away from the Republican and towards the Democratic Party. Unlike the majority of African Americans, he supported Franklin D. Roosevelt's campaign for president in 1932. Hawkins favored measures such as the New Deal, which was wildly popular in the United States at large and the African-American community in particular. Roosevelt would go on to be the first Democratic president to win the black vote, in 1936. In the 1934 California gubernatorial election, Hawkins supported the controversial candidacy of Upton Sinclair, a Socialist-turned-Democrat. Although Sinclair lost, Hawkins defeated 16-year incumbent Republican Frederick Madison Roberts, the great-grandson of Sally Hemings and President Thomas Jefferson and the first African American in the California State Assembly. Hawkins would serve as a Democratic member of the Assembly from 1935 until 1963; by the time of his departure, Hawkins was the Assembly's most senior member, as Roberts was before him.

Black representation was so limited that "the black strategy for gaining political power was to exercise influence within the Democratic Party through voting for, and lobbying, white politicians." Aside from Hawkins, "Los Angeles blacks had no other political representative in city, county, state, or federal government."

Hawkins's district was a mixture of Latinos, African Americans, and working-class white migrants from the South and Midwest. During his time in the Assembly, he introduced legislation including "a fair housing act, a fair employment practices act, low-cost housing and disability insurance legislation, and workers' compensation provisions for domestic workers." Along with education, fair practices in employment and housing became Hawkins's major causes. He received little support at the time for these measures from the Democratic Party, however. Nevertheless, he was able to get some measures passed, including his fair-housing law, which prohibited discrimination by any builders that received federal funds.

Hawkins was a delegate to the Democratic National Conventions of 1940, 1944 and 1960, as well as an presidential elector from California in 1944. In 1958, Hawkins sought to be Speaker of the California State Assembly, which was the second-most powerful position in the state, after the Governor of California. Hawkins lost to Ralph M. Brown, but was made chairman of the powerful Rules Committee. Had Hawkins succeeded, he would have become the first African-American Speaker in California history, a feat that Willie Brown would achieve in 1980. In 1962, Hawkins won a newly created majority-black congressional district encompassing central Los Angeles With an endorsement from John F. Kennedy, Hawkins easily won the primary and the general election. After the election, Hawkins remarked, "It's like shifting gears—from the oldest man in the Assembly in years of service to a freshman in Congress."

=== U.S. Congress ===
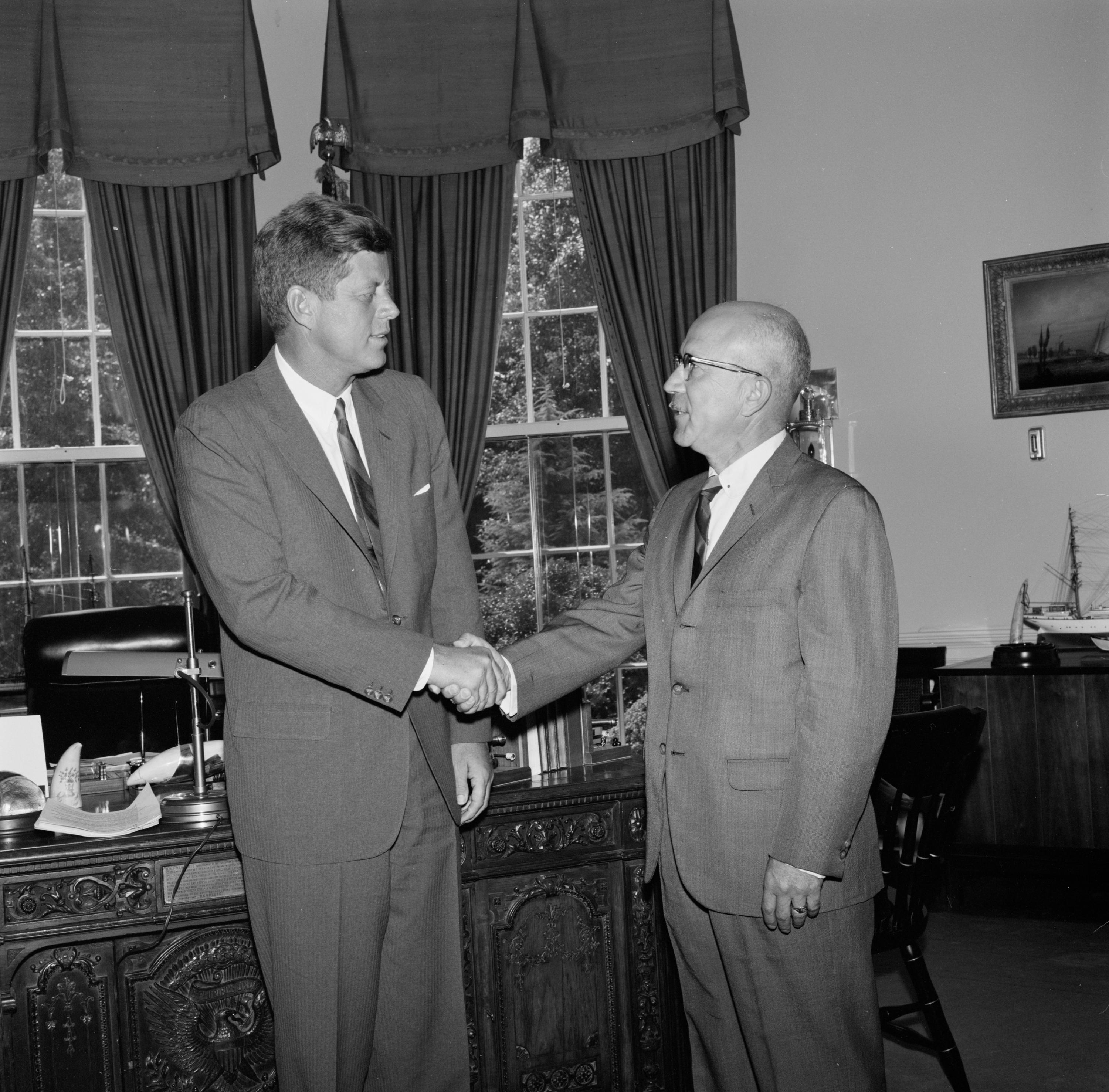
Hawkins with President John F. Kennedy in 1962

From 1963 to 1991, Hawkins represented California's 21st District (1963–1975), and the 29th District (1975–1991), covering southern Los Angeles County, in Congress. Hawkins was consistently elected with over 80% of the vote in his Democratic-friendly district. He was the first black representative to be elected from west of the Mississippi River.

Hawkins was a strong supporter of President Lyndon B. Johnson's Great Society. Early in his congressional career, he authored legislation including Title VII of the Civil Rights Act of 1964 that established the Equal Employment Opportunity Commission. Hawkins was a strong supporter of civil rights, and he toured the South in 1964 to advocate for African-American voter registration.

Five days after the Voting Rights Act of 1965 was signed into law, the Watts Riots occurred in Hawkins's district. It was the first of many race riots in the 1960s. Hawkins urged his colleagues in Congress to increase antipoverty funds, but he did not condone the violence. Due to his light skin and heightened racial tensions, Hawkins had to be careful when he visited his district shortly after the riots. The riots stalled the Great Society, particularly over the fair housing; blacks who benefited from Great Society laws were blamed as being harmful to the "law and order" of America, particularly if they were allowed to live next to whites. Fair housing was still an unpopular issue in America: Democratic Senate nominee Pierre Salinger lost to Republican George Murphy in California over the issue, marking the only Republican pickup amid Lyndon Johnson's crushing presidential victory over anti-Civil Rights Act Barry Goldwater in 1964. Open housing reform seemed next on the Great Society list after the Voting Rights Act was signed, but the Watts Riot put it on hold. It was not passed until after the 1968 assassination of Martin Luther King Jr.

On the Vietnam War, Hawkins initially agreed with President Johnson. In 1964, both insisted that the war undermined the Great Society and that the United States could not "impose our way of life on other people." When it became clear that South Vietnam was not stable enough to survive without American backing, Hawkins increased his criticism of the war. After touring South Vietnam June 1970, Hawkins and fellow Democratic Representative William Anderson drafted a House Resolution urging Congress to "condemn the cruel and inhumane treatment" of prisoners in South Vietnam. Anderson and Hawkins had visited South Vietnam with nine other congressmen, but they were the only two to visit a civilian South Vietnamese prison on Con Son Island, which they described as being akin to "tiger cages." The two Representatives also pressured President Nixon to send an independent task force to investigate the prison and "prevent further degradation and death."

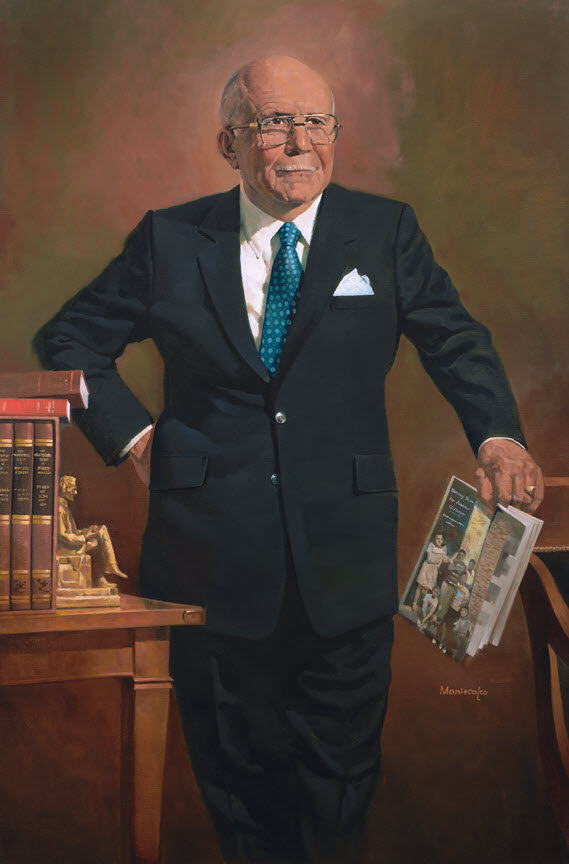
Portrait of Hawkins in the Collection of the U.S. House of Representatives

Hawkins was a founding member of the Congressional Black Caucus, and served as vice chairman during its first term (1971–1973). Hawkins did not play a significant role in the CBC, as he preferred to focus on legislation rather than use Congress as a bully pulpit like other African Americans such as Adam Clayton Powell Jr., Bill Clay, and Ron Dellums; Hawkins argued that there needed to be "clearer thinking and fewer exhibitionists in the civil rights movement." During this time, Hawkins succeeded in restoring honorable discharges to the 170 black soldiers of the 25th Infantry Regiment who had been falsely accused of a public disturbance in Brownsville, Texas, in 1906, and removed from the Army. Unlike other CBC members, he sought cooperation from organized labor and white ethnics in order to make his agenda more likely to pass into law. In 1980, Hawkins criticized the CBC as "85 percent social and 15 percent business."

Aside from Title VII of the Civil Rights Act, laws that Hawkins was instrumental in passing include: the 1974 Juvenile Justice and Delinquency Prevention Act, a law that provided certain protections to young criminal offenders; the 1978 Comprehensive Employment and Training Act; and the 1978 Pregnancy Disability Act, which aimed to prevent discrimination against women on the basis of pregnancy and of which Hawkins said, "we have the opportunity to ensure that genuine equality in the American labor force is more than an illusion and that pregnancy will no longer be the basis of unfavorable treatment of working women." Hawkins is known best of all for the 1978 Humphrey-Hawkins Full Employment Act, which Hawkins sponsored in 1977 alongside Senator Hubert Humphrey of Minnesota. The bill gave the U.S. government the goal of providing full employment; it also ordered that the Chairman of the Federal Reserve Board must provide Congress with testimony on the state of the economy. However, by the time that the bill made it to President Jimmy Carter's desk, "the legislation was clearly symbolic." Hawkins later authored landmark legislation such as the Job Training Partnership Act and the 1988 School Improvement Act. He became chair of the House Education and Labor Committee in 1984.

Hawkins was frustrated from the relative lack of success that he achieved during the 1980s' presidencies of Ronald Reagan and George H. W. Bush. They were the most conservative presidents since the 1920s, and members of his own party were moving to the right and viewed Hawkins's old-school New Dealer stance as outdated. His greatest setback was George H. W. Bush's veto of the Civil Rights Act of 1990, sometimes called the Hawkins-Kennedy Civil Rights Act. It would have reversed six Supreme Court decisions made in the previous year that had shifted the burden of proof of discriminating hiring practices of minorities or women from the employer to the employee. It remains the only successful veto of a civil rights act in United States history. Hawkins retired in January 1991. Bush would sign a less expansive bill, the Civil Rights Act of 1991, after Hawkins's retirement.

== Later life ==
Hawkins retired from Congress in 1991, having never lost an election in his 56-year career as an elected official. He died at Suburban Hospital in Bethesda, Maryland, on November 10, 2007; aged 100, he was the oldest living person to have served in Congress at the time of his death, and the eighth member of Congress to have become a centenarian. Hawkins's death left the former Alabama Republican Representative Arthur Glenn Andrews (1909–2008) as the oldest living former House member.

== Legacy ==
The Augustus F. Hawkins Nature Park was built in 2000 in a highly urbanized area of southern Los Angeles. The cost was $4.5 million and was financed largely by city, county, and state bond measures. The park encompasses 8.5 acres and features the Evan Frankel Discovery Center, which includes natural history and environmental interpretive displays. The Augustus F. Hawkins Centers of Excellence Program is a federal grants program supporting diversification of the U.S. teaching force.

Augustus F. Hawkins High School in Los Angeles, which opened in 2012, is named in his honor.

== Electoral history ==
Augustus Hawkins electoral history

1962 United States House of Representatives elections in California, 21st district
Party	Candidate	Votes	%
Democratic	Augustus F. Hawkins	73,465	84.6
Republican	Herman Smith	13,371	15.2
Total votes		86,836	100.0
Turnout			
Democratic win (new seat)			

1964 United States House of Representatives elections in California, 21st district
Party	Candidate	Votes	%
Democratic	Augustus F. Hawkins (Incumbent)	106,231	90.3
Republican	Rayfield Lundy	11,374	9.7
Total votes		117,605	100.0
Turnout			
Democratic hold			

1966 United States House of Representatives elections in California, 21st district
Party	Candidate	Votes	%
Democratic	Augustus F. Hawkins (Incumbent)	74,216	84.8
Republican	Rayfield Lundy	13,294	15.2
Total votes		87,510	100.0
Turnout			
Democratic hold			

1968 United States House of Representatives elections in California, 21st district
Party	Candidate	Votes	%
Democratic	Augustus F. Hawkins (Incumbent)	87,205	91.6
Republican	Rayfield Lundy	7,995	8.4
Total votes		95,200	100.0
Turnout			
Democratic hold			

1970 United States House of Representatives elections in California, 21st district
Party	Candidate	Votes	%
Democratic	Augustus F. Hawkins (Incumbent)	75,127	94.5
Republican	Southy M. Johnson	4,349	5.5
Total votes		79,476	100.0
Turnout			
Democratic hold			

1972 United States House of Representatives elections in California, 21st district
Party	Candidate	Votes	%
Democratic	Augustus F. Hawkins (Incumbent)	92,799	82.9
Republican	Rayfield Lundy	19,187	17.1
Total votes		111,986	100.0
Turnout			
Democratic hold			

1974 United States House of Representatives elections in California
Party	Candidate	Votes	%
Democratic	Augustus F. Hawkins (Incumbent)	45,977	100.0
Democratic hold			

1976 United States House of Representatives elections in California
Party	Candidate	Votes	%
Democratic	Augustus F. Hawkins (Incumbent)	82,515	85.5
Republican	Michael D. Germonprez	10,852	11.2
Independent	Sheila Leburg	3,235	3.3
Total votes		96,602	100.0
Democratic hold			

1978 United States House of Representatives elections in California
Party	Candidate	Votes	%
Democratic	Augustus F. Hawkins (Incumbent)	65,214	85.0
Republican	Uriah J. Fields	11,512	15.0
Total votes		76,726	100.0
Democratic hold			

1980 United States House of Representatives elections in California
Party	Candidate	Votes	%
Democratic	Augustus F. Hawkins (Incumbent)	80,095	86.1
Republican	Michael Arthur Hirt	10,282	11.1
Libertarian	Earl Smith	2,622	2.8
Total votes		92,999	100.0
Democratic hold			

1982 United States House of Representatives elections in California
Party	Candidate	Votes	%
Democratic	Augustus F. Hawkins (Incumbent)	97,028	79.8
Republican	Milton R. Mackaig	24,568	20.2
Total votes		121,596	100.0
Democratic hold			

1984 United States House of Representatives elections in California
Party	Candidate	Votes	%
Democratic	Augustus F. Hawkins (Incumbent)	108,777	86.6
Republican	Echo Y. Goto	16,781	13.4
Total votes		125,558	100.0
Democratic hold			

1986 United States House of Representatives elections in California
Party	Candidate	Votes	%
Democratic	Augustus F. Hawkins (Incumbent)	78,132	84.6
Republican	John Van de Brooke	13,432	14.5
Libertarian	Waheed R. Boctor	851	0.9
Total votes		92,415	100.0
Democratic hold			

1988 United States House of Representatives elections in California
Party	Candidate	Votes	%
Democratic	Augustus F. Hawkins (Incumbent)	88,169	82.8
Republican	Reuben D. Franco	14,543	13.7
Libertarian	Gregory P. Gilmore	3,724	3.5
Total votes		105,436	100.0
Democratic hold			

== See also ==
- List of African-American United States representatives

California Assembly
Preceded by Frederick Madison Roberts	Member of the California Assembly from the 62nd district 1935–1963	Succeeded by Tom Waite
U.S. House of Representatives
Preceded by Edgar W. Hiestand	Member of the U.S. House of Representatives from California's 21st congressional district 1963–1975	Succeeded by James C. Corman
Preceded by George E. Danielson	Member of the U.S. House of Representatives from California's 29th congressional district 1975–1991	Succeeded by Maxine Waters
Preceded by Lucien Nedzi	Chair of House Administration Committee; 1981–1984	Succeeded by Frank Annunzio
Preceded by Carl D. Perkins	Chair of House Education Committee; 1984–1991	Succeeded by William D. Ford
Honorary titles
Preceded by Claude Pepper	Oldest member of the U.S. House of Representatives; 1989–1991	Succeeded by Sidney R. Yates
Preceded by John G. Dow	Oldest living United States representative (Sitting or former); 2003–2007	Succeeded by Glenn Andrews
