= Andrews Academy =

Location
- 8833 Garland Ave. Berrien Springs, Michigan 49104-0560; United States; 41°57′31″N 86°21′11″W

Information
- School type: High school
- Motto: He restores my soul
- Founded: 1922
- Principal: Ruben Perez Schulz
- Grades: 9–12
- Enrollment: 243 (2024)
- Colors: Red/Black/White
- Mascot: Cardinal
- Team name: Junior Cardinals
- Affiliation: Seventh-day Adventist Church
- Website: www.andrews.edu/aa

Andrews Academy is a Seventh-day Adventist secondary school (grades 9–12) located in Berrien Springs, Michigan. Andrews Academy's sister school, Ruth Murdoch Elementary School, handles students in grades K-8. Collectively, these two schools are known as the University Schools.

== History ==
Andrews Academy was established in 1922, when Emmanuel Missionary College (EMC), later renamed Andrews University, organized the institution with dedicated faculty. Before 1922, EMC included the elementary and high school grades as part of its institution's course offerings. The academy currently occupies a 78,000-square-foot (7,200 m^{2}) building adjacent to the campus of Andrews University.

== Athletics ==
The Academy offers the following sports:

- Basketball (boys & girls)
- Volleyball (girls)
- Soccer (coed)

== Accreditation ==
Andrews Academy is accredited by the Accrediting Association of Seventh-day Adventist Schools, Colleges and Universities and the North Central Association on Accreditation and School Improvement.

== Notable alumni ==
- Shirley Neil Pettis – California politician

== See also ==
- Seventh-day Adventist education
- List of Seventh-day Adventist secondary schools
- Andrews University
