= Kenneth W. Dyal =

American politician (1910–1978)

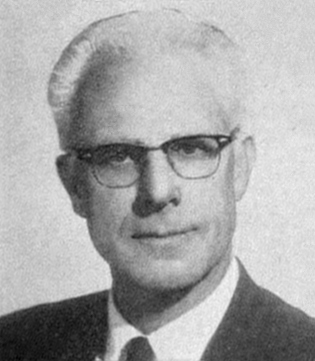

Member of the U.S. House of Representatives from California's 33rd district
- In office January 3, 1965 – January 3, 1967
- Preceded by: Harry R. Sheppard
- Succeeded by: Jerry Pettis

Personal details
- Born: July 9, 1910 Bisbee, Arizona
- Died: May 12, 1978 (aged 67) Oakland, California
- Resting place: Montecito Cemetery; Colton, California
- Party: Democratic Party

Kenneth Warren Dyal (July 9, 1910 – May 12, 1978) was an American politician who served one term as a U.S. representative from California from 1965 to 1967.

== Biography ==
Born in Bisbee, Arizona, Dyal attended the public schools of San Bernardino and Colton, California. He moved to San Bernardino, California, in 1917.

=== Early career ===
Dyal was secretary to the San Bernardino County Board of Supervisors from 1941 to 1943. He served as a lieutenant commander in the United States Naval Reserve from 1943 to 1946.

From 1947 to 1954 he served as postmaster of San Bernardino. He was an insurance company executive from 1954 to 1961, and was a member of the board of directors of Los Angeles Airways, Inc. from 1956 to 1964.

=== Congress ===
Dyal was elected as a Democrat to the Eighty-ninth Congress (January 3, 1965 – January 3, 1967). He was an unsuccessful candidate for reelection in 1966 to the Ninetieth Congress.

=== Later career and death ===
After leaving Congress, he served as a regional director for the San Francisco, California, Post Office Department from 1966 to 1969. He later became a Regional Programs Coordinator at the United States Post Office from 1969 to 1971.

In his later years, he resided in Oakland, California, until his death there May 12, 1978. He was interred in Montecito Cemetery, Colton, California.

== Electoral history ==
1964 United States House of Representatives elections in California
Party	Candidate	Votes	%
Democratic	Kenneth W. Dyal	109,047	51.7
Republican	Jerry Pettis	101,742	48.3
Total votes		210,789	100.0
Democratic hold			

1966 United States House of Representatives elections in California
Party	Candidate	Votes	%
Republican	Jerry Pettis	102,401	53.5
Democratic	Kenneth W. Dyal (incumbent)	89,071	46.5
Total votes		191,472	100.0
Republican gain from Democratic			

U.S. House of Representatives
Preceded by Harry R. Sheppard	Member of the U.S. House of Representatives from California's 33rd congressional district 1965–1967	Succeeded by Jerry Pettis
