= 1970 United States House of Representatives elections in California =

- November 3, 1970

All 38 California seats to the United States House of Representatives
	Majority party	Minority party
Party	Democratic	Republican
Last election	21	17
Seats won	20	18
Seat change	▼1	▲1
Popular vote	3,124,147	3,093,405
Percentage	49.44%	48.95%
- Results: Democratic hold Republican hold Republican gain

The United States House of Representatives elections in California, 1970 was an election for California's delegation to the United States House of Representatives, which occurred as part of the general election of the House of Representatives on November 3, 1970. Republicans won one open seat when John V. Tunney retired to run for Senate.

== Overview ==
United States House of Representatives elections in California, 1970
Party	Votes	%	Before	After	+/–
Democratic	3,124,147	49.44%	21	20	-1
Republican	3,093,405	48.95%	17	18	+1
American Independent	60,620	0.96%	0	0	0
Peace and Freedom	38,436	0.61%	0	0	0
Scattering	2,786	0.04%	0	0	0
Totals	6,319,394	100.00%	38	38	—

== Results ==
Final results from the Clerk of the House of Representatives:

=== District 1 ===
California's 1st congressional district election, 1970
Party	Candidate	Votes	%
Republican	Don H. Clausen (incumbent)	108,358	63.35
Democratic	William Kortum	62,688	36.65
Total votes		171,046	100.00
Turnout			
Republican hold			

=== District 2 ===
California's 2nd congressional district election, 1970
Party	Candidate	Votes	%
Democratic	Harold T. Johnson (incumbent)	151,070	77.88
Republican	Lloyd E. Gilbert	37,223	19.19
American Independent	Jack R. Carrigg	5,681	2.93
Total votes		193,974	100.00
Turnout			
Democratic hold			

=== District 3 ===
California's 3rd congressional district election, 1970
Party	Candidate	Votes	%
Democratic	John E. Moss (incumbent)	117,496	61.56
Republican	Elmore J. Duffy	69,811	36.58
American Independent	Allen E. Priest	3,554	1.86
Total votes		190,861	100.00
Turnout			
Democratic hold			

=== District 4 ===
California's 4th congressional district election, 1970
Party	Candidate	Votes	%
Democratic	Robert L. Leggett (incumbent)	103,485	67.96
Republican	Andrew Gyorke	48,783	32.04
Total votes		152,268	100.00
Turnout			
Democratic hold			

=== District 5 ===
California's 5th congressional district election, 1970
Party	Candidate	Votes	%
Democratic	Phillip Burton (incumbent)	76,567	70.81
Republican	John E. Parks	31,570	29.19
Total votes		108,137	100.00
Turnout			
Democratic hold			

=== District 6 ===
California's 6th congressional district election, 1970
Party	Candidate	Votes	%
Republican	William S. Mailliard (incumbent)	96,393	53.36
Democratic	Russell R. Miller	84,255	46.64
Total votes		180,648	100.00
Turnout			
Democratic hold			

=== District 7 ===
California's 7th congressional district election, 1970
Party	Candidate	Votes	%
Democratic	Ron Dellums	89,784	57.32
Republican	John E. Healy	64,691	41.30
Peace and Freedom	Sarah Scahill	2,156	1.38
Total votes		156,631	100.00
Turnout			
Democratic hold			

=== District 8 ===
California's 8th congressional district election, 1970
Party	Candidate	Votes	%
Democratic	George P. Miller (incumbent)	104,311	69.00
Republican	Michael A. Crane	46,872	31.00
Total votes		151,183	100.00
Turnout			
Democratic hold			

=== District 9 ===
California's 9th congressional district election, 1970
Party	Candidate	Votes	%
Democratic	Don Edwards (incumbent)	120,041	69.15
Republican	Mark Guerra	49,556	28.55
American Independent	Edmon V. Kaiser	4,009	2.31
Total votes		173,606	100.00
Turnout			
Democratic hold			

=== District 10 ===
California's 10th congressional district election, 1970
Party	Candidate	Votes	%
Republican	Charles S. Gubser (incumbent)	135,864	62.03
Democratic	Stuart. D. McLean	80,530	36.76
American Independent	Joyce W. Stancliffe	2,651	1.21
Total votes		219,045	100.00
Turnout			
Republican hold			

=== District 11 ===
California's 11th congressional district election, 1970
Party	Candidate	Votes	%
Republican	Pete McCloskey (incumbent)	144,500	77.49
Democratic	Robert E. Gomperts	39,188	21.02
No party	Scattering	2,786	1.49
Total votes		186,474	100.00
Turnout			
Republican hold			

=== District 12 ===
California's 12th congressional district election, 1970
Party	Candidate	Votes	%
Republican	Burt L. Talcott (incumbent)	95,549	63.63
Democratic	O'Brien Riordan	50,942	33.92
Peace and Freedom	Herbert H. Foster, Jr.	3,682	2.45
Total votes		150,173	100.00
Turnout			
Republican hold			

=== District 13 ===
California's 13th congressional district election, 1970
Party	Candidate	Votes	%
Republican	Charles M. Teague (incumbent)	125,507	58.15
Democratic	Gary K. Hart	87,980	40.76
American Independent	Maude I. Jordet	2,339	1.08
Total votes		215,826	100.00
Turnout			
Republican hold			

=== District 14 ===
California's 14th congressional district election, 1970
Party	Candidate	Votes	%
Democratic	Jerome Waldie (incumbent)	148,655	74.55
Republican	Byron D. Athan	50,750	25.45
Total votes		199,405	100.00
Turnout			
Democratic hold			

=== District 15 ===
California's 15th congressional district election, 1970
Party	Candidate	Votes	%
Democratic	John J. McFall (incumbent)	98,442	63.11
Republican	Sam Van Dyken	55,546	35.61
American Independent	Francis E. "Gill" Gillings	1,994	1.28
Total votes		155,982	100.00
Turnout			
Democratic hold			

=== District 16 ===
California's 16th congressional district election, 1970
Party	Candidate	Votes	%
Democratic	Bernice F. Sisk (incumbent)	95,118	66.42
Republican	Phillip V. Sanchez	43,843	30.62
American Independent	James W. Scott	4,237	2.96
Total votes		143,198	100.00
Turnout			
Democratic hold			

=== District 17 ===
California's 17th congressional district election, 1970
Party	Candidate	Votes	%
Democratic	Glenn M. Anderson (incumbent)	83,739	62.24
Republican	Vernon E. Brown	47,778	35.51
American Independent	Robert W. Copeland	1,724	1.28
Peace and Freedom	Thomas E. Mathews	1,292	0.96
Total votes		134,533	100.00
Turnout			
Democratic hold			

=== District 18 ===
California's 18th congressional district election, 1970
Party	Candidate	Votes	%
Republican	Bob Mathias (incumbent)	86,071	63.20
Democratic	Milton Spartacus Miller	48,415	35.55
American Independent	Nora E. Hensley	1,709	1.25
Total votes		136,195	100.00
Turnout			
Republican hold			

=== District 19 ===
California's 19th congressional district election, 1970
Party	Candidate	Votes	%
Democratic	Chet Holifield (incumbent)	98,578	70.39
Republican	Bill Jones	41,462	29.61
Total votes		140,040	100.00
Turnout			
Democratic hold			

=== District 20 ===
California's 20th congressional district election, 1970
Party	Candidate	Votes	%
Republican	H. Allen Smith (incumbent)	116,437	69.07
Democratic	Michael M. Stolzberg	50,033	29.68
American Independent	Earl C. Harper	2,100	1.25
Total votes		168,570	100.00
Turnout			
Republican hold			

=== District 21 ===
California's 21st congressional district election, 1970
Party	Candidate	Votes	%
Democratic	Augustus F. Hawkins (incumbent)	75,127	94.53
Republican	Southy M. Johnson	4,349	5.47
Total votes		79,476	100.00
Turnout			
Democratic hold			

=== District 22 ===
California's 22nd congressional district election, 1970
Party	Candidate	Votes	%
Democratic	James C. Corman (incumbent)	95,256	59.37
Republican	Tom Hayden	63,297	39.45
American Independent	Callis R. Johnson	1,880	1.17
Total votes		160,433	100.00
Turnout			
Democratic hold			

=== District 23 ===
California's 23rd congressional district election, 1970
Party	Candidate	Votes	%
Republican	Del M. Clawson (incumbent)	77,346	63.34
Democratic	G. L. "Jerry" Chapman	44,767	36.66
Total votes		122,113	100.00
Turnout			
Republican hold			

=== District 24 ===
California's 24th congressional district election, 1970
Party	Candidate	Votes	%
Republican	John H. Rousselot (incumbent)	124,071	65.05
Democratic	Myrlie B. Evers	61,777	32.39
American Independent	Brian Scanlon	3,018	1.58
Peace and Freedom	Harold Kaplan	1,858	0.97
Total votes		190,724	100.00
Turnout			
Republican hold			

=== District 25 ===
California's 25th congressional district election, 1970
Party	Candidate	Votes	%
Republican	Charles E. Wiggins (incumbent)	116,169	63.29
Democratic	Leslie W. "Les" Craven	64,386	35.08
American Independent	Kevin Scanlon	2,994	1.63
Total votes		183,549	100.00
Turnout			
Republican hold			

=== District 26 ===
California's 26th congressional district election, 1970
Party	Candidate	Votes	%
Democratic	Thomas M. Rees (incumbent)	130,499	71.28
Republican	Nathaniel Jay Friedman	47,260	25.81
Peace and Freedom	Lewis B. McCammon	3,677	2.01
American Independent	Howard E. Hallinan	1,639	0.90
Total votes		183,075	100.00
Turnout			
Democratic hold			

=== District 27 ===
California's 27th congressional district election, 1970
Party	Candidate	Votes	%
Republican	Barry Goldwater, Jr.	139,326	66.69
Democratic	N. "Toni" Kimmel	63,652	30.47
Peace and Freedom	Edward Richer	3,306	1.58
American Independent	John H. Hind	2,642	1.26
Total votes		208,926	100.00
Turnout			
Republican hold			

=== District 28 ===
California's 28th congressional district election, 1970
Party	Candidate	Votes	%
Republican	Alphonzo E. Bell, Jr. (incumbent)	154,691	69.27
Democratic	Don McLaughlin	57,882	25.92
American Independent	Derek A. Gordon	5,759	2.58
Peace and Freedom	Jane E. Gordon	4,971	2.23
Total votes		223,303	100.00
Turnout			
Republican hold			

=== District 29 ===
California's 29th congressional district election, 1970
Party	Candidate	Votes	%
Democratic	George E. Danielson	71,308	62.59
Republican	Tom McMann	42,620	37.41
Total votes		113,928	100.00
Turnout			
Democratic hold			

=== District 30 ===
California's 30th congressional district election, 1970
Party	Candidate	Votes	%
Democratic	Edward R. Roybal (incumbent)	63,903	68.26
Republican	Samuel F. Cavnar	28,038	29.95
American Independent	Boris Belousov	1,681	1.80
Total votes		93,622	100.00
Turnout			
Democratic hold			

=== District 31 ===
California's 31st congressional district election, 1970
Party	Candidate	Votes	%
Democratic	Charles H. Wilson (incumbent)	102,071	73.18
Republican	Fred L. Casmir	37,416	26.82
Total votes		139,487	100.00
Turnout			
Democratic hold			

=== District 32 ===
California's 32nd congressional district election, 1970
Party	Candidate	Votes	%
Republican	Craig Hosmer (incumbent)	119,340	71.53
Democratic	Walter L. Mallonee	44,278	26.54
Peace and Freedom	John S. Donohue	3,227	1.93
Total votes		166,845	100.00
Turnout			
Republican hold			

=== District 33 ===
California's 33rd congressional district election, 1970
Party	Candidate	Votes	%
Republican	Jerry Pettis (incumbent)	116,093	72.17
Democratic	Chester M. Wright	44,764	27.83
Total votes		160,857	100.00
Turnout			
Republican hold			

=== District 34 ===
California's 34th congressional district election, 1970
Party	Candidate	Votes	%
Democratic	Richard T. Hanna (incumbent)	101,664	54.46
Republican	Bill J. Teague	82,167	44.02
American Independent	Lee R. Rayburn	2,843	1.52
Total votes		186,674	100.00
Turnout			
Democratic hold			

=== District 35 ===
California's 35th congressional district election, 1970
Party	Candidate	Votes	%
Republican	John G. Schmitz (incumbent)	192,765	67.04
Democratic	Thomas B. Lenhart	87,019	30.26
Peace and Freedom	Francis R. Halpern	7,742	2.69
Total votes		287,526	100.00
Turnout			
Republican hold			

=== District 36 ===
California's 36th congressional district election, 1970
Party	Candidate	Votes	%
Republican	Bob Wilson (incumbent)	132,446	71.53
Democratic	Daniel K. Hostetter	44,841	24.22
Peace and Freedom	Walter H. Koppelman	5,139	2.78
American Independent	Orville J. Davis	2,723	1.47
Total votes		185,149	100.00
Turnout			
Republican hold			

=== District 37 ===
California's 37th congressional district election, 1970
Party	Candidate	Votes	%
Democratic	Lionel Van Deerlin (incumbent)	93,952	72.12
Republican	James B. Kuhn	31,968	24.54
American Independent	Faye B. Brice	2,962	2.27
Peace and Freedom	Fritjof Thygeson	1,386	1.06
Total votes		130,268	100.00
Turnout			
Democratic hold			

=== District 38 ===
California's 38th congressional district election, 1970
Party	Candidate	Votes	%
Republican	Victor Veysey	87,479	49.80
Democratic	David A. Tunno	85,684	48.78
American Independent	William E. Pasley	2,481	1.41
Total votes		175,644	100.00
Turnout			
Republican gain from Democratic			

== See also ==
- 92nd United States Congress
- Political party strength in California
- Political party strength in U.S. states
- 1970 United States House of Representatives elections
