= 1966 United States House of Representatives elections in California =

- November 8, 1966

All 38 California seats to the United States House of Representatives
| | Majority party | Minority party |
|---|---|---|
| Party | Democratic | Republican |
| Last election | 25 | 13 |
| Seats won | 22 | 16 |
| Seat change | ▼3 | ▲3 |
| Popular vote | 2,937,862 | 3,336,943 |
| Percentage | 46.79% | 53.15% |
- Democratic gain Republican gain Democratic hold Republican hold

The United States House of Representatives elections in California, 1966 was an election for California's delegation to the United States House of Representatives, which occurred as part of the general election of the House of Representatives on November 8, 1966. Republicans gained three seats from the Democrats. There was a mid-decade redistricting of the California districts in 1966.

== Overview ==
United States House of Representatives elections in California, 1966
| Party | Votes | % | Before | After | +/– |
|---|---|---|---|---|---|
| Republican | 3,336,943 | 53.15% | 13 | 16 | +3 |
| Democratic | 2,937,862 | 46.79% | 25 | 22 | -3 |
| Scattering | 3,796 | 0.06% | 0 | 0 | 0 |
| Totals | 6,278,601 | 100.00% | 38 | 38 | — |

== Results ==
Final results from the Clerk of the House of Representatives:

=== District 1 ===
California's 1st congressional district election, 1966
| Party | Candidate | Votes | % |
|---|---|---|---|
| Republican | Don H. Clausen (incumbent) | 143,755 | 64.86 |
| Democratic | Thomas T. Storer | 77,000 | 34.74 |
| No party | Scattering | 888 | 0.40 |
| Total votes | | 221,643 | 100.00 |
| Turnout | | | |
| Republican hold | | | |

=== District 2 ===
California's 2nd congressional district election, 1966
| Party | Candidate | Votes | % |
|---|---|---|---|
| Democratic | Harold T. Johnson (incumbent) | 131,145 | 70.91 |
| Republican | William H. Romack, Jr. | 53,753 | 29.06 |
| No party | Scattering | 54 | 0.03 |
| Total votes | | 184,952 | 100.00 |
| Turnout | | | |
| Democratic hold | | | |

=== District 3 ===
California's 3rd congressional district election, 1966
| Party | Candidate | Votes | % |
|---|---|---|---|
| Democratic | John E. Moss (incumbent) | 143,177 | 67.46 |
| Republican | Terry G. Feil | 69,057 | 32.54 |
| No party | Scattering | 17 | 0.01 |
| Total votes | | 212,251 | 100.00 |
| Turnout | | | |
| Democratic hold | | | |

=== District 4 ===
California's 4th congressional district election, 1966
| Party | Candidate | Votes | % |
|---|---|---|---|
| Democratic | Robert L. Leggett (incumbent) | 67,942 | 59.45 |
| Republican | Tom McHatton | 46,337 | 40.54 |
| No party | Scattering | 7 | 0.01 |
| Total votes | | 114,286 | 100.00 |
| Turnout | | | |
| Democratic hold | | | |

=== District 5 ===
California's 5th congressional district election, 1966
| Party | Candidate | Votes | % |
|---|---|---|---|
| Democratic | Phillip Burton (incumbent) | 56,476 | 71.26 |
| Republican | Terry R. Macken | 22,778 | 28.74 |
| No party | Scattering | 0 | 0.00 |
| Total votes | | 79,254 | 100.00 |
| Turnout | | | |
| Democratic hold | | | |

=== District 6 ===
California's 6th congressional district election, 1966
| Party | Candidate | Votes | % |
|---|---|---|---|
| Republican | William S. Mailliard (incumbent) | 132,506 | 76.58 |
| Democratic | Le Rue Grim | 40,514 | 23.42 |
| No party | Scattering | 0 | 0.00 |
| Total votes | | 173,020 | 100.00 |
| Turnout | | | |
| Democratic hold | | | |

=== District 7 ===
California's 7th congressional district election, 1966
| Party | Candidate | Votes | % |
|---|---|---|---|
| Democratic | Jeffery Cohelan (incumbent) | 84,644 | 63.89 |
| Republican | Malcolm M. Champlin | 46,763 | 35.30 |
| No party | Scattering | 1,077 | 0.81 |
| Total votes | | 132,484 | 100.00 |
| Turnout | | | |
| Democratic hold | | | |

=== District 8 ===
California's 8th congressional district election, 1966
| Party | Candidate | Votes | % |
|---|---|---|---|
| Democratic | George P. Miller (incumbent) | 92,263 | 65.43 |
| Republican | Raymond P. Britton | 48,727 | 34.55 |
| No party | Scattering | 24 | 0.02 |
| Total votes | | 141,014 | 100.00 |
| Turnout | | | |
| Democratic hold | | | |

=== District 9 ===
California's 9th congressional district election, 1966
| Party | Candidate | Votes | % |
|---|---|---|---|
| Democratic | Don Edwards (incumbent) | 97,311 | 63.14 |
| Republican | Wilbur G. Durkee | 56,784 | 36.85 |
| No party | Scattering | 15 | 0.01 |
| Total votes | | 154,110 | 100.00 |
| Turnout | | | |
| Democratic hold | | | |

=== District 10 ===
California's 10th congressional district election, 1966
| Party | Candidate | Votes | % |
|---|---|---|---|
| Republican | Charles S. Gubser (incumbent) | 156,549 | 69.09 |
| Democratic | George Leppert | 70,013 | 30.90 |
| No party | Scattering | 10 | 0.00 |
| Total votes | | 226,572 | 100.00 |
| Turnout | | | |
| Republican hold | | | |

=== District 11 ===
California's 11th congressional district election, 1966
| Party | Candidate | Votes | % |
|---|---|---|---|
| Republican | J. Arthur Younger (incumbent) | 113,679 | 59.40 |
| Democratic | W. Mark Sullivan | 77,605 | 40.55 |
| No party | Scattering | 88 | 0.05 |
| Total votes | | 191,372 | 100.00 |
| Turnout | | | |
| Republican hold | | | |

=== District 12 ===
California's 12th congressional district election, 1966
| Party | Candidate | Votes | % |
|---|---|---|---|
| Republican | Burt L. Talcott (incumbent) | 108,070 | 77.24 |
| Democratic | Gerald V. Barron | 31,787 | 22.72 |
| No party | Scattering | 52 | 0.04 |
| Total votes | | 139,909 | 100.00 |
| Turnout | | | |
| Republican hold | | | |

=== District 13 ===
California's 13th congressional district election, 1966
| Party | Candidate | Votes | % |
|---|---|---|---|
| Republican | Charles M. Teague (incumbent) | 116,701 | 67.45 |
| Democratic | Charles A. Storke | 56,240 | 32.51 |
| No party | Scattering | 69 | 0.04 |
| Total votes | | 173,010 | 100.00 |
| Turnout | | | |
| Republican hold | | | |

=== District 14 ===
California's 14th congressional district election, 1966
| Party | Candidate | Votes | % |
|---|---|---|---|
| Democratic | Jerome Waldie (incumbent) | 108,668 | 56.38 |
| Republican | Frank J. Newman | 83,878 | 43.52 |
| No party | Scattering | 206 | 0.11 |
| Total votes | | 192,752 | 100.00 |
| Turnout | | | |
| Democratic hold | | | |

=== District 15 ===
California's 15th congressional district election, 1966
| Party | Candidate | Votes | % |
|---|---|---|---|
| Democratic | John J. McFall (incumbent) | 81,733 | 57.04 |
| Republican | Sam Van Dyken | 61,550 | 42.96 |
| No party | Scattering | 5 | 0.00 |
| Total votes | | 143,288 | 100.00 |
| Turnout | | | |
| Democratic hold | | | |

=== District 16 ===
California's 16th congressional district election, 1966
| Party | Candidate | Votes | % |
|---|---|---|---|
| Democratic | Bernice F. Sisk (incumbent) | 118,063 | 71.30 |
| Republican | Cecil F. White | 47,329 | 28.58 |
| No party | Scattering | 187 | 0.11 |
| Total votes | | 165,579 | 100.00 |
| Turnout | | | |
| Democratic hold | | | |

=== District 17 ===
California's 17th congressional district election, 1966
| Party | Candidate | Votes | % |
|---|---|---|---|
| Democratic | Cecil R. King (incumbent) | 76,962 | 60.80 |
| Republican | Don Cortum | 49,615 | 39.20 |
| No party | Scattering | 7 | 0.01 |
| Total votes | | 126,584 | 100.00 |
| Turnout | | | |
| Democratic hold | | | |

=== District 18 ===
California's 18th congressional district election, 1966
| Party | Candidate | Votes | % |
|---|---|---|---|
| Republican | Bob Mathias | 96,699 | 55.88 |
| Democratic | Harlan Hagen (incumbent) | 76,346 | 44.12 |
| No party | Scattering | 13 | 0.01 |
| Total votes | | 173,058 | 100.00 |
| Turnout | | | |
| Republican gain from Democratic | | | |

=== District 19 ===
California's 19th congressional district election, 1966
| Party | Candidate | Votes | % |
|---|---|---|---|
| Democratic | Chet Holifield (incumbent) | 82,592 | 62.24 |
| Republican | William R. Sutton | 50,068 | 37.73 |
| No party | Scattering | 46 | 0.03 |
| Total votes | | 132,706 | 100.00 |
| Turnout | | | |
| Democratic hold | | | |

=== District 20 ===
California's 20th congressional district election, 1966
| Party | Candidate | Votes | % |
|---|---|---|---|
| Republican | H. Allen Smith (incumbent) | 128,896 | 73.37 |
| Democratic | Raymond Freschi | 46,730 | 26.60 |
| No party | Scattering | 63 | 0.04 |
| Total votes | | 175,689 | 100.00 |
| Turnout | | | |
| Republican hold | | | |

=== District 21 ===
California's 21st congressional district election, 1966
| Party | Candidate | Votes | % |
|---|---|---|---|
| Democratic | Augustus F. Hawkins (incumbent) | 74,216 | 84.80 |
| Republican | Rayfield Lundy | 13,294 | 15.19 |
| No party | Scattering | 12 | 0.01 |
| Total votes | | 87,522 | 100.00 |
| Turnout | | | |
| Democratic hold | | | |

=== District 22 ===
California's 22nd congressional district election, 1966
| Party | Candidate | Votes | % |
|---|---|---|---|
| Democratic | James C. Corman (incumbent) | 94,420 | 53.45 |
| Republican | Robert C. Cline | 82,207 | 46.54 |
| No party | Scattering | 29 | 0.02 |
| Total votes | | 176,656 | 100.00 |
| Turnout | | | |
| Democratic hold | | | |

=== District 23 ===
California's 23rd congressional district election, 1966
| Party | Candidate | Votes | % |
|---|---|---|---|
| Republican | Del M. Clawson (incumbent) | 93,320 | 67.39 |
| Democratic | Ed O'Connor | 45,141 | 32.60 |
| No party | Scattering | 13 | 0.01 |
| Total votes | | 138,474 | 100.00 |
| Turnout | | | |
| Republican hold | | | |

=== District 24 ===
California's 24th congressional district election, 1966
| Party | Candidate | Votes | % |
|---|---|---|---|
| Republican | Glenard P. Lipscomb (incumbent) | 148,190 | 76.21 |
| Democratic | Earl G. McNall | 46,115 | 23.72 |
| No party | Scattering | 141 | 0.07 |
| Total votes | | 194,446 | 100.00 |
| Turnout | | | |
| Republican hold | | | |

=== District 25 ===
California's 25th congressional district election, 1966
| Party | Candidate | Votes | % |
|---|---|---|---|
| Republican | Charles E. Wiggins | 70,154 | 52.55 |
| Democratic | Ronald B. Cameron (incumbent) | 63,345 | 47.45 |
| No party | Scattering | 13 | 0.01 |
| Total votes | | 133,512 | 100.00 |
| Turnout | | | |
| Republican gain from Democratic | | | |

=== District 26 ===
California's 26th congressional district election, 1966
| Party | Candidate | Votes | % |
|---|---|---|---|
| Democratic | Thomas M. Rees (incumbent) | 103,289 | 62.32 |
| Republican | Irving Teichner | 62,441 | 37.67 |
| No party | Scattering | 20 | 0.01 |
| Total votes | | 165,750 | 100.00 |
| Turnout | | | |
| Democratic hold | | | |

=== District 27 ===
California's 27th congressional district election, 1966
| Party | Candidate | Votes | % |
|---|---|---|---|
| Republican | Edwin Reinecke (incumbent) | 93,890 | 65.33 |
| Democratic | John A. "Jack" Howard | 49,785 | 34.64 |
| No party | Scattering | 42 | 0.03 |
| Total votes | | 143,717 | 100.00 |
| Turnout | | | |
| Republican hold | | | |

=== District 28 ===
California's 28th congressional district election, 1966
| Party | Candidate | Votes | % |
|---|---|---|---|
| Republican | Alphonzo E. Bell, Jr. (incumbent) | 211,404 | 72.28 |
| Democratic | Lawrence "Lorry" Sherman | 81,007 | 27.70 |
| No party | Scattering | 80 | 0.03 |
| Total votes | | 292,491 | 100.00 |
| Turnout | | | |
| Republican hold | | | |

=== District 29 ===
California's 29th congressional district election, 1966
| Party | Candidate | Votes | % |
|---|---|---|---|
| Democratic | George Brown, Jr. (incumbent) | 69,115 | 51.12 |
| Republican | Bill Orozco | 66,079 | 48.87 |
| No party | Scattering | 8 | 0.01 |
| Total votes | | 135,202 | 100.00 |
| Turnout | | | |
| Democratic hold | | | |

=== District 30 ===
California's 30th congressional district election, 1966
| Party | Candidate | Votes | % |
|---|---|---|---|
| Democratic | Edward R. Roybal (incumbent) | 72,173 | 66.40 |
| Republican | Henri O'Bryant, Jr. | 36,506 | 33.58 |
| No party | Scattering | 20 | 0.02 |
| Total votes | | 108,699 | 100.00 |
| Turnout | | | |
| Democratic hold | | | |

=== District 31 ===
California's 31st congressional district election, 1966
| Party | Candidate | Votes | % |
|---|---|---|---|
| Democratic | Charles H. Wilson (incumbent) | 92,875 | 63.35 |
| Republican | Theodore Smith | 53,708 | 36.63 |
| No party | Scattering | 22 | 0.02 |
| Total votes | | 146,605 | 100.00 |
| Turnout | | | |
| Democratic hold | | | |

=== District 32 ===
California's 32nd congressional district election, 1966
| Party | Candidate | Votes | % |
|---|---|---|---|
| Republican | Craig Hosmer (incumbent) | 139,328 | 80.09 |
| Democratic | Tracy Odell | 34,609 | 19.90 |
| No party | Scattering | 17 | 0.01 |
| Total votes | | 173,954 | 100.00 |
| Turnout | | | |
| Republican hold | | | |

=== District 33 ===
California's 33rd congressional district election, 1966
| Party | Candidate | Votes | % |
|---|---|---|---|
| Republican | Jerry Pettis | 102,401 | 53.48 |
| Democratic | Kenneth W. Dyal (incumbent) | 89,071 | 46.52 |
| No party | Scattering | 8 | 0.00 |
| Total votes | | 191,480 | 100.00 |
| Turnout | | | |
| Republican gain from Democratic | | | |

=== District 34 ===
California's 34th congressional district election, 1966
| Party | Candidate | Votes | % |
|---|---|---|---|
| Democratic | Richard T. Hanna (incumbent) | 127,976 | 55.79 |
| Republican | Frank LaMagna | 101,410 | 44.21 |
| No party | Scattering | 5 | 0.00 |
| Total votes | | 129,391 | 100.00 |
| Turnout | | | |
| Democratic hold | | | |

=== District 35 ===
California's 35th congressional district election, 1966
| Party | Candidate | Votes | % |
|---|---|---|---|
| Republican | James B. Utt (incumbent) | 189,582 | 73.06 |
| Democratic | Thomas B. Lenhart | 69,873 | 26.93 |
| No party | Scattering | 21 | 0.01 |
| Total votes | | 259,476 | 100.00 |
| Turnout | | | |
| Republican hold | | | |

=== District 36 ===
California's 36th congressional district election, 1966
| Party | Candidate | Votes | % |
|---|---|---|---|
| Republican | Bob Wilson (incumbent) | 119,274 | 72.74 |
| Democratic | Don Lindgren | 44,365 | 27.06 |
| No party | Scattering | 340 | 0.21 |
| Total votes | | 163,979 | 100.00 |
| Turnout | | | |
| Republican hold | | | |

=== District 37 ===
California's 37th congressional district election, 1966
| Party | Candidate | Votes | % |
|---|---|---|---|
| Democratic | Lionel Van Deerlin (incumbent) | 80,060 | 61.14 |
| Republican | Samuel S. Vener | 50,817 | 38.81 |
| No party | Scattering | 63 | 0.05 |
| Total votes | | 130,940 | 100.00 |
| Turnout | | | |
| Democratic hold | | | |

=== District 38 ===
California's 38th congressional district election, 1966
| Party | Candidate | Votes | % |
|---|---|---|---|
| Democratic | John V. Tunney (incumbent) | 83,216 | 54.47 |
| Republican | Robert R. Barry | 69,444 | 45.46 |
| No party | Scattering | 114 | 0.07 |
| Total votes | | 152,774 | 100.00 |
| Turnout | | | |
| Democratic hold | | | |

== See also ==
- 90th United States Congress
- Political party strength in California
- Political party strength in U.S. states
- 1966 United States House of Representatives elections
