= California's 33rd congressional district =

U.S. House district for California

Coordinates: 34°02′49″N 118°47′00″W

- Interactive map of district boundaries
- Representative: Pete Aguilar; D–Redlands
- Population (2025): 777,660
- Median household income: $95,350
- Ethnicity: 62.0% Hispanic; 17.5% White; 9.8% Black; 7.0% Asian; 2.6% Two or more races; 1.1% other
- Cook PVI: D+7

California's 33rd congressional district is a congressional district in the U.S. state of California. The district is represented as of 2023 by Democrat Pete Aguilar.

From January 3, 2023, following the 2020 redistricting cycle, the district centered on San Bernardino.

== Recent election results from statewide races ==
=== 2023–2027 boundaries ===
Year	Office	Results
2008	President	Obama 62% - 37%
2010	Governor	Brown 55% - 37%
2010	Lt. Governor	Newsom 48% - 35%
2010	Secretary of State	Bowen 54% - 35%
2010	Attorney General	Harris 46% - 44%
2010	Treasurer	Lockyer 58% - 33%
2010	Controller	Chiang 54% - 34%
2012	President	Obama 64% - 36%
2014	Governor	Brown 56% - 44%
2016	President	Clinton 62% - 32%
2018	Governor	Newsom 61% - 39%
2018	Attorney General	Becerra 63% - 37%
2020	President	Biden 62% - 36%
2022	Senate (Reg.)	Padilla 57% - 43%
2022	Governor	Newsom 55% - 45%
2022	Lt. Governor	Kounalakis 55% - 45%
2022	Secretary of State	Weber 56% - 44%
2022	Attorney General	Bonta 55% - 45%
2022	Treasurer	Ma 54% - 46%
2022	Controller	Cohen 54% - 46%
2024	President	Harris 53% - 44%
2024	Senate (Reg.)	Schiff 54% - 46%

=== 2027–2033 boundaries ===
Year	Office	Results
2008	President	Obama 62% - 37%
2010	Governor	Brown 55% - 37%
2010	Lt. Governor	Newsom 48% - 35%
2010	Secretary of State	Bowen 54% - 35%
2010	Attorney General	Harris 46% - 44%
2010	Treasurer	Lockyer 58% - 33%
2010	Controller	Chiang 54% - 34%
2012	President	Obama 64% - 36%
2014	Governor	Brown 56% - 44%
2016	President	Clinton 62% - 32%
2018	Governor	Newsom 61% - 39%
2018	Attorney General	Becerra 63% - 37%
2020	President	Biden 62% - 36%
2022	Senate (Reg.)	Padilla 57% - 43%
2022	Governor	Newsom 55% - 45%
2022	Lt. Governor	Kounalakis 55% - 45%
2022	Secretary of State	Weber 56% - 44%
2022	Attorney General	Bonta 55% - 45%
2022	Treasurer	Ma 54% - 46%
2022	Controller	Cohen 54% - 46%
2024	President	Harris 53% - 44%
2024	Senate (Reg.)	Schiff 54% - 46%

== Composition ==
FIPS County Code	County	Seat	Population
71	San Bernardino	San Bernardino	2,195,611

Under the 2020 redistricting, California's 33rd congressional district is located in Southern California, taking up a part of southwestern San Bernardino County. It includes most of San Bernardino, northern Redlands, Bloomington, western Highland, most of Colton, Grand Terrace, Rialto, Fontana, central Rancho Cucamonga, and a small portion of Loma Linda; and the census-designated places Bloomington, Muscoy, and western Mentone.

San Bernardino County is split between this district and the 23rd, 28th and 35th districts. The 33rd, 23rd and 28th districts are partitioned by Carnelian St, Highway 30, Amethyst Ave, Highland Ave, Foothill Freeway, Day Creek Blvd, Vintage Dr, Saddle Tree Pl, Day Creek Channel, Wardman Bullock Rd, Dawnridge Dr, Summit Ave, 14509 Saddlepeak Dr-14560 Labrador Ave, Ontario Freeway, Union Pacific Railroad, Highway 15, Highway 215, W Meyers Rd, Ohio Ave, Pine Ave, Bailey act, Highway 206, Devils Canyon Rd, Cloudland Truck Trail, Cloudland Cutoff, Hill Dr, W 54th St, E Hill Dr, Bonita Vista Dr, Sterling Ave, Argyle Ave, E Marshall Blvd, Rockford Ave, Lynwood Dr, La Praix St, Orchid Dr, Denair Ave, Highland Ave, Orchard Rd, Arroyo Vista Dr, Church St, Greensport Rd, Florida St, Garnet St, Nice Ave, Crafton Ave, 5th Ave, Walnut St, 6th Ave, S Wabash Ave, E Citrus Ave, N Church St, Southern California Regional Rail A, Tennessee St, Highway 10, California St, E Washington St, and S Barton Rd.

The 33rd and 35th districts are partitioned by San Bernardino Rd, Orangewood Dr, Estacia St, Lion St, Highway 66, Helms Ave, Hampshire St, Archibald Ave, N Maple Ave, S Maple Ave, Randall Ave, Alder Ave, Union Pacific Railroad, Slover Ave, Tamarind Ave, Jurupa Ave, 11th St, and Locust Ave.

=== Cities and CDPs with 10,000 or more people ===
- San Bernardino – 222,101
- Fontana – 212,704
- Rancho Cucamonga –174,405
- Rialto – 104,026
- Redlands – 73,168
- Highland – 55,999
- Colton – 53,909
- Loma Linda – 24,719
- Bloomington – 24,339
- Grand Terrace – 13,150
- Muscoy – 10,719

=== 2,500 – 10,000 people ===
- Mentone – 9,557

== List of members representing the district ==
Member	Party	Dates	Cong ress(es)	Electoral history	Counties
District created January 3, 1963
Harry R. Sheppard (Yucaipa)	Democratic	January 3, 1963 – January 3, 1965	88th	Redistricted from the 27th district and re-elected in 1962. Retired.	1963–1969; San Bernardino
Kenneth W. Dyal (San Bernardino)	Democratic	January 3, 1965 – January 3, 1967	89th	Elected in 1964. Lost re-election.	1963–1969; San Bernardino
Jerry Pettis (Loma Linda)	Republican	January 3, 1967 – January 3, 1975	90th 91st 92nd 93rd	Elected in 1966. Re-elected in 1968. Re-elected in 1970. Re-elected in 1972. Redistricted to the 37th district.	1963–1969; San Bernardino
Jerry Pettis (Loma Linda)	Republican	January 3, 1967 – January 3, 1975	90th 91st 92nd 93rd	Elected in 1966. Re-elected in 1968. Re-elected in 1970. Re-elected in 1972. Redistricted to the 37th district.	1969–1973; San Bernardino
Jerry Pettis (Loma Linda)	Republican	January 3, 1967 – January 3, 1975	90th 91st 92nd 93rd	Elected in 1966. Re-elected in 1968. Re-elected in 1970. Re-elected in 1972. Redistricted to the 37th district.	1973–1975; San Bernardino
Del M. Clawson (Downey)	Republican	January 3, 1975 – December 31, 1978	94th 95th	Redistricted from the 23rd district and re-elected in 1974. Re-elected in 1976. Resigned.	1975–1983; Los Angeles
Vacant		December 31, 1978 – January 3, 1979	95th		1975–1983; Los Angeles
Wayne R. Grisham (La Mirada)	Republican	January 3, 1979 – January 3, 1983	96th 97th	Elected in 1978. Re-elected in 1980. Lost renomination.	1975–1983; Los Angeles
David Dreier (Claremont)	Republican	January 3, 1983 – January 3, 1993	98th 99th 100th 101st 102nd	Redistricted from the 35th district and re-elected in 1982. Re-elected in 1984. Re-elected in 1986. Re-elected in 1988. Re-elected in 1990. Redistricted to the 28th district.	1983–1993; Los Angeles (eastern suburbs)
Lucille Roybal-Allard (Los Angeles)	Democratic	January 3, 1993 – January 3, 2003	103rd 104th 105th 106th 107th	Elected in 1992. Re-elected in 1994. Re-elected in 1996. Re-elected in 1998. Re-elected in 2000. Redistricted to the 34th district.	1993–2003; Los Angeles (Downtown Los Angeles)
Diane Watson (Los Angeles)	Democratic	January 3, 2003 – January 3, 2011	108th 109th 110th 111th	Redistricted from the 32nd district and re-elected in 2002. Re-elected in 2004. Re-elected in 2006. Re-elected in 2008. Retired.	2003–2013 Los Angeles (Culver City, Ladera Heights and Baldwin Hills)
Karen Bass (Los Angeles)	Democratic	January 3, 2011 – January 3, 2013	112th	Elected in 2010. Redistricted to the 37th district.	2003–2013 Los Angeles (Culver City, Ladera Heights and Baldwin Hills)
Henry Waxman (Los Angeles)	Democratic	January 3, 2013 – January 3, 2015	113th	Redistricted from the 30th district and re-elected in 2012. Retired.	2013–2023 Los Angeles (Beverly Hills and Santa Monica)
Ted Lieu (Torrance)	Democratic	January 3, 2015 – January 3, 2023	114th 115th 116th 117th	Elected in 2014. Re-elected in 2016. Re-elected in 2018. Re-elected in 2020. Redistricted to the 36th district.	2013–2023 Los Angeles (Beverly Hills and Santa Monica)
Pete Aguilar (Redlands)	Democratic	January 3, 2023 – present	118th 119th	Redistricted from the 31st district and re-elected in 2022. Re-elected in 2024. Re-elected in 2026.	2023–present Inland Empire region, including the city of San Bernardino and portions of Rancho Cucamonga and Redlands, California.

== Election results ==
=== 1962 ===
1962 United States House of Representatives elections in California
Party	Candidate	Votes	%
Democratic	Harry R. Sheppard (Incumbent)	96,192	59.0
Republican	William R. Thomas	66,764	41.0
Total votes		162,956	100.0
Democratic hold			

=== 1964 ===
1964 United States House of Representatives elections in California
Party	Candidate	Votes	%
Democratic	Kenneth W. Dyal	109,047	51.7
Republican	Jerry Pettis	101,742	48.3
Total votes		210,789	100.0
Democratic hold			

=== 1966 ===
1966 United States House of Representatives elections in California
Party	Candidate	Votes	%
Republican	Jerry Pettis	102,401	53.5
Democratic	Kenneth W. Dyal (incumbent)	89,071	46.5
Total votes		191,472	100.0
Republican gain from Democratic			

=== 1968 ===
1968 United States House of Representatives elections in California
Party	Candidate	Votes	%
Republican	Jerry Pettis (Incumbent)	123,426	66.3
Democratic	Al C. Bellard	59,619	32.0
American Independent	Earl D. Wallen	3,171	1.7
Total votes		186,216	100.0
Republican hold			

=== 1970 ===
1970 United States House of Representatives elections in California
Party	Candidate	Votes	%
Republican	Jerry Pettis (Incumbent)	116,093	72.2
Democratic	Chester M. Wright	44,764	27.8
Total votes		160,857	100.0
Republican hold			

=== 1972 ===
1972 United States House of Representatives elections in California
Party	Candidate	Votes	%
Republican	Jerry Pettis (Incumbent)	140,304	75.1
Democratic	Ken Thompson	46,626	24.9
Total votes		186,930	100.0
Republican hold			

=== 1974 ===
1974 United States House of Representatives elections in California
Party	Candidate	Votes	%
Republican	Del M. Clawson (Incumbent)	71,054	53.4
Democratic	Robert E. "Bob" White	57,423	43.1
American Independent	James C. "Jim" Griffin	4,636	3.5
Total votes		133,113	100.0
Republican hold			

=== 1976 ===
1976 United States House of Representatives elections in California
Party	Candidate	Votes	%
Republican	Del M. Clawson (Incumbent)	95,398	55.1
Democratic	Ted Snyder	77,807	44.9
Total votes		173,205	100.0
Republican hold			

=== 1978 ===
1978 United States House of Representatives elections in California
Party	Candidate	Votes	%
Republican	Wayne R. Grisham	79,533	56.0
Democratic	Dennis S. Kazarian	62,540	44.0
Total votes		142,073	100.0
Republican hold			

=== 1980 ===
1980 United States House of Representatives elections in California
Party	Candidate	Votes	%
Republican	Wayne R. Grisham (Incumbent)	122,439	70.9
Democratic	Fred L. Anderson	50,365	29.1
Total votes		172,804	100.0
Republican hold			

=== 1982 ===
1982 United States House of Representatives elections in California
Party	Candidate	Votes	%
Republican	David Dreier (Incumbent)	112,362	65.2
Democratic	Paul Servelle	55,514	32.2
Libertarian	Phillips B. Franklin	2,251	1.3
Peace and Freedom	James Michael "Mike" Noonan	2,223	1.3
Total votes		172,350	100.0
Republican hold			

=== 1984 ===
1984 United States House of Representatives elections in California
Party	Candidate	Votes	%
Republican	David Dreier (Incumbent)	147,363	70.6
Democratic	Claire K. McDonald	54,147	26.0
Libertarian	Gail Lightfoot	4,738	2.3
Peace and Freedom	James Michael "Mike" Noonan	2,371	1.1
Total votes		208,619	100.0
Republican hold			

=== 1986 ===
1986 United States House of Representatives elections in California
Party	Candidate	Votes	%
Republican	David Dreier (Incumbent)	118,541	71.7
Democratic	Monty Hempel	44,312	26.8
Peace and Freedom	James Michael "Mike" Noonan	2,500	1.5
Total votes		165,353	100.0
Republican hold			

=== 1988 ===
1988 United States House of Representatives elections in California
Party	Candidate	Votes	%
Republican	David Dreier (Incumbent)	151,704	69.2
Democratic	Nelson Gentry	57,586	26.2
Libertarian	Gail Lightfoot	6,601	3.0
Peace and Freedom	James Michael "Mike" Noonan	3,492	1.6
Total votes		219,383	100.0
Republican hold			

=== 1990 ===
1990 United States House of Representatives elections in California
Party	Candidate	Votes	%
Republican	David Dreier (Incumbent)	101,336	63.7
Democratic	Georgia Houston Webb	49,981	31.4
Libertarian	Gail Lightfoot	7,840	4.9
Total votes		159,157	100.0
Republican hold			

=== 1992 ===
1992 United States House of Representatives elections in California
Party	Candidate	Votes	%
Democratic	Lucille Roybal-Allard	32,010	63.0
Republican	Robert Guzman	15,428	30.4
Peace and Freedom	Tim Delia	2,135	4.2
Libertarian	Dale S. Olvera	1,206	2.4
Total votes		50,779	100.0
Democratic hold			

=== 1994 ===
1994 United States House of Representatives elections in California
Party	Candidate	Votes	%
Democratic	Lucille Roybal-Allard (Incumbent)	33,814	81.5
Peace and Freedom	Kermit Booker	7,694	18.5
Total votes		41,508	100.0
Democratic hold			

=== 1996 ===
1996 United States House of Representatives elections in California
Party	Candidate	Votes	%
Democratic	Lucille Roybal-Allard (Incumbent)	47,478	82.2
Republican	John Leonard	8,147	14.0
Libertarian	Howard Johnson	2,203	3.8
Total votes		57,828	100.0
Democratic hold			

=== 1998 ===
1998 United States House of Representatives elections in California
Party	Candidate	Votes	%
Democratic	Lucille Roybal-Allard (Incumbent)	43,310	87.2
Republican	Wayne Miller	6,364	12.8
Total votes		49,674	100.0
Democratic hold			

=== 2000 ===
2000 United States House of Representatives elections in California
Party	Candidate	Votes	%
Democratic	Lucille Roybal-Allard (Incumbent)	60,510	84.6
Republican	Wayne Miller	8,260	11.6
Libertarian	Nathan Thomas Craddock	1,601	2.2
Natural Law	William Harpur	1,200	1.6
Total votes		71,571	100.0
Democratic hold			

=== 2002 ===
2002 United States House of Representatives elections in California
Party	Candidate	Votes	%
Democratic	Diane Watson (Incumbent)	97,779	82.6
Republican	Andrew Kim	16,699	14.1
Libertarian	Charles Tate	3,971	3.3
Total votes		118,449	100.0
Democratic hold			

=== 2004 ===
2004 United States House of Representatives elections in California
Party	Candidate	Votes	%
Democratic	Diane Watson (Incumbent)	166,801	88.6
Libertarian	Robert G. Weber Jr.	21,513	11.4
Total votes		188,314	100.0
Democratic hold			

=== 2006 ===
2006 United States House of Representatives elections in California
Party	Candidate	Votes	%
Democratic	Diane Watson (Incumbent)	113,715	100.0
Democratic hold			

=== 2008 ===
2008 United States House of Representatives elections in California
Party	Candidate	Votes	%
Democratic	Diane Watson (Incumbent)	186,924	87.6
Republican	David Crowley	26,536	12.4
Total votes		213,460	100.0
Turnout			70.2
Democratic hold			

=== 2010 ===
2010 United States House of Representatives elections in California
Party	Candidate	Votes	%
Democratic	Karen Bass	131,990	86.1
Republican	James L. Andion	21,342	13.9
Total votes		153,332	100.0
Democratic hold			

=== 2012 ===
2012 United States House of Representatives elections in California
Party	Candidate	Votes	%
Democratic	Henry Waxman (Incumbent)	171,860	54.0
Independent	Bill Bloomfield	146,660	46.0
Total votes		318,520	100.0
Democratic hold			

=== 2014 ===
2014 United States House of Representatives elections in California
Party	Candidate	Votes	%
Democratic	Ted Lieu	108,331	57.6
Republican	Elan Carr	79,700	42.4
Total votes		188,031	100.0
Democratic hold			

=== 2016 ===
2016 United States House of Representatives elections in California
Party	Candidate	Votes	%
Democratic	Ted Lieu (Incumbent)	219,397	66.4
Republican	Kenneth W. Wright	110,822	33.6
Total votes		330,219	100.0
Democratic hold			

=== 2018 ===
2018 United States House of Representatives elections in California
Party	Candidate	Votes	%
Democratic	Ted Lieu (Incumbent)	219,091	70.0
Republican	Kenneth W. Wright	93,769	30.0
Total votes		312,860	100.0
Democratic hold			

=== 2020 ===
2020 United States House of Representatives elections in California
Party	Candidate	Votes	%
Democratic	Ted Lieu (Incumbent)	257,094	67.6
Republican	James P. Bradley	123,334	32.4
Total votes		380,428	100.0
Democratic hold			

=== 2022 ===
2022 United States House of Representatives elections in California
Party	Candidate	Votes	%
Democratic	Pete Aguilar (Incumbent)	76,588	57.7
Republican	John Mark Porter	56,119	42.3
Total votes		132,707	100.0
Democratic hold			

=== 2024 ===
California's 33rd congressional district, 2024
Primary election
Party	Candidate	Votes	%
Democratic	Pete Aguilar (incumbent)	45,065	57.1
Republican	Tom Herman	33,815	42.8
Republican	John Mark Porter (write-in)	104	0.1
Republican	Ernest Richter (write-in)	3	0.0
Total votes		78,987	100.0
General election
Democratic	Pete Aguilar (incumbent)	137,197	58.8
Republican	Tom Herman	96,078	41.2
Total votes		233,275	100.0
Democratic hold			

== Historical district boundaries ==
From 2003 to 2013, the district encompassed the incorporated city of Culver City (a center of film and TV production), and in the Baldwin Hills unincorporated areas such as Ladera Heights, and some of the western neighborhoods within the city of Los Angeles such as Baldwin Hills (neighborhood).

From 1993 to 2013, large parts of the 33rd were in the California's 36th congressional district. The 36th was located in southwestern Los Angeles County, and included Manhattan Beach, Torrance, and portions of Los Angeles itself. This district was largely dismantled after the 2010 census, with the 33rd succeeding the 36th, while the updated 36th is largely the successor of the old 45th district.

== See also ==
- List of United States congressional districts
- California's congressional districts
