= Shirley Neil Pettis =

American politician (1924–2016)

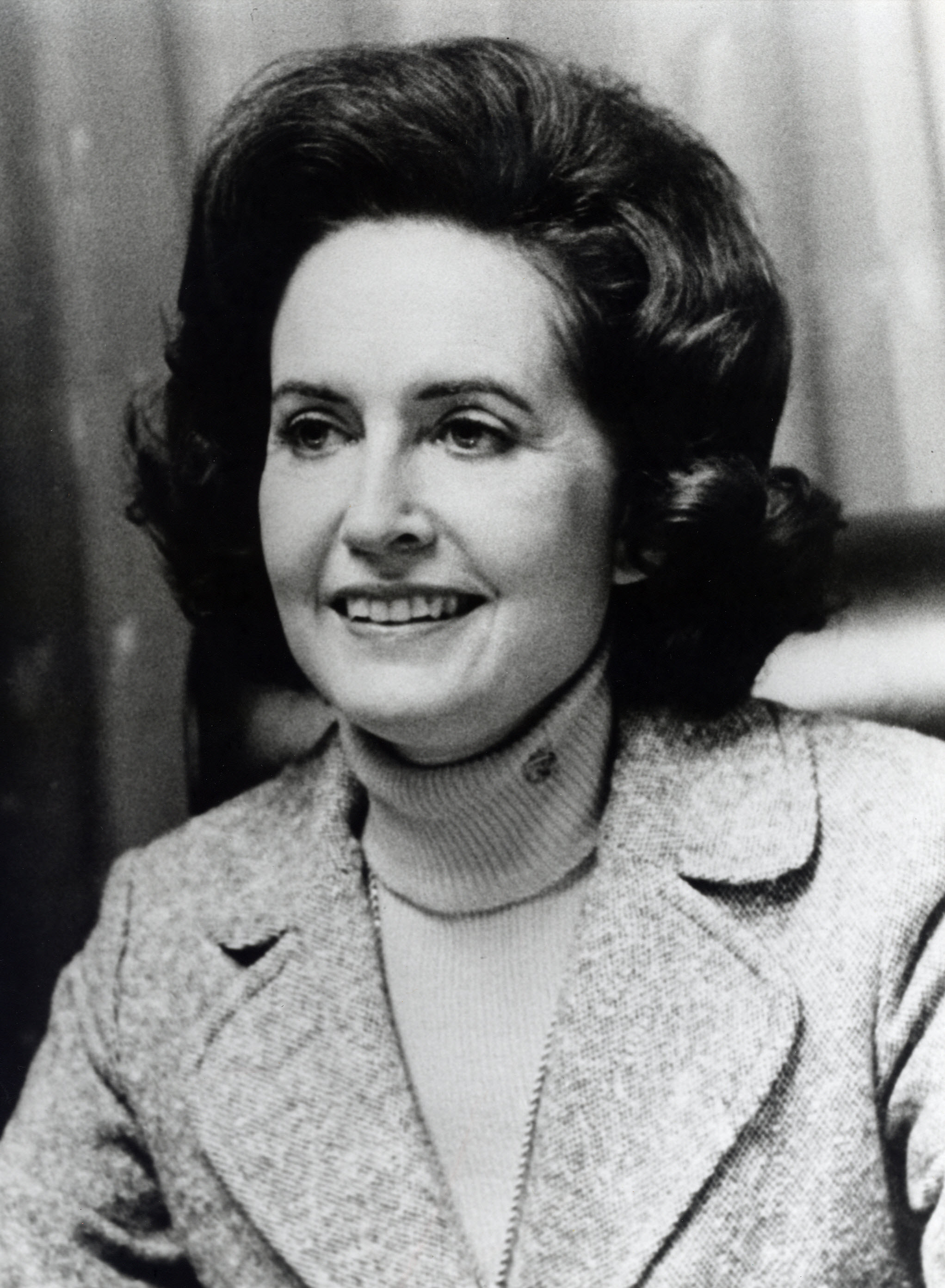

Member of the U.S. House of Representatives from California's 37th district
- In office April 29, 1975 – January 3, 1979
- Preceded by: Jerry Pettis
- Succeeded by: Jerry Lewis

Personal details
- Born: Shirley Neil McCumber; July 12, 1924 Mountain View, California, U.S.
- Died: December 30, 2016 (aged 92) Rancho Mirage, California, U.S.
- Party: Republican
- Spouse: Jerry Pettis
- Education: Andrews University; UC Berkeley

Shirley Neil Pettis (July 12, 1924 – December 30, 2016) was an American journalist and politician who served two terms as a U.S. representative from California between 1975 and 1979. She was first elected to fill the seat after her husband, Jerry Pettis, died in office.

== Early life and career ==
Born Shirley Neil McCumber on July 12, 1924, in Mountain View, California, Pettis attended elementary schools in Berkeley, California from 1931 to 1932, and Berrien Springs, Michigan, from 1933 to 1937.

=== Higher education ===
She graduated from Andrews Academy in 1942. She attended Andrews University from 1942 to 1943, and the University of California, Berkeley from 1944 to 1945.

=== Career ===
She was a co-founder and manager of Audio-Digest Foundation from 1950 to 1953, and a newspaper columnist for the Sun-Telegram, San Bernardino, California, from 1967 to 1970. Pettis served as vice president of the Republican Congressional Wives Club, 1975. She died in December 2016 at the age of 92.

== Tenure in Congress ==
Pettis was elected as a Republican to the Ninety-fourth Congress, in a special election held to fill the vacancy caused by the death of her husband, Jerry Pettis. Subsequently re-elected to the Ninety-fifth Congress, she served from April 29, 1975 – January 3, 1979. She did not seek renomination to Congress in 1978.

While a Member of Congress she served first on the House Interior Committee and then the House Foreign Affairs Committee. She secured passage of her late husband's California Desert Protection Act and the Joshua Tree Wilderness Act legislation.

== After Congress ==
She served as vice president, Women's Research and Education Institute, Washington, D.C. from 1980 to 1981.

She served as member of the Arms Control and Disarmament Commission from 1981 to 1983, and the Commission on Presidential Scholars from 1990 to 1992. She served as member of the board of directors, Kemper National Insurance Companies from 1979 to 1997.

=== Death ===
She died on December 30, 2016 in Rancho Mirage, California at the age of 92.

== Electoral history ==
1975 California's 37th congressional district special election
Party	Candidate	Votes	%
Republican	Shirley Neil Pettis	53,165	60.5
Democratic	Ron Pettis	12,940	14.7
Democratic	James L. Mayfield	11,140	12.7
Republican	Frank M. Bogert	4,773	5.4
American Independent	Bernard Wahl	1,378	1.6
Democratic	Joe E. Hubbs, Sr.	1,104	1.3
Republican	Louis Martinez	871	1.0
Republican	Jack H. Harrison	688	0.8
Republican	Bud Mathewson	555	0.6
Democratic	Clodeon Speed Adkins	488	0.6
Democratic	C. L. "Jimmie" James	308	0.3
Democratic	Richard "Doc" Welby	291	0.3
Republican	Robert J. Allenthorp	181	0.2
Total votes		88,882	100.0
Republican hold			

1976 United States House of Representatives elections in California
Party	Candidate	Votes	%
Republican	Shirley Neil Pettis (Incumbent)	133,634	71.1
Democratic	Douglas C. Nilson Jr.	49,021	26.1
American Independent	Bernard Wahl	5,352	2.8
Total votes		188,007	100.0
Republican hold			

== See also ==
- Women in the United States House of Representatives

U.S. House of Representatives
Preceded by Jerry Lyle Pettis	Member of the U.S. House of Representatives from California's 37th congressional district 1975–1979	Succeeded by Jerry Lewis
