= 1976 United States House of Representatives elections in California =

- November 2, 1976

All 43 California seats to the United States House of Representatives
	Majority party	Minority party
Party	Democratic	Republican
Last election	28	15
Seats won	29	14
Seat change	▲1	▼1
Popular vote	4,144,324	3,204,418
Percentage	55.80%	43.15%
- Democratic gain Democratic hold Republican hold

The California United States House elections, 1976 was an election for California's delegation to the United States House of Representatives, which occurred as part of the general election of the House of Representatives on November 2, 1976. Democrats picked up one district, the 16th.

== Overview ==
United States House of Representatives elections in California, 1976
Party	Votes	%	Before	After	+/–
Democratic	4,144,324	55.80%	28	29	+1
Republican	3,204,418	43.15%	15	14	-1
American Independent	39,786	0.54%	0	0	0
Independent	37,973	0.51%	0	0	0
Totals	7,426,501	100.00%	43	43	—

== Results ==
Final results from the Clerk of the House of Representatives:

=== District 1 ===
California's 1st congressional district election, 1976
Party	Candidate	Votes	%
Democratic	Harold T. Johnson (incumbent)	160,477	73.95
Republican	James E. Taylor	56,539	26.05
Total votes		217,016	100.00
Turnout			
Democratic hold			

=== District 2 ===
California's 2nd congressional district election, 1976
Party	Candidate	Votes	%
Republican	Don H. Clausen (incumbent)	121,290	56.01
Democratic	Oscar H. Klee	88,829	41.02
Peace and Freedom	Robert B. "Bob" Allred	6,444	2.98
Total votes		216,563	100
Turnout			
Republican hold			

=== District 3 ===
California's 3rd congressional district election, 1976
Party	Candidate	Votes	%
Democratic	John E. Moss (incumbent)	139,779	72.86
Republican	George R. Marsh, Jr.	52,075	27.14
Total votes		191,854	100.00
Turnout			
Democratic hold			

=== District 4 ===
California's 4th congressional district election, 1976
Party	Candidate	Votes	%
Democratic	Robert L. Leggett (incumbent)	75,844	50.22
Republican	Rex Hime	75,193	49.78
Total votes		151,037	100.00
Turnout			
Democratic hold			

=== District 5 ===
California's 5th congressional district election, 1976
Party	Candidate	Votes	%
Democratic	John L. Burton (incumbent)	103,746	61.84
Republican	Branwell Fanning	64,008	38.16
Total votes		167,754	100.00
Turnout			
Democratic hold			

=== District 6 ===
California's 6th congressional district election, 1976
Party	Candidate	Votes	%
Democratic	Phillip Burton (incumbent)	86,493	66.07
Republican	Tom Spinosa	35,359	27.01
Peace and Freedom	Emily L. Siegel	6,570	5.02
American Independent	Raymond O. "Ray" Heaps	2,494	1.91
Total votes		130,916	100.00
Turnout			
Democratic hold			

=== District 7 ===
California's 7th congressional district election, 1976
Party	Candidate	Votes	%
Democratic	George Miller (incumbent)	147,064	74.72
Republican	Robert L. Vickers	45,863	23.30
American Independent	Melvin E. Stanley	3,889	1.98
Total votes		196,816	100.00
Turnout			
Democratic hold			

=== District 8 ===
California's 8th congressional district election, 1976
Party	Candidate	Votes	%
Democratic	Ron Dellums (incumbent)	122,342	62.12
Republican	Philip Stiles Breck Jr.	68,374	34.72
Peace and Freedom	Robert J. Evans	6,238	3.17
Total votes		196,954	100.00
Turnout			
Democratic hold			

=== District 9 ===
California's 9th congressional district election, 1976
Party	Candidate	Votes	%
Democratic	Pete Stark (incumbent)	116,398	70.81
Republican	James K. Mills	44,607	27.13
Peace and Freedom	Albert L. Sargis	3,386	2.06
Total votes		164,391	100.00
Turnout			
Democratic hold			

=== District 10 ===
California's 10th congressional district election, 1976
Party	Candidate	Votes	%
Democratic	Don Edwards (incumbent)	111,992	72.05
Republican	Herb Smith	38,088	24.50
American Independent	Edmon V. Kaiser	5,363	3.45
Total votes		155,443	100.00
Turnout			
Democratic hold			

=== District 11 ===
California's 11th congressional district election, 1976
Party	Candidate	Votes	%
Democratic	Leo Ryan (incumbent)	107,618	61.08
Republican	Bob Jones	62,435	35.44
American Independent	Nicholas Waeil Kudrovzeff	6,141	3.49
Total votes		176,194	100.00
Turnout			
Democratic hold			

=== District 12 ===
California's 12th congressional district election, 1976
Party	Candidate	Votes	%
Republican	Pete McCloskey (incumbent)	130,332	66.21
Democratic	David T. Harris	61,526	31.25
American Independent	Joseph David "Joss" Cooney	4,999	2.54
Total votes		196,857	100.00
Turnout			
Republican hold			

=== District 13 ===
California's 13th congressional district election, 1976
Party	Candidate	Votes	%
Democratic	Norman Mineta (incumbent)	135,291	66.77
Republican	Ernie Konnyu	63,130	31.16
American Independent	William Pollock Herrell	4,190	2.07
Total votes		202,611	100.00
Turnout			
Democratic hold			

=== District 14 ===
California's 14th congressional district election, 1976
Party	Candidate	Votes	%
Democratic	John J. McFall (incumbent)	123,285	72.54
Republican	Roger A. Blaine	46,674	27.46
Total votes		169,959	100.00
Turnout			
Democratic hold			

=== District 15 ===
California's 15th congressional district election, 1976
Party	Candidate	Votes	%
Democratic	Bernice F. Sisk (incumbent)	92,735	72.20
Republican	Carol Harner	35,700	27.80
Total votes		128,435	100.00
Turnout			
Democratic hold			

=== District 16 ===
California's 16th congressional district election, 1976
Party	Candidate	Votes	%
Democratic	Leon Panetta	104,545	53.42
Republican	Burt L. Talcott (incumbent)	91,160	46.58
Total votes		195,705	100.00
Turnout			
Democratic gain from Republican			

=== District 17 ===
California's 17th congressional district election, 1976
Party	Candidate	Votes	%
Democratic	John Hans Krebs (incumbent)	103,898	65.69
Republican	Henry J. Andreas	54,270	34.31
Total votes		158,168	100.00
Turnout			
Democratic hold			

=== District 18 ===
California's 18th congressional district election, 1976
Party	Candidate	Votes	%
Republican	William M. Ketchum (incumbent)	101,658	64.20
Democratic	Dean Close	56,683	35.80
Total votes		158,341	100.00
Turnout			
Republican hold			

=== District 19 ===
California's 19th congressional district election, 1976
Party	Candidate	Votes	%
Republican	Robert J. Lagomarsino (incumbent)	124,201	64.38
Democratic	Dan Sisson	68,722	35.62
Total votes		192,923	100.00
Turnout			
Republican hold			

=== District 20 ===
California's 20th congressional district election, 1976
Party	Candidate	Votes	%
Republican	Barry Goldwater, Jr. (incumbent)	146,158	67.25
Democratic	Patty Lear Corman	71,193	32.75
Total votes		217,351	100.00
Turnout			
Republican hold			

=== District 21 ===
California's 21st congressional district election, 1976
Party	Candidate	Votes	%
Democratic	James C. Corman (incumbent)	101,837	66.51
Republican	Erwin Ed Hogan	44,094	28.80
Peace and Freedom	Bill Hill	7,178	4.69
Total votes		153,109	100.00
Turnout			
Democratic hold			

=== District 22 ===
California's 22nd congressional district election, 1976
Party	Candidate	Votes	%
Republican	Carlos J. Moorhead (incumbent)	114,769	62.61
Democratic	Robert S. Henry	68,543	37.39
Total votes		183,312	100.00
Turnout			
Republican hold			

=== District 23 ===
California's 23rd congressional district election, 1976
Party	Candidate	Votes	%
Democratic	Anthony C. Beilenson	130,619	60.18
Republican	Thomas F. Bartman	86,434	39.82
Total votes		217,053	100.00
Turnout			
Democratic hold			

=== District 24 ===
California's 24th congressional district election, 1976
Party	Candidate	Votes	%
Democratic	Henry Waxman (incumbent)	108,296	67.78
Republican	David Irvins Simmons	51,478	32.22
Total votes		159,774	100.00
Turnout			
Democratic hold			

=== District 25 ===
California's 25th congressional district election, 1976
Party	Candidate	Votes	%
Democratic	Edward R. Roybal (incumbent)	57,966	71.90
Republican	Robert K. Watson	17,737	22.00
Peace and Freedom	Marilyn Seals	4,922	6.10
Total votes		80,625	100.00
Turnout			
Democratic hold			

=== District 26 ===
California's 26th congressional district election, 1976
Party	Candidate	Votes	%
Republican	John H. Rousselot (incumbent)	112,619	65.59
Democratic	Latta Bruce	59,093	34.41
Total votes		171,712	100.00
Turnout			
Republican hold			

=== District 27 ===
California's 27th congressional district election, 1976
Party	Candidate	Votes	%
Republican	Bob Dornan	114,623	54.68
Democratic	Gary Familian	94,988	45.32
Total votes		209,611	100.00
Turnout			
Republican hold			

=== District 28 ===
California's 28th congressional district election, 1976
Party	Candidate	Votes	%
Democratic	Yvonne Brathwaite Burke (inc.)	114,612	80.20
Republican	Edward S. Skinner	28,303	19.80
Total votes		142,915	100.00
Turnout			
Democratic hold			

=== District 29 ===
California's 29th congressional district election, 1976
Party	Candidate	Votes	%
Democratic	Augustus F. Hawkins (incumbent)	82,515	85.42
Republican	Michael D. Germonprez	10,852	11.23
Independent	Sheila Leburg	3,235	3.35
Total votes		96,602	100.00
Turnout			
Democratic hold			

=== District 30 ===
California's 30th congressional district election, 1976
Party	Candidate	Votes	%
Democratic	George E. Danielson (incumbent)	82,767	74.38
Republican	Harry Couch	28,503	25.62
Total votes		111,270	100.00
Turnout			
Democratic hold			

=== District 31 ===
California's 31st congressional district election, 1976
Party	Candidate	Votes	%
Democratic	Charles H. Wilson (incumbent)	83,155	100.00
Turnout			
Democratic hold			

=== District 32 ===
California's 32nd congressional district election, 1976
Party	Candidate	Votes	%
Democratic	Glenn M. Anderson (incumbent)	92,034	72.22
Republican	Clifford O. Young	35,394	27.78
Total votes		127,428	100.00
Turnout			
Democratic hold			

=== District 33 ===
California's 33rd congressional district election, 1976
Party	Candidate	Votes	%
Republican	Del M. Clawson (incumbent)	95,398	55.08
Democratic	Ted Snyder	77,807	44.92
Total votes		173,205	100.00
Turnout			
Republican hold			

=== District 34 ===
California's 34th congressional district election, 1976
Party	Candidate	Votes	%
Democratic	Mark W. Hannaford (incumbent)	100,988	50.71
Republican	Dan Lungren	98,147	49.29
Total votes		199,135	100.00
Turnout			
Democratic hold			

=== District 35 ===
California's 35th congressional district election, 1976
Party	Candidate	Votes	%
Democratic	Jim Lloyd (incumbent)	87,472	53.26
Republican	Louis Brutocao	76,765	46.74
Total votes		164,237	100.00
Turnout			
Democratic hold			

=== District 36 ===
California's 36th congressional district election, 1976
Party	Candidate	Votes	%
Democratic	George Brown, Jr. (incumbent)	90,830	61.56
Republican	Grant Carner	49,368	33.46
American Independent	William E. Pasley	7,358	4.99
Total votes		147,556	100.00
Turnout			
Democratic hold			

=== District 37 ===
California's 37th congressional district election, 1976
Party	Candidate	Votes	%
Republican	Shirley Neil Pettis (incumbent)	133,634	71.08
Democratic	Douglas C. Nilson Jr.	49,021	26.07
American Independent	Bernard Wahl	5,352	2.85
Total votes		188,007	100.00
Turnout			
Republican hold			

=== District 38 ===
California's 38th congressional district election, 1976
Party	Candidate	Votes	%
Democratic	Jerry M. Patterson (incumbent)	103,317	63.62
Republican	James "Jim" Combs	59,092	36.38
Total votes		162,409	100.00
Turnout			
Democratic hold			

=== District 39 ===
California's 39th congressional district election, 1976
Party	Candidate	Votes	%
Republican	Charles E. Wiggins (incumbent)	122,657	58.57
Democratic	William E. "Bill" Farris	86,745	41.43
Total votes		209,402	100.00
Turnout			
Republican hold			

=== District 40 ===
California's 40th congressional district election, 1976
Party	Candidate	Votes	%
Republican	Robert Badham	148,512	59.25
Democratic	Vivian Hall	102,132	40.75
Total votes		250,644	100.00
Turnout			
Republican hold			

=== District 41 ===
California's 41st congressional district election, 1976
Party	Candidate	Votes	%
Republican	Bob Wilson (incumbent)	128,784	57.65
Democratic	King Golden, Jr.	94,590	42.35
Total votes		223,374	100.00
Turnout			
Republican hold			

=== District 42 ===
California's 42nd congressional district election, 1976
Party	Candidate	Votes	%
Democratic	Lionel Van Deerlin (incumbent)	103,062	75.99
Republican	Wes Marden	32,565	24.01
Total votes		135,627	100.00
Turnout			
Democratic hold			

=== District 43 ===
California's 43rd congressional district election, 1976
Party	Candidate	Votes	%
Republican	Clair Burgener (incumbent)	173,576	65.00
Democratic	Pat Kelly	93,475	35.00
Total votes		267,051	100.00
Turnout			
Republican hold			

== See also ==
- 95th United States Congress
- Political party strength in California
- Political party strength in U.S. states
- 1976 United States House of Representatives elections
