= Pete Aguilar =

American politician (born 1979)

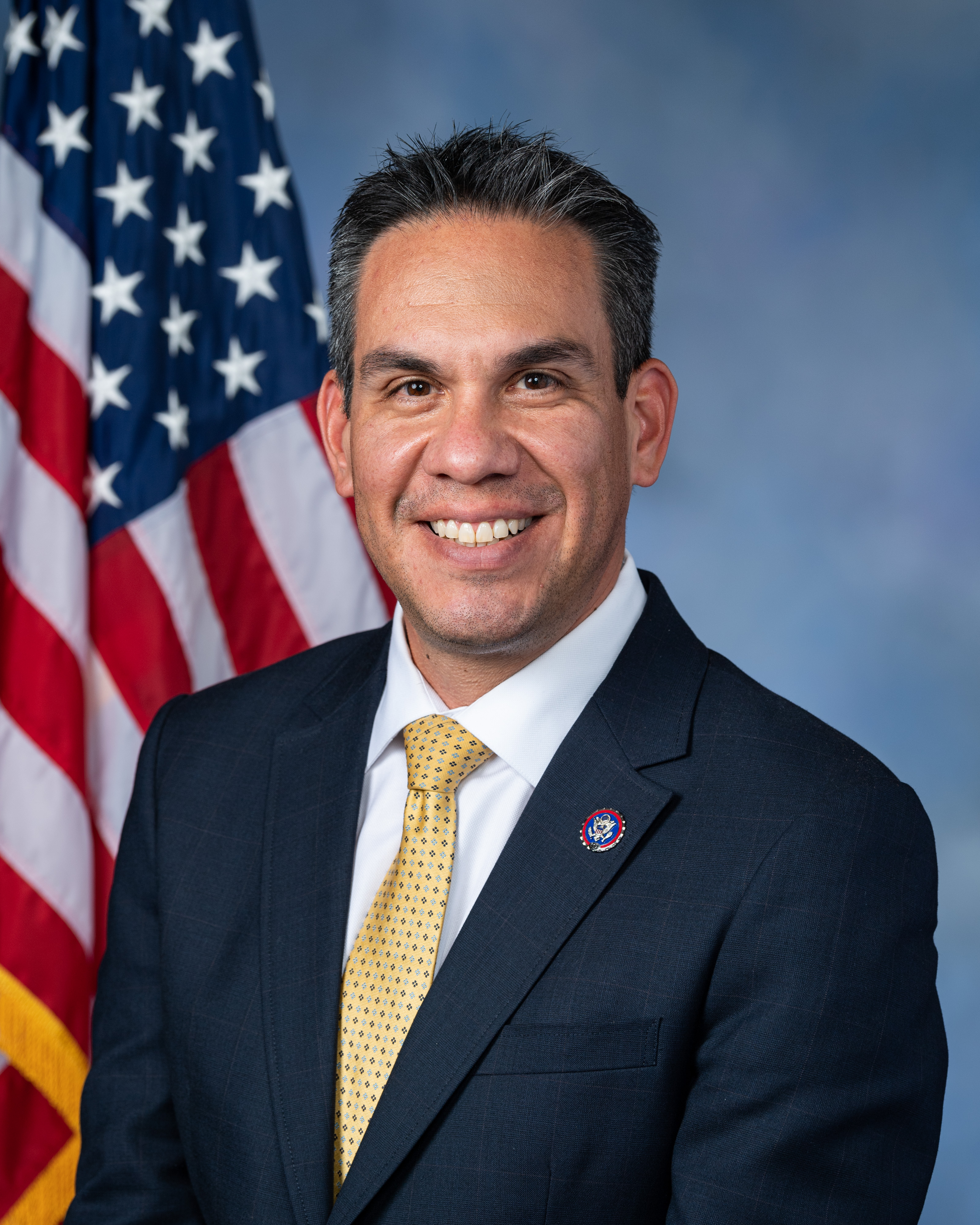
- Official portrait, 2021

House Majority Whip-designate
- Assuming office January 3, 2027
- Succeeding: Tom Emmer

Chair of the House Democratic Caucus
- Incumbent
- Assumed office January 3, 2023
- Leader: Hakeem Jeffries
- Preceded by: Hakeem Jeffries

Vice Chair of the House Democratic Caucus
- In office January 3, 2021 – January 3, 2023
- Leader: Nancy Pelosi
- Preceded by: Katherine Clark
- Succeeded by: Ted Lieu

Member of the U.S. House of Representatives from California
- Incumbent
- Assumed office January 3, 2015
- Preceded by: Gary Miller
- Constituency: 31st district (2015–2023); 33rd district (2023–present)

Mayor of Redlands
- In office December 7, 2010 – December 2, 2014
- Preceded by: Pat Gilbreath
- Succeeded by: Paul Foster

Personal details
- Born: Peter Rey Aguilar; June 19, 1979 (age 47) Fontana, California, U.S.
- Party: Democratic
- Spouse: Alisha Aguilar
- Children: 2
- Education: University of Redlands (BS)
- Website: House website Campaign website
- Aguilar's voice Aguilar on how the American Rescue Plan Act of 2021 will benefit his district. Recorded March 9, 2021

Peter Rey Aguilar (/ˈæɡjəlɑːr/ AG-yə-lar; born June 19, 1979) is an American politician who has been chair of the House Democratic Caucus since 2023. He has been the U.S. representative for California's 33rd congressional district (renumbered from the 31st after the 2020 redistricting cycle) since 2015. He served as mayor of Redlands, California, from 2010 to 2014, and as the president of the Inland Empire Division of the League of California Cities. Aguilar served on the Redlands City Council from 2006 until his election to Congress.

Aguilar chairs the House Democratic Caucus and is the highest-ranking Latino in Congress.

== Early life and education ==
Aguilar was born in Fontana, California, and grew up in a working-class family in San Bernardino, California. He is of Mexican descent. He graduated from the University of Redlands, where he studied government and business administration.

== Career ==
Aguilar began his career in public service in 2001 when then-California governor Gray Davis appointed him deputy director of the Inland Empire Regional Office of the governor, eventually becoming the Interim Director. In 2006, Aguilar became the youngest member of the Redlands City Council in the city's history when five council members, Democrat and Republican, picked him out of 11 candidates to fill an open seat. He was elected a year later. His fellow council members appointed him mayor in 2010 and again in 2012. As mayor, Aguilar was regarded for his professionalism, leadership during difficult financial times, balancing the city budget while building financial reserves, road improvements, government transparency, and fair treatment of municipal employees. Aguilar served as mayor and councilman until December 2014.

== U.S. House of Representatives ==
=== Elections ===
California's 31st congressional district became more favorable to the Democratic Party as a result of redistricting following the 2010 census. The Cook Partisan Voting Index rates the district D+5. In January 2012, Aguilar announced he would run for the seat held by incumbent Republican Gary Miller. Although the top Democratic vote-getter, with 22.6% of the vote, he finished behind Miller and Robert Dutton, the California State Senate Republican Leader. Because of California's open primary, both Republicans advanced to the November general election. In March 2013, Aguilar announced he would run again. In the June 2014 primary, he finished second, qualifying for the November 2014 general election, where he defeated Republican Paul Chabot with 51.4% of the vote. Aguilar defeated Chabot again in the 2016 election with 56.1% of the vote.

In the 2018 primary, Aguilar faced Kaiser Ahmed and Sean Flynn, a Republican economist and aikido artist. Aguilar received 45.96% of the vote to Flynn's 45.45% and Ahmed's 8.59%. In the 2018 general election, Aguilar won 58.7% of the vote to Flynn's 41.3%.

Aguilar won his 2020 election cycle with 61% of the vote, defeating Republican Agnes Gibboney. Aguilar was elected Vice chair of the House Democratic Caucus.

Redistricting from the 2020 US census, placed Aguilar in the new 33rd CA house district. He defeated Republican John Mark Porter and won re-election during the 2022 election cycle. He was also elected as House Democratic Caucus Chairman, becoming the highest ranking Latino-American in congress, in congressional history.

Aguilar was re-elected in the 2024 election cycle. He defeated Republican Tom Hermon, a local real estate investor with 57.4% of the local vote. He is currently serving his 6th term in Congress. In the November 3rd, 2026 general election, Aguilar will be running for re-election representing California’s 33rd Congressional District.

=== Legislation ===
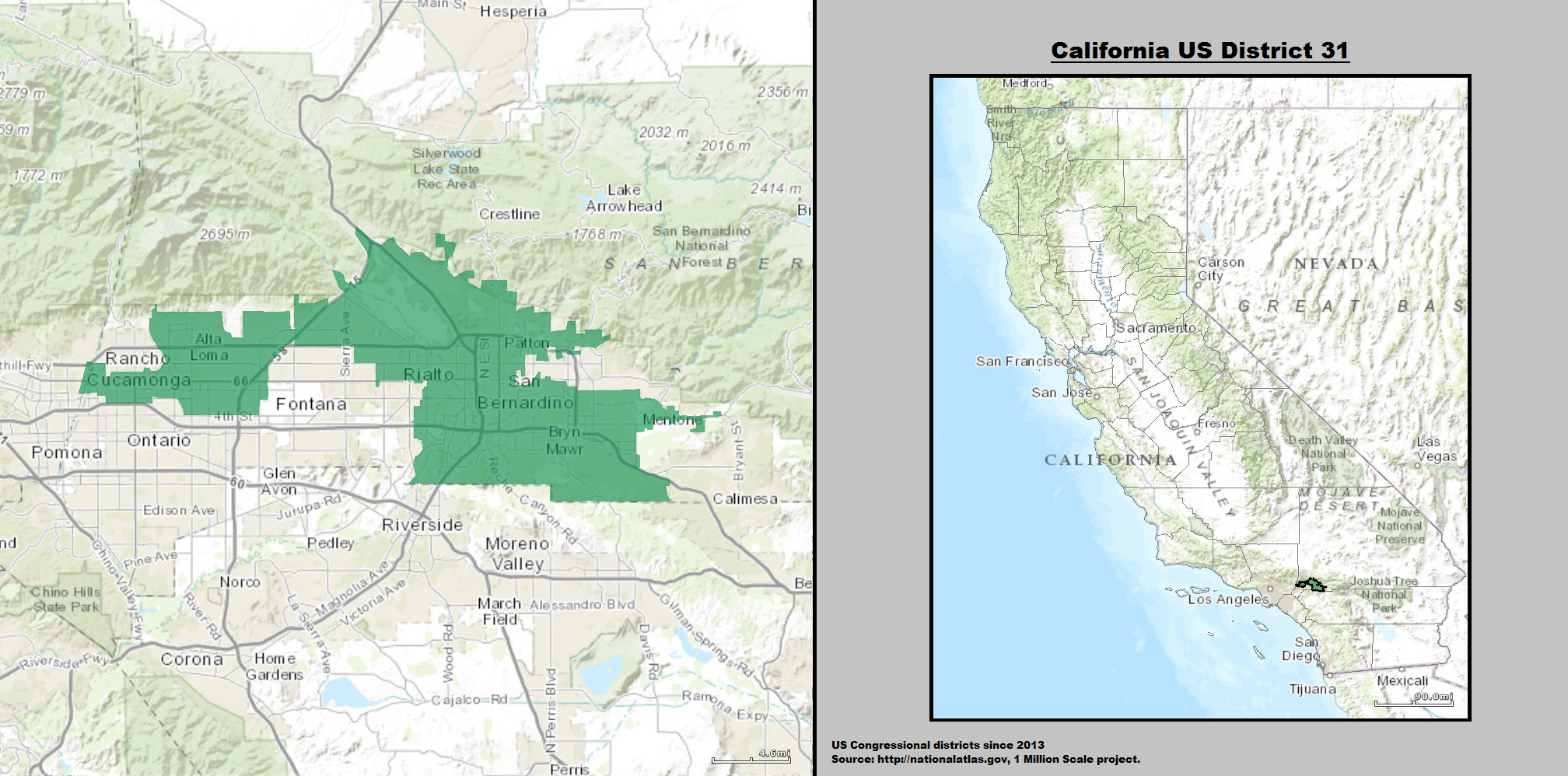
California's 31st congressional district, which Aguilar represented from 2015 through 2022 before redistricting

Aguilar's time in Congress has focused on immigration, job creation, trade practices, gun control, national security, LGBT issues, veteran affairs, drug prevention, student loan debt, and environmental protection. Aguilar has supported legislation to attract individuals in the cybersecurity field to join the military; prevent discrimination against LGBT people by government contractors; provide funding for homeless veterans; and provide funding for research into opioid addiction. He has introduced the Grace Period Alleviation (GPA) Act, which would give college graduates an optional grace period before beginning to repay certain types of loans. With Senator Dianne Feinstein and Representative Paul Cook, Aguilar introduced legislation to protect the habitat along the Santa Ana River. He has vowed to fight the repeal of the Affordable Care Act and to protect women's reproductive rights. In addition, he has worked closely with law enforcement and local, state and federal officials and agencies to help communities recover costs incurred from the emergency response to the 2015 San Bernardino attack, which took place in Aguilar's district, and helped secure additional funding for survivors of the attack.

Immigration

During the Obama administration, Aguilar supported expanding the Deferred Action for Childhood Arrivals (DACA) program for undocumented children and creating the Deferred Action for Parents of Americans and Lawful Permanent Residents (DAPA) program. He introduced the Academic Success Centers and Education Networks for Dreamers (ASCEND) Act, which would establish grants for college and university programs and services to benefit undocumented students. Aguilar voted in favor of legislation that would effectively halt the resettlement of refugees from Syria and Iraq to the U.S., citing national security concerns, but subsequently criticized President Donald Trump's Executive Order as "xenophobic" and said it sent a message of "hate and bigotry to the rest of the world." Aguilar criticized Trump and his staff for citing the 2015 San Bernardino attack in defending the executive order. In 2018, with Representative Will Hurd, Aguilar authored legislation that would provide a path to citizenship for DACA recipients and address border protection concerns.

Job creation

Aguilar released a job-creation initiative for his district that includes cutting taxes on small businesses, investing in infrastructure, expanding job-training programs, expanding Pell Grants, increasing the minimum wage, and equal pay for women. He has introduced a number of bills focusing on small businesses, including legislation to provide tax credits to small businesses for on-the-job training expenses, tax credits for small business for full-time newly hired employees, legislation to make it easier for small businesses to repay loans, and legislation making it easier for small businesses to advertise job openings. Aguilar annually hosts a jobs fair that connects job-seekers with employers in his district. In April 2017, he started a quarterly "Job For a Day" tour where he works throughout the Inland Empire doing jobs such as train conducting for Metrolink, sorting Goodwill donations, and bagging groceries at local markets. The tour's goal is to interact with community members directly and learn about local businesses' daily operations.

In 2017, Aguilar introduced a bill that would provide active-duty service members and reservists access to training for commercial drivers’ licenses granted by the FAST Act. He authored the Active Duty Voluntary Acquisition of Necessary Credentials for Employment (ADVANCE) Act and the OPPORTUNITY (Offering Promising Persons Occupations Relevant To Upholding National Interests For Years) Act, both of which Trump signed into law in 2018. The latter bill connects students of color with the Department of Defense Cyber Scholarship program.

Trade policy

Aguilar introduced the Displaced Jobs Relief Act, which increases authorization of funds for the Trade Adjustment Assistance for Firms program (TAA-F) to help businesses that have been negatively affected by trade. He has urged the United States International Trade Commission to find that imported steel subsidized by Korea, Mexico and Turkey creates unfair competition and hurts steel manufacturers in his district.

Gun control

Aguilar has advocated for reforms to curb gun violence by closing loopholes that terrorists have used to obtain guns and banning assault weapons. After the 2016 Orlando nightclub shooting, Aguilar participated in the 2016 United States House of Representatives sit-in to show support for gun control legislation.

=== Investigation into the January 6 attack on the Capitol ===
At the start of the 117th Congress, Aguilar was in the House Well, at the US Capitol building during the January 6 United States Capitol attack. On July 1, 2021, Speaker Pelosi appointed eight House members, including Aguilar, to the U.S. House Select Committee investigating the attack. After the announcement, Aguilar said of the committee and its investigation: "We owe them—and we owe the American people—a fair, thorough and evidence-based investigation into what happened that day so that we can ensure it never happens again."

On June 16, 2022, Aguilar and John Wood, an investigative counsel for the Select Committee, led the committee's third televised hearing, focusing on Trump's efforts to pressuring Mike Pence into decertifying the 2020 presidential election. The witnesses were Greg Jacob, Pence's counsel, who told Pence he did not have the authority to decertify the election results, and J. Michael Luttig, a retired conservative judge on the United States Court of Appeals for the Fourth Circuit, who called Donald Trump and his allies and supporters "a clear and present danger to American democracy."

=== Committee assignments ===
For the 118th Congress and 119th Congress:

- Committee on Appropriations
  - Subcommittee on Defense
  - Subcommittee on Transportation, Housing and Urban Development, and Related Agencies

=== Caucus memberships ===
- Chair, House Democratic Caucus
- Congressional Hispanic Caucus
- Pro-Choice Caucus
- Congressional Equality Caucus
- Latino-Jewish Caucus
- Diabetes Caucus
- Work for Warriors Caucus
- Joint Strike Fighter Caucus
- Veterans Jobs Caucus
- Former Mayors Caucus
- Wine Caucus
- Native American Caucus
- Steel Caucus
- Hunger Caucus
- New Democrat Coalition
- Congressional Asian Pacific American Caucus
- Climate Solutions Caucus
- Future Forum

Aguilar announced his candidacy for vice chair of the Democratic Caucus in September 2018, but lost to Katherine Clark by a vote of 144–90. By a vote of 148–82, he defeated Robin Kelly for the no. 6 spot in the House Democratic Caucus. The position became vacant after Clark decided to run for Assistant Speaker in the House Democratic Caucus. Aguilar then became vice chair in the 117th Congress and voted in as chair in the 118th Congress.

=== Campaign finance ===
Aguilar's top contributors throughout his career have been JStreet PAC, League of Conservation Voters, Credit Union National Association, Matich Corporation, and New World Medical. Since 2011, he has not contributed personally to his own campaign, and relies mostly on individual contributions from community members. He has obtained nearly $5.3 million in contributions from individuals (63.86% of total donations). Top donations are generally from Democrats, but also include lawyers and law firms, Leadership PACs, and labor unions. His total career campaign donations are $8.2 million.

== Political positions ==
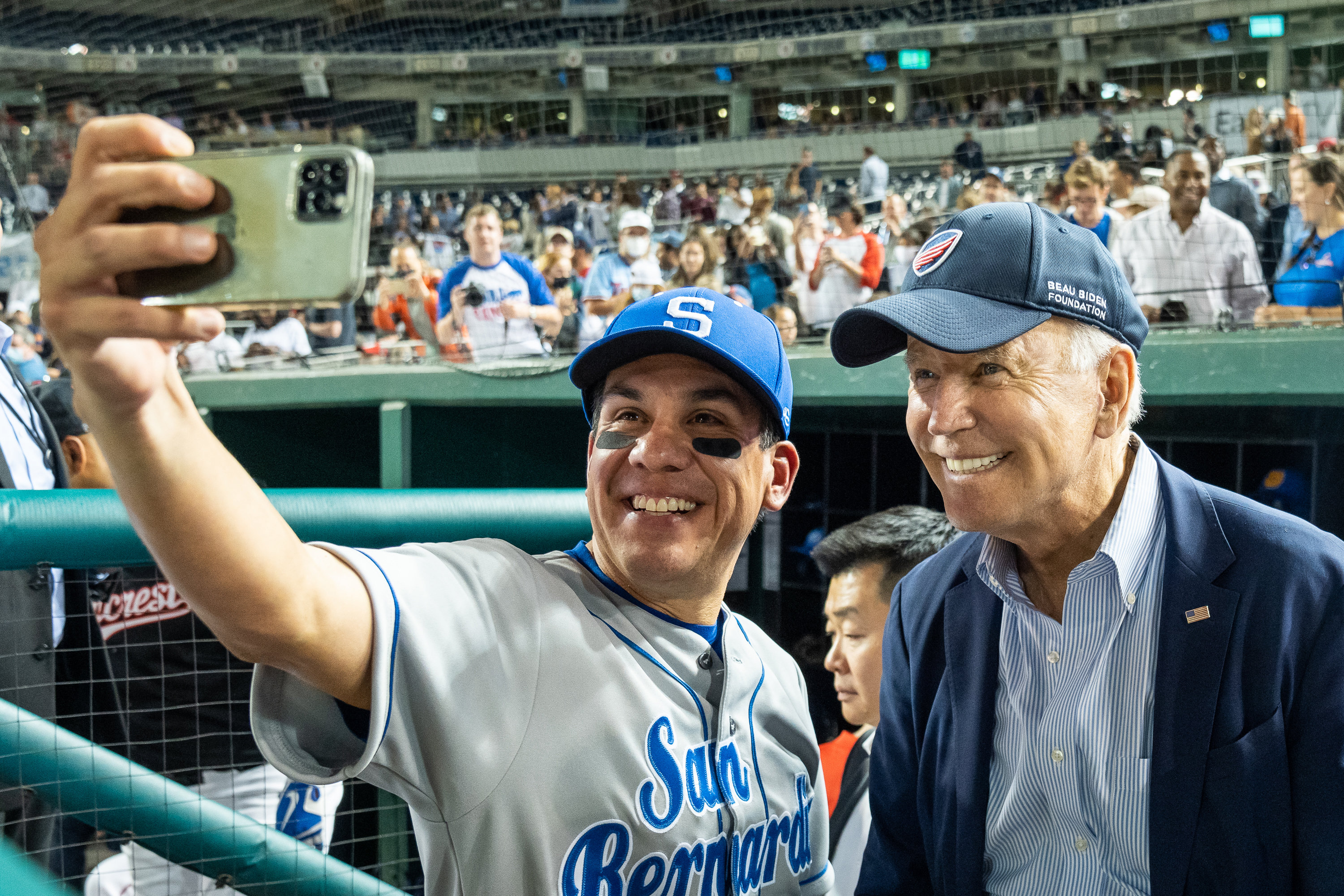
Aguilar and President Joe Biden

=== Abortion ===
Aguilar opposed the overturning of Roe v. Wade, calling it a "devastating decision".

=== Big Tech ===
In 2022, Aguilar was one of 16 Democrats to vote against the Merger Filing Fee Modernization Act of 2022, an antitrust package that would crack down on corporations' anti-competitive behavior.

=== Israel ===
Aguilar voted to provide Israel with support following the 2023 Hamas attack on Israel.

=== Transgender Issues ===
In January 2025, Aguilar voted against the Protection of Women and Girls in Sports Act, which bars the application of Title IX protections to people born male who transitioned to female. Aguilar argued that only "10 athletes out of 500,000 athletes" competing in college sports are transgender, saying "the House Republican conference would choose to have this conversation rather than something that is more expansive that truly helps lower cost or makes people’s lives better."

== Electoral history ==
• 2026 • 2024 • 2022 • 2020 • 2018 • 2016 • 2014 • 2012

=== 2026 ===
California's 33rd congressional district election, 2026
Primary election
Party	Candidate	Votes	%
Democratic	Pete Aguilar (incumbent)	64,068	53.5
Republican	Stephanie Vargas	20,952	17.5
Republican	Tom Herman	13,623	11.4
Democratic	Antonis Christodoulou	9,013	7.5
Republican	Eugene Weems	5,491	4.6
Republican	Ernest "Ernie" Richter	5,368	4.5
No party preference	Ling Ling Shi	1,152	1.0
Total votes		119,667	100

=== 2024 ===
California's 33rd congressional district election, 2024
Primary election
Party	Candidate	Votes	%
Democratic	Pete Aguilar (incumbent)	45,065	57.1
Republican	Tom Herman	33,815	42.8
Republican	John Mark Porter (write-in)	104	0.1
Republican	Ernest Richter (write-in)	3	0.0
Total votes		78,987	100.0
General election
Democratic	Pete Aguilar (incumbent)	81,595	57.4
Republican	Tom Herman	60,495	42.6
Total votes		142,090	100

=== 2022 ===
California's 33rd congressional district election, 2022
Primary election
Party	Candidate	Votes	%
Democratic	Pete Aguilar (incumbent)	41,046	59.8
Republican	John Mark Porter	12,096	17.6
Republican	Rex Gutierrez	10,587	15.4
Republican	Ernest Richter	4,878	7.1
Total votes		68,607	100.0
General election
Democratic	Pete Aguilar (incumbent)	76,588	57.7
Republican	John Mark Porter	56,119	42.3
Total votes		132,707	100.0
Democratic hold			

=== 2020 ===
California's 31st congressional district election, 2020
Primary election
Party	Candidate	Votes	%
Democratic	Pete Aguilar (incumbent)	81,994	62.1
Republican	Agnes Gibboney	49,889	37.8
No party preference	Eugene Weems (write-in)	51	0.0
Total votes		131,934	100.0
General election
Democratic	Pete Aguilar (incumbent)	175,315	61.3
Republican	Agnes Gibboney	110,735	38.7
Total votes		286,050	100.0
Democratic hold			

=== 2018 ===
California's 31st congressional district election, 2018
Primary election
Party	Candidate	Votes	%
Democratic	Pete Aguilar (incumbent)	41,337	45.9
Republican	Sean Flynn	40,622	45.1
Democratic	Kaisar Ahmed	8,108	9.0
Total votes		90,067	100.0
General election
Democratic	Pete Aguilar (incumbent)	110,143	58.7
Republican	Sean Flynn	77,352	41.3
Total votes		187,495	100.0
Democratic hold			

=== 2016 ===
California's 31st congressional district election, 2016
Primary election
Party	Candidate	Votes	%
Democratic	Pete Aguilar (incumbent)	48,518	43.1
Republican	Paul Chabot	25,534	22.7
Republican	Joe Baca	14,020	12.4
Democratic	Kaisar Ahmed	12,418	11.0
Republican	Sean Flynn	12,130	10.8
Total votes		112,620	100.0
General election
Democratic	Pete Aguilar (incumbent)	121,070	56.1
Republican	Paul Chabot	94,866	43.9
Total votes		215,936	100.0
Democratic hold			

=== 2014 ===
California's 31st congressional district election, 2014
Primary election
Party	Candidate	Votes	%
Republican	Paul Chabot	14,163	26.6
Democratic	Pete Aguilar	9,242	17.4
Republican	Lesli Gooch	9,033	17.0
Democratic	Eloise Reyes	8,461	15.9
Democratic	Joe Baca	5,954	11.2
Democratic	Danny Tillman	4,659	8.7
Republican	Ryan Downing	1,737	3.3
Total votes		53,249	100.0
General election
Democratic	Pete Aguilar	51,622	51.7
Republican	Paul Chabot	48,162	48.3
Total votes		99,784	100.0
Democratic gain from Republican			

=== 2012 ===
California's 31st congressional district election, 2012
Primary election
Party	Candidate	Votes	%
Republican	Gary Miller (incumbent)	16,708	26.7
Republican	Robert Dutton	15,557	24.8
Democratic	Pete Aguilar	14,181	22.6
Democratic	Justin Kim	8,487	13.5
Democratic	Renea Wickman	4,188	6.7
Democratic	Rita Ramirez-Dean	3,546	5.7
Total votes		62,667	100.0

== Personal life ==
Aguilar has lived in Redlands, California, since 1997. He and his wife, Alisha, have two sons: Evan and Palmer.

== See also ==
- List of Hispanic and Latino Americans in the United States Congress

U.S. House of Representatives
Preceded by Gary Miller	Member of the U.S. House of Representatives from California's 31st congressional district 2015–2023	Succeeded by Grace Napolitano
Preceded by Ted Lieu	Member of the U.S. House of Representatives from California's 33rd congressional district 2023–present	Incumbent
Preceded by Tom Emmer	House Majority Whip; Taking office 2027	Designate
Party political offices
Preceded by Katherine Clark	Vice Chair of the House Democratic Caucus; 2021–2023	Succeeded by Ted Lieu
Preceded by Hakeem Jeffries	Chair of the House Democratic Caucus; 2023–present	Incumbent
U.S. order of precedence (ceremonial)
Preceded by Ed Case	United States representatives by seniority 125th	Succeeded by Rick Allen
