= Jerry Pettis =

American politician

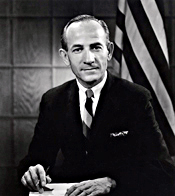

Member of the U.S. House of Representatives from California
- In office January 3, 1967 – February 14, 1975
- Preceded by: Kenneth W. Dyal
- Succeeded by: Shirley Neil Pettis
- Constituency: 33rd district 1967–1975); 37th district (1975)

Personal details
- Born: Jerry Lyle Pettis; July 18, 1916 Phoenix, Arizona, U.S.
- Died: February 14, 1975 (aged 58) Riverside County, California, U.S.
- Resting place: Montecito Memorial Park, Colton, California, U.S.
- Party: Republican
- Spouse: Shirley Neil Pettis
- Education: Pacific Union College
- Profession: Rancher, teacher, aviator, religious leader, businessman

Military service
- Branch/service: U.S. Army Air Forces
- Battles/wars: World War II

Jerry Lyle Pettis (July 18, 1916 – February 14, 1975) was an American politician and a four-term congressman from California from 1967 to 1975. He was also a rancher, teacher, aviator, religious leader, and businessman. Pettis was the first Seventh Day Adventist elected to Congress.

== Political career ==
Pettis first ran as a Republican for the U.S. House of Representatives in 1964, losing by 48%-51% to Democrat Kenneth W. Dyal. In 1966, he defeated Dyal in a rematch, 53%-47%, and was re-elected in 1968, 1970, 1972 and 1974. Pettis represented California's 33rd Congressional District until January 1975 and its 37th Congressional District thereafter.

== Background and personal life ==
Educated in Arizona and California, he graduated from Pacific Union College in Angwin, California in 1938. He did graduate work at the University of Southern California and the University of Denver in 1939-1941 before becoming a businessman. He served in the United States Army Air Forces during World War II and was a pilot for United Airlines.

He was a Seventh-day Adventist.

== Death and legacy ==
Pettis was killed on February 14, 1975, when the Beechcraft Model V35B Bonanza he was piloting crashed in the San Gorgonio Pass in Riverside County, California, near Cherry Valley, after he encountered adverse weather conditions. He is buried at Montecito Memorial Park in Colton, California.

Pettis's wife, Shirley Neil Pettis, replaced him in the House when she won a special election on April 29, 1975.

The Jerry Pettis Memorial Veterans Administration Hospital in Loma Linda, California, was so named in his honor. His congressional papers are located in the Archives & Special Collections at Loma Linda University.

During the 1970s, the Jerry L. Pettis Memorial Scholarship was established and is awarded by the American Medical Association Foundation to "students pursuing careers in science communications".

== Electoral history ==
1964 United States House of Representatives elections in California
Party	Candidate	Votes	%
Democratic	Kenneth W. Dyal	109,047	51.7
Republican	Jerry Pettis	101,742	48.3
Total votes		210,789	100.0
Democratic hold			

1966 United States House of Representatives elections in California
Party	Candidate	Votes	%
Republican	Jerry Pettis	102,401	53.5
Democratic	Kenneth W. Dyal (incumbent)	89,071	46.5
Total votes		191,472	100.0
Republican gain from Democratic			

1968 United States House of Representatives elections in California
Party	Candidate	Votes	%
Republican	Jerry Pettis (Incumbent)	123,426	66.3
Democratic	Al C. Bellard	59,619	32.0
American Independent	Earl D. Wallen	3,171	1.7
Total votes		186,216	100.0
Republican hold			

1970 United States House of Representatives elections in California
Party	Candidate	Votes	%
Republican	Jerry Pettis (Incumbent)	116,093	72.2
Democratic	Chester M. Wright	44,764	27.8
Total votes		160,857	100.0
Republican hold			

1972 United States House of Representatives elections in California
Party	Candidate	Votes	%
Republican	Jerry Pettis (Incumbent)	140,304	75.1
Democratic	Ken Thompson	46,626	24.9
Total votes		186,930	100.0
Republican hold			

1974 United States House of Representatives elections in California
Party	Candidate	Votes	%
Republican	Jerry Pettis (Incumbent)	88,548	63.2
Democratic	Bobby Ray Vincent	46,449	32.9
American Independent	John H. Ortman	5,522	3.9
Total votes		140,519	100.0
Republican hold			

== See also ==
- List of members of the United States Congress who died in office (1950–1999)

U.S. House of Representatives
Preceded by Kenneth W. Dyal	Member of the U.S. House of Representatives from California's 33rd congressional district January 3, 1967 – January 3, 1975	Succeeded by Del M. Clawson
Preceded by Yvonne B. Burke	Member of the U.S. House of Representatives from California's 37th congressional district January 3, 1975 – February 14, 1975	Succeeded by Shirley Neil Pettis
