= 1958 United States House of Representatives elections in California =

- November 4, 1958

All 30 California seats to the United States House of Representatives
	Majority party	Minority party
Party	Democratic	Republican
Last election	13	17
Seats won	16	14
Seat change	▲3	▼3
Popular vote	2,971,861	1,982,276
Percentage	59.99%	40.01%
- Democratic gain Democratic hold Republican hold

The United States House of Representatives elections in California, 1958 was an election for California's delegation to the United States House of Representatives, which occurred as part of the general election of the House of Representatives on November 4, 1958. Democrats picked up three seats, taking a majority of the delegation, which they would keep ever since except for a brief tie with the Republicans in the 104th Congress.

== Overview ==
United States House of Representatives elections in California, 1958
Party	Votes	%	Before	After	+/–
Democratic	2,971,861	60.0%	13	16	+3
Republican	1,982,276	40.0%	17	14	-3
Totals	4,954,137	100.0%	30	30	—

== Results ==
Final results from the Clerk of the House of Representatives:

=== District 1 ===
California's 1st congressional district election, 1958
Party	Candidate	Votes	%
Democratic	Clement Woodnutt Miller	102,096	54.9
Republican	Frederick G. Dupuis	84,807	45.1
Total votes		185,903	100.0
Turnout			
Democratic gain from Republican			

=== District 2 ===
California's 2nd congressional district election, 1958
Party	Candidate	Votes	%
Democratic	Harold T. Johnson	90,850	61
Republican	Curtis W. Tarr	58,199	39
Total votes		149,049	100
Turnout			
Democratic hold			

=== District 3 ===
California's 3rd congressional district election, 1958
Party	Candidate	Votes	%
Democratic	John E. Moss (incumbent)	169,727	100.0
Turnout			
Democratic hold			

=== District 4 ===
California's 4th congressional district election, 1958
Party	Candidate	Votes	%
Republican	William S. Mailliard (incumbent)	98,574	63.9
Democratic	George D. Collins, Jr.	65,798	36.1
Total votes		164,372	100.0
Turnout			
Republican hold			

=== District 5 ===
California's 5th congressional district election, 1958
Party	Candidate	Votes	%
Democratic	John F. Shelley (incumbent)	99,171	100.0
Turnout			
Democratic hold			

=== District 6 ===
California's 6th congressional district election, 1958
Party	Candidate	Votes	%
Republican	John F. Baldwin, Jr. (incumbent)	92,669	51
Democratic	Howard H. Jewel	89,192	49
Total votes		181,861	100
Turnout			
Republican hold			

=== District 7 ===
California's 7th congressional district election, 1958
Party	Candidate	Votes	%
Democratic	Jeffery Cohelan	65,699	50.9
Republican	John J. Allen, Jr. (incumbent)	63,270	49.1
Total votes		128,969	100.0
Turnout			
Democratic gain from Republican			

=== District 8 ===
California's 8th congressional district election, 1958
Party	Candidate	Votes	%
Democratic	George P. Miller (incumbent)	181,437	100.0
Turnout			
Democratic hold			

=== District 9 ===
California's 9th congressional district election, 1958
Party	Candidate	Votes	%
Republican	J. Arthur Younger (incumbent)	90,735	58.8
Democratic	Elma D. Oddstad	63,597	41.2
Total votes		154,332	100.0
Turnout			
Republican hold			

=== District 10 ===
California's 10th congressional district election, 1958
Party	Candidate	Votes	%
Republican	Charles S. Gubser (incumbent)	118,715	54.6
Democratic	Russell B. Bryan	98,894	45.4
Total votes		217,609	100.0
Turnout			
Republican hold			

=== District 11 ===
California's 11th congressional district election, 1958
Party	Candidate	Votes	%
Democratic	John J. McFall (incumbent)	86,924	69.3
Republican	Frederick S. Van Dyke	38,427	30.7
Total votes		125,351	100.0
Turnout			
Democratic hold			

=== District 12 ===
California's 12th congressional district election, 1958
Party	Candidate	Votes	%
Democratic	Bernice F. Sisk (incumbent)	112,702	81.1
Republican	Daniel K. Halpin	26,228	18.9
Total votes		138,930	100
Turnout			
Democratic hold			

=== District 13 ===
California's 13th congressional district election, 1958
Party	Candidate	Votes	%
Republican	Charles M. Teague (incumbent)	98,381	57
Democratic	William Kirk Stewart	74,160	43
Total votes		172,541	100
Turnout			
Republican hold			

=== District 14 ===
California's 14th congressional district election, 1958
Party	Candidate	Votes	%
Democratic	Harlan Hagen (incumbent)	120,347	100.0
Turnout			
Democratic hold			

=== District 15 ===
California's 15th congressional district election, 1958
Party	Candidate	Votes	%
Republican	Gordon L. McDonough (incumbent)	77,267	52
Democratic	Emery S. Petty	71,192	48
Total votes		148,459	100
Turnout			
Republican hold			

=== District 16 ===
California's 16th congressional district election, 1958
Party	Candidate	Votes	%
Republican	Donald L. Jackson (incumbent)	70,724	57.8
Democratic	Melvin Lennard	51,616	42.2
Total votes		122,340	100.0
Turnout			
Republican hold			

=== District 17 ===
California's 17th congressional district election, 1958
Party	Candidate	Votes	%
Democratic	Cecil R. King (incumbent)	182,965	75.3
Republican	Charles A. Franklin	59,973	24.7
Total votes		242,938	100.0
Turnout			
Democratic hold			

=== District 18 ===
California's 18th congressional district election, 1958
Party	Candidate	Votes	%
Republican	Craig Hosmer (incumbent)	95,682	60
Democratic	Harry S. May	63,684	40
Total votes		159,366	100
Turnout			
Republican hold			

=== District 19 ===
California's 19th congressional district election, 1958
Party	Candidate	Votes	%
Democratic	Chet Holifield (incumbent)	131,421	75.3
Republican	Roy E. Reynolds	26,092	24.7
Total votes		157,513	100.0
Turnout			
Democratic hold			

=== District 20 ===
California's 20th congressional district election, 1958
Party	Candidate	Votes	%
Republican	H. Allen Smith (incumbent)	72,311	66
Democratic	Eugene Radding	37,331	34
Total votes		109,642	100.0
Turnout			
Republican hold			

=== District 21 ===
California's 21st congressional district election, 1958
Party	Candidate	Votes	%
Republican	Edgar W. Hiestand (incumbent)	127,238	51.9
Democratic	Mrs. Rudd Brown	118,141	48.1
Total votes		245,379	100.0
Turnout			
Democratic hold			

=== District 22 ===
California's 22nd congressional district election, 1958
Party	Candidate	Votes	%
Republican	Joseph F. Holt (incumbent)	87,785	55.4
Democratic	Irving Glasband	70,777	44.6
Total votes		158,562	100.0
Turnout			
Republican hold			

=== District 23 ===
California's 23rd congressional district election, 1958
Party	Candidate	Votes	%
Democratic	Clyde Doyle (incumbent)	140,817	100.0
Turnout			
Democratic hold			

=== District 24 ===
California's 24th congressional district election, 1958
Party	Candidate	Votes	%
Republican	Glenard P. Lipscomb (incumbent)	68,184	56.4
Democratic	William H. Ware, Jr.	52,804	43.6
Total votes		120,988	100.0
Turnout			
Republican hold			

=== District 25 ===
California's 25th congressional district election, 1958
Party	Candidate	Votes	%
Democratic	George A. Kasem	135,009	50.1
Republican	Prescott O. Lieberg	134,406	49.9
Total votes		269,415	100.0
Turnout			
Democratic gain from Republican			

=== District 26 ===
California's 26th congressional district election, 1958
Party	Candidate	Votes	%
Democratic	James Roosevelt (incumbent)	125,495	72.2
Republican	Crispus Wright	48,248	27.8
Total votes		173,743	100.0
Turnout			
Democratic hold			

=== District 27 ===
California's 27th congressional district election, 1958
Party	Candidate	Votes	%
Democratic	Harry R. Sheppard (incumbent)	105,062	72.3
Republican	Robert M. Castle	40,317	27.7
Total votes		145,379	100.0
Turnout			
Democratic hold			

=== District 28 ===
California's 28th congressional district election, 1958
Party	Candidate	Votes	%
Republican	James B. Utt (incumbent)	152,855	58.2
Democratic	T. R. Boyett	109,794	41.8
Total votes		162,649	100.0
Turnout			
Republican hold			

=== District 29 ===
California's 29th congressional district election, 1958
Party	Candidate	Votes	%
Democratic	Dalip Singh Saund (incumbent)	64,518	62.4
Republican	John Babbage	38,899	37.6
Total votes		103,417	100.0
Turnout			
Democratic hold			

=== District 30 ===
California's 30th congressional district election, 1958
Party	Candidate	Votes	%
Republican	Bob Wilson (incumbent)	112,290	52.7
Democratic	Lionel Van Deerlin	90,641	47.3
Total votes		202,931	100.0
Turnout			
Republican hold			

== See also ==
- 86th United States Congress
- Political party strength in California
- Political party strength in U.S. states
- 1958 United States House of Representatives elections
