= 1960 United States House of Representatives elections in California =

- November 8, 1960

All 30 California seats to the United States House of Representatives
	Majority party	Minority party
Party	Democratic	Republican
Last election	16	14
Seats won	16	14
Seat change	Steady	Steady
Popular vote	3,336,709	2,855,115
Percentage	53.89%	46.11%
- Democratic gain Republican gain Democratic hold Republican hold

The United States House of Representatives elections in California, 1960 was an election for California's delegation to the United States House of Representatives, which occurred as part of the general election of the House of Representatives on November 8, 1960. Democrats and Republicans each swapped a seat, leaving the balance at 16 Democrats and 14 Republicans.

== Overview ==
United States HoR elections in California, 1960
Party	Votes	%	Seats
Democratic	3,336,709	53.9%	16
Republican	2,855,115	46.1%	14
Totals	6,191,824	100.0%	30

== Results ==
Final results from the Clerk of the House of Representatives:

=== District 1 ===
California's 1st congressional district election, 1960
Party	Candidate	Votes	%
Democratic	Clement Woodnutt Miller (inc.)	115,829	51.6
Republican	Frederick G. Dupuis	108,505	48.4
Total votes		224,334	100.0
Turnout			
Democratic hold			

=== District 2 ===
California's 2nd congressional district election, 1960
Party	Candidate	Votes	%
Democratic	Harold T. Johnson (incumbent)	109,565	62.7
Republican	Fredric H. Nagel	65,198	37.3
Total votes		174,763	100.0
Turnout			
Democratic hold			

=== District 3 ===
California's 3rd congressional district election, 1960
Party	Candidate	Votes	%
Democratic	John E. Moss (incumbent)	200,439	100.0
Turnout			
Democratic hold			

=== District 4 ===
California's 4th congressional district election, 1960
Party	Candidate	Votes	%
Republican	William S. Mailliard (incumbent)	118,249	65.3
Democratic	Phillips S. Davies	62,814	34.7
Total votes		181,063	100.0
Turnout			
Republican hold			

=== District 5 ===
California's 5th congressional district election, 1960
Party	Candidate	Votes	%
Democratic	John F. Shelley (incumbent)	104,507	83.7
Republican	Vick Verreos	20,305	16.3
Total votes		124,812	100.0
Turnout			
Democratic hold			

=== District 6 ===
California's 6th congressional district election, 1960
Party	Candidate	Votes	%
Republican	John F. Baldwin, Jr. (incumbent)	128,418	58.7
Democratic	Douglas R. Page	90,260	41.3
Total votes		218,678	100.0
Turnout			
Republican hold			

=== District 7 ===
California's 7th congressional district election, 1960
Party	Candidate	Votes	%
Democratic	Jeffery Cohelan (incumbent)	79,776	57.1
Republican	Lewis F. Sherman	60,065	42.9
Total votes		139,841	100.0
Turnout			
Democratic hold			

=== District 8 ===
California's 8th congressional district election, 1960
Party	Candidate	Votes	%
Democratic	George P. Miller (incumbent)	152,476	62
Republican	Robert E. Hannon	93,403	38
Total votes		245,879	100
Turnout			
Democratic hold			

=== District 9 ===
California's 9th congressional district election, 1960
Party	Candidate	Votes	%
Republican	J. Arthur Younger (incumbent)	116,589	59.2
Democratic	John D. Kaster	80,227	40.8
Total votes		196,816	100.0
Turnout			
Republican hold			

=== District 10 ===
California's 10th congressional district election, 1960
Party	Candidate	Votes	%
Republican	Charles S. Gubser (incumbent)	170,063	58.9
Democratic	Russell B. Bryan	118,520	41.1
Total votes		288,583	100.0
Turnout			
Republican hold			

=== District 11 ===
California's 11th congressional district election, 1960
Party	Candidate	Votes	%
Democratic	John J. McFall (incumbent)	97,368	65.4
Republican	Clifford B. Bull	51,473	34.6
Total votes		148,841	100.0
Turnout			
Democratic hold			

=== District 12 ===
California's 12th congressional district election, 1960
Party	Candidate	Votes	%
Democratic	Bernice F. Sisk (incumbent)	141,974	100.0
Turnout			
Democratic hold			

=== District 13 ===
California's 13th congressional district election, 1960
Party	Candidate	Votes	%
Republican	Charles M. Teague (incumbent)	146,072	65
Democratic	L. Boyd Finch	78,597	35
Total votes		224,669	100
Turnout			
Republican hold			

=== District 14 ===
California's 14th congressional district election, 1960
Party	Candidate	Votes	%
Democratic	Harlan Hagen (incumbent)	97,026	56.5
Republican	G. Ray Arnett	74,800	43.5
Total votes		171,826	100.0
Turnout			
Democratic hold			

=== District 15 ===
California's 15th congressional district election, 1960
Party	Candidate	Votes	%
Republican	Gordon L. McDonough (incumbent)	89,234	51.3
Democratic	Emery S. Petty	84,650	48.7
Total votes		173,884	100.0
Turnout			
Republican hold			

=== District 16 ===
California's 16th congressional district election, 1960
Party	Candidate	Votes	%
Republican	Alphonzo E. Bell, Jr.	83,601	55.4
Democratic	Jerry Pacht	67,318	44.6
Total votes		150,919	100.0
Turnout			
Republican hold			

=== District 17 ===
California's 17th congressional district election, 1960
Party	Candidate	Votes	%
Democratic	Cecil R. King (incumbent)	206,620	67.7
Republican	Tom Coffee	98,510	32.3
Total votes		305,130	100.0
Turnout			
Democratic hold			

=== District 18 ===
California's 18th congressional district election, 1960
Party	Candidate	Votes	%
Republican	Craig Hosmer (incumbent)	129,851	70
Democratic	D. Patrick Ahern	55,735	30
Total votes		185,586	100
Turnout			
Republican hold			

=== District 19 ===
California's 19th congressional district election, 1960
Party	Candidate	Votes	%
Democratic	Chet Holifield (incumbent)	145,479	78.2
Republican	Gordon S. McWilliams	40,491	21.8
Total votes		185,970	100.0
Turnout			
Democratic hold			

=== District 20 ===
California's 20th congressional district election, 1960
Party	Candidate	Votes	%
Republican	H. Allen Smith (incumbent)	90,214	70.1
Democratic	Eugene Radding	38,497	29.9
Total votes		128,711	100.0
Turnout			
Republican hold			

=== District 21 ===
California's 21st congressional district election, 1960
Party	Candidate	Votes	%
Republican	Edgar W. Hiestand (incumbent)	179,376	58.4
Democratic	Mrs. Rudd Brown	127,591	41.6
Total votes		306,967	100.0
Turnout			
Democratic hold			

=== District 22 ===
California's 22nd congressional district election, 1960
Party	Candidate	Votes	%
Democratic	James C. Corman	104,919	51.1
Republican	Lemoine Blanchard	100,321	48.9
Total votes		205,240	100.0
Turnout			
Democratic gain from Republican			

=== District 23 ===
California's 23rd congressional district election, 1960
Party	Candidate	Votes	%
Democratic	Clyde Doyle (incumbent)	148,415	74.2
Republican	Emmett A. Schwartz	51,548	25.8
Total votes		199,963	100.0
Turnout			
Democratic hold			

=== District 24 ===
California's 24th congressional district election, 1960
Party	Candidate	Votes	%
Republican	Glenard P. Lipscomb (incumbent)	82,497	59.7
Democratic	Norman Hass	55,613	40.3
Total votes		138,110	100.0
Turnout			
Republican hold			

=== District 25 ===
California's 25th congressional district election, 1960
Party	Candidate	Votes	%
Republican	John H. Rousselot	182,545	53.6
Democratic	George A. Kasem (incumbent)	158,289	46.4
Total votes		340,834	100.0
Turnout			
Republican gain from Democratic			

=== District 26 ===
California's 26th congressional district election, 1960
Party	Candidate	Votes	%
Democratic	James Roosevelt (incumbent)	150,318	73.4
Republican	William E. McIntyre	54,540	26.6
Total votes		204,818	100.0
Turnout			
Democratic hold			

=== District 27 ===
California's 27th congressional district election, 1960
Party	Candidate	Votes	%
Democratic	Harry R. Sheppard (incumbent)	123,645	66.8
Republican	Robert M. Castle	61,484	33.2
Total votes		185,129	100.0
Turnout			
Democratic hold			

=== District 28 ===
California's 28th congressional district election, 1960
Party	Candidate	Votes	%
Republican	James B. Utt (incumbent)	241,765	60.9
Democratic	Max E. Woods	155,221	39.1
Total votes		396,986	100.0
Turnout			
Republican hold			

=== District 29 ===
California's 29th congressional district election, 1960
Party	Candidate	Votes	%
Democratic	Dalip Singh Saund (incumbent)	76,139	57.1
Republican	Charles H. Jameson	57,319	42.9
Total votes		133,458	100.0
Turnout			
Democratic hold			

=== District 30 ===
California's 30th congressional district election, 1960
Party	Candidate	Votes	%
Republican	Bob Wilson (incumbent)	158,679	59.3
Democratic	Walter Wencke	108,882	40.7
Total votes		267,561	100.0
Turnout			
Republican hold			

== See also ==
- 87th United States Congress
- Political party strength in California
- Political party strength in U.S. states
- 1960 United States House of Representatives elections
