= 1968 United States House of Representatives elections in California =

- November 5, 1968

All 38 California seats to the United States House of Representatives
	Majority party	Minority party
Party	Democratic	Republican
Last election	22	16
Seats won	22	16
Seat change	Steady	Steady
Popular vote	3,036,602	3,741,454
Percentage	44.13%	54.38%
- Results: Democratic hold Republican hold

The United States House of Representatives elections in California, 1968 was an election for California's delegation to the United States House of Representatives, which occurred as part of the general election of the House of Representatives on November 5, 1968. The delegation remained unchanged, at 22 Democrats and 16 Republicans.

== Overview ==
United States HoR elections in California, 1968
Party	Votes	%	Seats
Republican	3,741,454	54.38%	16
Democratic	3,036,602	44.13%	22
American Independent	55,920	0.81%	0
Peace and Freedom	46,294	0.67%	0
Totals	6,880,270	100.00%	38

== Results ==
Final results from the Clerk of the House of Representatives:

=== District 1 ===
California's 1st congressional district election, 1968
Party	Candidate	Votes	%
Republican	Don H. Clausen (incumbent)	132,433	75.10
Democratic	Donald W. Graham	37,650	21.35
Peace and Freedom	Adolph N. Hofmann	3,372	1.91
American Independent	Gladys O'Neil	2,882	1.63
Total votes		176,337	100.00
Turnout			
Republican hold			

=== District 2 ===
California's 2nd congressional district election, 1968
Party	Candidate	Votes	%
Democratic	Harold T. Johnson (incumbent)	127,880	60.77
Republican	Osmer E. Dunaway	78,986	37.53
American Independent	Paul J. Huft	3,577	1.70
Total votes		210,443	100.00
Turnout			
Democratic hold			

=== District 3 ===
California's 3rd congressional district election, 1968
Party	Candidate	Votes	%
Democratic	John E. Moss (incumbent)	106,694	55.98
Republican	Elmore J. Duffy	79,717	41.82
American Independent	James Tarleton Slaughter	4,188	2.20
Total votes		190,599	100.00
Turnout			
Democratic hold			

=== District 4 ===
California's 4th congressional district election, 1968
Party	Candidate	Votes	%
Democratic	Robert L. Leggett (incumbent)	88,067	55.54
Republican	James Shumway	65,942	41.59
American Independent	Gene Clark	4,545	2.87
Total votes		158,554	100.00
Turnout			
Democratic hold			

=== District 5 ===
California's 5th congressional district election, 1968
Party	Candidate	Votes	%
Democratic	Phillip Burton (incumbent)	86,647	72.01
Republican	Waldo Velasquez	29,123	24.20
Peace and Freedom	Marvin Garson	4,549	3.78
Total votes		120,319	100.00
Turnout			
Democratic hold			

=== District 6 ===
California's 6th congressional district election, 1968
Party	Candidate	Votes	%
Republican	William S. Mailliard (incumbent)	140,071	72.76
Democratic	Phillip Drath	52,433	27.24
Total votes		192,504	100.00
Turnout			
Democratic hold			

=== District 7 ===
California's 7th congressional district election, 1968
Party	Candidate	Votes	%
Democratic	Jeffery Cohelan (incumbent)	102,108	62.87
Republican	Barney E. Hilburn	48,133	29.64
Peace and Freedom	Huey Newton	12,164	7.49
Total votes		162,405	100.00
Turnout			
Democratic hold			

=== District 8 ===
California's 8th congressional district election, 1968
Party	Candidate	Votes	%
Democratic	George P. Miller (incumbent)	104,231	64.02
Republican	Raymond P. Britton	58,584	35.98
Total votes		162,815	100.00
Turnout			
Democratic hold			

=== District 9 ===
California's 9th congressional district election, 1968
Party	Candidate	Votes	%
Democratic	Don Edwards (incumbent)	100,891	56.55
Republican	Larry Fargher	77,521	43.45
Total votes		178,412	100.00
Turnout			
Democratic hold			

=== District 10 ===
California's 10th congressional district election, 1968
Party	Candidate	Votes	%
Republican	Charles S. Gubser (incumbent)	160,204	67.31
Democratic	Grayson S. Taketa	73,530	30.89
Peace and Freedom	Martin L. Primach	4,276	1.80
Total votes		238,010	100.00
Turnout			
Republican hold			

=== District 11 ===
California's 11th congressional district election, 1968
Party	Candidate	Votes	%
Republican	Pete McCloskey (incumbent)	165,482	79.32
Democratic	Urban G. Whitaker, Jr.	40,979	19.64
Peace and Freedom	David Demorest Ransom	2,157	1.03
Total votes		208,618	100.00
Turnout			
Republican hold			

=== District 12 ===
California's 12th congressional district election, 1968
Party	Candidate	Votes	%
Republican	Burt L. Talcott (incumbent)	140,713	94.88
American Independent	Ann J. Holliday	7,593	5.12
Total votes		148,308	100.00
Turnout			
Republican hold			

=== District 13 ===
California's 13th congressional district election, 1968
Party	Candidate	Votes	%
Republican	Charles M. Teague (incumbent)	148,357	65.85
Democratic	Stanley K. Sheinbaum	76,928	34.15
Total votes		225,285	100.00
Turnout			
Republican hold			

=== District 14 ===
California's 14th congressional district election, 1968
Party	Candidate	Votes	%
Democratic	Jerome Waldie (incumbent)	152,500	71.58
Republican	David W. Schuh	56,598	26.57
American Independent	Luis W. Hamilton	3,945	1.85
Total votes		213,043	100.00
Turnout			
Democratic hold			

=== District 15 ===
California's 15th congressional district election, 1968
Party	Candidate	Votes	%
Democratic	John J. McFall (incumbent)	85,761	53.79
Republican	Sam Van Dyken	73,685	46.21
Total votes		159,446	100.00
Turnout			
Democratic hold			

=== District 16 ===
California's 16th congressional district election, 1968
Party	Candidate	Votes	%
Democratic	Bernice F. Sisk (incumbent)	97,473	62.46
Republican	Dave Harris	55,192	35.37
American Independent	John P. Carroll	3,390	2.17
Total votes		156,055	100.00
Turnout			
Democratic hold			

=== District 17 ===
California's 17th congressional district election, 1968
Party	Candidate	Votes	%
Democratic	Glenn M. Anderson	75,070	50.75
Republican	Joe Blatchford	71,174	48.11
Peace and Freedom	Ben Dobbs	1,685	1.14
Total votes		147,929	100.00
Turnout			
Democratic hold			

=== District 18 ===
California's 18th congressional district election, 1968
Party	Candidate	Votes	%
Republican	Bob Mathias (incumbent)	100,008	65.17
Democratic	Harlan Hagen	51,274	33.41
American Independent	Edward Calvin Williams	2,186	1.42
Total votes		153,468	100.00
Turnout			
Republican hold			

=== District 19 ===
California's 19th congressional district election, 1968
Party	Candidate	Votes	%
Democratic	Chet Holifield (incumbent)	96,857	63.25
Republican	Bill Jones	52,284	34.14
American Independent	Wayne L. Cook	3,996	2.61
Total votes		153,137	100.00
Turnout			
Democratic hold			

=== District 20 ===
California's 20th congressional district election, 1968
Party	Candidate	Votes	%
Republican	H. Allen Smith (incumbent)	133,148	69.30
Democratic	Don White	56,008	29.15
Peace and Freedom	Robert J. Clarke	2,965	1.54
Total votes		192,121	100.00
Turnout			
Republican hold			

=== District 21 ===
California's 21st congressional district election, 1968
Party	Candidate	Votes	%
Democratic	Augustus F. Hawkins (incumbent)	87,205	91.60
Republican	Rayfield Lundy	7,995	8.40
Total votes		95,200	100.00
Turnout			
Democratic hold			

=== District 22 ===
California's 22nd congressional district election, 1968
Party	Candidate	Votes	%
Democratic	James C. Corman (incumbent)	102,332	56.92
Republican	Joe Holt	74,433	41.40
Peace and Freedom	Hugh Manes	3,024	1.68
Total votes		179,789	100.00
Turnout			
Democratic hold			

=== District 23 ===
California's 23rd congressional district election, 1968
Party	Candidate	Votes	%
Republican	Del M. Clawson (incumbent)	95,628	64.95
Democratic	Jim Sperrazzo	51,606	35.05
Total votes		147,234	100.00
Turnout			
Republican hold			

=== District 24 ===
California's 24th congressional district election, 1968
Party	Candidate	Votes	%
Republican	Glenard P. Lipscomb (incumbent)	152,180	72.85
Democratic	Fred Warner Neal	56,723	27.15
Total votes		208,903	100.00
Turnout			
Republican hold			

=== District 25 ===
California's 25th congressional district election, 1968
Party	Candidate	Votes	%
Republican	Charles E. Wiggins (incumbent)	141,600	68.63
Democratic	Keith F. Shirey	64,732	31.37
Total votes		206,332	100.00
Turnout			
Republican hold			

=== District 26 ===
California's 26th congressional district election, 1968
Party	Candidate	Votes	%
Democratic	Thomas M. Rees (incumbent)	132,447	65.49
Republican	Irving Teichner	63,393	31.35
Peace and Freedom	Jack Weinberg	6,394	3.16
Total votes		202,234	100.00
Turnout			
Democratic hold			

=== District 27 ===
California's 27th congressional district election, 1968
Party	Candidate	Votes	%
Republican	Edwin Reinecke (incumbent)	158,309	72.25
Democratic	John T. Butchko	60,808	27.75
Total votes		219,117	100.00
Turnout			
Republican hold			

=== District 28 ===
California's 28th congressional district election, 1968
Party	Candidate	Votes	%
Republican	Alphonzo E. Bell, Jr. (incumbent)	168,208	71.24
Democratic	John McKee Pratt	63,414	26.86
Peace and Freedom	Sherman Pearl	4,503	1.91
Total votes		236,125	100.00
Turnout			
Republican hold			

=== District 29 ===
California's 29th congressional district election, 1968
Party	Candidate	Votes	%
Democratic	George Brown, Jr. (incumbent)	74,807	52.31
Republican	Bill Orozco	68,213	47.69
Total votes		143,020	100.00
Turnout			
Democratic hold			

=== District 30 ===
California's 30th congressional district election, 1968
Party	Candidate	Votes	%
Democratic	Edward R. Roybal (incumbent)	75,381	67.49
Republican	Samuel F. Cavnar	36,312	32.51
Total votes		111,693	100.00
Turnout			
Democratic hold			

=== District 31 ===
California's 31st congressional district election, 1968
Party	Candidate	Votes	%
Democratic	Charles H. Wilson (incumbent)	94,387	58.91
Republican	James R. Dunn	62,711	39.14
American Independent	Stanley L. Schulte	3,134	1.96
Total votes		160,232	100.00
Turnout			
Democratic hold			

=== District 32 ===
California's 32nd congressional district election, 1968
Party	Candidate	Votes	%
Republican	Craig Hosmer (incumbent)	138,494	73.78
Democratic	Arthur J. Gottlieb	45,308	24.14
American Independent	Richard B. Williams	3,898	2.08
Total votes		187,700	100.00
Turnout			
Republican hold			

=== District 33 ===
California's 33rd congressional district election, 1968
Party	Candidate	Votes	%
Republican	Jerry Pettis (incumbent)	123,426	66.28
Democratic	Al C. Bellard	59,619	32.02
American Independent	Earl D. Wallen	3,171	1.70
Total votes		186,216	100.00
Turnout			
Republican hold			

=== District 34 ===
California's 34th congressional district election, 1968
Party	Candidate	Votes	%
Democratic	Richard T. Hanna (incumbent)	105,880	50.85
Republican	Bill J. Teague	102,333	49.15
Total votes		208,213	100.00
Turnout			
Democratic hold			

=== District 35 ===
California's 35th congressional district election, 1968
Party	Candidate	Votes	%
Republican	James B. Utt (incumbent)	212,684	72.47
Democratic	Thomas B. Lenhart	73,778	25.14
American Independent	Annie McDonald	7,000	2.39
Total votes		293,462	100.00
Turnout			
Republican hold			

=== District 36 ===
California's 36th congressional district election, 1968
Party	Candidate	Votes	%
Republican	Bob Wilson (incumbent)	147,772	71.61
Democratic	Don Lindgren	58,578	28.39
Total votes		206,350	100.00
Turnout			
Republican hold			

=== District 37 ===
California's 37th congressional district election, 1968
Party	Candidate	Votes	%
Democratic	Lionel Van Deerlin (incumbent)	95,591	64.67
Republican	Mike Schaefer	52,212	35.33
Total votes		147,803	100.00
Turnout			
Democratic hold			

=== District 38 ===
California's 38th congressional district election, 1968
Party	Candidate	Votes	%
Democratic	John V. Tunney (incumbent)	121,025	62.76
Republican	Robert O. Hunter	68,196	35.36
American Independent	James H. Griffin	2,415	1.25
Peace and Freedom	Terese A. Karmel	1,205	0.62
Total votes		192,841	100.00
Turnout			
Democratic hold			

== See also ==
- 91st United States Congress
- Political party strength in California
- Political party strength in U.S. states
- 1968 United States House of Representatives elections
