= 1954 United States House of Representatives elections in California =

- November 6, 1954

All 30 California seats to the United States House of Representatives
	Majority party	Minority party	Third party
Party	Republican	Democratic	Progressive
Last election	19	11	0
Seats won	19	11	0
Seat change	Steady	Steady	Steady
Popular vote	1,907,407	1,902,384	63,284
Percentage	49.25%	49.12%	1.63%
- Democratic gain Republican gain Democratic hold Republican hold

The United States House of Representatives elections in California, 1954 was an election for California's delegation to the United States House of Representatives, which occurred as part of the general election of the House of Representatives on November 6, 1954. Neither party made any net gains.

== Overview ==
United States House of Representatives elections in California, 1954
Party	Votes	%	Before	After	+/–
Republican	1,907,407	49.25%	19	19	0
Democratic	1,902,384	49.12%	11	11	0
Progressive	63,284	1.63%	0	0	0
Totals	3,873,075	100.0%	30	30	—

== Results ==
Final results from the Clerk of the House of Representatives:

=== District 1 ===
California's 1st congressional district election, 1954
Party	Candidate	Votes	%
Republican	Hubert B. Scudder (incumbent)	83,762	59.1
Progressive	Max Kortum	58,004	40.9
Total votes		141,766	100.0
Turnout			
Republican hold			

=== District 2 ===
California's 2nd congressional district election, 1954
Party	Candidate	Votes	%
Democratic	Clair Engle (incumbent)	113,104	100.0
Turnout			
Democratic hold			

=== District 3 ===
California's 3rd congressional district election, 1954
Party	Candidate	Votes	%
Democratic	John E. Moss (incumbent)	96,238	65.3
Republican	James H. Phillips	51,111	34.7
Total votes		147,349	100.0
Turnout			
Democratic hold			

=== District 4 ===
California's 4th congressional district election, 1954
Party	Candidate	Votes	%
Republican	William S. Mailliard (incumbent)	88,439	61.2
Democratic	Philip A. O'Rourke	52,980	36.7
Progressive	George R. Andersen	2,987	2.1
Total votes		144,406	100.0
Turnout			
Republican hold			

=== District 5 ===
California's 5th congressional district election, 1954
Party	Candidate	Votes	%
Democratic	John F. Shelley (incumbent)	86,428	100.0
Turnout			
Democratic hold			

=== District 6 ===
California's 6th congressional district election, 1954
Party	Candidate	Votes	%
Republican	John F. Baldwin, Jr.	72,336	50.9
Democratic	Robert Condon (incumbent)	69,776	49.1
Total votes		142,112	100.0
Turnout			
Republican gain from Democratic			

=== District 7 ===
California's 7th congressional district election, 1954
Party	Candidate	Votes	%
Republican	John J. Allen, Jr. (incumbent)	64,083	53
Democratic	Stanley K. Crook	56,807	47
Total votes		120,890	100
Turnout			
Republican hold			

=== District 8 ===
California's 8th congressional district election, 1954
Party	Candidate	Votes	%
Democratic	George P. Miller (incumbent)	101,803	65.4
Republican	Jessie M. Ritchie	53,869	34.6
Total votes		155,672	100.0
Turnout			
Democratic hold			

=== District 9 ===
California's 9th congressional district election, 1954
Party	Candidate	Votes	%
Republican	J. Arthur Younger (incumbent)	60,648	54.5
Democratic	Harold F. Taggart	50,619	45.5
Total votes		111,267	100.0
Turnout			
Republican hold			

=== District 10 ===
California's 10th congressional district election, 1954
Party	Candidate	Votes	%
Republican	Charles S. Gubser (incumbent)	94,418	61.2
Democratic	Paul V. Birmingham	59,843	38.8
Total votes		154,261	100.0
Turnout			
Republican hold			

=== District 11 ===
California's 11th congressional district election, 1954
Party	Candidate	Votes	%
Republican	Justin L. Johnson (incumbent)	54,716	52.6
Democratic	Carl Sugar	49,388	47.4
Total votes		104,104	100.0
Turnout			
Republican hold			

=== District 12 ===
California's 12th congressional district election, 1954
Party	Candidate	Votes	%
Democratic	Bernice F. Sisk	63,911	53.8
Republican	Allan O. Hunter (incumbent)	54,903	46.2
Total votes		118,814	100.0
Turnout			
Democratic gain from Republican			

=== District 13 ===
California's 13th congressional district election, 1954
Party	Candidate	Votes	%
Republican	Charles M. Teague	69,287	52.5
Democratic	Timothy I. O'Reilly	62,786	47.5
Total votes		132,073	100.0
Turnout			
Republican hold			

=== District 14 ===
California's 14th congressional district election, 1954
Party	Candidate	Votes	%
Democratic	Harlan Hagen (incumbent)	75,194	65
Republican	Al Blain	40,270	35
Total votes		115,464	100
Turnout			
Democratic hold			

=== District 15 ===
California's 15th congressional district election, 1954
Party	Candidate	Votes	%
Republican	Gordon L. McDonough (incumbent)	77,651	56.9
Democratic	Frank P. O'Sullivan	58,785	43.1
Total votes		136,436	100.0
Turnout			
Republican hold			

=== District 16 ===
California's 16th congressional district election, 1954
Party	Candidate	Votes	%
Republican	Donald L. Jackson (incumbent)	63,124	60.8
Democratic	S. Mark Hogue	40,659	39.2
Total votes		103,783	100.0
Turnout			
Republican hold			

=== District 17 ===
California's 17th congressional district election, 1954
Party	Candidate	Votes	%
Democratic	Cecil R. King (incumbent)	97,828	60.1
Republican	Robert H. Finch	64,967	39.9
Total votes		162,795	100.0
Turnout			
Democratic hold			

=== District 18 ===
California's 18th congressional district election, 1954
Party	Candidate	Votes	%
Republican	Craig Hosmer (incumbent)	71,731	55
Democratic	Joseph M. Kennick	58,647	45
Total votes		130,378	100
Turnout			
Republican hold			

=== District 19 ===
California's 19th congressional district election, 1954
Party	Candidate	Votes	%
Democratic	Chet Holifield (incumbent)	90,269	74.8
Republican	Raymond R. Pritchard	30,404	25.2
Total votes		120,673	100.0
Turnout			
Democratic hold			

=== District 20 ===
California's 20th congressional district election, 1954
Party	Candidate	Votes	%
Republican	John Carl Hinshaw (incumbent)	71,213	71.2
Democratic	Eugene Radding	28,838	28.8
Total votes		100,051	100.0
Turnout			
Republican hold			

=== District 21 ===
California's 21st congressional district election, 1954
Party	Candidate	Votes	%
Republican	Edgar W. Hiestand (incumbent)	100,258	58.7
Democratic	William E. "Bill" Roskam	70,486	41.3
Total votes		170,744	100.0
Turnout			
Democratic hold			

=== District 22 ===
California's 22nd congressional district election, 1954
Party	Candidate	Votes	%
Republican	Joseph F. Holt (incumbent)	65,165	58.2
Democratic	William M. "Bill" Costley	46,875	41.8
Total votes		112,040	100.0
Turnout			
Republican hold			

=== District 23 ===
California's 23rd congressional district election, 1954
Party	Candidate	Votes	%
Democratic	Clyde Doyle (incumbent)	90,729	70.9
Republican	Frank G. Bussing	34,911	27.3
Progressive	Olive T. Thompson	2,293	1.8
Total votes		127,933	100.0
Turnout			
Democratic hold			

=== District 24 ===
California's 24th congressional district election, 1954
Party	Candidate	Votes	%
Republican	Glenard P. Lipscomb (incumbent)	65,431	56.9
Democratic	George Arnold	49,592	43.1
Total votes		115,023	100.0
Turnout			
Republican hold			

=== District 25 ===
California's 25th congressional district election, 1954
Party	Candidate	Votes	%
Republican	Patrick J. Hillings (incumbent)	113,027	65.2
Democratic	John S. Sobieski	60,370	34.8
Total votes		173,397	100.0
Turnout			
Republican hold			

=== District 26 ===
California's 26th congressional district election, 1954
Party	Candidate	Votes	%
Democratic	James Roosevelt	94,261	60.1
Republican	Theodore R. "Ted" Owings	62,585	39.9
Total votes		156,856	100.0
Turnout			
Democratic hold			

=== District 27 ===
California's 27th congressional district election, 1954
Party	Candidate	Votes	%
Democratic	Harry R. Sheppard (incumbent)	65,389	64.8
Republican	Martin K. Barrett	35,594	35.2
Total votes		100,983	100.0
Turnout			
Democratic hold			

=== District 28 ===
California's 28th congressional district election, 1954
Party	Candidate	Votes	%
Republican	James B. Utt (incumbent)	95,680	66.2
Democratic	Harriet Enderle	48,785	33.8
Total votes		144,465	100.0
Turnout			
Republican hold			

=== District 29 ===
California's 29th congressional district election, 1954
Party	Candidate	Votes	%
Republican	John R. Phillips (incumbent)	42,420	58
Republican	Bruce Shangle	30,781	42
Total votes		73,201	100
Turnout			
Republican hold			

=== District 30 ===
California's 30th congressional district election, 1954
Party	Candidate	Votes	%
Republican	Bob Wilson (incumbent)	94,623	60.4
Democratic	Ross T. McIntire	61,994	39.6
Total votes		156,617	100.0
Turnout			
Republican hold			

== See also ==
- 84th United States Congress
- Political party strength in California
- Political party strength in U.S. states
- 1954 United States House of Representatives elections
