= 1964 United States House of Representatives elections in California =

- November 3, 1964

All 38 California seats to the United States House of Representatives
	Majority party	Minority party
Party	Democratic	Republican
Last election	25	13
Seats won	25	13
Seat change	Steady	Steady
Popular vote	3,609,314	3,213,828
Percentage	52.89%	47.10%
- Democratic gain Republican gain Democratic hold Republican hold

The United States House of Representatives elections in California, 1964 was an election for California's delegation to the United States House of Representatives, which occurred as part of the general election of the House of Representatives on November 3, 1964. One Republican-held district and one previously Democratic-held open seat switched parties, resulting in no net change in the balance of 23 Democrats and 15 Republicans.

== Overview ==
United States HoR elections in California, 1964
Party	Votes	%	Seats
Democratic	3,609,314	52.89%	25
Republican	3,213,828	47.10%	13
Scattering	586	0.01%	0
Totals	6,823,728	100.00%	38

== Special election ==
On February 18, 1964, a special election was held in the 5th district. Incumbent John Shelley (D) had resigned January 7, 1964, to become Mayor of San Francisco. Phillip Burton (D) won the special election and would run again in November for the full term.

== Results ==
Final results from the Clerk of the House of Representatives:

=== District 1 ===
California's 1st congressional district election, 1964
Party	Candidate	Votes	%
Republican	Don H. Clausen (incumbent)	141,048	59.09
Democratic	George McCabe	97,651	40.91
No party	Scattering	11	0.00
Total votes		238,710	100.00
Turnout			
Republican hold			

=== District 2 ===
California's 2nd congressional district election, 1964
Party	Candidate	Votes	%
Democratic	Harold T. Johnson (incumbent)	125,774	64.63
Republican	Chester C. Merriam	68,835	35.37
No party	Scattering	11	0.01
Total votes		194,620	100.00
Turnout			
Democratic hold			

=== District 3 ===
California's 3rd congressional district election, 1964
Party	Candidate	Votes	%
Democratic	John E. Moss (incumbent)	166,688	74.30
Republican	Einer B. Gjelsteen	57,630	25.69
No party	Scattering	14	0.00
Total votes		224,332	100.00
Turnout			
Democratic hold			

=== District 4 ===
California's 4th congressional district election, 1964
Party	Candidate	Votes	%
Democratic	Robert L. Leggett (incumbent)	84,949	71.92
Republican	Ivan Norris	33,160	28.07
No party	Scattering	13	0.01
Total votes		118,122	100.00
Turnout			
Democratic hold			

=== District 5 ===
California's 5th congressional district election, 1964
Party	Candidate	Votes	%
Democratic	Phillip Burton (incumbent)	71,638	100.00
No party	Scattering	1	0.00
Total votes		71,639	100.00
Turnout			
Democratic hold			

=== District 6 ===
California's 6th congressional district election, 1964
Party	Candidate	Votes	%
Republican	William S. Mailliard (incumbent)	125,869	63.65
Democratic	Thomas O'Toole	71,894	36.35
No party	Scattering	0	0.00
Total votes		197,763	100.00
Turnout			
Democratic hold			

=== District 7 ===
California's 7th congressional district election, 1964
Party	Candidate	Votes	%
Democratic	Jeffery Cohelan (incumbent)	100,901	66.12
Republican	Lawrence E. McNutt	51,675	33.86
No party	Scattering	16	0.01
Total votes		192,592	100.00
Turnout			
Democratic hold			

=== District 8 ===
California's 8th congressional district election, 1964
Party	Candidate	Votes	%
Democratic	George P. Miller (incumbent)	108,771	70.25
Republican	Donald E. McKay	46,063	29.75
No party	Scattering	8	0.01
Total votes		154,842	100.00
Turnout			
Democratic hold			

=== District 9 ===
California's 9th congressional district election, 1964
Party	Candidate	Votes	%
Democratic	Don Edwards (incumbent)	115,954	69.76
Republican	Joseph F. Donovan	50,261	30.24
No party	Scattering	14	0.01
Total votes		166,229	100.00
Turnout			
Democratic hold			

=== District 10 ===
California's 10th congressional district election, 1964
Party	Candidate	Votes	%
Republican	Charles S. Gubser (incumbent)	151,027	63.12
Democratic	E. Day Carman	88,240	36.88
No party	Scattering	10	0.00
Total votes		239,277	100.00
Turnout			
Republican hold			

=== District 11 ===
California's 11th congressional district election, 1964
Party	Candidate	Votes	%
Republican	J. Arthur Younger (incumbent)	116,022	54.79
Democratic	W. Mark Sullivan	95,747	45.21
No party	Scattering	5	0.00
Total votes		211,774	100.00
Turnout			
Republican hold			

=== District 12 ===
California's 12th congressional district election, 1964
Party	Candidate	Votes	%
Republican	Burt L. Talcott (incumbent)	93,112	61.92
Democratic	William K. Steward	57,242	38.07
No party	Scattering	19	0.01
Total votes		150,373	100.00
Turnout			
Republican hold			

=== District 13 ===
California's 13th congressional district election, 1964
Party	Candidate	Votes	%
Republican	Charles M. Teague (incumbent)	104,744	57.39
Democratic	George E. Taylor	77,763	42.61
No party	Scattering	4	0.00
Total votes		182,511	100.00
Turnout			
Republican hold			

=== District 14 ===
California's 14th congressional district election, 1964
Party	Candidate	Votes	%
Republican	John F. Baldwin, Jr. (incumbent)	117,272	64.88
Democratic	Russell M. Koch	63,469	35.11
No party	Scattering	18	0.01
Total votes		180,759	100.00
Turnout			
Republican hold			

=== District 15 ===
California's 15th congressional district election, 1964
Party	Candidate	Votes	%
Democratic	John J. McFall (incumbent)	109,560	70.89
Republican	Kenneth Gibson	44,977	29.10
No party	Scattering	15	0.01
Total votes		154,552	100.00
Turnout			
Democratic hold			

=== District 16 ===
California's 16th congressional district election, 1964
Party	Candidate	Votes	%
Democratic	Bernice F. Sisk (incumbent)	117,727	66.76
Republican	David T. Harris	58,604	33.23
No party	Scattering	9	0.01
Total votes		176,340	100.00
Turnout			
Democratic hold			

=== District 17 ===
California's 17th congressional district election, 1964
Party	Candidate	Votes	%
Democratic	Cecil R. King (incumbent)	95,640	67.66
Republican	Robert Muncaster	45,688	32.32
No party	Scattering	20	0.01
Total votes		141,348	100.00
Turnout			
Democratic hold			

=== District 18 ===
California's 18th congressional district election, 1964
Party	Candidate	Votes	%
Democratic	Harlan Hagen (incumbent)	121,304	66.71
Republican	James E. Williams, Jr.	60,523	33.28
No party	Scattering	12	0.01
Total votes		181,839	100.00
Turnout			
Democratic hold			

=== District 19 ===
California's 19th congressional district election, 1964
Party	Candidate	Votes	%
Democratic	Chet Holifield (incumbent)	97,934	65.42
Republican	C. Everett Hunt	51,747	34.57
No party	Scattering	12	0.01
Total votes		149,693	100.00
Turnout			
Democratic hold			

=== District 20 ===
California's 20th congressional district election, 1964
Party	Candidate	Votes	%
Republican	H. Allen Smith (incumbent)	132,402	67.88
Democratic	C. Bernard Kaufman	62,645	32.12
No party	Scattering	7	0.00
Total votes		195,054	100.00
Turnout			
Republican hold			

=== District 21 ===
California's 21st congressional district election, 1964
Party	Candidate	Votes	%
Democratic	Augustus F. Hawkins (incumbent)	106,231	90.27
Republican	Rayfield Lundy	11,374	9.67
No party	Scattering	72	0.06
Total votes		117,677	100.00
Turnout			
Democratic hold			

=== District 22 ===
California's 22nd congressional district election, 1964
Party	Candidate	Votes	%
Democratic	James C. Corman (incumbent)	94,141	50.53
Republican	Robert C. Cline	92,133	49.46
No party	Scattering	20	0.01
Total votes		186,294	100.00
Turnout			
Democratic hold			

=== District 23 ===
California's 23rd congressional district election, 1964
Party	Candidate	Votes	%
Republican	Del M. Clawson (incumbent)	90,721	55.43
Democratic	H. O. Van Pettin	72,903	44.54
No party	Scattering	40	0.02
Total votes		163,664	100.00
Turnout			
Republican hold			

=== District 24 ===
California's 24th congressional district election, 1964
Party	Candidate	Votes	%
Republican	Glenard P. Lipscomb (incumbent)	139,784	67.94
Democratic	Bryan W. Stevens	65,967	32.06
No party	Scattering	7	0.00
Total votes		205,758	100.00
Turnout			
Republican hold			

=== District 25 ===
California's 25th congressional district election, 1964
Party	Candidate	Votes	%
Democratic	Ronald B. Cameron (incumbent)	81,320	55.44
Republican	Frank J. Walton	65,344	44.55
No party	Scattering	8	0.01
Total votes		146,672	100.00
Turnout			
Democratic hold			

=== District 26 ===
California's 26th congressional district election, 1964
Party	Candidate	Votes	%
Democratic	James Roosevelt (incumbent)	136,025	70.39
Republican	Gil Seton	57,209	29.60
No party	Scattering	13	0.01
Total votes		193,247	100.00
Turnout			
Democratic hold			

=== District 27 ===
California's 27th congressional district election, 1964
Party	Candidate	Votes	%
Republican	Edwin Reinecke	83,141	51.72
Democratic	Tom Bane	77,587	48.27
No party	Scattering	15	0.01
Total votes		160,743	100.00
Turnout			
Republican gain from Democratic			

=== District 28 ===
California's 28th congressional district election, 1964
Party	Candidate	Votes	%
Republican	Alphonzo E. Bell, Jr. (incumbent)	205,473	65.57
Democratic	Gerald A. Gottlieb	107,852	34.42
No party	Scattering	41	0.01
Total votes		313,366	100.00
Turnout			
Republican hold			

=== District 29 ===
California's 29th congressional district election, 1964
Party	Candidate	Votes	%
Democratic	George Brown, Jr. (incumbent)	90,208	58.56
Republican	Charles J. Farrington, Jr.	63,836	41.44
No party	Scattering	5	0.00
Total votes		154,049	100.00
Turnout			
Democratic hold			

=== District 30 ===
California's 30th congressional district election, 1964
Party	Candidate	Votes	%
Democratic	Edward R. Roybal (incumbent)	90,329	66.30
Republican	Alfred J. Feder	45,912	33.70
No party	Scattering	7	0.01
Total votes		136,248	100.00
Turnout			
Democratic hold			

=== District 31 ===
California's 31st congressional district election, 1964
Party	Candidate	Votes	%
Democratic	Charles H. Wilson (incumbent)	114,246	63.99
Republican	Norman G. Shanahan	64,256	35.99
No party	Scattering	27	0.02
Total votes		178,529	100.00
Turnout			
Democratic hold			

=== District 32 ===
California's 32nd congressional district election, 1964
Party	Candidate	Votes	%
Republican	Craig Hosmer (incumbent)	132,603	68.93
Democratic	Michael Cullen	59,765	31.07
No party	Scattering	17	0.01
Total votes		192,385	100.00
Turnout			
Republican hold			

=== District 33 ===
California's 33rd congressional district election, 1964
Party	Candidate	Votes	%
Democratic	Kenneth W. Dyal	109,047	51.72
Republican	Jerry Pettis	101,742	48.26
No party	Scattering	41	0.02
Total votes		210,830	100.00
Turnout			
Democratic hold			

=== District 34 ===
California's 34th congressional district election, 1964
Party	Candidate	Votes	%
Democratic	Richard T. Hanna (incumbent)	137,588	58.25
Republican	Robert A. Geier	98,606	41.75
No party	Scattering	12	0.01
Total votes		236,206	100.00
Turnout			
Democratic hold			

=== District 35 ===
California's 35th congressional district election, 1964
Party	Candidate	Votes	%
Republican	James B. Utt (incumbent)	167,791	65.01
Democratic	Paul B. Carpenter	90,295	34.98
No party	Scattering	15	0.01
Total votes		258,101	100.00
Turnout			
Republican hold			

=== District 36 ===
California's 36th congressional district election, 1964
Party	Candidate	Votes	%
Republican	Bob Wilson (incumbent)	105,346	59.05
Democratic	Quintin Whelan	73,034	40.94
No party	Scattering	15	0.01
Total votes		178,395	100.00
Turnout			
Republican hold			

=== District 37 ===
California's 37th congressional district election, 1964
Party	Candidate	Votes	%
Democratic	Lionel Van Deerlin (incumbent)	85,624	58.24
Republican	Dick Wilson	61,373	41.75
No party	Scattering	11	0.01
Total votes		147,008	100.00
Turnout			
Democratic hold			

=== District 38 ===
California's 38th congressional district election, 1964
Party	Candidate	Votes	%
Democratic	John V. Tunney	85,661	52.82
Republican	Patrick M. Martin (incumbent)	76,525	47.18
No party	Scattering	1	0.00
Total votes		162,187	100.00
Turnout			
Democratic gain from Republican			

== See also ==
- 89th United States Congress
- Political party strength in California
- Political party strength in U.S. states
- 1964 United States House of Representatives elections
