= 1950 United States House of Representatives elections in California =

- November 7, 1950

All 23 California seats to the United States House of Representatives
	Majority party	Minority party	Third party
Party	Republican	Democratic	Progressive
Last election	12	11	0
Seats won	13	10	0
Seat change	▲1	▼1	Steady
Popular vote	1,754,001	1,480,639	105,396
Percentage	52.24%	44.10%	3.14%
- Republican gain Democratic hold Republican hold

The United States House of Representatives elections in California, 1950 was an election for California's delegation to the United States House of Representatives, which occurred as part of the general election of the House of Representatives on November 7, 1950. Republicans won one Democratic-held seat.

== Overview ==
United States House of Representatives elections in California, 1950
Party	Votes	%	Before	After	+/–
Republican	1,754,001	52.24%	12	13	+1
Democratic	1,480,639	44.10%	11	10	-1
Progressive	105,396	3.14%	0	0	0
Prohibition	10,339	0.31%	0	0	0
Independent	7,329	0.22%	0	0	0
Totals	3,357,704	100.0%	23	23	—

== Results ==
Final results from the Clerk of the House of Representatives:

=== District 1 ===
California's 1st congressional district election, 1950
Party	Candidate	Votes	%
Republican	Hubert B. Scudder (incumbent)	85,122	54
Democratic	Roger Kent	72,584	46
Total votes		157,706	100
Turnout			
Republican hold			

=== District 2 ===
California's 2nd congressional district election, 1950
Party	Candidate	Votes	%
Democratic	Clair Engle (incumbent)	85,103	100.0
Turnout			
Democratic hold			

=== District 3 ===
California's 3rd congressional district election, 1950
Party	Candidate	Votes	%
Republican	Justin L. Johnson (incumbent)	177,269	100.0
Turnout			
Republican hold			

=== District 4 ===
California's 4th congressional district election, 1950
Party	Candidate	Votes	%
Democratic	Franck R. Havenner (incumbent)	83,078	67.2
Republican	William S. Mailliard	40,569	32.8
Total votes		123,647	100.0
Turnout			
Democratic hold			

=== District 5 ===
California's 5th congressional district election, 1950
Party	Candidate	Votes	%
Democratic	John F. Shelley (incumbent)	117,888	100.0
Turnout			
Democratic hold			

=== District 6 ===
California's 6th congressional district election, 1950
Party	Candidate	Votes	%
Democratic	George P. Miller (incumbent)	192,342	100.0
Turnout			
Democratic hold			

=== District 7 ===
California's 7th congressional district election, 1950
Party	Candidate	Votes	%
Republican	John J. Allen, Jr. (incumbent)	74,069	55.3
Democratic	Lyle E. Cook	59,976	44.7
Total votes		134,045	100.0
Turnout			
Republican hold			

=== District 8 ===
California's 8th congressional district election, 1950
Party	Candidate	Votes	%
Republican	Jack Z. Anderson (incumbent)	168,510	83.1
Progressive	John A. Peterson	34,176	16.9
Total votes		202,686	100.0
Turnout			
Republican hold			

=== District 9 ===
California's 9th congressional district election, 1950
Party	Candidate	Votes	%
Republican	Allan O. Hunter	76,015	52
Democratic	Cecil F. White (incumbent)	70,201	48
Total votes		146,216	100
Turnout			
Republican gain from Democratic			

=== District 10 ===
California's 10th congressional district election, 1950
Party	Candidate	Votes	%
Republican	Thomas H. Werdel (incumbent)	59,313	53.6
Democratic	Ardis M. Walker	51,409	46.4
Total votes		110,722	100.0
Turnout			
Republican hold			

=== District 11 ===
California's 11th congressional district election, 1950
Party	Candidate	Votes	%
Republican	Ernest K. Bramblett (incumbent)	59,780	52.1
Democratic	Marion R. Walker	55,020	47.9
Total votes		114,800	100.0
Turnout			
Republican hold			

=== District 12 ===
California's 12th congressional district election, 1950
Party	Candidate	Votes	%
Republican	Patrick J. Hillings	107,933	60.1
Democratic	Steve Zetterberg	71,682	39.9
Total votes		179,615	100.0
Turnout			
Republican hold			

=== District 13 ===
California's 13th congressional district election, 1950
Party	Candidate	Votes	%
Republican	Norris Poulson (incumbent)	83,296	84.9
Progressive	Ellen P. Davidson	14,789	15.1
Total votes		98,085	100.0
Turnout			
Republican hold			

=== District 14 ===
California's 14th congressional district election, 1950
Party	Candidate	Votes	%
Democratic	Sam Yorty	47,653	49.4
Republican	Jack W. Hardy	35,543	36.8
Progressive	Charlotta A. Bass	13,364	13.8
Total votes		96,560	100.0
Turnout			
Democratic hold			

=== District 15 ===
California's 15th congressional district election, 1950
Party	Candidate	Votes	%
Republican	Gordon L. McDonough (incumbent)	112,704	87.2
Progressive	Jeanne Cole	16,559	12.8
Total votes		129,263	100.0
Turnout			
Republican hold			

=== District 16 ===
California's 16th congressional district election, 1950
Party	Candidate	Votes	%
Republican	Donald L. Jackson (incumbent)	115,970	59.3
Democratic	S. Mark Hogue	79,744	40.7
Total votes		195,714	100.0
Turnout			
Republican hold			

=== District 17 ===
California's 17th congressional district election, 1950
Party	Candidate	Votes	%
Democratic	Cecil R. King (incumbent)	166,334	100.0
Turnout			
Democratic hold			

=== District 18 ===
California's 18th congressional district election, 1950
Party	Candidate	Votes	%
Democratic	Clyde Doyle (incumbent)	97,177	50.5
Republican	Craig Hosmer	95,308	49.5
Total votes		192,485	100.0
Turnout			
Democratic hold			

=== District 19 ===
California's 19th congressional district election, 1950
Party	Candidate	Votes	%
Democratic	Chet Holifield (incumbent)	73,317	90.9
Independent	Myra Tanner Weiss	7,329	9.1
Total votes		80,646	100.0
Turnout			
Democratic hold			

=== District 20 ===
California's 20th congressional district election, 1950
Party	Candidate	Votes	%
Republican	John Carl Hinshaw (incumbent)	211,012	85.1
Progressive	William B. Esterman	26,508	10.7
Prohibition	Frank Nelson	10,339	4.2
Total votes		247,859	100.0
Turnout			
Republican hold			

=== District 21 ===
California's 21st congressional district election, 1950
Party	Candidate	Votes	%
Democratic	Harry R. Sheppard (incumbent)	62,994	57.4
Republican	R. E. Reynolds	46,693	42.6
Total votes		109,687	100.0
Turnout			
Democratic hold			

=== District 22 ===
California's 22nd congressional district election, 1950
Party	Candidate	Votes	%
Republican	John J. Phillips (incumbent)	114,497	100.0
Turnout			
Republican hold			

=== District 23 ===
California's 23rd congressional district election, 1950
Party	Candidate	Votes	%
Democratic	Clinton D. McKinnon (incumbent)	94,137	51
Republican	Leslie E. Gehres	90,398	49
Total votes		184,535	100
Turnout			
Democratic hold			

== See also ==
- 82nd United States Congress
- Political party strength in California
- Political party strength in U.S. states
- 1950 United States House of Representatives elections
