= Cecil R. King =

American politician (1898–1974)

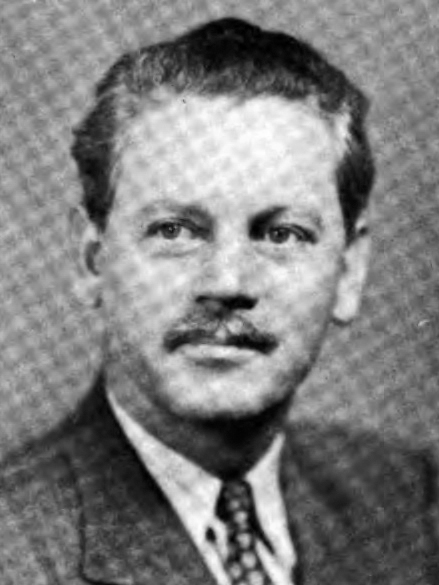

Member of the U.S. House of Representatives from California's 17th district
- In office August 25, 1942 – January 3, 1969
- Preceded by: Lee E. Geyer
- Succeeded by: Glenn M. Anderson

Member of the California State Assembly from the 67th district
- In office January 4, 1937 – August 25, 1942
- Preceded by: Lee E. Geyer
- Succeeded by: Clayton A. Dills
- In office January 2, 1933 – January 7, 1935
- Preceded by: George F. Gillette
- Succeeded by: Lee E. Geyer

Personal details
- Born: Cecil Rhodes King; January 13, 1898 Fort Niagara, New York, U.S.
- Died: March 17, 1974 (aged 76) Inglewood, California, U.S.
- Resting place: Inglewood Park Cemetery
- Party: Democratic
- Children: 1
- Education: University of Southern California

Military service
- Branch/service: United States Army
- Battles/wars: World War I

Cecil Rhodes King (January 13, 1898 – March 17, 1974) was an American businessman and politician. King, a Democrat, served as the first member of the United States House of Representatives from California's 17th congressional district for fourteen terms, serving from August 1942 to January 1969. King was first elected by special election on August 25, 1942, after previously serving out the term of Lee E. Geyer who had died in Washington, D.C., on October 11, 1941.

== Background ==
King was born on January 13, 1898, in Fort Niagara in Niagara County, New York. At the age of ten, King moved with his family to Los Angeles, California.

=== First World War ===
After attending public school in Los Angeles, King enlisted in the United States Army during World War I. In the war, he served as a private, the lowest enlisted rank in the United States Army, from 1917 to 1918. After the war, King got involved in local business in Southern California.

== Politics ==
In 1933, King became a member of the California State Assembly and served in that body until 1942, with the exception of 1936. He served as a delegate from California to the 1940 Democratic National Convention at Chicago Stadium in Chicago, Illinois.

=== Congress ===
The representative for California's 17th congressional district, Lee E. Geyer, died in Washington, D.C., on October 11, 1941. King was elected as a Democrat to the 77th United States Congress in a special election on August 25, 1942, and served out Geyer's unexpired term. Later that year, King ran unopposed in the general election for the full term and captured 92,260 votes, 99.8 percent of the total.

King served as a member of the United States House Committee on Ways and Means, beginning a commitment that he would serve during twelve of his following thirteen terms in the House of Representatives, excluding only 1947–1948, during the 80th United States Congress. Two years later, King again served as one of California's delegates to the 1944 Democratic National Convention again held at Chicago Stadium from July 19 to July 21. In the House elections on November 7, 1944, King again ran unopposed for state's 17th district, and captured 147,217 votes, nearly 100 percent. In the 1946 House elections, King was again unopposed and captured 110,654 votes, or 99.4 percent. At the 1948 Democratic National Convention, King served as an alternate delegate from California. In continuance of the trend, he again ran unopposed in 1948 and 1950 and captured 99.9 percent of the vote in both elections. During the 1950s, King also served as the chairman of the House of Representatives subcommittee investigating tax irregularities.

After facing his first competitive re-election bid in 1952 when he defeated Republican challenger Robert Finch by nearly 11 percent of the vote, King cruised by in future elections, capturing more than 60 percent of the vote in landslide elections in each biennial election from 1954 to 1966. King also was one of the first people involved in the issue of Medicare, and had carried on the battle in the House of Representatives throughout the 1950s and 1960s until President Lyndon B. Johnson signed the Medicare Bill on July 30, 1965.

King voted in favor of the Civil Rights Acts of 1957, 1960, 1964, 1968, as well as the 24th Amendment to the U.S. Constitution and the Voting Rights Act of 1965.

=== Retirement and death ===
After nearly twenty-seven years of service, King was not a candidate for re-election in the 1968 House elections to the 91st United States Congress. His successor, Glenn M. Anderson, won a close election by a slim two percent margin.

On March 17, 1974, King died of a stroke at a nursing home in Inglewood, California, at the age of 76. He was then interred in Inglewood Park Cemetery in Inglewood, California.

== Electoral history ==
Cecil King electoral history

1942 United States House of Representatives elections in California
| Party | Candidate | Votes | % |
|---|---|---|---|
| Democratic | Cecil R. King (incumbent) | 92,260 | 100.0 |
| Turnout | | | |
| Democratic hold | | | |

1944 United States House of Representatives elections in California
| Party | Candidate | Votes | % |
|---|---|---|---|
| Democratic | Cecil R. King (incumbent) | 147,217 | 100.0 |
| Turnout | | | |
| Democratic hold | | | |

1946 United States House of Representatives elections in California
| Party | Candidate | Votes | % |
|---|---|---|---|
| Democratic | Cecil R. King (incumbent) | 110,654 | 100.0 |
| Turnout | | | |
| Democratic hold | | | |

1948 United States House of Representatives elections in California
| Party | Candidate | Votes | % |
|---|---|---|---|
| Democratic | Cecil R. King (incumbent) | 194,782 | 100.0 |
| Turnout | | | |
| Democratic hold | | | |

1950 United States House of Representatives elections in California
| Party | Candidate | Votes | % |
|---|---|---|---|
| Democratic | Cecil R. King (incumbent) | 166,334 | 100.0 |
| Turnout | | | |
| Democratic hold | | | |

1952 United States House of Representatives elections in California
| Party | Candidate | Votes | % |
|---|---|---|---|
| Democratic | Cecil R. King (incumbent) | 114,650 | 54.6 |
| Republican | Robert H. Finch | 92,587 | 44.1 |
| Progressive | Loyd C. Seelinger | 2,738 | 1.3 |
| Total votes | | 209,975 | 100.0 |
| Turnout | | | |
| Democratic hold | | | |

1954 United States House of Representatives elections in California
| Party | Candidate | Votes | % |
|---|---|---|---|
| Democratic | Cecil R. King (incumbent) | 97,828 | 60.1 |
| Republican | Robert H. Finch | 64,967 | 39.9 |
| Total votes | | 162,795 | 100.0 |
| Turnout | | | |
| Democratic hold | | | |

1956 United States House of Representatives elections in California
| Party | Candidate | Votes | % |
|---|---|---|---|
| Democratic | Cecil R. King (incumbent) | 157,270 | 64.9 |
| Republican | Charles A. Franklin | 84,900 | 35.1 |
| Total votes | | 242,170 | 100.0 |
| Turnout | | | |
| Democratic hold | | | |

1958 United States House of Representatives elections in California
| Party | Candidate | Votes | % |
|---|---|---|---|
| Democratic | Cecil R. King (incumbent) | 182,965 | 75.3 |
| Republican | Charles A. Franklin | 59,973 | 24.7 |
| Total votes | | 242,938 | 100.0 |
| Turnout | | | |
| Democratic hold | | | |

1960 United States House of Representatives elections in California
| Party | Candidate | Votes | % |
|---|---|---|---|
| Democratic | Cecil R. King (incumbent) | 206,620 | 67.7 |
| Republican | Tom Coffee | 98,510 | 32.3 |
| Total votes | | 305,130 | 100.0 |
| Turnout | | | |
| Democratic hold | | | |

1962 United States House of Representatives elections in California
| Party | Candidate | Votes | % |
|---|---|---|---|
| Democratic | Cecil R. King (incumbent) | 74,964 | 73.8 |
| Republican | Ted Bruinsma | 36,663 | 26.2 |
| Total votes | | 111,627 | 100.0 |
| Turnout | | | |
| Democratic hold | | | |

1964 United States House of Representatives elections in California
| Party | Candidate | Votes | % |
|---|---|---|---|
| Democratic | Cecil R. King (incumbent) | 95,640 | 67.7 |
| Republican | Robert Muncaster | 45,688 | 32.3 |
| Total votes | | 141,328 | 100.0 |
| Turnout | | | |
| Democratic hold | | | |

1966 United States House of Representatives elections in California
| Party | Candidate | Votes | % |
|---|---|---|---|
| Democratic | Cecil R. King (incumbent) | 76,962 | 60.8 |
| Republican | Don Cortum | 49,615 | 39.2 |
| Total votes | | 126,577 | 100.0 |
| Turnout | | | |
| Democratic hold | | | |

U.S. House of Representatives
| Preceded by Lee E. Geyer | Member of the U.S. House of Representatives from California's 17th congressional district 1942 - 1969 | Succeeded by Glenn M. Anderson |
