= California's 15th congressional district =

U.S. House district for California

Coordinates: 37°39′20″N 121°50′06″W

- Interactive map of district boundaries
- Representative: Kevin Mullin; D–South San Francisco
- Population (2025): 735,032
- Median household income: $150,871
- Ethnicity: 35.8% Asian; 28.5% White; 26.5% Hispanic; 4.6% Two or more races; 2.5% Black; 1.2% Pacific Islander Americans; 0.9% other
- Cook PVI: D+26

California's 15th congressional district is a congressional district in the U.S. state of California. The district is currently represented by Democrat Kevin Mullin.

Currently, the district includes most of San Mateo County and the southeast side of San Francisco. Cities in the district include Daly City, South San Francisco, San Bruno, Millbrae, Burlingame, Hillsborough, San Mateo, Foster City, San Carlos, Belmont, Redwood City, and East Palo Alto.

Prior to the 2022 United States House of Representatives elections, the district covered most of eastern and southwestern Alameda County as well as part of Contra Costa County. Cities and CDPs in the district included Castro Valley, Dublin, Hayward, Livermore, Pleasanton, Sunol, and Union City; most of San Ramon; and parts of Danville and Fremont. The new 15th district roughly corresponds to the old 14th district and vice versa.

== Recent election results from statewide races ==
=== 2023–2027 boundaries ===
Year	Office	Results
2008	President	Obama 75% - 25%
2010	Governor	Brown 68% - 29%
2010	Lt. Governor	Newsom 66% - 28%
2010	Secretary of State	Bowen 67% - 25%
2010	Attorney General	Harris 59% - 33%
2010	Treasurer	Lockyer 70% - 23%
2010	Controller	Chiang 68% - 24%
2012	President	Obama 76% - 24%
2014	Governor	Brown 78% - 22%
2016	President	Clinton 77% - 18%
2018	Governor	Newsom 76% - 24%
2018	Attorney General	Becerra 78% - 22%
2020	President	Biden 78% - 20%
2022	Senate (Reg.)	Padilla 77% - 23%
2022	Governor	Newsom 76% - 24%
2022	Lt. Governor	Kounalakis 75% - 25%
2022	Secretary of State	Weber 75% - 25%
2022	Attorney General	Bonta 75% - 25%
2022	Treasurer	Ma 75% - 25%
2022	Controller	Cohen 69% - 31%
2024	President	Harris 72% - 24%
2024	Senate (Reg.)	Schiff 73% - 27%

=== 2027–2033 boundaries ===
Year	Office	Results
2008	President	Obama 75% - 25%
2010	Governor	Brown 68% - 29%
2010	Lt. Governor	Newsom 66% - 28%
2010	Secretary of State	Bowen 67% - 25%
2010	Attorney General	Harris 59% - 33%
2010	Treasurer	Lockyer 70% - 23%
2010	Controller	Chiang 68% - 24%
2012	President	Obama 76% - 24%
2014	Governor	Brown 78% - 22%
2016	President	Clinton 77% - 18%
2018	Governor	Newsom 76% - 24%
2018	Attorney General	Becerra 78% - 22%
2020	President	Biden 78% - 20%
2022	Senate (Reg.)	Padilla 77% - 23%
2022	Governor	Newsom 76% - 24%
2022	Lt. Governor	Kounalakis 75% - 25%
2022	Secretary of State	Weber 75% - 25%
2022	Attorney General	Bonta 75% - 25%
2022	Treasurer	Ma 75% - 25%
2022	Controller	Cohen 69% - 31%
2024	President	Harris 72% - 24%
2024	Senate (Reg.)	Schiff 73% - 27%

== Composition ==
FIPS County Code	County	Seat	Population
75	San Francisco	San Francisco	808,988
81	San Mateo	Redwood City	737,888

Under the 2020 redistricting, California's 15th congressional district is located in the San Francisco Bay Area, encompassing the east coast of San Mateo County and the southeast side of the City and County of San Francisco. The area in San Mateo County includes the northern portions of the town of Atherton and city of Menlo Park; the cities of San Mateo, Daly City, South San Francisco, Redwood City, Burlingame, San Bruno, Millbrae, East Palo Alto, San Carlos, Foster City, Belmont, Brisbane; the towns of Hillsborough and Colma; and the census-designated places North Fair Oaks, Broadmoor, Highlands, Baywood Park, and Emerald Lake Hills. The area in San Francisco includes the neighborhoods of Crocker-Amazon, Excelsior, Little Hollywood, Mission Terrace, Oceanview, Outer Mission, Portola, and Visitacion Valley.

San Mateo County is split between this district and the 16th district. They are partitioned by the San Francisquito Creek, Menalto Ave, Willow Rd, S Perimeter Rd, W Perimeter Rd, Bay Rd, Marsh Rd, Middlefield Rd, Highway 82, Highway 84, Alameda de las Pulgas, Woodhill Dr, Farm Hill Blvd, The Loop Rd, Jefferson Ave, Summit Way, California Way, Junipero Serra Freeway, and Highway 35.

=== Cities and CDPs with 10,000 or more people ===
- San Francisco – 808,988
- San Mateo – 105,661
- Daly City – 100,007
- Redwood City – 84,292
- South San Francisco – 66,105
- San Bruno – 43,908
- Foster City – 33,805
- Menlo Park – 33,780
- Burlingame – 31,386
- East Palo Alto – 30,034
- San Carlos – 28,557
- Belmont – 28,335
- Millbrae – 23,216
- North Fair Oaks – 14,027
- Hillsborough – 11,387

=== 2.500 – 10,000 people ===
- Atherton – 7,188
- Brisbane – 4,851
- Broadmoor – 4,411
- Emerald Lake Hills – 4,406

== List of members representing the district ==
Member	Party	Dates	Cong ress	Electoral history	Counties
District created March 4, 1933
William I. Traeger (Los Angeles)	Republican	March 4, 1933 – January 3, 1935	73rd	Elected in 1932. Lost re-election.	1933–1963; Los Angeles
John M. Costello (Los Angeles)	Democratic	January 3, 1935 – January 3, 1945	74th 75th 76th 77th 78th	Elected in 1934. Re-elected in 1936. Re-elected in 1938. Re-elected in 1940. Re-elected in 1942. Lost renomination.	1933–1963; Los Angeles
Gordon L. McDonough (Los Angeles)	Republican	January 3, 1945 – January 3, 1963	79th 80th 81st 82nd 83rd 84th 85th 86th 87th	Elected in 1944. Re-elected in 1946. Re-elected in 1948. Re-elected in 1950. Re-elected in 1952. Re-elected in 1954. Re-elected in 1956. Re-elected in 1958. Re-elected in 1960. Lost re-election.	1933–1963; Los Angeles
John J. McFall (Manteca)	Democratic	January 3, 1963 – January 3, 1975	88th 89th 90th 91st 92nd 93rd	Redistricted from the 11th district and re-elected in 1962. Re-elected in 1964. Re-elected in 1966. Re-elected in 1968. Re-elected in 1970. Re-elected in 1972. Redistricted to the 14th district.	1963–1967; San Joaquin, Stanislaus
John J. McFall (Manteca)	Democratic	January 3, 1963 – January 3, 1975	88th 89th 90th 91st 92nd 93rd	Redistricted from the 11th district and re-elected in 1962. Re-elected in 1964. Re-elected in 1966. Re-elected in 1968. Re-elected in 1970. Re-elected in 1972. Redistricted to the 14th district.	1967–1973; Northeastern Merced, San Joaquin, Stanislaus
John J. McFall (Manteca)	Democratic	January 3, 1963 – January 3, 1975	88th 89th 90th 91st 92nd 93rd	Redistricted from the 11th district and re-elected in 1962. Re-elected in 1964. Re-elected in 1966. Re-elected in 1968. Re-elected in 1970. Re-elected in 1972. Redistricted to the 14th district.	1973–1975; Eastern Sacramento, San Joaquin, Stanislaus
Bernice F. Sisk (Fresno)	Democratic	January 3, 1975 – January 3, 1979	94th 95th	Redistricted from the 16th district and re-elected in 1974. Re-elected in 1976.	1975–1983; Western Fresno, Madera, Mariposa, Merced, Stanislaus
Tony Coelho (Merced)	Democratic	January 3, 1979 – June 15, 1989	96th 97th 98th 99th 100th 101st	Elected in 1978. Re-elected in 1980. Re-elected in 1982. Re-elected in 1984. Re-elected in 1986. Re-elected in 1988. Resigned.	1975–1983; Western Fresno, Madera, Mariposa, Merced, Stanislaus
Tony Coelho (Merced)	Democratic	January 3, 1979 – June 15, 1989	96th 97th 98th 99th 100th 101st	Elected in 1978. Re-elected in 1980. Re-elected in 1982. Re-elected in 1984. Re-elected in 1986. Re-elected in 1988. Resigned.	1983–1993; Western Fresno, Mariposa, Merced, Stanislaus
Vacant		June 15, 1989 – September 12, 1989	101st		1983–1993; Western Fresno, Mariposa, Merced, Stanislaus
Gary Condit (Ceres)	Democratic	September 12, 1989 – January 3, 1993	101st 102nd	Elected to finish Coelho's term. Re-elected in 1990. Redistricted to the 18th district.	1983–1993; Western Fresno, Mariposa, Merced, Stanislaus
Norman Mineta (San Jose)	Democratic	January 3, 1993 – October 10, 1995	103rd 104th	Redistricted from the 13th district and re-elected in 1992. Re-elected in 1994. Resigned to accept a position with Lockheed Martin.	1993–2003; Western Santa Clara, northern Santa Cruz
Vacant		October 10, 1995 – December 12, 1995	104th		1993–2003; Western Santa Clara, northern Santa Cruz
Tom Campbell (Campbell)	Republican	December 12, 1995 – January 3, 2001	104th 105th 106th	Elected to finish Mineta's term. Re-elected in 1996. Re-elected in 1998. Retired to run for U.S. Senator.	1993–2003; Western Santa Clara, northern Santa Cruz
Mike Honda (San Jose)	Democratic	January 3, 2001 – January 3, 2013	107th 108th 109th 110th 111th 112th	Elected in 2000. Re-elected in 2002. Re-elected in 2004. Re-elected in 2006. Re-elected in 2008. Re-elected in 2010. Redistricted to the 17th district.	1993–2003; Western Santa Clara, northern Santa Cruz
Mike Honda (San Jose)	Democratic	January 3, 2001 – January 3, 2013	107th 108th 109th 110th 111th 112th	Elected in 2000. Re-elected in 2002. Re-elected in 2004. Re-elected in 2006. Re-elected in 2008. Re-elected in 2010. Redistricted to the 17th district.	2003–2013 Western/northwestern Santa Clara
Eric Swalwell (Dublin)	Democratic	January 3, 2013 – January 3, 2023	113th 114th 115th 116th 117th	Elected in 2012. Re-elected in 2014. Re-elected in 2016. Re-elected in 2018. Re-elected in 2020. Redistricted to the 14th district.	2013–2023 Eastern/southern Alameda, southern Contra Costa
Kevin Mullin (South San Francisco)	Democratic	January 3, 2023 – present	118th 119th	Elected in 2022. Re-elected in 2024. Re-elected in 2026.	2023–present Eastern San Mateo, southern San Francisco

== Election results ==
=== 1932 ===
1932 United States House of Representatives elections in California
Party	Candidate	Votes	%
Republican	William I. Traeger	67,390	52.8
Democratic	John M. Costello	57,518	45.1
No party	Errol Shour (write-in)	2,721	2.1
Total votes		127,663	100.0
Turnout			
Republican win (new seat)			

=== 1934 ===
1934 United States House of Representatives elections in California
Party	Candidate	Votes	%
Democratic	John M. Costello	67,247	50.5
Republican	William I. Traeger (Incumbent)	65,858	49.5
Total votes		133,161	100.0
Turnout			
Democratic gain from Republican			

=== 1936 ===
1936 United States House of Representatives elections in California
Party	Candidate	Votes	%
Democratic	John M. Costello (Incumbent)	99,107	69.0
Republican	Ernest Sawyer	44,559	31.0
Total votes		143,718	100.0
Turnout			
Democratic hold			

=== 1938 ===
1938 United States House of Representatives elections in California
Party	Candidate	Votes	%
Democratic	John M. Costello (Incumbent)	83,086	60.1
Republican	O. D. Thomas	51,483	37.3
Communist	Emil Freed	2,951	2.1
Total votes		138,132	100.0
Turnout			
Democratic hold			

=== 1940 ===
1940 United States House of Representatives elections in California
Party	Candidate	Votes	%
Democratic	John M. Costello (Incumbent)	94,435	56.2
Republican	Norris Nelson	71,667	42.6
Communist	Emil Freed	2,004	1.2
Total votes		168,155	100.0
Turnout			
Democratic hold			

=== 1942 ===
1942 United States House of Representatives elections in California
Party	Candidate	Votes	%
Democratic	John M. Costello (Incumbent)	88,798	86.1
Prohibition	B. Tarkington Dowden	10,185	9.9
Communist	Philip Gardner	3,989	3.9
Total votes		103,094	100.0
Turnout			
Democratic hold			

=== 1944 ===
1944 United States House of Representatives elections in California
Party	Candidate	Votes	%
Republican	Gordon L. McDonough	100,305	56.6
Democratic	Hal Styles	73,655	41.6
Prohibition	Johannes Nielson-Lange	2,694	1.5
Total votes		177,081	100.0
Turnout			
Republican gain from Democratic			

=== 1946 ===
1946 United States House of Representatives elections in California
Party	Candidate	Votes	%
Republican	Gordon L. McDonough (Incumbent)	106,020	99.4
Turnout		106,628	
Republican hold			

=== 1948 ===
1948 United States House of Representatives elections in California
Party	Candidate	Votes	%
Republican	Gordon L. McDonough (Incumbent)	131,933	83.0
Progressive	Maynard Omerberg	27,007	17.0
Total votes		159,031	100.0
Turnout			
Republican hold			

=== 1950 ===
1950 United States House of Representatives elections in California
Party	Candidate	Votes	%
Republican	Gordon L. McDonough (Incumbent)	112,704	87.1
Progressive	Jeanne Cole	16,559	12.8
Total votes		129,352	100.0
Turnout			
Republican hold			

=== 1952 ===
1952 United States House of Representatives elections in California
Party	Candidate	Votes	%
Republican	Gordon L. McDonough (Incumbent)	142,545	99.7
Turnout		142,932	
Republican hold			

=== 1954 ===
1954 United States House of Representatives elections in California
Party	Candidate	Votes	%
Republican	Gordon L. McDonough (Incumbent)	77,651	56.9
Democratic	Frank O'Sullivan	58,785	43.1
Total votes		136,445	100.0
Turnout			
Republican hold			

=== 1956 ===
1956 United States House of Representatives elections in California
Party	Candidate	Votes	%
Republican	Gordon L. McDonough (Incumbent)	97,182	57.9
Democratic	Emery Petty	70,681	42.1
Total votes		167,865	100.0
Turnout			
Republican hold			

=== 1958 ===
1958 United States House of Representatives elections in California
Party	Candidate	Votes	%
Republican	Gordon L. McDonough (Incumbent)	77,267	52.0
Democratic	Emery Petty	71,192	48.0
Total votes		148,482	100.0
Turnout			
Republican hold			

=== 1960 ===
1960 United States House of Representatives elections in California
Party	Candidate	Votes	%
Republican	Gordon L. McDonough (Incumbent)	89,234	51.3
Democratic	Norman Martell	84,650	48.5
Total votes		174,035	100.0
Turnout			
Republican hold			

=== 1962 ===
1962 United States House of Representatives elections in California
Party	Candidate	Votes	%
Democratic	John J. McFall (Incumbent)	97,322	70
Republican	Clifford B. Bull	41,726	30
Total votes		139,048	100
Turnout			
Democratic hold			

=== 1964 ===
1964 United States House of Representatives elections in California
Party	Candidate	Votes	%
Democratic	John J. McFall (Incumbent)	109,560	70.9
Republican	Kenneth Gibson	44,977	29.1
Total votes		154,537	100.0
Turnout			
Democratic hold			

=== 1966 ===
1966 United States House of Representatives elections in California
Party	Candidate	Votes	%
Democratic	John J. McFall (Incumbent)	81,733	57
Republican	Sam Van Dyken	61,550	43
Total votes		143,283	100
Turnout			
Democratic hold			

=== 1968 ===
1968 United States House of Representatives elections in California
Party	Candidate	Votes	%
Democratic	John J. McFall (Incumbent)	85,761	53.8
Republican	Sam Van Dyken	73,685	46.2
Total votes		159,446	100.0
Turnout			
Democratic hold			

=== 1970 ===
1970 United States House of Representatives elections in California
Party	Candidate	Votes	%
Democratic	John J. McFall (Incumbent)	98,442	63.1
Republican	Sam Van Dyken	55,546	35.6
American Independent	Francis E. "Gill" Gillings	1,994	1.3
Total votes		155,982	100.0
Turnout			
Democratic hold			

=== 1972 ===
1972 United States House of Representatives elections in California
Party	Candidate	Votes	%
Democratic	John J. McFall (Incumbent)	145,273	100.0
Turnout			
Democratic hold			

=== 1974 ===
1974 United States House of Representatives elections in California
Party	Candidate	Votes	%
Democratic	Bernice F. Sisk (Incumbent)	80,205	72
Republican	Carol Harner	31,361	28
Total votes		111,566	100
Turnout			
Democratic hold			

=== 1976 ===
1976 United States House of Representatives elections in California
Party	Candidate	Votes	%
Democratic	Bernice F. Sisk (Incumbent)	92,735	72.2
Republican	Carol Harner	35,700	27.8
Total votes		128,435	100.0
Turnout			
Democratic hold			

=== 1978 ===
1978 United States House of Representatives elections in California
Party	Candidate	Votes	%
Democratic	Tony Coelho	75,212	60.1
Republican	Chris Patterakis	49,914	39.9
Total votes		125,126	100.0
Turnout			
Democratic hold			

=== 1980 ===
1980 United States House of Representatives elections in California
Party	Candidate	Votes	%
Democratic	Tony Coelho (Incumbent)	108,072	71.8
Republican	Ron Schwartz	37,895	25.2
Libertarian	Michael L. Pullen	4,524	3.0
Total votes		150,491	100.0
Turnout			
Democratic hold			

=== 1982 ===
1982 United States House of Representatives elections in California
Party	Candidate	Votes	%
Democratic	Tony Coelho (Incumbent)	86,022	63.7
Republican	Ed Bates	45,948	34.0
Libertarian	Stephen L. Gerringer	3,073	2.3
Total votes		135,043	100.0
Turnout			
Democratic hold			

=== 1984 ===
1984 United States House of Representatives elections in California
Party	Candidate	Votes	%
Democratic	Tony Coelho (Incumbent)	109,590	65.5
Republican	Carol Harner	54,730	32.7
Libertarian	Richard M. Harris	3,086	1.8
Total votes		167,406	100.0
Turnout			
Democratic hold			

=== 1986 ===
1986 United States House of Representatives elections in California
Party	Candidate	Votes	%
Democratic	Tony Coelho (Incumbent)	93,600	71.0
Republican	Carol Harner	35,793	27.2
Libertarian	Richard M. Harris	2,382	1.8
Total votes		131,775	100.0
Turnout			
Democratic hold			

=== 1988 ===
1988 United States House of Representatives elections in California
Party	Candidate	Votes	%
Democratic	Tony Coelho (Incumbent)	118,710	69.8
Republican	Carol Harner	47,957	28.2
Libertarian	Richard M. Harris	3,526	2.1
Total votes		170,193	100.0
Total votes		70,753	41.6
Turnout			
Democratic hold			

=== 1989 (Special) ===
1989 special election
Party	Candidate	Votes	%
Democratic	Gary Condit		57.1
Republican	Claire L. Berryhill		35.0
Republican	Robert J. Weimer		3.3
Republican	Cliff Burris		2.6
Libertarian	Roy Shrimp		0.9
Republican	Chris Patterakis		0.4
Republican	David M. "Dave" Williams		0.4
Republican	Jack E. McCoy		0.2
Total votes			100.0
Turnout			
Democratic hold			

=== 1990 ===
1990 United States House of Representatives elections in California
Party	Candidate	Votes	%
Democratic	Gary Condit (Incumbent)	97,147	66.2
Republican	Cliff Burris	49,634	33.8
Total votes		146,781	100.0
Turnout			
Democratic hold			

=== 1992 ===
1992 United States House of Representatives elections in California
Party	Candidate	Votes	%
Democratic	Norm Mineta (Incumbent)	168,617	63.5
Republican	Robert Wick	82,875	31.2
Libertarian	Duggan Dieterly	13,293	5.0
No party	Futrell (write-in)	585	0.2
Total votes		265,370	100.0
Turnout			
Democratic hold			

=== 1994 ===
1994 United States House of Representatives elections in California
Party	Candidate	Votes	%
Democratic	Norm Mineta (Incumbent)	119,921	59.90
Republican	Robert Wick	80,266	40.09
No party	Liu (write-in)	17	0.01
Total votes		200,204	100.0
Turnout			
Democratic hold			

=== 1995 (Special) ===
List of special elections to the United States House of Representatives in California
Party	Candidate	Votes	%
Republican	Tom Campbell	54,372	58.85
Democratic	Jerry Estruth	33,051	35.77
Independent	Linh Kieu Dao	4,922	5.33
Reform	Connor Vlakancic (write-in)	42	0.05
Total votes		92,387	100.00
Turnout			
Republican gain from Democratic			

=== 1996 ===
1996 United States House of Representatives elections in California
Party	Candidate	Votes	%
Republican	Tom Campbell (Incumbent)	132,737	58.6
Democratic	Dick Lane	79,048	34.9
Reform	Valli Sharpe-Geisler	6,230	2.7
Libertarian	Ed Wimmers	5,481	2.4
Natural Law	Bruce Currivan	3,372	1.4
Republican	Linh Dao (write-in)	9	0.0
Republican	Connor Vlakancic (write-in)	9	0.0
Total votes		226,886	100.0
Turnout			
Republican hold			

=== 1998 ===
1998 United States House of Representatives elections in California
Party	Candidate	Votes	%
Republican	Tom Campbell (Incumbent)	111,876	60.54
Democratic	Dick Lane	70,059	37.91
Natural Law	Frank Strutner	2,843	1.54
Republican	Constant Vlakancic (write-in)	8	0.00
Total votes		184,786	100.0
Turnout			
Republican hold			

=== 2000 ===
Party	Candidate	Votes	%
Democratic	Mike Honda	128,545	54.3
Republican	Jim Cunneen	99,866	42.2
Libertarian	Ed Wimmers	4,820	2.0
Natural Law	Douglas C. Gorney	3,591	1.5
No party	Phillip Kronzer (write-in)	82	0.0
Total votes		236,904	100.0
Turnout			
Democratic gain from Republican			

=== 2002 ===
2002 United States House of Representatives elections in California
Party	Candidate	Votes	%
Democratic	Mike Honda (Incumbent)	87,482	65.8
Republican	Linda Rae Hermann	41,251	31.0
Libertarian	Jeff Landauer	4,289	3.2
Total votes		133,022	100.0
Turnout			
Democratic hold			

=== 2004 ===
2004 United States House of Representatives elections in California
Party	Candidate	Votes	%
Democratic	Mike Honda (Incumbent)	154,385	72.1
Republican	Raymond Chukwu	59,953	27.9
Total votes		214,338	100.0
Turnout			
Democratic hold			

=== 2006 ===
2006 United States House of Representatives elections in California
Party	Candidate	Votes	%
Democratic	Mike Honda (Incumbent)	115,532	72.4
Republican	Raymond Chukwu	44,186	27.6
Total votes		186,718	100.0
Turnout			
Democratic hold			

=== 2008 ===
2008 United States House of Representatives elections in California
Party	Candidate	Votes	%
Democratic	Mike Honda (Incumbent)	170,977	71.66
Republican	Joyce Stoer Cordi	55,489	23.26
Green	Peter Myers	12,123	5.08
Total votes		238,589	100.0
Turnout			
Democratic hold			

=== 2010 ===
2010 United States House of Representatives elections in California
Party	Candidate	Votes	%
Democratic	Mike Honda (Incumbent)	126,147	67.60
Republican	Scott Kirkland	60,468	32.40
Total votes		186,615	100.00
Turnout			
Democratic hold			

=== 2012 ===
2012 United States House of Representatives elections in California
Party	Candidate	Votes	%
Democratic	Eric Swalwell	120,388	52.1
Democratic	Pete Stark (Incumbent)	110,646	47.9
Total votes		231,034	100.00
Democratic hold			

=== 2014 ===
2014 United States House of Representatives elections in California
Party	Candidate	Votes	%
Democratic	Eric Swalwell (Incumbent)	99,756	69.8
Republican	Hugh Bussell	43,150	30.2
Total votes		142,906	100.00
Democratic hold			

=== 2016 ===
2016 United States House of Representatives elections in California
Party	Candidate	Votes	%
Democratic	Eric Swalwell (Incumbent)	198,578	73.8
Republican	Danny R. Turner	70,619	26.2
Total votes		269,197	100
Democratic hold			

=== 2018 ===
2018 United States House of Representatives elections in California
Party	Candidate	Votes	%
Democratic	Eric Swalwell (Incumbent)	177,989	73.0
Republican	Rudy L. Peters Jr.	65,940	27.0
Total votes		243,929	100
Democratic hold			

=== 2020 ===
2020 United States House of Representatives elections in California
Party	Candidate	Votes	%
Democratic	Eric Swalwell (incumbent)	242,991	70.9
Republican	Alison Hayden	99,710	29.1
Total votes		342,701	100.0
Democratic hold			

=== 2022 ===
2022 United States House of Representatives elections in California
Party	Candidate	Votes	%
Democratic	Kevin Mullin	108,077	55.5
Democratic	David Canepa	86,797	44.5
Total votes		194,874	100.0
Democratic hold			

=== 2024 ===
2024 United States House of Representatives elections in California
Party	Candidate	Votes	%
Democratic	Kevin Mullin (incumbent)	211,648	73.1
Republican	Anna Cheng Kramer	77,896	26.9
Total votes		289,544	100.0
Democratic hold			

== See also ==
- List of United States congressional districts
- California's congressional districts
