= George F. Gillette =

American politician

Member of the California State Assembly from the 67th district
- In office January 5, 1931 - January 2, 1933
- Preceded by: Eleanor Miller
- Succeeded by: Cecil R. King

Personal details
- Born: May 9, 1878 Henry County, Missouri, US
- Died: March 7, 1944 (aged 65) California, US
- Party: Republican

Military service
- Branch/service: United States Army
- Battles/wars: Spanish–American War

George Franklin Gillette (May 9, 1878 – March 7, 1944) served in the California State Assembly for the 67th district from 1931 to 1933 and during the Spanish–American War he served in the United States Army. Born in Henry County, Missouri, Gillette died on March 7, 1944.
