= John J. McFall =

American politician (1918–2006)

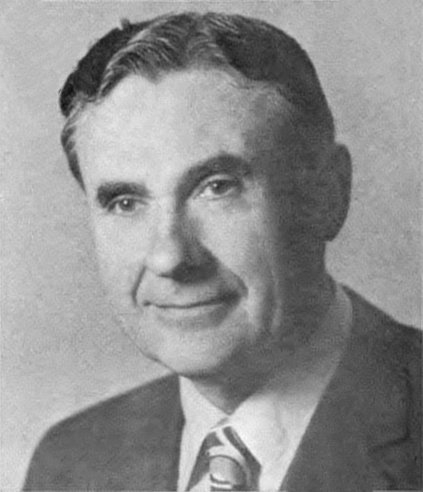
- McFall in 1975

House Majority Whip
- In office January 3, 1973 – January 3, 1977
- Leader: Tip O'Neill
- Preceded by: Tip O'Neill
- Succeeded by: John Brademas

Member of the U.S. House of Representatives from California
- In office January 3, 1957 – December 31, 1978
- Preceded by: J. Leroy Johnson
- Succeeded by: Norman D. Shumway
- Constituency: 11th district (1957–1963); 15th district (1963–1975); 14th district (1975–1978)

Member of the California Assembly
- In office 1951–1956

Mayor of Manteca
- In office 1949–1950

Personal details
- Born: John Joseph McFall; February 20, 1918 Buffalo, New York, U.S.
- Died: March 7, 2006 (aged 88) Alexandria, Virginia, U.S.
- Party: Democratic
- Spouse: Evelyn Anklam
- Children: 4
- Education: Modesto Junior College; University of California, Berkeley (BA, LLB)

Military service
- Branch/service: United States Army
- Years of service: 1942–1946
- Rank: Sergeant
- Unit: Security Intelligence Corps
- John J. McFall's voice McFall speaks against a veto of the Tax Reduction Act of 1975; Recorded March 28, 1975

John Joseph McFall (February 20, 1918 – March 7, 2006) was an American Democratic member of the United States House of Representatives, representing the state of California, rising to the position of House Majority Whip.

== Early life and career ==
McFall was born in Buffalo, New York, and his family moved to Manteca, California, where he attended school. He attended Manteca High School and graduated from Modesto Junior College in 1936. He then graduated from the University of California, Berkeley in 1938, and obtained his law degree from the UC Berkeley School of Law in 1941. His career as an attorney was interrupted by service in the Army Security Intelligence Corps from 1942 to 1946, where he was stationed in the United States and became a sergeant.

== Politics ==
In 1948, McFall became a Manteca councilman. He was elected to the state assembly in 1951 and served there until his election to the United States Congress in 1956.

=== Congress ===
McFall served eleven terms in Congress, but lost his bid for re-election to a 12th term in 1978 and resigned on December 31, 1978.

== Koreagate ==
Congressman McFall, along with other elected officials, was reprimanded for his role in the influence peddling scandal that came to be known as Koreagate.

== Personal life ==
He married Evelyn A.M. Anklam McFall in 1950. The couple had four children. In 1978 he retired to Alexandria, Virginia. After leaving Congress, he became a lobbyist for railroad interests.

== Death ==
He died March 7, 2006, from complications of a broken hip and Parkinson's disease.

== Electoral history ==
John J. McFall electoral history

1956 United States House of Representatives elections in California
Party	Candidate	Votes	%
Democratic	John J. McFall	70,630	53.1
Republican	Justin L. Johnson (Incumbent)	62,448	46.9
Total votes		133,078	100.0
Turnout			
Democratic gain from Republican			

1958 United States House of Representatives elections in California
Party	Candidate	Votes	%
Democratic	John J. McFall (Incumbent)	86,924	69.3
Republican	Frederick S. Van Dyke	38,427	30.7
Total votes		125,351	100.0
Turnout			
Democratic hold			

1960 United States House of Representatives elections in California
Party	Candidate	Votes	%
Democratic	John J. McFall (Incumbent)	97,368	65.4
Republican	Clifford B. Bull	51,473	34.6
Total votes		148,841	100.0
Turnout			
Democratic hold			

1962 United States House of Representatives elections in California
Party	Candidate	Votes	%
Democratic	John J. McFall (Incumbent)	97,322	70
Republican	Clifford B. Bull	41,726	30
Total votes		139,048	100
Turnout			
Democratic hold			

1964 United States House of Representatives elections in California
Party	Candidate	Votes	%
Democratic	John J. McFall (Incumbent)	109,560	70.9
Republican	Kenneth Gibson	44,977	29.1
Total votes		154,537	100.0
Turnout			
Democratic hold			

1966 United States House of Representatives elections in California
Party	Candidate	Votes	%
Democratic	John J. McFall (Incumbent)	81,733	57
Republican	Sam Van Dyken	61,550	43
Total votes		143,283	100
Turnout			
Democratic hold			

1968 United States House of Representatives elections in California
Party	Candidate	Votes	%
Democratic	John J. McFall (Incumbent)	85,761	53.8
Republican	Sam Van Dyken	73,685	46.2
Total votes		159,446	100.0
Turnout			
Democratic hold			

1970 United States House of Representatives elections in California
Party	Candidate	Votes	%
Democratic	John J. McFall (Incumbent)	98,442	63.1
Republican	Sam Van Dyken	55,546	35.6
American Independent	Francis E. "Gill" Gillings	1,994	1.3
Total votes		155,982	100.0
Turnout			
Democratic hold			

1972 United States House of Representatives elections in California
Party	Candidate	Votes	%
Democratic	John J. McFall (Incumbent)	145,273	100.0
Turnout			
Democratic hold			

1974 United States House of Representatives elections in California
Party	Candidate	Votes	%
Democratic	John J. McFall (Incumbent)	101,932	70.9
Republican	Charles M. "Chuck" Gibson	34,679	24.1
American Independent	Roger A. Blaine	7,367	4.9
Total votes		143,978	100.0
Turnout			
Democratic hold			

1976 United States House of Representatives elections in California
Party	Candidate	Votes	%
Democratic	John J. McFall (Incumbent)	123,285	72.5
Republican	Roger A. Blaine	46,674	27.5
Total votes		169,959	100.0
Turnout			
Democratic hold			

1978 United States House of Representatives elections in California
Party	Candidate	Votes	%
Republican	Norman D. Shumway (Incumbent)	95,962	53.4
Democratic	John J. McFall (Incumbent)	76,602	42.6
American Independent	George Darold Waldron	7,163	4.0
Total votes		179,727	100.0
Turnout			
Republican gain from Democratic			

== See also ==
- List of federal political scandals in the United States
- List of United States representatives expelled, censured, or reprimanded

U.S. House of Representatives
Preceded by J. Leroy Johnson	Member of the U.S. House of Representatives from California's 11th congressional district 1957–1963	Succeeded by J. Arthur Younger
Preceded by Gordon L. McDonough	Member of the U.S. House of Representatives from California's 15th congressional district 1963–1975	Succeeded by Bernice F. Sisk
Preceded by Tip O'Neill	House Majority Whip; 1973–1977	Succeeded by John Brademas
Preceded by Jerome R. Waldie	Member of the U.S. House of Representatives from California's 14th congressional district 1975–1979	Succeeded by Norman D. Shumway
