= Bob Wilson (politician) =

American politician in California (1916–1999)

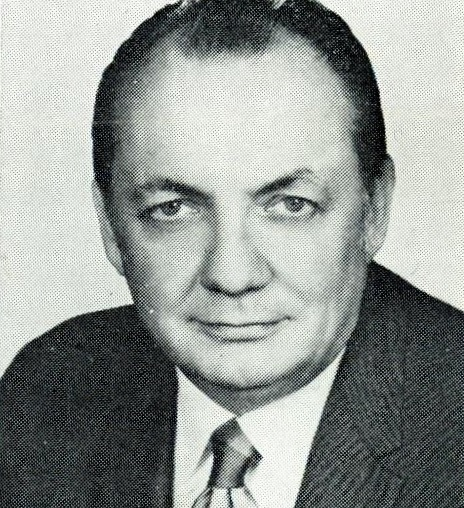

Member of the U.S. House of Representatives from California
- In office January 3, 1953 – January 3, 1981
- Preceded by: Clinton D. McKinnon (redistricting)
- Succeeded by: Bill Lowery
- Constituency: 30th district (1953–63); 36th district (1963–73); 40th district (1973–75); 41st district (1975–81)

Personal details
- Born: Robert Carlton Wilson; April 5, 1916 Calexico, California, U.S.
- Died: August 12, 1999 (aged 83) Chula Vista, California, U.S.
- Resting place: Fort Rosecrans National Cemetery; San Diego, California, U.S.
- Party: Republican
- Education: San Diego State University

Robert Carlton Wilson (April 5, 1916 – August 12, 1999) was an American politician, who served 14 terms as a member of the United States House of Representatives from California from 1953 to 1981. He was a member of the Republican Party.

== Biography ==
Wilson was born on April 5, 1916, in Calexico, California. He attended San Diego State College (now San Diego State University) and Otis Art Institute (now Otis College of Art and Design).

=== Military service ===
He served in World War II stateside in the Army commissary from 1940 to 1945.

After the war, he was in the Marine Corps Reserve, rising to the rank of colonel, and was a partner in two advertising agencies.

=== Campaign for Congress ===
Wilson first became involved in politics campaigning for Dwight D. Eisenhower in 1952. He was recruited to run in the newly created 30th District, based in San Diego, California. When Wilson phoned his wife, Jean Bryant Wilson, with the news he was selected by the Republicans to run, she laughed saying "You a Congressman?" He was elected amid Eisenhower's gigantic landslide that year.

=== Tenure in Congress ===
Wilson was reelected 13 times, rarely facing serious opposition as San Diego was a Republican stronghold. His campaigns featured anti-communism themes, stressing the importance of a strong military. He also opposed high taxes, championing rugged individualism instead. While in Congress he became a major spokesman for the defense industry and played a large role in the development of a military presence in San Diego. From 1959 until his retirement he was a member of the House Armed Services Committee. From 1968 to his retirement he served as chair of the National Republican Congressional Committee. He was well-known and popular in San Diego, and would blanket his district with pot holders and other gifts with his name on it during election time. Several households still have the 40-page Bob Wilson Barbecue Cook Book he sent out. While in office, he patented a "Smack-Its", a table-top tetherball game. Wilson voted in favor of the Civil Rights Acts of 1957, 1960, 1964, and 1968, and the Voting Rights Act of 1965, while Wilson voted present on the 24th Amendment to the U.S. Constitution.

In 1979, on the legislative issue of spousal rape, Wilson is reported as having asked, "If you can't rape your wife, who can you rape?"

In 1980, Wilson decided not to run for a 15th term. He served as co-chairman of American Freedom Coalition with Congressman Richard Ichord. He was a member of the California Society of the Sons of the American Revolution.

=== Death and burial ===
Wilson died on August 12, 1999, in Chula Vista, California, at the age of 83. He is buried at Fort Rosecrans National Cemetery in San Diego.

== Electoral history ==
Bob Wilson electoral history

1952 United States House of Representatives elections in California
Party	Candidate	Votes	%
Republican	Bob Wilson	121,322	59.6
Democratic	De Graff Austin	82,311	40.4
Total votes		203,633	100.0
Republican win (new seat)			

1954 United States House of Representatives elections in California
Party	Candidate	Votes	%
Republican	Bob Wilson (Incumbent)	94,623	60.4
Democratic	Ross T. McIntire	61,994	39.6
Total votes		156,617	100.0
Republican hold			

1956 United States House of Representatives elections in California
Party	Candidate	Votes	%
Republican	Bob Wilson (Incumbent)	142,753	66.7
Democratic	George A. Cheney	71,112	33.3
Total votes		213,865	100.0
Republican hold			

1958 United States House of Representatives elections in California
Party	Candidate	Votes	%
Republican	Bob Wilson (Incumbent)	112,290	52.7
Democratic	Lionel Van Deerlin	90,641	47.3
Total votes		202,931	100.0
Republican hold			

1960 United States House of Representatives elections in California
Party	Candidate	Votes	%
Republican	Bob Wilson (Incumbent)	158,679	59.3
Democratic	Walter Wencke	108,882	40.7
Total votes		267,561	100.0
Republican hold			

1962 United States House of Representatives elections in California
Party	Candidate	Votes	%
Republican	Bob Wilson (Incumbent)	91,626	61.8
Democratic	William C. Godfrey	56,637	38.2
Total votes		148,263	100.0
Republican hold			

1964 United States House of Representatives elections in California
Party	Candidate	Votes	%
Republican	Bob Wilson (Incumbent)	105,346	59.1
Democratic	Quintin Whelan	73,034	40.9
Total votes		178,380	100.0
Republican hold			

1966 United States House of Representatives elections in California
Party	Candidate	Votes	%
Republican	Bob Wilson (Incumbent)	119,274	72.9
Democratic	Don Lindgren	44,365	27.1
Total votes		163,639	100.0
Republican hold			

1968 United States House of Representatives elections in California
Party	Candidate	Votes	%
Republican	Bob Wilson (Incumbent)	147,772	71.6
Democratic	Don Lindgren	58,578	28.4
Total votes		206,350	100.0
Republican hold			

1970 United States House of Representatives elections in California
Party	Candidate	Votes	%
Republican	Bob Wilson (Incumbent)	132,446	71.5
Democratic	Daniel K. Hostetter	44,841	24.2
Peace and Freedom	Walter H. Koppelman	5,139	2.8
American Independent	Orville J. Davis	2,723	1.5
Total votes		185,149	100.0
Republican hold			

1972 United States House of Representatives elections in California
Party	Candidate	Votes	%
Republican	Bob Wilson (Incumbent)	153,648	67.8
Democratic	Frank Caprio	68,771	30.3
American Independent	Fritjof Thygeson	4,294	1.9
Total votes		226,713	100.0
Republican hold			

1974 United States House of Representatives elections in California
Party	Candidate	Votes	%
Republican	Bob Wilson (Incumbent)	93,461	54.5
Democratic	Colleen Marie O'Connor	73,954	43.0
American Independent	Robert W. Franson	4,312	2.5
Total votes		171,727	100.0
Republican hold			

1976 United States House of Representatives elections in California
Party	Candidate	Votes	%
Republican	Bob Wilson (Incumbent)	128,784	57.7
Democratic	King Golden, Jr.	94,590	42.3
Total votes		223,374	100.0
Republican hold			

1978 United States House of Representatives elections in California
Party	Candidate	Votes	%
Republican	Bob Wilson (Incumbent)	107,685	58.1
Democratic	King Golden, Jr.	77,540	41.9
Total votes		185,225	100.0
Republican hold			

== See also ==
- Nugan Hand Bank

U.S. House of Representatives
Preceded by District created	Member of the U.S. House of Representatives from California's 30th congressional district January 3, 1953 – January 3, 1963	Succeeded by Edward R. Roybal (moved to 36th district)
Preceded by District created (moved from 30th district)	Member of the U.S. House of Representatives from California's 36th congressional district January 3, 1963 – January 3, 1973	Succeeded by William M. Ketchum (moved to 40th district)
Preceded by District created (moved from 36th district)	Member of the U.S. House of Representatives from California's 40th congressional district January 3, 1973 – January 3, 1975	Succeeded by Andrew J. Hinshaw (moved to 41st district)
Preceded by Lionel Van Deerlin (moved from 40th district)	Member of the U.S. House of Representatives from California's 41st congressional district January 3, 1975 – January 3, 1981	Succeeded by Bill Lowery
