= Gordon L. McDonough =

American politician

Gordon McDonough
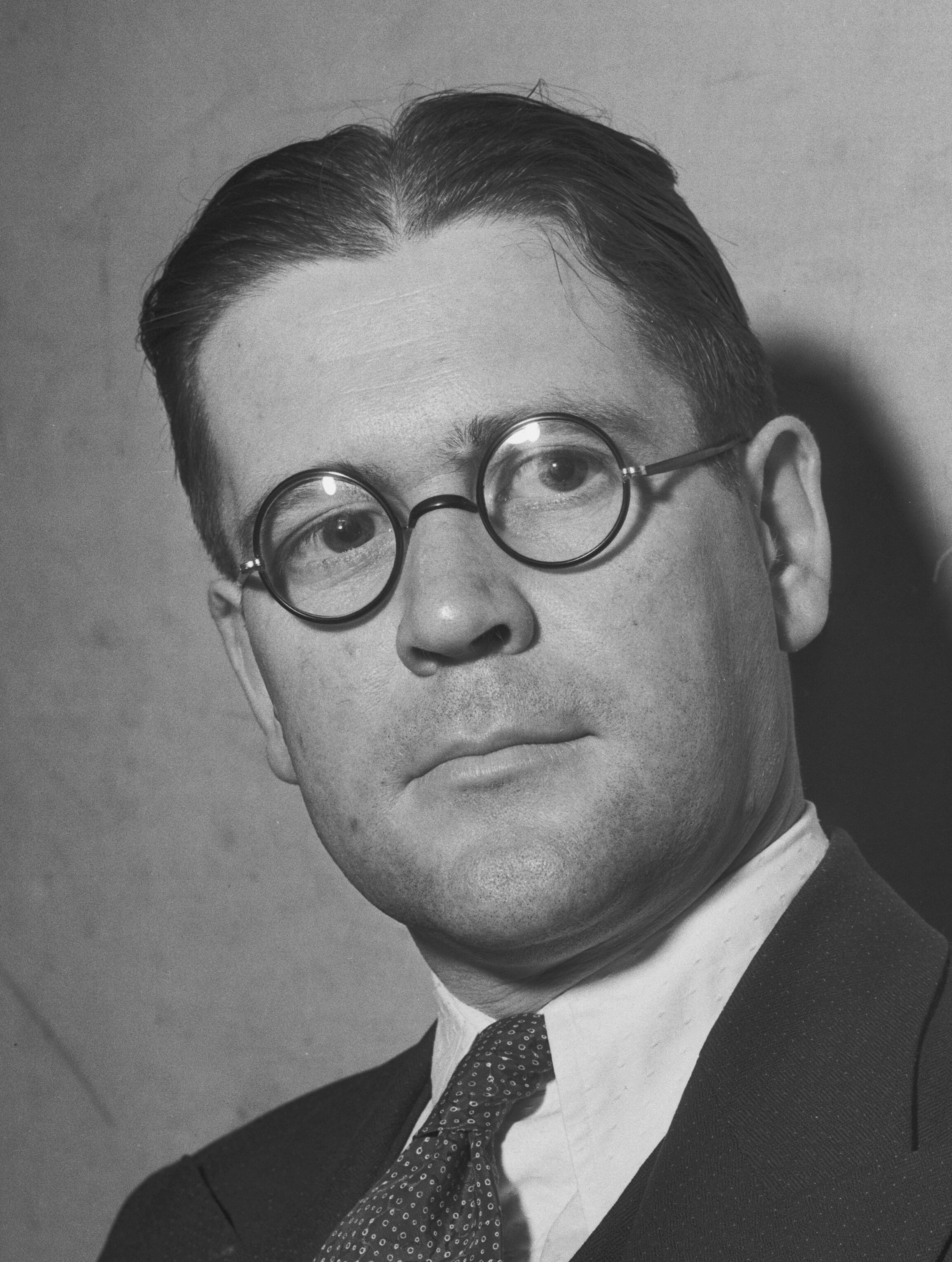
- McDonough c. 1930s

Member of the U.S. House of Representatives from California's 15th district
- In office January 3, 1945 – January 3, 1963
- Preceded by: John M. Costello
- Succeeded by: Edward R. Roybal (redistricting)

Chair of Los Angeles County
- In office December 2, 1941 – December 8, 1942
- Preceded by: Roger W. Jessup
- Succeeded by: John Anson Ford

Member of the Los Angeles County Board of Supervisors from the 2nd District
- In office January 7, 1934 – 1944
- Preceded by: Frank L. Shaw
- Succeeded by: Leonard J. Roach

Personal details
- Born: Gordon Leo McDonough; January 2, 1895 Buffalo, New York, United States
- Died: June 25, 1968 (aged 73) Bethesda, Maryland, United States
- Resting place: Holy Cross Mausoleum, Los Angeles, California
- Party: Republican
- Spouse: Catherine Ann McNeil
- Children: 7

Gordon Leo McDonough (January 2, 1895 – June 25, 1968) was an American politician who served nine terms as a U.S. representative from California from 1945 to 1963.

== Early life and career ==
Born in Buffalo, New York, McDonough moved with his parents to Emporium, Pennsylvania, in 1898. He attended the public schools and graduated from the high school there.

He engaged as an industrial chemist in Emporium from 1915 to 1918. He moved to Los Angeles, California and resumed his former occupation, from 1918 to 1933. He served on the Los Angeles County Board of Supervisors from 1933 to 1944, serving as County chair for one year.

== Congress ==
McDonough was elected as a Republican to the Seventy-ninth and to the eight succeeding Congresses (January 3, 1945 – January 3, 1963). In 1962 California gained eight U.S. House seats. To boost the chances for re-election for Republican colleagues and opportunities for potential new Republican House members, McDonough ran in a newly drawn but unfavorable district against Democrat Edward Roybal, a member of the Los Angeles City Council. Roybal defeated McDonough to become the first Latino American member of Congress from California in 80 years.

McDonough voted in favor of the Civil Rights Acts of 1957 and 1960, as well as the 24th Amendment to the U.S. Constitution.

== Private life ==
He was married to Catherine McNeil and they raised seven children.

McDonough appeared on the Groucho Marx game show You Bet Your Life on January 4, 1950.

== Death ==
He died in Bethesda, Maryland, June 25, 1968, and was interred in Holy Cross Mausoleum, Los Angeles, California.

== Electoral history ==
1944 United States House of Representatives elections in California
Party	Candidate	Votes	%
Republican	Gordon L. McDonough	100,305	56.6
Democratic	Hal Styles	73,655	41.6
Prohibition	Johannes Nielson-Lange	2,694	1.5
Total votes		177,081	100.0
Turnout			
Republican gain from Democratic			

1946 United States House of Representatives elections in California
Party	Candidate	Votes	%
Republican	Gordon L. McDonough (Incumbent)	106,020	99.4
Turnout		106,628	
Republican hold			

1948 United States House of Representatives elections in California
Party	Candidate	Votes	%
Republican	Gordon L. McDonough (Incumbent)	131,933	83.0
Progressive	Maynard Omerberg	27,007	17.0
Total votes		159,031	100.0
Turnout			
Republican hold			

1950 United States House of Representatives elections in California
Party	Candidate	Votes	%
Republican	Gordon L. McDonough (Incumbent)	112,704	87.1
Progressive	Jeanne Cole	16,559	12.8
Total votes		129,352	100.0
Turnout			
Republican hold			

1952 United States House of Representatives elections in California
Party	Candidate	Votes	%
Republican	Gordon L. McDonough (Incumbent)	142,545	99.7
Turnout		142,932	
Republican hold			

1954 United States House of Representatives elections in California
Party	Candidate	Votes	%
Republican	Gordon L. McDonough (Incumbent)	77,651	56.9
Democratic	Frank O'Sullivan	58,785	43.1
Total votes		136,445	100.0
Turnout			
Republican hold			

1956 United States House of Representatives elections in California
Party	Candidate	Votes	%
Republican	Gordon L. McDonough (Incumbent)	97,182	57.9
Democratic	Emery Petty	70,681	42.1
Total votes		167,865	100.0
Turnout			
Republican hold			

1958 United States House of Representatives elections in California
Party	Candidate	Votes	%
Republican	Gordon L. McDonough (Incumbent)	77,267	52.0
Democratic	Emery Petty	71,192	48.0
Total votes		148,482	100.0
Turnout			
Republican hold			

1960 United States House of Representatives elections in California
Party	Candidate	Votes	%
Republican	Gordon L. McDonough (Incumbent)	89,234	51.3
Democratic	Norman Martell	84,650	48.5
Total votes		174,035	100.0
Turnout			
Republican hold			

1962 United States House of Representatives elections in California
Party	Candidate	Votes	%
Democratic	Edward R. Roybal	69,008	56.5
Republican	Gordon L. McDonough (Incumbent)	53,104	43.5
Total votes		122,112	100.0
Democratic gain from Republican			

U.S. House of Representatives
Preceded by John M. Costello	Member of the U.S. House of Representatives from California's 15th congressional district 1945–1963	Succeeded by John J. McFall
