= Lionel Van Deerlin =

American journalist

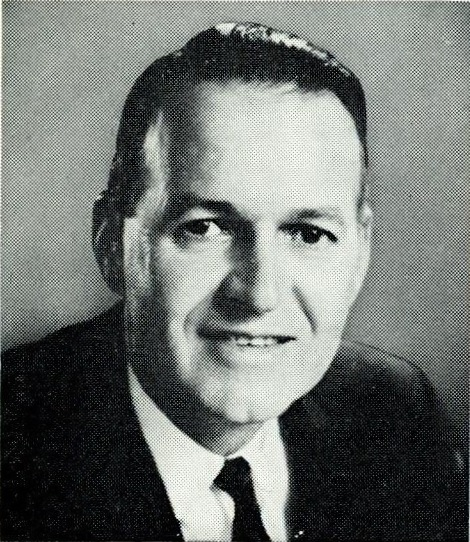

Member of the U.S. House of Representatives from California
- In office January 3, 1963 – January 3, 1981
- Preceded by: Constituency established
- Succeeded by: Duncan L. Hunter
- Constituency: 37th district (1963–73); 41st district (1973–75); 42nd district (1975–81)

Personal details
- Born: Lionel Lathrop Van Deerlin; July 25, 1914 Los Angeles, California, U.S.
- Died: May 17, 2008 (aged 93) San Diego, California, U.S.
- Party: Democratic
- Education: University of Southern California (B.A., journalism, 1937)
- Occupation: Journalist, newspaper columnist

Military service
- Branch/service: United States Army
- Years of service: 1941–1945
- Rank: Staff Sergeant
- Unit: Field Artillery
- Battles/wars: World War II Mediterranean Theater

Lionel Lathrop Van Deerlin (July 25, 1914 – May 17, 2008) was an American journalist and politician who served nine terms as a Democratic United States Representative from California from 1963 to 1981, representing a San Diego area district.

== Biography ==
Born in Los Angeles, California, Van Deerlin graduated from Oceanside High School in Oceanside, California, in 1933 and earned a Bachelor of Arts in journalism in 1937 from the University of Southern California, where he was editor of the Daily Trojan.

Van Deerlin served in the United States Army for four years during World War II in the Field Artillery, on the staff of Stars and Stripes newspaper (Mediterranean), and in the overseas service in Italy. He was a staff sergeant. After the war, he was a journalist in Minneapolis, Minnesota and Baltimore, Maryland.

Van Deerlin moved to San Diego, where he first ran unsuccessfully for Congress in 1952. He became city editor of the old San Diego Daily Journal, which was founded by Clinton D. McKinnon. Later, Van Deerlin became news director of XETV in Tijuana-San Diego, at that time San Diego's ABC affiliate, and later moved to NBC affiliate KFSD-AM-FM-TV. After a second unsuccessful bid for Congress in 1958, he returned to XETV as a newscaster and news director.

=== Congress ===
Van Deerlin was elected to Congress in 1962 from the newly created 37th District, becoming the first Democrat to represent a San Diego–based district in Congress since Clinton D. McKinnon left office in 1953. He was re-elected eight times from this district, which was renumbered the 41st in 1972 and the 42nd in 1974. As chairman of the House Subcommittee on Communications, Van Deerlin encouraged competition in the telecommunications industry by conducting hearings that led to the breakup of AT&T. He supported a broad interpretation of First Amendment rights for broadcasters.

In 1980, Van Deerlin's Republican opponent was attorney Duncan Hunter. Hunter's campaign was initially considered a longshot, but he gained considerable traction by painting Van Deerlin as weak on defense. This caught Van Deerlin flat-footed. Besides using the "weak on defense" label in a solid military-based economy that is omnipresent in the San Diego metropolitan area, Hunter's activities (such as helping the poor receive legal assistance) in the community were also an asset. By the time Van Deerlin began to take Hunter seriously (he hadn't really had to campaign since his first race), it was too late, and Hunter narrowly defeated him. Since then, Democrats have only cracked the 40 percent barrier twice in the district, which is now numbered as the 50th District after being redrawn several times since Van Deerlin's defeat.

=== Later career and death ===
Van Deerlin was a professor emeritus at San Diego State University and had a weekly column (every Thursday) in The San Diego Union-Tribune. The Lionel Van Deerlin Endowed Chair in Communications at San Diego State was named in his honor.

Van Deerlin died in 2008 at age 93 at his home in San Diego.

== Quote ==
Twenty-five years ago in Congress you not only trusted the opposing party, you enjoyed their company. Today, they hardly speak. Speech before the Osher Forum, broadcast by UC-TV, April 23, 2004

== Electoral history ==
1962 United States House of Representatives elections in California
Party	Candidate	Votes	%
Democratic	Lionel Van Deerlin (Incumbent)	63,821	51.4
Republican	Dick Wilson	60,460	48.6
Total votes		124,281	100.0
Democratic win (new seat)			

1964 United States House of Representatives elections in California
Party	Candidate	Votes	%
Democratic	Lionel Van Deerlin (Incumbent)	85,624	58.2
Republican	Dick Wilson	61,373	41.8
Total votes		146,997	100.0
Democratic hold			

1966 United States House of Representatives elections in California
Party	Candidate	Votes	%
Democratic	Lionel Van Deerlin (Incumbent)	80,060	61.2
Republican	Samuel S. Vener	50,817	38.8
Total votes		130,877	100.0
Democratic hold			

1968 United States House of Representatives elections in California
Party	Candidate	Votes	%
Democratic	Lionel Van Deerlin (Incumbent)	95,591	64.7
Republican	Mike Schaefer	52,212	35.3
Total votes		147,803	100.0
Democratic hold			

1970 United States House of Representatives elections in California
Party	Candidate	Votes	%
Democratic	Lionel Van Deerlin (Incumbent)	93,952	72.1
Republican	James B. Kuhn	31,968	24.5
American Independent	Faye B. Brice	2,962	2.3
Peace and Freedom	Fritjof Thygeson	1,386	1.1
Total votes		130,268	100.0
Democratic hold			

1972 United States House of Representatives elections in California
Party	Candidate	Votes	%
Democratic	Lionel Van Deerlin (Incumbent)	115,634	74.1
Republican	D. Richard "Dick" Kau	40,514	25.9
Total votes		156,148	100.0
Democratic win (new seat)			

1974 United States House of Representatives elections in California
Party	Candidate	Votes	%
Democratic	Lionel Van Deerlin (Incumbent)	69,746	69.9
Republican	Wes Marden	30,058	30.1
Total votes		99,804	100.0
Democratic hold			

1976 United States House of Representatives elections in California
Party	Candidate	Votes	%
Democratic	Lionel Van Deerlin (Incumbent)	103,062	76.0
Republican	Wes Marden	32,565	24.0
Total votes		135,627	100.0
Democratic hold			

1978 United States House of Representatives elections in California
Party	Candidate	Votes	%
Democratic	Lionel Van Deerlin (Incumbent)	85,126	73.7
Republican	Lawrence C. Mattera	30,319	26.3
Total votes		115,445	100.0
Democratic hold			

1980 United States House of Representatives elections in California
Party	Candidate	Votes	%
Republican	Duncan Hunter	79,713	53.3
Democratic	Lionel Van Deerlin (Incumbent)	69,936	46.7
Total votes		149,649	100.0
Republican gain from Democratic			

U.S. House of Representatives
New district	Member of the U.S. House of Representatives from California's 37th congressional district 1963–1973	Succeeded by Yvonne Brathwaite Burke
New district	Member of the U.S. House of Representatives from California's 41st congressional district 1973–1975	Succeeded by Bob Wilson
Preceded by Clair Burgener	Member of the U.S. House of Representatives from California's 42nd congressional district 1975–1981	Succeeded by Duncan Hunter
