= John E. Moss =

American politician

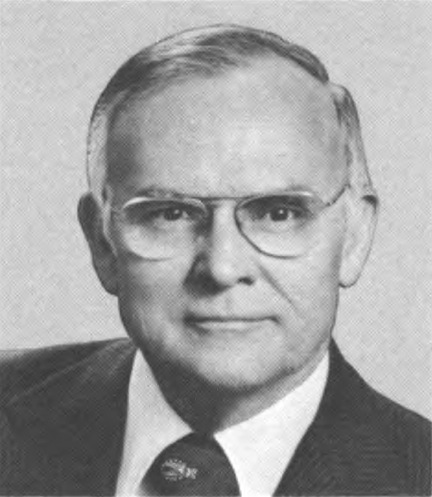

Member of the U.S. House of Representatives from California's 3rd district
- In office January 3, 1953 – December 31, 1978
- Preceded by: Justin L. Johnson
- Succeeded by: Bob Matsui

Personal details
- Born: John Emerson Moss; April 13, 1915 Hiawatha, Utah, U.S.
- Died: December 5, 1997 (aged 82) San Francisco, California, U.S.
- Resting place: Odd Fellows Lawn Cemetery and Mausoleum, Sacramento, California
- Party: Democratic

John Emerson Moss (April 13, 1915 – December 5, 1997) was an American World War II veteran and politician of the Democratic Party, noted for his championing of the federal Freedom of Information Act (FOIA) through multiple sessions of the United States House of Representatives where he served from 1953 to 1978.

== Biography ==
Moss was born in Hiawatha, Utah, in 1915, and moved with his family to Sacramento, California, in 1923 where he attended public school and Sacramento Junior College. He held various sales, credit executive, and retail jobs from 1938 and 1943. In 1935 he married Jean Kueny, the daughter of Joseph and Winnefred (née West) Kueny of Galt, California. Together they had two daughters, Jennifer Afton and Allison Effie. In 1938 he joined the California Democratic State Central committee where he remained until 1980. He died in San Francisco, California, in 1997.

Moss served in the United States Navy during World War II and was elected to the California State Legislature in 1949, where he served as the Democratic floor leader until 1952.

== U.S. House of Representatives ==
Moss served in the US House of Representatives for California's 3rd congressional district for 13 terms from 1953 until he retired in 1978. He was nominated by both the Democratic and Republican parties in 1958 and ran unopposed in 1960. Moss earned the distinction of never being defeated in an election for public office.

Moss held the chair for the following subcommittees in the House of Representatives:

- Special Subcommittee on Government Information
- Foreign Operations and Government Information Subcommittee of the House Government Operations Committee
- Commerce and Finance and Oversight and Investigations Subcommittees of the Committee on Interstate and Foreign Commerce
- Oversight and Investigations Subcommittee, Committee on Interstate and Foreign Commerce

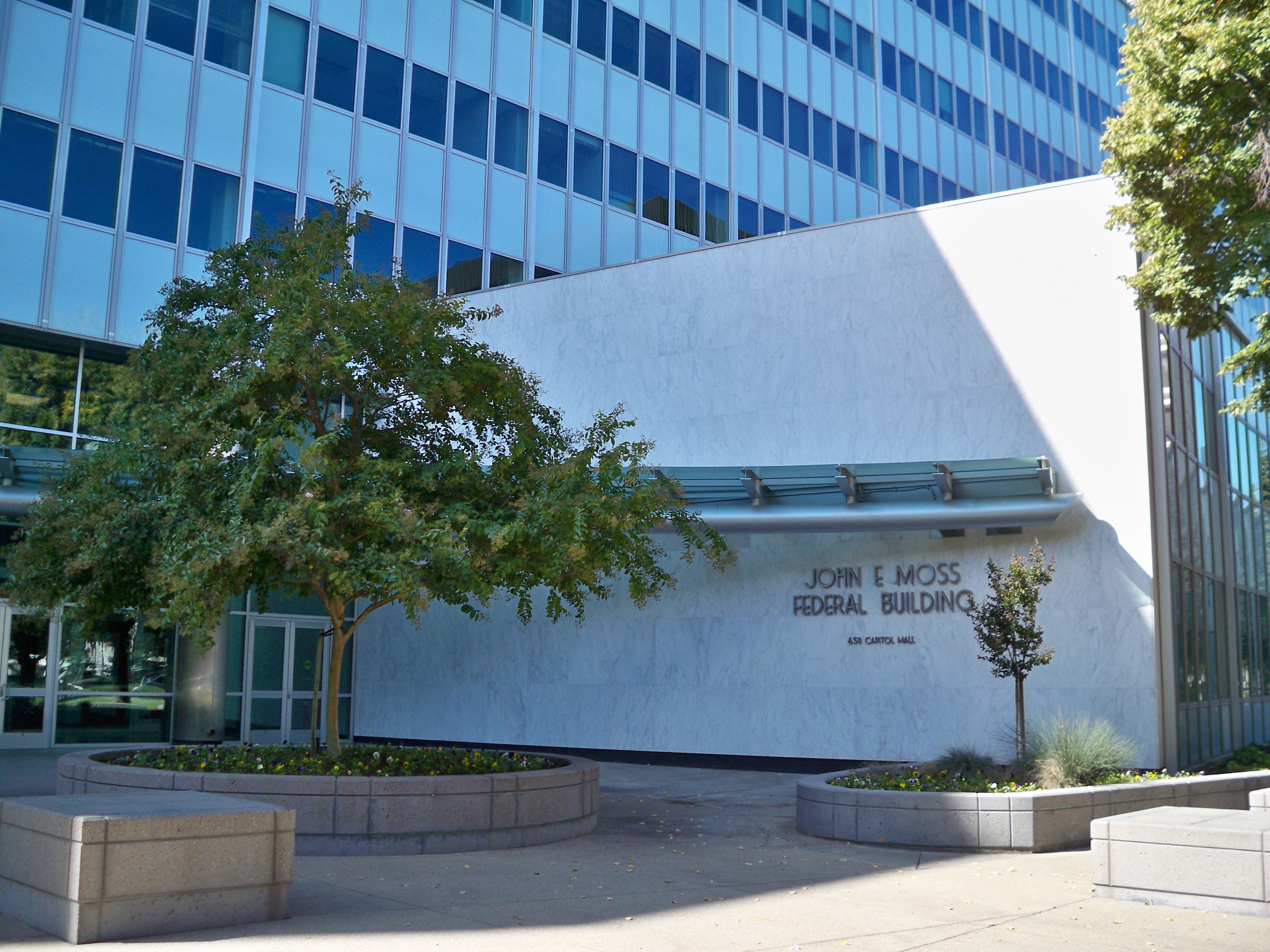
John E. Moss Federal Building in Sacramento, California

He also served on the following committees:

- Natural Resources Subcommittee on Water, Power and Oceans
- Subcommittee on Government Information and Individual Rights
- Subcommittee on Legislation and National Security
- Committees on Post Office and Civil Service and House Administration
- Joint Committee on Atomic Energy

== Tenure ==
His legislative record includes:

- Freedom of Information Act (FOIA), which he authored and sponsored through several iterations
- Consumer Product Safety Act, which he authored and advocated
- Federal Trade Commission Improvements Act, also known as the Magnuson-Moss Act
- Deregulatory legislation to establish NASDAQ
- Consumer protection legislation, including protection against hazards related to automobiles, toys, tires, flammability standards for children's clothing, and toxins.

Moss also played an active role in furthering legislative oversight, chairing hearings related to the World Uranium Cartel, FBI foreign security surveillance during the Vietnam War, abuse in federal contracting, GAAP, defensive medicine, pricing and supply of natural gas, passive restraint systems for passenger cars, regulation of pesticides, and amendments to the Foreign Corrupt Practices Act. Congressman Moss is considered the father of modern legislative oversight.

On May 1, 1973, Moss was also the first to call for the House to set up procedures for a bill of impeachment during the Watergate scandal.

=== Freedom of Information Act ===
Moss has been noted for his determination in passing the Freedom of Information Act into law. As chairman of the Government Information Subcommittee it took Moss 6 congressional sessions (over 12 years) to get the Freedom of Information Act through Congress successfully. Much of the desire for government transparency stemmed from the Department of Defense and Congressional committees evaluation of the nation's classification system in the late 1950s. They determined that the misuse of government classification of documents was causing insiders to leak documents that were marked "confidential". The Moss Committee took it upon itself to reform confidentiality policy and implement punishments for the overuse of classification by officials and departments. The landmark bill was signed into law by a reluctant Lyndon B. Johnson on July 4, 1966.

== Death and burial ==
Moss died in San Francisco on December 5, 1997, and was interred in Odd Fellows Lawn Cemetery and Mausoleum in Sacramento.

== Electoral history ==
John Moss electoral history

United States House of Representatives elections
Party	Candidate	Votes	%
Democratic	John E. Moss	87,335	50.8
Republican	Leslie E. Wood	82,133	47.8
Progressive	Helen C. Thomsen	2,443	1.4
Total votes		171,911	100.0
Democratic hold			

United States House of Representatives elections
Party	Candidate	Votes	%
Democratic	John E. Moss (Incumbent)	96,238	65.3
Republican	James H. Phillips	51,111	34.7
Total votes		147,349	100.0
Democratic hold			

United States House of Representatives elections
Party	Candidate	Votes	%
Democratic	John E. Moss (Incumbent)	132,930	68.6
Republican	Noel C. Stevenson	60,889	31.4
Total votes		193,819	100.0
Democratic hold			

United States House of Representatives elections
Party	Candidate	Votes	%
Democratic	John E. Moss (Incumbent)	169,727	100.0
Democratic hold			

1960 United States House of Representatives elections
Party	Candidate	Votes	%
Democratic	John E. Moss (Incumbent)	200,439	100.0
Democratic hold			

United States House of Representatives elections
Party	Candidate	Votes	%
Democratic	John E. Moss (Incumbent)	138,257	74.8
Republican	George W. G. Smith	46,510	25.2
Total votes		184,767	100.0
Democratic hold			

United States House of Representatives elections
Party	Candidate	Votes	%
Democratic	John E. Moss (Incumbent)	166,688	74.3
Republican	Einer B. Gjelsteen	57,630	25.7
Total votes		224,318	100.0
Democratic hold			

United States House of Representatives elections
Party	Candidate	Votes	%
Democratic	John E. Moss (Incumbent)	143,177	67.5
Republican	Terry G. Feil	69,057	32.5
Total votes		212,234	100.0
Democratic hold			

United States House of Representatives elections
Party	Candidate	Votes	%
Democratic	John E. Moss (Incumbent)	106,694	56.0
Republican	Elmore J. Duffy	79,717	41.8
American Independent	James Tarleton Slaughter	4,188	2.2
Total votes		190,599	100.0
Democratic hold			

United States House of Representatives elections
Party	Candidate	Votes	%
Democratic	John E. Moss (Incumbent)	117,496	61.6
Republican	Elmore J. Duffy	69,811	36.6
American Independent	Allen E. Priest	3,554	1.8
Total votes		190,861	100.0
Democratic hold			

United States House of Representatives elections
Party	Candidate	Votes	%
Democratic	John E. Moss (Incumbent)	151,035	69.9
Republican	John Rakus	64,949	30.1
Total votes		215,984	100.0
Democratic hold			

United States House of Representatives elections
Party	Candidate	Votes	%
Democratic	John E. Moss (Incumbent)	121,842	72.3
Republican	Ivaldo Lenci	46,585	27.7
Total votes		168,427	100.0
Democratic hold			

United States House of Representatives elections
Party	Candidate	Votes	%
Democratic	John E. Moss (Incumbent)	139,779	72.9
Republican	George R. Marsh Jr.	52,075	27.1
Total votes		191,854	100.0
Democratic hold			

U.S. House of Representatives
Preceded by Justin L. Johnson	Member of the U.S. House of Representatives from California's 3rd congressional district 1953–1978	Succeeded by Bob Matsui
