= Charles Gubser =

American politician

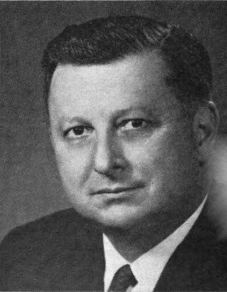

Member of the U.S. House of Representatives from California's 10th district
- In office January 3, 1953 – December 31, 1974
- Preceded by: Thomas H. Werdel
- Succeeded by: Don Edwards

Member of the California State Assembly from the 29th district
- In office January 8, 1951 - January 3, 1953
- Preceded by: John F. Thompson
- Succeeded by: Bruce F. Allen

Personal details
- Born: Charles Samuel Gubser; February 1, 1916 Gilroy, California, U.S.
- Died: August 20, 2011 (aged 95) Fresno, California, U.S.
- Party: Republican
- Education: University of California, Berkeley (BA)

Charles Samuel Gubser (February 1, 1916 – August 20, 2011) was an American educator, farmer and politician who served 11 terms as a member of the United States House of Representatives from California from 1953 to 1974.

== Early life and education ==
Born in Gilroy, California, Gubser attended the public schools and graduated from Gilroy Union High School in 1932. After attending San Jose State College for two years, Gubser graduated from the University of California, Berkeley with a Bachelor of Arts degree in 1937, followed by two years of graduate work.

== Career ==
Gubser taught at Gilroy Union High School from 1939 to 1943. Gubser had been a farmer since 1940. He served as member of the California State Assembly in 1951 and 1952.

=== Congress ===
Gubser was first elected to represent California's 10th congressional district, which included San Jose and other parts of Santa Clara County, in 1952 and was sworn in on January 3, 1953. After winning re-election ten times, Gubser did not run for re-election in 1974 and resigned his seat on December 31, 1974.

=== Issues ===
Gubser voted in favor of the Civil Rights Acts of 1957, 1960, 1964, and 1968, as well as the 24th Amendment to the U.S. Constitution and the Voting Rights Act of 1965.

== Personal life ==
Gubser died in Fresno, California, where he had lived since 2005, on August 20, 2011, at age 95.

U.S. House of Representatives
Preceded by Thomas H. Werdel	Member of the U.S. House of Representatives from California's 10th congressional district 1953–1974	Succeeded by Don Edwards
