= William S. Mailliard =

American politician (1917–1992)

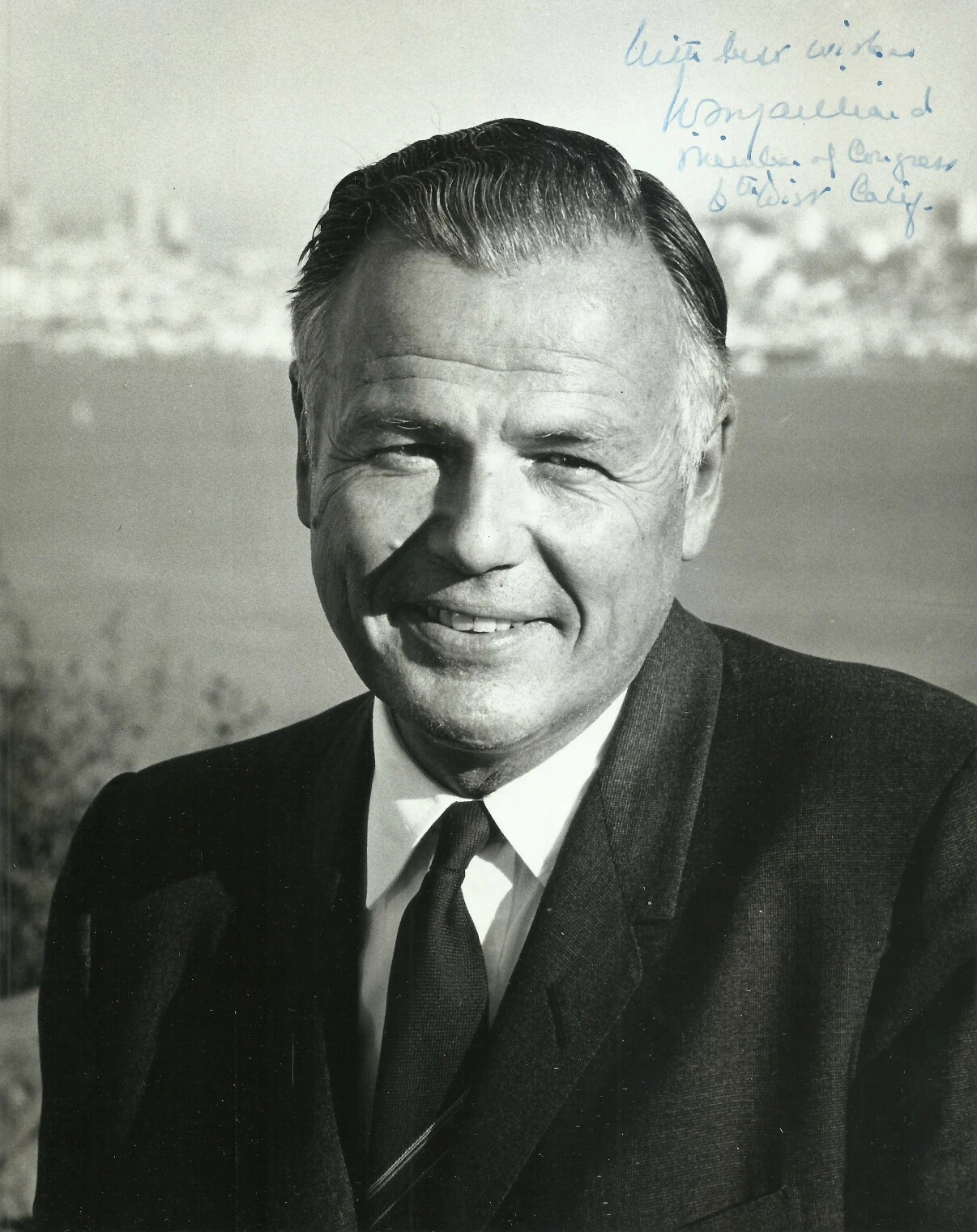
- Mailliard c. 1972

8th United States Ambassador to the Organization of American States
- In office March 7, 1974 – February 1, 1977
- President: Richard Nixon; Gerald Ford
- Preceded by: Joseph J. Jova
- Succeeded by: Gale W. McGee

Member of the U.S. House of Representatives from California
- In office January 3, 1953 – March 5, 1974
- Preceded by: Franck R. Havenner
- Succeeded by: John L. Burton
- Constituency: 4th district (1953–1963); 6th district (1963–1974)

Personal details
- Born: William Somers Mailliard; June 10, 1917 Belvedere, California, U.S.
- Died: June 10, 1992 (aged 75) Reston, Virginia, U.S.
- Party: Republican
- Spouse(s): Elizabeth Whinny; Millicent Fox
- Children: 7
- Education: Yale University (BA); Naval War College
- Occupation: banker
- Awards: Silver Star; Legion of Merit; Bronze Star Medal

Military service
- Allegiance: United States
- Branch/service: U.S. Navy; U.S. Navy Reserve
- Battles/wars: World War II

William Somers Mailliard (June 10, 1917 – June 10, 1992) was an American politician and businessman who served as a member of the U.S. House of Representatives from California's 4th and 6th congressional districts from 1953 to 1974.

During his time in Congress, Mailliard was known for his support of environmental conservation and his efforts to protect California's natural resources. He was a strong advocate for the preservation of the Redwood National Park, which was established during his tenure in Congress.

Mailliard also played a key role in the creation of the Point Reyes National Seashore, a protected area of coastline and wilderness in Northern California. He worked to secure funding for the park and helped to guide its development and management.

In addition to his work in Congress, Mailliard was also a successful businessman, and he played a key role in the development of the Mailliard Ranch, a cattle ranch in Sonoma County, California. He was also involved in the wine industry, and he helped to establish the Sonoma County Wine Library, which is now part of the Sonoma County Library system.

Mailliard died in 1992 at the age of 75.

== Early life ==
William S. Mailliard was born on June 10, 1917, in Belvedere, California. He attended Tamalpais High School in San Rafael, California, and the Taft School in Watertown, Connecticut. He graduated with a Bachelor of Arts from Yale University in 1939.

== Career ==
He engaged in the banking business with American Trust Co., San Francisco, Calif., in 1940 and 1941. He served as assistant naval attaché in the United States Embassy in London in 1939 and 1940; with Bureau of Naval Personnel, Washington, D.C., in 1941 and 1942; attended the Naval War College in 1942; was assigned to duty on staff of Seventh Amphibious Force as flag lieutenant and aide to Vice Adm. D.E. Barbey in 1943 and released to inactive duty in March 1946 as a lieutenant commander; Captain, USNR; awarded Silver Star, Legion of Merit, Bronze Star Medal;. promoted to commander in 1950 and to rear admiral in 1965 in the U.S. Navy Reserve.

He resumed his banking career in 1946 and 1947 and was assistant to the director of the California Youth Authority in 1947 and 1948. An unsuccessful Republican candidate for election in 1948 to the 81st Congress and secretary to Gov. Earl Warren 1948–1951. Executive assistant to the director of the California Academy of Sciences in 1951 and 1952 and elected as a Republican to the 83rd and to the ten succeeding Congresses, serving from January 3, 1953, until his resignation on March 5, 1974. He was succeeded by John Burton, the narrow majority winner of a special election to fill his vacated seat. Mailliard is the last Republican to have represented San Francisco and Marin County in Congress.

He was a permanent Representative of the United States to the Organization of American States with the rank of ambassador, March 7, 1974, to February 1, 1977, and nominated by President Gerald R. Ford and confirmed by the United States Senate on December 10, 1975, to be a member of the Board of Directors of the Inter-American Foundation and was a resident of the community of Belvedere, California, consisting of the eponymous island, along with part of Corinthian Island, in the San Francisco Bay, just offshore from the Tiburon Peninsula. He moved to San Francisco, California, before his death. Mailliard voted in favor of the 1957 Civil Rights Act, the Civil Rights Act of 1960, the Civil Rights Act of 1964, and the Civil Rights Act of 1968. He voted as well for the 24th Amendment to the U.S. Constitution and the Voting Rights Act of 1965.

== Personal life ==
He and his first wife, Elizabeth Whinny, had four of his seven children: William S. Mailliard Jr, Antoinette Mailliard, Henry Ward Mailliard, and Kristina Mailliard. After a divorce, he married Millicent Fox, and had three more children; Julia Mailliard, Josephine Mailliard, and Leigh Mailliard. Millicent died on May 2, 2022, at 93 years old.

== Death ==
Mailliard died in Reston, Virginia, on June 10, 1992, his 75th birthday.

== Electoral history ==
William S. Maillard electoral history

1952 United States House of Representatives elections
| Party | Candidate | Votes | % |
|---|---|---|---|
| Republican | William S. Mailliard | 102,359 | 55 |
| Democratic | Franck R. Havenner (Incumbent) | 83,748 | 45 |
| Total votes | | 186,107 | 100 |
| Turnout | | | |
| Republican gain from Democratic | | | |

1954 United States House of Representatives elections
| Party | Candidate | Votes | % |
|---|---|---|---|
| Republican | William S. Mailliard (Incumbent) | 88,439 | 61.2 |
| Democratic | Philip A. O'Rourke | 52,980 | 36.7 |
| Progressive | George R. Andersen | 2,987 | 2.1 |
| Total votes | | 144,406 | 100.0 |
| Turnout | | | |
| Republican hold | | | |

1956 United States House of Representatives elections
| Party | Candidate | Votes | % |
|---|---|---|---|
| Republican | William S. Mailliard (Incumbent) | 109,188 | 61.9 |
| Democratic | James L. Quigley | 67,132 | 38.1 |
| Total votes | | 176,320 | 100.0 |
| Turnout | | | |
| Republican hold | | | |

1958 United States House of Representatives elections
| Party | Candidate | Votes | % |
|---|---|---|---|
| Republican | William S. Mailliard (Incumbent) | 98,574 | 63.9 |
| Democratic | George D. Collins Jr. | 65,798 | 36.1 |
| Total votes | | 164,372 | 100.0 |
| Turnout | | | |
| Republican hold | | | |

1960 United States House of Representatives elections
| Party | Candidate | Votes | % |
|---|---|---|---|
| Republican | William S. Mailliard (Incumbent) | 118,249 | 65.3 |
| Democratic | Phillips S. Davies | 62,814 | 34.7 |
| Total votes | | 181,063 | 100.0 |
| Turnout | | | |
| Republican hold | | | |

1962 United States House of Representatives elections
| Party | Candidate | Votes | % |
|---|---|---|---|
| Republican | William S. Mailliard (Incumbent) | 105,762 | 58.7 |
| Democratic | John A. O'Connell | 74,429 | 41.3 |
| Total votes | | 180,191 | 100.0 |
| Republican hold | | | |

1964 United States House of Representatives elections
| Party | Candidate | Votes | % |
|---|---|---|---|
| Republican | William S. Mailliard (Incumbent) | 125,869 | 63.6 |
| Democratic | Thomas P. O'Toole | 71,894 | 36.3 |
| Total votes | | 197,763 | 100.0 |
| Republican hold | | | |

1966 United States House of Representatives elections
| Party | Candidate | Votes | % |
|---|---|---|---|
| Republican | William S. Mailliard (Incumbent) | 132,506 | 76.6 |
| Democratic | Le Rue Grim | 40,514 | 23.4 |
| Total votes | | 173,020 | 100.0 |
| Republican hold | | | |

1968 United States House of Representatives elections
| Party | Candidate | Votes | % |
|---|---|---|---|
| Republican | William S. Mailliard (Incumbent) | 140,071 | 72.8 |
| Democratic | Phillip Drath | 52,433 | 27.2 |
| Total votes | | 192,504 | 100.0 |
| Republican hold | | | |

1970 United States House of Representatives elections
| Party | Candidate | Votes | % |
|---|---|---|---|
| Republican | William S. Mailliard (Incumbent) | 96,393 | 53.3 |
| Democratic | Russell R. Miller | 84,255 | 46.6 |
| Total votes | | 180,648 | 100.0 |
| Republican hold | | | |

1972 United States House of Representatives elections
| Party | Candidate | Votes | % |
|---|---|---|---|
| Republican | William S. Mailliard (Incumbent) | 118,197 | 52.0 |
| Democratic | Roger Boas | 108,934 | 48.0 |
| Total votes | | 227,131 | 100.0 |
| Republican hold | | | |

U.S. House of Representatives
| Preceded by Franck R. Havenner | Member of the U.S. House of Representatives from California's 4th congressional district 1953–1963 | Succeeded by Robert L. Leggett |
| Preceded by John F. Baldwin Jr. | Member of the U.S. House of Representatives from California's 6th congressional district 1963–1974 | Succeeded by John L. Burton |
| Preceded by Thor C. Tollefson | Ranking Member of the House Merchant Marine and Fisheries Committee; 1965–1971 | Succeeded by Thomas Pelly |
| Preceded by E. Ross Adair | Ranking Member of the House Foreign Affairs Committee; 1971–1973 | Succeeded by John N. Erlenborn |
