= 1944 United States House of Representatives elections in California =

- November 7, 1944

All 23 California seats to the United States House of Representatives
	Majority party	Minority party
Party	Democratic	Republican
Last election	12	11
Seats won	16	7
Seat change	▲4	▼4
Popular vote	1,479,443	1,519,190
Percentage	49.23%	50.56%
- Democratic gain Republican gain Democratic hold Republican hold

The United States House of Representatives elections in California, 1944 was an election for California's delegation to the United States House of Representatives, which occurred as part of the general election of the House of Representatives on November 7, 1944. Democrats picked up four districts.

== Overview ==
United States House of Representatives elections in California, 1944
Party	Votes	Percentage	Seats	+/–
Republican	1,519,190	50.56%	7	-4
Democratic	1,479,443	49.23%	16	+4
Prohibition	6,309	0.21%	0	0
Totals	3,004,942	100.0%	23	—

== Delegation composition ==
Pre-election	Seats
Democratic-Held	12
Republican-Held	11

Post-election	Seats
Democratic-Held	16
Republican-Held	7

== Results ==
Final results from the Clerk of the House of Representatives:

=== District 1 ===
California's 1st congressional district election, 1944
Party	Candidate	Votes	%
Democratic	Clarence F. Lea (incumbent)	92,706	100.0
Turnout			
Democratic hold			

=== District 2 ===
California's 2nd congressional district election, 1944
Party	Candidate	Votes	%
Democratic	Clair Engle (incumbent)	48,201	63.8
Republican	Jesse M. Mayo	27,312	36.2
Total votes		75,513	100.0
Turnout			
Democratic gain from Republican			

Engle had been elected to finish the term of the late Republican representative Harry L. Englebright on May 13, 1943.

=== District 3 ===
California's 3rd congressional district election, 1944
Party	Candidate	Votes	%
Republican	Justin L. Johnson (incumbent)	131,705	100.0
Turnout			
Republican hold			

=== District 4 ===
California's 4th congressional district election, 1944
Party	Candidate	Votes	%
Democratic	Franck R. Havenner	73,582	50.1
Republican	Thomas Rolph (incumbent)	73,367	49.9
Total votes		146,949	100.0
Turnout			
Democratic gain from Republican			

=== District 5 ===
California's 5th congressional district election, 1944
Party	Candidate	Votes	%
Republican	Richard J. Welch (incumbent)	112,151	100.0
Turnout			
Republican hold			

=== District 6 ===
California's 6th congressional district election, 1944
Party	Candidate	Votes	%
Democratic	George P. Miller	104,441	52
Republican	Albert E. Carter (incumbent)	96,395	48
Total votes		200,836	100.0
Turnout			
Democratic gain from Republican			

=== District 7 ===
California's 7th congressional district election, 1944
Party	Candidate	Votes	%
Democratic	John H. Tolan (incumbent)	81,762	57.9
Republican	Chelsey M. Walter	59,360	42.1
Total votes		141,122	100.0
Turnout			
Democratic hold			

=== District 8 ===
California's 8th congressional district election, 1944
Party	Candidate	Votes	%
Republican	Jack Z. Anderson (incumbent)	94,218	56.5
Democratic	Arthur L. Johnson	72,420	43.5
Total votes		166,638	100.0
Turnout			
Republican hold			

=== District 9 ===
California's 9th congressional district election, 1944
Party	Candidate	Votes	%
Republican	Bertrand W. Gearhart (incumbent)	66,845	100.0
Turnout			
Republican hold			

=== District 10 ===
California's 10th congressional district election, 1944
Party	Candidate	Votes	%
Democratic	Alfred J. Elliott (incumbent)	60,001	100.0
Turnout			
Democratic hold			

=== District 11 ===
California's 11th congressional district election, 1944
Party	Candidate	Votes	%
Democratic	George E. Outland (incumbent)	52,218	56
Republican	A. J. Dingeman	41,005	44
Total votes		93,223	100
Turnout			
Democratic hold			

=== District 12 ===
California's 12th congressional district election, 1944
Party	Candidate	Votes	%
Democratic	Jerry Voorhis (incumbent)	77,385	55.3
Republican	Roy P. McLaughlin	62,524	44.7
Total votes		139,909	100.0
Turnout			
Democratic hold			

=== District 13 ===
California's 13th congressional district election, 1944
Party	Candidate	Votes	%
Democratic	Ned R. Healy	66,854	55
Republican	Norris Poulson (incumbent)	54,792	45
Total votes		121,646	100
Turnout			
Democratic gain from Republican			

=== District 14 ===
California's 14th congressional district election, 1944
Party	Candidate	Votes	%
Democratic	Helen Gahagan Douglas	65,729	51.6
Republican	William D. Campbell	61,767	48.4
Total votes		127,496	100.0
Turnout			
Democratic hold			

=== District 15 ===
California's 15th congressional district election, 1944
Party	Candidate	Votes	%
Republican	Gordon L. McDonough	100,305	56.8
Democratic	Hal Styles	73,655	41.7
Prohibition	Johannes Nielson-Lange	2,694	1.5
Total votes		176,654	100.0
Turnout			
Republican gain from Democratic			

=== District 16 ===
California's 16th congressional district election, 1944
Party	Candidate	Votes	%
Democratic	Ellis E. Patterson	105,835	54.1
Republican	Jesse Randolph Kellems	89,700	45.9
Total votes		195,535	100.0
Turnout			
Democratic hold			

=== District 17 ===
California's 17th congressional district election, 1944
Party	Candidate	Votes	%
Democratic	Cecil R. King (incumbent)	147,217	100.0
Turnout			
Democratic hold			

=== District 18 ===
California's 18th congressional district election, 1944
Party	Candidate	Votes	%
Democratic	Clyde Doyle	95,090	55.7
Republican	William Ward Johnson (incumbent)	75,749	44.3
Total votes		170,839	100.0
Turnout			
Democratic gain from Republican			

=== District 19 ===
California's 19th congressional district election, 1944
Party	Candidate	Votes	%
Democratic	Chet Holifield (incumbent)	65,758	71.8
Republican	Carlton H. Casjens	25,852	28.2
Total votes		91,610	100.0
Turnout			
Democratic hold			

=== District 20 ===
California's 20th congressional district election, 1944
Party	Candidate	Votes	%
Republican	John Carl Hinshaw (incumbent)	112,663	51.8
Democratic	Archibald B. Young	101,090	46.5
Prohibition	Charles Hiram Randall	3,615	1.5
Total votes		217,368	100.0
Turnout			
Republican hold			

=== District 21 ===
California's 21st congressional district election, 1944
Party	Candidate	Votes	%
Democratic	Harry R. Sheppard (incumbent)	48,539	58.5
Republican	Earl S. Webb	34,409	41.5
Total votes		82,948	100.0
Turnout			
Democratic hold			

=== District 22 ===
California's 22nd congressional district election, 1944
Party	Candidate	Votes	%
Republican	John J. Phillips (incumbent)	88,537	100.0
Turnout			
Republican hold			

=== District 23 ===
California's 23rd congressional district election, 1944
Party	Candidate	Votes	%
Democratic	Edouard Izac (incumbent)	86,707	55.1
Republican	James B. Abbey	70,787	44.9
Total votes		157,494	100.0
Turnout			
Democratic hold			

== See also ==
- 79th United States Congress
- Political party strength in California
- Political party strength in U.S. states
- 1944 United States House of Representatives elections
