= 1942 United States House of Representatives elections in California =

- November 3, 1942

All 23 California seats to the United States House of Representatives
	Majority party	Minority party
Party	Democratic	Republican
Last election	10	10
Seats won	12	11
Seat change	▲2	▲1
Popular vote	906,614	937,392
Percentage	47.74%	49.36%
- Democratic gain Republican gain Democratic hold Republican hold

The United States House of Representatives elections in California, 1942 was an election for California's delegation to the United States House of Representatives, which occurred as part of the general election of the House of Representatives on November 3, 1942. California gained three districts as a result of the 1940 census, two of which were won by Democrats and one by Republicans. Of California's existing seats, Democrats and Republicans each swapped one district.

== Overview ==
United States House of Representatives elections in California, 1942
Party	Votes	Percentage	Seats	+/–
Republican	937,392	49.4%	11	+1
Democratic	906,614	47.7%	12	+2
Communist	28,026	1.5%	0	0
Prohibition	17,049	0.9%	0	0
Townsend	9,843	0.5%	0	0
Write-ins	185	0.0%	0	0
Totals	1,899,109	100.0%	23	+3

== Delegation composition ==
Pre-election	Seats
Democratic-Held	10
Republican-Held	10

Post-election	Seats
Democratic-Held	12
Republican-Held	11

== Results ==
Final results from the Clerk of the House of Representatives:

=== District 1 ===
California's 1st congressional district election, 1942
Party	Candidate	Votes	%
Democratic	Clarence F. Lea (incumbent)	78,281	93.2
Communist	Albert J. Lima	5,703	6.8
Total votes		83,984	100.0
Turnout			
Democratic hold			

=== District 2 ===
California's 2nd congressional district election, 1942
Party	Candidate	Votes	%
Republican	Harry Lane Englebright (incumbent)	50,094	100.0
Turnout			
Republican hold			

=== District 3 ===
California's 3rd congressional district election, 1942
Party	Candidate	Votes	%
Republican	Justin L. Johnson (incumbent)	63,982	54.5
Democratic	Joseph B. O'Neil	53,521	45.5
Total votes		117,503	100.0
Turnout			
Republican hold			

=== District 4 ===
California's 4th congressional district election, 1942
Party	Candidate	Votes	%
Republican	Thomas Rolph (incumbent)	62,735	98.3
Communist	Archie Brown (write-in)	1,116	1.7
Total votes		63,851	100.0
Turnout			
Republican hold			

=== District 5 ===
California's 5th congressional district election, 1942
Party	Candidate	Votes	%
Republican	Richard J. Welch (incumbent)	85,747	92.7
Communist	Walter R. Lambert	6,749	7.3
Total votes		92,496	100.0
Turnout			
Republican hold			

=== District 6 ===
California's 6th congressional district election, 1942
Party	Candidate	Votes	%
Republican	Albert E. Carter (incumbent)	108,585	92.6
Communist	Clarence Paton	8,532	7.3
No party	William H. Hollander (write-in)	185	0.1
Total votes		117,302	100.0
Turnout			
Republican hold			

=== District 7 ===
California's 7th congressional district election, 1942
Party	Candidate	Votes	%
Democratic	John H. Tolan (incumbent)	77,292	100.0
Turnout			
Democratic hold			

=== District 8 ===
California's 8th congressional district election, 1942
Party	Candidate	Votes	%
Republican	Jack Z. Anderson (incumbent)	91,536	99.9
Communist	Elizabeth Nicholas (write-in)	102	0.1
Total votes		91,638	100.0
Turnout			
Republican hold			

=== District 9 ===
California's 9th congressional district election, 1942
Party	Candidate	Votes	%
Republican	Bertrand W. Gearhart (incumbent)	65,791	100.0
Turnout			
Republican hold			

=== District 10 ===
California's 10th congressional district election, 1942
Party	Candidate	Votes	%
Democratic	Alfred J. Elliott (incumbent)	43,864	100.0
Turnout			
Democratic hold			

=== District 11 ===
California's 11th congressional district election, 1942
Party	Candidate	Votes	%
Democratic	George E. Outland	31,611	50.7
Republican	A. J. Dingeman	30,781	49.3
Total votes		62,392	100.0
Turnout			
Democratic win (new seat)			

=== District 12 ===
California's 12th congressional district election, 1942
Party	Candidate	Votes	%
Democratic	Jerry Voorhis (incumbent)	53,705	56.8
Republican	Robert P. Shuler	40,780	43.2
Total votes		94,485	100.0
Turnout			
Democratic hold			

=== District 13 ===
California's 13th congressional district election, 1942
Party	Candidate	Votes	%
Republican	Norris Poulson	38,577	49.5
Democratic	Charles Kramer (incumbent)	33,060	42.4
Townsend	Calvert S. Wilson	6,306	8.1
Total votes		77,943	100.0
Turnout			
Republican gain from Democratic			

=== District 14 ===
California's 14th congressional district election, 1942
Party	Candidate	Votes	%
Democratic	Thomas F. Ford (incumbent)	49,326	67
Republican	Herbert L. Herberts	24,349	33
Total votes		73,675	100
Turnout			
Democratic hold			

=== District 15 ===
California's 15th congressional district election, 1942
Party	Candidate	Votes	%
Democratic	John M. Costello (incumbent)	88,798	86.2
Prohibition	B. Tarkington Dowden	10,185	9.9
Communist	Philip Gardner	3,989	3.9
Total votes		102,972	100.0
Turnout			
Democratic hold			

=== District 16 ===
California's 16th congressional district election, 1942
Party	Candidate	Votes	%
Democratic	Will Rogers, Jr.	61,437	53.7
Republican	Leland M. Ford (incumbent)	52,023	45.4
Communist	Allen L. Ryan	1,043	0.9
Total votes		114,503	100.0
Turnout			
Democratic gain from Republican			

=== District 17 ===
California's 17th congressional district election, 1942
Party	Candidate	Votes	%
Democratic	Cecil R. King (incumbent)	92,260	100.0
Turnout			
Democratic hold			

=== District 18 ===
California's 18th congressional district election, 1942
Party	Candidate	Votes	%
Republican	William Ward Johnson (incumbent)	53,136	56.8
Democratic	Francis H. Gentry	40,339	43.2
Total votes		93,475	100.0
Turnout			
Republican hold			

=== District 19 ===
California's 19th congressional district election, 1942
Party	Candidate	Votes	%
Democratic	Chet Holifield	34,918	63.1
Republican	Carlton H. Casjens	20,446	36.9
Total votes		55,374	100.0
Turnout			
Democratic win (new seat)			

=== District 20 ===
California's 20th congressional district election, 1942
Party	Candidate	Votes	%
Republican	John Carl Hinshaw (incumbent)	62,628	48.4
Democratic	Joseph O. Donovan	55,479	42.9
Prohibition	Virgil G. Hinshaw	6,864	5.3
Townsend	Janie Bele McCarty	3,537	2.7
Communist	Orla E. Lair	792	0.6
Total votes		129,300	100.0
Turnout			
Republican hold			

=== District 21 ===
California's 21st congressional district election, 1942
Party	Candidate	Votes	%
Democratic	Harry R. Sheppard (incumbent)	38,419	96.6
Republican	Arthur E. Isham (write-in)	1,350	3.4
Total votes		39,769	100.0
Turnout			
Democratic hold			

=== District 22 ===
California's 22nd congressional district election, 1942
Party	Candidate	Votes	%
Republican	John J. Phillips	42,765	57.6
Democratic	N. E. West	31,440	42.4
Total votes		74,205	100.0
Turnout			
Republican win (new seat)			

=== District 23 ===
California's 23rd congressional district election, 1942
Party	Candidate	Votes	%
Democratic	Edouard Izac (incumbent)	42,864	50.5
Republican	James B. Abbey	42,087	49.5
Total votes		84,951	100.0
Turnout			
Democratic hold			

== See also ==
- 78th United States Congress
- Political party strength in California
- Political party strength in U.S. states
- 1942 United States House of Representatives elections
