= 1946 United States House of Representatives elections in California =

- November 5, 1946

All 23 California seats to the United States House of Representatives
	Majority party	Minority party
Party	Republican	Democratic
Last election	7	16
Seats won	14	9
Seat change	▲7	▼7
Popular vote	1,203,346	1,126,591
Percentage	51.59%	48.30%
- Republican gain Democratic hold Republican hold

The United States House of Representatives elections in California, 1946 was an election for California's delegation to the United States House of Representatives, which occurred as part of the general election of the House of Representatives on November 5, 1946. Republicans captured control of Congress for the first time since 1928 due to the extreme unpopularity of President Harry Truman. California was indicative of the results as Republicans gained seven seats, one of which was won by a recently returned WWII veteran named Richard Nixon. Democrats would not regain a majority of the delegation until after the 1958 election.

== Overview ==
United States House of Representatives elections in California, 1946
Party	Votes	%	Before	After	+/–
Republican	1,203,346	51.59%	7	14	+7
Democratic	1,126,591	48.30%	16	9	-7
Prohibition	1,476	0.06%	0	0	0
Write-ins	1,248	0.05%	0	0	0
Totals	2,332,661	100.0%	23	23	—

== Results ==
Final results from the Clerk of the House of Representatives:

=== District 1 ===
California's 1st congressional district election, 1946
Party	Candidate	Votes	%
Democratic	Clarence F. Lea (incumbent)	77,653	100.0
Turnout			
Democratic hold			

=== District 2 ===
California's 2nd congressional district election, 1946
Party	Candidate	Votes	%
Democratic	Clair Engle (incumbent)	57,895	100.0
Turnout			
Democratic hold			

=== District 3 ===
California's 3rd congressional district election, 1946
Party	Candidate	Votes	%
Republican	Justin L. Johnson (incumbent)	116,792	100.0
Turnout			
Republican hold			

=== District 4 ===
California's 4th congressional district election, 1946
Party	Candidate	Votes	%
Democratic	Franck R. Havenner (incumbent)	60,655	52.9
Republican	Truman R. Young	54,113	47.1
Total votes		114,768	100.0
Turnout			
Democratic hold			

=== District 5 ===
California's 5th congressional district election, 1946
Party	Candidate	Votes	%
Republican	Richard J. Welch (incumbent)	94,293	100.0
Turnout			
Republican hold			

=== District 6 ===
California's 6th congressional district election, 1946
Party	Candidate	Votes	%
Democratic	George P. Miller (incumbent)	118,548	100.0
Turnout			
Democratic hold			

=== District 7 ===
California's 7th congressional district election, 1946
Party	Candidate	Votes	%
Republican	John J. Allen, Jr.	61,508	56.2
Democratic	Patrick W. McDonough	47,988	43.8
Total votes		109,496	100.0
Turnout			
Republican gain from Democratic			

=== District 8 ===
California's 8th congressional district election, 1946
Party	Candidate	Votes	%
Republican	Jack Z. Anderson (incumbent)	113,325	100.0
Turnout			
Republican hold			

=== District 9 ===
California's 9th congressional district election, 1946
Party	Candidate	Votes	%
Republican	Bertrand W. Gearhart (incumbent)	50,171	53.7
Democratic	Hubert Phillips	43,244	46.3
Total votes		93,415	100.0
Turnout			
Republican hold			

=== District 10 ===
California's 10th congressional district election, 1946
Party	Candidate	Votes	%
Democratic	Alfred J. Elliott (incumbent)	51,843	100.0
Turnout			
Democratic hold			

=== District 11 ===
California's 11th congressional district election, 1946
Party	Candidate	Votes	%
Republican	Ernest K. Bramblett	41,902	53.1
Democratic	George E. Outland (incumbent)	36,996	46.9
Total votes		78,898	100.0
Turnout			
Republican gain from Democratic			

=== District 12 ===
California's 12th congressional district election, 1946
Party	Candidate	Votes	%
Republican	Richard Nixon	65,586	56.0
Democratic	Jerry Voorhis (incumbent)	49,994	42.7
Prohibition	John Henry Hoeppel	1,476	1.3
Total votes		117,069	100.0
Turnout			
Republican gain from Democratic			

=== District 13 ===
California's 13th congressional district election, 1946
Party	Candidate	Votes	%
Republican	Norris Poulson	48,071	51.8
Democratic	Ned R. Healy (incumbent)	44,712	48.2
Total votes		92,783	100.0
Turnout			
Republican gain from Democratic			

=== District 14 ===
California's 14th congressional district election, 1946
Party	Candidate	Votes	%
Democratic	Helen Gahagan Douglas (incumbent)	53,536	54.4
Republican	Frederick M. Roberts	44,914	45.6
Total votes		98,450	100.0
Turnout			
Democratic hold			

=== District 15 ===
California's 15th congressional district election, 1946
Party	Candidate	Votes	%
Republican	Gordon L. McDonough (incumbent)	106,020	100.0
Turnout			
Republican hold			

=== District 16 ===
California's 16th congressional district election, 1946
Party	Candidate	Votes	%
Republican	Donald L. Jackson	78,264	53.9
Democratic	Harold Harby	45,951	31.7
Democratic	Ellis E. Patterson (write-in)	20,945	14.4
Total votes		145,160	100.0
Turnout			
Republican gain from Democratic			

=== District 17 ===
California's 17th congressional district election, 1946
Party	Candidate	Votes	%
Democratic	Cecil R. King (incumbent)	110,654	100.0
Turnout			
Democratic hold			

=== District 18 ===
California's 18th congressional district election, 1946
Party	Candidate	Votes	%
Republican	Willis W. Bradley	67,363	55.7
Democratic	Clyde Doyle (incumbent)	60,218	44.3
Total votes		127,581	100.0
Turnout			
Republican gain from Democratic			

=== District 19 ===
California's 19th congressional district election, 1946
Party	Candidate	Votes	%
Democratic	Chet Holifield (incumbent)	50,666	97.6
No party	Marshall J. Morrill (write-in)	1,248	2.4
Total votes		51,914	100.0
Turnout			
Democratic hold			

=== District 20 ===
California's 20th congressional district election, 1946
Party	Candidate	Votes	%
Republican	John Carl Hinshaw (incumbent)	98,283	63.2
Democratic	Everett G. Burkhalter	67,317	36.8
Total votes		165,600	100.0
Turnout			
Republican hold			

=== District 21 ===
California's 21st congressional district election, 1946
Party	Candidate	Votes	%
Democratic	Harry R. Sheppard (incumbent)	37,229	52.7
Republican	Lowell E. Lathrop	33,395	47.3
Total votes		70,624	100.0
Turnout			
Democratic hold			

=== District 22 ===
California's 22nd congressional district election, 1946
Party	Candidate	Votes	%
Republican	John J. Phillips (incumbent)	59,935	62.1
Democratic	Ray Adkinson	36,649	37.9
Total votes		96,584	100.0
Turnout			
Republican hold			

=== District 23 ===
California's 23rd congressional district election, 1946
Party	Candidate	Votes	%
Republican	Charles K. Fletcher	69,411	56.3
Democratic	Edouard Izac (incumbent)	53,898	43.7
Total votes		123,309	100.0
Turnout			
Republican gain from Democratic			

== See also ==
- 80th United States Congress
- Political party strength in California
- Political party strength in U.S. states
- 1946 United States House of Representatives elections
