= 1948 United States House of Representatives elections in California =

- November 2, 1948

All 23 California seats to the United States House of Representatives
| | Majority party | Minority party | Third party |
|---|---|---|---|
| Party | Republican | Democratic | Progressive |
| Last election | 14 | 9 | New |
| Seats won | 13 | 10 | 0 |
| Seat change | ▼1 | ▲1 | Steady |
| Popular vote | 1,974,748 | 1,400,487 | 182,252 |
| Percentage | 55.5% | 39.4% | 5.1% |
| Swing | ▲3.9% | ▼8.9% | ▲5.1% |
- Democratic gain Republican gain Democratic hold Republican hold

The United States House of Representatives elections in California, 1948 was an election for California's delegation to the United States House of Representatives, which occurred as part of the general election of the House of Representatives on November 2, 1948. Democrats picked up three districts while losing two for a net gain of one seat.

== Overview ==
Final results from the Clerk of the House of Representatives:

United States House of Representatives elections in California, 1948
| Party | Votes | % | Before | After | +/– |
|---|---|---|---|---|---|
| Republican | 1,974,748 | 55.5% | 14 | 13 | -1 |
| Democratic | 1,400,487 | 39.4% | 9 | 10 | +1 |
| Progressive | 182,252 | 5.1% | 0 | 0 | 0 |
| Independent | 1,013 | 0.0% | 0 | 0 | 0 |
| Totals | 3,558,500 | 100.0% | 23 | 23 | — |

== District 1 ==
California's 1st congressional district election, 1948
| Party | Candidate | Votes | % |
|---|---|---|---|
| Republican | Hubert B. Scudder | 82,947 | 54.5 |
| Democratic | Sterling J. Norgard | 68,951 | 45.3 |
| Progressive | Roger Kent (write-in) | 304 | 0.2 |
| Total votes | | 152,302 | 100.0 |
| Turnout | | | |
| Republican gain from Democratic | | | |

== District 2 ==
California's 2nd congressional district election, 1948
| Party | Candidate | Votes | % |
|---|---|---|---|
| Democratic | Clair Engle (incumbent) | 78,555 | 100.0 |
| Turnout | | | |
| Democratic hold | | | |

== District 3 ==
California's 3rd congressional district election, 1948
| Party | Candidate | Votes | % |
|---|---|---|---|
| Republican | Justin L. Johnson (incumbent) | 166,571 | 84.4 |
| Progressive | James B. "Bert" Willard | 30,878 | 15.6 |
| Total votes | | 197,449 | 100.0 |
| Turnout | | | |
| Republican hold | | | |

== District 4 ==
California's 4th congressional district election, 1948
| Party | Candidate | Votes | % |
|---|---|---|---|
| Democratic | Franck R. Havenner (incumbent) | 73,704 | 51.0 |
| Republican | William S. Mailliard | 68,875 | 47.7 |
| Progressive | Francis J. McTernan, Jr. | 1,949 | 1.3 |
| Total votes | | 144,528 | 100.0 |
| Turnout | | | |
| Democratic hold | | | |

== District 5 ==
California's 5th congressional district election, 1948
| Party | Candidate | Votes | % |
|---|---|---|---|
| Republican | Richard J. Welch (incumbent) | 116,347 | 100.0 |
| Turnout | | | |
| Republican hold | | | |

== District 6 ==
California's 6th congressional district election, 1948
| Party | Candidate | Votes | % |
|---|---|---|---|
| Democratic | George P. Miller (incumbent) | 194,985 | 100.0 |
| Turnout | | | |
| Democratic hold | | | |

== District 7 ==
California's 7th congressional district election, 1948
| Party | Candidate | Votes | % |
|---|---|---|---|
| Republican | John J. Allen, Jr. (incumbent) | 78,534 | 51.4 |
| Democratic | Buell G. Gallagher | 74,318 | 48.6 |
| Total votes | | 152,852 | 100.0 |
| Turnout | | | |
| Republican hold | | | |

== District 8 ==
California's 8th congressional district election, 1948
| Party | Candidate | Votes | % |
|---|---|---|---|
| Republican | Jack Z. Anderson (incumbent) | 161,743 | 79.9 |
| Progressive | Paul Taylor | 40,670 | 20.1 |
| Total votes | | 202,413 | 100.0 |
| Turnout | | | |
| Republican hold | | | |

== District 9 ==
California's 9th congressional district election, 1948
| Party | Candidate | Votes | % |
|---|---|---|---|
| Democratic | Cecil F. White | 72,826 | 51.3 |
| Republican | Bertrand W. Gearhart (incumbent) | 66,563 | 46.9 |
| Progressive | Josephine F. Daniels | 2,573 | 1.8 |
| Total votes | | 141,962 | 100.0 |
| Turnout | | | |
| Democratic gain from Republican | | | |

== District 10 ==
California's 10th congressional district election, 1948
| Party | Candidate | Votes | % |
|---|---|---|---|
| Republican | Thomas H. Werdel | 67,448 | 71.3 |
| Progressive | Sam James Miller | 27,168 | 28.7 |
| Total votes | | 94,616 | 100.0 |
| Turnout | | | |
| Republican gain from Democratic | | | |

== District 11 ==
California's 11th congressional district election, 1948
| Party | Candidate | Votes | % |
|---|---|---|---|
| Republican | Ernest K. Bramblett (incumbent) | 87,143 | 80.8 |
| Progressive | Cole Weston | 14,582 | 13.5 |
| Democratic | George E. Outland (write-in) | 6,157 | 5.7 |
| Total votes | | 107,882 | 100.0 |
| Turnout | | | |
| Republican hold | | | |

== District 12 ==
California's 12th congressional district election, 1948
| Party | Candidate | Votes | % |
|---|---|---|---|
| Republican | Richard Nixon (incumbent) | 141,509 | 87.8 |
| Progressive | Una W. Rice | 19,631 | 12.2 |
| Total votes | | 161,140 | 100.0 |
| Turnout | | | |
| Republican hold | | | |

== District 13 ==
California's 13th congressional district election, 1948
| Party | Candidate | Votes | % |
|---|---|---|---|
| Republican | Norris Poulson (incumbent) | 62,951 | 52.6 |
| Democratic | Ned R. Healy | 56,624 | 47.4 |
| Total votes | | 119,575 | 100.0 |
| Turnout | | | |
| Republican hold | | | |

== District 14 ==
California's 14th congressional district election, 1948
| Party | Candidate | Votes | % |
|---|---|---|---|
| Democratic | Helen Gahagan Douglas (incumbent) | 89,581 | 65.3 |
| Republican | W. Wallace Braden | 44,611 | 32.5 |
| Progressive | Sidney Moore | 2,904 | 2.2 |
| Total votes | | 137,096 | 100.0 |
| Turnout | | | |
| Democratic hold | | | |

== District 15 ==
California's 15th congressional district election, 1948
| Party | Candidate | Votes | % |
|---|---|---|---|
| Republican | Gordon L. McDonough (incumbent) | 131,933 | 83 |
| Progressive | Maynard J. Omerberg | 27,007 | 17 |
| Total votes | | 158,940 | 100 |
| Turnout | | | |
| Republican hold | | | |

== District 16 ==
California's 16th congressional district election, 1948
| Party | Candidate | Votes | % |
|---|---|---|---|
| Republican | Donald L. Jackson (incumbent) | 121,198 | 57 |
| Democratic | Ellis E. Patterson | 91,268 | 43 |
| Total votes | | 212,466 | 100 |
| Turnout | | | |
| Republican hold | | | |

== District 17 ==
California's 17th congressional district election, 1948
| Party | Candidate | Votes | % |
|---|---|---|---|
| Democratic | Cecil R. King (incumbent) | 194,782 | 100.0 |
| Turnout | | | |
| Democratic hold | | | |

== District 18 ==
California's 18th congressional district election, 1948
| Party | Candidate | Votes | % |
|---|---|---|---|
| Democratic | Clyde Doyle | 105,687 | 51.1 |
| Republican | Willis W. Bradley (incumbent) | 92,721 | 44.9 |
| Progressive | Stanley Moffatt | 8,232 | 4.0 |
| Total votes | | 206,640 | 100.0 |
| Turnout | | | |
| Democratic gain from Republican | | | |

== District 19 ==
California's 19th congressional district election, 1948
| Party | Candidate | Votes | % |
|---|---|---|---|
| Democratic | Chet Holifield (incumbent) | 72,900 | 69.7 |
| Republican | Joseph Francis Quigley | 28,698 | 27.5 |
| Progressive | Jacob Berman | 1,915 | 1.8 |
| Independent | Myra Tanner Weiss | 1,013 | 1.0 |
| Total votes | | 104,526 | 100.0 |
| Turnout | | | |
| Democratic hold | | | |

== District 20 ==
California's 20th congressional district election, 1948
| Party | Candidate | Votes | % |
|---|---|---|---|
| Republican | John Carl Hinshaw (incumbent) | 204,710 | 81.6 |
| Democratic | William B. Esterman | 46,232 | 18.4 |
| Total votes | | 250,942 | 100.0 |
| Turnout | | | |
| Republican hold | | | |

== District 21 ==
California's 21st congressional district election, 1948
| Party | Candidate | Votes | % |
|---|---|---|---|
| Democratic | Harry R. Sheppard (incumbent) | 61,383 | 55.2 |
| Republican | Lowell E. Lathrop | 47,411 | 42.6 |
| Progressive | Howard J. Louks | 2,422 | 2.2 |
| Total votes | | 111,216 | 100.0 |
| Turnout | | | |
| Democratic hold | | | |

== District 22 ==
California's 22nd congressional district election, 1948
| Party | Candidate | Votes | % |
|---|---|---|---|
| Republican | John J. Phillips (incumbent) | 115,697 | 100.0 |
| Turnout | | | |
| Republican hold | | | |

== District 23 ==
California's 23rd congressional district election, 1948
| Party | Candidate | Votes | % |
|---|---|---|---|
| Democratic | Clinton D. McKinnon | 112,534 | 55.8 |
| Republican | Charles K. Fletcher (incumbent) | 87,138 | 43.2 |
| Progressive | Harry C. Steinmetz | 2,017 | 1.0 |
| Total votes | | 201,689 | 100.0 |
| Turnout | | | |
| Democratic gain from Republican | | | |

== See also ==
- 81st United States Congress
- Political party strength in California
- Political party strength in U.S. states
- 1948 United States House of Representatives elections
