= 1952 United States House of Representatives elections in California =

- November 4, 1952

All 30 California seats to the United States House of Representatives
	Majority party	Minority party	Third party
Party	Republican	Democratic	Progressive
Last election	13	10	0
Seats won	19	11	0
Seat change	▲6	▲1	Steady
Popular vote	2,388,038	2,027,751	139,398
Percentage	52.37%	44.47%	3.06%
- Democratic gain Republican gain Democratic hold Republican hold

The United States House of Representatives elections in California, 1952 was an election for California's delegation to the United States House of Representatives, which occurred as part of the general election of the House of Representatives on November 4, 1952. California gained seven seats as a result of the 1950 census, five of which were won by Republicans and two by Democrats. Of California's existing districts, Republicans won two Democratic-held seats.

== Overview ==
United States House of Representatives elections in California, 1952
Party	Votes	%	Before	After	+/–
Republican	2,388,038	52.37%	13	19	+6
Democratic	2,027,751	44.47%	10	11	+1
Progressive	139,398	3.06%	0	0	0
Independent	4,959	0.11%	0	0	0
Totals	4,560,146	100.0%	23	30	+7

== Results ==
Final results from the Clerk of the House of Representatives:

=== District 1 ===
California's 1st congressional district election, 1952
Party	Candidate	Votes	%
Republican	Hubert B. Scudder (incumbent)	137,801	86.4
Progressive	Carl Sullivan	21,734	13.6
Total votes		159,535	100.0
Turnout			
Republican hold			

=== District 2 ===
California's 2nd congressional district election, 1952
Party	Candidate	Votes	%
Democratic	Clair Engle (incumbent)	124,179	100.0
Turnout			
Democratic hold			

=== District 3 ===
California's 3rd congressional district election, 1952
Party	Candidate	Votes	%
Democratic	John E. Moss	87,335	50.8
Republican	Leslie E. Wood	82,133	47.8
Progressive	Helen C. Thomsen	2,443	1.4
Total votes		171,911	100.0
Turnout			
Democratic win (new seat)			

=== District 4 ===
California's 4th congressional district election, 1952
Party	Candidate	Votes	%
Republican	William S. Mailliard	102,359	55
Democratic	Franck R. Havenner (incumbent)	83,748	45
Total votes		186,107	100
Turnout			
Republican gain from Democratic			

=== District 5 ===
California's 5th congressional district election, 1952
Party	Candidate	Votes	%
Democratic	John F. Shelley (incumbent)	107,542	100.0
Turnout			
Democratic hold			

=== District 6 ===
California's 6th congressional district election, 1952
Party	Candidate	Votes	%
Democratic	Robert Condon	87,768	50.6
Republican	John F. Baldwin, Jr.	85,756	49.4
Total votes		173,524	100.0
Turnout			
Democratic win (new seat)			

=== District 7 ===
California's 7th congressional district election, 1952
Party	Candidate	Votes	%
Republican	John J. Allen, Jr. (incumbent)	120,666	84.3
Progressive	John Allen Johnson	22,408	15.7
Total votes		142,074	100.0
Turnout			
Republican hold			

=== District 8 ===
California's 8th congressional district election, 1952
Party	Candidate	Votes	%
Democratic	George P. Miller (incumbent)	156,445	100.0
Turnout			
Democratic hold			

=== District 9 ===
California's 9th congressional district election, 1952
Party	Candidate	Votes	%
Republican	J. Arthur Younger	71,426	53.1
Democratic	Harold F. Taggart	61,028	45.3
Progressive	Charles S. Brown	2,140	1.6
Total votes		134,594	100.0
Turnout			
Republican win (new seat)			

=== District 10 ===
California's 10th congressional district election, 1952
Party	Candidate	Votes	%
Republican	Charles S. Gubser	106,375	59.2
Democratic	Arthur L. Johnson	70,271	39.1
Progressive	Betsey K. Fisher	2,939	1.7
Total votes		179,585	100.0
Turnout			
Republican hold			

=== District 11 ===
California's 11th congressional district election, 1952
Party	Candidate	Votes	%
Republican	Justin L. Johnson (incumbent)	101,052	87.1
Progressive	Leslie B. Schilingheyde	14,999	12.9
Total votes		116,051	100.0
Turnout			
Republican hold			

=== District 12 ===
California's 12th congressional district election, 1952
Party	Candidate	Votes	%
Republican	Allan O. Hunter (incumbent)	103,587	100.0
Turnout			
Republican hold			

=== District 13 ===
California's 13th congressional district election, 1952
Party	Candidate	Votes	%
Republican	Ernest K. Bramblett (incumbent)	79,496	51
Democratic	Will Hays	76,516	49
Total votes		156,012	100
Turnout			
Republican hold			

=== District 14 ===
California's 14th congressional district election, 1952
Party	Candidate	Votes	%
Democratic	Harlan Hagen	70,809	51
Republican	Thomas H. Werdel (incumbent)	68,011	49
Total votes		138,820	100
Turnout			
Democratic gain from Republican			

=== District 15 ===
California's 15th congressional district election, 1952
Party	Candidate	Votes	%
Republican	Gordon L. McDonough (incumbent)	142,545	100.0
Turnout			
Republican hold			

=== District 16 ===
California's 16th congressional district election, 1952
Party	Candidate	Votes	%
Republican	Donald L. Jackson (incumbent)	79,127	59.7
Democratic	S. Mark Hogue	53,337	40.3
Total votes		132,464	100.0
Turnout			
Republican hold			

=== District 17 ===
California's 17th congressional district election, 1952
Party	Candidate	Votes	%
Democratic	Cecil R. King (incumbent)	114,650	54.6
Republican	Robert H. Finch	92,587	44.1
Progressive	Loyd C. Seelinger	2,738	1.3
Total votes		209,975	100.0
Turnout			
Democratic hold			

=== District 18 ===
California's 18th congressional district election, 1952
Party	Candidate	Votes	%
Republican	Craig Hosmer	90,438	55.5
Democratic	Joseph M. Kennick	72,457	44.5
Total votes		162,895	100.0
Turnout			
Republican win (new seat)			

=== District 19 ===
California's 19th congressional district election, 1952
Party	Candidate	Votes	%
Democratic	Chet Holifield (incumbent)	126,606	87.1
Progressive	Ida Alvarez	13,724	9.4
Independent	Milton Snipper	4,959	3.5
Total votes		145,289	100.0
Turnout			
Democratic hold			

=== District 20 ===
California's 20th congressional district election, 1952
Party	Candidate	Votes	%
Republican	John Carl Hinshaw (incumbent)	109,509	100.0
Turnout			
Republican hold			

=== District 21 ===
California's 21st congressional district election, 1952
Party	Candidate	Votes	%
Republican	Edgar W. Hiestand	112,100	53.6
Democratic	Everett G. Burkhalter	97,007	46.4
Total votes		209,107	100.0
Turnout			
Republican win (new seat)			

=== District 22 ===
California's 22nd congressional district election, 1952
Party	Candidate	Votes	%
Republican	Joseph F. Holt	85,039	60.5
Democratic	Dean E. McHenry	55,534	39.5
Total votes		140,573	100.0
Turnout			
Republican win (new seat)			

=== District 23 ===
California's 23rd congressional district election, 1952
Party	Candidate	Votes	%
Democratic	Clyde Doyle (incumbent)	138,356	87.5
Progressive	Olive T. Thompson	17,501	11.1
Republican	C. Cleveland (write-in)	2,329	1.4
Total votes		158,186	100.0
Turnout			
Democratic hold			

=== District 24 ===
California's 24th congressional district election, 1952
Party	Candidate	Votes	%
Republican	Norris Poulson (incumbent)	119,799	87.4
Progressive	Bertram L. Sharp	17,307	12.6
Total votes		137,106	100.0
Turnout			
Republican hold			

=== District 25 ===
California's 25th congressional district election, 1952
Party	Candidate	Votes	%
Republican	Patrick J. Hillings (incumbent)	135,465	64.3
Democratic	Woodrow Wilson Sayre	75,125	35.7
Total votes		210,590	100.0
Turnout			
Republican hold			

=== District 26 ===
California's 26th congressional district election, 1952
Party	Candidate	Votes	%
Democratic	Sam Yorty (incumbent)	157,973	88
Progressive	Horace V. Alexander	21,465	12
Total votes		179,438	100
Turnout			
Democratic hold			

=== District 27 ===
California's 27th congressional district election, 1952
Party	Candidate	Votes	%
Democratic	Harry R. Sheppard (incumbent)	68,773	55
Republican	Carl B. Hilliard	56,202	45
Total votes		124,975	100
Turnout			
Democratic hold			

=== District 28 ===
California's 28th congressional district election, 1952
Party	Candidate	Votes	%
Republican	James B. Utt	106,972	63
Democratic	Lionel Van Deerlin	62,779	37
Total votes		169,751	100.0
Turnout			
Republican win (new seat)			

=== District 29 ===
California's 29th congressional district election, 1952
Party	Candidate	Votes	%
Republican	John J. Phillips (incumbent)	73,144	100.0
Turnout			
Republican hold			

=== District 30 ===
California's 30th congressional district election, 1952
Party	Candidate	Votes	%
Republican	Bob Wilson	121,322	59.6
Democratic	De Graff Austin	82,311	40.4
Total votes		203,633	100.0
Turnout			
Republican win (new seat)			

== See also ==
- 83rd United States Congress
- Political party strength in California
- Political party strength in U.S. states
- 1952 United States House of Representatives elections
