= 1928 United States House of Representatives elections in California =

United States House of Representatives elections in California, 1928
- November 6, 1928

All 11 California seats to the United States House of Representatives
	Majority party	Minority party
Party	Republican	Democratic
Last election	10	1
Seats won	10	1
Seat change	Steady	Steady
Popular vote	1,127,910	172,250
Percentage	85.1%	13.0%
- Republican hold Democratic hold

The United States House of Representatives elections in California, 1928 was an election for California's delegation to the United States House of Representatives, which occurred as part of the general election of the House of Representatives on November 6, 1928. California's House delegation remained unchanged at 10 Republicans and 1 Democrat.

== Overview ==
United States House of Representatives elections in California, 1928
Party	Votes	Percentage	Seats
Republican	1,127,910	85.1%	10
Democratic	172,250	13.0%	1
Independent	16,838	1.3%	0
Socialist	8,090	0.6%	0
Totals	1,325,088	100.0%	11

== Results ==
Final results from the Clerk of the House of Representatives:

=== District 1 ===
California's 1st congressional district election, 1928
Party	Candidate	Votes	%
Democratic	Clarence F. Lea (incumbent)	56,381	100.0
Turnout			
Democratic hold			

=== District 2 ===
California's 2nd congressional district election, 1928
Party	Candidate	Votes	%
Republican	Harry Lane Englebright (incumbent)	32,455	100.0
Turnout			
Republican hold			

=== District 3 ===
California's 3rd congressional district election, 1928
Party	Candidate	Votes	%
Republican	Charles F. Curry (incumbent)	77,750	100.0
Turnout			
Republican hold			

=== District 4 ===
California's 4th congressional district election, 1928
Party	Candidate	Votes	%
Republican	Florence Prag Kahn (incumbent)	50,206	76
Independent	Harry W. Hutton	16,838	24
Total votes		67,044	100
Turnout			
Republican hold			

=== District 5 ===
California's 5th congressional district election, 1928
Party	Candidate	Votes	%
Republican	Richard J. Welch (incumbent)	51,708	100.0
Turnout			
Republican hold			

=== District 6 ===
California's 6th congressional district election, 1928
Party	Candidate	Votes	%
Republican	Albert E. Carter (incumbent)	113,579	100.0
Turnout			
Republican hold			

=== District 7 ===
California's 7th congressional district election, 1928
Party	Candidate	Votes	%
Republican	Henry E. Barbour (incumbent)	71,195	100.0
Turnout			
Republican hold			

=== District 8 ===
California's 8th congressional district election, 1928
Party	Candidate	Votes	%
Republican	Arthur M. Free (incumbent)	80,613	68
Democratic	Cecelia M. Casserly	37,947	32
Total votes		118,560	100
Turnout			
Republican hold			

=== District 9 ===
California's 9th congressional district election, 1928
Party	Candidate	Votes	%
Republican	William E. Evans (incumbent)	222,261	77.0
Democratic	James B. Ogg	58,263	20.2
Socialist	Christian Sorenson	8,090	2.8
Total votes		288,614	100.0
Turnout			
Republican hold			

=== District 10 ===
California's 10th congressional district election, 1928
Party	Candidate	Votes	%
Republican	Joe Crail (incumbent)	301,028	93.9
Democratic	Harry Sherr	19,659	6.1
Total votes		320,687	100.0
Turnout			
Republican hold			

=== District 11 ===
California's 11th congressional district election, 1928
Party	Candidate	Votes	%
Republican	Philip D. Swing (incumbent)	127,115	100.0
Turnout			
Republican hold			

== See also ==
- 71st United States Congress
- Political party strength in California
- Political party strength in U.S. states
- 1928 United States House of Representatives elections
