= Harry R. Sheppard =

American politician

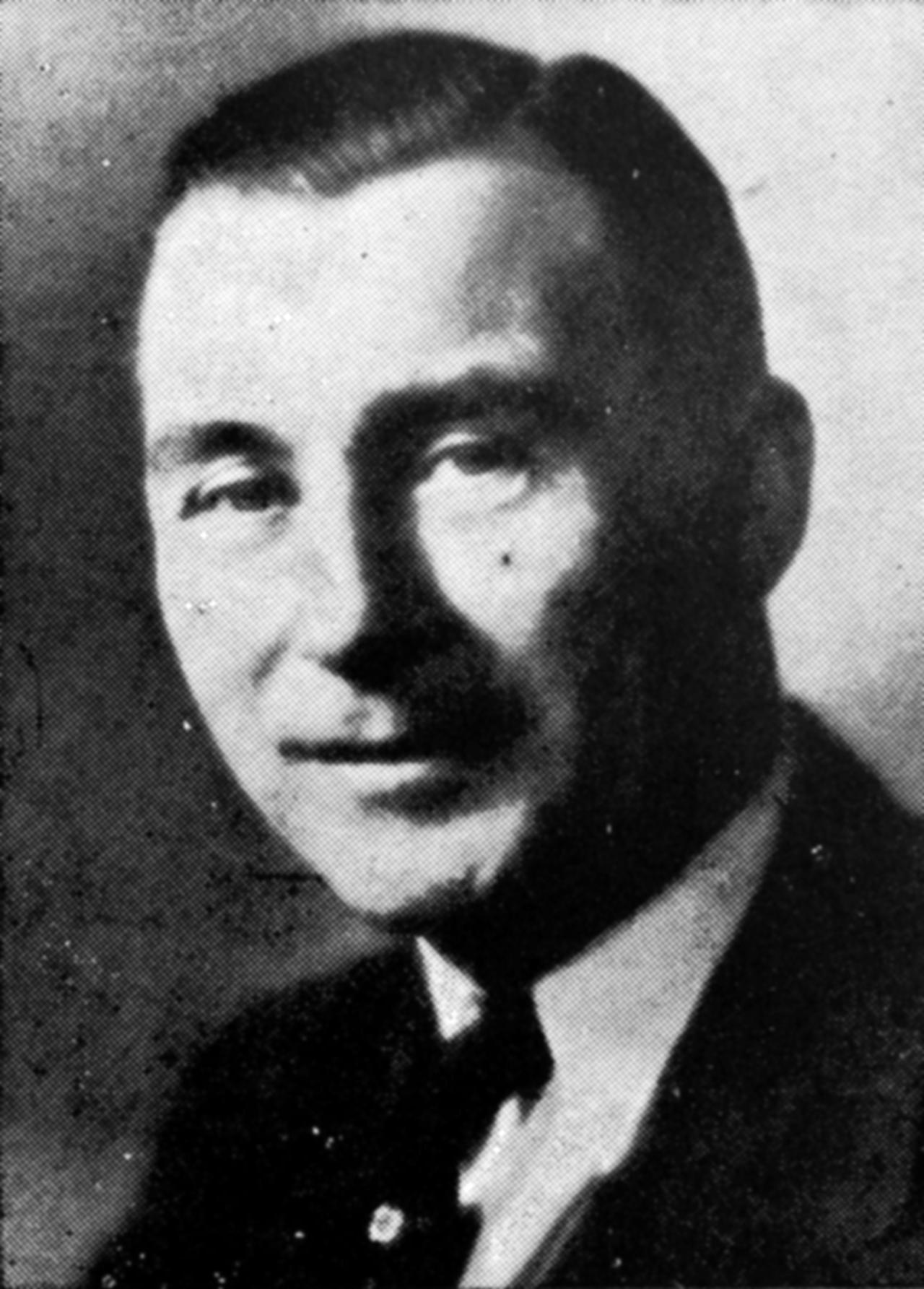
- Sheppard c. 1940

Member of the U.S. House of Representatives from California
- In office January 3, 1937 – January 3, 1965
- Preceded by: Sam L. Collins
- Succeeded by: Kenneth W. Dyal
- Constituency: 19th district (1937–1943); 21st district (1943–1953); 27th district (1953–1963); 33rd district (1963–1965)

Personal details
- Born: Harry Richard Sheppard; January 10, 1885 Mobile, Alabama, U.S.
- Died: April 28, 1969 (aged 84) Washington, D.C., U.S.
- Resting place: National Memorial Park, Falls Church, Virginia
- Party: Democratic

Harry Richard Sheppard (January 10, 1885 – April 28, 1969) was an American businessman and politician who served 14 terms as a U.S. representative from California, from 1937 to 1965.

== Biography ==
Born in Mobile, Alabama, Sheppard attended public schools and studied law.

He then was employed in the transportation department of the Santa Fe Railroad and was an active committee member of the Brotherhood of Railroad Trainmen. He also engaged in the copper business in Alaska and served as president and general manager of King's Beverage and King's Laboratories Corps. of California prior to 1934.

=== Congress ===
Sheppard was elected as a Democrat to the 75th United States Congress and to the thirteen succeeding Congresses. When he retired at the time of the 1964 elections, he was the dean of California's congressional delegation.

During his time as a Congressman, his voting record was a mainly liberal one.

=== Death ===
He died in Washington, D.C., on April 28, 1969, and was interred in National Memorial Park in nearby Falls Church, Virginia.

== Electoral results ==
Harry R. Sheppard electoral history

1936 United States House of Representatives elections in California
Party	Candidate	Votes	%
Democratic	Harry R. Sheppard	70,339	53.8
Republican	Sam L. Collins (Incumbent)	59,071	45.2
Communist	Charles McLauchlan	1,336	1.0
Total votes		130,746	100.0
Turnout			
Democratic gain from Republican			

1938 United States House of Representatives elections in California
Party	Candidate	Votes	%
Democratic	Harry R. Sheppard (Incumbent)	75,819	53.3
Republican	C. T. Johnson	66,402	46.7
Total votes		142,221	100.0
Turnout			
Democratic hold			

1940 United States House of Representatives elections in California
Party	Candidate	Votes	%
Democratic	Harry R. Sheppard (Incumbent)	84,931	52.9
Republican	Lotus H. Loudon	75,495	47.1
Total votes		160,426	100.0
Turnout			
Democratic hold			

1942 United States House of Representatives elections in California, 21st district
Party	Candidate	Votes	%
Democratic	Harry R. Sheppard (Incumbent)	38,419	96.6
Republican	Arthur E. Isham (write-in)	1,350	3.4
Total votes		39,769	100.0
Turnout			
Democratic hold			

1944 United States House of Representatives elections in California, 21st district
Party	Candidate	Votes	%
Democratic	Harry R. Sheppard (Incumbent)	48,539	58.5
Republican	Earl S. Webb	34,409	41.5
Total votes		82,948	100.0
Turnout			
Democratic hold			

1946 United States House of Representatives elections in California, 21st district
Party	Candidate	Votes	%
Democratic	Harry R. Sheppard (Incumbent)	37,229	52.7
Republican	Lowell E. Lathrop	33,395	47.3
Total votes		70,624	100.0
Turnout			
Democratic hold			

1948 United States House of Representatives elections in California, 21st district
Party	Candidate	Votes	%
Democratic	Harry R. Sheppard (Incumbent)	61,383	55.2
Republican	Lowell E. Lathrop	47,411	42.6
Progressive	Howard J. Louks	2,422	2.2
Total votes		111,216	100.0
Turnout			
Democratic hold			

1950 United States House of Representatives elections in California, 21st district
Party	Candidate	Votes	%
Democratic	Harry R. Sheppard (Incumbent)	62,994	57.4
Republican	R. E. Reynolds	46,693	42.6
Total votes		109,687	100.0
Turnout			
Democratic hold			

1952 United States House of Representatives elections in California
Party	Candidate	Votes	%
Democratic	Harry R. Sheppard (Incumbent)	68,773	55.0
Republican	Carl B. Hilliard	56,202	45.0
Total votes		124,975	100.0
Democratic hold			

1954 United States House of Representatives elections in California
Party	Candidate	Votes	%
Democratic	Harry R. Sheppard (Incumbent)	65,389	64.8
Republican	Martin K. Barrett	35,594	35.2
Total votes		100,983	100.0
Democratic hold			

1956 United States House of Representatives elections in California
Party	Candidate	Votes	%
Democratic	Harry R. Sheppard (Incumbent)	124,662	100.0
Democratic hold			

1958 United States House of Representatives elections in California
Party	Candidate	Votes	%
Democratic	Harry R. Sheppard (Incumbent)	105,062	72.3
Republican	Robert M. Castle	40,317	27.7
Total votes		145,379	100.0
Democratic hold			

1960 United States House of Representatives elections in California
Party	Candidate	Votes	%
Democratic	Harry R. Sheppard (Incumbent)	123,645	66.8
Republican	Robert M. Castle	61,484	33.2
Total votes		185,129	100.0
Democratic hold			

1962 United States House of Representatives elections in California
Party	Candidate	Votes	%
Democratic	Harry R. Sheppard (Incumbent)	96,192	59.0
Republican	William R. Thomas	66,764	41.0
Total votes		162,956	100.0
Democratic hold			

U.S. House of Representatives
Preceded by Sam L. Collins	Member of the U.S. House of Representatives from California's 19th congressional district 1937–1943	Succeeded by Chet Holifield
New district	Member of the U.S. House of Representatives from California's 21st congressional district 1943–1953	Succeeded by Edgar W. Hiestand
New district	Member of the U.S. House of Representatives from California's 27th congressional district 1953–1963	Succeeded by Everett G. Burkhalter
New district	Member of the U.S. House of Representatives from California's 33rd congressional district 1963–1965	Succeeded by Kenneth W. Dyal
