= 1940 United States House of Representatives elections in California =

- November 5, 1940

All 20 California seats to the United States House of Representatives
	Majority party	Minority party
Party	Republican	Democratic
Last election	8	11
Seats won	9	10
Seat change	▲1	▼1
Popular vote	1,473,115	1,183,980
Percentage	53.19%	42.75%
- Republican gain Democratic hold Republican hold

The United States House of Representatives elections in California, 1940 was an election for California's delegation to the United States House of Representatives, which occurred as part of the general election of the House of Representatives on November 5, 1940. Republicans gained one districts.

== Overview ==
United States House of Representatives elections in California, 1940
Party	Votes	Percentage	Seats	+/–
Republican	1,473,115	53.2%	10	+1
Democratic	1,183,980	42.8%	10	-1
Communist	57,718	2.1%	0	0
Prohibition	46,945	1.7%	0	0
Progressive	5,649	0.2%	0	0
Independent	1,950	0.1%	0	0
Totals	2,769,357	100.0%	20	—

== Delegation composition ==
Pre-election	Seats
Democratic-Held	12
Republican-Held	8

Post-election	Seats
Democratic-Held	10
Republican-Held	10

== Results ==
Final results from the Clerk of the House of Representatives:

=== District 1 ===
California's 1st congressional district election, 1940
Party	Candidate	Votes	%
Democratic	Clarence F. Lea (incumbent)	103,547	93.3
Communist	Albert J. Lima	5,647	5.1
Independent	Ernest S. Mitchell (write-in)	1,828	1.6
Total votes		111,022	100.0
Turnout			
Democratic hold			

=== District 2 ===
California's 2nd congressional district election, 1940
Party	Candidate	Votes	%
Republican	Harry Lane Englebright (incumbent)	71,033	100.0
Turnout			
Republican hold			

=== District 3 ===
California's 3rd congressional district election, 1940
Party	Candidate	Votes	%
Democratic	Frank H. Buck (incumbent)	135,461	91.0
Prohibition	C. H. Farman	10,539	7.1
Communist	Charles Gricus	2,751	1.8
Independent	George Kimber (write-in)	122	0.1
Total votes		148,873	100.0
Turnout			
Democratic hold			

=== District 4 ===
California's 4th congressional district election, 1940
Party	Candidate	Votes	%
Republican	Thomas Rolph	75,369	54.6
Democratic	Franck R. Havenner (incumbent)	61,341	44.4
Communist	Archie Brown	1,322	1.0
Total votes		138,032	100.0
Turnout			
Republican gain from Democratic			

=== District 5 ===
California's 5th congressional district election, 1940
Party	Candidate	Votes	%
Republican	Richard J. Welch (incumbent)	119,122	95.8
Communist	Walter R. Lambert	5,232	4.2
Total votes		124,354	100.0
Turnout			
Republican hold			

=== District 6 ===
California's 6th congressional district election, 1940
Party	Candidate	Votes	%
Republican	Albert E. Carter (incumbent)	131,584	96
Communist	Clarence Paton	5,426	4
Total votes		137,010	100
Turnout			
Republican hold			

=== District 7 ===
California's 7th congressional district election, 1940
Party	Candidate	Votes	%
Democratic	John H. Tolan (incumbent)	72,838	55.5
Republican	Ralph R. Eltse	56,808	43.2
Communist	Alfred N. Johnson	1,707	1.3
Total votes		131,353	100.0
Turnout			
Democratic hold			

=== District 8 ===
California's 8th congressional district election, 1940
Party	Candidate	Votes	%
Republican	Jack Z. Anderson (incumbent)	148,180	96.7
Communist	Elizabeth Nichols	5,186	3.3
Democratic	J. J. McGrath (write-in)	37	0.1
Total votes		153,403	100.0
Turnout			
Republican hold			

=== District 9 ===
California's 9th congressional district election, 1940
Party	Candidate	Votes	%
Republican	Bertrand W. Gearhart (incumbent)	99,708	100.0
Turnout			
Republican hold			

=== District 10 ===
California's 10th congressional district election, 1940
Party	Candidate	Votes	%
Democratic	Alfred J. Elliott (incumbent)	125,845	97
Communist	Louretta Adams	3,826	3
Total votes		129,671	100
Turnout			
Democratic hold			

=== District 11 ===
California's 11th congressional district election, 1940
Party	Candidate	Votes	%
Republican	John Carl Hinshaw (incumbent)	170,504	96.6
Communist	Orla E. Lair	6,003	3.4
Total votes		176,507	100.0
Turnout			
Republican hold			

=== District 12 ===
California's 12th congressional district election, 1940
Party	Candidate	Votes	%
Democratic	Jerry Voorhis (incumbent)	99,494	64.0
Republican	Eugene W. Nixon	54,731	35.2
Communist	Albert Lewis	1,152	0.8
Total votes		155,377	100.0
Turnout			
Democratic hold			

=== District 13 ===
California's 13th congressional district election, 1940
Party	Candidate	Votes	%
Democratic	Charles Kramer (incumbent)	127,167	75.7
Prohibition	Charles H. Randall	36,406	21.7
Communist	Celeste Strack	4,434	2.6
Total votes		168,007	100.0
Turnout			
Democratic hold			

=== District 14 ===
California's 14th congressional district election, 1940
Party	Candidate	Votes	%
Democratic	Thomas F. Ford (incumbent)	73,137	64.3
Republican	Herbert L. Herberts	37,939	33.3
Communist	Pettis Perry	2,732	2.4
Total votes		113,808	100.0
Turnout			
Democratic hold			

=== District 15 ===
California's 15th congressional district election, 1940
Party	Candidate	Votes	%
Democratic	John M. Costello (incumbent)	94,435	56.2
Republican	Norris J. Nelson	71,667	42.6
Communist	Emil Freed	2,004	1.2
Total votes		168,106	100.0
Turnout			
Democratic hold			

=== District 16 ===
California's 16th congressional district election, 1940
Party	Candidate	Votes	%
Republican	Leland M. Ford (incumbent)	188,049	96.4
Communist	George C. Sandy	7,017	3.6
Total votes		195,066	100.0
Turnout			
Republican hold			

=== District 17 ===
California's 17th congressional district election, 1940
Party	Candidate	Votes	%
Democratic	Lee E. Geyer (incumbent)	75,109	65.5
Republican	Clifton A. Hix	32,862	28.6
Progressive Party (United States, 1924)	Samuel C. Converse	5,649	4.9
Communist	Harry L. Gray	1,118	1.0
Total votes		114,738	100.0
Turnout			
Democratic hold			

=== District 18 ===
California's 18th congressional district election, 1940
Party	Candidate	Votes	%
Republican	William Ward Johnson (incumbent)	73,932	54.4
Democratic	Byron N. Scott	60,764	44.7
Communist	George R. Ashby	1,355	0.9
Total votes		136,051	100.0
Turnout			
Republican hold			

=== District 19 ===
California's 19th congressional district election, 1940
Party	Candidate	Votes	%
Democratic	Harry R. Sheppard (incumbent)	84,931	52.9
Republican	Lotus H. Loudon	75,495	47.1
Total votes		160,426	100.0
Turnout			
Democratic hold			

=== District 20 ===
California's 20th congressional district election, 1940
Party	Candidate	Votes	%
Democratic	Edouard Izac (incumbent)	69,874	51.1
Republican	Ed Fletcher	66,132	48.3
Communist	Esco L. Richardson	806	0.6
Total votes		136,812	100.0
Turnout			
Democratic hold			

== See also ==
- 77th United States Congress
- Political party strength in California
- Political party strength in U.S. states
- 1940 United States House of Representatives elections
