= Richard J. Welch =

American politician (1869–1949)

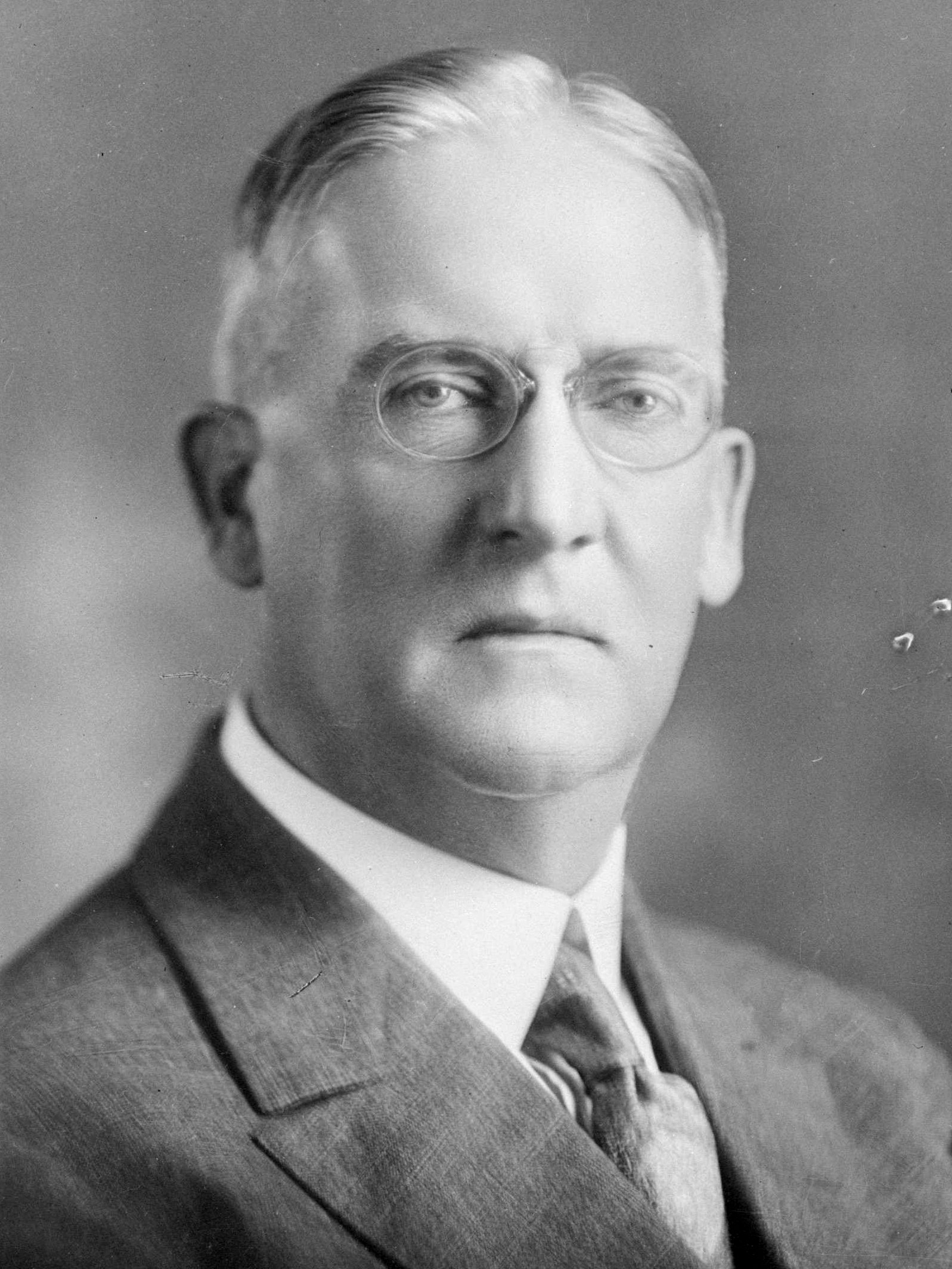
- Welch c. 1932

Member of the U.S. House of Representatives from California's 5th district
- In office August 31, 1926 – September 10, 1949
- Preceded by: Lawrence J. Flaherty
- Succeeded by: John F. Shelley

Member of the San Francisco Board of Supervisors
- In office January 8, 1916 – September 30, 1926
- Preceded by: Henry Payot
- Succeeded by: Frank J. McGovern

Member of the California Senate from the 19th district
- In office January 1, 1901 – January 6, 1913
- Preceded by: Lawrence J. Dwyer
- Succeeded by: Edwin Grant

Personal details
- Born: Richard Joseph Welch; February 13, 1869 Monroe County, New York, U.S.
- Died: September 10, 1949 (aged 80) Needles, California, U.S.
- Resting place: Holy Cross Cemetery
- Party: Republican
- Other political affiliations: Union Labor
- Spouse: Sarah O'Connor Welch
- Children: Garrett Welch

Richard Joseph Welch (February 13, 1869 – September 10, 1949) was an American laborer, clerk and politician who served in the United States House of Representatives for 12 terms from 1926 to 1949, representing San Francisco, California. He previously served in the California State Senate and the San Francisco Board of Supervisors. As of 2025, he is the last Republican to represent San Francisco in the House.

== Early life ==
Welch was born in Monroe County, New York and educated in the public schools. He moved to California in 1885 and worked on a farm in Freeport before settling in the South of Market neighborhood of San Francisco. There he apprenticed as an iron molder at the Union Iron Works, training himself to become a machinist. When the workers there went on strike, he joined them. He was later appointed a clerk of the San Francisco County Superior Court in 1894, serving in that position for the next six years.

== Early political career ==
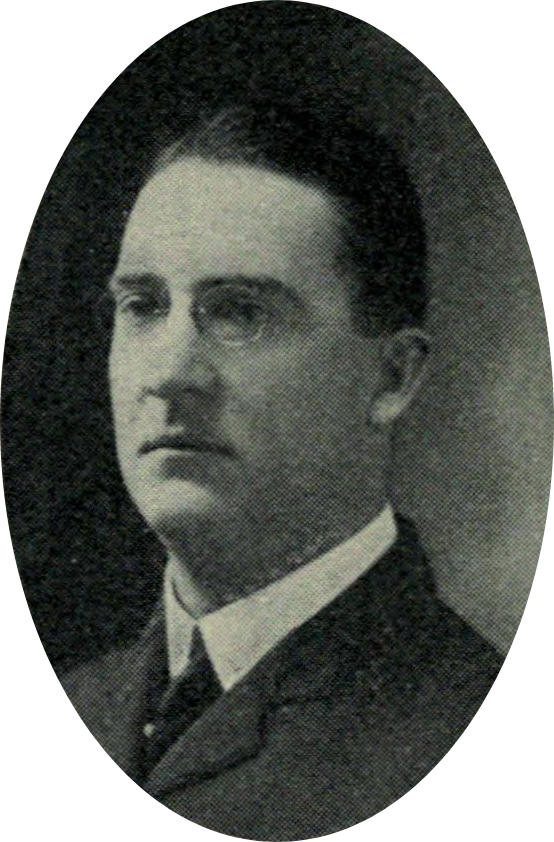
Welch's official State Senate portrait, 1903

Welch became active in politics as a Republican, including serving as treasurer of his local Republican Club, helping organize events for the McKinley/Hobart ticket during the 1896 presidential campaign, and organizing San Francisco's Dewey Republican Club in 1898.

Welch was elected to the California State Senate in 1900, serving from 1901 to 1913. During this time he was appointed Chief Wharfinger of the Port of San Francisco, serving from 1903 to 1907. He also served on the San Francisco Board of Supervisors from 1916 until September 30, 1926, when he resigned, having been elected to Congress.

Following the rise of the Union Labor Party in the city, Welch opposed their mayoral candidates and the influence of the party's boss, Abe Ruef, on the local Republican Party. Relations between the pro- and anti-Ruef factions were "good-natured" however, and after Welch made amends the Union Labor Party endorsed him for reelection in 1904 and 1908.

== Congressional career ==
Welch addresses a National Recovery Administration rally in the Mission District of San Francisco, August 31, 1933

Welch was elected to the Sixty-ninth Congress to fill the vacancy caused by the death of Lawrence J. Flaherty. He was re-elected to the Seventieth and to the eleven succeeding Congresses and served from August 31, 1926, until his death in 1949. He was succeeded by John F. Shelley and was the last Republican to hold this seat.

During his tenure, Welch served as chairman of the Committee on Labor (Seventy-first Congress), and the Committee on Public Lands (Eightieth Congress). He successfully introduced the Filipino Repatriation Act of 1935, which intended to exclude Filipinos from immigrating to the United States and repatriate those who wished to return.

== Death ==
Welch died in a hospital in Needles, California on September 10, 1949 at the age of 80. His body was interred at Holy Cross Cemetery in Colma, California.

== Electoral history ==
Richard J. Welch electoral history

Republican Richard J. Welch won the 1926 special election to replace fellow Republican Lawrence J. Flaherty, who died in office. Data for this special election is not available.

1926 United States House of Representatives elections in California
Party	Candidate	Votes	%
Republican	Richard J. Welch (Incumbent)	47,694	100.0
Turnout			
Republican hold			

1928 United States House of Representatives elections in California
Party	Candidate	Votes	%
Republican	Richard J. Welch (Incumbent)	51,708	100.0
Turnout			
Republican hold			

1930 United States House of Representatives elections in California
Party	Candidate	Votes	%
Republican	Richard J. Welch (Incumbent)	59,853	100.0
Turnout			
Republican hold			

1932 United States House of Representatives elections in California
Party	Candidate	Votes	%
Republican	Richard J. Welch (Incumbent)	67,349	100.0
Turnout			
Republican hold			

1934 United States House of Representatives elections in California
Party	Candidate	Votes	%
Republican	Richard J. Welch (Incumbent)	89,751	93.8
Communist	Alexander Noral	5,933	6.2
Total votes		95,684	100.0
Turnout			
Republican hold			

1936 United States House of Representatives elections in California
Party	Candidate	Votes	%
Republican	Richard J. Welch (Incumbent)	82,910	94.8
Communist	Lawrence Ross	4,545	5.2
Total votes		87,455	100.0
Turnout			
Republican hold			

1938 United States House of Representatives elections in California
Party	Candidate	Votes	%
Republican	Richard J. Welch (Incumbent)	91,868	100.0
Turnout			
Republican hold			

1940 United States House of Representatives elections in California
Party	Candidate	Votes	%
Republican	Richard J. Welch (Incumbent)	119,122	95.8
Communist	Walter R. Lambert	5,232	4.2
Total votes		124,354	100.0
Turnout			
Republican hold			

1942 United States House of Representatives elections in California
Party	Candidate	Votes	%
Republican	Richard J. Welch (Incumbent)	85,747	92.7
Communist	Walter R. Lambert	6,749	7.3
Total votes		92,496	100.0
Turnout			
Republican hold			

1944 United States House of Representatives elections in California
Party	Candidate	Votes	%
Republican	Richard J. Welch (Incumbent)	112,151	100.0
Turnout			
Republican hold			

1946 United States House of Representatives elections in California
Party	Candidate	Votes	%
Republican	Richard J. Welch (Incumbent)	94,293	100.0
Turnout			
Republican hold			

1948 United States House of Representatives elections in California
Party	Candidate	Votes	%
Republican	Richard J. Welch (Incumbent)	116,347	100.0
Turnout			
Republican hold			

== See also ==
- List of members of the United States Congress who died in office (1900–1949)

U.S. House of Representatives
Preceded by Lawrence J. Flaherty	Member of the U.S. House of Representatives from California's 5th congressional district August 31, 1926 – September 10, 1949	Succeeded by John F. Shelley
