= Ernest K. Bramblett =

American politician (1901–1966)

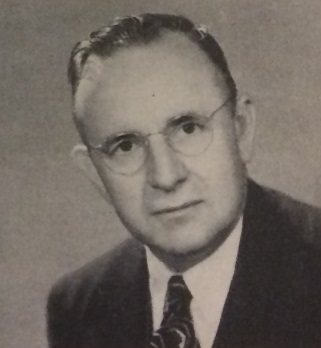

Member of the U.S. House of Representatives from California
- In office January 3, 1947 – January 3, 1955
- Preceded by: George E. Outland
- Succeeded by: Charles M. Teague
- Constituency: 11th district (1947–1953); 13th district (1953–1955)

Personal details
- Born: Ernest King Bramblett; April 25, 1901 Fresno, California, U.S.
- Died: December 27, 1966 (aged 65) Woodland Hills, California, U.S.
- Resting place: Oakwood Memorial Park Cemetery
- Party: Republican
- Education: Stanford University (BA)

Ernest King Bramblett (April 25, 1901 – December 27, 1966) was an American Republican politician who represented California's Central Coast in the U.S. House of Representatives from 1947 to 1955 when he was convicted of fraud. He was elected to the U.S. House in the 1946 Republican landslide when he ousted Democratic incumbent Rep. George Outland.

== Biography ==
Born in Fresno, California, Bramblett graduated from Stanford University in 1925 with a Bachelor of Arts degree in education, and later attended several other colleges for post-graduate work. He worked in insurance sales and car sales before becoming a high school teacher, principal and administrator. From 1943 to 1946 he was responsible for coordinating the curriculum between high schools and elementary schools of the Monterey County school system.

=== Early political career ===
A Republican, Bramblett was Mayor of Pacific Grove from 1939 to 1947, and a member of California's Republican Central Committee from 1944 to 1946.

=== Congress ===
In 1946, Bramblett was elected to the 80th United States Congress. He was reelected three times, and served from January 3, 1947, to January 3, 1955. He was not a candidate for renomination in 1954. Bramblett had two bills enacted dealing with surplus farm labor camps and spoke on the floor a total of nine times in eight years.

== Conviction ==
In February 1954, Bramblett was convicted of several charges related to payroll fraud with his Congressional staff; he paid salaries to four individuals who did no work for him. They returned the money to Bramblett so he could convert it to his personal use. He was sentenced to four months to a year in prison, which was suspended. He was also fined $5,000, and was placed on probation for a year. The federal government later sued to recoup the money he had acquired from his fraud, and obtained a judgment against him.

=== Later years ===
After his conviction, Bramblett became a government affairs consultant in southern California, and was a resident of Woodland Hills.

== Death and burial ==
He died in Woodland Hills on December 27, 1966, and was buried at Oakwood Memorial Park Cemetery in Chatsworth.

== Electoral history ==
1946 United States House of Representatives elections in California
Party	Candidate	Votes	%
Republican	Ernest K. Bramblett	41,902	53.1
Democratic	George E. Outland (Incumbent)	36,996	46.9
Total votes		78,898	100.0
Turnout			
Republican gain from Democratic			

1948 United States House of Representatives elections in California
Party	Candidate	Votes	%
Republican	Ernest K. Bramblett (Incumbent)	87,143	80.8
Progressive	Cole Weston	14,582	13.5
Democratic	George E. Outland (write-in)	6,157	5.7
Total votes		107,882	100.0
Turnout			
Republican hold			

1950 United States House of Representatives elections in California
Party	Candidate	Votes	%
Republican	Ernest K. Bramblett (Incumbent)	59,780	52.1
Democratic	Ardis M. Walker	55,020	47.9
Total votes		114,800	100.0
Turnout			
Republican hold			

1952 United States House of Representatives elections in California
Party	Candidate	Votes	%
Republican	Ernest K. Bramblett (Incumbent)	79,496	51
Democratic	Will Hays	76,516	49
Total votes		156,012	100
Turnout			
Republican hold			

== See also ==
- California's congressional delegations
- List of American federal politicians convicted of crimes
- List of federal political scandals in the United States

U.S. House of Representatives
Preceded by George E. Outland	Member of the U.S. House of Representatives from California's 11th congressional district 1947–1953	Succeeded by Justin L. Johnson
Preceded by C. Norris Poulson	Member of the U.S. House of Representatives from California's 13th congressional district 1953–1955	Succeeded by Charles M. Teague
