= George E. Outland =

American politician

George Outland
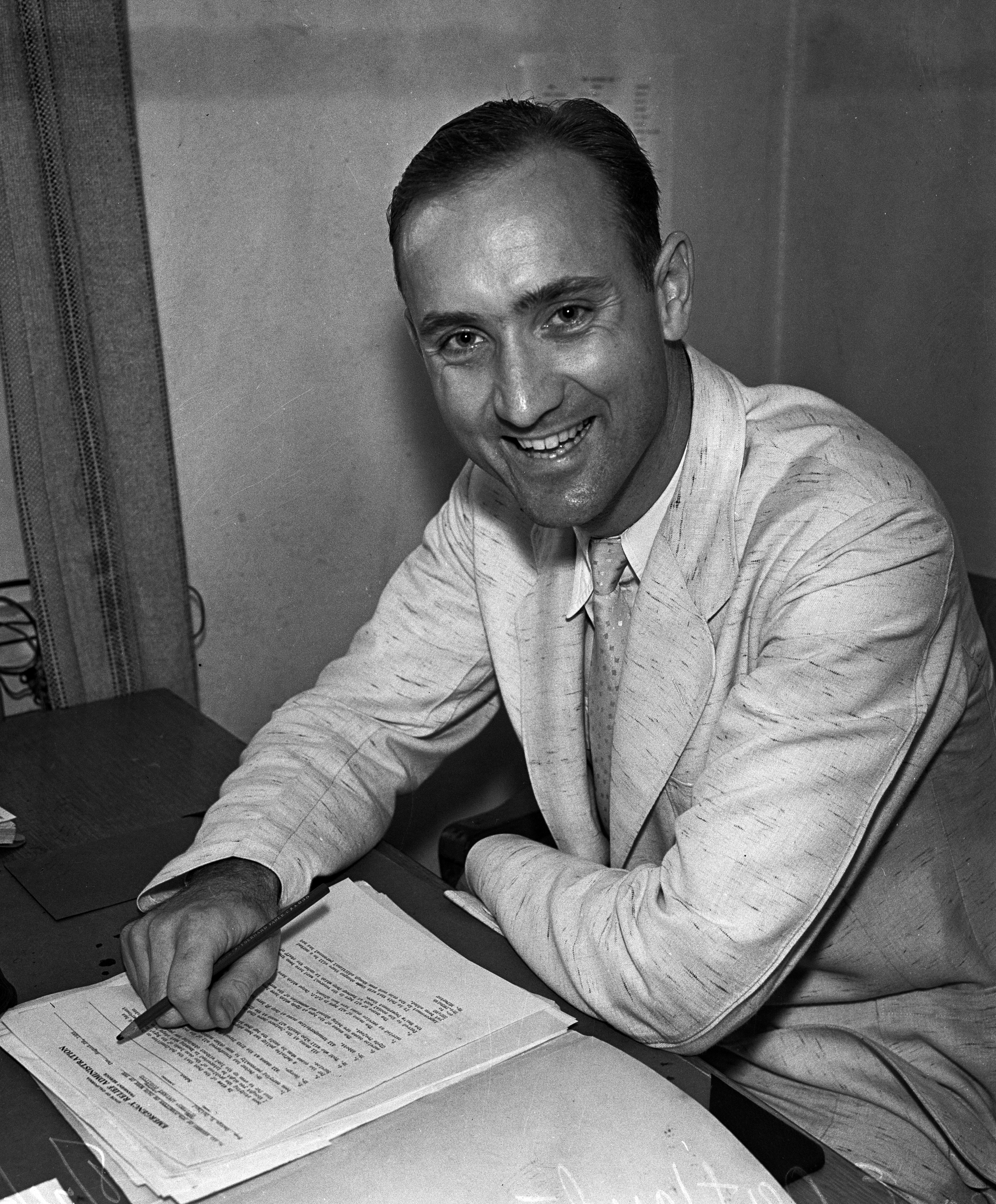
- Outland in 1935

Member of the U.S. House of Representatives from California's 11th district
- In office January 3, 1943 – January 3, 1947
- Preceded by: John Carl Hinshaw
- Succeeded by: Ernest K. Bramblett

Personal details
- Born: George Elmer Outland; October 8, 1906 Ventura County, California
- Died: March 2, 1981 (aged 74) Anacortes, Washington
- Resting place: Pierce Cemetery in Santa Paula, California
- Party: Democratic
- Profession: Politician

George Elmer Outland (October 8, 1906 – March 2, 1981) was an American educator, photographer, and politician who served two terms as a U.S. representative from California from 1943 to 1947.

== Biography ==
George Elmer Outland was born in Santa Paula, Ventura County, California, on October 8, 1906. He attended the public schools and Whittier College in California, where he received an A.B. degree in 1928. He received an M.A. from Harvard University in 1929 and a Ph.D. from Yale University in 1937. He also attended the University of Southern California in Los Angeles.

=== Early career ===
Outland served as assistant director of boys' work at Hale House in Boston, Massachusetts, from 1928 to 1930 and director of boys' work at Denison House in Boston from 1929 to 1933. He returned to Southern California to take a position as director of boys' work at Neighborhood House in Los Angeles from 1933 to 1934. Outland was supervisor of boys' welfare for the Federal Transient Service of Southern California in 1934–35, and then director of New Haven Community College in Connecticut in 1935–36. He was an instructor at Yale University from 1935 to 1937, and served on the faculty of Santa Barbara State College from 1937 to 1942. (Note: Santa Barbara State College, by state law, converted to UCSB (University of California, Santa Barbara) in 1944.)

He was also a prolific amateur photographer and one of his favorite subjects was baseball. In 2009, McFarland & Company collected several of his photos into Baseball Visions of the Roaring Twenties: a Fan's Photographs of over 400 Players and Ballparks of the Era with text by Outland's son John. (Note: ISBN 978-0786441235)

=== Political career ===
Outland was a delegate to the California State Democratic Conventions from 1942 to 1950, and was elected as a Democrat to the Seventy-eighth and Seventy-ninth Congresses (January 3, 1943–January 3, 1947). He was unsuccessful for re-election in 1946, losing to Republican Ernest K. Bramblett. Outland was a delegate to the Democratic National Conventions in 1944 and 1948, and chaired the Democratic State Policy Committee from 1948 to 1950.

In 1945, Outland was a strong supporter of then-Secretary of Commerce Henry Wallace's proposed “full employment” plan, serving as one of several co-sponsors in the House.

=== Later career and death ===
After leaving Congress, Outland was a professor at San Francisco State College (now San Francisco State University) from 1947 to 1972. He then resided in Anacortes, Washington, where he died on March 2, 1981. Outland was cremated and his ashes were interred at Pierce Cemetery in his birthplace of Santa Paula, California.

== Electoral history ==
1942 United States House of Representatives elections in California
Party	Candidate	Votes	%
Democratic	George E. Outland	31,611	50.7
Republican	A. J. Dingeman	30,781	49.3
Total votes		62,392	100.0
Turnout			
Democratic win (new seat)			

1944 United States House of Representatives elections in California
Party	Candidate	Votes	%
Democratic	George E. Outland (Incumbent)	52,218	56
Republican	A. J. Dingeman	41,005	44
Total votes		93,223	100
Turnout			
Democratic hold			

1946 United States House of Representatives elections in California
Party	Candidate	Votes	%
Republican	Ernest K. Bramblett	41,902	53.1
Democratic	George E. Outland (Incumbent)	36,996	46.9
Total votes		78,898	100.0
Turnout			
Republican gain from Democratic			

1948 United States House of Representatives elections in California
Party	Candidate	Votes	%
Republican	Ernest K. Bramblett (Incumbent)	87,143	80.8
Progressive	Cole Weston	14,582	13.5
Democratic	George E. Outland (write-in)	6,157	5.7
Total votes		107,882	100.0
Turnout			
Republican hold			

== See also ==
- California's congressional delegations

== Notes ==
U.S. House of Representatives
Preceded by John Carl Hinshaw	Member of the U.S. House of Representatives from California's 11th congressional district 1943–1947	Succeeded by Ernest K. Bramblett
