= 1930 United States House of Representatives elections in California =

United States House of Representatives elections in California, 1930
- November 4, 1930

All 11 California seats to the United States House of Representatives
	Majority party	Minority party
Party	Republican	Democratic
Last election	10	1
Seats won	10	1
Seat change	Steady	Steady
Popular vote	964,690	130,106
Percentage	88.0%	11.9%
- Republican hold Democratic hold

The United States House of Representatives elections in California, 1930 was an election for California's delegation to the United States House of Representatives, which occurred as part of the general election of the House of Representatives on November 4, 1930. California's delegation remained unchanged at 10 Republicans and 1 Democrat.

== Overview ==
United States House of Representatives elections in California, 1930
Party	Votes	Percentage	Seats
Republican	964,690	88.0%	10
Democratic	130,106	11.9%	1
Independent	1,802	0.2%	0
Totals	1,096,598	100.0%	11

== Results ==
Final results from the Clerk of the House of Representatives:

=== District 1 ===
California's 1st congressional district election, 1930
Party	Candidate	Votes	%
Democratic	Clarence F. Lea (incumbent)	66,703	100.0
Turnout			
Democratic hold			

=== District 2 ===
California's 2nd congressional district election, 1930
Party	Candidate	Votes	%
Republican	Harry Lane Englebright (incumbent)	35,941	100.0
Turnout			
Republican hold			

=== District 3 ===
California's 3rd congressional district election, 1930
Party	Candidate	Votes	%
Republican	Charles F. Curry, Jr.	43,336	53.4
Republican	J. M. Inman	26,785	33.0
Democratic	Frank H. Buck	9,172	11.3
Independent	Katherine Braddock	1,753	2.2
Independent	E. M. Turner	49	0.1
Total votes		80,095	100.0
Turnout			
Republican hold			

=== District 4 ===
California's 4th congressional district election, 1930
Party	Candidate	Votes	%
Republican	Florence Prag Kahn (incumbent)	47,397	100.0
Turnout			
Republican hold			

=== District 5 ===
California's 5th congressional district election, 1930
Party	Candidate	Votes	%
Republican	Richard J. Welch (incumbent)	59,853	100.0
Turnout			
Republican hold			

=== District 6 ===
California's 6th congressional district election, 1930
Party	Candidate	Votes	%
Republican	Albert E. Carter (incumbent)	110,190	100.0
Turnout			
Republican hold			

=== District 7 ===
California's 7th congressional district election, 1930
Party	Candidate	Votes	%
Republican	Henry E. Barbour (incumbent)	79,041	100.0
Turnout			
Republican hold			

=== District 8 ===
California's 8th congressional district election, 1930
Party	Candidate	Votes	%
Republican	Arthur M. Free (incumbent)	93,377	100.0
Turnout			
Republican hold			

=== District 9 ===
California's 9th congressional district election, 1930
Party	Candidate	Votes	%
Republican	William E. Evans (incumbent)	182,176	100.0
Turnout			
Republican hold			

=== District 10 ===
California's 10th congressional district election, 1930
Party	Candidate	Votes	%
Republican	Joe Crail (incumbent)	162,502	75
Democratic	John F. Dockweiler	54,231	25
Total votes		216,733	100
Turnout			
Democratic hold			

=== District 11 ===
California's 11th congressional district election, 1930
Party	Candidate	Votes	%
Republican	Philip D. Swing (incumbent)	124,092	100.0
Turnout			
Republican hold			

== See also ==
- 72nd United States Congress
- Political party strength in California
- Political party strength in U.S. states
- 1930 United States House of Representatives elections
