= California's 11th congressional district =

U.S. House district for California

Coordinates: 37.9°N 122.0°W

- Interactive map of district boundaries
- Representative: Nancy Pelosi; D–San Francisco
- Distribution: 100.0% urban; 0.0% rural
- Population (2025): 727,611
- Median household income: $143,227
- Ethnicity: 43.19% White; 30.60% Asian; 14.09% Hispanic; 5.55% Two or more races; 5.27% Black; 1.3% other
- Cook PVI: D+36

California's 11th congressional district is a congressional district in the U.S. state of California represented by former Speaker of the House Nancy Pelosi.

Since the 2022 elections, the 11th district is entirely in San Francisco, and includes most of the city with the exception of the southern neighborhoods of Excelsior District, Visitacion Valley, Portola, and Ocean View.

Before redistricting, the 11th district consisted of most of Contra Costa County. Mark DeSaulnier, a Democrat, represented the district from January 2015 to January 2023. Cities and CDPs in the district included Alamo, Bay Point, Blackhawk, Clayton, Concord, Diablo, El Cerrito, El Sobrante, Kensington, Lafayette, Moraga, Orinda, Pinole, Pittsburg, Pleasant Hill, San Pablo, Richmond, and Walnut Creek; most of Danville; and parts of Antioch and Martinez.

== Recent election results from statewide races ==
=== 2023–2027 boundaries ===
Year	Office	Results
2008	President	Obama 86–13%
2010	Governor	Brown 79–18%
2010	Lt. Governor	Newsom 76–16%
2010	Secretary of State	Bowen 77–14%
2010	Attorney General	Harris 71–20%
2010	Treasurer	Lockyer 79–13%
2010	Controller	Chiang 78–13%
2012	President	Obama 87–13%
2014	Governor	Brown 88–12%
2016	President	Clinton 86–9%
2018	Governor	Newsom 87–13%
2018	Attorney General	Becerra 87–13%
2020	President	Biden 86–12%
2022	Senate (Reg.)	Padilla 86–14%
2022	Governor	Newsom 86–14%
2022	Lt. Governor	Kounalakis 85–15%
2022	Secretary of State	Weber 85–15%
2022	Attorney General	Bonta 84–16%
2022	Treasurer	Ma 84–16%
2022	Controller	Cohen 77–23%
2024	President	Harris 82–14%
2024	Senate (Reg.)	Schiff 84–16%

=== 2027–2033 boundaries ===
Year	Office	Results
2008	President	Obama 86–13%
2010	Governor	Brown 79–18%
2010	Lt. Governor	Newsom 76–16%
2010	Secretary of State	Bowen 77–14%
2010	Attorney General	Harris 71–20%
2010	Treasurer	Lockyer 79–13%
2010	Controller	Chiang 78–13%
2012	President	Obama 87–13%
2014	Governor	Brown 88–12%
2016	President	Clinton 86–9%
2018	Governor	Newsom 87–13%
2018	Attorney General	Becerra 87–13%
2020	President	Biden 86–12%
2022	Senate (Reg.)	Padilla 86–14%
2022	Governor	Newsom 86–14%
2022	Lt. Governor	Kounalakis 85–15%
2022	Secretary of State	Weber 85–15%
2022	Attorney General	Bonta 84–16%
2022	Treasurer	Ma 84–16%
2022	Controller	Cohen 77–23%
2024	President	Harris 82–14%
2024	Senate (Reg.)	Schiff 84–16%

== Composition ==
FIPS County Code	County	Seat	Population
75	San Francisco	San Francisco	808,988

Due to the 2020 redistricting, California's 11th district has effectively been shifted to the former geography of the 12th district. The district encompasses the city of San Francisco almost entirely, except for the neighborhoods of Crocker-Amazon, Excelsior, Little Hollywood, Mission Terrace, Oceanview, Outer Mission, Portola, and Visitacion Valley.

=== Cities ===
- San Francisco – 808,988

== List of members representing the district ==
Member	Party	Dates	Cong ress(es)	Electoral history	Counties
District created March 4, 1913
William Kettner (San Diego)	Democratic	March 4, 1913 – March 3, 1921	63rd 64th 65th 66th	Elected in 1912. Re-elected in 1914. Re-elected in 1916. Re-elected in 1918. Retired.	Imperial, Inyo, Mono, Orange, Riverside, San Bernardino, San Diego
Phil Swing (El Centro)	Republican	March 4, 1921 – March 3, 1933	67th 68th 69th 70th 71st 72nd	Elected in 1920. Re-elected in 1922. Re-elected in 1924. Re-elected in 1926. Re-elected in 1928. Re-elected in 1930. Retired.	Imperial, Inyo, Mono, Orange, Riverside, San Bernardino, San Diego
William E. Evans (Glendale)	Republican	March 4, 1933 – January 3, 1935	73rd	Redistricted from the 9th district and re-elected in 1932. Lost re-election.	Los Angeles
John S. McGroarty (Tujunga)	Democratic	January 3, 1935 – January 3, 1939	74th 75th	Elected in 1934. Re-elected in 1936. Retired to run for Secretary of State of California.	Los Angeles
John Carl Hinshaw (Pasadena)	Republican	January 3, 1939 – January 3, 1943	76th 77th	Elected in 1938. Re-elected in 1940. Redistricted to the 20th district.	Los Angeles
George E. Outland (Santa Barbara)	Democratic	January 3, 1943 – January 3, 1947	78th 79th	Elected in 1942. Re-elected in 1944. Lost re-election.	Monterey, San Luis Obispo, Santa Barbara, Ventura
Ernest K. Bramblett (Pacific Grove)	Republican	January 3, 1947 – January 3, 1953	80th 81st 82nd	Elected in 1946. Re-elected in 1948. Re-elected in 1950. Redistricted to the 13th district.	Monterey, San Luis Obispo, Santa Barbara, Ventura
J. Leroy Johnson (Stockton)	Republican	January 3, 1953 – January 3, 1957	83rd 84th	Redistricted from the 3rd district and re-elected in 1952. Re-elected in 1954. Lost re-election.	San Joaquin, Stanislaus
John J. McFall (Manteca)	Democratic	January 3, 1957 – January 3, 1963	85th 86th 87th	Elected in 1956. Re-elected in 1958. Re-elected in 1960. Redistricted to the 15th district.	San Joaquin, Stanislaus
J. Arthur Younger (San Mateo)	Republican	January 3, 1963 – June 20, 1967	88th 89th 90th	Redistricted from the 9th district and re-elected in 1962. Re-elected in 1964. Re-elected in 1966. Died.	San Mateo
Vacant		June 20, 1967 – December 12, 1967	90th		San Mateo
Pete McCloskey (Portola Valley)	Republican	December 12, 1967 – January 3, 1973	90th 91st 92nd	Elected to finish Younger's term. Re-elected in 1968. Re-elected in 1970. Redistricted to the 17th district.	San Mateo
Leo Ryan (South San Francisco)	Democratic	January 3, 1973 – November 18, 1978	93rd 94th 95th	Elected in 1972. Re-elected in 1974. Re-elected in 1976. Re-elected in 1978 but assassinated.	1973–1983; Northern San Mateo
Vacant		November 18, 1978 – April 3, 1979	95th 96th		1973–1983; Northern San Mateo
William Royer (Redwood City)	Republican	April 3, 1979 – January 3, 1981	96th	Elected to finish Ryan's term. Lost re-election.	1973–1983; Northern San Mateo
Tom Lantos (San Mateo)	Democratic	January 3, 1981 – January 3, 1993	97th 98th 99th 100th 101st 102nd	Elected in 1980. Re-elected in 1982. Re-elected in 1984. Re-elected in 1982. Re-elected in 1988. Re-elected in 1990. Redistricted to the 12th district.	1973–1983; Northern San Mateo
Tom Lantos (San Mateo)	Democratic	January 3, 1981 – January 3, 1993	97th 98th 99th 100th 101st 102nd	Elected in 1980. Re-elected in 1982. Re-elected in 1984. Re-elected in 1982. Re-elected in 1988. Re-elected in 1990. Redistricted to the 12th district.	1983–1993 The 11th district that Lantos served from 1981 until 1993 included a small portion of San Francisco, as well as Daly City and San Mateo. Most of San Mateo
Richard Pombo (Tracy)	Republican	January 3, 1993 – January 3, 2007	103rd 104th 105th 106th 107th 108th 109th	Elected in 1992. Re-elected in 1994. Re-elected in 1996. Re-elected in 1998. Re-elected in 2000. Re-elected in 2002. Re-elected in 2004. Lost re-election.	1993–2003; Most of Sacramento and San Joaquin
Richard Pombo (Tracy)	Republican	January 3, 1993 – January 3, 2007	103rd 104th 105th 106th 107th 108th 109th	Elected in 1992. Re-elected in 1994. Re-elected in 1996. Re-elected in 1998. Re-elected in 2000. Re-elected in 2002. Re-elected in 2004. Lost re-election.	2003–2013 Eastern Alameda, southern and northeastern Contra Costa, most of San Joaquin, southern Santa Clara
Jerry McNerney (Stockton)	Democratic	January 3, 2007 – January 3, 2013	110th 111th 112th	Elected in 2006. Re-elected in 2008. Re-elected in 2010. Redistricted to the 9th district.	2003–2013 Eastern Alameda, southern and northeastern Contra Costa, most of San Joaquin, southern Santa Clara
George Miller (Martinez)	Democratic	January 3, 2013 – January 3, 2015	113th	Redistricted from the 7th district and re-elected in 2012. Retired.	2013–2023 Most of Contra Costa
Mark DeSaulnier (Concord)	Democratic	January 3, 2015 – January 3, 2023	114th 115th 116th 117th	Elected in 2014. Re-elected in 2016. Re-elected in 2018. Re-elected in 2020. Redistricted to the 10th district.	2013–2023 Most of Contra Costa
Nancy Pelosi (San Francisco)	Democratic	January 3, 2023 – present	118th 119th	Redistricted from the 12th district and re-elected in 2022. Re-elected in 2024. Retiring at the end of term.	2023–2027 Most of San Francisco
Scott Wiener (San Francisco)	Democratic	Assuming office on January 3, 2027		Elected in 2026.	

== Election results ==
=== 1912 ===
1912 United States House of Representatives elections in California
Party	Candidate	Votes	%
Democratic	William Kettner	24,822	42.7
Republican	Samuel C. Evans	21,426	36.8
Socialist	Noble A. Richardson	7,059	12.1
Prohibition	Helen M. Stoddard	4,842	8.3
Total votes		46,248	100.0
Turnout			
Democratic gain from Republican			

=== 1914 ===
1914 United States House of Representatives elections in California
Party	Candidate	Votes	%
Democratic	William Kettner (incumbent)	47,165	52.7
Republican	James Carson Needham	25,001	27.9
Prohibition	James S. Edwards	11,278	12.7
Socialist	Casper Bauer	6,033	6.7
Total votes		89,477	100.0
Turnout			
Democratic hold			

=== 1916 ===
1916 United States House of Representatives elections in California
Party	Candidate	Votes	%
Democratic	William Kettner (incumbent)	42,051	44.5
Republican	Robert C. Harbison	33,765	35.7
Prohibition	James S. Edwards	14,759	15.6
Socialist	Marcus W. Robbins	3,913	4.1
Total votes		94,488	100.0
Turnout			
Democratic hold			

=== 1918 ===
1918 United States House of Representatives elections in California
Party	Candidate	Votes	%
Democratic	William Kettner (incumbent)	45,915	72.2
Prohibition	Stella B. Irvine	17,642	27.8
Total votes		63,557	100.0
Turnout			
Democratic hold			

=== 1920 ===
1920 United States House of Representatives elections in California
Party	Candidate	Votes	%
Republican	Phil Swing	59,425	72.9
Democratic	Hugh L. Dickson	22,144	27.1
Total votes		81,569	100.0
Turnout			
Republican gain from Democratic			

=== 1922 ===
1922 United States House of Representatives elections in California
Party	Candidate	Votes	%
Republican	Phil Swing (incumbent)	79,039	91.4
Prohibition	Charles H. Randall	7,466	8.6
Total votes		86,505	100.0
Turnout			
Republican hold			

=== 1924 ===
1924 United States House of Representatives elections in California
Party	Candidate	Votes	%
Republican	Phil Swing (incumbent)	93,811	100.0
Turnout			
Republican hold			

=== 1926 ===
1926 United States House of Representatives elections in California
Party	Candidate	Votes	%
Republican	Phil Swing (incumbent)	89,726	100.0
Turnout			
Republican hold			

=== 1928 ===
1928 United States House of Representatives elections in California
Party	Candidate	Votes	%
Republican	Phil Swing (incumbent)	127,115	100.0
Turnout			
Republican hold			

=== 1930 ===
1930 United States House of Representatives elections in California
Party	Candidate	Votes	%
Republican	Phil Swing (incumbent)	124,092	100.0
Turnout			
Republican hold			

=== 1932 ===
1932 United States House of Representatives elections in California
Party	Candidate	Votes	%
Republican	William E. Evans (incumbent)	57,739	51.8
Democratic	Albert D. Hadley	38,240	34.3
Liberty	Marshall V. Hartranft	15,520	13.9
Total votes		111,499	100.0
Turnout			
Republican hold			

=== 1934 ===
1934 United States House of Representatives elections in California
Party	Candidate	Votes	%
Democratic	John S. McGroarty	66,999	53.5
Republican	William E. Evans (incumbent)	56,350	45.0
Socialist	William E. Stephenson	1,814	1.5
Total votes		125,163	100.0
Turnout			
Democratic gain from Republican			

=== 1936 ===
1936 United States House of Representatives elections in California
Party	Candidate	Votes	%
Democratic	John S. McGroarty (incumbent)	69,679	50.5
Republican	John Carl Hinshaw	54,914	39.8
Progressive Party (US, 1924)	Robert S. Funk	12,340	8.9
Communist	William Ingham	1,041	0.8
Total votes		137,974	100.0
Turnout			
Democratic hold			

=== 1938 ===
1938 United States House of Representatives elections in California
Party	Candidate	Votes	%
Republican	John Carl Hinshaw	68,712	47.0
Democratic	Carl Stuart Hamblen	59,993	41.1
Townsend	Ralph D. Horton	12,713	8.7
Progressive Party (US, 1924)	John R. Grey	3,821	2.6
Communist	Orla E. Lair	817	0.6
Total votes		146,056	100.0
Turnout			
Republican gain from Democratic			

=== 1940 ===
1940 United States House of Representatives elections in California
Party	Candidate	Votes	%
Republican	John Carl Hinshaw (incumbent)	170,504	96.6
Communist	Orla E. Lair	6,003	3.4
Total votes		176,507	100.0
Turnout			
Republican hold			

=== 1942 ===
1942 United States House of Representatives elections in California
Party	Candidate	Votes	%
Democratic	George E. Outland	31,611	50.7
Republican	A. J. Dingeman	30,781	49.3
Total votes		62,392	100.0
Turnout			
Democratic win (new seat)			

=== 1944 ===
1944 United States House of Representatives elections in California
Party	Candidate	Votes	%
Democratic	George E. Outland (incumbent)	52,218	56
Republican	A. J. Dingeman	41,005	44
Total votes		93,223	100
Turnout			
Democratic hold			

=== 1946 ===
1946 United States House of Representatives elections in California
Party	Candidate	Votes	%
Republican	Ernest K. Bramblett	41,902	53.1
Democratic	George E. Outland (incumbent)	36,996	46.9
Total votes		78,898	100.0
Turnout			
Republican gain from Democratic			

=== 1948 ===
1948 United States House of Representatives elections in California
Party	Candidate	Votes	%
Republican	Ernest K. Bramblett (incumbent)	87,143	80.8
Progressive	Cole Weston	14,582	13.5
Democratic	George E. Outland (write-in)	6,157	5.7
Total votes		107,882	100.0
Turnout			
Republican hold			

=== 1950 ===
1950 United States House of Representatives elections in California
Party	Candidate	Votes	%
Republican	Ernest K. Bramblett (incumbent)	59,780	52.1
Democratic	Ardis M. Walker	55,020	47.9
Total votes		114,800	100.0
Turnout			
Republican hold			

=== 1952 ===
1952 United States House of Representatives elections in California
Party	Candidate	Votes	%
Republican	Justin L. Johnson (incumbent)	101,052	87.1
Progressive	Leslie B. Schilingheyde	14,999	12.9
Total votes		116,051	100.0
Turnout			
Republican hold			

=== 1954 ===
1954 United States House of Representatives elections in California
Party	Candidate	Votes	%
Republican	Justin L. Johnson (incumbent)	54,716	52.6
Democratic	Carl Sugar	49,388	47.4
Total votes		104,104	100.0
Turnout			
Republican hold			

=== 1956 ===
1956 United States House of Representatives elections in California
Party	Candidate	Votes	%
Democratic	John J. McFall	70,630	53.1
Republican	Justin L. Johnson (incumbent)	62,448	46.9
Total votes		133,078	100.0
Turnout			
Democratic gain from Republican			

=== 1958 ===
1958 United States House of Representatives elections in California
Party	Candidate	Votes	%
Democratic	John J. McFall (incumbent)	86,924	69.3
Republican	Frederick S. Van Dyke	38,427	30.7
Total votes		125,351	100.0
Turnout			
Democratic hold			

=== 1960 ===
1960 United States House of Representatives elections in California
Party	Candidate	Votes	%
Democratic	John J. McFall (incumbent)	97,368	65.4
Republican	Clifford B. Bull	51,473	34.6
Total votes		148,841	100.0
Turnout			
Democratic hold			

=== 1962 ===
1962 United States House of Representatives elections in California
Party	Candidate	Votes	%
Republican	J. Arthur Younger (incumbent)	101,963	62.3
Democratic	John D. Kaster	61,623	37.7
Total votes		163,586	100.0
Turnout			
Republican hold			

=== 1964 ===
1964 United States House of Representatives elections in California
Party	Candidate	Votes	%
Republican	J. Arthur Younger (incumbent)	116,022	54.8
Democratic	W. Mark Sullivan	95,747	45.2
Total votes		211,769	100.0
Turnout			
Republican hold			

=== 1966 ===
1966 United States House of Representatives elections in California
Party	Candidate	Votes	%
Republican	J. Arthur Younger (incumbent)	113,679	59.4
Democratic	W. Mark Sullivan	77,605	40.6
Total votes		191,284	100.0
Turnout			
Republican hold			

=== 1967 (Special) ===
1967 Special election
Party	Candidate	Votes	%
Republican	Pete McCloskey	63,850	57.2
Democratic	Roy A. Archibald	43,759	39.2
Independent	Shirley Temple	3,938	3.5
Total votes		111,547	100.0
Turnout			
Republican hold			

=== 1968 ===
1968 United States House of Representatives elections in California
Party	Candidate	Votes	%
Republican	Pete McCloskey (incumbent)	165,482	79.3
Democratic	Urban G. Whitaker Jr.	40,979	19.6
Peace and Freedom	David Demorest Ransom	2,157	1.0
Total votes		208,618	100.0
Turnout			
Republican hold			

=== 1970 ===
1970 United States House of Representatives elections in California
Party	Candidate	Votes	%
Republican	Pete McCloskey (incumbent)	144,500	77.5
Democratic	Robert E. Gomperts	39,188	21.0
Independent	Scattering	2,786	1.5
Total votes		186,474	100.0
Turnout			
Republican hold			

=== 1972 ===
1972 United States House of Representatives elections in California
Party	Candidate	Votes	%
Democratic	Leo Ryan	113,580	60.4
Republican	Charles E. Chase	69,655	37.0
American Independent	Nicholas Waeil Kudrovzeff	4,852	2.6
Total votes		188,087	100.0
Turnout			
Democratic win (new seat)			

=== 1974 ===
1974 United States House of Representatives elections in California
Party	Candidate	Votes	%
Democratic	Leo Ryan (incumbent)	106,075	75.8
Republican	Bob Jones	29,783	21.3
American Independent	Nicholas Waeil Kudrovzeff	4,293	2.9
Total votes		140,151	100.0
Turnout			
Democratic hold			

=== 1976 ===
1976 United States House of Representatives elections in California
Party	Candidate	Votes	%
Democratic	Leo Ryan (incumbent)	107,618	61.1
Republican	Bob Jones	62,435	35.4
American Independent	Nicholas Waeil Kudrovzeff	6,141	3.5
Total votes		176,194	100.0
Turnout			
Democratic hold			

=== 1978 ===
1978 United States House of Representatives elections in California
Party	Candidate	Votes	%
Democratic	Leo Ryan (incumbent)	92,882	60.5
Republican	Dave Welch	54,621	35.6
American Independent	Nicholas Waeil Kudrovzeff	5,961	3.9
Total votes		153,464	100.0
Turnout			
Democratic hold			

=== 1979 (Special) ===
1979 Special election
Party	Candidate	Votes	%
Republican	William Royer	52,585	57.3
Democratic	G.W. "Joe" Holsinger	37,685	41.1
American Independent	Nicholas W. Kudrovzeff	770	0.8
Peace and Freedom	Wilson G. Branch	731	0.8
Total votes		91,771	100.0
Turnout			
Republican gain from Democratic			

=== 1980 ===
1980 United States House of Representatives elections in California
Party	Candidate	Votes	%
Democratic	Tom Lantos	85,823	46.4
Republican	William Royer (incumbent)	80,100	43.3
Peace and Freedom	Wilson G. Branch	13,723	7.4
Libertarian	William S. Wade Jr.	3,816	2.1
American Independent	Nicholas W. Kudrovzeff	1,550	0.8
Total votes		185,012	100.0
Turnout			
Democratic gain from Republican			

=== 1982 ===
1982 United States House of Representatives elections in California
Party	Candidate	Votes	%
Democratic	Tom Lantos (incumbent)	109,812	57.1
Republican	William Royer	76,462	39.7
Libertarian	Chuck Olson	2,920	1.5
Peace and Freedom	Wilson G. Branch	1,928	1.0
American Independent	Nicholas W. Kudrovzeff	1,250	0.6
Total votes		192,372	100.0
Turnout			
Democratic hold			

=== 1984 ===
1984 United States House of Representatives elections in California
Party	Candidate	Votes	%
Democratic	Tom Lantos (incumbent)	147,607	69.9
Republican	John J. "Jack" Hickey	59,625	28.2
American Independent	Nicholas W. Kudrovzeff	3,883	1.8
Total votes		211,115	100.0
Turnout			
Democratic hold			

=== 1986 ===
1986 United States House of Representatives elections in California
Party	Candidate	Votes	%
Democratic	Tom Lantos (incumbent)	112,380	74.1
Republican	Bill Quarishi	39,315	25.9
Total votes		151,695	100.0
Turnout			
Democratic hold			

=== 1988 ===
1988 United States House of Representatives elections in California
Party	Candidate	Votes	%
Democratic	Tom Lantos (incumbent)	145,484	71.0
Republican	Bill Quarishi	50,050	24.4
Libertarian	Bill Wade	4,683	2.3
Peace and Freedom	Victor Martinez	2,906	1.4
American Independent	Nicholas W. Kudrovzeff	1,893	0.9
Total votes		205,016	100.0
Turnout			
Democratic hold			

=== 1990 ===
1990 United States House of Representatives elections in California
Party	Candidate	Votes	%
Democratic	Tom Lantos (incumbent)	105,029	65.9
Republican	Bill Quarishi	45,818	28.8
Libertarian	June R. Genis	8,518	5.3
Total votes		159,365	100.0
Turnout			
Democratic hold			

=== 1992 ===
1992 United States House of Representatives elections in California
Party	Candidate	Votes	%
Republican	Richard Pombo	94,453	47.6
Democratic	Patti Garamendi	90,539	45.6
Libertarian	Christine Roberts	13,498	6.8
Total votes		198,490	100.0
Turnout			
Republican win (new seat)			

=== 1994 ===
1994 United States House of Representatives elections in California
Party	Candidate	Votes	%
Republican	Richard Pombo (incumbent)	99,302	62.14
Democratic	Randy A. Perry	55,794	34.91
Libertarian	Joseph B. Miller	4,718	2.95
Total votes		159,814	100.0
Turnout			
Republican hold			

=== 1996 ===
1996 United States House of Representatives elections in California
Party	Candidate	Votes	%
Republican	Richard Pombo (incumbent)	107,477	59.4
Democratic	Jason Silva	65,536	36.2
Libertarian	Kelly Rego	5,077	2.8
Natural Law	Selene Bush	3,006	1.6
Total votes		181,096	100.0
Turnout			
Republican hold			

=== 1998 ===
1998 United States House of Representatives elections in California
Party	Candidate	Votes	%
Republican	Richard Pombo (incumbent)	95,496	61.43
Democratic	Robert L. Figueroa	56,345	36.25
Libertarian	Jesse Baird	3,608	2.32
Total votes		155,449	100.0
Turnout			
Republican hold			

=== 2000 ===
2000 United States House of Representatives elections in California
Party	Candidate	Votes	%
Republican	Richard Pombo (incumbent)	120,635	57.9
Democratic	Tom Y. Santos	79,539	38.1
Libertarian	Kathryn A. Russow	5,036	2.4
Natural Law	Jon A. Kurey	3,397	1.6
Total votes		208,607	100.0
Turnout			
Republican hold			

=== 2002 ===
2002 United States House of Representatives elections in California
Party	Candidate	Votes	%
Republican	Richard Pombo (incumbent)	104,921	60.4
Democratic	Elaine Shaw	69,035	39.6
Total votes		173,956	100.0
Turnout			
Republican hold			

=== 2004 ===
2004 United States House of Representatives elections in California
Party	Candidate	Votes	%
Republican	Richard Pombo (incumbent)	163,582	61.3
Democratic	Jerry McNerney	103,587	38.7
Total votes		267,169	100.0
Turnout			
Republican hold			

=== 2006 ===
2006 United States House of Representatives elections in California
Party	Candidate	Votes	%
Democratic	Jerry McNerney	109,868	53.3
Republican	Richard Pombo (incumbent)	96,396	46.7
Total votes		206,264	100.0
Turnout			
Democratic gain from Republican			

=== 2008 ===
2008 United States House of Representatives elections in California
Party	Candidate	Votes	%
Democratic	Jerry McNerney (incumbent)	164,500	55.3
Republican	Dean Andal	133,104	44.7
Total votes		297,616	100.0
Turnout			
Democratic hold			

=== 2010 ===
2010 United States House of Representatives elections in California
Party	Candidate	Votes	%
Democratic	Jerry McNerney (incumbent)	115,361	47.97
Republican	David Harmer	112,703	46.86
American Independent	David Christensen	12,439	5.17
Total votes		240,503	100.00
Democratic hold			

=== 2012 ===
2012 United States House of Representatives elections in California
Party	Candidate	Votes	%
Democratic	George Miller (incumbent)	200,743	69.7
Republican	Virginia Fuller	87,136	30.3
Total votes		287,879	100.0
Democratic hold			

=== 2014 ===
2014 United States House of Representatives elections in California
Party	Candidate	Votes	%
Democratic	Mark DeSaulnier	117,502	67%
Republican	Tue Phan	57,160	33%
Total votes		174,662	100.0%
Democratic hold			

=== 2016 ===
2016 United States House of Representatives elections in California
Party	Candidate	Votes	%
Democratic	Mark DeSaulnier (incumbent)	214,868	72%
Republican	Roger A. Petersen	83,341	28%
Total votes		298,209	100.0%
Democratic hold			

=== 2018 ===
2018 United States House of Representatives elections in California
Party	Candidate	Votes	%
Democratic	Mark DeSaulnier (incumbent)	204,369	74%
Republican	John Fitzgerald	71,312	25%
Total votes		275,681	100.0%
Democratic hold			

=== 2020 ===
2020 United States House of Representatives elections in California
Party	Candidate	Votes	%
Democratic	Mark DeSaulnier (incumbent)	271,063	73.0
Republican	Nisha Sharma	100,293	27.0
Total votes		371,356	100.0
Democratic hold			

=== 2022 ===
2022 United States House of Representatives elections in California
Party	Candidate	Votes	%
Democratic	Nancy Pelosi (incumbent)	220,848	84.0
Republican	John Dennis	42,217	16.0
Total votes		263,065	100.0
Democratic hold			

=== 2024 ===
2024 United States House of Representatives elections in California
Party	Candidate	Votes	%
Democratic	Nancy Pelosi (incumbent)	274,796	81.0
Republican	Bruce Lou	64,315	19.0
Total votes		339,111	100.0
Democratic hold			

=== 2026 ===
2026 United States House of Representatives elections in California
Party	Candidate	Votes	%
Democratic	Scott Wiener	119,475	54.6
Democratic	Connie Chan	99,460	45.4
Total votes		218,935	100.0
Democratic hold			

== See also ==
- List of United States congressional districts
- California's congressional districts
