= Carl Hinshaw =

American politician

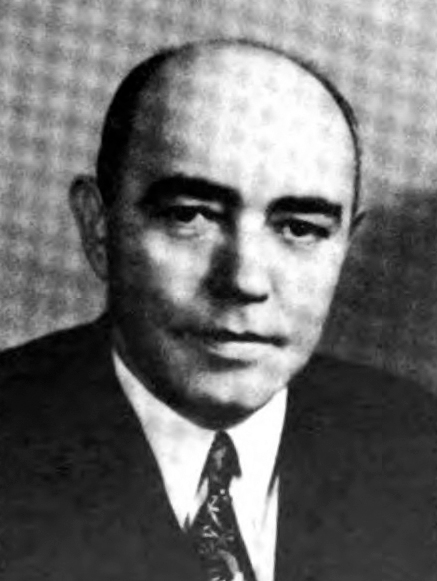

Member of the U.S. House of Representatives from California
- In office January 3, 1939 – August 5, 1956
- Preceded by: John S. McGroarty
- Succeeded by: H. Allen Smith
- Constituency: 11th district (1939–1943); 20th district (1943–1956)

Personal details
- Born: John Carl Williams Hinshaw; July 28, 1894 Chicago, Illinois, U.S.
- Died: August 5, 1956 (aged 62) Bethesda, Maryland, U.S.
- Resting place: Rock Creek Cemetery; Washington, D.C., U.S.
- Party: Republican
- Education: Princeton University (BA); University of Michigan

John Carl Williams Hinshaw (July 28, 1894 – August 5, 1956) was an American businessman and politician who served nine terms as a United States representative from California from 1939 to 1956.

== Biography ==
He was born in Chicago, Illinois, in 1894, the son of William Wade and Anna Williams Hinshaw. He attended the public schools and Valparaiso University. He graduated from Princeton University in 1916 and pursued a postgraduate course in business administration at the University of Michigan at Ann Arbor.

=== World War I ===
He served overseas as a First Lieutenant in the Sixteenth Railroad Engineers from May 1917 to September 1919 during and immediately after World War I. He was then discharged as a captain in the Corps of Engineers.

=== Business career ===
He served as laborer, salesman, and manager in automotive manufacturing in Chicago from 1920 to 1926. He also engaged in investment banking in 1927 and 1928.

Hinshaw moved to Pasadena, California in 1929 and engaged in the real estate and insurance business. He was an unsuccessful candidate for election in 1936 to the Seventy-fifth Congress.

=== Congress ===
He was elected as a Republican to the Seventy-sixth and to the eight succeeding Congresses and served from January 3, 1939, until his death in Bethesda, Maryland in 1956. He had been renominated in the June 1956 primary election, and was replaced on the general election ballot by H. Allen Smith, who won the full term.

He was a member of the Committee on Interstate and Foreign Commerce, the Joint Atomic Energy Committee, and the Congressional Air Policy Board (Vice-chairman, 1947). He received the Air Force Association's Citation of Honor in 1948, and in 1953 Hinshaw received the National Aeronautic Association's Wright Brothers Memorial Trophy "For his service as a Member of the House of Representatives in fostering the sound and consistent growth of aviation in all its forms, so that it might become a deterrent to war and that it might increasingly become an important carrier of the people and the commerce of the world." Hinshaw supported the GI Bill.

== Death and burial ==
He died in Washington, D.C. on August 5, 1956, at the age of 62. He was buried in Rock Creek Cemetery.

== Electoral history ==
Carl Hinshaw electoral history

1938 United States House of Representatives elections in California
Party	Candidate	Votes	%
Republican	John Carl Hinshaw	68,712	47.0
Democratic	Carl Stuart Hamblen	59,993	41.1
Townsend	Ralph D. Horton	12,713	8.7
Progressive Party (US, 1924)	John R. Grey	3,821	2.6
Communist	Orla E. Lair	817	0.6
Total votes		146,056	100.0
Turnout			
Republican gain from Democratic			

1940 United States House of Representatives elections in California
Party	Candidate	Votes	%
Republican	John Carl Hinshaw (Incumbent)	170,504	96.6
Communist	Orla E. Lair	6,003	3.4
Total votes		176,507	100.0
Turnout			
Republican hold			

1942 United States House of Representatives elections in California, 20th district
Party	Candidate	Votes	%
Republican	John Carl Hinshaw	62,628	48.4
Democratic	Joseph O. Donovan	55,479	42.9
Prohibition	Virgil G. Hinshaw	6,864	5.3
Townsend	Janie Bele McCarty	3,537	2.7
Communist	Orla E. Lair	792	0.6
Total votes		129,300	100.0
Republican gain from Democratic			

1944 United States House of Representatives elections in California, 20th district
Party	Candidate	Votes	%
Republican	John Carl Hinshaw (Incumbent)	112,663	51.8
Democratic	Archibald B. Young	101,090	46.5
Prohibition	Charles Hiram Randall	3,615	1.5
Total votes		217,368	100.0
Republican hold			

1946 United States House of Representatives elections in California, 20th district
Party	Candidate	Votes	%
Republican	John Carl Hinshaw (Incumbent)	98,283	63.2
Democratic	Everett G. Burkhalter	67,317	36.8
Total votes		165,600	100.0
Republican hold			

1948 United States House of Representatives elections in California, 20th district
Party	Candidate	Votes	%
Republican	John Carl Hinshaw (Incumbent)	204,710	81.6
Democratic	William B. Esterman	46,232	18.4
Total votes		250,942	100.0
Republican hold			

1950 United States House of Representatives elections in California, 20th district
Party	Candidate	Votes	%
Republican	John Carl Hinshaw (Incumbent)	211,012	85.1
Progressive	Myra Tanner Weiss	26,508	10.7
Prohibition	Frank Nelson	10,339	4.2
Total votes		247,859	100.0
Republican hold			

1952 United States House of Representatives elections in California, 20th district
Party	Candidate	Votes	%
Republican	John Carl Hinshaw (Incumbent)	109,509	100.0
Republican hold			

1954 United States House of Representatives elections in California, 20th district
Party	Candidate	Votes	%
Republican	John Carl Hinshaw (Incumbent)	71,213	71.2
Democratic	Eugene Radding	28,838	28.8
Total votes		100,051	100.0
Republican hold			

== See also ==
- List of members of the United States Congress who died in office (1950–1999)

== Sources ==
- United States Congress. "Carl Hinshaw (id: H000640)". Biographical Directory of the United States Congress.
- "Carl Hinshaw, Late a Representative from California," Memorial Services, Eighty-Fifth Congress, First Session (United States Government Printing Office, Washington, 1957)

U.S. House of Representatives
Preceded by John S. McGroarty	Member of the U.S. House of Representatives from California's 11th congressional district 1939–1943	Succeeded by George E. Outland
Preceded by Edouard V. M. Izac	Member of the U.S. House of Representatives from California's 20th congressional district 1943–1956	Succeeded by H. Allen Smith
