= Norris Poulson =

American politician (1895–1982)

Charles Norris Poulson
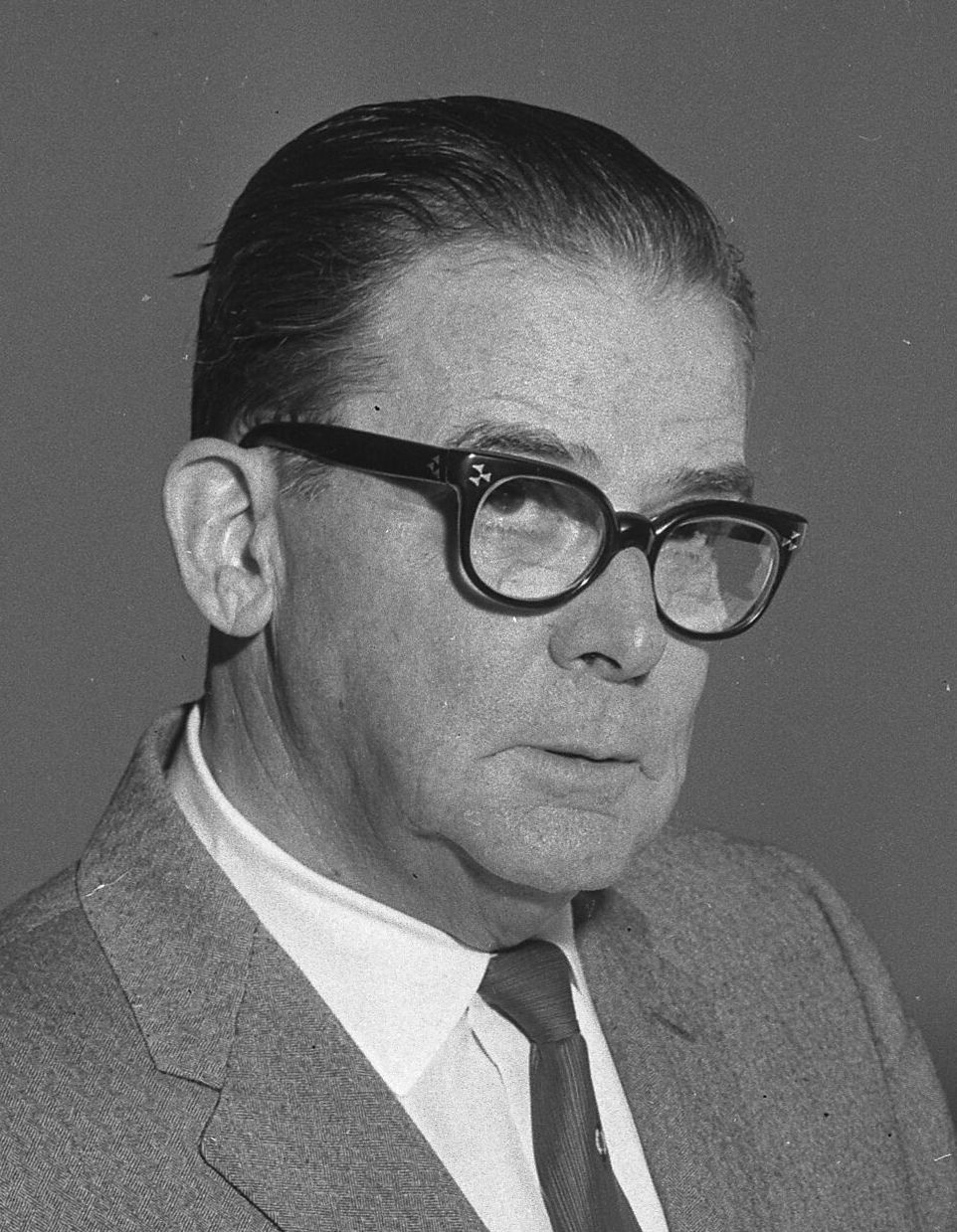
- Poulson in 1959

36th Mayor of Los Angeles
- In office July 1, 1953 – July 1, 1961
- Preceded by: Fletcher Bowron
- Succeeded by: Sam Yorty

15th President of the United States Conference of Mayors
- In office 1958–1959
- Preceded by: Robert F. Wagner Jr.
- Succeeded by: Richard J. Daley

Member of the U.S. House of Representatives from California
- In office January 3, 1947 – June 11, 1953
- Preceded by: Ned R. Healy
- Succeeded by: Glenard P. Lipscomb
- Constituency: 13th district (1947–53); 24th district (1953)
- In office January 3, 1943 – January 3, 1945
- Preceded by: Charles Kramer
- Succeeded by: Ned R. Healy
- Constituency: 13th district

Member of the California State Assembly from the 56th district
- In office January 2, 1939 – January 3, 1943
- Preceded by: Thomas Cunningham
- Succeeded by: Ernest E. Debs

Personal details
- Born: Charles Norris Poulson; July 23, 1895 Baker County, Oregon, U.S.
- Died: September 25, 1982 (aged 87) Orange, California, U.S.
- Party: Republican
- Spouse: Erna J. Loennig (m. 1916; died 1981)
- Children: 3

Charles Norris Poulson (July 23, 1895 – September 25, 1982) was an American politician who represented Southern California in public office at the local, state, and federal levels. He served as the 36th mayor of Los Angeles from 1953 to 1961, after having been a California State assemblyman and then a member of the United States Congress. He was a Republican.

== Early life and career ==
Charles Norris Poulson was born in Baker County, Oregon. He was the son of Peter Skovo Poulson (1843–1928), an immigrant from Denmark. Poulson attended Oregon State University for two years before he wed Erna June Loennig on December 25, 1916. The couple arrived in Los Angeles in 1923. Poulson became a certified public accountant through correspondence classes and night school at Southwestern Law School, which at that time had a business school.

== Political career ==
=== California State Assembly and U.S. Congress ===
In 1938, he was elected to the District 56 seat of the California State Assembly. He won a congressional seat four years later. After losing the seat in the 1944 election, he returned to the United States Congress following the 1946 elections, remaining there until his election as mayor of Los Angeles. During his years as a congressman, Poulson helped lead California in its fight against Arizona over Colorado River water. At the time of his departure from Congress, he was the chairman of the Committee on Interior and Insular Affairs.

=== Mayor of Los Angeles ===
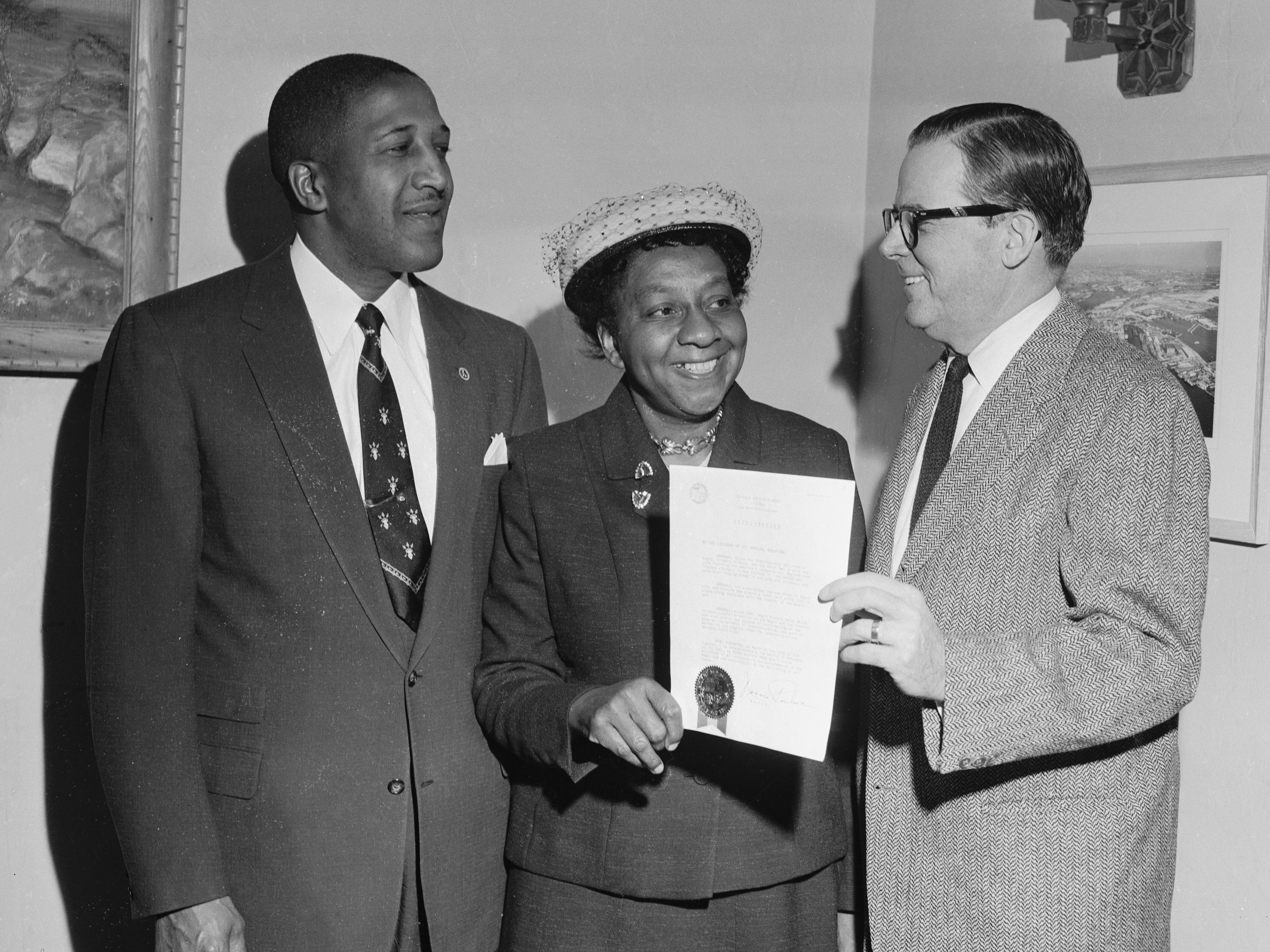
Poulson proclaiming Negro History Week with Vassie D. Wright in 1956.

Poulson's victory in the Los Angeles mayoral race came after a contentious battle in which his opponent, incumbent mayor Fletcher Bowron, claimed that the Los Angeles Times wanted to control city government and, by endorsing Poulson, would have a puppet in the mayor's office. Poulson, for his part, challenged Bowron's support for public housing, in particular a project in the area known as Chavez Ravine in Elysian Park Heights (the site on which Dodger Stadium would later be built). With the support of the group Citizens Against Socialist Housing (CASH) and drawing on the anti-communist atmosphere of the time, Poulson promised to end support for such "un-American" housing projects and to fire city employees who were communists or who refused to answer questions about their political activities.

During his eight years as mayor, Los Angeles became the third largest city in the United States, with Poulson instrumental in leading the construction of Los Angeles International Airport and expanding the Los Angeles Harbor. Most notably, he led the drive to lure baseball's Brooklyn Dodgers to Los Angeles. This led to what became known as the Battle of Chavez Ravine, which resulted in the removal of Hispanic residents from land on which Dodger Stadium was later constructed. He helped integrate the city's fire and police departments and initiated a garbage recycling program that proved to be a factor in his defeat in 1961.

In 1958 and 1959, Paulson served as president of the United States Conference of Mayors.

Perhaps the most memorable image of his mayoral career came on September 21, 1959, when he addressed Soviet premier Nikita Khrushchev during a public ceremony. The comments came after Khrushchev had constantly touted Soviet superiority during his tour of the city by Poulson. Citing Khrushchev's phrase, "We will bury you," Poulson responded, "You shall not bury us and we shall not bury you. We tell you in the friendliest terms possible we are planning no funerals, yours or our own." Poulson received over 3,600 letters following the incident, many of them praising him for his comments.

He lost a reelection campaign in 1961 to Sam Yorty, partly due to having to explain the expenses incurred by the Dodgers' franchise shift. Efforts to blunt such criticism were limited due to a severe case of laryngitis, which prevented him from responding to the invitation from local television personality George Putnam to debate Yorty on his show. Poulson did not recover from the laryngitis in time, and his campaign never recovered from the setback.

=== Later career and death ===
Following the defeat, Poulson briefly returned to accounting before retiring to La Jolla in San Diego in 1962. He died at a hospital in Orange, California, in 1982, after a colostomy operation.

His grandson Norris Brandt is a nationally recognized expert on water policy.

== Electoral history ==
1946 United States House of Representatives elections in California
Party	Candidate	Votes	%
Republican	Norris Poulson	48,071	51.8
Democratic	Ned R. Healy (Incumbent)	44,712	48.2
Total votes		92,783	100.0
Turnout			
Republican gain from Democratic			

1948 United States House of Representatives elections in California
Party	Candidate	Votes	%
Republican	Norris Poulson (Incumbent)	62,951	52.6
Democratic	Ned R. Healy	56,624	47.4
Total votes		119,575	100.0
Turnout			
Republican hold			

1950 United States House of Representatives elections in California
Party	Candidate	Votes	%
Republican	Norris Poulson (Incumbent)	83,296	84.9
Progressive	Ellen P. Davidson	14,789	15.1
Total votes		98,085	100.0
Turnout			
Republican hold			

1952 United States House of Representatives elections in California, District 24
Party	Candidate	Votes	%
Republican	Norris Poulson (incumbent)	119,799	87.4
Progressive	Bertram L. Sharp	17,307	12.6
Total votes		137,106	100.0
Turnout			
Republican hold			

=== Primary election ===
Los Angeles mayoral primary election, April 7, 1953
Candidate	Votes	%
Norris Poulson	212,668	44.06
Fletcher Bowron (incumbent)	179,205	37.13
Lloyd Aldrich	70,823	14.67
Paul Burke	16,455	3.41
Myra Tanner Weiss	3,541	0.73
Total votes	482,692	100.00

=== General election ===
Los Angeles mayoral general election, May 26, 1953
Candidate	Votes	%
Norris Poulson	287,619	53.23
Fletcher Bowron (incumbent)	252,721	46.77
Total votes	540,340	100.00

Los Angeles mayoral general election, April 2, 1957
Candidate	Votes	%
Norris Poulson (incumbent)	311,970	60.80
Robert Yeakel	141,306	27.54
John M. Ennis	44,112	8.60
William Carpenter	8,609	1.68
Errol Banks	7,094	1.38
Total votes	513,091	100.00

=== Primary election ===
Los Angeles mayoral primary election, April 4, 1961
Candidate	Votes	%
Norris Poulson (incumbent)	179,273	39.67
Sam Yorty	122,478	27.10
Patrick D. McGee	115,635	25.59
Robert C. Ronstadt	11,340	2.51
Howard M. Kessler	7,558	1.67
William Carpenter	7,267	1.61
M. Garet Miller	4,640	1.03
Oscar G. Coover	2,141	0.47
Wallace J. Lauria	1,598	0.35
Total votes	451,930	100.00

=== General election ===
Los Angeles mayoral general election, May 31, 1961
Candidate	Votes	%
Sam Yorty	275,249	51.45
Norris Poulson (incumbent)	259,760	48.55
Total votes	535,009	100.00

== See also ==
- George P. Cronk, Poulson's campaign manager in 1953

U.S. House of Representatives
Preceded by Charles Kramer	Member of the U.S. House of Representatives from California's 13th congressional district 1943–1945	Succeeded by Ned R. Healy
Preceded by Ned R. Healy	Member of the U.S. House of Representatives from California's 13th congressional district 1947–1953	Succeeded by Ernest K. Bramblett
Preceded by None	Member of the U.S. House of Representatives from California's 24th congressional district 1953	Succeeded by Glenard P. Lipscomb
