= J. Leroy Johnson =

American politician (1888–1961)

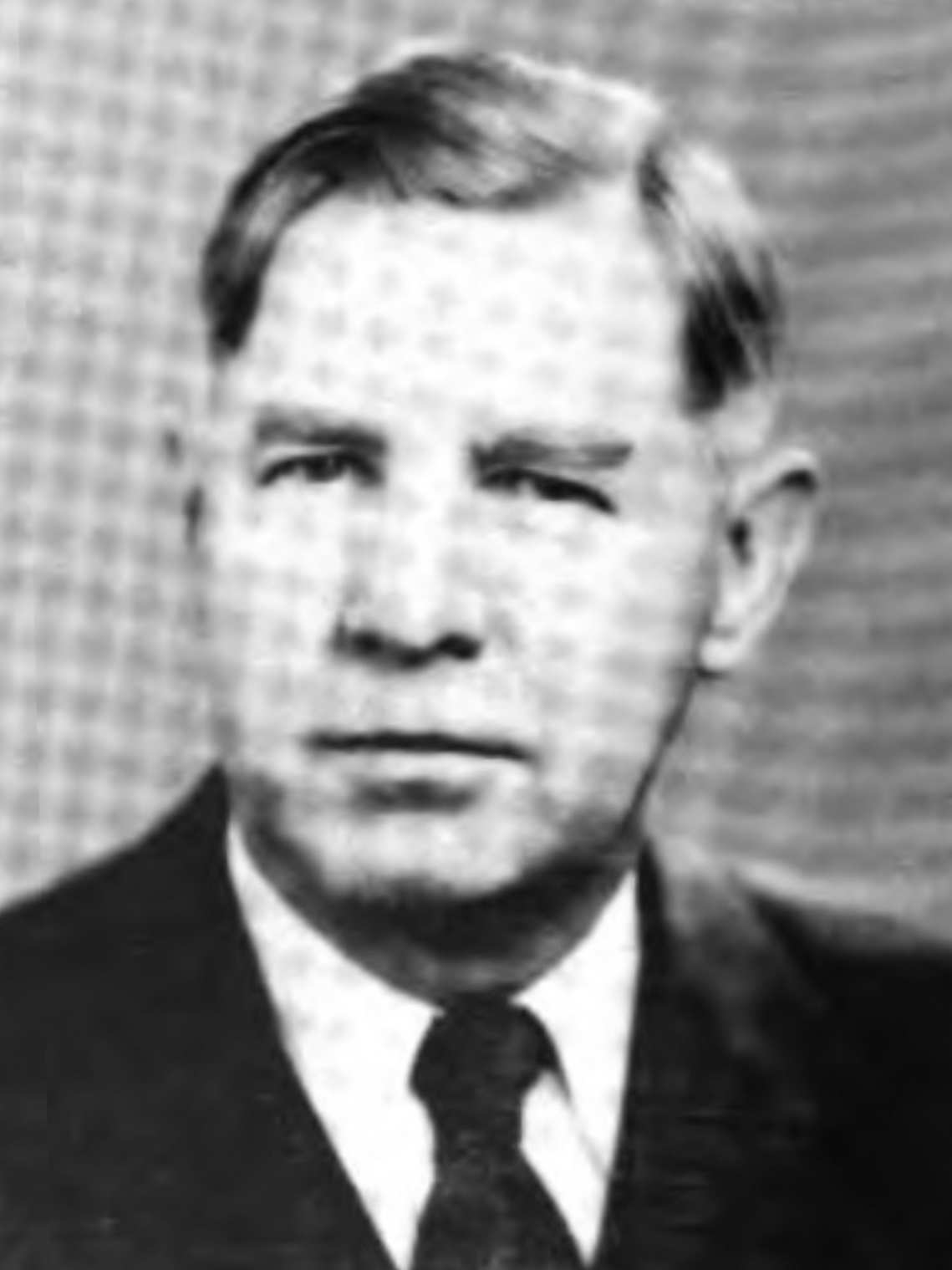

Member of the U.S. House of Representatives from California
- In office January 3, 1943 – January 3, 1957
- Preceded by: Frank H. Buck
- Succeeded by: John J. McFall
- Constituency: 3rd district (1949–1953); 11th district (1953–1957)

Personal details
- Born: Justin Leroy Johnson; April 8, 1888 Wausau, Wisconsin, U.S.
- Died: March 26, 1961 (aged 72) Stockton, California, U.S.
- Resting place: Casa Bonita Mausoleum; Stockton, California
- Party: Republican
- Education: University of Wisconsin–Madison; University of California, Berkeley
- Profession: Politician

Justin Leroy Johnson (April 8, 1888 – March 26, 1961) was an American lawyer, World War I veteran, and politician who served seven consecutive terms as a Republican United States Congressman from California from 1943 to 1957.

== Biography ==
Born in Wausau, Wisconsin, in 1888, Johnson graduated from the local high school and from the University of Wisconsin–Madison, later serving in World War I. After graduating from the University of California, Berkeley law school, he practiced law and served as city attorney in Stockton, California.

=== Congress ===
In 1942, he successfully ran for a seat in the U.S. House of Representatives, where he would serve seven consecutive terms from 1943 to 1957. In 1956, he was defeated for re-election by John J. McFall.

== Death and burial ==
He died in Stockton in 1961 and his ashes were interred in Casa Bonita Mausoleum, outside the Stockton Rural Cemetery.

== Electoral history ==
1942 United States House of Representatives elections
Party	Candidate	Votes	%
Republican	J. Leroy Johnson (Incumbent)	63,982	54.5
Democratic	Joseph B. O'Neil	53,521	45.5
Total votes		117,503	100.0
Republican hold			

1944 United States House of Representatives elections
Party	Candidate	Votes	%
Republican	J. Leroy Johnson (Incumbent)	131,705	100.0
Republican hold			

1946 United States House of Representatives elections
Party	Candidate	Votes	%
Republican	J. Leroy Johnson (Incumbent)	116,792	100.0
Republican hold			

1948 United States House of Representatives elections
Party	Candidate	Votes	%
Republican	J. Leroy Johnson (Incumbent)	166,571	84.4
Progressive	James B. "Bert" Willard	30,878	15.6
Total votes		197,449	100.0
Republican hold			

1950 United States House of Representatives elections
Party	Candidate	Votes	%
Republican	J. Leroy Johnson (Incumbent)	177,269	100.0
Republican hold			

1952 United States House of Representatives elections in California
Party	Candidate	Votes	%
Republican	J. Leroy Johnson (Incumbent)	101,052	87.1
Progressive	Leslie B. Schilingheyde	14,999	12.9
Total votes		116,051	100.0
Turnout			
Republican hold			

1954 United States House of Representatives elections in California
Party	Candidate	Votes	%
Republican	J. Leroy Johnson (Incumbent)	54,716	52.6
Democratic	Carl Sugar	49,388	47.4
Total votes		104,104	100.0
Turnout			
Republican hold			

1956 United States House of Representatives elections in California
Party	Candidate	Votes	%
Democratic	John J. McFall	70,630	53.1
Republican	J. Leroy Johnson (Incumbent)	62,448	46.9
Total votes		133,078	100.0
Turnout			
Democratic gain from Republican			

== See also ==
- California's congressional delegations

== Notes ==
U.S. House of Representatives
Preceded by Frank H. Buck	Member of the U.S. House of Representatives from California's 3rd congressional district 1943–1953	Succeeded by John E. Moss
Preceded by Ernest K. Bramblett	Member of the U.S. House of Representatives from California's 11th congressional district 1953–1957	Succeeded by John J. McFall
