= Lewis Lapham =

Lewis Lapham may refer to:

- Lewis A. Lapham (1909–1995), American shipping and banking executive
- Lewis H. Lapham (1935–2024), American writer, son of Lewis A. Lapham
- Lewis Henry Lapham (1858–1934), American entrepreneur, grandfather of Lewis A. Lapham and great-grandfather of Lewis H. Lapham
