= Margaret Morgan =

Margaret Morgan may refer to:

- Margaret Morgan (slave), black woman claimed as a slave, in a case that led to the Supreme Court of the United States trial of Prigg v. Pennsylvania
- Margaret Mary Morgan (1866-1946), American suffragist, politician and child welfare advocate
