= 1943 San Francisco mayoral election =

- November 2, 1943
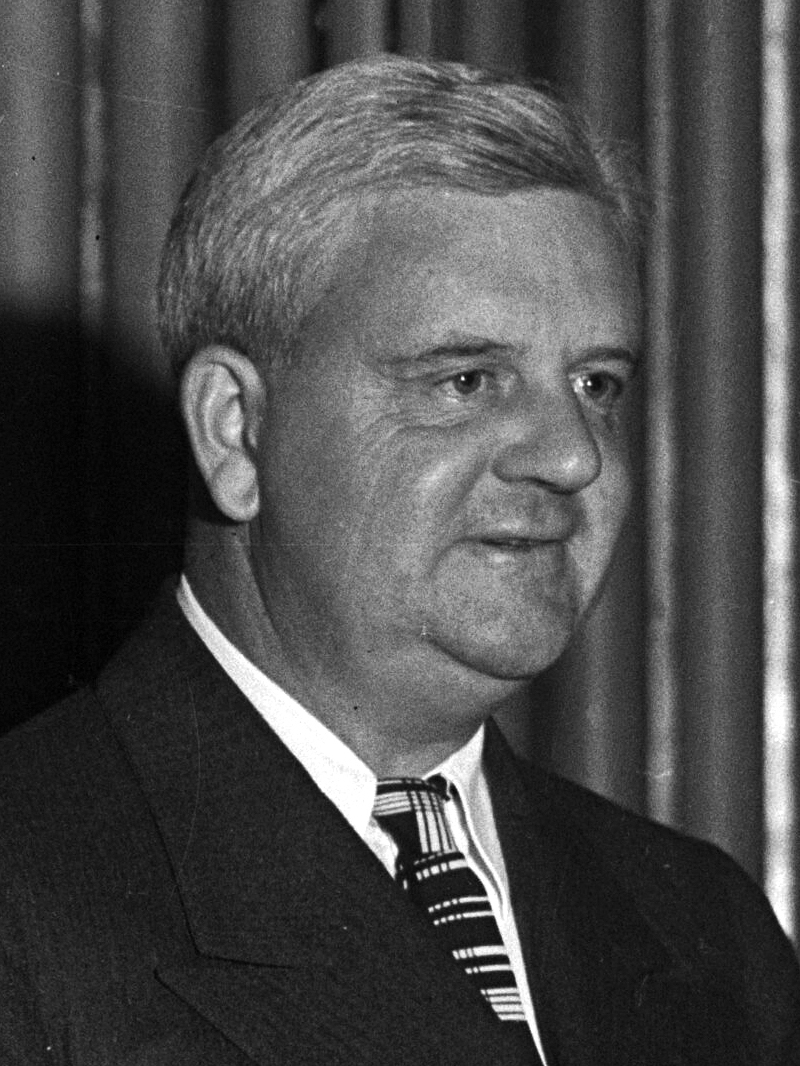

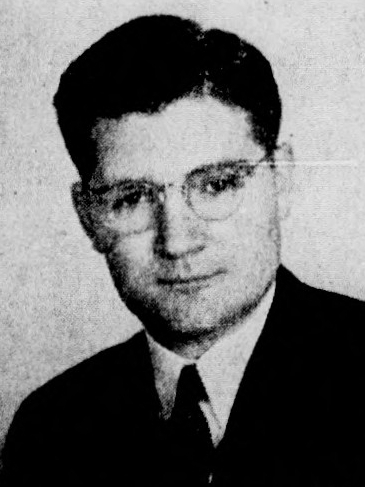

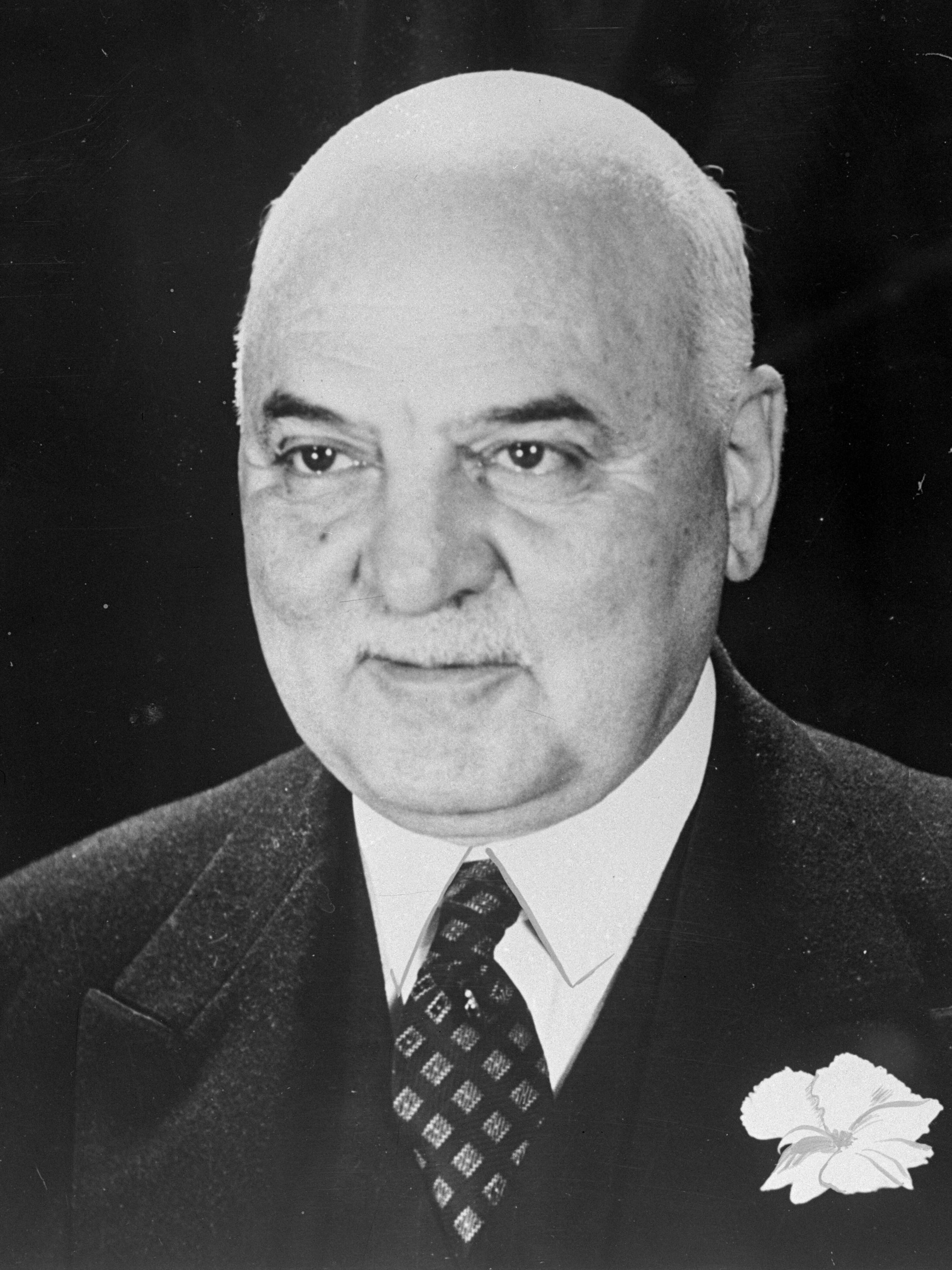

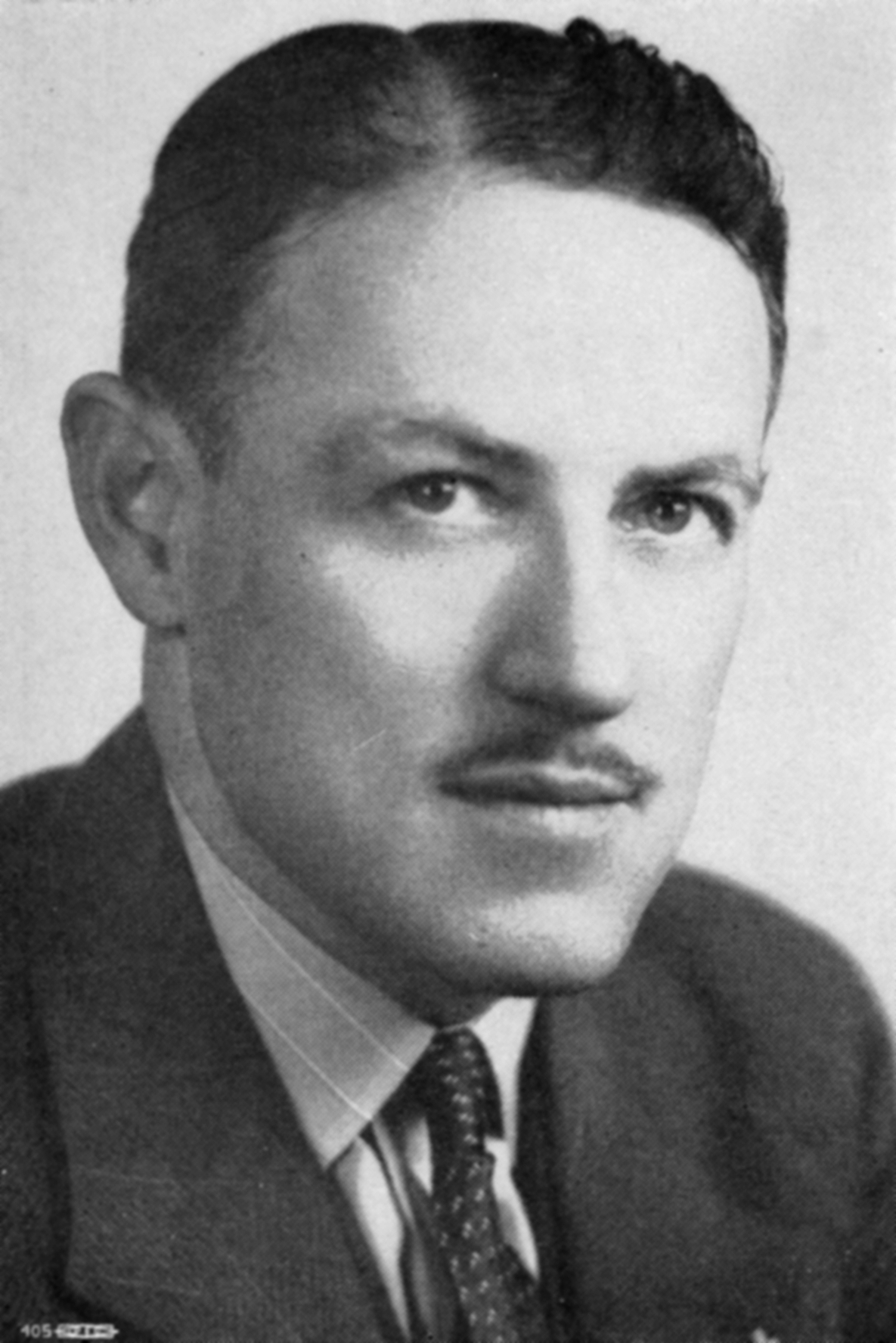
Candidate	Roger Lapham	George R. Reilly
Party	Republican	Democratic
Popular vote	90,646	57,699
Percentage	41.63%	26.50%
Candidate	Angelo Joseph Rossi	Chester MacPhee
Party	Republican	Nonpartisan
Popular vote	47,626	20,346
Percentage	21.87%	9.34%
Mayor before election
Angelo Joseph Rossi
Republican
Elected mayor
Roger Lapham
Republican

The 1943 San Francisco mayoral election was held on November 2, 1943. Roger Lapham was elected with 41% of the vote.

== Results ==
1943 San Francisco mayoral election
Candidate	Votes	%
Roger Lapham	90,646	41.63%
George R. Reilly	57,699	26.50%
Angelo Joseph Rossi	47,626	21.87%
Chester MacPhee	20,346	9.34%
