= Franck R. Havenner =

American politician

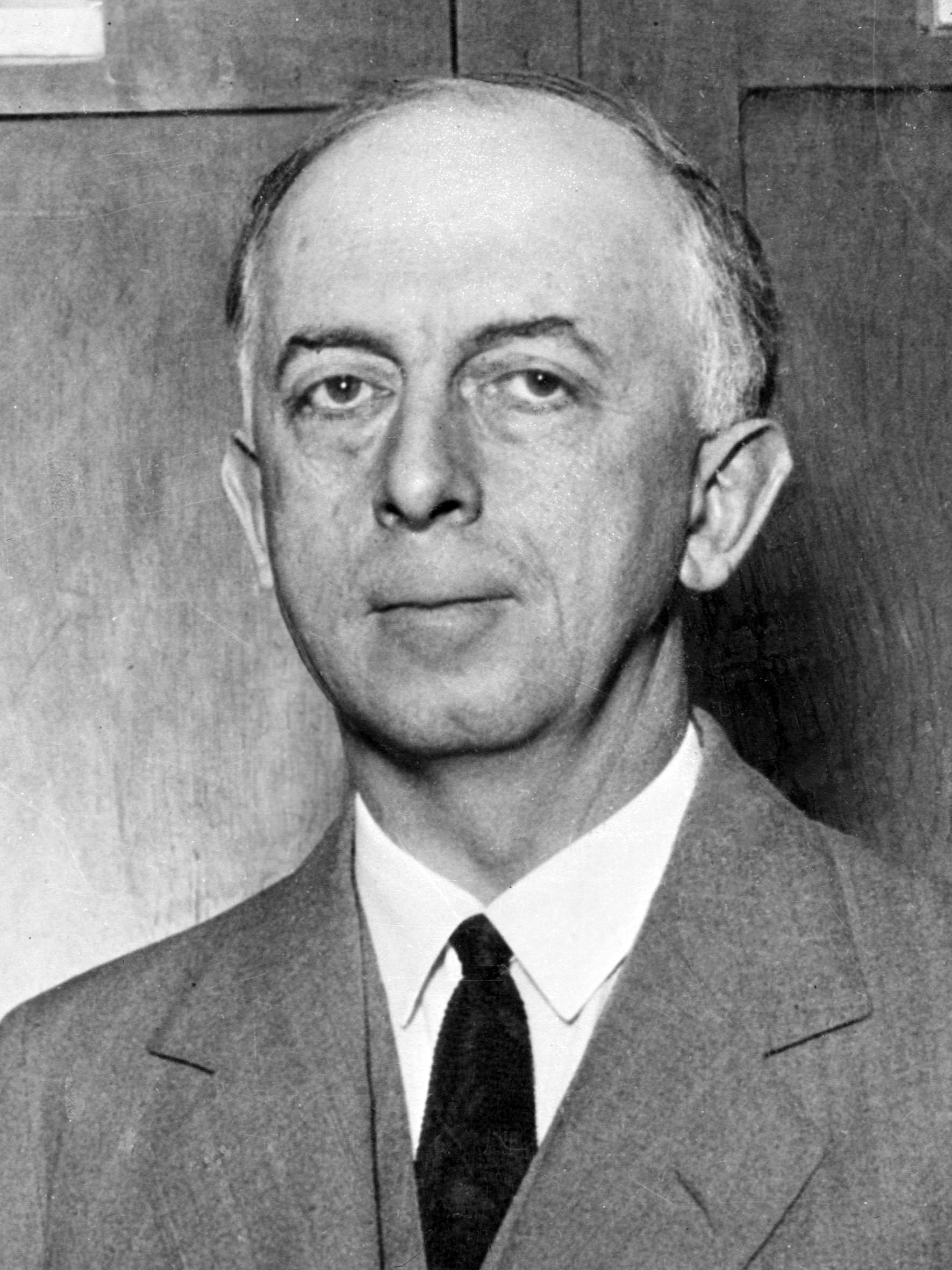
- Havenner in 1933

Member of the U.S. House of Representatives from California's 4th district
- In office January 3, 1945 – January 3, 1953
- Preceded by: Thomas Rolph
- Succeeded by: William S. Mailliard
- In office January 3, 1937 – January 3, 1941
- Preceded by: Florence Prag Kahn
- Succeeded by: Thomas Rolph

Member of the San Francisco Board of Supervisors
- In office 1926–1936
- Preceded by: Frank H. Harris
- Succeeded by: George R. Reilly

Personal details
- Born: Franck Roberts Havenner; September 20, 1882 Sherwood, Maryland
- Died: July 24, 1967 (aged 84) San Francisco, California
- Resting place: Cypress Lawn Memorial Park, Colma, California
- Party: Republican (until 1934), Progressive (1934–1937), Democratic (1937–1967)

Franck Roberts Havenner (September 20, 1882 – July 24, 1967) was an American journalist and politician who served six terms in the United States House of Representatives, from 1937 to 1941 and again from 1945 to 1953, representing California's 4th congressional district. He previously served on the San Francisco Board of Supervisors and ran for mayor of San Francisco in 1939 and 1947.

== Biography ==
Havenner was born in Sherwood, Maryland, on September 20, 1882. He attended Columbian College (now George Washington University) and Stanford University, afterwards working as a journalist in San Francisco. He was senator Hiram Johnson's private secretary from 1917 to 1921.

Havenner served on the San Francisco Board of Supervisors from 1926 to 1936. In 1935, he ran for president of the Board and won. As a supervisor he fought unsuccessfully to fulfill the Raker Act of 1913 and bring public power to the City and County of San Francisco.

=== Congress ===
Re-election advertisement in the City-County Record, November 1946

Originally a Republican, Havenner was elected to the United States House of Representatives in 1936 with the nominations of both the Progressive and Democratic parties against Republican incumbent Florence Prag Kahn. Re-elected in 1938 with the same nominations but reversed in their appearance on the ballot, Havenner finally re-registered as a Democrat. In 1939 (in an officially nonpartisan race), he ran unsuccessfully for mayor against incumbent Angelo Rossi.

Havenner was defeated for re-election to Congress in 1940, subsequently serving as a member of the California Railroad Commission from 1941 to 1944. He won election to Congress again in 1944, serving from 1945 to 1953, during which he became a member of the House Armed Services Committee. In 1947, he again ran unsuccessfully for mayor. In 1952, he was defeated for re-election to Congress by Republican William S. Mailliard. After leaving Congress, he worked for the American Federation of Labor.

=== Death ===
Havenner died in San Francisco on July 24, 1967, and was buried at Cypress Lawn Memorial Park in Colma, California.

== Electoral history ==
1936 United States House of Representatives elections
Party	Candidate	Votes	%
Progressive Party (US, 1924)	Franck R. Havenner	64,063	58.5
Republican	Florence Prag Kahn (Incumbent)	43,805	40.0
Communist	Anita Whitney	1,711	1.5
Total votes		109,579	100.0
Turnout			
Progressive Party (US, 1924) gain from Republican			

1938 United States House of Representatives elections
Party	Candidate	Votes	%
Democratic	Franck R. Havenner (Incumbent)	64,452	61.2
Republican	Kennett B. Dawson	40,842	38.8
Total votes		105,294	100.0
Turnout			
Democratic hold			

1940 United States House of Representatives elections
Party	Candidate	Votes	%
Republican	Thomas Rolph	75,369	54.6
Democratic	Franck R. Havenner (Incumbent)	61,341	44.4
Communist	Archie Brown	1,322	1.0
Total votes		138,032	100.0
Turnout			
Republican gain from Democratic			

1944 United States House of Representatives elections
Party	Candidate	Votes	%
Democratic	Franck R. Havenner	73,582	50.1
Republican	Thomas Rolph (Incumbent)	73,367	49.9
Total votes		146,949	100.0
Turnout			
Democratic gain from Republican			

1946 United States House of Representatives elections
Party	Candidate	Votes	%
Democratic	Franck R. Havenner (Incumbent)	60,655	52.9
Republican	Truman R. Young	54,113	47.1
Total votes		114,768	100.0
Turnout			
Democratic hold			

1948 United States House of Representatives elections
Party	Candidate	Votes	%
Democratic	Franck R. Havenner (Incumbent)	73,704	51.0
Republican	William S. Mailliard	68,875	47.7
Progressive	Francis J. McTernan Jr.	1,949	1.3
Total votes		144,528	100.0
Turnout			
Democratic hold			

1950 United States House of Representatives elections
Party	Candidate	Votes	%
Democratic	Franck R. Havenner (Incumbent)	83,078	67.2
Republican	Raymond D. Smith	40,569	32.8
Total votes		123,647	100.0
Turnout			
Democratic hold			

1952 United States House of Representatives elections
Party	Candidate	Votes	%
Republican	William S. Mailliard	102,359	55
Democratic	Franck R. Havenner (Incumbent)	83,748	45
Total votes		186,107	100
Turnout			
Republican gain from Democratic			

U.S. House of Representatives
Preceded by Florence Prag Kahn	Member of the U.S. House of Representatives from California's 4th congressional district 1937–1941	Succeeded by Thomas Rolph
Preceded by Thomas Rolph	Member of the U.S. House of Representatives from California's 4th congressional district 1945–1953	Succeeded by William S. Mailliard
