= Julius Kahn (politician) =

American politician (1861–1924)

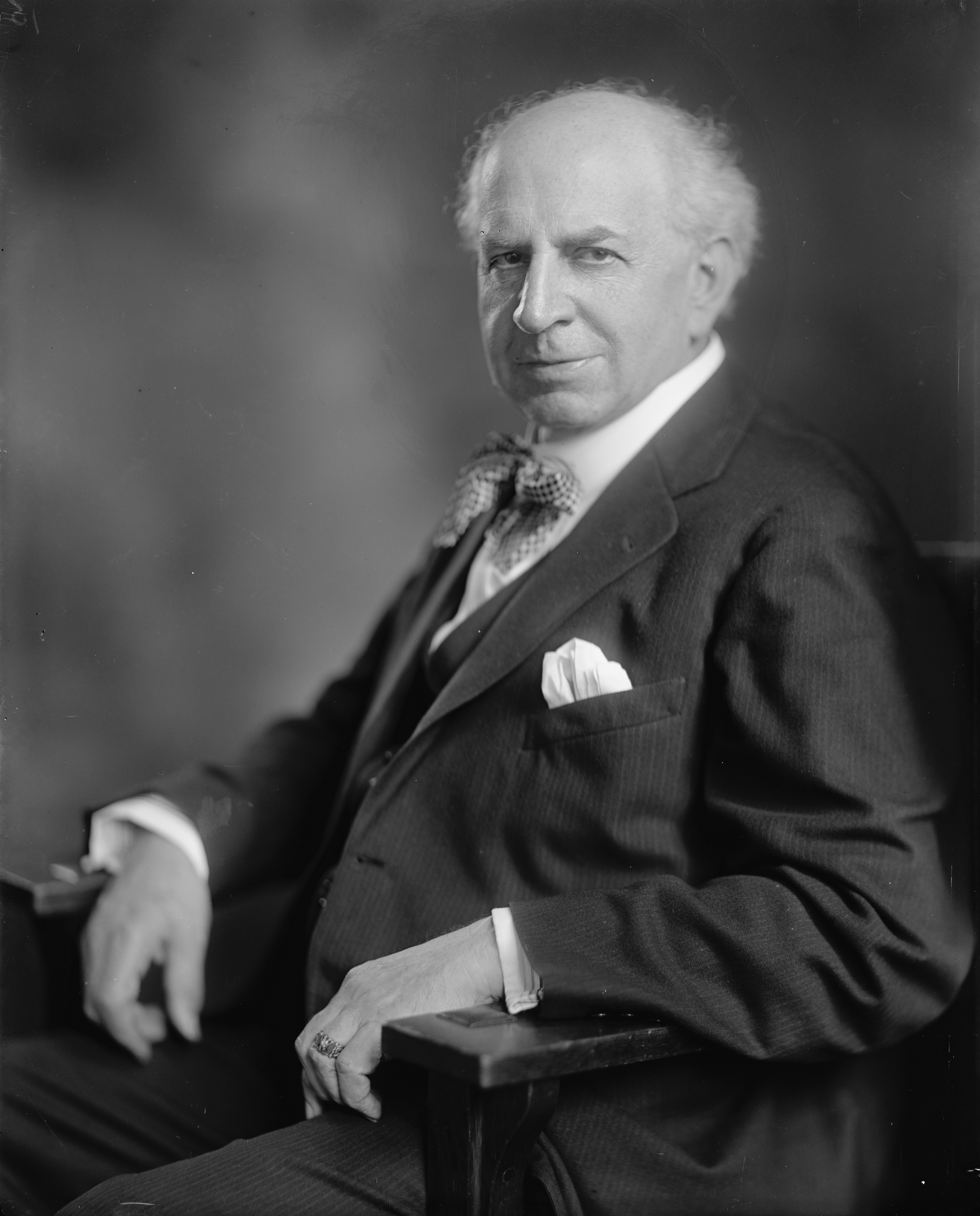
- Portrait by Harris & Ewing c. 1920s

Member of the U.S. House of Representatives from California's 4th district
- In office March 4, 1905 – December 18, 1924
- Preceded by: Edward J. Livernash
- Succeeded by: Florence Prag Kahn
- In office March 4, 1899 – March 3, 1903
- Preceded by: James G. Maguire
- Succeeded by: Edward J. Livernash

Member of the California State Assembly from the 39th district
- In office January 2, 1893 – January 7, 1895
- Preceded by: Charles S. Arms
- Succeeded by: H. G. W. Dinkelspiel

Personal details
- Born: February 28, 1861 Kuppenheim, German Confederation
- Died: December 18, 1924 (aged 63) San Francisco, California, U.S.
- Party: Republican
- Spouse: Florence Prag Kahn (m. 1899)

Julius Kahn (February 28, 1861 – December 18, 1924) was a United States Congressman who was succeeded by his wife Florence Prag Kahn after his death. He has been described by the American Jerusalem as "among the most influential Jews in San Francisco—as well as national–civic life, from the middle of the 19th century into the 1930s".

== Biography ==
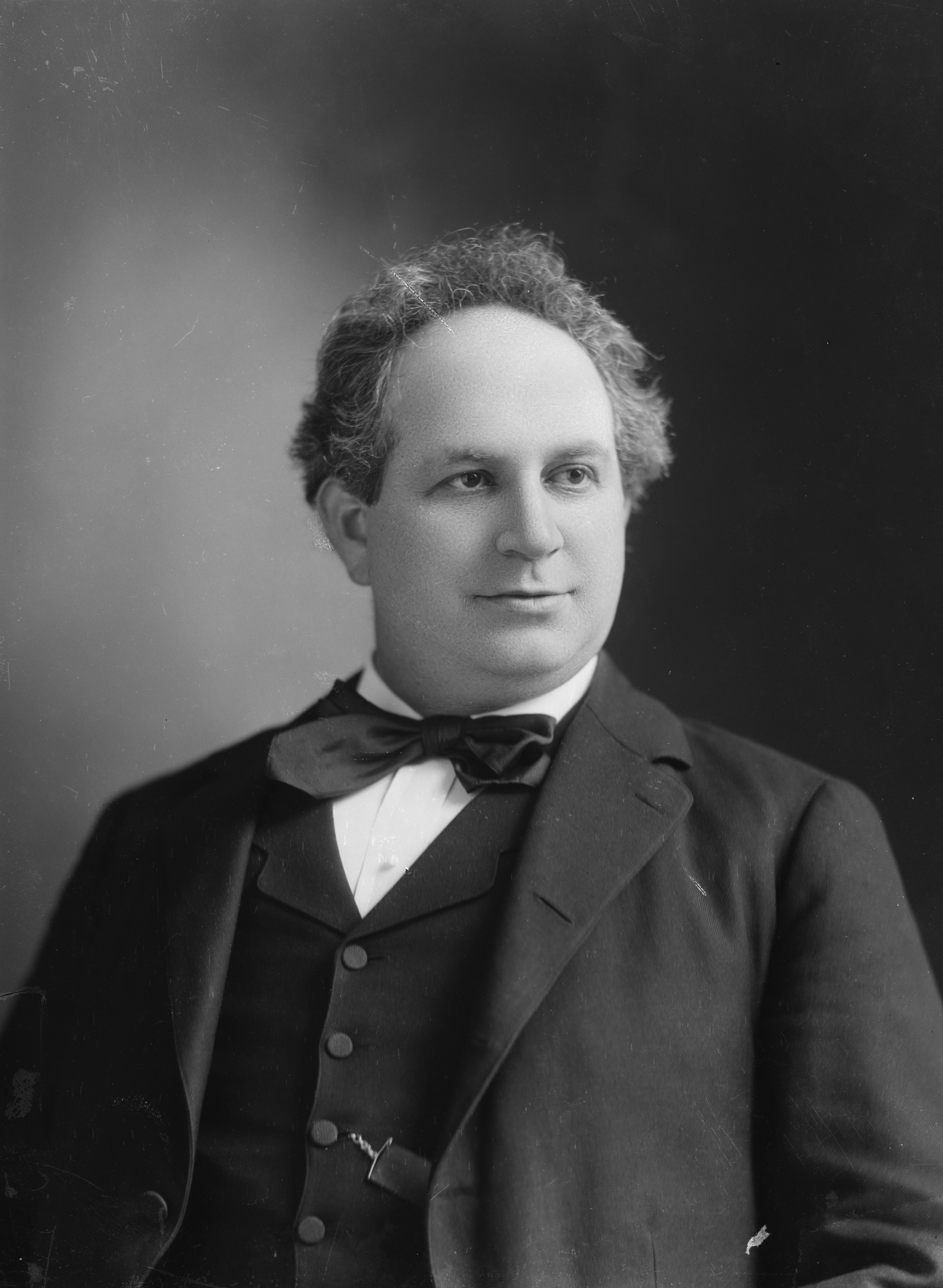
Portrait by C. M. Bell c. 1899–1901

Kahn was born in Kuppenheim, in the Grand Duchy of Baden, in what would become Germany. He immigrated to the United States with his parents, who settled in California in 1866. After studying law in San Francisco, he was elected a member of the State Assembly in 1892 and admitted to the bar in January 1894. He was elected as a Republican to the 56th and 57th Congresses (March 4, 1899 – March 3, 1903). Although he unsuccessfully contested the election of Edward J. Livernash to the 58th Congress, he was elected to the 59th and to the nine succeeding Congresses and served from March 4, 1905, until his death in 1924.

During his time in the House of Representatives he was noted as an advocate of military preparedness. He helped draft and secure the passage of the National Defense Act of 1916, the Selective Service Act of 1917, and the National Defense Act of 1920. He served as chairman of Committee on Military Affairs (66th–68th Congresses). Representative Kahn also authored the Kahn Exclusion Act, ultimately enacted as the Alien Exclusion Act, telling Congress that "I submit if the Chinese people themselves would deal honestly with us, and if they resorted less to trickery and duplicity to circumvent our laws, then there would be no need of closing up all possible loopholes in the law with the seemingly severely restrictive measures that the Chinese themselves make necessary."

At the time of his death, he had been re-elected to the 69th Congress. His wife, Florence Prag Kahn, succeeded him in Congress and served until 1937. He was buried in the Home of Peace Cemetery in Colma, California. A well-known playground and adjacent ballpark in San Francisco was named in his honor; in 2018, it was proposed to strip his name from the playground due to the fact that he championed the extension of the Chinese Exclusion Act in 1902 which he justified by stating that the Chinese people were "morally, the most debased people on the face of the earth."

== Electoral history ==
Julius Kahn electoral history

1898 United States House of Representatives elections
Party	Candidate	Votes	%
Republican	Julius Kahn	13,695	50.0
Democratic	James H. Barry	12,084	44.1
Socialist Labor	W. J. Martin	1,006	3.7
Independent	Joseph P. Kelly	594	2.2
Total votes		27,379	100.0
Turnout			
Republican gain from Democratic			

1900 United States House of Representatives elections
Party	Candidate	Votes	%
Republican	Julius Kahn (Incumbent)	17,111	55.2
Democratic	R. Porter Ashe	11,742	37.8
Independent	C. C. O'Donnell	1,116	3.6
Socialist	G. B. Benham	969	3.1
Prohibition	Joseph Rowell	84	0.3
Total votes		31,022	100.0
Turnout			
Republican hold			

1902 United States House of Representatives elections
Party	Candidate	Votes	%
Democratic	Edward J. Livernash	16,146	49.2
Republican	Julius Kahn (Incumbent)	16,005	48.7
Socialist	William Costley	616	1.9
Prohibition	Joseph Rowell	69	0.2
Total votes		16,836	100.0
Turnout			
Democratic gain from Republican			

1904 United States House of Representatives elections
Party	Candidate	Votes	%
Republican	Julius Kahn	20,012	57.0
Democratic	Edward J. Livernash (Incumbent)	12,812	36.4
Socialist	William Costley	2,267	6.4
Total votes		35,091	100.0
Turnout			
Republican gain from Democratic			

1906 United States House of Representatives elections
Party	Candidate	Votes	%
Republican	Julius Kahn (Incumbent)	5,678	62.4
Democratic	David S. Hirshberg	3,016	33.2
Socialist	Oliver Everett	399	4.4
Total votes		9,093	100.0
Turnout			
Republican hold			

1908 United States House of Representatives elections
Party	Candidate	Votes	%
Republican	Julius Kahn (Incumbent)	9,202	52.7
Democratic	James G. Maguire	7,497	42.9
Socialist	K. J. Doyle	699	4.0
Prohibition	William N. Meserve	60	0.3
Total votes		17,458	100.0
Turnout			
Republican hold			

1910 United States House of Representatives elections
Party	Candidate	Votes	%
Republican	Julius Kahn (Incumbent)	10,188	56.5
Democratic	Walter MacArthur	6,636	36.8
Socialist	Austin Lewis	1,178	6.5
Prohibition	E. F. Dinsmore	35	0.2
Total votes		18,037	100.0
Turnout			
Republican hold			

1912 United States House of Representatives elections
Party	Candidate	Votes	%
Republican	Julius Kahn (Incumbent)	25,515	56.1
Democratic	Bert Schlesinger	14,884	32.7
Socialist	Norman W. Pendleton	5,090	11.2
Total votes		45,489	100.0
Turnout			
Republican hold			

1914 United States House of Representatives elections
Party	Candidate	Votes	%
Republican	Julius Kahn (Incumbent)	41,044	69.1
Democratic	Henry Colombat	13,550	22.8
Socialist	Allen K. Gifford	3,928	6.6
Prohibition	J. C. Westenberg	895	1.5
Total votes		59,417	100.0
Turnout			
Republican hold			

1916 United States House of Representatives elections
Party	Candidate	Votes	%
Republican	Julius Kahn (Incumbent)	51,968	77.2
Democratic	J. M. Fernald	10,579	15.7
Socialist	Allen K. Gifford	3,775	5.6
Prohibition	Henry W. Hutchinson	981	1.5
Total votes		67,303	100.0
Turnout			
Republican hold			

1918 United States House of Representatives elections
Party	Candidate	Votes	%
Republican	Julius Kahn (Incumbent)	38,278	86.6
Socialist	Hugo Ernst	5,913	13.4
Total votes		43,191	100.0
Turnout			
Republican hold			

1920 United States House of Representatives elections
Party	Candidate	Votes	%
Republican	Julius Kahn (Incumbent)	50,841	84.6
Socialist	Hugo Ernst	9,289	15.4
Total votes		60,130	100.0
Turnout			
Republican hold			

1922 United States House of Representatives elections
Party	Candidate	Votes	%
Republican	Julius Kahn (Incumbent)	46,527	83
Socialist	Hugo Ernst	9,547	17
Total votes		56,074	100
Turnout			
Republican hold			

1924 United States House of Representatives elections
Party	Candidate	Votes	%
Republican	Julius Kahn (Incumbent)	44,048	81
Socialist	William McDevitt	10,360	19
Total votes		54,408	100
Turnout			
Republican hold			

== Source materials ==
The Western Jewish History Center, of the Magnes Collection of Jewish Art and Life, in Berkeley, California has a large collection of family papers, documents, correspondence, and photographs relating to Julius Kahn and to his wife, Florence Prag Kahn.

== See also ==
- List of Jewish members of the United States Congress
- List of members of the United States Congress who died in office (1900–1949)

Political offices
Preceded by Charles S. Arms	California State Assemblyman, 39th District; 1893–1895	Succeeded by H. G. W. Dinkelspiel
U.S. House of Representatives
Preceded by James G. Maguire	Member of the U.S. House of Representatives from California's 4th congressional district 1899–1903	Succeeded by Edward J. Livernash
Preceded by Edward J. Livernash	Member of the U.S. House of Representatives from California's 4th congressional district 1905–1924	Succeeded by Florence Prag Kahn
