= The American Ruling Class =

- Directed by: John Kirby
- Written by: Lewis H. Lapham
- Produced by: Libby Handros
- Starring: Lewis H. Lapham; Paul Cantagallo; Caton Burwell
- Cinematography: Mark Benjamin
- Edited by: John Kirby; Leah O'Donnell
- Music by: Qasim Naqvi; Lucas Johnson-Yahraus
- Distributed by: The Alive Mind
- Release date: April 26, 2005
- Running time: 100 minutes
- Countries: United Kingdom; United States
- Language: English

The American Ruling Class is a 2005 dramatic documentary film written by Lewis H. Lapham and directed by John Kirby that "explores our country’s most taboo topic: class, power and privilege in our nominally democratic republic." It seeks to answer the question, "Does America have a ruling class?" Its producers consider it the first "dramatic-documentary-musical." A rough-cut of the film was shown at the 2005 Tribeca Film Festival, the final version of the film was shown on the Sundance Channel in July 2007, and it had its theatrical premiere at the Brooklyn Academy of Music in April 2008.

== Plot ==
The film stars Lewis H. Lapham, who plays himself as editor of Harper's Magazine. Lapham opens the film with the question of whether or not America has a "ruling class," a circle of wealthy and powerful families that run the banks, businesses, and government, essentially controlling everything in America.

To answer this question, Lapham devises a fictional scenario following the post-graduation paths of two young Yale graduates, themselves from opposite economic beginnings. The paths they take gradually clue them, and the audience, into the reality posed by the question.

Caton Burwell plays "Jack Bellami," a recent Yale graduate who comes from a rich family. Unlike his family or his friends, Jack seems unsure of what he wants to do with his life and wonders how he could make a difference in the world. Jack ultimately decides to become a banker, working at Goldman Sachs. He chooses the job after coming to the conclusion that the banking industry controls the world and that it would be easier and more effective to become a part of the system in order to change it from within.

Paul Cantagallo plays "Mike Vanzetti," another recent Yale graduate who is best friends with Jack Bellami. Unlike his friend, Mike is from a middle-class background, meaning he isn't wealthy like his friend Jack. Mike wants to change the world from outside the system. He decides to become a writer and goes headfirst into the character, renting a studio apartment and getting a job as a waiter. He refuses to "sell out" by way of writing for a major newspaper or by "pandering to the masses" by writing "lowest-common-denominator" material.

Mike's story takes center stage in the second half of the film, after Jack's decision to join Goldman and his subsequent success there. A run-in with Mike leads Jack to offer him a job at the company, an offer Mike initially rejects. As his student-loan bills start piling up, however, Mike begins to resent his lack of money and low-paying job, as well as the inability of his writing to enact change. Mike's girlfriend, Taylor, invites him to a wealthy friend's party, at which she encourages him to continue his work. A short time after the party, Lapham invites Mike to take a trip to a "space that used to be called, in another age of man, Mexico." This land was Texas. In Texas, Lapham shows Mike how the powerful control the government, and how money, in the end, trumps any effort by the non-wealthy to alter society.

Ultimately, Mike decides to abandon his writerly dream and takes up Jack's job offer. During a visit to Taylor's mansion home, Mike plays a game of tennis with his girlfriend and they discuss his decision. Taylor is horrified with his new defeatist attitude. Mike lectures his girlfriend on his new worldview: that money is all that matters, and that, as society goes to hell, wealth is one's only defense against the routine abuses and corruption of the ruling class.

The film then splits with two endings. The first shows Mike during his first day as a banker, zooming in on him at an initiation program: His panic and displeasure are evident as he immediately regrets what he has done.

The second ending (which an on-screen graphic claims was filmed after test audiences reacted poorly to the first ending) has Mike sidetracked when he agrees to watch a stage show. It is being rehearsed by the lead singer of "THE WHATS?" and a group of children. The song they play discusses the themes of the film. The film ends with Mike in the woods, leaving the viewer in the dark on the question of whether Mike makes it to work or has his mind changed by the song.

== Interviews ==
The following people are interviewed:

- Robert Altman
- James A. Baker III
- Bill Bradley
- Harold Brown
- Hodding Carter III
- William T. Coleman Jr.
- Walter Cronkite
- Barbara Ehrenreich
- Martin Garbus
- Vartan Gregorian
- Doug Henwood
- Mike Medavoy
- Joseph S. Nye Jr.
- Samuel Peabody
- John Perkins
- Peter G. Peterson
- Peter Seeger
- Lawrence H. Summers
- Arthur Ochs Sulzberger Jr.
- William Howard Taft IV
- Kurt Vonnegut
- Howard Zinn

Kurt Vonnegut and Robert Altman both died before the final cut of the film was aired on Sundance Channel. Pre-fame Azealia Banks appears in an uncredited cameo as a singing/dancing child.

== See also ==
- The Corporation
