= Thomas Rolph =

American politician

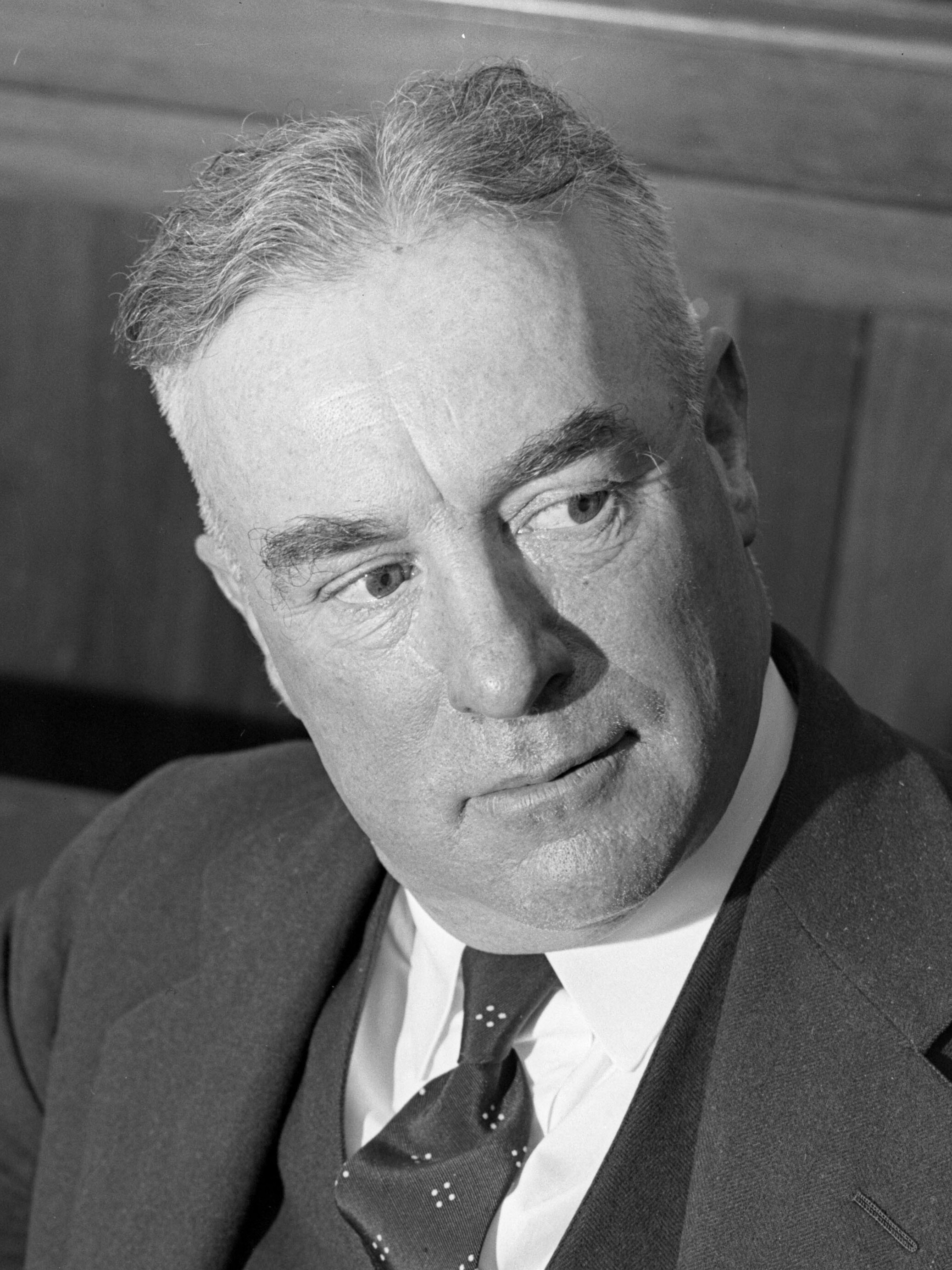
- Rolph in 1938

Member of the U.S. House of Representatives from California's 4th district
- In office January 3, 1941 – January 3, 1945
- Preceded by: Franck R. Havenner
- Succeeded by: Franck R. Havenner

Personal details
- Born: January 17, 1885 San Francisco, California
- Died: May 10, 1956 (aged 71) San Francisco, California
- Resting place: Cypress Lawn Memorial Park, Colma, California
- Party: Republican
- Relatives: James Rolph (brother)

Thomas Rolph (January 17, 1885 – May 10, 1956) was an American businessman and politician who served two terms as a United States representative from California. His older brother, James Rolph Jr., was elected Mayor of San Francisco in 1911 and served until he was elected Governor of California in 1930.

== Biography ==
Rolph was born in San Francisco, California. He attended public schools and graduated from Humboldt Evening High School. In 1912, he founded a building materials sales agency, which he headed until his death.

=== Congress ===
Rolph was elected as a Republican to the Seventy-seventh and Seventy-eighth Congresses (January 3, 1941 - January 3, 1945). He was an unsuccessful candidate for reelection in 1944 to the Seventy-ninth Congress.

=== Later career and death ===
He returned to his building material sales agency and died in San Francisco in 1956. He was buried in Cypress Lawn Memorial Park, Colma, San Mateo County, California.

U.S. House of Representatives
Preceded by Franck R. Havenner	Member of the U.S. House of Representatives from California's 4th congressional district 1941–1945	Succeeded by Franck R. Havenner
