= 1931 San Francisco mayoral election =

- November 3, 1931
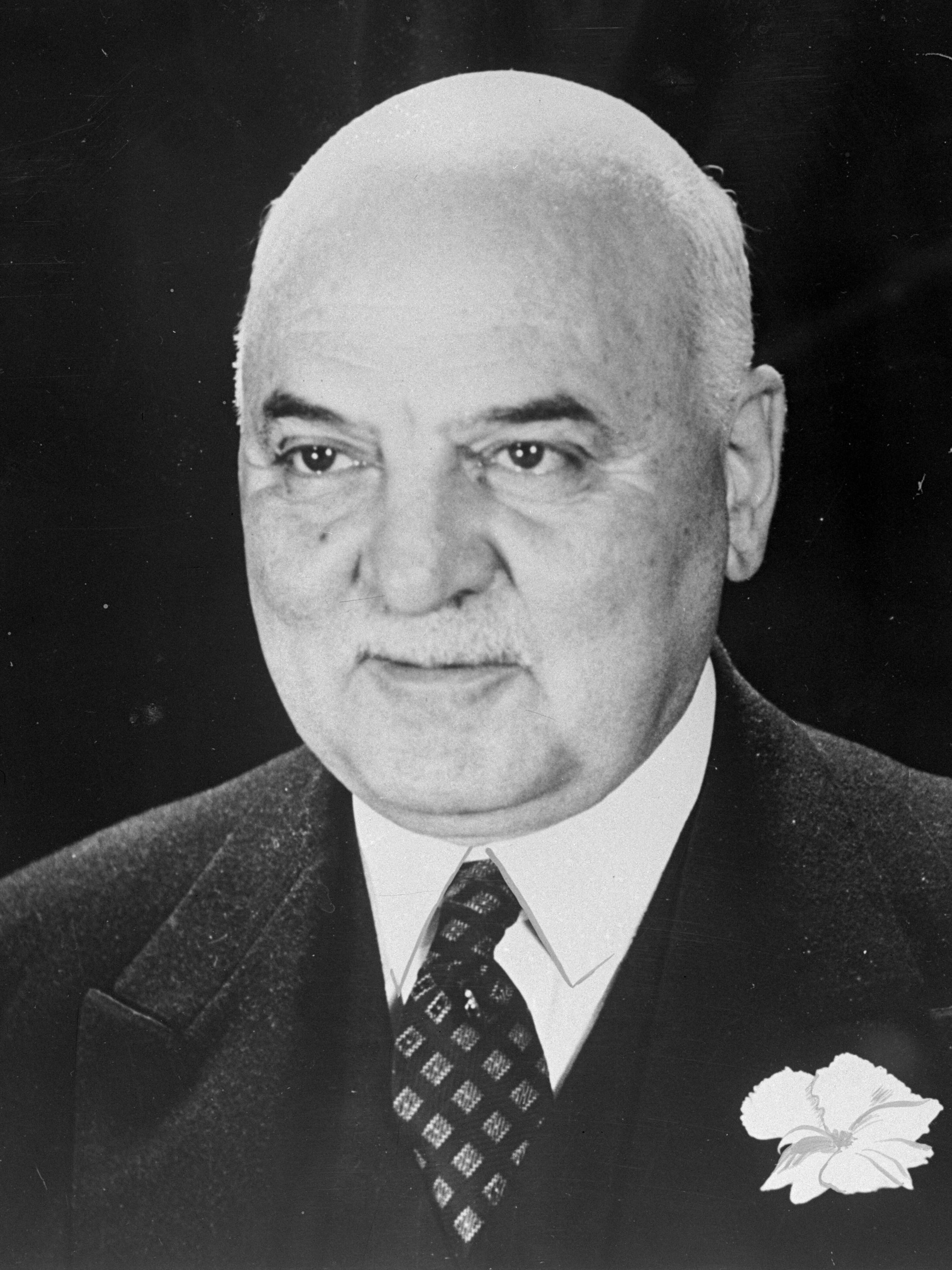

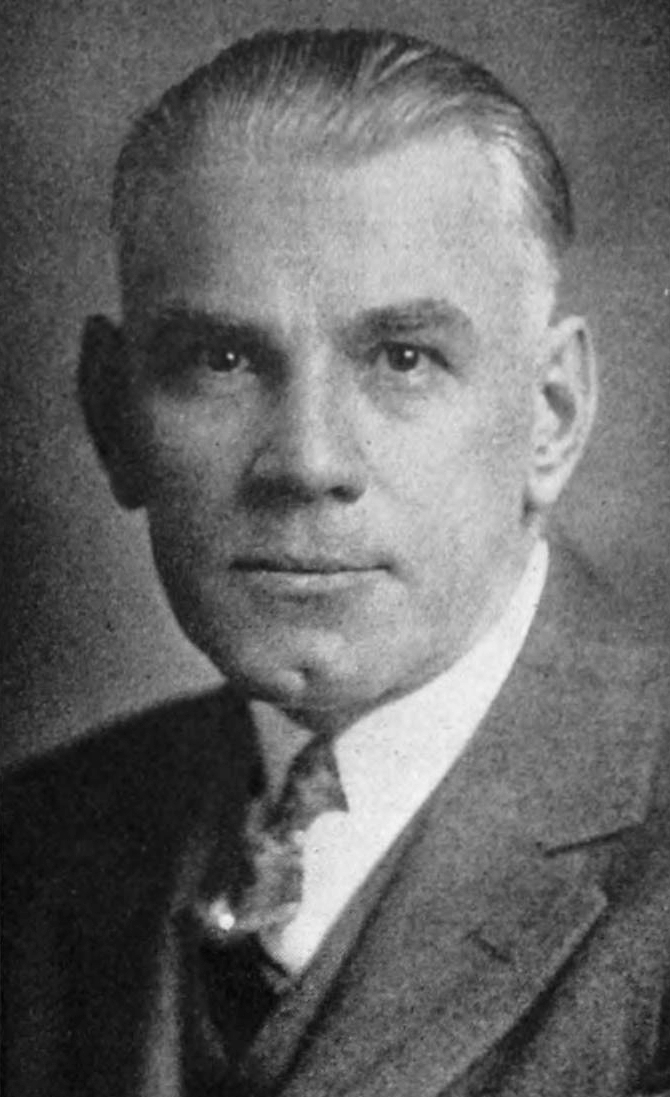
Candidate	Angelo Joseph Rossi	Adolph Uhl
Party	Republican	Nonpartisan
Popular vote	76,550	69,743
Percentage	51.33%	46.77%
Mayor before election
Angelo Joseph Rossi
Republican
Elected mayor
Angelo Joseph Rossi
Republican

The 1931 San Francisco mayoral election was held on November 3, 1931. Incumbent mayor Angelo Joseph Rossi was re-elected with 51% of the vote.

== Results ==
1931 San Francisco mayoral election
Candidate	Votes	%
Angelo Joseph Rossi	76,550	51.33%
Adolph Uhl	69,743	46.77%
Sam Darcy	1,406	0.94%
John E. Hines	620	0.42%
Alexander Horr	574	0.39%
William T. valentine	236	0.16%
