= Florence Prag Kahn =

American politician (1866–1948)

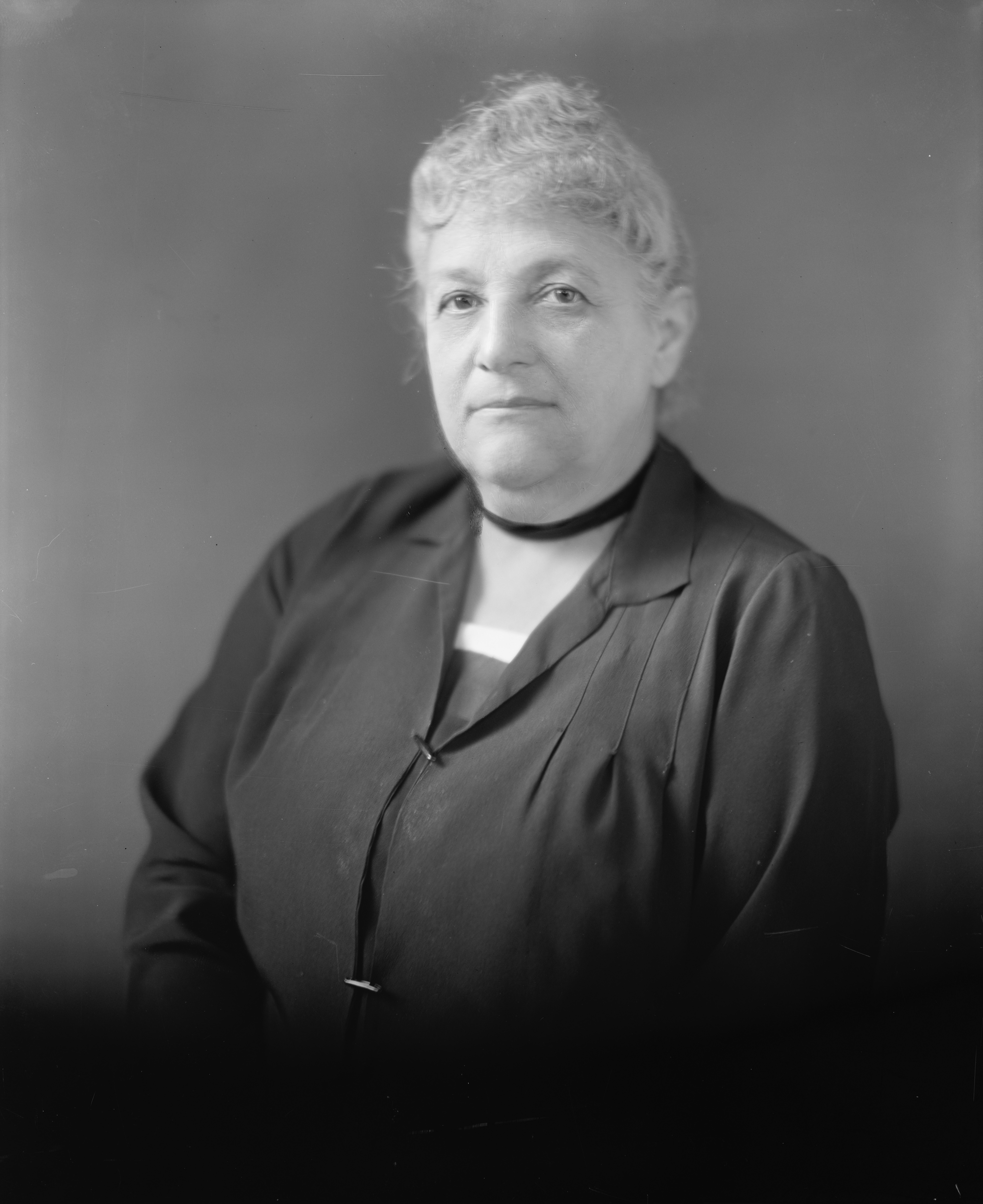
- Portrait by Harris & Ewing c. 1925–1937

Member of the U.S. House of Representatives from California's 4th district
- In office March 4, 1925 – January 3, 1937
- Preceded by: Julius Kahn
- Succeeded by: Franck R. Havenner

Personal details
- Born: Florence Prag; November 9, 1866 Salt Lake City, Utah, U.S.
- Died: November 16, 1948 (aged 82) San Francisco, California, U.S.
- Resting place: Home of Peace Cemetery in Colma, California
- Party: Republican
- Spouse: Julius Kahn (m. 1899; died 1924)
- Education: University of California, Berkeley

Florence Kahn (née Prag; November 9, 1866 – November 16, 1948) was an American teacher and politician who in 1925 became the first Jewish woman to serve in the United States Congress. She was only the fifth woman to serve in Congress, and the second from California, after fellow San Franciscan Mae Nolan. Like Nolan, she took the seat in the House of Representatives left vacant by the death of her husband, Julius Kahn.

== Life and career ==
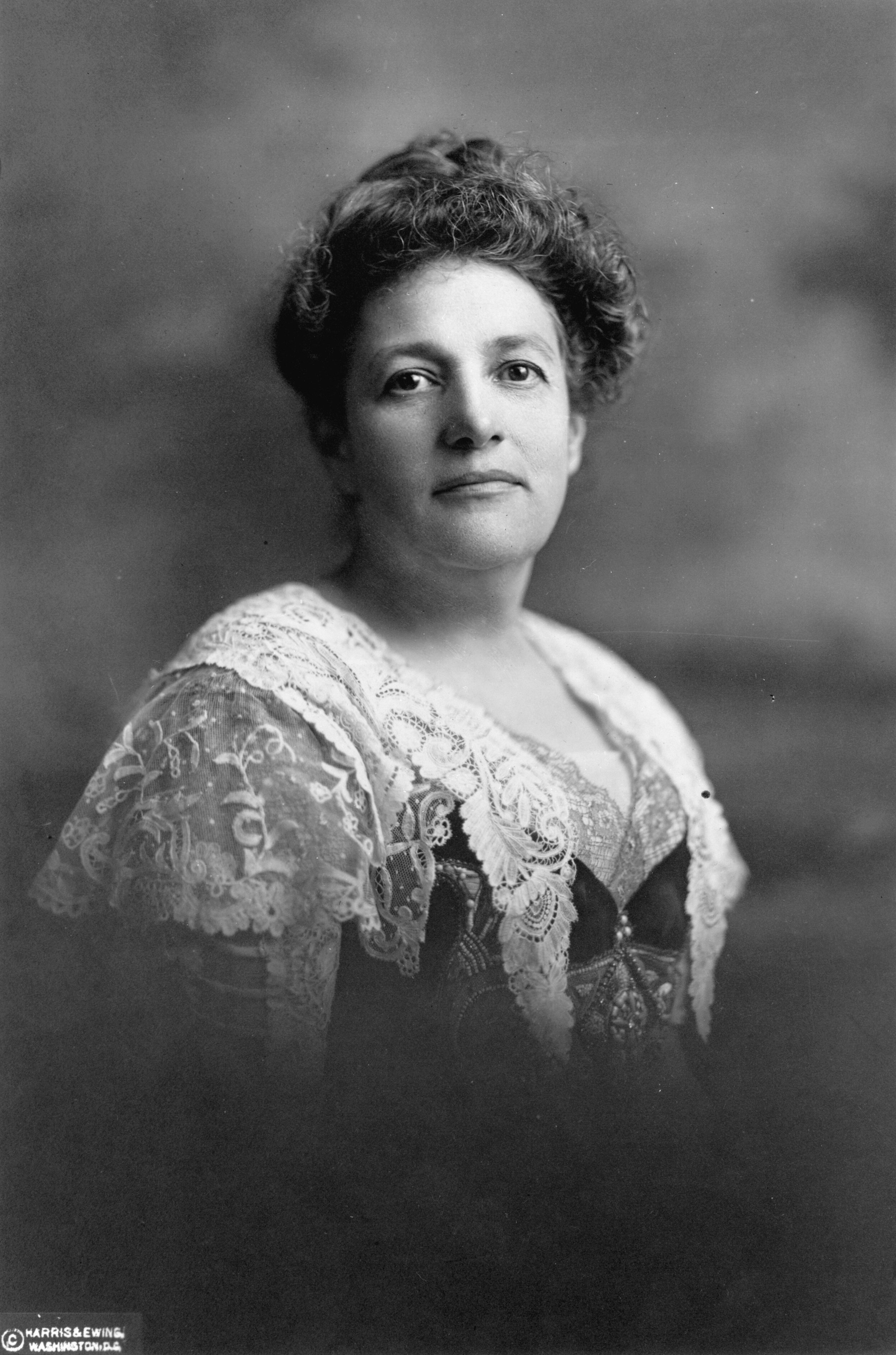
Portrait by Harris & Ewing c. 1914

Kahn was born in Salt Lake City, Utah to Conrad and Mary Prag, Jewish Polish immigrants who befriended the Mormon leader Brigham Young, and sold supplies during the gold rush. Her family moved to San Francisco, California in 1869. She graduated from the San Francisco Girls' High School in 1883, and received an A.B. from the University of California, Berkeley in 1887. She taught high school English and History at Lowell High School. She married Julius Kahn on March 19, 1899, who served in Congress until his death on December 18, 1924. She was his aide and, in parallel, she would write articles in the San Francisco Chronicle.

=== Congress ===
Florence Kahn was elected as a Republican to the 69th Congress, by special election, to fill the vacancy caused by the death of her husband, who had just been re-elected to a 13th term. She was reelected to the 70th, 71st, 72nd, 73rd, and 74th Congresses, serving from December 7, 1925, to January 3, 1937. She replaced her husband and became the first woman on the House Military Affairs Committee.

Kahn supported Herbert Hoover's unsuccessful campaign against Franklin Delano Roosevelt in the 1932 presidential election. She was an unsuccessful candidate for reelection to the 75th Congress in 1936.

=== Later career ===
Afterwards, Kahn actively tried to get women involved in politics. She was a member of the American Association of University Women, Hadassah and the Council of Jewish Women. She was a Reform Jew, and belonged to Congregation Emanu-El of San Francisco.

=== Death and burial ===
Kahn died in San Francisco on November 16, 1948, and was interred in the Home of Peace Cemetery in Colma, California.

== Location of source materials relating to Florence Prag Kahn ==
The Western Jewish History Center, of the Magnes Collection of Jewish Art and Life in Berkeley, California has a large collection of family papers, documents, correspondence, and photographs relating to Florence Prag Kahn and to her husband, Julius Kahn.

== Electoral history ==
1926 United States House of Representatives elections
Party	Candidate	Votes	%
Republican	Florence Prag Kahn (Incumbent)	37,353	63.4
Democratic	Chauncey F. Tramutulo	18,210	32.5
Socialist	Harry W. Hutton	2,960	5.1
Total votes		58,523	100.0
Turnout			
Republican hold			

1928 United States House of Representatives elections
Party	Candidate	Votes	%
Republican	Florence Prag Kahn (Incumbent)	50,206	76
Independent	Harry W. Hutton	16,838	24
Total votes		67,044	100
Turnout			
Republican hold			

1930 United States House of Representatives elections
Party	Candidate	Votes	%
Republican	Florence Prag Kahn (Incumbent)	47,397	100.0
Turnout			
Republican hold			

1932 United States House of Representatives elections
Party	Candidate	Votes	%
Republican	Florence Prag Kahn (Incumbent)	67,425	85.3
Socialist	Milen C. Dempster	11,603	14.7
Total votes		79,028	100.0
Turnout			
Republican hold			

1934 United States House of Representatives elections
Party	Candidate	Votes	%
Republican	Florence Prag Kahn (Incumbent)	50,491	48.0
Democratic	Chauncey Tramutolo	46,871	44.5
Progressive Party (US, 1924)	Raymond A. Burr	3,636	3.5
Socialist	Samuel S. White	2,414	2.3
Communist	Minnie Carson	1,810	1.7
Total votes		105,222	100.0
Turnout			
Republican hold			

1936 United States House of Representatives elections
Party	Candidate	Votes	%
Progressive Party (US, 1924)	Franck R. Havenner	64,063	58.5
Republican	Florence Prag Kahn (Incumbent)	43,805	40.0
Communist	Anita Whitney	1,711	1.5
Total votes		109,579	100.0
Turnout			
Progressive Party (US, 1924) gain from Republican			

== See also ==
- List of Jewish members of the United States Congress
- Women in the United States House of Representatives

U.S. House of Representatives
Preceded by Julius Kahn	Member of the U.S. House of Representatives from California's 4th congressional district 1925–1937	Succeeded by Franck R. Havenner
