= Friedel Klussmann =

Member of San Francisco society

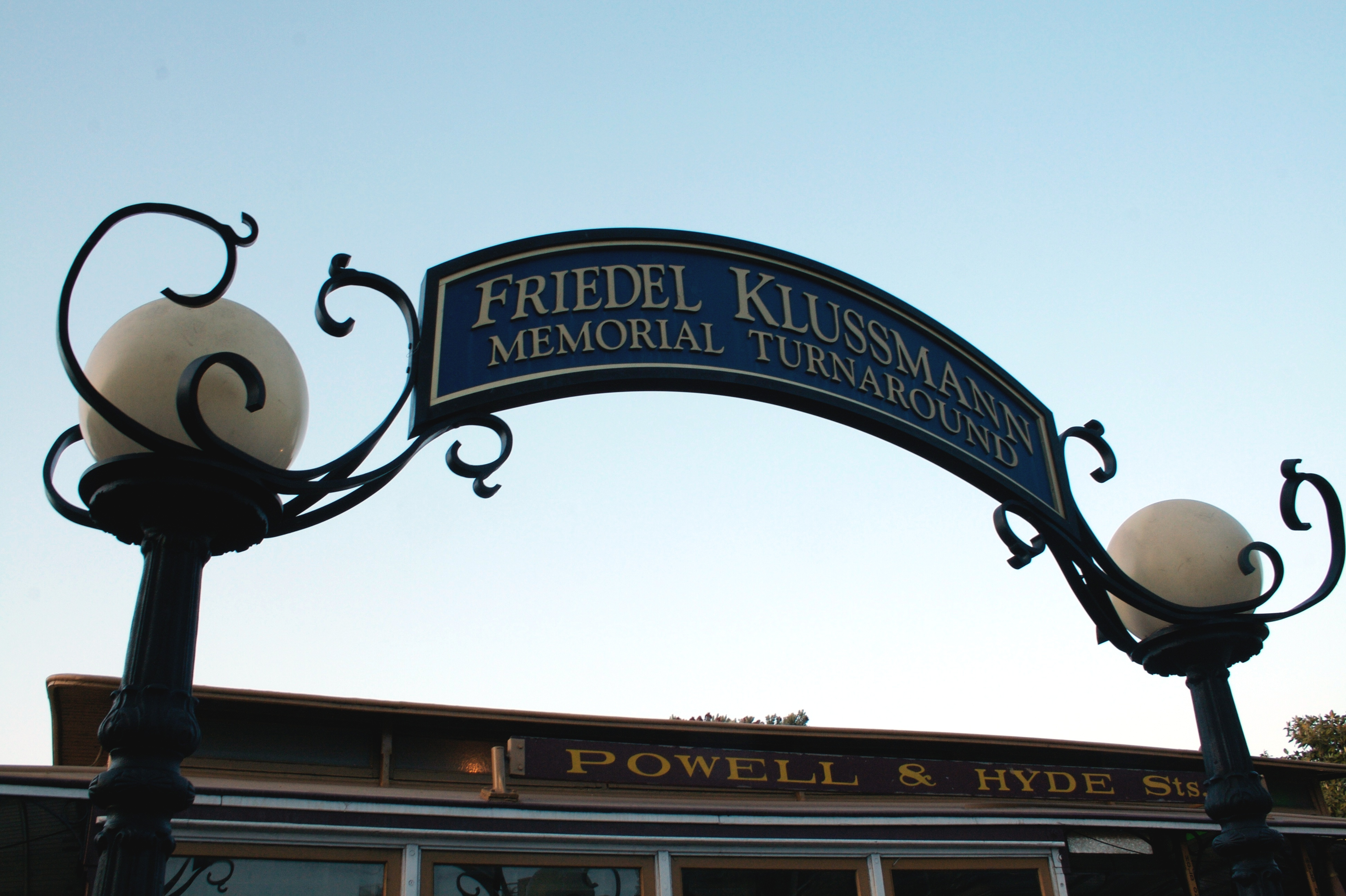
The Friedel Klussmann Memorial Turnaround is the cable car terminus on Hyde Street near Fisherman's Wharf

Friedel Klussmann (1896–1986) was a prominent member of San Francisco society. She is credited with leading the campaign that saved the San Francisco cable car system in the 1940s and 1950s, and the foundation of the San Francisco Beautiful organization in 1947.

== Friedel Klussmann and the Cable Cars ==
In 1947, Mayor of San Francisco Roger Lapham proposed the closure of the two Powell Street cable car lines, which were owned by the city as part of the San Francisco Municipal Railway. In response to a joint meeting of 27 women's civic groups, led by Friedel Klussmann, formed the Citizens' Committee to Save the Cable Cars. In a famous battle of wills, the citizen's committee eventually forced a referendum on an amendment to the city charter, compelling the city to continue operating the Powell Street lines. This passed overwhelmingly with 166,989 yes votes to 51,457 no votes.

In 1951, the three cable car lines owned by the private California Street Cable Railroad (Cal Cable) were shut down when the company was unable to afford insurance. The city purchased and re-opened the lines in 1952, but the amendment to the city charter did not protect these lines, and the city proceeded with plans to replace them with buses. Again Mrs. Klussmann came to the rescue, but with less success this time. The result was a compromise protected system made up of the California Street line from Cal Cable, the Powell-Mason line already in municipal ownership, and a third hybrid line made up by grafting the Hyde Street section of Cal Cable's O'Farrell, Jones & Hyde line onto a truncated Powell-Washington-Jackson line (now known as the Powell-Hyde line).

When Klussmann died at the age of 90 in 1986, the cable cars were decorated in black in her memory. In 1997, the city dedicated the turntable at the outer terminal of the Powell-Hyde line to Klussmann.
