= 1939 San Francisco mayoral election =

- November 7, 1939
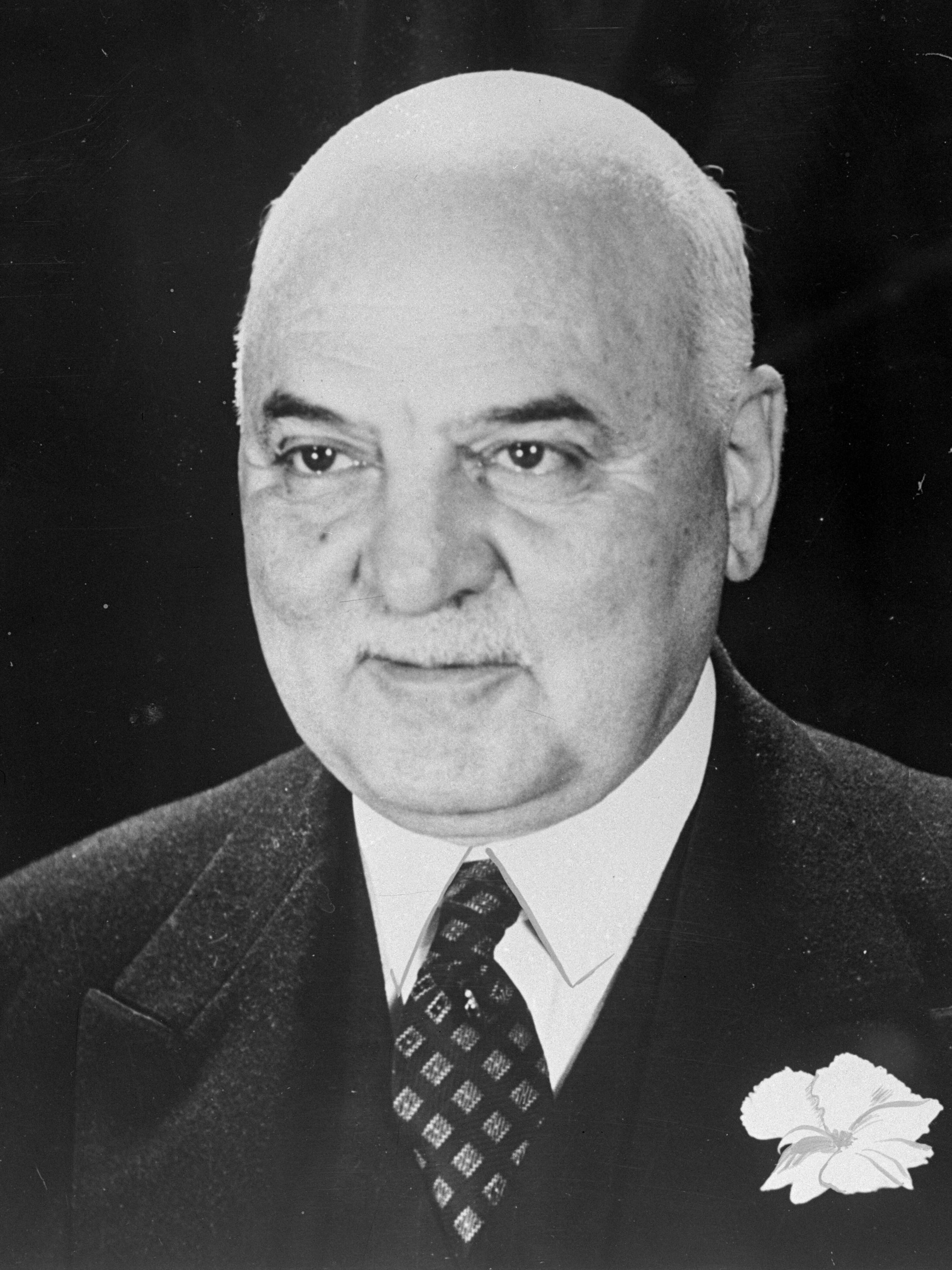

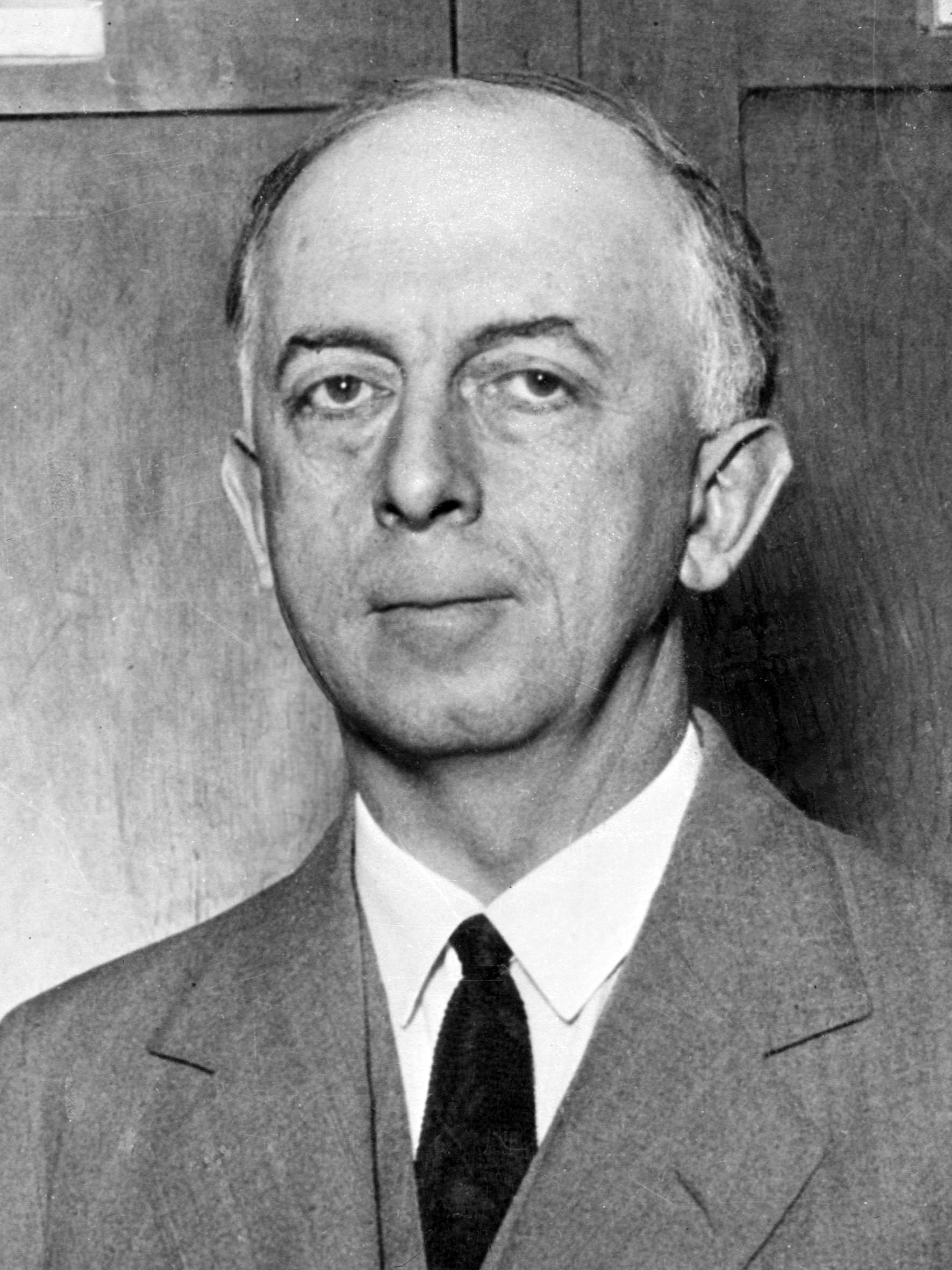

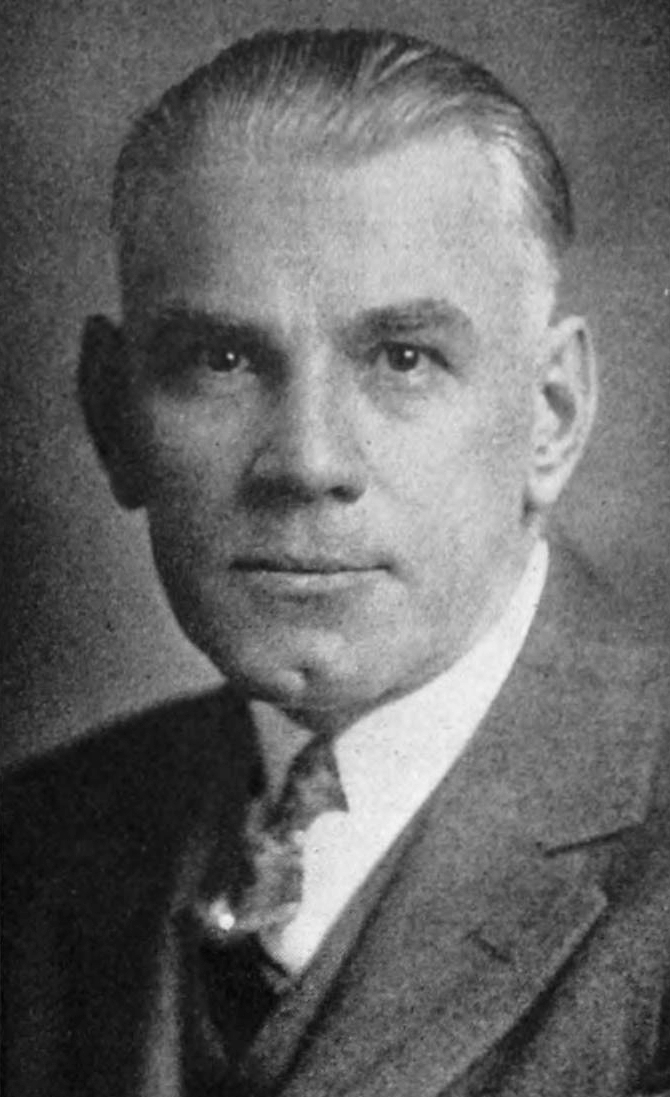
Candidate	Angelo Joseph Rossi	Franck R. Havenner	Adolph Uhl
Party	Republican	Democratic	Nonpartisan
Popular vote	137,028	116,346	16,104
Percentage	48.16%	40.89%	5.66%
Mayor before election
Angelo Joseph Rossi
Republican
Elected mayor
Angelo Joseph Rossi
Republican

The 1939 San Francisco mayoral election was held on November 7, 1939. Incumbent mayor Angelo Joseph Rossi was re-elected with 48% of the vote.

== Results ==
1939 San Francisco mayoral election
Candidate	Votes	%
Angelo Joseph Rossi	137,028	48.16%
Franck R. Havenner	116,346	40.89%
Adolph Uhl	16,104	5.66%
James B. McSheehy	6,970	2.45%
Adolph E. Schmidt	4,473	1.57%
James W. Doherty	2,250	0.79%
William W. Hurley	710	0.25%
