= Edward J. Livernash =

American politician (1866–1938)

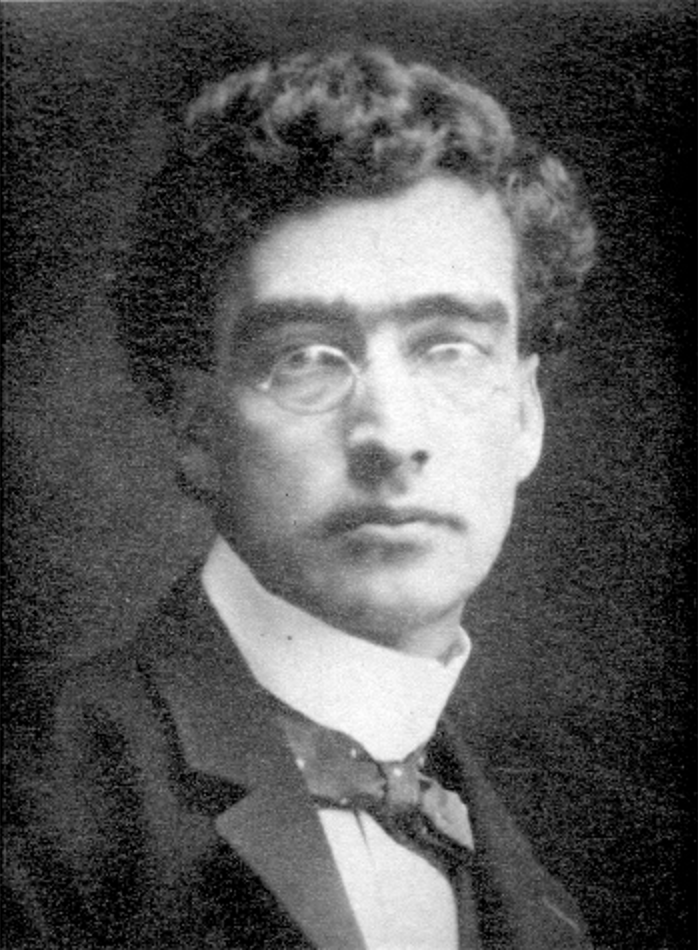
- Livernash c. 1902

Member of the U.S. House of Representatives from California's 4th district
- In office March 4, 1903 – March 3, 1905
- Preceded by: Julius Kahn
- Succeeded by: Julius Kahn

Personal details
- Born: Edward James Livernash; February 14, 1866 Lower Calaveritas, California, U.S.
- Died: June 1, 1938 (aged 72) Agnew, California, U.S.
- Resting place: Cypress Lawn Memorial Park
- Party: Democratic; Union Labor
- Spouse: Jessie Overton (m. 1891; div. 1909) Zilla Dumouriez (m. 1909)
- Children: Alberta
- Occupation: Journalist, lawyer

Edward James Livernash, subsequently Count Edward James de Nivernais (February 14, 1866 – June 1, 1938), was an American newspaperman and lawyer who served one term as a U.S. Representative representing the fourth congressional district of California from 1903 to 1905.

Late in life Livernash adopted the French form of the family name, de Nivernais, by decree of court.

== Biography ==
Livernash was born in Lower Calaveritas, a California mining camp near San Andreas, to an Irish mother and a father of French-Canadian descent, and attended the common schools of California. He became a printer at the age of fifteen, and a year later founded a Democratic newspaper at Cloverdale, California called the Pacific Sentinel. He studied law in preparation for journalism, and in 1887 was admitted to the California bar. In 1891, he joined the staff of the San Francisco Examiner and held various editorial posts there.

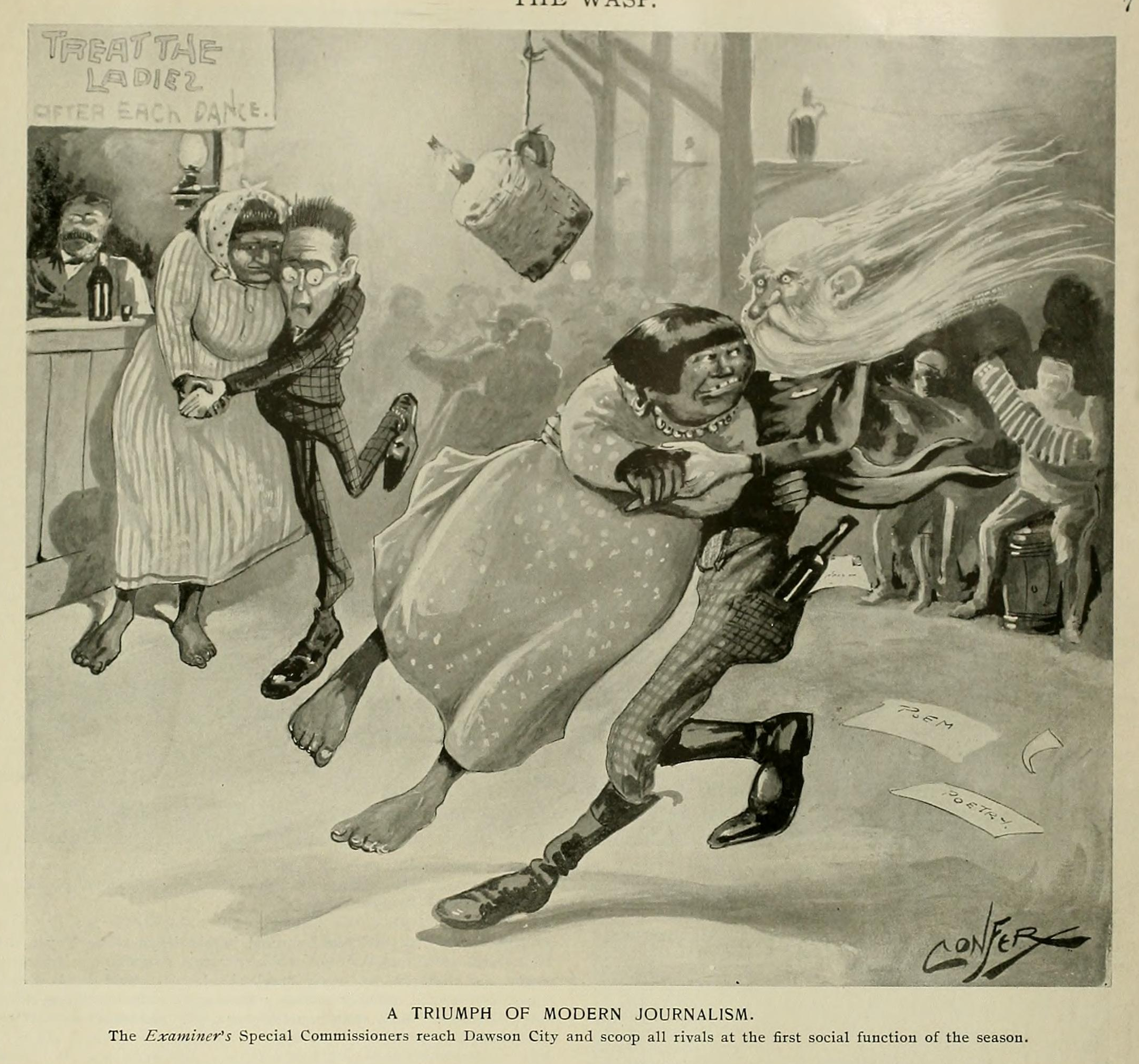
"A Triumph Of Modern Journalism," a cartoon by C. H. Confer published in The Wasp mocking Livernash and Joaquin Miller's Klondike expedition, September 25, 1897

In 1897, Livernash was sent to the Klondike region of Canada alongside poet Joaquin Miller as part of an Examiner expedition investigating the Gold Rush that had begun a year prior. Before returning, he was chosen by the miners to represent them in Ottawa and share their views regarding new laws.

On the night of February 18, 1898, Livernash's brother J. J. committed suicide by gunshot. Earlier that evening, he went to the offices of The San Francisco Call and "sold the story of his own suicide," selling an enclosed packet that he said contained a story of "public interest." The payment was to be sent to his wife, and the packet opened the next morning. By that time, he had killed himself, and The Call ran the story.

=== Attempted murder ===
On September 26, 1891, Livernash was arrested for public indecency at the San Francisco Ferry Building after a police sergeant discovered him wearing drag and blackface. When he was taken to the police station, officers discovered several toxic chemicals, including chloroform and prussic acid, in his bag. Livernash changed his story several times, but ultimately was only charged with the misdemeanor of wearing women's clothing in public, and charged a fine.

One month later, on October 29, Livernash was again arrested in Cloverdale after he shot 71-year-old Darius Ethridge four times in the face with a pair of revolvers. Ethridge survived the attack. Earlier that evening, Livernash had visited Ethridge, an acquaintance, and dropped off a bottle of poisoned wine. Ethridge did not drink it, prompting Livernash to return that night, holding Ethridge at gunpoint and demanding he rewrite his will to include Livernash. When he refused, Livernash opened fire.

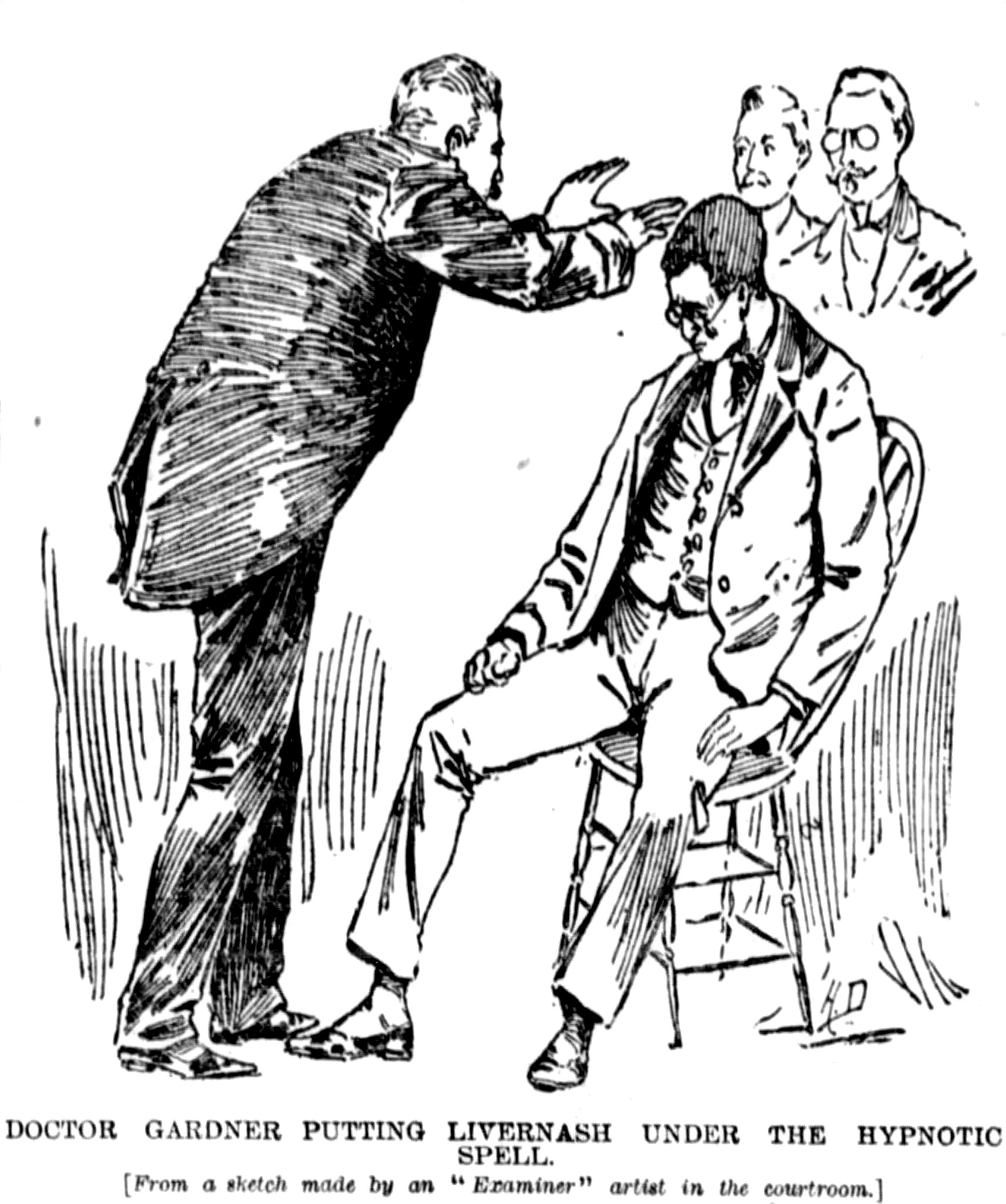
Courtroom sketch published in the San Francisco Examiner depicting Livernash being placed under hypnosis, October 29, 1892

Livernash was committed to the Napa State Hospital, where he was held in custody until the attempted-murder trial opened a year later. His defense argued that he was a somnambulist, and had not been awake when he tried to kill Ethridge. To prove this point, they hired a doctor to hypnotize Livernash so he could recount the details of the incident. Thus, he became the first person in American history to testify in court under hypnosis. After 30 hours of deliberation, the case resulted in a hung jury, and was sent back for retrial.

Five months later, the second trial began, with Livernash representing himself. He discarded the hypnosis defense and instead claimed he suffered from bouts of insanity inherited from his parents. He called several witnesses to corroborate his story, including Congressman Thomas J. Geary. After a five-hour closing argument, the jury met for just seven minutes and found him not guilty.

While Livernash's motives and the extent of his insanity remain unclear, one theory put forward suggests he was seeking to recoup an earlier loss. Two weeks before the crossdressing incident, the office of the Livermore Herald (a newspaper Livernash had recently acquired) burned down. The property was uninsured, and one paper estimated the cost to Livernash would be over $5,000. Thus, his acquaintance Darius Ethridge, an elderly bachelor of substantial wealth, would have been a logical target.

=== Political career ===
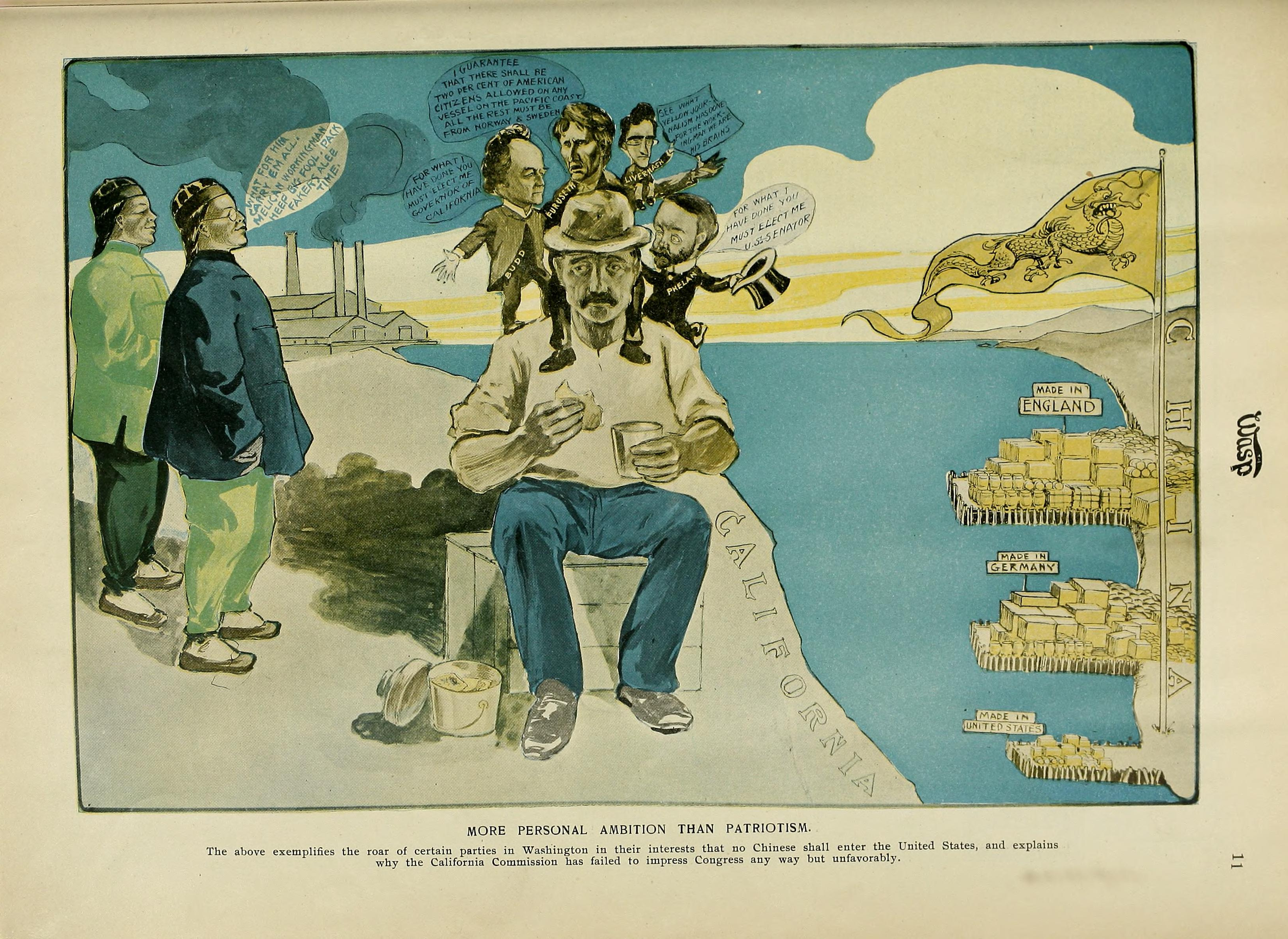
"More Personal Ambition Than Patriotism," a political cartoon published in The Wasp mocking the promotion of Chinese exclusion by Livernash, James Budd, Andrew Furuseth and James D. Phelan, February 22, 1902

in 1904, Livernash ran for Congress to represent California's 4th congressional district (San Francisco) in the Fifty-eighth Congress (March 4, 1903 – March 3, 1905) on a Democratic and Union Labor ticket. The dual nomination was unusual, and under then-prevailing California law, Livernash was required to choose which nomination would appear on the ballot; however, in October 1902 the California Supreme Court held that the provision limiting the ballot entry to a single nomination was not valid, and allowed both designations to appear.

Livernash's opponents in the election were the incumbent, Republican Julius Kahn; Socialist Party candidate William Costley; and Prohibition Party candidate Joseph Rowell. Livernash received 16,146 (49.17%) of the votes cast, compared to 16,005 (48.74%) cast for Kahn, with Costly and Rowell picking up the remaining 2.09%. Kahn contested the election, charging that many of the votes in Livernash's plurality were illegally cast, but the election was upheld.

Livernash served only one term, losing his reelection bid to Kahn in 1904.

=== Later career and death ===
He became the managing editor of the Rocky Mountain News in 1906, but resigned after only thirteen weeks after coming under criticism from Senator Thomas M. Patterson for an editorial published in December 1906. He returned to San Francisco the following January to join the staff of The Bulletin.

Livernash resided in France from 1909 to 1912, when he returned to the United States and settled near Belmont, California. He engaged in study and literary pursuits.

Livernash died in Agnew, California on June 1, 1938. His remains were cremated at Cypress Lawn Cemetery in Colma, California.

== Electoral history ==
1902 United States House of Representatives elections
Party	Candidate	Votes	%
Democratic	Edward J. Livernash	16,146	49.2
Republican	Julius Kahn (Incumbent)	16,005	48.7
Socialist	William Costley	616	1.9
Prohibition	Joseph Rowell	69	0.2
Total votes		16,836	100.0
Turnout			
Democratic gain from Republican			

1904 United States House of Representatives elections
Party	Candidate	Votes	%
Republican	Julius Kahn	20,012	57.0
Democratic	Edward J. Livernash (Incumbent)	12,812	36.4
Socialist	William Costley	2,267	6.4
Total votes		35,091	100.0
Turnout			
Republican gain from Democratic			

U.S. House of Representatives
Preceded by Julius Kahn	Member of the U.S. House of Representatives from California's 4th congressional district 1903–1905	Succeeded by Julius Kahn
