= Lapham's Quarterly =

American literary magazine

- The Spring 2008 Cover, "About Money."
- Categories: History, criticism, art, literature, culture
- Frequency: Quarterly
- Circulation: 40,000 (as of 2014)
- Founder: Lewis H. Lapham
- Founded: 2007
- Company: American Agora Foundation
- Country: United States
- Based in: New York City
- Website: www.laphamsquarterly.org
- ISSN: 1935-7494

Lapham's Quarterly is a literary magazine established in 2007 by former Harper's Magazine editor Lewis H. Lapham. Each issue examines a theme using primary source material from history. The inaugural issue "States of War" contained dozens of essays, speeches, and excerpts from historical authors ranging from Thucydides, William Shakespeare, and Sun Tzu to Mark Twain, among others. Recent issue themes included "Foreigners", "Time", and "Youth". Each issue includes an introductory essay by Lapham (or a member of the magazine's editorial board), readings from historical contributors, and essays by contemporary writers and historians.

Lapham's Quarterly was placed on an indefinite hiatus on November 3, 2023, citing "a combination of financial challenges". The most recent issue, titled "Energy", was released digitally. Lapham died a year later and magazine was acquired at no cost in March 2025 by Bard College from the American Agora Foundation. Its website and podcast relaunched that summer, with the print magazine planned for the following year.

== Organization ==
Lapham's Quarterly is published by the American Agora Foundation, a not-for-profit foundation dedicated to fostering interest in history. The offices are located in New York City. As of 2014, the magazine had a staff of 17 and a circulation of 40,000.

== Online ==
Since 2010 the magazine has produced a podcast featuring interviews and discussion related to topics from recent issues.
