= Margaret Mary Morgan =

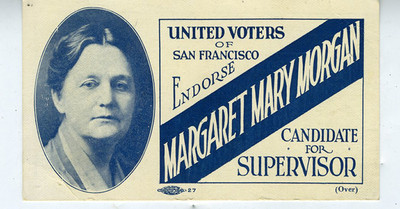
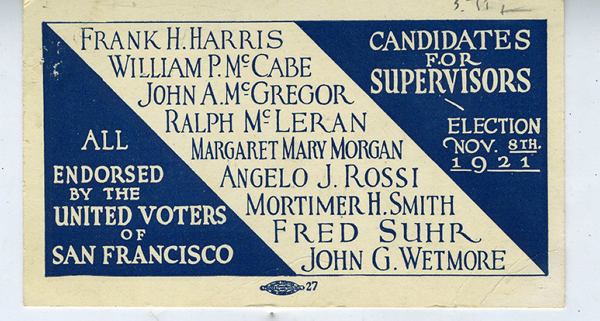
Margaret Mary Morgan political campaign card of 1921, also showing other candidate slate members, including later mayor Angelo Joseph Rossi, plus Frank H. Harris, John A. McGregor, Ralph McLeran, Mortimer H. Smith, Fred Suhr and John G. Wetmore.

Margaret Mary Morgan (May 1, 1866 – May 27, 1946) was a U.S. suffragist, printing business owner, politician, child welfare advocate and, in 1921, the first woman ever elected to the San Francisco Board of Supervisors.

Originally of Portland, Maine, she first obtained work with her sister in a children’s clothing store at Monument Square in Portland. After moving to San Francisco in 1903 she obtained a position with the Walter N. Brunt Printing Company in its collections office where she was paid six dollars a week, later being promoted to the company's office manager. She then started her own business, The Margaret Mary Morgan Printing Company, at 619 California Street.

In 1918 the national board of the Young Women’s Christian Association asked her to look into the welfare of women and children in China. She became the first woman ever elected to the Board of Supervisors, San Francisco's governing body, in 1921 and served until 1925. Morgan was additionally involved with the California Federation of Business & Professional Women’s Clubs; the San Francisco Business & Professional Women’s Club as its president; the California League of Women Voters as its treasurer; and the San Francisco Nursery for Homeless Children as one of its trustees.

Upon leaving her seat as a city supervisor, she was quoted as saying, "Remember, a woman has to work harder than a man and have more patience in order to achieve success." She died in San Francisco, California.
