= Lewis H. Lapham =

American writer (1935–2024)

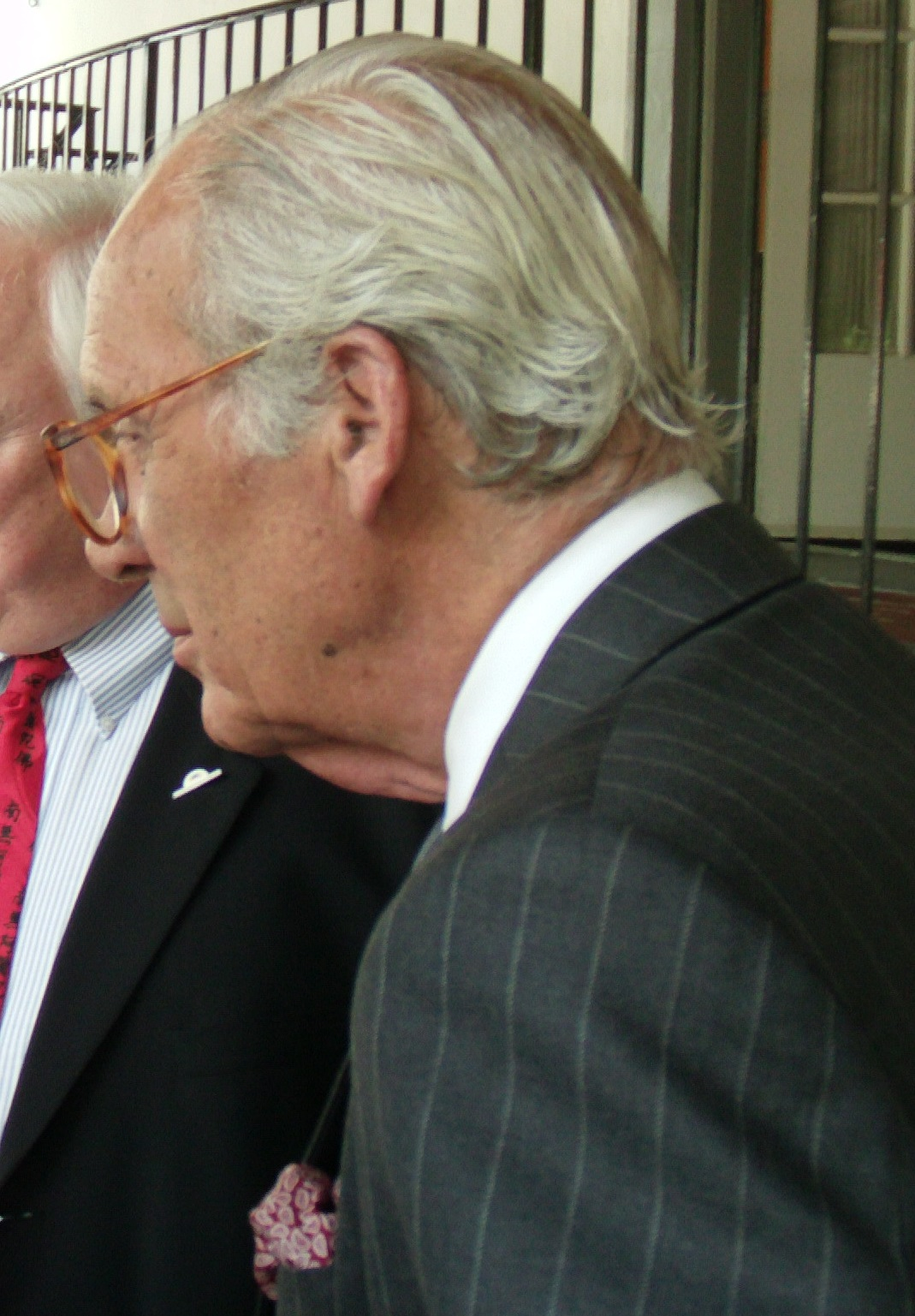
- Lapham in 2010
- Born: Lewis Henry Lapham; January 8, 1935; San Francisco, California, U.S.
- Died: July 23, 2024 (aged 89); Rome, Italy
- Education: Yale University; Magdalene College, Cambridge
- Occupation: Writer
- Known for: Editor of Harper's Magazine and founder of Lapham's Quarterly
- Spouse: Joan Brooke Reeves (m. 1972)
- Children: 3
- Father: Lewis A. Lapham
- Relatives: Caroline Mulroney (daughter-in-law); Christopher Lloyd (first cousin once removed)

Lewis Henry Lapham II (/ˈlæpəm/; January 8, 1935 – July 23, 2024) was an American writer. He was the editor of the American monthly Harper's Magazine from 1976 until 1981, and from 1983 until 2006. He was the founder of Lapham's Quarterly, a publication about history and literature, and wrote numerous books on politics and current affairs.

== Early life and education ==
A son of Lewis A. Lapham and Jane Foster, Lapham was born January 8, 1935, in San Francisco. He was raised in San Francisco and his father was president of the Grace Line and Bankers Trust. His grandfather Roger Lapham had been mayor of San Francisco in the 1940s, and his great-grandfather, Lewis Henry Lapham, was a founder of Texaco. Through his grandfather, Lapham was the son of the first cousin of actor Christopher Lloyd, although Lapham was three years older. As a boy, he attended the Hotchkiss School, graduating in 1952.

Lapham was educated at Magdalene College, Cambridge and Yale University, where he was a member of St. Anthony Hall.

== Harper's Magazine ==
Lapham served as editor of Harper's Magazine from 1976 to 2006 (with a hiatus from 1981 to 1983). He was managing editor from 1971 to 1975, after having worked for the San Francisco Examiner and the New York Herald Tribune. He was largely responsible for the modern look and prominence of the magazine, having introduced many of its signature features, including the "Harper's Index". He announced that he would become editor emeritus in 2006, continuing to write his Notebook column for the magazine as well as editing a new journal about history, Lapham's Quarterly. Lapham also worked with the PEN American Center, sitting on the board of judges for the PEN/Newman's Own First Amendment Award. In 2007, he was inducted into the American Society of Magazine Editors' Hall of Fame.

Lapham wrote a September 2004 column for Harper's in which he included a brief account of the Republican National Convention as if he had witnessed it. However, the magazine arrived in subscribers' mailboxes before the convention took place, "forcing Lapham to admit that the scene was a fiction". The columnist apologized, "but pointed out political conventions are drearily scripted anyway – he basically knew what was going to be said".

== Lapham's Quarterly ==
Lapham retired from Harper's in 2006. That year, he founded Lapham's Quarterly, a publication about history and literature. Each issue is devoted to one subject and featured pieces by ancient writers to contemporary celebrities.

== Works ==
External videos
- Booknotes interview with Lapham on The Wish for Kings, August 15, 1993, C-SPAN
- Presentation by Lapham on The Wish for Kings, July 27, 1993, C-SPAN
- Presentation by Lapham on New American Ruling Class, January 25, 1996, C-SPAN
- Presentation by Lapham on An American Album: 150 Years of Harper's Magazine, May 25, 2000, C-SPAN
- Presentation by Lapham on Theater of War, October 3, 2002, C-SPAN
- Presentation by Lapham on Age of Folly, November 3, 2016, C-SPAN

After spending a year studying history at the University of Cambridge, Lapham wrote for the San Francisco Examiner, the New York Herald Tribune, The Saturday Evening Post, and Life. He also contributed to Commentary, Fortune, Forbes, Vanity Fair, among other publications. Lapham served as a judge for the PEN/Newman's Own First Amendment Award.

Lapham was the host and author of the PBS series America's Century and he was host of the weekly PBS series, Bookmark from 1989 to 1991.

Lapham was until his death the host of The World in Time: radio discussions with scholars and historians on Bloomberg Radio that open the doors of history behind the events in the news. Podcasts of the weekly talks are available at Bloomberg.com.

Lapham wrote The American Ruling Class (2005), a movie done in documentary style and featuring fictional characters and real people, i.e. Bill Bradley, Hodding Carter III, and Barbara Ehrenreich, author of Nickel and Dimed, pondering the question "Is there a ruling class in America?", Lapham states at the movie's conclusion that "if you're not in, you're out". The movie aired on the Sundance Channel on July 30, 2007.

== Awards and honors ==
In 1978, Lapham received the Gerald Loeb Award for Magazines. In 2016, he received the insignia of Chevalier of the Order of Arts and Letters.

In 2025, Harper's Magazine created the Lewis H. Lapham Award for Literary Excellence, a literary award named in his honor. The inaugural award was given to Marilynne Robinson.

== Personal life ==
In 1972, Lapham married Joan Brooke Reeves, the daughter of Edward J. Reeves, a stockbroker and grocery heir, and Elizabeth M. Brooke (formerly the wife of Thomas Wilton Phipps, a nephew of Nancy Astor, Viscountess Astor). They had three children:

- Delphina (married Prince Don Bante Maria Boncompagni-Ludovisi)
- Andrew (married Caroline Mulroney, only daughter of former Canadian Prime Minister Brian Mulroney)
- Winston

Lapham, previously living on the Upper East Side of Manhattan, moved to Rome at the start of 2024. He died there on July 23, 2024, at the age of 89.

== Bibliography ==
=== Books ===
- Lapham, Lewis H. (1980). Fortune's child. Doubleday.
- — (1988). Money and class in America. Weidenfeld & Nicolson.
- — (1990). Imperial masquerade. Grove Weidenfeld.
- — (1993). The wish for kings : democracy at bay. Grove Press.
- — (1995). Hotel America. Verso.
- — (1997). Waiting for the barbarians. Verso.
- — (1999). Lapham's rules of influence. Random House.
- — (1999). The agony of Mammon. Verso.
- — (2001). Lights, camera, democracy!. Random House Publishing.
- — (2003). Theater of war. New Press.
- — (2003). 30 satires. New Press.
- — (2004). Gag rule. Penguin.
- — (2005). With the Beatles. Melville House Publishing.
- — (2006). Pretensions to empire : notes on the criminal folly of the Bush Administration. The New Press.
- — (2016). Age of folly : America abandons its democracy. Verso.

=== Essays and reporting ===
- Lapham, Lewis H. (November 1994). "Gospel singing". Notebook. Harper's Magazine. 289 (1734): 8–9.
- — (January 2009). "By the rivers of Babylon". Notebook. Harper's Magazine. 318 (1904): 7–9.
