= Lewis A. Lapham =

American businessman

- Lewis A. Lapham (left) and Roger Lapham golfing in 1930
- Born: March 7, 1909; New York City, New York, U.S.
- Died: December 20, 1995 (aged 86)
- Occupations: Shipping; Banking executive
- Spouse: Jane Foster
- Parent(s): Roger D. Lapham; Helen B. Abbott

Lewis Abbot Lapham (March 7, 1909 – December 20, 1995) was an American shipping and banking executive.

== Life and career ==
Lapham was born in New York City, the son of Helen B. (née Abbott) and shipping executive and future Mayor of San Francisco Roger D. Lapham, and the grandson of entrepreneur Lewis Henry Lapham. Lapham attended the Hotchkiss School and went on to Yale University, graduating in 1931. At Yale, he was a member of Skull and Bones.

Roger Lapham was a founder of the Cypress Point Club golf course. In 1929, father (Roger) and son (Lewis) played a foursome there with Bobby Jones and Francis Ouimet. This attracted a large crowd and frayed the nerves of the 20-year-old Lewis. After one successful shot by Lewis, Bobby Jones loudly asked which golf club Lewis had used. Bobby Jones continued to solicit Lewis's advice in front of the crowd until the younger Lapham's confidence was restored.

Lapham worked as a journalist, columnist, and editor for the San Francisco Examiner for six years. In World War II, he was civilian executive assistant to the general in command of the San Francisco Port of Embarkation. From 1945 to 1946 he was president of the Pacific American Steamship Association.

Lewis Henry Lapham was a founding investor of the American-Hawaiian Steamship Company in 1899 and Roger Lapham served as its president until he stepped down in 1944 to run for Mayor. Lewis Lapham became its last president in 1947. Miscalculating future shipping rates, the company bought six new ships, but soon losses forced them to suspend shipping in 1953. Billionaire Daniel Ludwig was brought in as an investor and Lapham resigned and his family sold their holdings to Ludwig, who gained control of the company and eventually liquidated it.

Lapham became executive vice president of the Grace Line and in 1955 became its president. He realized that J. Peter Grace was determined to get W. R. Grace and Company out of the shipping industry (Grace sold the Grace Line in 1969), so he left the company and the shipping business in 1959. He joined Bankers Trust Company and served in a variety of executive and board positions until 1981.

Lapham was married to Jane Foster for 63 years. They had two sons, Lewis H. Lapham, long-time editor of Harper's Magazine, and Anthony A. Lapham (born Anthony Abbot Lapham; San Francisco, 22 August 1936 - 11 November 2006), a lawyer for and general counsel of the Central Intelligence Agency, married with two children.
