= Angelo Joseph Rossi =

31st Mayor of San Francisco from 1931 to 1944

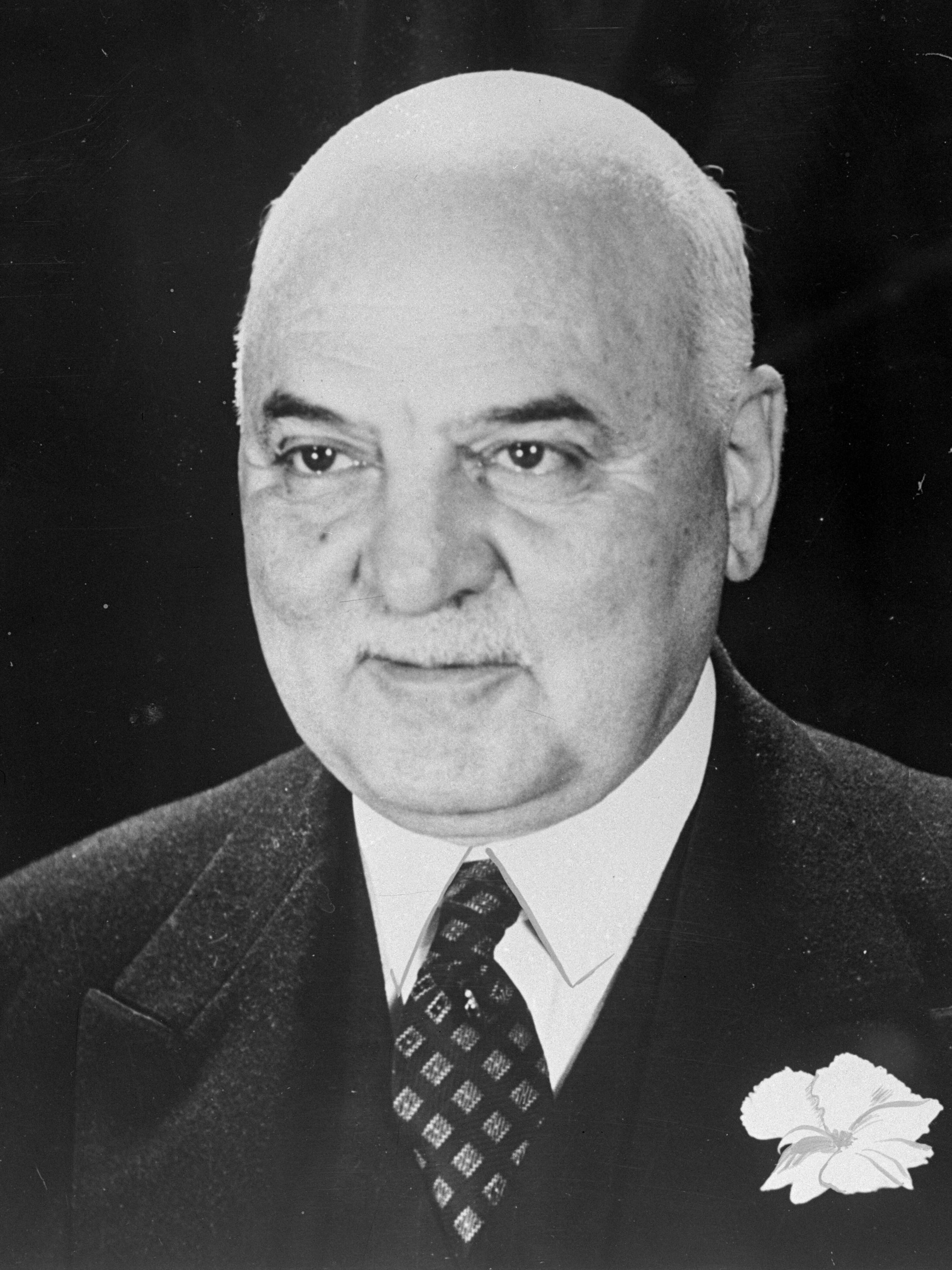
- Rossi in 1939

31st Mayor of San Francisco
- In office January 7, 1931 – January 8, 1944
- Preceded by: James Rolph
- Succeeded by: Roger Lapham

Personal details
- Born: January 22, 1878 Volcano, California, U.S.
- Died: April 5, 1948 (aged 70) San Francisco, California, U.S.
- Party: Republican
- Spouse: Grace Mabel Allen
- Children: Eleanor Rossi Crabtree; Clarence Rossi; Rosamond Rossi Cleese
- Profession: Florist

Angelo Joseph Rossi (January 22, 1878 – April 5, 1948) was a U.S. political figure who served as the 31st Mayor of San Francisco from 1931 to 1944. A member of the Republican Party, he was mayor during most of both the Great Depression and World War II.

== Life and career ==
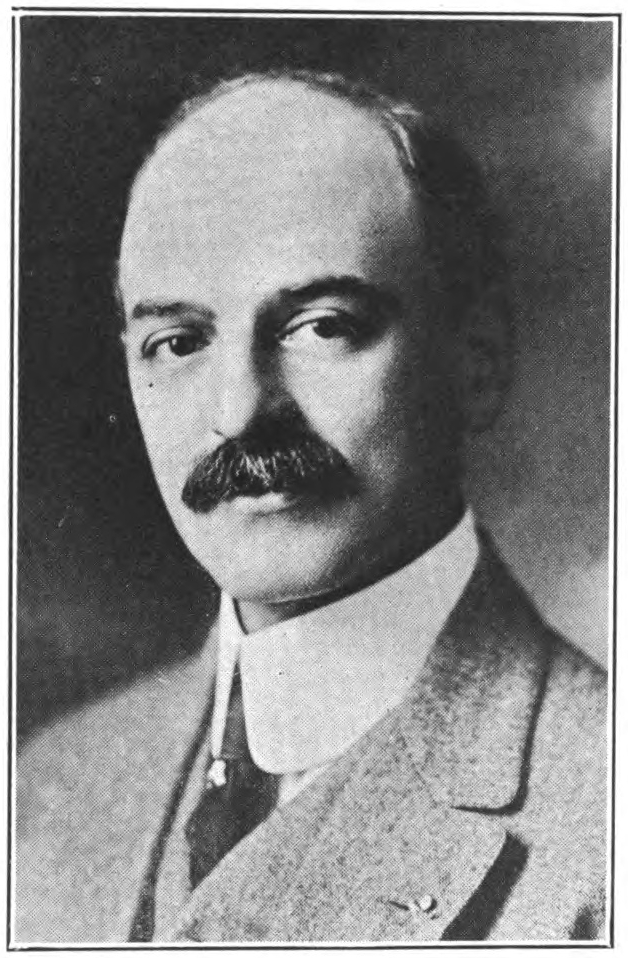
Rossi as San Francisco playground commissioner, 1915

Rossi was born in Volcano, Amador County, California, and came to San Francisco in 1890 with his widowed mother and six siblings after the family home and general store burned to the ground in minutes. (Rossi's father, also named Angelo, left Italy in 1849 at age 16 aboard a ship loaded with marble that departed from Genoa. When he arrived in Amador County, he mined for gold and opened his general store.)

When young Angelo arrived in San Francisco with his family, he attended school but left after sixth grade to work in jobs ranging from cash boy to clerk in a couple of different florist shops, including Carbone and Sons and Pelicano and Sons, which became Pelicano and Rossi when he became a partner in the early 1900s. Eventually he opened his own company, Angelo J. Rossi, Inc.; during his tenure in office the business continued to operate in an Art Deco building Rossi owned at 45 Grant Avenue.

When James Rolph resigned as mayor in January 1931 to become governor of California, Rossi was elected by his fellow members of the Board of Supervisors as Rolph's successor. (Rossi had served on the Board from 1922 to 1926 and had just returned in 1930.) After completing the remaining year of Rolph's term, Rossi was elected in his own right as mayor in November 1931. He was re-elected mayor for second and third full terms in 1935 and 1939.

During Rossi's tenure, the Golden Gate Bridge and the San Francisco–Oakland Bay Bridge were opened, and he presided over the building of Treasure Island and the Golden Gate International Exposition (World's Fair) of 1939–40. Under his administration, the city resisted compliance with the Raker Act, which required San Francisco to sell power from the Hetch Hetchy Reservoir in Yosemite to municipalities or municipal water districts, and not to any corporations, a condition of use of the Hetch Hetchy Valley. Rossi dedicated the Mount Davidson Cross in March, 1934. He was a strong proponent of the New Deal alphabet-soup roster of work programs and worked vigorously and constantly with Washington to bring as many dollars to the city as possible in order to create jobs and improve the city's infrastructure. Rossi presided over groundbreaking ceremonies for San Francisco City College in April 1937. He befriended and hosted Fiorello La Guardia in San Francisco and visited New York City as La Guardia's guest.

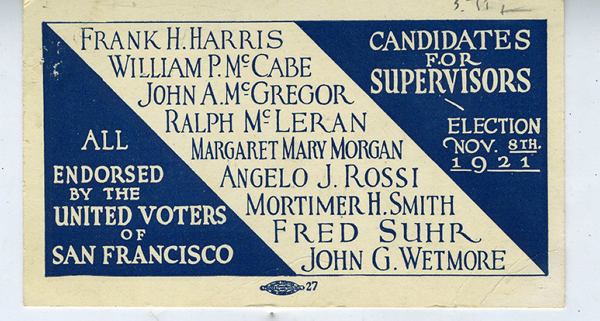
Political campaign card of 1921 showing Board of Supervisor candidates, including Angelo J. Rossi

Rossi was adamantly anti-Communist, and labeled the more militant labor organizing and strikes as the work of agitators. During the July 1934 general strike, Rossi organized a committee to thwart the strike and move freight; he called on Governor Frank Merriam to send the National Guard to quell the strike, but argued successfully against the governor's wish to declare martial law. Two strikers were killed by bullets, and eighty-five were hospitalized.

On July 19, 1934, Mayor Rossi spoke on national radio, "I congratulate the real leaders of organized labor on their decision and the part they have played in ending the general strike. San Francisco has stamped out without bargain or compromise an attempt to import into its life the very real danger of revolt... We will deal effectively with the small group who opposed peace and plotted revolution."

When his police force raided political offices and worker organizations after the strike, Rossi issued a statement: "I pledge to you that as Chief Executive in San Francisco I will, to the full extent of my authority, run out of San Francisco every Communist agitator, and this is going to be a continuing policy in San Francisco." During a period of publicized police scandal, he asked for and appropriated $70,000 to investigate corruption in the department. The district attorney, Matthew Brady, hired Edwin Atherton, a private investigator, who published the Atherton Report on police corruption in 1937.

In an extended strike in the late 1930s, Rossi lashed out at Harry Bridges, West Coast C.I.O. leader, saying the city is "sick of the alien" in a telegram to President Franklin D. Roosevelt, asking for federal intervention. In May 1942, six months after the bombing of Pearl Harbor, at the Tenney Committee hearings held in San Francisco, Rossi was subpoenaed, having been accused of supporting Italian fascism. According to The New York Times of May 26, 1942, "With tears in his eyes and a voice that broke with emotion, Mayor Angelo J. Rossi protested today his '100 per cent' loyalty to America and told a committee of the California Assembly that his presence before it as a witness was 'based on the damnable lies of irresponsible people'." He had been accused of making fascist salutes at San Francisco Columbus Day celebrations, which he strongly denied. Rossi testified that he removed a picture of Benito Mussolini from his office before the war began. Rossi had previously associated with Nazis. On October 3, 1938, he gave a speech at the California Hall, where 2,500 members of the pro-Nazi United German Societies were observing the annual German Day. The meeting was protested by a rally of 150 anti-fascists. Also attending the rally was Baron Manfred Freiherr von Killinger.

Running for a fourth term as mayor in 1943, in a rancorous campaign, Rossi was defeated when a protégé of his, George Reilly, ran against him, splitting the Catholic vote, and when Roger Lapham was tapped by business interests to run, in part to advance their cause regarding the city's purchase of the Market Street Railway.

== Legacy ==
He died in 1948 and is buried in Holy Cross Cemetery, in Colma, California. A city park (Rossi Park), playground (Rossi Playground), pool (Rossi Pool) and a street (Rossi Avenue) in the Richmond district of San Francisco are named after him.

== See also ==
- Margaret Mary Morgan
- Edwin Atherton
- Pete McDonough
- William J. Quinn

== Bibliography ==
- Ward, Estolvo, "The Gentle Dynamiter - 1983 Ramparts Press LC# 382-80645 ISBN 0-87867-089-0
- Treasure Island World's Fair - 1939 at www.sfmuseum.net
- San Francisco General Strike – Request for More Troops – 1934 at www.sfmuseum.org
- Labor Day Speech Monday, September 4, 1939

Preceded by James Rolph, Jr.	Mayor of San Francisco; 1931–1944	Succeeded by Roger Lapham
