= Roger Lapham =

American businessman and 32nd Mayor of San Francisco

Roger D. Lapham
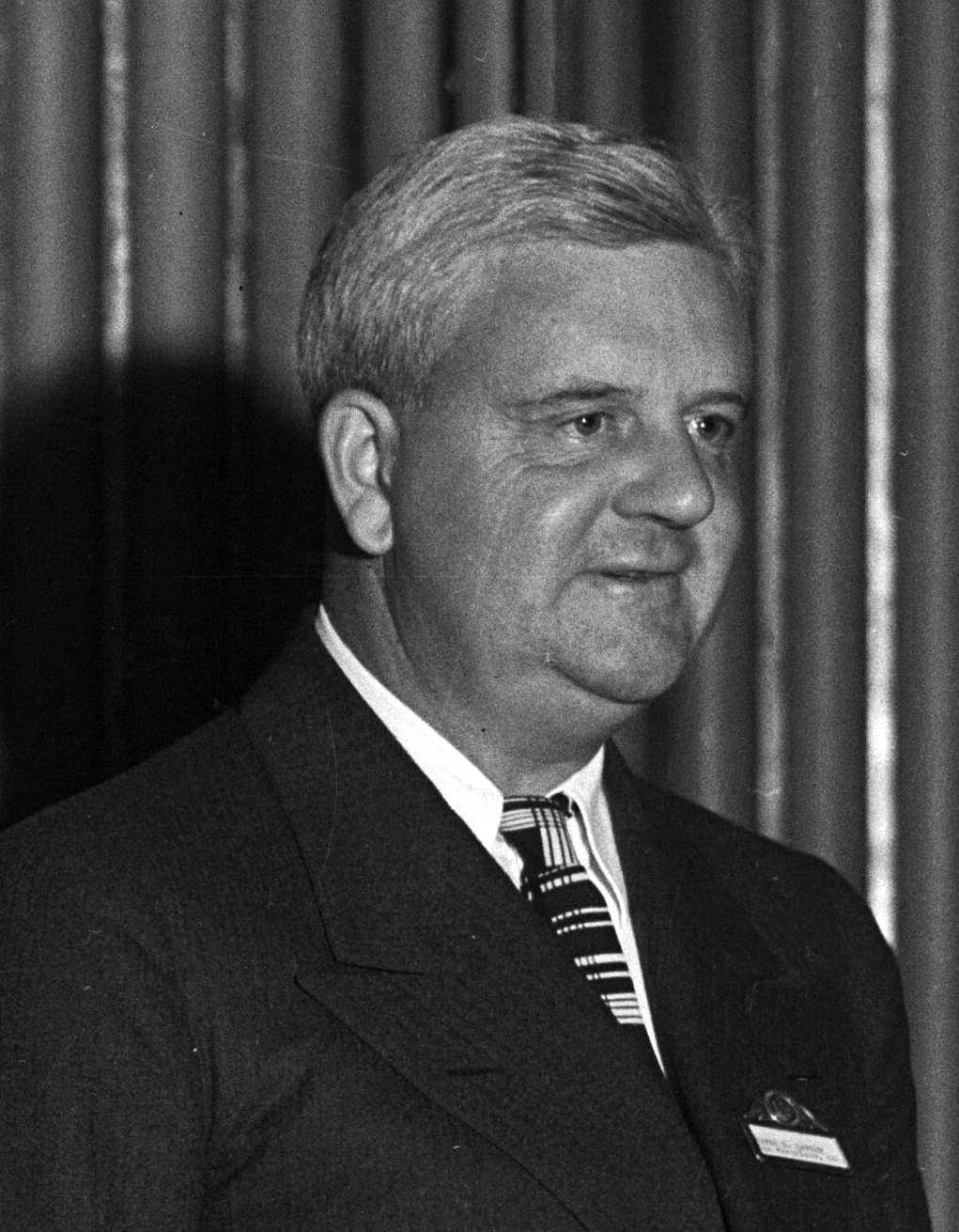
- Lapham in 1934

32nd Mayor of San Francisco
- In office January 8, 1944 – January 8, 1948
- Preceded by: Angelo Rossi
- Succeeded by: Elmer Robinson

Personal details
- Born: Roger Dearborn Lapham; December 6, 1883 New York City, New York, U.S.
- Died: April 16, 1966 (aged 82) San Francisco, California, U.S.
- Party: Republican
- Spouse: Helen B. Abbott
- Children: Lewis A. Lapham; Roger D. Lapham Jr. Carol Lapham Valentine; Edna Lapham Van Oosten
- Parent(s): Lewis Henry Lapham; Antoinette N. Dearborn

Roger Dearborn Lapham (December 6, 1883 – April 16, 1966) was a shipowner and businessman who served as the 32nd mayor of San Francisco from 1944 to 1948.

== Life and career ==
Lapham was born in New York City in 1883, the son of Antoinette N. (née Dearborn) and businessman Lewis Henry Lapham. He was educated at Harvard, and a member of the Pacific Union Club.

In the summer of 1918, Lapham was a captain of infantry with the American Expeditionary Force in World War I.

In 1925, he was president of the American-Hawaiian Steamship Company.

In 1927, Lapham was a founder of the Cypress Point golf course on the Monterey Peninsula.

Lapham championed the employers' position in the 1936 waterfront strike and was elevated as a "business" mayor by a member of the Police Commission, J. Ward Maillard, after collapse of the Angelo Rossi constituency. Upon taking office as mayor, Lapham declared his intention to serve only one term. According to Radebaugh, Lapham was "so convinced of the employers' cause that he took on Harry Bridges, leader of the striking (C.I.O.) Congress of Industrial Organizations longshoremen, in public debate."

During World War II, Lapham was the industry representative on the National War Labor Board, but resigned to run for mayor of San Francisco.

Lapham presided over the formation of one of San Francisco's perennial Charter Review Commissions and the consolidation of the private street railway systems into municipal ownership. Though the private franchises were set to expire in a few years, Lapham drove a horsecar up Market Street to launch a campaign for a charter amendment to purchase the private streetcar lines. Lapham was blamed for his plan of reducing the principal by spending the increased streetcar incomes during the war years and neglecting upkeep and maintenance of the rolling stock.

In 1945 Lapham stood firm in the face of a strike threat by a group of city employees protesting the hiring of a Nisei man named Takeo Miyama who had been interned at the Tule Lake Relocation Center.

Lapham was subject to the first recall attempt in city history due to his increasing of streetcar fares in July 1946. Lapham himself signed the recall petition and urged others to sign it to bring the issue to a vote. The recall was fought by all four daily newspapers and failed by 32,000 votes at a special election. In 1947 he attempted to scrap the city's cable car system, claiming it was too expensive. This idea was abandoned in the face of protests, led by Friedel Klussmann, and the city retains the cable cars to this day. Lapham also presided over the founding of the United Nations at the first meeting of the United Nations Conference on International Organization, in April 1945. The meetings were held at the War Memorial Opera House.

Lapham encouraged the formation of the Council for Civic Unity and he appointed the first Asian to the Recreation Commission and the first African American to the Housing Authority. After leaving the mayor's office, he acted as chief of the post-war Economic Cooperation Administration for China, and later Greece.

== Personal life and death ==
On October 30, 1907, Lapham married Helen B. Abbott in Brooklyn, New York.

Lapham was the father of shipping and banking executive Lewis A. Lapham (1909-1995) and Roger D. Lapham Jr. (1918-2000), the paternal grandfather of Harper's Magazine editor Lewis H. Lapham, and the maternal uncle of actor Christopher Lloyd. He also had two daughters, Carol Lapham Valentine (1910-2009) and Edna Lapham Van Oosten (1912-1987).

He was a descendant of John Lapham (1677-1734) and his wife Mary Russell Lapham (1683-1752). His cousins through the Lapham family include Elbridge G. Lapham, a congressman and senator from New York; Nathan Lapham, a New York State Senator; and Susan B. Anthony, women's rights activist and suffragist.

Lapham died in 1966 after a fall in his San Francisco home, at the age of 82.

| Preceded by Angelo Rossi | Mayor of San Francisco; 1944–1948 | Succeeded by Elmer Robinson |
