= Lewis Henry Lapham =

American businessman and entrepreneur (1858–1934)

- Born: March 13, 1858; Brooklyn, New York, U.S.
- Died: June 10, 1934 (aged 76)
- Occupations: Businessman; entrepreneur
- Spouse: Antoinette N. Dearborn
- Children: Roger Dearborn Lapham; Ruth Lapham
- Parent(s): Henry Griffith Lapham; Samantha Vail
- Relatives: Lewis A. Lapham (grandson); Christopher Lloyd (grandson); Lewis H. Lapham (great-grandson); Sam Lloyd (great-grandson)

Lewis Henry Lapham (March 13, 1858 – June 10, 1934) was an American businessman and entrepreneur who made a fortune consolidating smaller business in the leather industry. He was also one of the co-founders of the oil brand Texaco, Inc. (The Texas Company) then Texaco Oil Company.

== Biography ==
Lapham was born in Brooklyn, New York, the son of Samantha Lapham (née Vail) and Henry Griffith Lapham, who were second cousins. The Laphams built their fortune as leather merchants, strategically consolidating smaller tanning businesses into larger enterprises, including the United States Leather Co.

He built Waveny House in New Canaan, Connecticut, as a summer residence for his family to escape the heat of New York City. The mansion and property are now a public park and arts centre in New Canaan.

Lapham was the husband of Antoinette N. Lapham (née Dearborn), the father of San Francisco mayor Roger D. Lapham (1883–1966), and Ruth Lloyd (née Lapham; 1896 – Darien, Connecticut, 8 October 1984), a singer and mother of seven children from her marriage including Samuel Lloyd, who died in 2017, the grandfather of actor Christopher Lloyd and banking executive Lewis A. Lapham (1909–1995), and the great-grandfather of both Lewis H. Lapham (1935-2024) and Sam Lloyd (1963–2020).

Lapham's children included Roger D. Lapham, who was noted for his investments in shipping.
