= Abbie Norton Jamison =

American composer

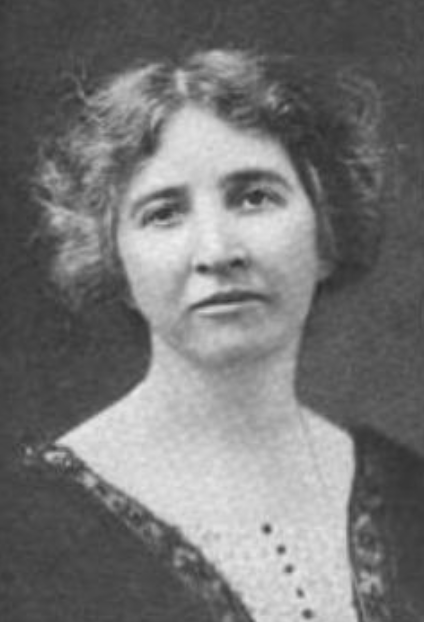
- Abbie Norton Jamison, from a 1915 publication
- Born: May 18, 1869; Cooper, Michigan
- Died: August 8, 1955 (aged 86); Los Angeles, California
- Occupations: Composer, clubwoman

Abbie Norton Jamison (May 18, 1869 – August 8, 1955) was an American pianist, composer and clubwoman, based in Los Angeles. She was first vice-president of the National Federation of Music Clubs in 1915, president of the California Music Teachers Association, and president of the California Federation of Music Clubs.

== Early life and education ==
Abbie (or Abby) Bennett Norton was born in Cooper, Michigan. She trained as a pianist, singer, and composer in the United States. Her composition teachers included Frederick Stevenson and Rudolf Friml.

== Career ==
=== Music ===
Jamison taught piano, voice, music theory, and musicianship in Los Angeles, and wrote music for songs, with titles including "The Rose and the Moth," "Little Pigeon Lullaby", "Mammy's Lullaby" (1904, words by Maria Howard Weeden), "The First Blue Bird", "The Rose and the Moth", "Awakening", "My Prayer" (set to a poem by Rabindranath Tagore), "When Love is Done", "Thy Little One", "Fate", "Spirit of the Desert", "Desert Love Song", "Our Flag", "Show Me the Way", and "California is Calling to You". She was involved with the Federal Music Project, a New Deal program, in Los Angeles. She hosted informal musical events with fellow composer and clubwoman Bessie Bartlett Frankel, and directed several women's choruses, including the La Gitana Chorus in the 1930s and 1940s.

=== Clubwork ===
Jamison was elected first vice-president of the National Federation of Music Clubs in 1915, and was president of the California Music Teachers Association from 1918 to 1920. She helped found the California Federation of Music Clubs (CFMC) in 1919, and was elected president of the CFMC in 1926. In the 1930s she was president of the Southwestern District of the NFMC, covering Arizona, Nevada, and California. She was a founding member of the Hollywood Bowl Association, founder and president of the Women's Lyric Club, and served in various leadership roles in the Ebell Club in Los Angeles.

== Personal life ==
Abbie Norton married judge William H. Jamison in 1892. They divorced in the 1910s. She died in 1955, at the age of 86, at a sanitarium in Los Angeles.
