= Bell T. Ritchie =

American musician and vocalist (1893–1970)

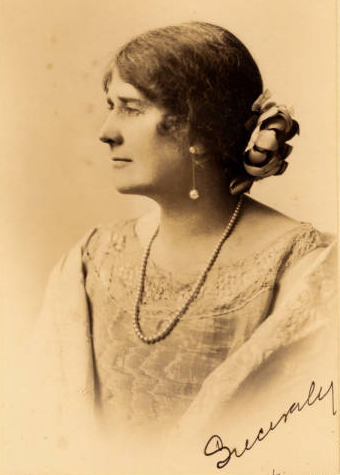
Bell T. Ritchie, 1927

Bell Thompson Ritchie (1893 – December 10, 1970) was a musician and vocalist. Reviewers praised her "full toned, resonant and powerful" voice, her "keen sense of dramatic", and her "unusual musical intelligence".

== Early life ==
Bell Thompson Ritchie was born in 1873 in Glasgow, Scotland, the daughter of John Ritchie and Mary Russell.

The family moved from Scotland to California when her father decided to become a farmer in the valley.

She graduated from University of California, Berkeley in 1897 majoring, she said "in things I didn't want to major in at all – English and Latin". In 1912, she studied in San Francisco under Wallace Sabin who encouraged her to try singing soprano. She studied in San Francisco and New York City, and from 1922 to 1934, went nearly every two years to London to study with Plunkett Greene, the greatest teacher she ever had.

== Career ==
"Who should have singing lessons? Why everyone, my dear. Singing is physically wonderful; it is healthful; it can be an exstatic experience to use your voice as a musical instrument."

— Bell T. Ritchie

Bell T. Ritchie taught high school English and History for several years in Colton, California.

She traveled extensively and knew the out-of-the-way corners of the British Isles, Hebrides, and Scotland, studied the lives of the people, investigating their folklore and rich musical inheritance.

She served for 19 years as president of the Fresno Musical Club, starting in 1913, and during this time established for Fresno the reputation of one of the leading musical centers of the West Coast. She taught music in Fresno.

She also served as President of the California Federation of Music Clubs, which Bessie Bartlett Frankel helped to found.

After retiring, she presented popular opera readings, and in 1964 she presented the reading of the opera based on the Edna St. Vincent Millay poem.

She was named the International Institute's Foreign Born Citizen of the Year in 1968.

== Personal life ==
Bell T. Ritchie moved to California in 1905 and lived in a studio home on Wilson Avenue, Fresno, California; the house was filled with antique furniture and Oriental rugs, which she collected. Her home was shared since 1936 by her friend, Nina Van Den Benden (b. 1895), a language teacher from The Hague, Holland. In 1968 she relocated to Pasadena.

She died on December 10, 1970, and is buried at Belmont Memorial Park, Fresno.

== Legacy ==
Established in 1981, The Fresno Musical Club presents the Bell T. Ritchie Award to classically trained musicians who are career oriented and ready to enter a professional field.
