= California's 7th congressional district =

U.S. House district for California

Coordinates: 38.49°N 121.3°W

- Interactive map of district boundaries
- Representative: Doris Matsui; D–Sacramento
- Population (2025): 780,042
- Median household income: $98,431
- Ethnicity: 31.4% White; 26.7% Hispanic; 23.1% Asian; 10.1% Black; 6.1% Two or more races; 1.6% Pacific Islander Americans; 1.1% other
- Cook PVI: D+16

California's 7th congressional district is a United States congressional district in California. Doris Matsui, a Democrat, has represented the district since January 2023.

Currently, it encompasses southern Sacramento County, part of San Joaquin County, and a portion of El Dorado County. It includes all of Sacramento south of the American River, including Downtown Sacramento, and its suburbs of West Sacramento, Elk Grove, and Galt. It is a heavily Democratic district. Prior to redistricting in 2021, it was entirely in Sacramento County and included the eastern and southern suburbs of Sacramento.

== Competitiveness ==
Containing most of the state capital of Sacramento, the 7th is currently a solidly Democratic district with a D+16 rating from the Cook Partisan Voting Index.

=== Voter registration ===
Registered voter statistics are from the California Secretary of State and are accurate as of September 5th, 2025:

Political Party	Registered Voter Percentage
American Independent	4.32
Democratic	48.84
Green	0.55
Libertarian	1.00
No Party Preference	22.44
Other	0.32
Peace and Freedom	0.77
Republican	21.32
Unknown	0.44

== Recent election results from statewide races ==
Year	Office	Results
2008	President	Obama 66% - 34%
2010	Governor	Brown 64% - 32%
2010	Lt. Governor	Newsom 54% - 37%
2010	Secretary of State	Bowen 62% - 31%
2010	Attorney General	Harris 52% - 40%
2010	Treasurer	Lockyer 63% - 29%
2010	Controller	Chiang 70% - 25%
2012	President	Obama 67% - 33%
2014	Governor	Brown 69% - 31%
2016	President	Clinton 66% - 28%
2018	Governor	Newsom 65% - 35%
2018	Attorney General	Becerra 67% - 33%
2020	President	Biden 67% - 30%
2022	Senate (Reg.)	Padilla 66% - 34%
2022	Governor	Newsom 64% - 36%
2022	Lt. Governor	Kounalakis 65% - 35%
2022	Secretary of State	Weber 66% - 34%
2022	Attorney General	Bonta 64% - 36%
2022	Treasurer	Ma 64% - 36%
2022	Controller	Cohen 59% - 41%
2024	President	Harris 63% - 33%
2024	Senate (Reg.)	Schiff 64% - 36%

== Composition ==
FIPS County Code	County	Seat	Population
67	Sacramento	Sacramento	1,588,921

Under the 2026 redistricting, California's 7th congressional district is located in the Sacramento Valley, encompassing much of Sacramento County and parts of San Joaquin County and El Dorado County. The area in Sacramento County includes the south side of the city of Sacramento; the cities of Galt and Elk Grove; and the census-designated places Florin, Parkway, Arden-Arcade, Vineyard, Lemon Hill, Wilton, Rancho Murieta, Fruitridge Pocket, Freeport, Franklin, Clay, Herald, Hood, Courtland, Walnut Grove, and Isleton.

Sacramento County is split between this district and both the 3rd district and 6th district.

=== Cities and CDPs with 10,000 or more people ===
- Sacramento – 524,943
- Elk Grove – 187,985
- Arden-Arcade – 94,659
- Florin – 52,388
- Vineyard – 43,935
- Galt – 26,536
- Parkway – 15,962
- Lemon Hill – 14,496

=== 2,500 – 10,000 people ===
- Wilton – 5,958
- Rancho Murieta – 5,903
- Fruitridge Pocket – 5,800

== Future composition ==
Beginning with the 2026 election, the 7th district will consist of the following counties:

- El Dorado (part)
- Sacramento (part)
- San Joaquin (part)

== List of members representing the district ==
Representative	Party	Dates	Cong ress(es)	Notes	Counties
District created March 4, 1893
William W. Bowers (San Diego)	Republican	March 4, 1893 – March 3, 1897	53rd 54th	Redistricted from the 6th district and re-elected in 1892. Re-elected in 1894. Lost re-election.	Fresno, Kern, Kings, Madera, Merced, Orange, Riverside, San Benito, San Bernardino, San Diego, Stanislaus, Tulare
Curtis H. Castle (Merced)	Populist	March 4, 1897 – March 3, 1899	55th	Elected in 1896. Lost re-election.	Fresno, Kern, Kings, Madera, Merced, Orange, Riverside, San Benito, San Bernardino, San Diego, Stanislaus, Tulare
James C. Needham (Modesto)	Republican	March 4, 1899 – March 3, 1903	56th 57th	Elected in 1898. Re-elected in 1900. Redistricted to the 6th district.	Fresno, Kern, Kings, Madera, Merced, Orange, Riverside, San Benito, San Bernardino, San Diego, Stanislaus, Tulare
James McLachlan (Pasadena)	Republican	March 4, 1903 – March 3, 1911	58th 59th 60th 61st	Redistricted from the 6th district and re-elected in 1902. Re-elected in 1904. Re-elected in 1906. Re-elected in 1908. Lost renomination.	Los Angeles
William Stephens (Los Angeles)	Republican	March 4, 1911 – March 3, 1913	62nd	Elected in 1910. Redistricted to the 10th district.	Los Angeles
Denver S. Church (Fresno)	Democratic	March 4, 1913 – March 3, 1919	63rd 64th 65th	Elected in 1912. Re-elected in 1914. Re-elected in 1916. Retired.	Fresno, Kern, Kings, Madera, Merced, Stanislaus, Tulare
Henry E. Barbour (Fresno)	Republican	March 4, 1919 – March 3, 1933	66th 67th 68th 69th 70th 71st 72nd	Elected in 1918. Re-elected in 1920. Re-elected in 1922. Re-elected in 1924. Re-elected in 1926. Re-elected in 1928. Re-elected in 1930. Lost re-election.	Fresno, Kern, Kings, Madera, Merced, Stanislaus, Tulare
Ralph R. Eltse (Berkeley)	Republican	March 4, 1933 – January 3, 1935	73rd	Elected in 1932. Lost re-election.	Alameda, Contra Costa
John H. Tolan (Oakland)	Democratic	January 3, 1935 – January 3, 1947	74th 75th 76th 77th 78th 79th	Elected in 1934. Re-elected in 1936. Re-elected in 1938. Re-elected in 1940. Re-elected in 1942. Re-elected in 1944. Retired.	Alameda, Contra Costa
John H. Tolan (Oakland)	Democratic	January 3, 1935 – January 3, 1947	74th 75th 76th 77th 78th 79th	Elected in 1934. Re-elected in 1936. Re-elected in 1938. Re-elected in 1940. Re-elected in 1942. Re-elected in 1944. Retired.	Alameda (Oakland)
John J. Allen Jr. (Oakland)	Republican	January 3, 1947 – January 3, 1959	80th 81st 82nd 83rd 84th 85th	Elected in 1946. Re-elected in 1948. Re-elected in 1950. Re-elected in 1952. Re-elected in 1954. Re-elected in 1956. Lost re-election.	Alameda (Oakland)
Jeffery Cohelan (Berkeley)	Democratic	January 3, 1959 – January 3, 1971	86th 87th 88th 89th 90th 91st	Elected in 1958. Re-elected in 1960. Re-elected in 1962. Re-elected in 1964. Re-elected in 1966. Re-elected in 1968. Lost re-nomination.	Alameda (Oakland)
Ron Dellums (Berkeley)	Democratic	January 3, 1971 – January 3, 1975	92nd 93rd	Elected in 1970. Re-elected in 1972. Redistricted to the 8th district.	Alameda (Oakland)
George Miller (Martinez)	Democratic	January 3, 1975 – January 3, 2013	94th 95th 96th 97th 98th 99th 100th 101st 102nd 103rd 104th 105th 106th 107th 108th 109th 110th 111th 112th	Elected in 1974. Re-elected in 1976. Re-elected in 1978. Re-elected in 1980. Re-elected in 1982. Re-elected in 1984. Re-elected in 1986. Re-elected in 1988. Re-elected in 1990. Re-elected in 1992. Re-elected in 1994. Re-elected in 1996. Re-elected in 1998. Re-elected in 2000. Re-elected in 2002. Re-elected in 2004; Re-elected in 2006. Re-elected in 2008. Re-elected in 2010. Redistricted to the 11th district.	Contra Costa
George Miller (Martinez)	Democratic	January 3, 1975 – January 3, 2013	94th 95th 96th 97th 98th 99th 100th 101st 102nd 103rd 104th 105th 106th 107th 108th 109th 110th 111th 112th	Elected in 1974. Re-elected in 1976. Re-elected in 1978. Re-elected in 1980. Re-elected in 1982. Re-elected in 1984. Re-elected in 1986. Re-elected in 1988. Re-elected in 1990. Re-elected in 1992. Re-elected in 1994. Re-elected in 1996. Re-elected in 1998. Re-elected in 2000. Re-elected in 2002. Re-elected in 2004; Re-elected in 2006. Re-elected in 2008. Re-elected in 2010. Redistricted to the 11th district.	Most of Contra Costa
George Miller (Martinez)	Democratic	January 3, 1975 – January 3, 2013	94th 95th 96th 97th 98th 99th 100th 101st 102nd 103rd 104th 105th 106th 107th 108th 109th 110th 111th 112th	Elected in 1974. Re-elected in 1976. Re-elected in 1978. Re-elected in 1980. Re-elected in 1982. Re-elected in 1984. Re-elected in 1986. Re-elected in 1988. Re-elected in 1990. Re-elected in 1992. Re-elected in 1994. Re-elected in 1996. Re-elected in 1998. Re-elected in 2000. Re-elected in 2002. Re-elected in 2004; Re-elected in 2006. Re-elected in 2008. Re-elected in 2010. Redistricted to the 11th district.	Northwest Contra Costa, southwest Solano
George Miller (Martinez)	Democratic	January 3, 1975 – January 3, 2013	94th 95th 96th 97th 98th 99th 100th 101st 102nd 103rd 104th 105th 106th 107th 108th 109th 110th 111th 112th	Elected in 1974. Re-elected in 1976. Re-elected in 1978. Re-elected in 1980. Re-elected in 1982. Re-elected in 1984. Re-elected in 1986. Re-elected in 1988. Re-elected in 1990. Re-elected in 1992. Re-elected in 1994. Re-elected in 1996. Re-elected in 1998. Re-elected in 2000. Re-elected in 2002. Re-elected in 2004; Re-elected in 2006. Re-elected in 2008. Re-elected in 2010. Redistricted to the 11th district.	2003–2013 Northern Contra Costa, western Solano
Ami Bera (Elk Grove)	Democratic	January 3, 2013 – January 3, 2023	113th 114th 115th 116th 117th	Elected in 2012. Re-elected in 2014. Re-elected in 2016. Re-elected in 2018. Re-elected in 2020. Redistricted to the 6th district.	2013–2023 Eastern Sacramento
Doris Matsui (Sacramento)	Democratic	January 3, 2023 – present	118th 119th	Redistricted from the 6th district and re-elected in 2022. Re-elected in 2024. Re-elected in 2026.	2023–present Sacramento County, parts of Yolo County and Solano County

== Election results for representatives ==
=== 1892 ===
United States House of Representatives elections, 1892
Party	Candidate	Votes	%
Republican	William W. Bowers (inc.)	15,856	41.6
Democratic	Olin Welborn	14,869	39.0
Populist	Hiram Hamilton	5,578	14.6
Prohibition	M. B. Harris	1,844	4.8
Total votes		38,147	100.0
Turnout			
Republican hold			

=== 1894 ===
United States House of Representatives elections, 1894
Party	Candidate	Votes	%
Republican	William W. Bowers (inc.)	18,434	42.9
Democratic	William H. Alford	12,111	28.2
Populist	J. L. Gilbert	10,719	25.0
Prohibition	W. H. Somers	1,669	3.9
Total votes		42,933	100.0
Turnout			
Republican hold			

=== 1896 ===
United States House of Representatives elections, 1896
Party	Candidate	Votes	%
Populist	Curtis H. Castle	19,183	46.7
Republican	William W. Bowers (inc.)	18,939	46.1
Independent	William H. "Billy" Carlson	2,139	5.2
Prohibition	James W. Webb	802	2.0
Total votes		41,063	100.0
Turnout			
Populist gain from Republican			

=== 1898 ===
United States House of Representatives elections, 1898
Party	Candidate	Votes	%
Republican	James C. Needham	20,793	50.1
Populist	Curtis H. Castle (incumbent)	20,680	49.9
Total votes		41,473	100.0
Turnout			
Republican gain from Populist			

=== 1900 ===
United States House of Representatives elections, 1900
Party	Candidate	Votes	%
Republican	James C. Needham (inc.)	23,450	52.4
Democratic	W. D. Crichton	18,981	42.4
Socialist	Noble A. Richardson	1,385	3.1
Prohibition	A. H. Hensley	919	2.1
Total votes		44,735	100.0
Turnout			
Republican hold			

=== 1902 ===
United States House of Representatives elections, 1902
Party	Candidate	Votes	%
Republican	James McLachlan (inc.)	19,407	64.8
Democratic	Carl A. Johnson	8,075	27.0
Socialist	George H. Hewes	1,261	4.2
Prohibition	Frederick F. Wheeler	1,195	4.0
Total votes		30,638	100.0
Turnout			
Republican hold			

=== 1904 ===
United States House of Representatives elections, 1904
Party	Candidate	Votes	%
Republican	James McLachlan (inc.)	31,091	64.2
Democratic	W. O. Morton	11,259	23.3
Socialist	F. I. Wheat	3,594	7.4
Prohibition	John Sobieski	2,467	5.1
Total votes		48,411	100.0
Turnout			
Republican hold			

=== 1906 ===
United States House of Representatives elections, 1906
Party	Candidate	Votes	%
Republican	James McLachlan (inc.)	22,338	56.8
Democratic	Robert G. Laucks	11,197	28.4
Socialist	Claude Riddle	3,641	9.2
Prohibition	Levi D. Johnson	2,189	5.6
Total votes		39,365	100.0
Turnout			
Republican hold			

=== 1908 ===
United States House of Representatives elections, 1908
Party	Candidate	Votes	%
Republican	James McLachlan (inc.)	37,244	51.9
Democratic	Jud R. Rush	25,445	35.4
Socialist	A. R. Holston	4,432	6.2
Prohibition	Marshall W. Atwood	3,899	5.4
Independence	F. G. Hentig	791	1.1
Total votes		71,811	100.0
Turnout			
Republican hold			

=== 1910 ===
United States House of Representatives elections, 1910
Party	Candidate	Votes	%
Republican	William Stephens (incumbent)	36,435	58.7
Democratic	Lorin A. Handley	13,340	21.5
Socialist	Thomas V. Williams	10,305	16.6
Prohibition	C. V. LeFontaine	1,990	3.2
Total votes		62,070	100.0
Turnout			
Republican hold			

=== 1912 ===
United States House of Representatives elections, 1912
Party	Candidate	Votes	%
Democratic	Denver S. Church (inc.)	23,752	44.0
Republican	James C. Needham	22,994	42.7
Socialist	J. S. Cato	7,171	13.3
Total votes		53,917	100.0
Turnout			
Democratic hold			

=== 1914 ===
United States House of Representatives elections, 1914
Party	Candidate	Votes	%
Democratic	Denver S. Church (inc.)	39,389	49.9
Republican	A. M. Drew	25,106	31.8
Socialist	Harry M. McKee	7,797	9.9
Prohibition	Don A. Allen	6,573	8.3
Total votes		78,865	100.0
Turnout			
Democratic hold			

=== 1916 ===
United States House of Representatives elections, 1916
Party	Candidate	Votes	%
Democratic	Denver S. Church (inc.)	38,787	51.0
Republican	W. W. Phillips	27,676	36.4
Socialist	Harry M. McKee	5,492	7.2
Prohibition	J. F. Butler	4,042	5.3
Total votes		75,997	100.0
Turnout			
Democratic hold			

=== 1918 ===
United States House of Representatives elections, 1918
Party	Candidate	Votes	%
Republican	Henry E. Barbour	33,476	52.1
Democratic	Henry Hawson	30,745	47.9
Total votes		64,221	100.0
Turnout			
Republican gain from Democratic			

=== 1920 ===
United States House of Representatives elections, 1920
Party	Candidate	Votes	%
Republican	Henry E. Barbour (incumbent)	57,647	87.2
Socialist	Harry M. McKee	8,449	12.8
Total votes		66,096	100.0
Turnout			
Republican hold			

=== 1922 ===
United States House of Representatives elections, 1922
Party	Candidate	Votes	%
Republican	Henry E. Barbour (incumbent)	67,000	100.0
Turnout			
Republican hold			

=== 1924 ===
United States House of Representatives elections, 1924
Party	Candidate	Votes	%
Republican	Henry E. Barbour (incumbent)	65,740	100.0
Turnout			
Republican hold			

=== 1926 ===
United States House of Representatives elections, 1926
Party	Candidate	Votes	%
Republican	Henry E. Barbour (incumbent)	73,271	100.0
Turnout			
Republican hold			

=== 1928 ===
United States House of Representatives elections, 1928
Party	Candidate	Votes	%
Republican	Henry E. Barbour (incumbent)	71,195	100.0
Turnout			
Republican hold			

=== 1930 ===
United States House of Representatives elections, 1930
Party	Candidate	Votes	%
Republican	Henry E. Barbour (incumbent)	79,041	100.0
Turnout			
Republican hold			

=== 1932 ===
United States House of Representatives elections, 1932
Party	Candidate	Votes	%
Republican	Ralph R. Eltse	45,944	45.5
Democratic	Frank V. Cornish	32,365	32.0
Socialist	J. Stitt Wilson	22,767	22.5
Total votes		101,076	100.0
Turnout			
Republican win (new seat)			

=== 1934 ===
United States House of Representatives elections, 1934
Party	Candidate	Votes	%
Democratic	John H. Tolan	51,962	52.3
Republican	Ralph R. Eltse (incumbent)	47,414	47.7
Total votes		99,376	100.0
Turnout			
Democratic gain from Republican			

=== 1936 ===
United States House of Representatives elections, 1936
Party	Candidate	Votes	%
Democratic	John H. Tolan (incumbent)	69,463	59.8
Republican	Charles W. Fisher	46,647	40.2
Total votes		116,110	100.0
Turnout			
Democratic hold			

=== 1938 ===
United States House of Representatives elections, 1938
Party	Candidate	Votes	%
Democratic	John H. Tolan (incumbent)	62,599	55.3
Republican	Charles W. Fisher	50,504	44.7
Total votes		113,103	100.0
Turnout			
Democratic hold			

=== 1940 ===
United States House of Representatives elections, 1940
Party	Candidate	Votes	%
Democratic	John H. Tolan (incumbent)	72,838	55.5
Republican	Ralph R. Eltse	56,808	43.2
Communist	Alfred N. Johnson	1,707	1.3
Total votes		131,353	100.0
Turnout			
Democratic hold			

=== 1942 ===
United States House of Representatives elections, 1942
Party	Candidate	Votes	%
Democratic	John H. Tolan (incumbent)	77,292	100.0
Turnout			
Democratic hold			

=== 1944 ===
United States House of Representatives elections, 1944
Party	Candidate	Votes	%
Democratic	John H. Tolan (incumbent)	81,762	57.9
Republican	Chelsey M. Walter	59,360	42.1
Total votes		141,122	100.0
Turnout			
Democratic gain from Republican			

=== 1946 ===
United States House of Representatives elections, 1946
Party	Candidate	Votes	%
Republican	John J. Allen, Jr.	61,508	56.2
Democratic	Patrick W. McDonough	47,988	43.8
Total votes		109,496	100.0
Turnout			
Republican gain from Democratic			

=== 1948 ===
United States House of Representatives elections, 1948
Party	Candidate	Votes	%
Republican	John J. Allen, Jr. (incumbent)	78,534	51.4
Democratic	Buell G. Gallagher	74,318	48.6
Total votes		152,852	100.0
Turnout			
Republican hold			

=== 1950 ===
United States House of Representatives elections, 1950
Party	Candidate	Votes	%
Republican	John J. Allen, Jr. (incumbent)	74,069	55.3
Democratic	Lyle E. Cook	59,976	44.7
Total votes		134,045	100.0
Turnout			
Republican hold			

=== 1952 ===
United States House of Representatives elections, 1952
Party	Candidate	Votes	%
Republican	John J. Allen, Jr. (incumbent)	120,666	84.3
Progressive	John Allen Johnson	22,408	15.7
Total votes		142,074	100.0
Turnout			
Republican hold			

=== 1954 ===
United States House of Representatives elections, 1954
Party	Candidate	Votes	%
Republican	John J. Allen, Jr. (incumbent)	64,083	53
Democratic	Stanley K. Crook	56,807	47
Total votes		120,890	100
Turnout			
Republican hold			

=== 1956 ===
United States House of Representatives elections, 1956
Party	Candidate	Votes	%
Republican	John J. Allen, Jr. (incumbent)	75,932	52.8
Democratic	Laurance L. Cross	67,931	47.2
Total votes		143,863	100.0
Turnout			
Republican hold			

=== 1958 ===
United States House of Representatives elections, 1958
Party	Candidate	Votes	%
Democratic	Jeffery Cohelan	65,699	50.9
Republican	John J. Allen, Jr. (incumbent)	63,270	49.1
Total votes		128,969	100.0
Turnout			
Democratic gain from Republican			

=== 1960 ===
United States House of Representatives elections, 1960
Party	Candidate	Votes	%
Democratic	Jeffery Cohelan (incumbent)	79,776	57.1
Republican	Lewis F. Sherman	60,065	42.9
Total votes		139,841	100.0
Turnout			
Democratic hold			

=== 1962 ===
United States House of Representatives elections, 1962
Party	Candidate	Votes	%
Democratic	Jeffery Cohelan (incumbent)	86,215	64.5
Republican	Leonard L. Cantando	47,409	35.5
Total votes		133,624	100.0
Turnout			
Democratic hold			

=== 1964 ===
United States House of Representatives elections, 1964
Party	Candidate	Votes	%
Democratic	Jeffery Cohelan (incumbent)	100,901	66.1
Republican	Lawrence E. McNutt	51,675	33.9
Total votes		192,576	100.0
Turnout			
Democratic hold			

=== 1966 ===
United States House of Representatives elections, 1966
Party	Candidate	Votes	%
Democratic	Jeffery Cohelan (incumbent)	84,644	64.4
Republican	Malcolm M. Champlin	46,763	35.6
Total votes		131,407	100.0
Turnout			
Democratic hold			

=== 1968 ===
United States House of Representatives elections, 1968
Party	Candidate	Votes	%
Democratic	Jeffery Cohelan (incumbent)	102,108	62.9
Republican	Barney E. Hilburn	48,133	29.6
Peace and Freedom	Huey P. Newton	12,164	7.5
Total votes		162,405	100.0
Turnout			
Democratic hold			

=== 1970 ===
United States House of Representatives elections, 1970
Party	Candidate	Votes	%
Democratic	Ron Dellums	89,784	57.3
Republican	John E. Healy	64,691	41.3
Peace and Freedom	Sarah Scahill	2,156	1.4
Total votes		156,631	100
Turnout			
Democratic hold			

=== 1972 ===
United States House of Representatives elections, 1972
Party	Candidate	Votes	%
Democratic	Ron Dellums (incumbent)	126,351	60
Republican	Peter Hannaford	85,851	38
American Independent	Frank V. Cortese	13,430	2
Total votes		225,632	100
Turnout			
Democratic hold			

=== 1974 ===
United States House of Representatives elections, 1974
Party	Candidate	Votes	%
Democratic	George Miller	82,765	55.6
Republican	Gary Fernandez	66,115	44.4
Total votes		148,880	100.0
Turnout			
Democratic hold			

=== 1976 ===
United States House of Representatives elections, 1976
Party	Candidate	Votes	%
Democratic	George Miller (incumbent)	147,064	74.7
Republican	Robert L. Vickers	45,863	23.3
American Independent	Melvin E. Stanley	3,889	2.0
Total votes		196,816	100.0
Turnout			
Democratic hold			

=== 1978 ===
United States House of Representatives elections, 1978
Party	Candidate	Votes	%
Democratic	George Miller (incumbent)	109,676	63.4
Republican	Paula Gordon	58,332	33.7
American Independent	Melvin E. Stanley	4,857	2.8
Total votes		172,865	100.0
Turnout			
Democratic hold			

=== 1980 ===
United States House of Representatives elections, 1980
Party	Candidate	Votes	%
Democratic	George Miller (incumbent)	142,044	63.3
Republican	Giles St. Clair	70,479	31.4
Libertarian	Steve Snow	6,923	3.1
American Independent	Thomas J. Thompson	5,023	2.2
Total votes		224,469	100.0
Turnout			
Democratic hold			

=== 1982 ===
United States House of Representatives elections, 1982
Party	Candidate	Votes	%
Democratic	George Miller (incumbent)	126,952	67.2
Republican	Paul E. Vallely	56,960	30.2
Libertarian	Richard Newell	2,752	1.5
American Independent	Terry L. Wells	2,205	1.2
Total votes		188,869	100.0
Turnout			
Democratic hold			

=== 1984 ===
United States House of Representatives elections, 1984
Party	Candidate	Votes	%
Democratic	George Miller (incumbent)	158,306	66.7
Republican	Rosemary Thakar	78,985	33.3
Total votes		237,291	100.0
Turnout			
Democratic hold			

=== 1986 ===
United States House of Representatives elections, 1986
Party	Candidate	Votes	%
Democratic	George Miller (incumbent)	124,174	66.6
Republican	Rosemary Thakar	62,379	33.4
Total votes		186,553	100.0
Turnout			
Democratic hold			

=== 1988 ===
United States House of Representatives elections, 1988
Party	Candidate	Votes	%
Democratic	George Miller (incumbent)	170,006	68.4
Republican	Jean Last	78,478	31.6
Total votes		248,484	100.0
Turnout			
Democratic hold			

=== 1990 ===
United States House of Representatives elections, 1990
Party	Candidate	Votes	%
Democratic	George Miller (incumbent)	121,080	60.5
Republican	Roger A. Payton	79,031	39.5
Total votes		200,111	100.0
Turnout			
Democratic hold			

=== 1992 ===
United States House of Representatives elections, 1992
Party	Candidate	Votes	%
Democratic	George Miller (incumbent)	153,320	70.3
Republican	Dave Scholl	54,822	25.2
Peace and Freedom	David L. Franklin	9,840	4.5
Total votes		217,982	100.0
Turnout			
Democratic hold			

=== 1994 ===
United States House of Representatives elections, 1994
Party	Candidate	Votes	%
Democratic	George Miller (incumbent)	116,015	69.69
Republican	Charles V. Hughes	45,698	27.43
Peace and Freedom	William A. "Bill" Callison	4,798	2.88
Total votes		166,601	100.0
Turnout			
Democratic hold			

=== 1996 ===
United States House of Representatives elections, 1996
Party	Candidate	Votes	%
Democratic	George Miller (incumbent)	137,089	71.9
Republican	Norman Reece	42,542	22.3
Reform	William Thompson	6,866	3.5
Natural Law	Bruce Kendall	4,420	2.3
Total votes		190,917	100.0
Turnout			
Democratic hold			

=== 1998 ===
United States House of Representatives elections, 1998
Party	Candidate	Votes	%
Democratic	George Miller (incumbent)	125,842	76.67
Republican	Norman H. Reece	38,290	23.33
Total votes		164,132	100.0
Turnout			
Democratic hold			

=== 2000 ===
2000 United States House of Representatives elections in California
Party	Candidate	Votes	%
Democratic	George Miller (incumbent)	159,692	76.5
Republican	Christopher A. Hoffman	44,154	21.2
Natural Law	Martin Sproul	4,943	2.3
Total votes		208,789	100.0
Turnout			
Democratic hold			

=== 2002 ===
2002 United States House of Representatives elections in California
Party	Candidate	Votes	%
Democratic	George Miller (incumbent)	97,849	70.8
Republican	Charles R. Hargrave	36,584	26.4
Libertarian	Scott A. Wilson	3,943	2.8
Total votes		138,376	100.0
Turnout			
Democratic hold			

=== 2004 ===
2004 United States House of Representatives elections in California
Party	Candidate	Votes	%
Democratic	George Miller (incumbent)	166,831	76.1
Republican	Charles Hargrave	52,446	23.9
Total votes		219,277	100.0
Turnout			
Democratic hold			

=== 2006 ===
2006 United States House of Representatives elections in California
Party	Candidate	Votes	%
Democratic	George Miller (incumbent)	118,000	84.0
Libertarian	Camden McConnell	22,486	16.0
Total votes		140,486	100.0
Turnout			
Democratic hold			

=== 2008 ===
2008 United States House of Representatives elections in California
Party	Candidate	Votes	%
Democratic	George Miller (incumbent)	170,962	72.82
Republican	Roger Allen Petersen	51,166	21.79
Peace and Freedom	Bill Callison	6,695	2.85
Libertarian	Camden McConnell	5,950	2.53
Total votes		234,773	100.0
Turnout			
Democratic hold			

=== 2010 ===
2010 United States House of Representatives elections in California
Party	Candidate	Votes	%
Democratic	George Miller (incumbent)	122,435	68%
Republican	Rick Tubbs	56,764	32%
Total votes		179,199	100%
Turnout			
Democratic hold			

=== 2012 ===
United States House of Representatives elections, 2012
Party	Candidate	Votes	%
Democratic	Ami Bera	141,241	51.7%
Republican	Dan Lungren (Incumbent)	132,050	48.3%
Total votes		273,291	100.0%
Democratic gain from Republican			

=== 2014 ===
United States House of Representatives elections, 2014
Party	Candidate	Votes	%
Democratic	Ami Bera (Incumbent)	92,521	50.4%
Republican	Doug Ose	91,066	49.6%
Total votes		183,587	100.0%
Democratic hold			

=== 2016 ===
United States House of Representatives elections, 2016
Party	Candidate	Votes	%
Democratic	Ami Bera (Incumbent)	152,133	51.2%
Republican	Scott Jones	145,168	48.8%
Total votes		297,301	100.0%
Democratic hold			

=== 2018 ===
2018 United States House of Representatives elections in California
Party	Candidate	Votes	%
Democratic	Ami Bera (incumbent)	155,016	55%
Republican	Andrew Grant	126,601	45%
Total votes		281,617	100%
Democratic hold			

=== 2020 ===
2020 United States House of Representatives elections in California
Party	Candidate	Votes	%
Democratic	Ami Bera (incumbent)	217,416	56.6
Republican	Buzz Patterson	166,549	43.4
Total votes		383,965	100.0
Democratic hold			

=== 2022 ===
2022 United States House of Representatives elections in California
Party	Candidate	Votes	%
Democratic	Doris Matsui (incumbent)	150,618	68.3
Republican	Max Semenenko	70,033	31.7
Total votes		220,651	100.0
Democratic hold			

=== 2024 ===
2024 United States House of Representatives elections in California
Party	Candidate	Votes	%
Democratic	Doris Matsui (incumbent)	197,429	66.8
Republican	Tom Silva	98,341	33.2
Total votes		295,770	100.0
Democratic hold			

== Historical district boundaries ==
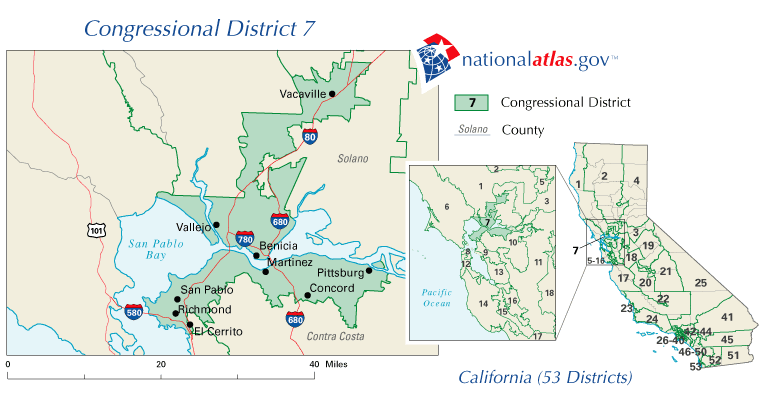
2003 - 2013

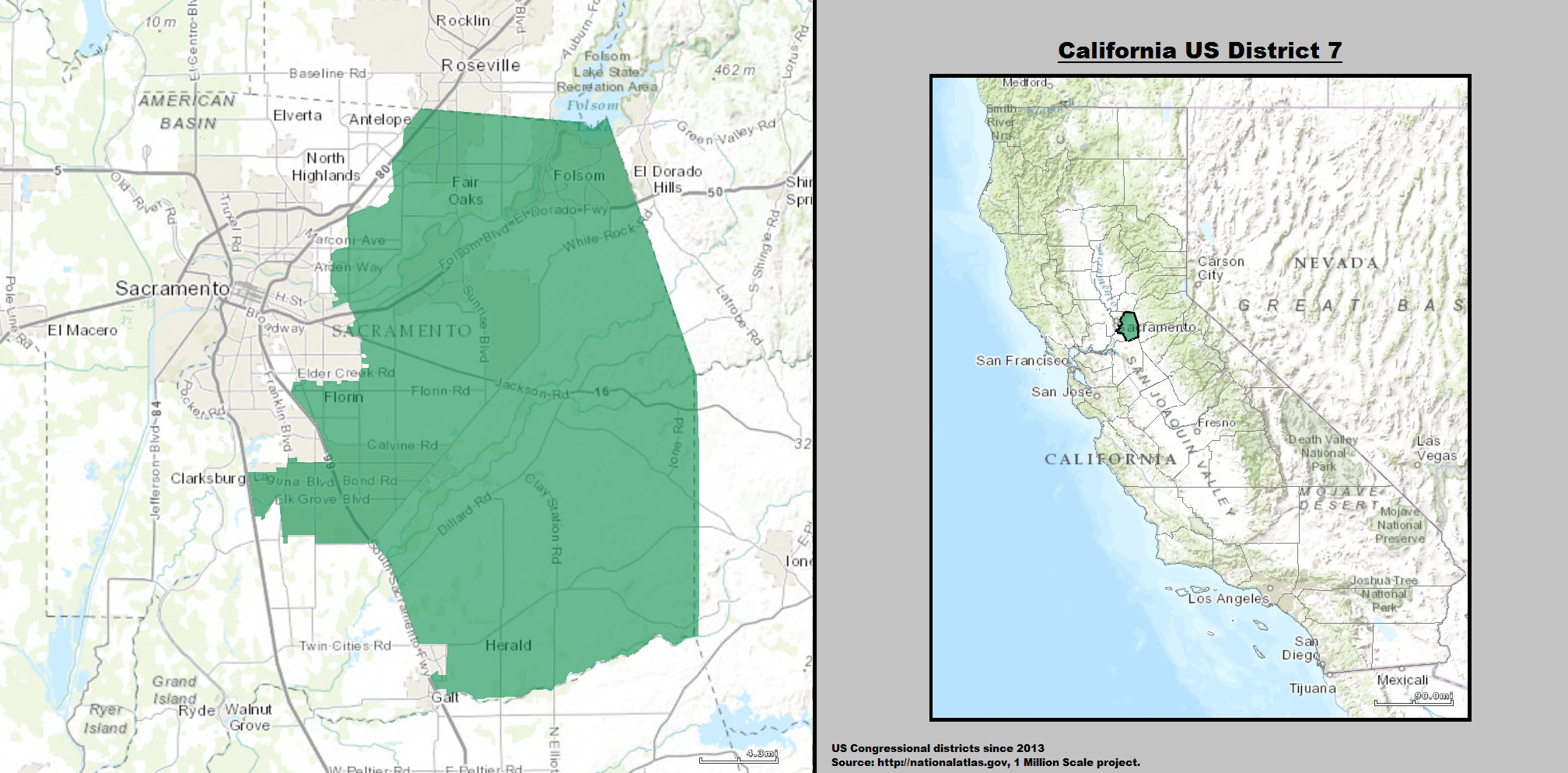
2013 - 2023

== See also ==
- List of United States congressional districts
- California's congressional districts
