= Bessie Marshall Whitely =

American composer, pianist, and teacher

Bessie Marshall Whitely or Whiteley (December 25, 1871 - November 7, 1944) was an American composer, pianist, and teacher. She attended the Oakland Conservatory of Music in Oakland, California, and studied with H. G. Pasmore, J. P. Morgan, and Louis Lesser. Whitely was a piano teacher and music supervisor in Kansas City, Missouri, for 32 years.

Whitely published an article on Form and Spirit in Music in the journal Music in 1892. Her opera Hiawatha's Childhood won the National Federation of Music Clubs award in 1912. Her music was published by G. Schirmer, Inc. and C. C. Birchard & Co. (later Summy-Birchard, then Birchtree Ltd.). Her compositions include:

== Opera ==
- Hiawatha's Childhood (for unchanged voices; composer)
- Pandora (text based on Henry Wadsworth Longfellow's Masque of Pandora)
- Sarita

== Orchestra ==
- Five Symphonic Sketches

== Vocal ==
- Four Winds (men's quartet)
- Garden of Buddha (woman's voice + men's quartet)
- Goblin (words by Florence C. Fox; music by Bessie Marshall Whitely)
- Hymn
- Landing of the Pilgrims
- Missouri
- Muramadzu (tenor and orchestra)
- Shadows (voice and piano; unspecified award winner)
- Three Madrigals (a capella chorus)
