= John H. Tolan =

American politician

John Tolan
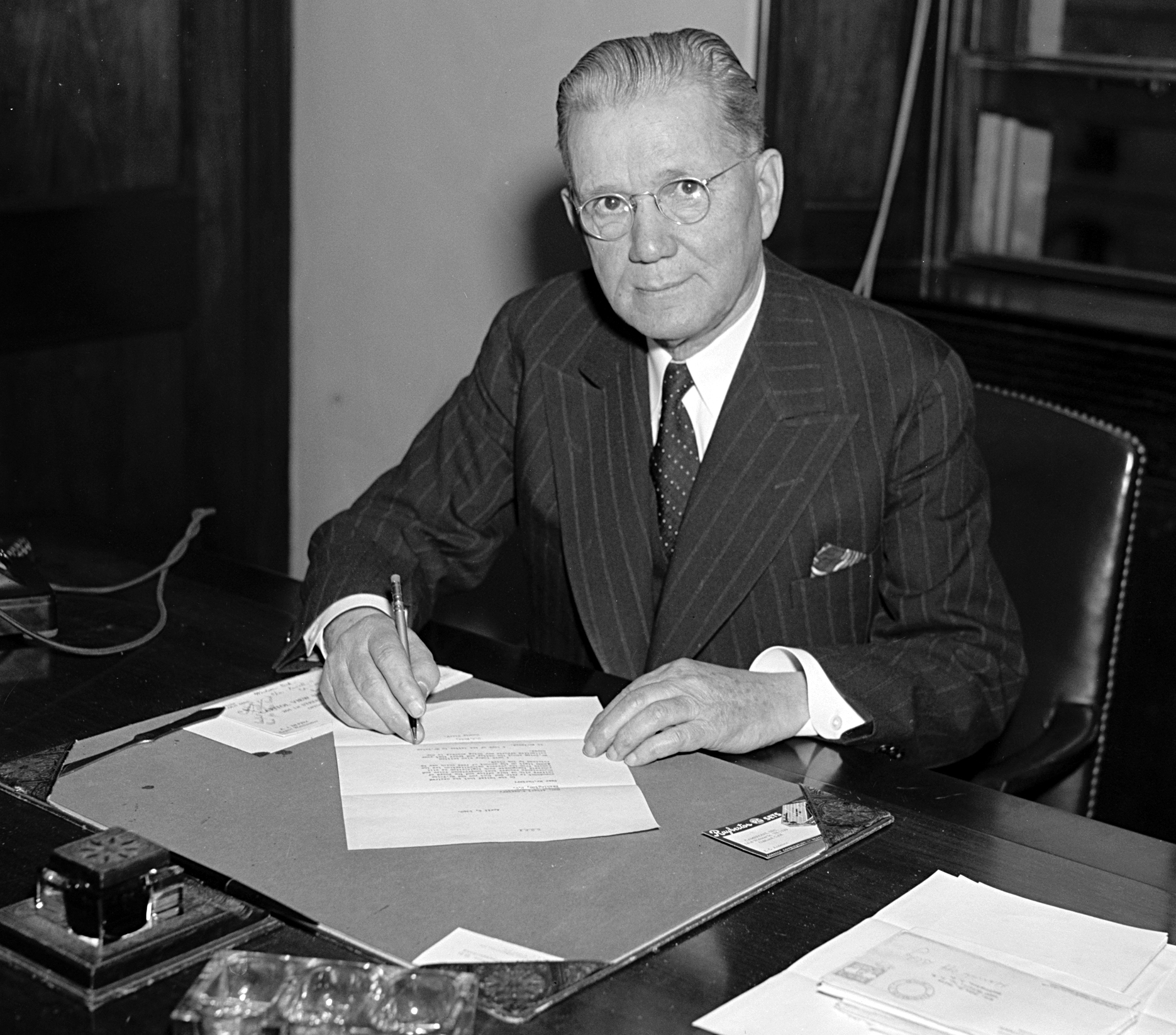

Member of the U.S. House of Representatives from California's 7th district
- In office January 3, 1935 – January 3, 1947
- Preceded by: Ralph Eltse
- Succeeded by: John J. Allen, Jr.

Personal details
- Born: John Harvey Tolan; January 15, 1877 St. Peter, Minnesota, U.S.
- Died: June 30, 1947 (aged 70) Westwood, California, U.S.
- Party: Democratic Party

John Harvey Tolan (/ˈtoʊlæn/; January 15, 1877 – June 30, 1947) was an American lawyer and politician who served six terms as a U.S. Representative from California from 1935 to 1947.

== Biography ==
Born in St. Peter, Minnesota, Tolan attended the public schools. He moved to Anaconda, Montana, in 1897. He was graduated from the law department of the University of Kansas at Lawrence in 1902.

=== Legal career ===
He was admitted to the bar the same year and commenced the practice of law in Anaconda, Montana and served as attorney of Deer Lodge County, Montana from 1904 to 1906. He moved to Oakland, California, in 1914 and continued the practice of law.

=== Congress ===
Tolan was elected as a Democrat to the Seventy-fourth and to the five succeeding Congresses (January 3, 1935 – January 3, 1947). He was not a candidate for renomination in 1946 to the Eightieth Congress.

=== Death ===
He died in Westwood, California, on June 30, 1947.

== Electoral history ==
United States House of Representatives elections, 1934
Party	Candidate	Votes	%
Democratic	John H. Tolan	51,962	52.3
Republican	Ralph R. Eltse (incumbent)	47,414	47.7
Total votes		99,376	100.0
Turnout			
Democratic gain from Republican			

United States House of Representatives elections, 1936
Party	Candidate	Votes	%
Democratic	John H. Tolan (incumbent)	69,463	59.8
Republican	Charles W. Fisher	46,647	40.2
Total votes		116,110	100.0
Turnout			
Democratic hold			

United States House of Representatives elections, 1938
Party	Candidate	Votes	%
Democratic	John H. Tolan (incumbent)	62,599	55.3
Republican	Charles W. Fisher	50,504	44.7
Total votes		113,103	100.0
Turnout			
Democratic hold			

United States House of Representatives elections, 1940
Party	Candidate	Votes	%
Democratic	John H. Tolan (incumbent)	72,838	55.5
Republican	Ralph R. Eltse	56,808	43.2
Communist	Alfred N. Johnson	1,707	1.3
Total votes		131,353	100.0
Turnout			
Democratic hold			

United States House of Representatives elections, 1942
Party	Candidate	Votes	%
Democratic	John H. Tolan (incumbent)	77,292	100.0
Turnout			
Democratic hold			

United States House of Representatives elections, 1944
Party	Candidate	Votes	%
Democratic	John H. Tolan (incumbent)	81,762	57.9
Republican	Chelsey M. Walter	59,360	42.1
Total votes		141,122	100.0
Turnout			
Democratic gain from Republican			

== Notes ==
U.S. House of Representatives
Preceded by Ralph R. Eltse	Member of the U.S. House of Representatives from California's 7th congressional district 1935–1947	Succeeded by John J. Allen, Jr.
