= Olivia Dudley Bucknam =

Olivia D. Dudley Bucknam
- Born: Olivia D. Dudley; November 16, 1874; Bryant Pond, Maine, U.S.
- Died: November 15, 1966 (aged 91); Los Angeles, California, U.S.
- Occupation(s): Community leader, president of the Opera Reading Club, Hollywood
- Known for: Leadership in musical and cultural organizations
- Board member of: California Federation of Music Clubs, Cadman Creative Club, Woman's Committee of the Los Angeles Philharmonic Orchestra, Woman's Committee of the Los Angeles Grand Opera Association, Summer Concert Committee of the Hollywood Bowl Association
- Spouse: Ralph Waldo Emerson Bucknam (m. 1903)

Olivia D. Dudley Bucknam (November 16, 1874 – November 15, 1966) was president of the Opera Reading Club, Hollywood.

== Early life ==
Olivia D. Dudley was born in Bryant Pond, Maine, on November 16, 1874, the daughter of Ansel Dudley and Josephine E. Childs.

== Career ==
She was active in musical affairs of the community. She was first vice-president of the California Federation of Music Clubs and Cadman Creative Club. She was president and honorary president of the Opera Reading Club, Hollywood. She was a member of the executive board of the Woman's Committee of the Los Angeles Philharmonic Orchestra, the Woman's Committee of the Los Angeles Grand Opera Association and the Summer Concert Committee of the Hollywood Bowl Association.

She was a member of the Woman's Club, Hollywood, Wa Wan Club, Hollywood chapter of Daughters of the American Revolution, Gables Beach Club.

== Personal life ==
She moved to Hollywood, California, in 1914.

On February 10, 1903, she married Dr. Ralph Waldo Emerson Bucknam, a practicing physician in Hollywood since 1914. He was born in Lewiston, Maine, and obtained his education in Bowdoin Medical College and Harvard Medical School.

She died on November 15, 1966, in Los Angeles, California.
