= Belmont Memorial Park =

Cemetery in Fresno, California, United States

Coordinates: 36°44′41″N 119°49′38″W

Belmont Memorial Park is a cemetery located in Fresno, Fresno County, California.

== Notable interments ==
Notable burials include:

- Henry Ellsworth Barbour (1877–1945), U.S. Representative
- Denver Church (1862–1952), U.S. Representative
- Walter Huston (1884–1950), actor
- Joe Jenkins (1890–1974), professional baseball player
- Richard Kiel (1939–2014), actor
- Bill Vukovich (1918–1955), Indianapolis 500 winner
- Billy Vukovich III (1963–1990), race car driver
- Harold Zinkin (1922–2004), inventor of the Universal Gym Machine
- Bell T. Ritchie (1893–1970), president of the Fresno Musical Club which still today awards the Bell T. Ritchie Award to classically trained musicians
- Karen Pendleton (1946–2019), Original Mouseketeer, Walt Disney's Mickey Mouse Club
