= Abigail Keasey Frankel =

American social club leader

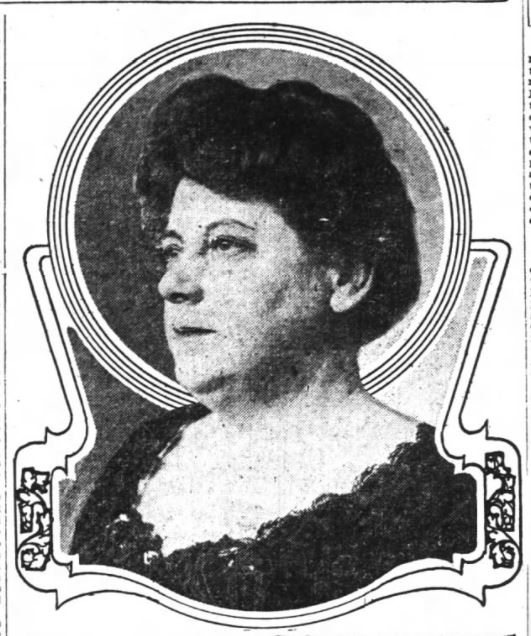
Abigail Keasey Frankel, 1914

Abigail Keasey Frankel (died August 15, 1931) was a prominent club and civic worker of Portland. When the Oregon Federation of Business and Professional Women was formed, she was its first President.

== Early life ==
Abigail Keasey was born in Fayette, Iowa, the daughter of Eden W. and Nella S. Keasey.

== Career ==
Abigail Keasey Frankel was active in club affairs. She was the President of the State Federation of Women's Clubs. She was a member of the Board of the Missouri Federation of Women's Clubs and President of the 8th District of the Missouri Federation. She was the President of the Portland Woman's Club and the chairman of the finance of the Woman's Building association.

She was for eight years a member of National Federation of Music Clubs as Librarian, Secretary, and First Vice-President.

She organized the Portland Federation of Women's Organizations, acting as the first President.

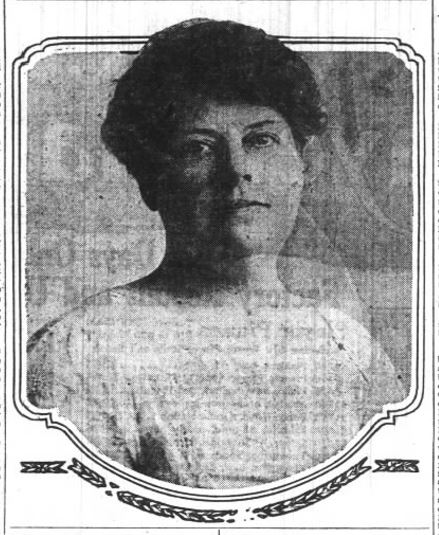
Abigail Keasey Frankel, 1921

She was for four years Secretary and lecturer for Anti-Narcotic Association of Portland, Oregon; for three years she was Superintendent of the Woman's Protective Division (Social Service) of Portland; she was the first President that the State Federation of Business and Professional Women of Oregon ever had. The Oregon Federation of Business and Professional Women's clubs had a membership of six clubs: the Business Woman's Club and the Woman's Advertising Club of Portland, the Dalles Business Woman's Club, the Salem Business Woman's Club, and the Marshfield Woman's Club.

She was president of the Portland Presidents Club and of the Oregon Federation of Women's Clubs.

She was a member of the Daughters of the American Revolution.

== Personal life ==
Abigail Keasey Frankel was a former resident of Missouri, and moved to Portland, Oregon, in 1910, and lived at 8 East 17th. Street.

She died on August 15, 1931.
