= Denver S. Church =

American politician

Denver Church
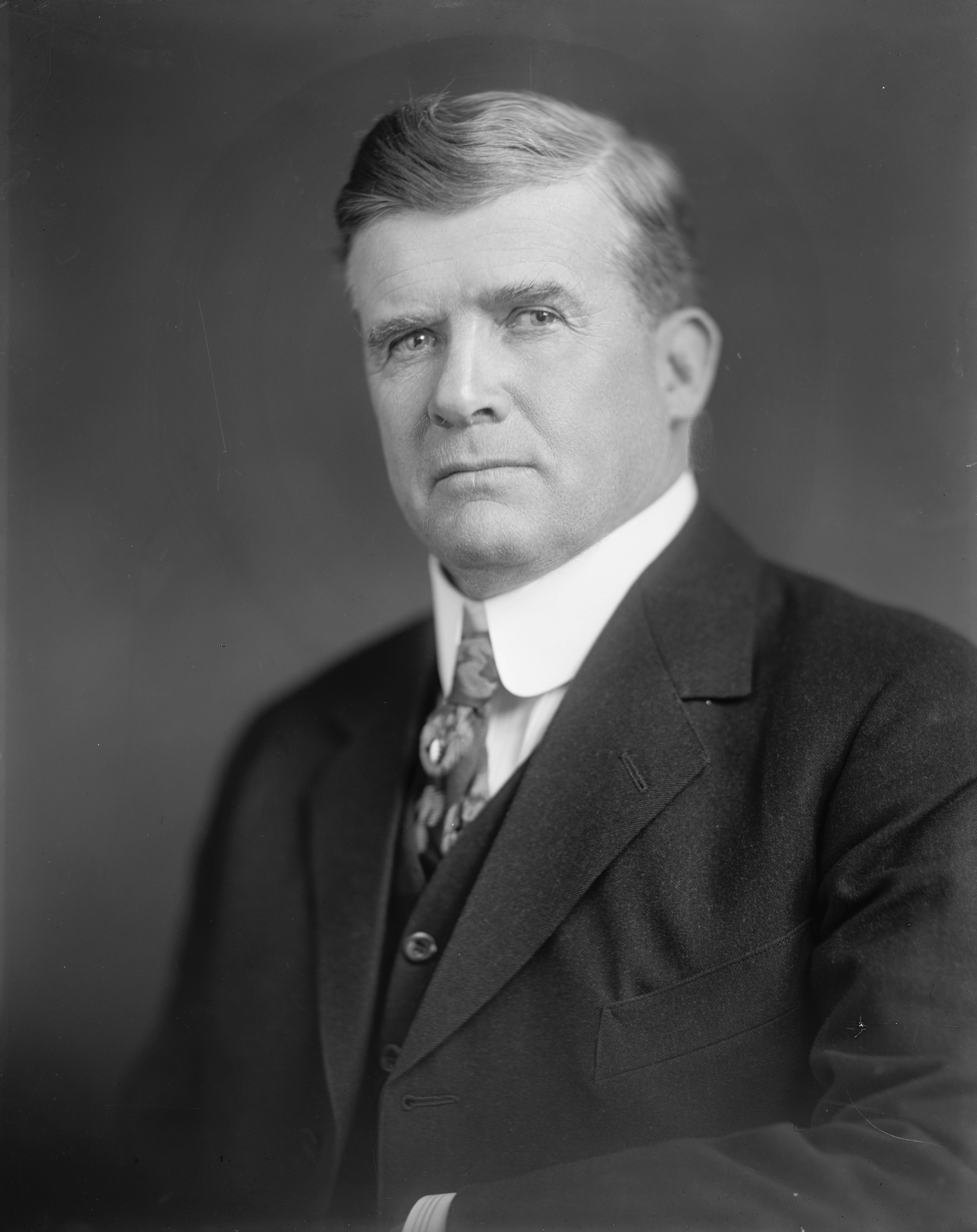

Member of the U.S. House of Representatives from California
- In office March 4, 1913 – March 4, 1919
- Preceded by: William D. Stephens
- Succeeded by: Henry E. Barbour
- Constituency: 7th district
- In office March 4, 1933 – January 3, 1935
- Preceded by: William E. Evans
- Succeeded by: Bertrand W. Gearhart
- Constituency: 9th district

Personal details
- Born: December 11, 1862 Folsom, California, U.S.
- Died: February 21, 1952 (aged 89) Fresno, California, U.S.
- Resting place: Belmont Memorial Park, U.S.
- Party: Democratic

Denver Samuel Church (December 11, 1862 – February 21, 1952) was an American lawyer and politician who served three terms as a U.S. representative from California from 1913 to 1919, then a fourth term from 1933 to 1935.

== Biography ==
Born in Folsom, California, Church attended the common schools. He was graduated from Healdsburg (California) College in 1885 and then studied law. Church was admitted to the bar in 1893 and commenced practice in Fresno, California. He served as district attorney of Fresno County from 1907 to 1913, and was a delegate to the Democratic National Convention in 1916.

=== Congress ===
Church was elected as a Democrat to the Sixty-third, Sixty-fourth, and Sixty-fifth Congresses (March 4, 1913 – March 3, 1919). On April 5, 1917, he was one of 50 representatives who voted against declaring war on Germany. He did not seek renomination in 1918.

He resumed the practice of law in Fresno and served as a judge of the Fresno County Superior Court from 1924 to 1930.

Church was elected to the Seventy-third Congress (March 4, 1933 – January 3, 1935), but was not a candidate for renomination in 1934.

== Later career and death ==
He resumed the practice of law and died in Fresno on February 21, 1952. He was interred in Belmont Memorial Park.

He is the maternal grandfather of famed film director Sam Peckinpah.

== Electoral history ==
United States House of Representatives elections, 1912
Party	Candidate	Votes	%
Democratic	Denver S. Church (inc.)	23,752	44.0
Republican	James C. Needham	22,994	42.7
Socialist	J. S. Cato	7,171	13.3
Total votes		53,917	100.0
Turnout			
Democratic hold			

United States House of Representatives elections, 1914
Party	Candidate	Votes	%
Democratic	Denver S. Church (inc.)	39,389	49.9
Republican	A. M. Drew	25,106	31.8
Socialist	Harry M. McKee	7,797	9.9
Prohibition	Don A. Allen	6,573	8.3
Total votes		78,865	100.0
Turnout			
Democratic hold			

United States House of Representatives elections, 1916
Party	Candidate	Votes	%
Democratic	Denver S. Church (inc.)	38,787	51.0
Republican	W. W. Phillips	27,676	36.4
Socialist	Harry M. McKee	5,492	7.2
Prohibition	J. F. Butler	4,042	5.3
Total votes		75,997	100.0
Turnout			
Democratic hold			

United States House of Representatives elections, 1932
Party	Candidate	Votes	%
Democratic	Denver S. Church	50,125	61.6
Republican	Henry E. Barbour (Incumbent)	31,209	38.4
Total votes		81,334	100.0
Turnout			
Democratic gain from Republican			

U.S. House of Representatives
Preceded by William D. Stephens	Member of the U.S. House of Representatives from California's 7th congressional district 1913–1919	Succeeded by Henry E. Barbour
Preceded by William E. Evans	Member of the U.S. House of Representatives from California's 9th congressional district 1933–1935	Succeeded by Bertrand W. Gearhart
