= Henry E. Barbour =

American politician

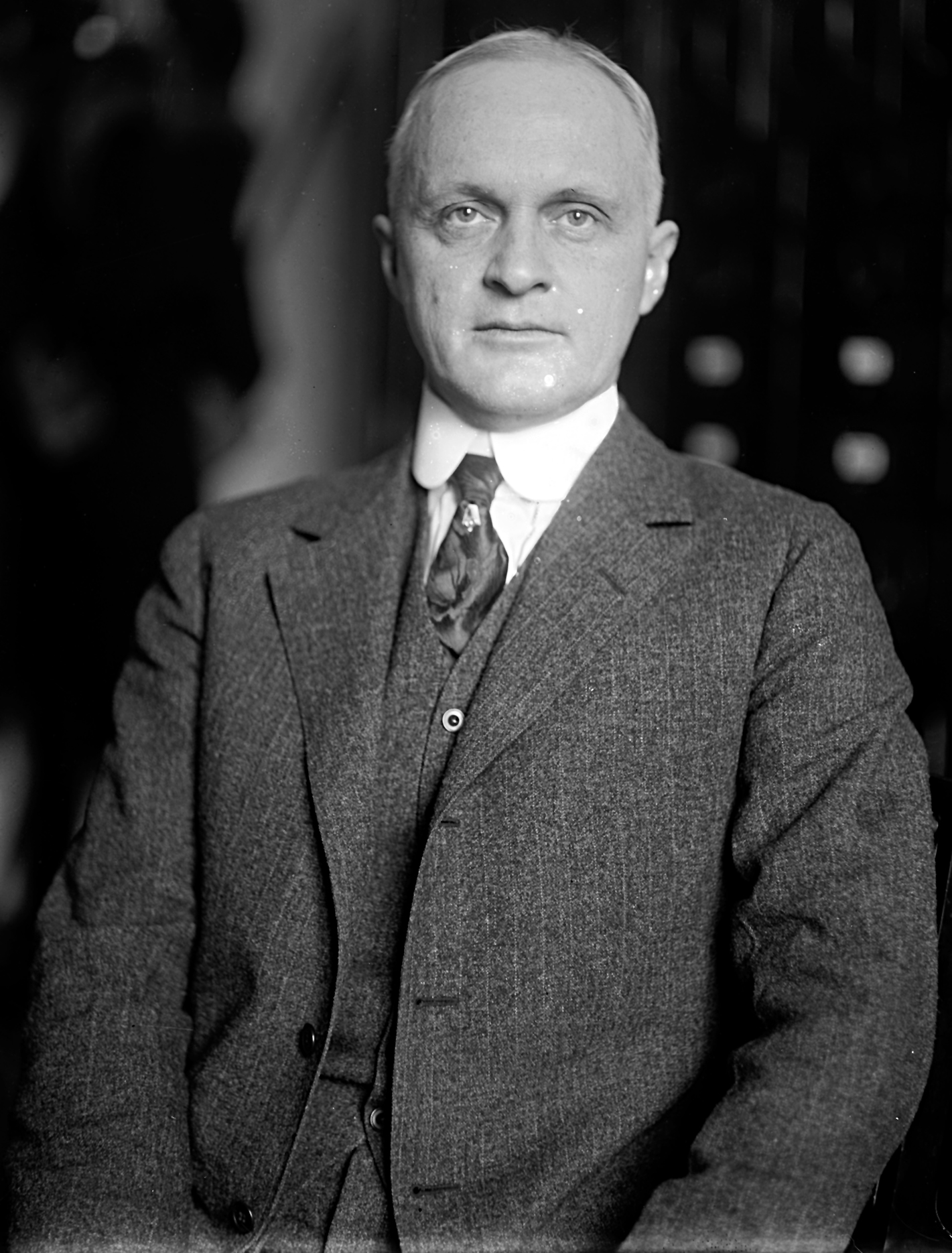

Member of the U.S. House of Representatives from California's 7th congressional district
- In office March 4, 1919 - March 3, 1933
- Preceded by: Denver S. Church
- Succeeded by: Ralph R. Eltse

Personal details
- Born: Henry Ellsworth Barbour; March 8, 1877 Ogdensburg, New York
- Died: March 21, 1945 (aged 68) Fresno, California
- Resting place: Belmont Memorial Park
- Education: Union College (B.D.); George Washington University (J.D.)

Henry Ellsworth Barbour (March 8, 1877 – March 21, 1945) was an American lawyer and politician who served seven terms as a U.S. representative from California from 1919 to 1933.

== Biography ==
Born in Ogdensburg, St. Lawrence County, New York, Barbour attended the public schools of his native city, the local "Free Academy" at Ogdensburg, Union College at Schenectady, New York, and the law department of George Washington University, Washington, D.C.

=== Legal career ===
He was admitted to the New York bar in 1901 and moved to Fresno, California, in 1902 to engage in the practice of law.

=== Congress ===
Barbour was elected as a Republican to the Sixty-sixth and to the six succeeding Congresses (March 4, 1919 – March 3, 1933). He was an unsuccessful candidate for reelection in 1932 to the Seventy-third Congress.

=== Later career and death ===
He resumed the practice of his profession in Fresno, California, where he died on March 21, 1945. He was interred in Belmont Memorial Park.

== Legacy ==
In the 1932 Republican primary for California's 7th Congressional District, Henry Barbour tied for the Republican nomination with Glenn M. Devore of Fresno, and won the nomination in an unprecedented drawing. Barbour later went on to lose the general election.

In 2018, an Arizona man discovered a collection of 200 letters that had belonged to Barbour, including two letters signed by President Hoover, White House invitations from President Harding, and an invitation to the groundbreaking ceremonies for the Golden Gate Bridge.

== Electoral results ==
United States House of Representatives elections, 1918
Party	Candidate	Votes	%
Republican	Henry E. Barbour	33,476	52.1
Democratic	Henry Hawson	30,745	47.9
Total votes		64,221	100.0
Turnout			
Republican gain from Democratic			

United States House of Representatives elections, 1920
Party	Candidate	Votes	%
Republican	Henry E. Barbour (incumbent)	57,647	87.2
Socialist	Harry M. McKee	8,449	12.8
Total votes		66,096	100.0
Turnout			
Republican hold			

United States House of Representatives elections, 1922
Party	Candidate	Votes	%
Republican	Henry E. Barbour (incumbent)	67,000	100.0
Turnout			
Republican hold			

United States House of Representatives elections, 1924
Party	Candidate	Votes	%
Republican	Henry E. Barbour (incumbent)	65,740	100.0
Turnout			
Republican hold			

United States House of Representatives elections, 1926
Party	Candidate	Votes	%
Republican	Henry E. Barbour (incumbent)	73,271	100.0
Turnout			
Republican hold			

United States House of Representatives elections, 1928
Party	Candidate	Votes	%
Republican	Henry E. Barbour (incumbent)	71,195	100.0
Turnout			
Republican hold			

United States House of Representatives elections, 1930
Party	Candidate	Votes	%
Republican	Henry E. Barbour (incumbent)	79,041	100.0
Turnout			
Republican hold			

U.S. House of Representatives
Preceded by Denver S. Church	Member of the U.S. House of Representatives from California's 7th congressional district 1919–1933	Succeeded by Ralph R. Eltse
