= National Federation of Music Clubs =

American non-profit philanthropic music organization

The National Federation of Music Clubs (NFMC) is an American non-profit philanthropic music organization that promotes American music, performers, and composers. NFMC endeavors to strengthen quality music education by supporting "high standards of musical creativity and performance." NFMC headquarters are located in Greenwood, Indiana. Since its founding in 1898, the NFMC has grown into one of the world's largest music organizations with club and individual members of all ages. The NFMC is chartered by the Congress of the United States, and is the only music organization member of the United Nations.

== History ==
The National Federation of Music Clubs was founded in 1898 and became an NGO member of the United Nations in 1949. It was chartered by the U.S. Congress in 1982.

=== Early timeline ===
1893: The first national assemblage of Women's Amateur Music Clubs – at the invitation of Rose Fay Thomas (née Rose Emily Fay; 1852), the second wife of Theodore Thomas, conductor of the Chicago Symphony – for a four-day festival at the World's Columbian Exposition in Chicago.
1897: A temporary organizational committee was formed.
1898: On January 26, 1898, at Steinway Hall in Chicago, Alice Uhl (née Alice Follett; 1844–1917) was elected first president. She was the wife of Edwin Fuller Uhl (1841–1901) of Grand Rapids, Michigan, former U.S. Ambassador to Germany.
1899: The First biennial Convention was held in St. Louis, May 3–6, 1899. Alice Uhl was re-elected president.
1901: Biennial Convention was held in Cleveland, April 30 to May 3, 1901; international music relations was stressed. First recorded Junior Club, sponsored by the Beethoven Club of Memphis, Tennessee.
1903: Biennial Convention was held in Rochester, New York.
1915: Beginning of Youth Artist Auditions, which became integral to the NFMC.
1916: The first state federation organization, affiliated with NFMC, was formed in Wisconsin. That same year, Michigan formed one.

== Mission and services ==
NFMC provides opportunities for musical study, performance and appreciation to more than 120,000 senior, student and junior members in 6,500 music-related clubs and organizations nationwide. Members are professional and amateur musicians, vocalists, composers, dancers, performing artists, arts and music educators, music students, music patrons and benefactors, and music lovers of all ages.

Dedicated to finding and fostering young musical talent, the NFMC conducts annual Junior Festivals with more than 117,000 participants. NFMC offers more than three quarters of a million dollars in state and national competitions (see competitions), including four $20,000 biennial Young Artist awards, and the $20,000 Ellis Award for Duo-Pianists. The Young Artist and Ellis Duo Piano awards include two years of performance bookings.

Federation members work to create a dynamic musical and cultural environment in their communities through education and sponsorship of musical events. The Federation champions American music with awards and commissions. Federated States proclaim November American Music Month, in which the annual Parade of American Music focuses on programs of music by American composers. Awards are given annually to recognize educational institutions for their promotion and presentation of American music.

Other areas of Federation interest include:

- Sponsoring of National Music Week, the first week of May each year
- Support for legislation on bills affecting the welfare of musicians, music education and development of American musical life
- Sponsors musical therapy programs in hospitals, nursing homes and prisons
- Provides opportunities for study and performance to musicians with disabilities and visual impairments
- Works with affiliated music and arts departments in hundreds of universities and colleges
- Promotes community awareness, support and involvement in the performing arts including opera, dance and poetry
- Campaigns for higher standards in church, radio and television music
- Encourages songs of our heritage through a Together We Sing program
- Aids and encourages music education in schools, public and private
- Recognizes and promotes outstanding American music and composers annually through programs such as American Music Month (November), Parade of American Music, Celebrate Strings (Previously named "Crusade for Strings"), Music Outreach, and the Emil and Ruth Beyer Composition Awards. With annual prize money totaling $11,000, the Beyer Awards are among the most significant awards given to young composers in the United States. Past winners include Eric Lindsay, Charlie Peck, Carl Schimmel, and Mischa Zupko.

== Leadership ==
- 1898–1900: Alice Uhl (née Alice Follett; 1844–1917), wife of Edwin Fuller Uhl (1841–1901)
- 1901–1903: Mrs. Curtis Webster
- 1903–1905: Mrs. Winifred B. Collins
- 1905: Mrs. Russell Ripley Dorr (née Sarah Louisa Bryan; 1852–1938)
- 1905–1907: Mrs. Julius Eugene Kinney
- 1907–1911: Mary Atwater Kelsey
- 1911–1915: Mrs. Julius Eugene Kinney
- 1915–1919: Mrs. Albert J. Ochsner
- 1919–1921: Mrs. Frank A. Seiberling
- 1921–1925: Mrs. John F. Lyons
- 1925–1929: Mrs. Edgar Stillman Kelley
- 1929–1933: Mrs. Elmer James Ottoway
- 1933–1937: Mrs. John Alexander Jardine
- 1937–1941: Mrs. Vincent Hilles Ober (Julia Fuqua Ober)
- 1941–1947: Mrs. Guy Patterson Gannett
- 1947–1951: Mrs. Royden James Keith (1886–1965) (Note: Marie Morrisey Keith, aka Mamie Keith, aka Mrs. Roy Keith (née Marie Louise Bosse; aka Bosseé; 1886–1965), formerly a contralto from Flatbush, Brooklyn, who also was, around 1938, President and Director of the Women's Symphony Orchestra of Chicago, and from 1947 to 1951, President of the National Federation of Music Clubs, through which, since 1952, an endowed Marie Morrisey Keith Scholarship is awarded every four years. She married twice, first, on November 16, 1910, in Flatbush, Brooklyn, to George Sims Morrisey (1878–1958); second, on June 12, 1020, in Egremont, Massachusetts, to Royden James Keith (1881–1955), a 1904 Stanford graduate and pioneer in phonograph business (see "The Bonnie Banks o' Loch Lomond" to hear a 1917 recording of her singing).)
- 1951–1955: Mrs. Ada Holding Miller
- 1955–1959: Mrs. Ronald Arthur Dougan
- 1959–1963: Mrs. C. Arthur Bullock
- 1963–1967: Mrs. Clifton J. Muir
- 1967–1971: Mrs. Maurice Honigman
- 1971–1975: Dr. Merle Montgomery
- 1975–1979: Mrs. Frank A. Vought
- 1979–1983: Mrs. Jack Christopher Ward
- 1983–1987: Mrs. Dwight De Losse Smith Robinson
- 1987–1991: Mrs. Glenn L. Brown
- 1991–1995: Virginia F. Allison (Mrs. D. Clifford)
- 1995–1999: Dr. Barbara M. Irish
- 1999–2003: Dr. Ouida Keck
- 2003–2007: Elizabeth Paris
- 2007–2011: Lana M. Bailey
- 2011–2015: Carolyn C Nelson
- 2015–2019: Michael Edwards
- 2019–2022: Frances Nelson
- 2022–present: Deborah Freeman

== State organizations ==
There are 45 State Federations with more than 120,000 Senior, Student/Collegiate, and Junior members in 5,000 federated clubs and organizations. Federated states are divided into five regions: Northeastern, Southeastern, North Central, South Central, and Western.

== Conventions/conferences ==
NFMC biennial conventions are held in the even years; Conferences are held biennially in the odd years.

== Publications ==
- Music Clubs (magazine), published 3 times a year.
- Junior Keynotes (magazine), published 3 times a year.

== Notable members ==
- Olivia Dudley Bucknam, first vice-president of the California Federation of Music Clubs and Cadman Creative Club
- Abigail Keasey Frankel, for eight years a member of National Federation of Music Clubs as Librarian, Secretary, and First Vice-president
- Laura E. Frenger, in 1928 elected president of the State Federation of Music Clubs
- Abbie Norton Jamison, composer, president of the California Federation of Music Clubs
- Marion Morrey Richter – the National Federation of Music Clubs sponsors the annual Marion Richter American Music Composition Award for promising student/collegiate composers
- Bell T. Ritchie, president of the California Federation of Music Clubs, which Bessie Bartlett Frankel helped to found
- Josephine Trott, upon her death in 1950 bequeathed the royalties from her books and music to the National Federation of Music Clubs to fund the Josephine Trott Memorial Scholarship Fund
- Constance Walton – composer, won the National Federation of Music Clubs Adult Composer Award in 1977
- Bessie Marshall Whitely – composer, whose opera Hiawatha's Childhood won the National Federation of Music Clubs award in 1912
- Mary Wiggins – composer and educator, who received an award from the National Federation of Music Clubs in 1973
- Glad Robinson Youseen dashesthe National Federation of Music Clubs sponsors the biennial Glad Robinson Youse Adult Composers Contest
