= Mary Atwater Kelsey =

American clubwoman

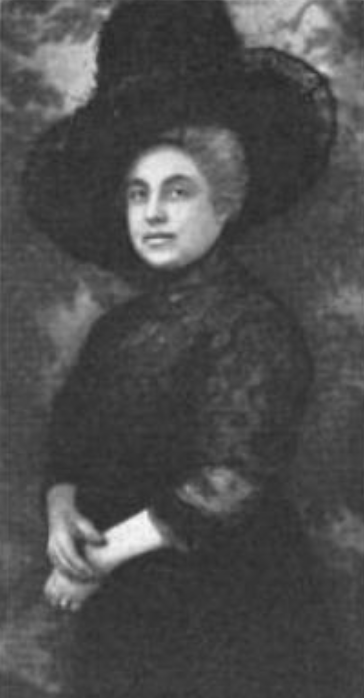
- Mary Atwater Kelsey, from a 1915 publication
- Born: Mary A. Atwater; February 6, 1860; Grand Rapids, Michigan
- Died: August 24, 1915 (aged 55); Grand Rapids, Michigan
- Occupation: Clubwoman
- Known for: President of the National Federation of Music Clubs

Mary Atwater Kelsey (February 6, 1860 – August 24, 1915), usually known socially as Mrs. Charles B. Kelsey, was an American clubwoman. She served two terms as president of the National Federation of Music Clubs.

== Early life ==
Mary Atwater was born in Grand Rapids, Michigan, the daughter of Luman R. Atwater and Ann Farnsworth Atwater. Her father was a businessman.

== Career ==
Kelsey was a church organist in Grand Rapids. From 1898 to 1902 she was president of the St. Cecilia Society of Grand Rapids, which she helped to organize in 1883. She welcomed the National American Woman Suffrage Association (NAWSA) to Grand Rapids in 1899. She was also chair of the Civic Music Committee of Grand Rapids. She took particular interest in bringing musical performances to disadvantaged audiences, including disabled veterans, prisoners, orphans, factory workers, and residents of the local "poor farm".

Kelsey was president of the National Federal of Music Clubs (NFMC) for two terms, elected in 1907, and re-elected in 1909. During her presidency, the number of local clubs doubled, and a vice president was appointed for each state; the NFMC also established prizes for living American composers. After her active presidency, she attended British meetings of music clubs representing the NFMC.

== Personal life ==
Mary Atwater married banker Charles Bert Kelsey in 1888. They had a daughter, Ann, born in 1897. She died in 1915, in Grand Rapids, five weeks after suffering a stroke in San Francisco, where she was visiting the Panama–Pacific International Exposition with her daughter. She was 55 years old. Her music library was donated to the Grand Rapids Public Library.
