= Ralph R. Eltse =

American politician

Ralph W.R. Eltse
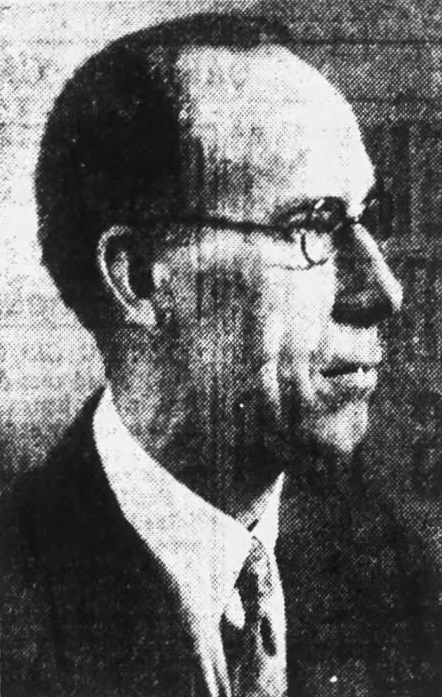
- Ralph W.R. Eltse, California congressman

Member of the U.S. House of Representatives from California's 7th district
- In office March 4, 1933 – January 3, 1935
- Preceded by: Henry E. Barbour
- Succeeded by: John H. Tolan

Personal details
- Born: Ralph William Roscoe Eltse; September 13, 1885 Oskaloosa, Iowa, U.S.
- Died: March 18, 1971 (aged 85) Berkeley, California, U.S.
- Resting place: Sunset Mausoleum
- Party: Republican

Ralph William Roscoe Eltse (September 13, 1885 – March 18, 1971) was an American lawyer and politician who served one term as a U.S. representative from California from 1933 to 1935.

== Biography ==
Eltse was born in Oskaloosa, Iowa. He attended the public schools and graduated from Penn College (now William Penn University) in Oskaloosa in 1909 and from Haverford (Pennsylvania) College in 1910. He moved to Berkeley, California in 1912. He attended the law department of the University of California at Berkeley.

=== Early career ===
He was admitted to the bar in 1915 and commenced practice in Berkeley. He served as a member of the Republican State committee from 1932 to 1935, and was a delegate to the Republican State conventions in 1932, 1934, and 1940.

=== Congress ===
Eltse was elected as a Republican to the Seventy-third Congress (March 4, 1933 – January 3, 1935). He was an unsuccessful candidate for re-election in 1934 to the Seventy-fourth Congress and for election in 1940 to the Seventy-seventh Congress.

=== Later career and death ===
He resumed the practice of law, and resided in Berkeley until his death on March 18, 1971. He was entombed in Sunset Mausoleum.

== Electoral history ==
United States House of Representatives elections, 1932
Party	Candidate	Votes	%
Republican	Ralph R. Eltse	45,944	45.5
Democratic	Frank V. Cornish	32,365	32.0
Socialist	J. Stitt Wilson	22,767	22.5
Total votes		101,076	100.0
Turnout			
Republican win (new seat)			

United States House of Representatives elections, 1934
Party	Candidate	Votes	%
Democratic	John H. Tolan	51,962	52.3
Republican	Ralph R. Eltse (incumbent)	47,414	47.7
Total votes		99,376	100.0
Turnout			
Democratic gain from Republican			

U.S. House of Representatives
Preceded by Henry E. Barbour	Member of the U.S. House of Representatives from California's 7th congressional district 1933–1935	Succeeded by John H. Tolan
