= Jeffery Cohelan =

American politician

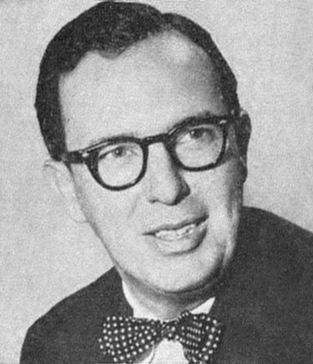

Member of the U.S. House of Representatives from California's 7th district
- In office January 3, 1959 – January 3, 1971
- Preceded by: John J. Allen Jr.
- Succeeded by: Ronald V. Dellums

Personal details
- Born: June 24, 1914 San Francisco, California
- Died: February 15, 1999 (aged 84) Washington, D.C.
- Party: Democratic
- Education: San Mateo Junior College; University of California, Berkeley B.A. economics 1950 (with honors); Leeds University; Oxford University
- Awards: Fulbright scholar at Leeds and Oxford universities in 1953-54

Jeffery Cohelan (June 24, 1914 – February 15, 1999) was an American politician who served six terms as a United States representative from California from 1959 to 1971.

== Biography ==
He was born in San Francisco, California and attended the public schools and San Mateo Junior College. He earned his B.A. from the University of California, Berkeley in Economics in 1950. He was a Fulbright research scholar at Leeds and Oxford Universities in England in 1953 and 1954.

=== Early career ===
He worked driving a milk truck from 1935, and was the secretary-treasurer (1942–~1958) of the Milk Drivers and Dairy Employees, Local 302, Alameda and Contra Costa Counties. In the 1958 election, he campaigned from a milk truck and was elected to Congress. He was a consultant to the University of California Institute of Industrial Relations.

Cohelan was a member of the Berkeley Welfare Commission from 1949 to 1953, the Berkeley City Council from 1955 to 1958, and the San Francisco Council on Foreign Relations.

=== Congress ===
He was elected as a Democrat to the Eighty-sixth and to the five succeeding Congresses, from 1959 to 1971. He was known as a Johnson liberal for his support of progressive programs, but also American involvement in the Vietnam War.

In 1966, he faced a tough primary challenge from Ramparts magazine editor Robert Scheer, who was supported by local activists from the civil-rights and emerging anti-war movement.

His previous support for the war helped lead to Cohelan's defeat in the 1970 primary by Berkeley City Councilman Ron Dellums, who won the race and the general election to begin a long tenure in Congress.

=== Later career ===
From 1970-1979, Cohelan was executive director of a trade association of health maintenance organizations, Group Health Association of America.

=== Retirement and death ===
After retirement Cohelan resided in Washington, D.C., where he enjoyed cooking and sang in the All Saints Episcopal Church choir. He died at his home in Washington on February 15, 1999.

== Archives ==
The University of Oklahoma has papers from his congressional office.

== Electoral history ==
United States House of Representatives elections, 1958
Party	Candidate	Votes	%
Democratic	Jeffery Cohelan	65,699	50.9
Republican	John J. Allen, Jr. (incumbent)	63,270	49.1
Total votes		128,969	100.0
Turnout			
Democratic gain from Republican			

United States House of Representatives elections, 1960
Party	Candidate	Votes	%
Democratic	Jeffery Cohelan (incumbent)	79,776	57.1
Republican	Lewis F. Sherman	60,065	42.9
Total votes		139,841	100.0
Turnout			
Democratic hold			

United States House of Representatives elections, 1962
Party	Candidate	Votes	%
Democratic	Jeffery Cohelan (incumbent)	86,215	64.5
Republican	Leonard L. Cantando	47,409	35.5
Total votes		133,624	100.0
Turnout			
Democratic hold			

United States House of Representatives elections, 1964
Party	Candidate	Votes	%
Democratic	Jeffery Cohelan (incumbent)	100,901	66.1
Republican	Lawrence E. McNutt	51,675	33.9
Total votes		192,576	100.0
Turnout			
Democratic hold			

United States House of Representatives elections, 1966
Party	Candidate	Votes	%
Democratic	Jeffery Cohelan (incumbent)	84,644	64.4
Republican	Malcolm M. Champlin	46,763	35.6
Total votes		131,407	100.0
Turnout			
Democratic hold			

United States House of Representatives elections, 1968
Party	Candidate	Votes	%
Democratic	Jeffery Cohelan (incumbent)	102,108	62.9
Republican	Barney E. Hilburn	48,133	29.6
Peace and Freedom	Huey P. Newton	12,164	7.5
Total votes		162,405	100.0
Turnout			
Democratic hold			

United States House of Representatives elections, 1970
Party	Candidate	Votes	%
Democratic	Ron Dellums	89,784	57.3
Republican	John E. Healy	64,691	41.3
Peace and Freedom	Sarah Scahill	2,156	1.4
Total votes		156,631	100
Turnout			
Democratic hold			

U.S. House of Representatives
Preceded by John J. Allen Jr.	Member of the U.S. House of Representatives from California's 7th congressional district 1959–1971	Succeeded by Ron Dellums
