= John J. Allen Jr. =

American politician (1899–1995)

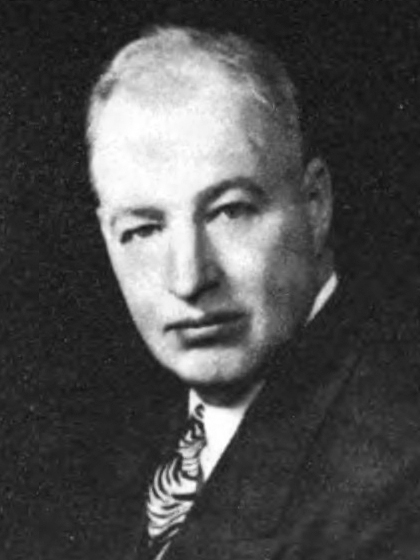

Member of the U.S. House of Representatives from California's 7th district
- In office January 3, 1947 – January 3, 1959
- Preceded by: John H. Tolan
- Succeeded by: Jeffery Cohelan

Under Secretary of Commerce for Transportation
- In office January 5, 1959 – January 20, 1961
- Preceded by: Louis S. Rothschild
- Succeeded by: Clarence D. Martin Jr.

Member and President of the Oakland Board of Education
- In office 1923–1943

Mayor of McCall, Idaho
- In office 1988–1992

Personal details
- Born: November 27, 1899 Oakland, California, U.S.
- Died: March 7, 1995 (aged 95) McCall, Idaho, U.S.
- Party: Republican
- Education: University of California, Berkeley
- Occupation: Attorney, politician

Military service
- Allegiance: United States
- Branch/service: United States Navy
- Years of service: 1942–1945
- Rank: Lieutenant Commander
- Battles/wars: World War I World War II

John Joseph Allen Jr. (November 27, 1899 – March 7, 1995) was the U.S. representative from California's 7th congressional district from January 3, 1947, to January 3, 1959. He is the last Republican to represent Oakland and Berkeley in Congress.

He served as Under Secretary of Commerce for Transportation under President Dwight D. Eisenhower from 1959 to 1961, helping to lay the groundwork for the future Department of Transportation.

He retired to McCall, Idaho in 1970, where he later served as mayor from 1988 to 1992. During this time he was America's oldest mayor.

== Early life and education ==
John J. Allen Jr. was born to John J. Allen Sr., an Alameda County Judge, in Oakland, California, on November 27, 1899.

Allen Jr. graduated from public high school and while studying at Berkeley joined the United States Navy as an Apprentice seaman during World War I.

== Career ==
After graduating from UC Berkeley School of Law in 1922, Allen Jr. was admitted to the California State Bar and commenced practice. Between 1923 and 1943 Allen Jr. served as a member of the Oakland Board of Education, serving several terms as president. He also served as the President of the California State School Trustees Association from 1936 to 1938, and as a member of the County Republican Central Committee from 1936 to 1944.

In 1942, during World War II, Allen Jr. returned to the Navy, this time serving as a Lieutenant commander. He was discharged in 1945.

After his military service, Allen Jr. served as the vice-chairman for the State Commission on School Districts, and in 1946 ran for Congress in California's 7th Congressional District after the retirement of Democratic Congressman John H. Tolan. Allen Jr. beat Democrat Patrick W. McDonough by 13,520 votes. In 1952 Allen won both the Republican and Democratic nominations for the House. He focused on Merchant Marine and Fisheries bills and was successful with bills to provide an interstate fishing compact among the Pacific states and to amend the Ship Mortgage Act of 1920. Allen voted in favor of the Civil Rights Act of 1957.

After his unsuccessful re-election bid, Allen Jr. was appointed as the Under Secretary of Commerce for Transportation on January 5, 1959, serving until 1961.

=== Later life ===
After his political career ended in 1961, John J. Allen Jr. resumed the practice of law until his retirement in 1969. He resided in McCall, Idaho, and at the age of 87 he was elected Mayor of McCall, serving until 1992.

== Electoral history ==
United States House of Representatives elections, 1946
Party	Candidate	Votes	%
Republican	John J. Allen, Jr.	61,508	56.2
Democratic	Patrick W. McDonough	47,988	43.8
Total votes		109,496	100.0
Turnout			
Republican gain from Democratic			

United States House of Representatives elections, 1948
Party	Candidate	Votes	%
Republican	John J. Allen, Jr. (incumbent)	78,534	51.4
Democratic	Buell G. Gallagher	74,318	48.6
Total votes		152,852	100.0
Turnout			
Republican hold			

United States House of Representatives elections, 1950
Party	Candidate	Votes	%
Republican	John J. Allen, Jr. (incumbent)	74,069	55.3
Democratic	Lyle E. Cook	59,976	44.7
Total votes		134,045	100.0
Turnout			
Republican hold			

United States House of Representatives elections, 1952
Party	Candidate	Votes	%
Republican	John J. Allen, Jr. (incumbent)	120,666	84.3
Progressive	John Allen Johnson	22,408	15.7
Total votes		142,074	100.0
Turnout			
Republican hold			

United States House of Representatives elections, 1954
Party	Candidate	Votes	%
Republican	John J. Allen, Jr. (incumbent)	64,083	53
Democratic	Stanley K. Crook	56,807	47
Total votes		120,890	100
Turnout			
Republican hold			

United States House of Representatives elections, 1956
Party	Candidate	Votes	%
Republican	John J. Allen, Jr. (incumbent)	75,932	52.8
Democratic	Laurance L. Cross	67,931	47.2
Total votes		143,863	100.0
Turnout			
Republican hold			

United States House of Representatives elections, 1958
Party	Candidate	Votes	%
Democratic	Jeffery Cohelan	65,699	50.9
Republican	John J. Allen, Jr. (incumbent)	63,270	49.1
Total votes		128,969	100.0
Turnout			
Democratic gain from Republican			

U.S. House of Representatives
Preceded by John H. Tolan	Member of the U.S. House of Representatives from California's 7th congressional district 1947–1959	Succeeded by Jeffery Cohelan
