= Charles W. Fisher (American politician) =

American politician

Member of the California State Assembly from the 18th district
- In office January 2, 1933 - January 4, 1937
- Preceded by: Edwin H. Zion
- Succeeded by: Henry A. Dannenbrink

Member of the California State Assembly from the 41st district
- In office January 5, 1931 - January 2, 1933
- Preceded by: Albert Henry Morgan Jr.
- Succeeded by: Rodney L. Turner

Personal details
- Born: Charles Wilson Fisher; February 10, 1896 Oakland, California, US
- Died: January 7, 1981 (aged 84) Monterey, California, US
- Party: Republican
- Spouse: Elsie Leicester (m. 1925)
- Parent(s): Phillip M. Fisher; Anna Katrina Laumeister

Military service
- Branch/service: United States Army
- Battles/wars: World War I

Charles Wilson Fisher (February 10, 1896 – January 7, 1981) was an American lawyer, politician and World War I Army veteran. He served in the California legislature and unsuccessfully ran for the House of Representatives.

== Background ==
Charles Wilson Fisher was born on February 10, 1896, in Oakland, California, to Phillip M. and Anna Katrina (Laumeister) Fisher. He served in the United States Army during World War I. In 1922, he graduated from the UC Hastings College of Law with a Bachelor of Laws degree. He was admitted to the bar the same year. On November 18, 1925, he married Elsie Allen Leicester. He was on the Oakland Free Library Board of Directors from 1927 to 1937, and was also the president of it from 1928-29.

== State Legislature ==
Fisher was first elected to the California State Assembly in 1930, representing the 41st district from 1931 to 1933 and the 18th district from 1933 to 1937. In 1938, he decided to run for the House of Representatives for California's 7th district, but lost to incumbent John H. Tolan. Fisher died on January 7, 1981, in Monterey, California.
