= Constance Walton =

American composer, pianist, and teacher

Constance Williams Walton (30 June 1919 – 22 July 2017) was an American composer, pianist, and teacher.

Walton was born in California to Milo B. and Helen W. Williams. She graduated from the Philadelphia Conservatory of Music and married Donald Rech Walton on June 14, 1941. They had one son, Robert, before divorcing in November 1965.

While teaching in Old Greenwich, Connecticut, Walton served as chair of the National Federation of Music Clubs' Northeastern Region.

== Awards ==
- National Opera Association Award (1972)
- National Federation of Music Clubs Adult Composer Award (1977)
- Greenwich Pen Women OWL Award (1992)

== Compositions ==
Walton's compositions included:

=== Chamber ===
- Bare Branches (flute, viola and cello)
- Perspective (cello and piano)
- Shadows (viola and cello)

=== Piano ===
- Duo Dimensions (two pianos)
- Three Designs for Piano

=== Vocal ===
- "Four Little Songs"
- Songs
