= Joe Jenkins (baseball) =

American baseball player (1890–1974)

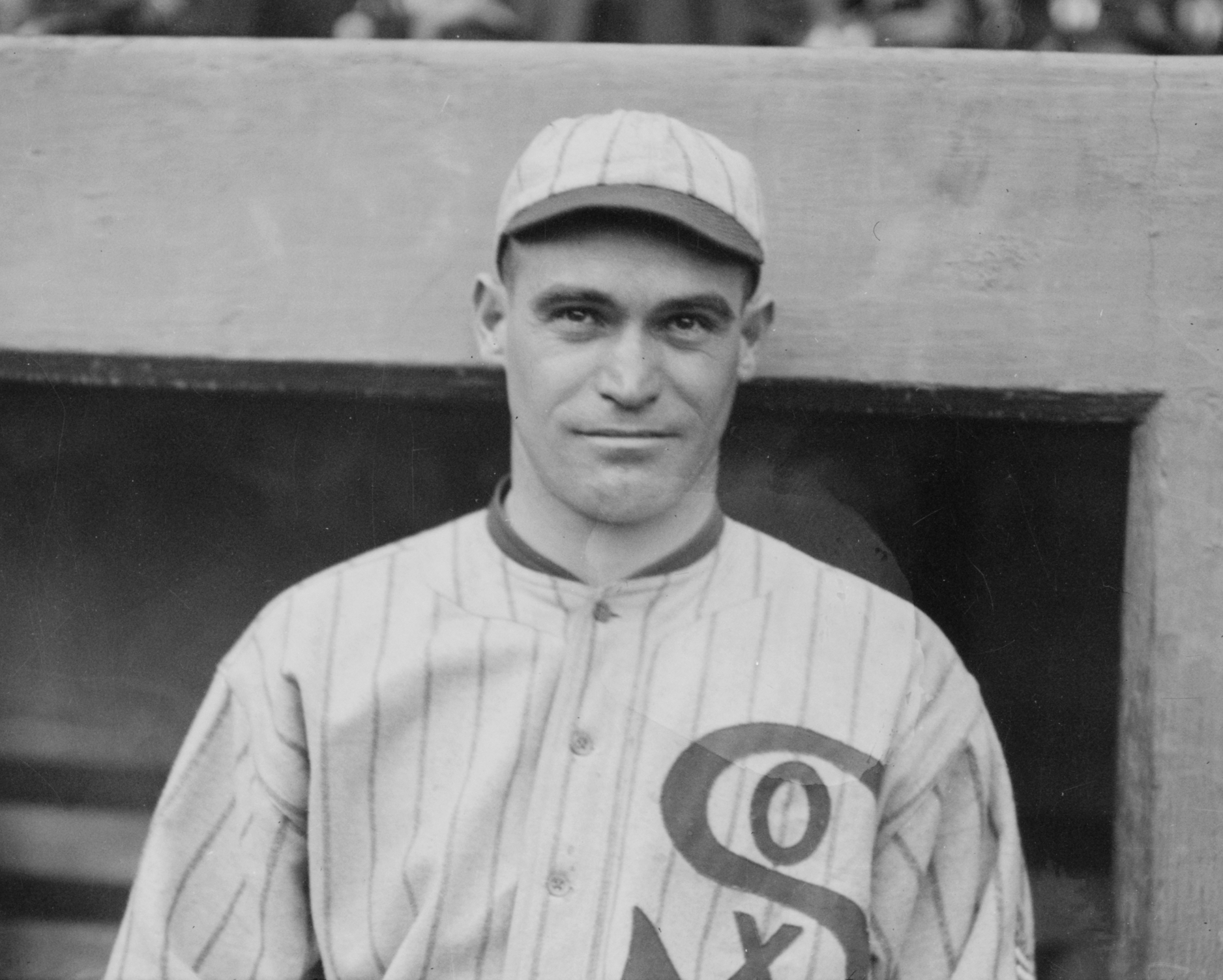
- Jenkins in 1917
- Catcher
- Born: October 12, 1890; Shelbyville, Tennessee, U.S.
- Died: June 21, 1974 (aged 83); Fresno, California, U.S.
- Batted: Right Threw: Right

MLB debut
- April 30, 1914, for the St. Louis Browns

Last MLB appearance
- September 27, 1919, for the Chicago White Sox

MLB statistics
- Batting average: .133
- Home runs: 0
- Runs batted in: 3
- Stats at Baseball Reference

Teams
- St. Louis Browns (1914); Chicago White Sox (1917, 1919)

Career highlights and awards
- World Series champion (1917)

Joseph Daniel Jenkins (October 12, 1890 – June 21, 1974) was an American right-handed Major League Baseball catcher who played for the St. Louis Browns in 1914 and the Chicago White Sox in 1917 and 1919.

Jenkins was born in Shelbyville, Tennessee, and made his major league debut on April 30, 1914. He played 19 games with the Browns that year, hitting .125 in 32 at-bats. In 1917, with the White Sox, Jenkins hit .111 in nine at-bats. In 1919, his final season, he hit .158 in 19 at-bats. He played his final game on September 27 of that year. Jenkins did not appear in either the 1917 or 1919 World Series for the White Sox.

Overall, Jenkins played three seasons in the big leagues, hitting .133 in 40 games (60 at-bats). He had two doubles, one triple, and three RBI.

Though his big league career was over after 1919, Jenkins toiled in the minor leagues until 1930, when he was 39 years old. He spent seven of those years in the Pacific Coast League. In 1923, with the Salt Lake City Bees, he hit .350 with 23 doubles and nine home runs.

Following his death in Fresno, California, Jenkins was interred at Belmont Memorial Park in Fresno.
