= Bessie Bartlett Frankel =

American concert singer, composer and clubwoman

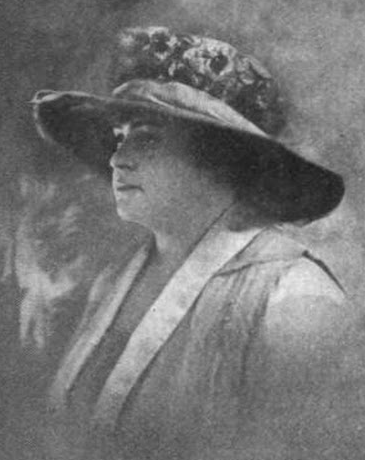
Bessie Bartlett Frankel, from a 1920 publication.

Bessie Bartlett Frankel (April 29, 1884 – September 15, 1959) was an American concert singer, composer, and clubwoman, and the first president of the California Federation of Music Clubs.

== Early life ==
Bessie Herbert Bartlett was born in Los Angeles, California, the daughter of Albert Griffith Bartlett and Mary Ann McKeeby Bartlett. Her father was a cornettist and band leader; he ran a music store in Hollywood, and invited well-known musicians to Los Angeles to perform. Their home was located where the Pantages Theatre now stands. She studied music at the Cumnock School of Expression and in New York with David Bispham and Herbert Witherspoon. She went abroad to study opera with Carlo Sebastiani.

== Career ==
Bartlett was president of the Women's Committee of the Los Angeles Philharmonic. She organized the Chamber of Music Series held at Scripps College, and the Hollywood Community Chorus, among her many projects intended to support community music programming in southern California. She was president of the American Music Optimists of Los Angeles, taking up the work "with her customary zeal".

She was the first president of the California Federation of Music Clubs when it formed in 1918; she also wrote a pamphlet on the history of the Federation. With the Federation's backing, she worked to foster patriotic community singing, in the schools, movie houses, and theaters of Los Angeles, during World War I and afterwards. She was also first vice president of the National Federation of Music Clubs, and helped launch other state and local chapters across the United States. "Music can hardly be considered in the category of amusements," she declared in a 1918 letter. "It is more of an educational force."

Frankel was also a composer of songs, especially settings for poetry and songs for children.

== Personal life ==
Bessie Bartlett married insurance executive and cellist Cecil Frankel in 1911. She died in 1959, aged 75 years, in Santa Monica, California. There is a Frankel Hall at Scripps College named for Bessie and Cecil Frankel, and the Bessie Bartlett Frankel Chamber Music Festival concerts occur at Scripps. The Bessie Bartlett Frankel Collection of Travel and Early Los Angeles Music is housed at the Ella Strong Denison Library, Scripps College. Scripps College and UCLA both hold collections of Frankel's personal papers.
