= 2000 United States House of Representatives elections in California =

- November 7, 2000

All 52 California seats to the United States House of Representatives
	Majority party	Minority party
Party	Democratic	Republican
Last election	28	24
Seats before	27	25
Seats won	32	20
Seat change	▲5	▼5
Popular vote	5,405,002	4,446,295
Percentage	51.79%	42.60%
Swing	▲0.38pp	▼1.3pp
- Results: Democratic hold Democratic gain Republican hold

The United States House of Representatives elections in California, 2000 was an election for California's delegation to the United States House of Representatives, which occurred as part of the general election of the House of Representatives on November 7, 2000. Democrats gained five seats, one of which was held by Matthew G. Martinez who switched to the Republican Party after being defeated in the Democratic primary, expanding their majority in California's delegation.

== Overview ==
United States House of Representatives elections in California, 2000
Party	Votes	%	Before	After	+/–
Democratic	5,405,002	51.79%	27	32	+5
Republican	4,446,295	42.60%	25	20	-5
Libertarian	278,472	2.67%	0	0	0
Natural Law	228,273	2.19%	0	0	0
Green	37,952	0.36%	0	0	0
Reform	33,311	0.32%	0	0	0
American Independent	7,474	0.07%	0	0	0
Write-ins	518	0.00%	0	0	0
Invalid or blank votes	649,440	5.86%	—	—	—
Totals	11,086,737	100.00%	52	52	—

Final results from the Secretary of State of California:

== District 1 ==
2000 California's 1st congressional district election
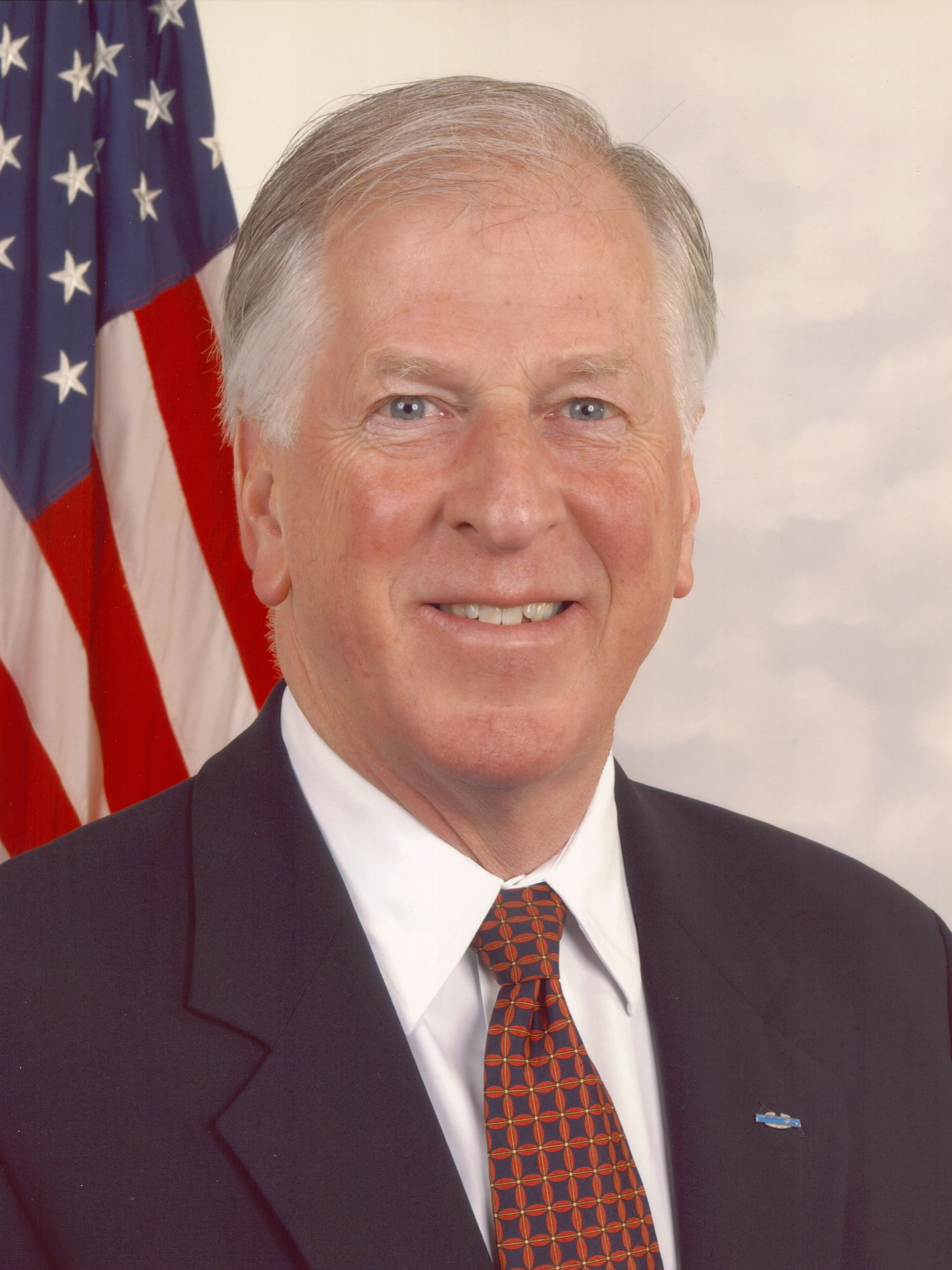

Nominee	Mike Thompson	Russel J. "Jim" Chase
Party	Democratic	Republican
Popular vote	155,638	66,987
Percentage	65.0%	28.0%
- County results Thompson: 50–60% 60–70%
U.S. Representative before election
Mike Thompson
Democratic
Elected U.S. Representative
Mike Thompson
Democratic

California's 1st congressional district election, 2000
Party	Candidate	Votes	%
Democratic	Mike Thompson (incumbent)	155,638	65.03
Republican	Russel J. "Jim" Chase	66,987	27.99
Natural Law	Cheryl Kreier	7,173	3.00
Libertarian	Emil P. Rossi	6,376	2.66
Reform	Pamela Elizondo	3,161	1.32
Invalid or blank votes		11,818	4.71
Total votes		251,153	100.00
Turnout			
Democratic hold			

== District 2 ==
2000 California's 2nd congressional district election
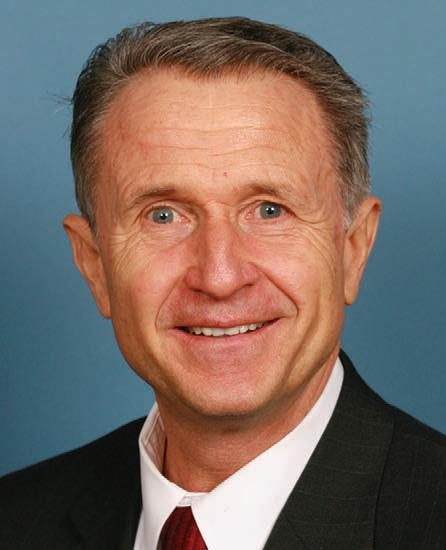

Nominee	Wally Herger	Stan Morgan
Party	Republican	Democratic
Popular vote	168,172	72,075
Percentage	65.7%	28.2%
- County results Herger: 60–70% 70–80%
U.S. Representative before election
Wally Herger
Republican
Elected U.S. Representative
Wally Herger
Republican

California's 2nd congressional district election, 2000
Party	Candidate	Votes	%
Republican	Wally Herger (incumbent)	168,172	65.73
Democratic	Stan Morgan	72,075	28.17
Natural Law	John McDermott	8,910	3.48
Libertarian	Charles R. Martin	6,699	2.62
Invalid or blank votes		7,130	2.71
Total votes		262,986	100.00
Turnout			
Republican hold			

== District 3 ==
2000 California's 3rd congressional district election
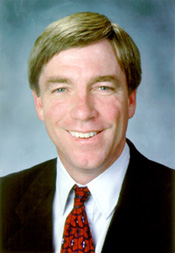

Nominee	Doug Ose	Bob Kent
Party	Republican	Democratic
Popular vote	129,254	93,067
Percentage	56.1%	40.4%
- County results Ose: 50–60% 60–70% Kent: 50–60%
U.S. Representative before election
Doug Ose
Republican
Elected U.S. Representative
Doug Ose
Republican

California's 3rd congressional district election, 2000
Party	Candidate	Votes	%
Republican	Doug Ose (incumbent)	129,254	56.15
Democratic	Bob Kent	93,067	40.43
Libertarian	Douglas Arthur Tuma	5,227	2.27
Natural Law	Channing E. Jones	2,634	1.14
Invalid or blank votes		4,309	1.84
Total votes		234,491	100.00
Turnout			
Republican hold			

== District 4 ==
2000 California's 4th congressional district election
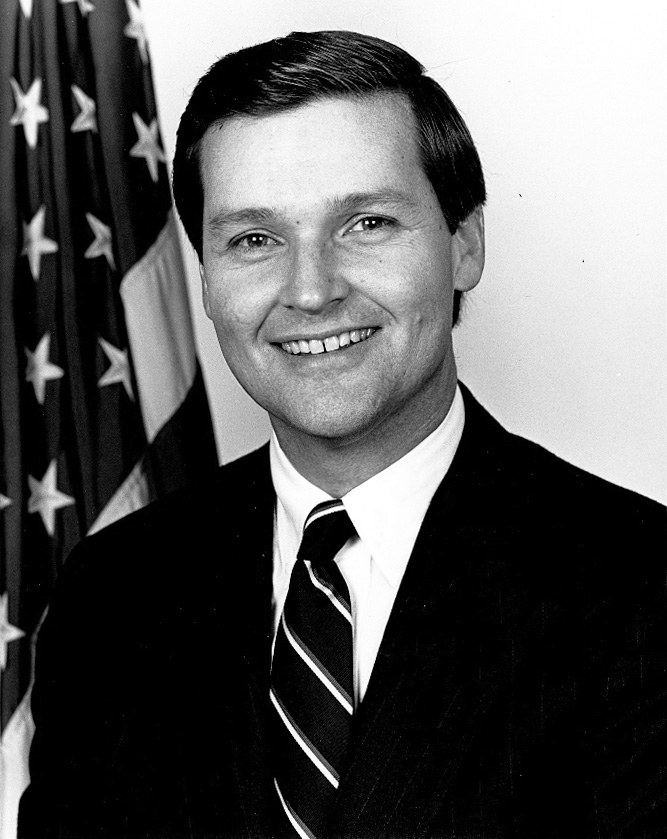

Nominee	John Doolittle	Mark A. Norberg
Party	Republican	Democratic
Popular vote	197,503	97,974
Percentage	63.4%	31.5%
- County results Doolittle: 50–60% 60–70%
U.S. Representative before election
John Doolittle
Republican
Elected U.S. Representative
John Doolittle
Republican

California's 4th congressional district election, 2000
Party	Candidate	Votes	%
Republican	John Doolittle (incumbent)	197,503	63.42
Democratic	Mark A. Norberg	97,974	31.46
Libertarian	William Fritz Frey	9,494	3.05
Natural Law	Robert E. Ray	6,452	2.07
Invalid or blank votes		4,506	1.43
Total votes		315,929	100.00
Turnout			
Republican hold			

== District 5 ==
2000 California's 5th congressional district election
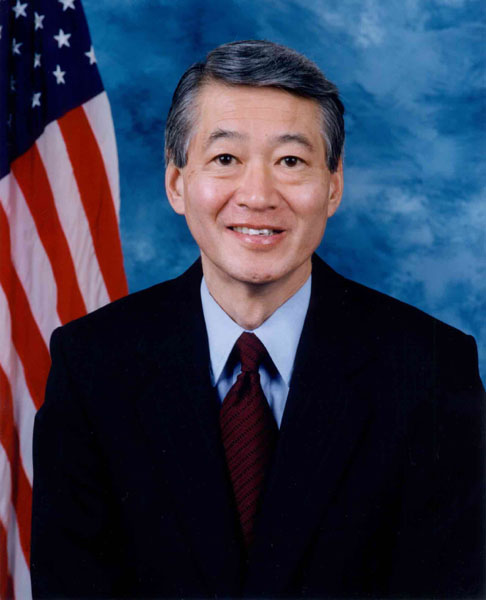

Nominee	Robert Matsui	Ken Payne
Party	Democratic	Republican
Popular vote	147,025	55,945
Percentage	68.1%	25.9%
- County results Matsui: 60–70%
U.S. Representative before election
Robert Matsui
Democratic
Elected U.S. Representative
Robert Matsui
Democratic

California's 5th congressional district election, 2000
Party	Candidate	Votes	%
Democratic	Robert Matsui (incumbent)	147,025	68.13
Republican	Ken Payne	55,945	25.92
Green	Ken Adams	6,195	2.87
Libertarian	Cullene Lang	3,746	1.74
Natural Law	Alan Barreca	2,894	1.34
Invalid or blank votes		0	0.00
Total votes		215,805	100.00
Turnout			
Democratic hold			

== District 6 ==
2000 California's 6th congressional district election
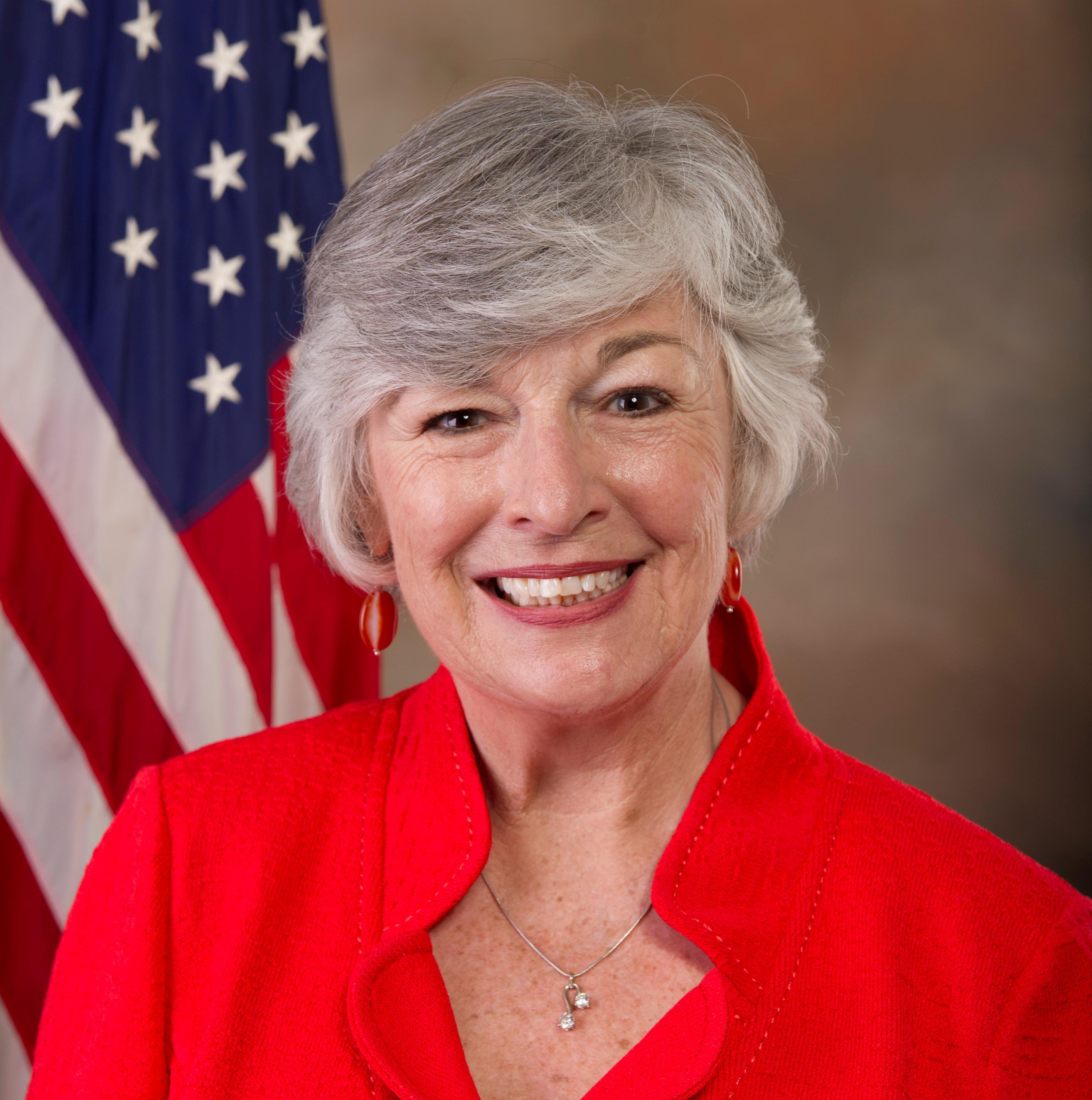

Nominee	Lynn Woolsey	Ken McAuliffe
Party	Democratic	Republican
Popular vote	182,116	80,169
Percentage	64.3%	28.3%
- County results Woolsey: 60–70%
U.S. Representative before election
Lynn Woolsey
Democratic
Elected U.S. Representative
Lynn Woolsey
Democratic

California's 6th congressional district election, 2000
Party	Candidate	Votes	%
Democratic	Lynn Woolsey (incumbent)	182,116	64.33
Republican	Ken McAuliffe	80,169	28.32
Green	Justin "Justo" Moscoso	13,248	4.68
Libertarian	Richard O. Barton	4,691	1.66
Natural Law	Alan Barreca	2,894	1.02
Invalid or blank votes		11,775	3.99
Total votes		294,893	100.00
Turnout			
Democratic hold			

== District 7 ==
2000 California's 7th congressional district election
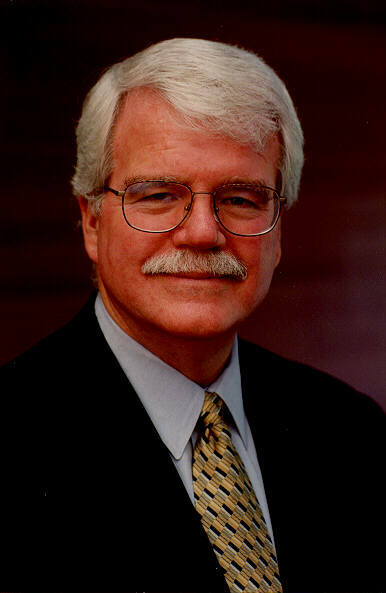

Nominee	George Miller	Christopher A. Hoffman
Party	Democratic	Republican
Popular vote	159,692	44,154
Percentage	76.5%	21.1%
- County results Miller: 70–80%
U.S. Representative before election
George Miller
Democratic
Elected U.S. Representative
George Miller
Democratic

California's 7th congressional district election, 2000
Party	Candidate	Votes	%
Democratic	George Miller (incumbent)	159,692	76.48
Republican	Christopher A. Hoffman	44,154	21.15
Natural Law	Martin Sproul	4,943	2.37
Invalid or blank votes		9,361	4.29
Total votes		218,150	100.00
Turnout			
Democratic hold			

== District 8 ==
2000 California's 8th congressional district election
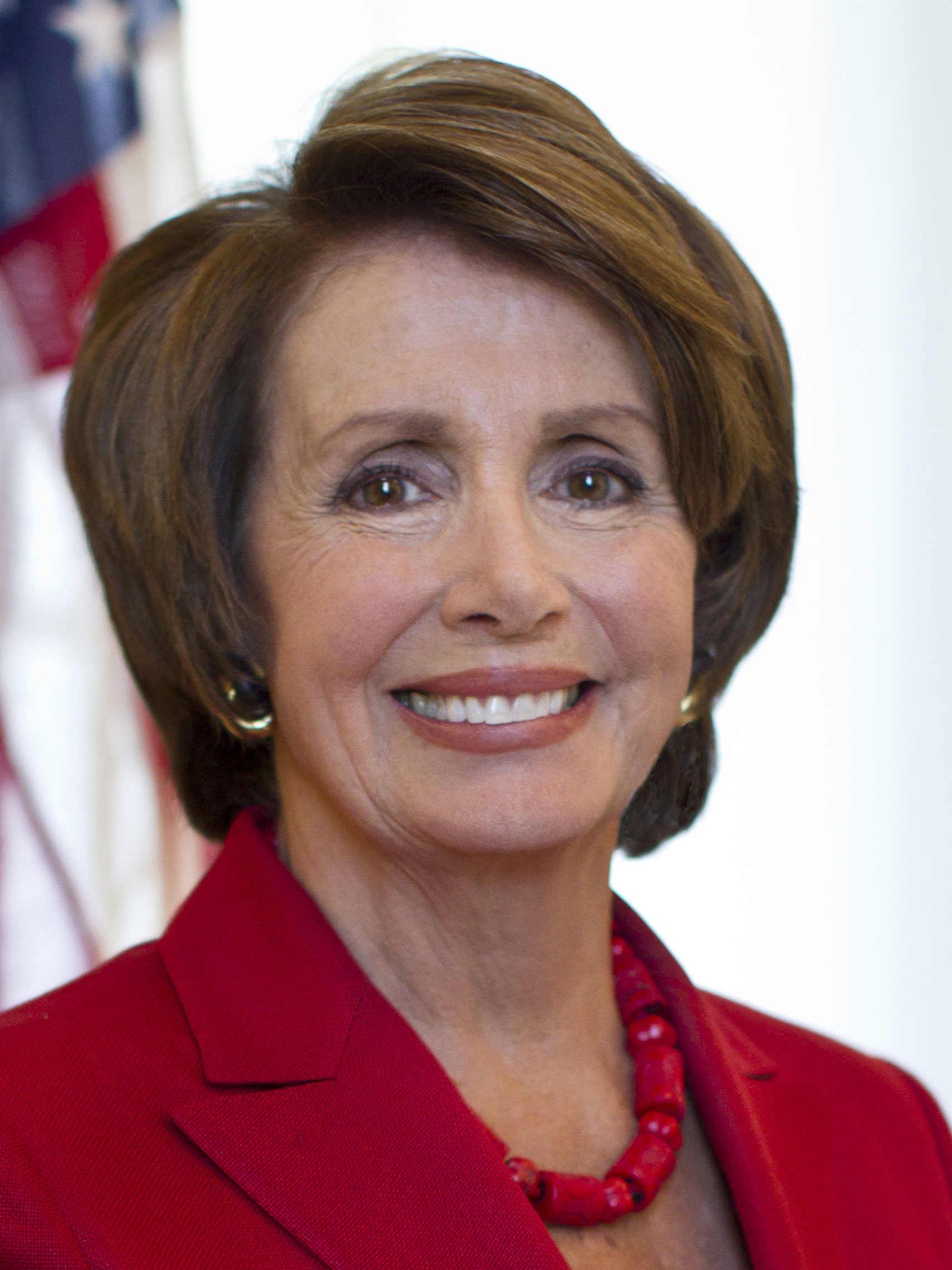

Nominee	Nancy Pelosi	Adam Sparks
Party	Democratic	Republican
Popular vote	181,847	25,298
Percentage	84.4%	11.7%
- County results Pelosi: 80–90%
U.S. Representative before election
Nancy Pelosi
Democratic
Elected U.S. Representative
Nancy Pelosi
Democratic

California's 8th congressional district election, 2000
Party	Candidate	Votes	%
Democratic	Nancy Pelosi (incumbent)	181,847	84.41
Republican	Adam Sparks	25,298	11.74
Libertarian	Erik Bauman	5,645	2.62
Natural Law	David Smithstein	2,638	1.22
Invalid or blank votes		0	0.00
Total votes		215,428	100.00
Turnout			
Democratic hold			

== District 9 ==
2000 California's 9th congressional district election
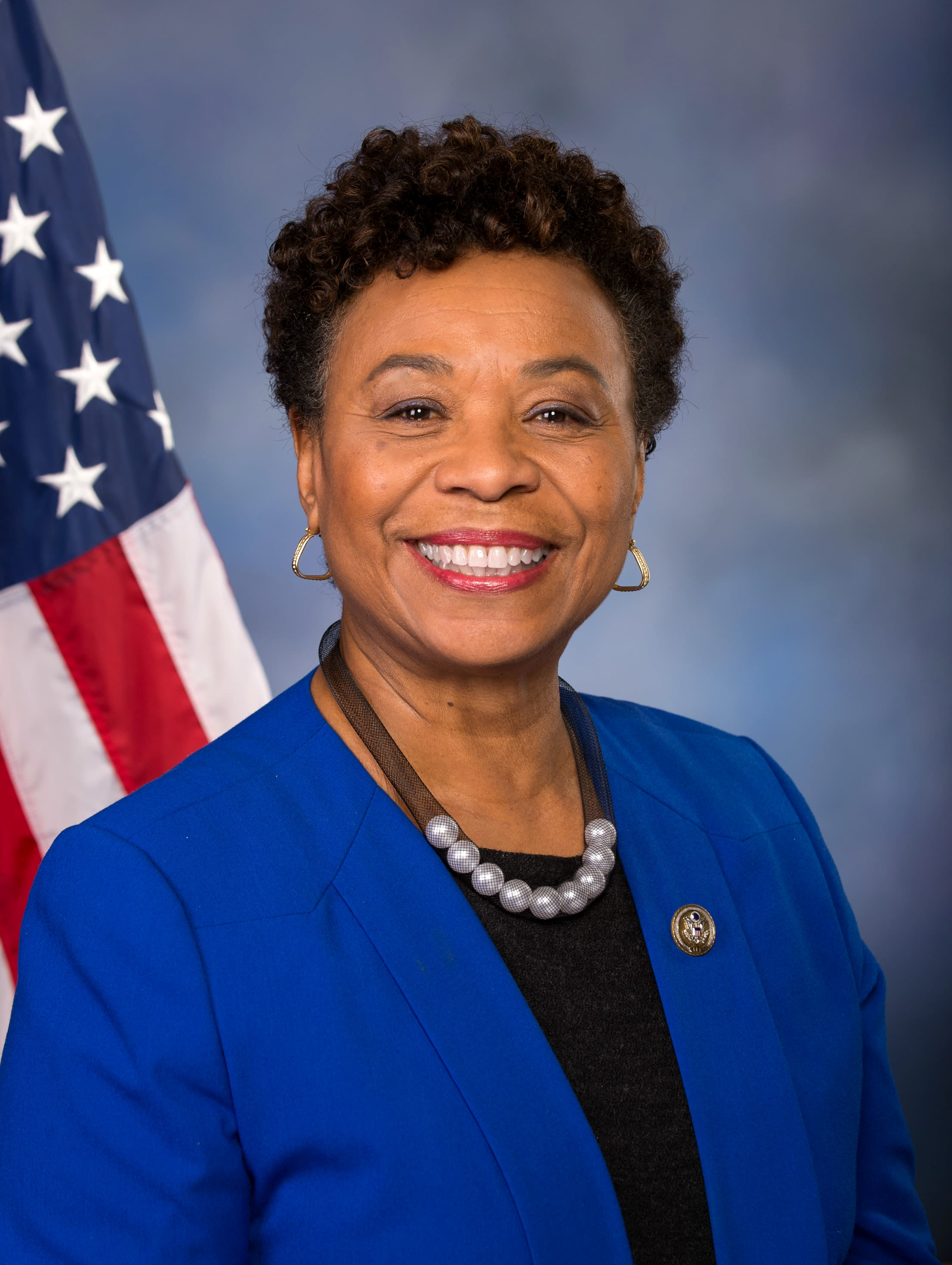

Nominee	Barbara Lee	Arneze Washington
Party	Democratic	Republican
Popular vote	182,352	21,033
Percentage	85.0%	9.8%
- County results Lee: 80–90%
U.S. Representative before election
Barbara Lee
Democratic
Elected U.S. Representative
Barbara Lee
Democratic

California's 9th congressional district election, 2000
Party	Candidate	Votes	%
Democratic	Barbara Lee (incumbent)	182,352	84.95
Republican	Arneze Washington	21,033	9.80
Libertarian	Fred E. Foldvary	7,051	3.28
Natural Law	Ellen Jefferds	4,214	1.96
Invalid or blank votes		15,267	6.64
Total votes		229,917	100.00
Turnout			
Democratic hold			

== District 10 ==
2000 California's 10th congressional district election
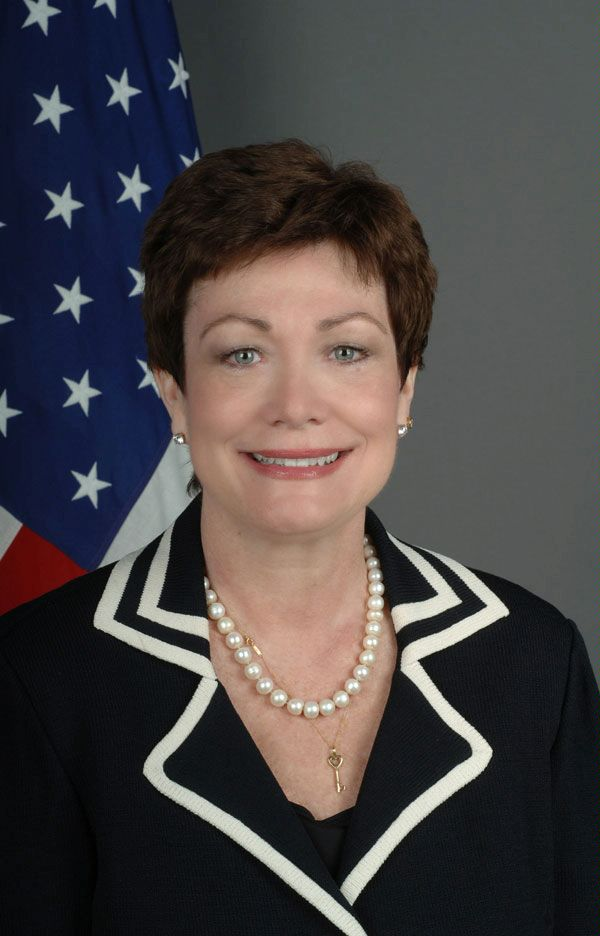

Nominee	Ellen Tauscher	Claude B. Hutchison, Jr.
Party	Democratic	Republican
Popular vote	160,429	134,863
Percentage	52.6%	44.2%
- County results Tauscher: 50–60%
U.S. Representative before election
Ellen Tauscher
Democratic
Elected U.S. Representative
Ellen Tauscher
Democratic

California's 10th congressional district election, 2000
Party	Candidate	Votes	%
Democratic	Ellen Tauscher (incumbent)	160,429	52.63
Republican	Claude B. Hutchison, Jr.	134,863	44.24
Natural Law	Valerie Janlois	9,527	3.13
Invalid or blank votes		13,011	4.09
Total votes		317,830	100.00
Turnout			
Democratic hold			

== District 11 ==
2000 California's 11th congressional district election
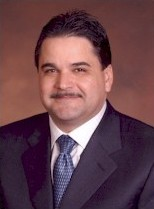

Nominee	Richard Pombo	Tom Y. Santos
Party	Republican	Democratic
Popular vote	120,635	79,539
Percentage	57.8%	38.1%
- County results Pombo: 50–60%
U.S. Representative before election
Richard Pombo
Republican
Elected U.S. Representative
Richard Pombo
Republican

California's 11th congressional district election, 2000
Party	Candidate	Votes	%
Republican	Richard Pombo (incumbent)	120,635	57.83
Democratic	Tom Y. Santos	79,539	38.13
Libertarian	Kathryn A. Russow	5,036	2.41
Natural Law	Jon A. Kurey	3,397	1.63
Invalid or blank votes		4,834	2.26
Total votes		213,441	100.00
Turnout			
Republican hold			

== District 12 ==
2000 California's 12th congressional district election
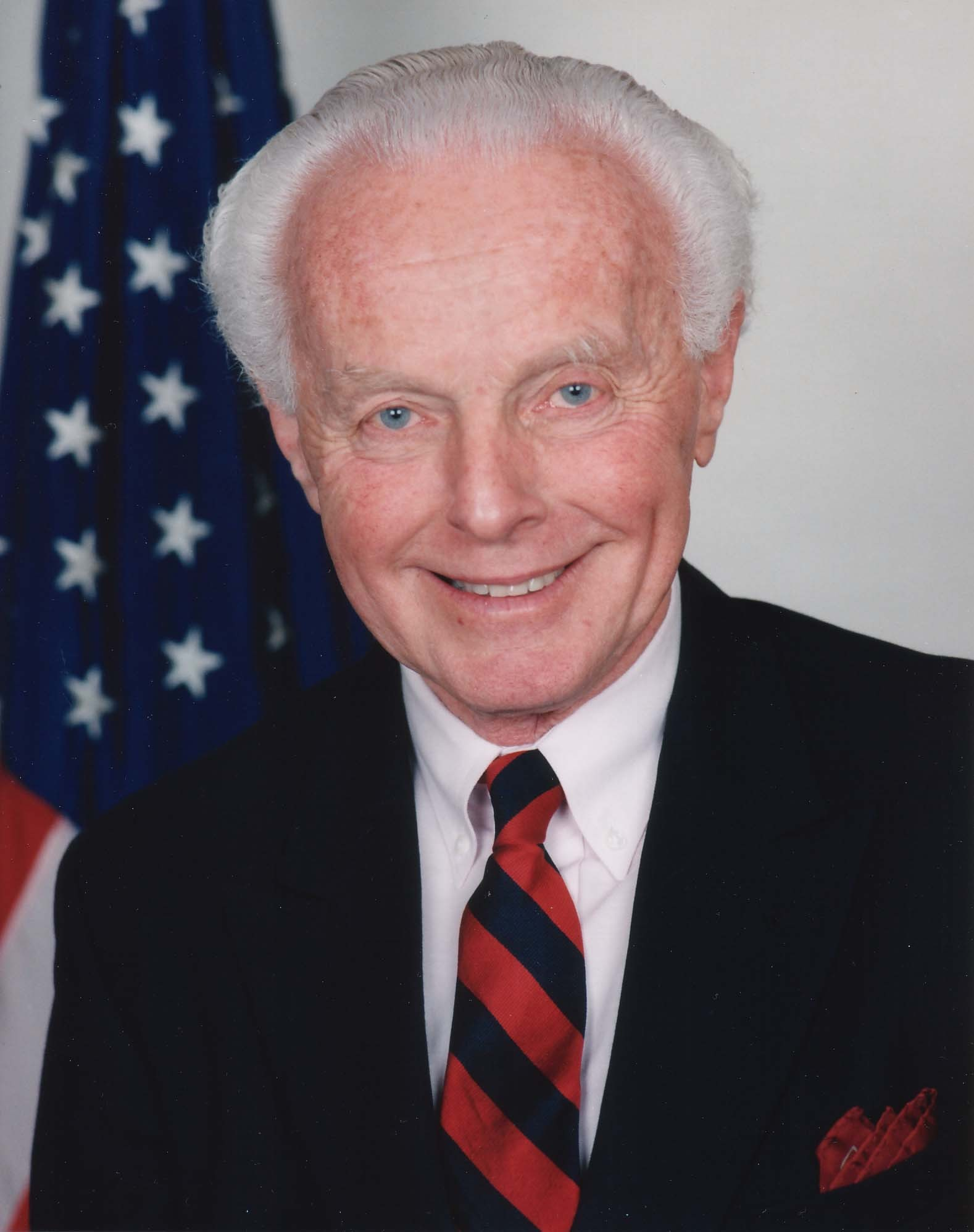

Nominee	Tom Lantos	Mike Garza
Party	Democratic	Republican
Popular vote	158,404	44,162
Percentage	74.5%	20.8%
- County results Lantos: 70–80%
U.S. Representative before election
Tom Lantos
Democratic
Elected U.S. Representative
Tom Lantos
Democratic

California's 12th congressional district election, 2000
Party	Candidate	Votes	%
Democratic	Tom Lantos (incumbent)	158,404	74.52
Republican	Mike Garza	44,162	20.78
Libertarian	Barbara J. Less	6,431	3.03
Natural Law	Rifkin Young	3,559	1.67
Invalid or blank votes		0	0.00
Total votes		212,556	100.00
Turnout			
Democratic hold			

== District 13 ==
2000 California's 13th congressional district election
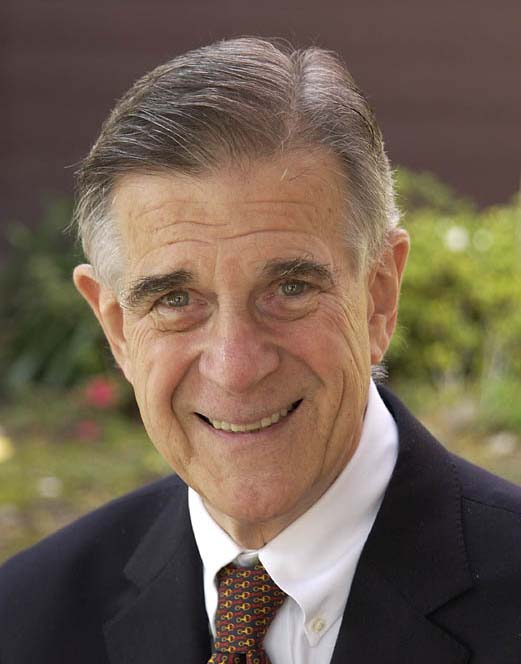

Nominee	Pete Stark	James R. "Jim" Goetz
Party	Democratic	Republican
Popular vote	129,012	44,499
Percentage	70.4%	24.3%
- County results Stark: 60–70% 70–80%
U.S. Representative before election
Pete Stark
Democratic
Elected U.S. Representative
Pete Stark
Democratic

California's 13th congressional district election, 2000
Party	Candidate	Votes	%
Democratic	Pete Stark (incumbent)	129,012	70.44
Republican	James R. "Jim" Goetz	44,499	24.30
Libertarian	Howard Mora	4,623	2.52
Natural Law	Timothy R. Hoehner	2,647	1.45
American Independent	Don J. Grundmann	2,365	1.29
Invalid or blank votes		12,876	6.57
Total votes		196,022	100.00
Turnout			
Democratic hold			

== District 14 ==
2000 California's 14th congressional district election
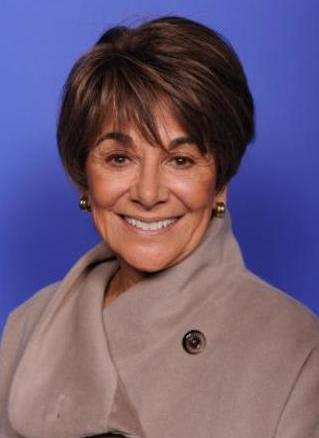

Nominee	Anna Eshoo	Bill Quraishi
Party	Democratic	Republican
Popular vote	161,720	59,338
Percentage	70.2%	25.8%
- County results Eshoo: 60–70% 70–80%
U.S. Representative before election
Anna Eshoo
Democratic
Elected U.S. Representative
Anna Eshoo
Democratic

California's 14th congressional district election, 2000
Party	Candidate	Votes	%
Democratic	Anna Eshoo (incumbent)	161,720	70.23
Republican	Bill Quraishi	59,338	25.77
Libertarian	Joseph W. Dehn III	4,715	2.05
Natural Law	John Black	4,489	1.95
Invalid or blank votes		9,457	3.95
Total votes		239,719	100.00
Turnout			
Democratic hold			

== District 15 ==
2000 California's 15th congressional district election
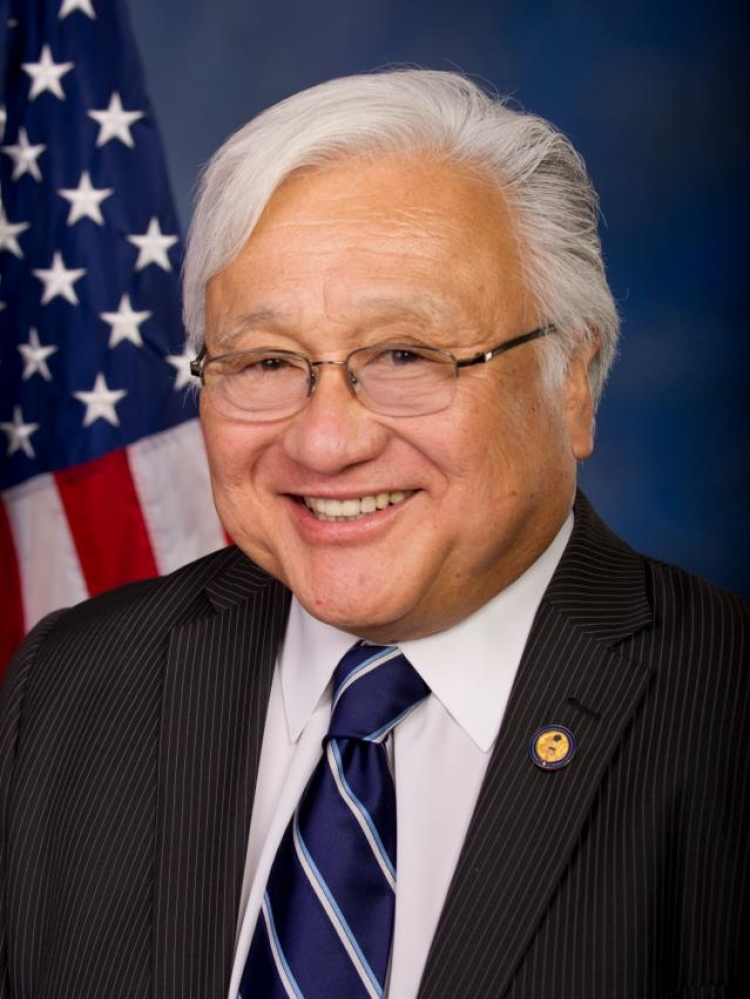

Nominee	Mike Honda	Jim Cunneen
Party	Democratic	Republican
Popular vote	128,545	99,866
Percentage	54.3%	42.1%
- County results Honda: 50–60%
U.S. Representative before election
Tom Campbell
Republican
Elected U.S. Representative
Mike Honda
Democratic

California's 15th congressional district election, 2000
Party	Candidate	Votes	%
Democratic	Mike Honda	128,545	54.26
Republican	Jim Cunneen	99,866	42.15
Libertarian	Ed Wimmers	4,820	2.03
Natural Law	Douglas C. Gorney	3,591	1.52
No party	Phillip Kronzer (write-in)	82	0.03
Invalid or blank votes		11,372	4.58
Total votes		248,276	100.00
Turnout			
Democratic gain from Republican			

== District 16 ==
2000 California's 16th congressional district election
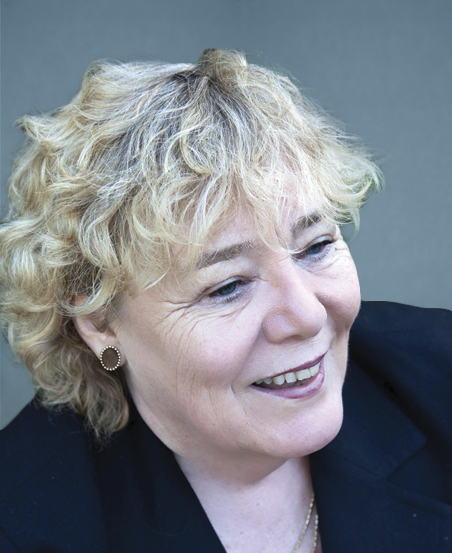

Nominee	Zoe Lofgren	Horace "Gene" Thayn
Party	Democratic	Republican
Popular vote	115,118	37,213
Percentage	72.1%	23.3%
- County results Lofgren: 70–80%
U.S. Representative before election
Zoe Lofgren
Democratic
Elected U.S. Representative
Zoe Lofgren
Democratic

California's 16th congressional district election, 2000
Party	Candidate	Votes	%
Democratic	Zoe Lofgren (incumbent)	115,118	72.06
Republican	Horace "Gene" Thayn	37,213	23.30
Libertarian	Dennis Michael Umphress	4,742	2.97
Natural Law	Edward J. Klein	2,673	1.67
Invalid or blank votes		12,742	7.39
Total votes		172,488	100.00
Turnout			
Democratic hold			

== District 17 ==
2000 California's 17th congressional district election
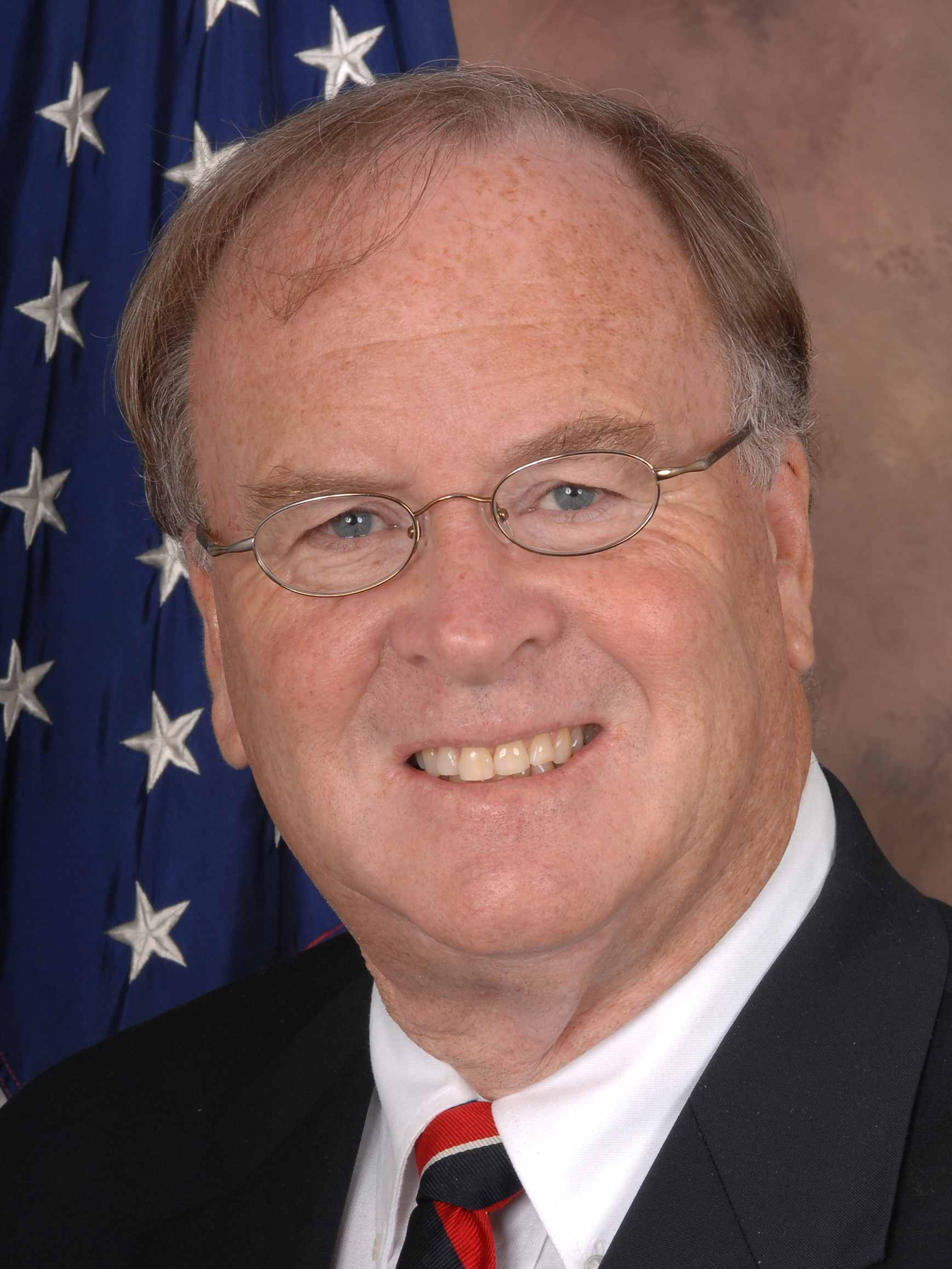

Nominee	Sam Farr	Clint Engler
Party	Democratic	Republican
Popular vote	143,219	51,557
Percentage	68.6%	24.7%
- County results Farr: 60–70% 70–80%
U.S. Representative before election
Sam Farr
Democratic
Elected U.S. Representative
Sam Farr
Democratic

California's 17th congressional district election, 2000
Party	Candidate	Votes	%
Democratic	Sam Farr (incumbent)	143,219	68.60
Republican	Clint Engler	51,557	24.70
Green	E. Craig Coffin	8,215	3.94
Libertarian	Rick S. Garrett	2,510	1.20
Reform	Larry Fenton	2,263	1.08
Natural Law	Scott R. Hartley	996	0.48
Invalid or blank votes		7,599	3.51
Total votes		216,359	100.00
Turnout			
Democratic hold			

== District 18 ==
2000 California's 18th congressional district election
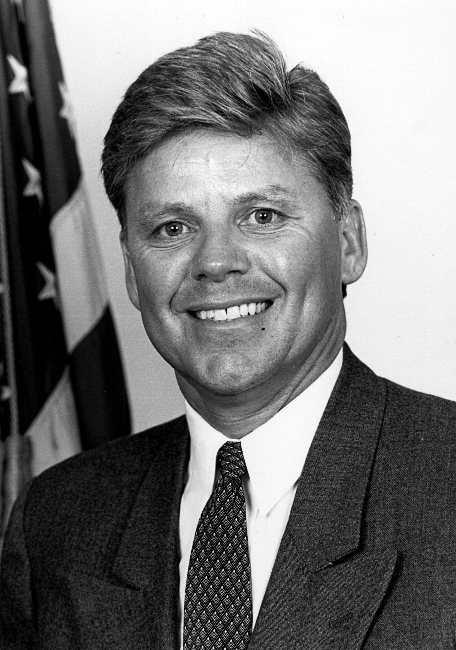

Nominee	Gary Condit	Steve R. Wilson
Party	Democratic	Republican
Popular vote	118,842	56,465
Percentage	66.7%	31.7%
- County results Condit: 50–60% 60–70% 70–80% Wilson: 40–50%
U.S. Representative before election
Gary Condit
Democratic
Elected U.S. Representative
Gary Condit
Democratic

California's 18th congressional district election, 2000
Party	Candidate	Votes	%
Democratic	Gary Condit (incumbent)	118,842	66.70
Republican	Steve R. Wilson	56,465	31.69
Natural Law	Page Roth Riskin	2,860	1.61
Invalid or blank votes		6,378	3.46
Total votes		184,545	100.00
Turnout			
Democratic hold			

== District 19 ==
2000 California's 19th congressional district election
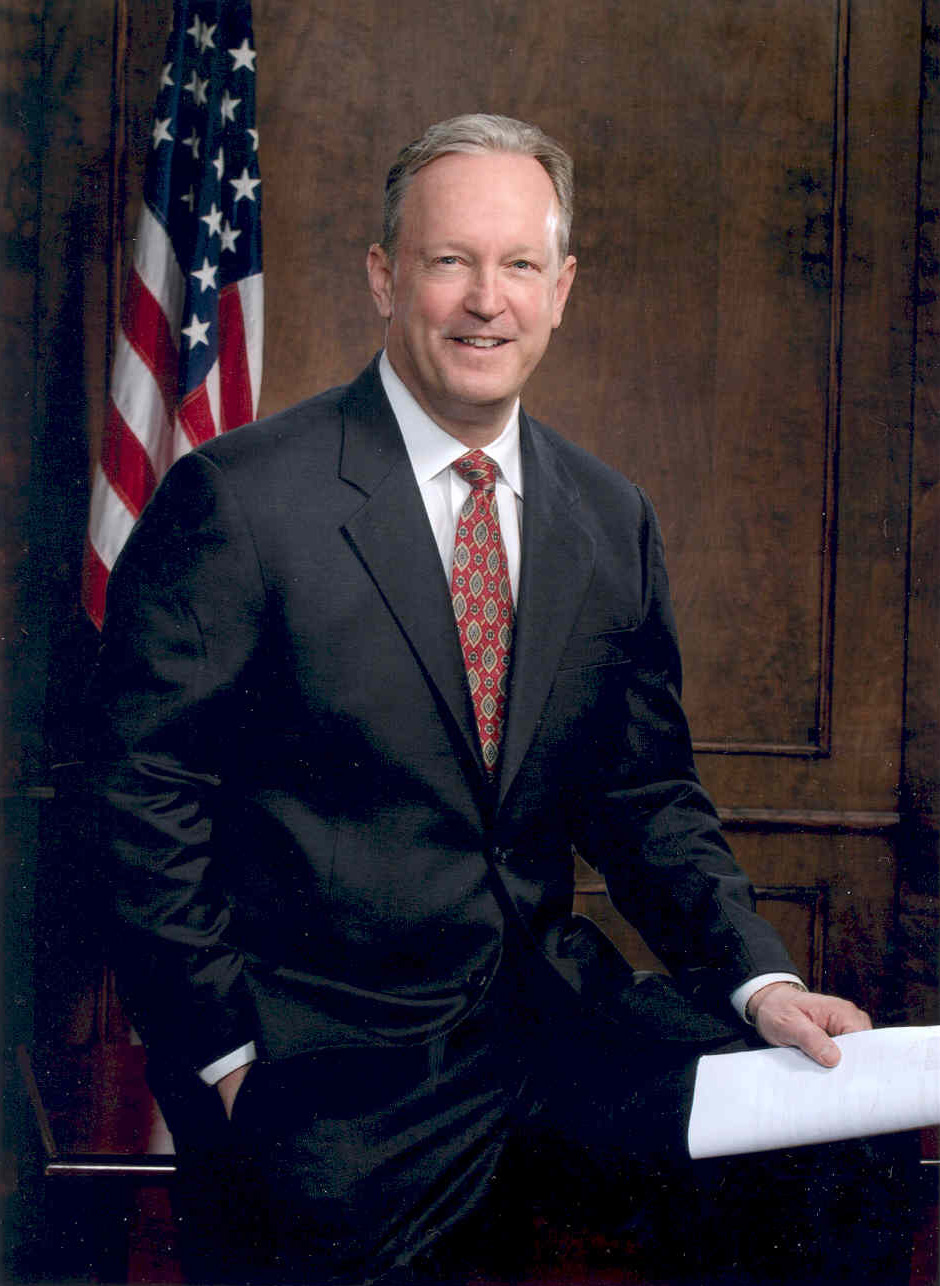

Nominee	George Radanovich	Dan Rosenberg
Party	Republican	Democratic
Popular vote	144,517	70,578
Percentage	64.9%	31.7%
- County results Radanovich: 60–70% 70–80%
U.S. Representative before election
George Radanovich
Republican
Elected U.S. Representative
George Radanovich
Republican

California's 19th congressional district election, 2000
Party	Candidate	Votes	%
Republican	George Radanovich (incumbent)	144,517	64.92
Democratic	Dan Rosenberg	70,578	31.70
Libertarian	Elizabeth Taylor	4,264	1.92
Natural Law	Bob Miller	1,990	0.89
American Independent	Edmon V. Kaiser	1,266	0.57
Invalid or blank votes		8,538	3.69
Total votes		231,153	100.00
Turnout			
Republican hold			

== District 20 ==
2000 California's 20th congressional district election
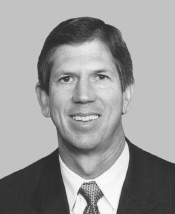

Nominee	Cal Dooley	Rich Rodriguez
Party	Democratic	Republican
Popular vote	66,235	57,563
Percentage	52.4%	45.5%
- County results Dooley: 50–60% 60–70% Rodriguez: 50–60%
U.S. Representative before election
Cal Dooley
Democratic
Elected U.S. Representative
Cal Dooley
Democratic

=== General election ===
==== Polling ====
Poll source	Date(s)	Sample size	Margin of error	Cal Dooley (D)	Rich Rodriguez (R)	Other / undecided (Note: Calculated by taking the difference of 100% and all other candidates combined.)
FM3 Research (D) (Note: Poll conducted for Cal Dooley.)	October 24, 2000	400	—	49%	38%	13%
California State University, Bakersfield	October 20, 2000	483	—	38%	41%	21%

==== Results ====
California's 20th congressional district election, 2000
Party	Candidate	Votes	%
Democratic	Cal Dooley (incumbent)	66,235	52.35
Republican	Rich Rodriguez	57,563	45.49
Natural Law	Walter Kenneth Ruehlig	1,416	1.12
Libertarian	Arnold Kriegbaum	1,320	1.04
Invalid or blank votes		2,023	1.57
Total votes		128,557	100.00
Turnout			
Democratic hold			

== District 21 ==
2000 California's 21st congressional district election
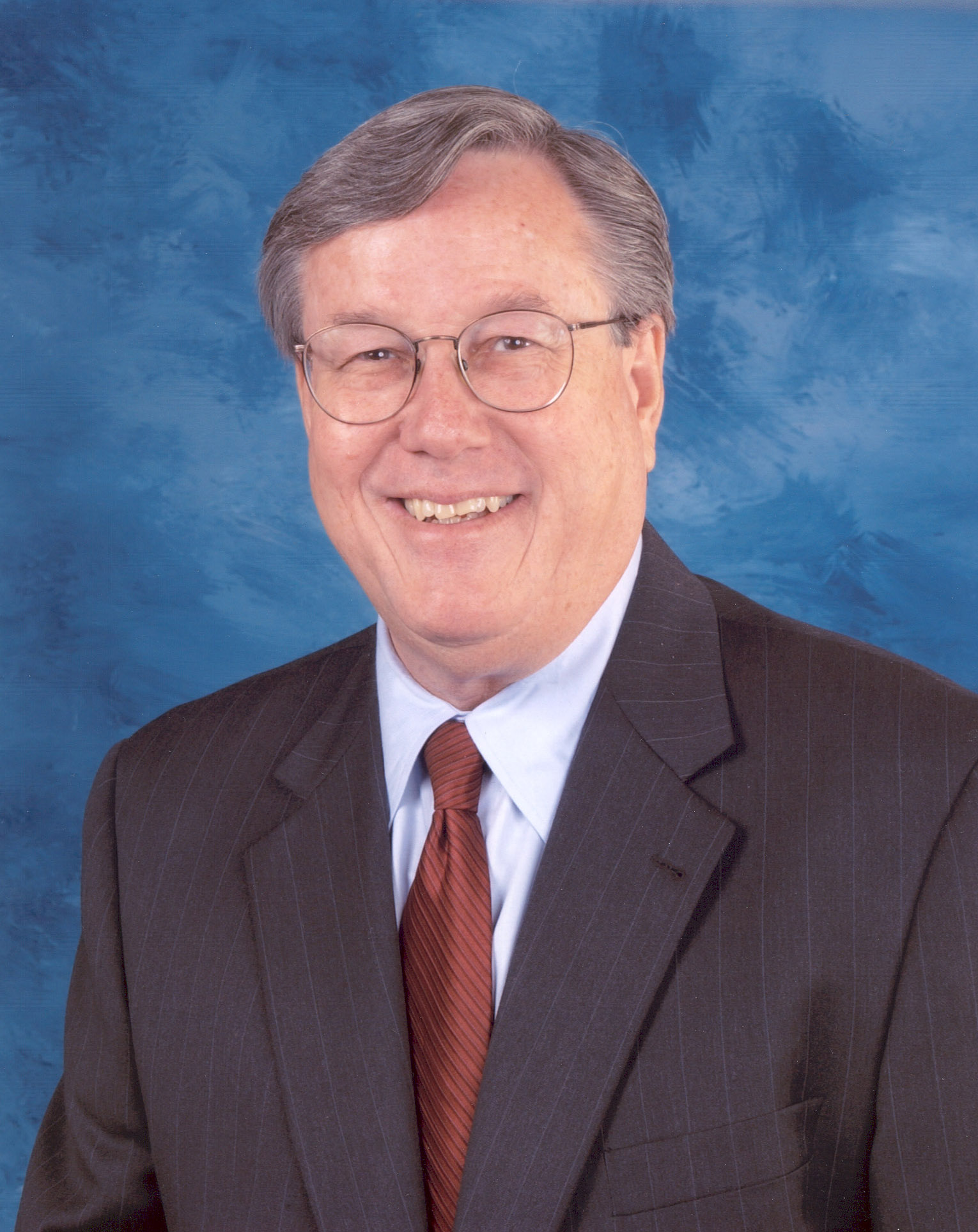

Nominee	Bill Thomas	Pedro "Pete" Martinez
Party	Republican	Democratic
Popular vote	142,539	49,318
Percentage	71.6%	24.8%
- County results Thomas: 60–70% 70–80%
U.S. Representative before election
Bill Thomas
Republican
Elected U.S. Representative
Bill Thomas
Republican

California's 21st congressional district election, 2000
Party	Candidate	Votes	%
Republican	Bill Thomas (incumbent)	142,539	71.59
Democratic	Pedro "Pete" Martinez	49,318	24.77
Libertarian	James R.S. Manion	7,243	3.64
Invalid or blank votes		1,806	0.90
Total votes		200,906	100.00
Turnout			
Republican hold			

== District 22 ==
2000 California's 22nd congressional district election
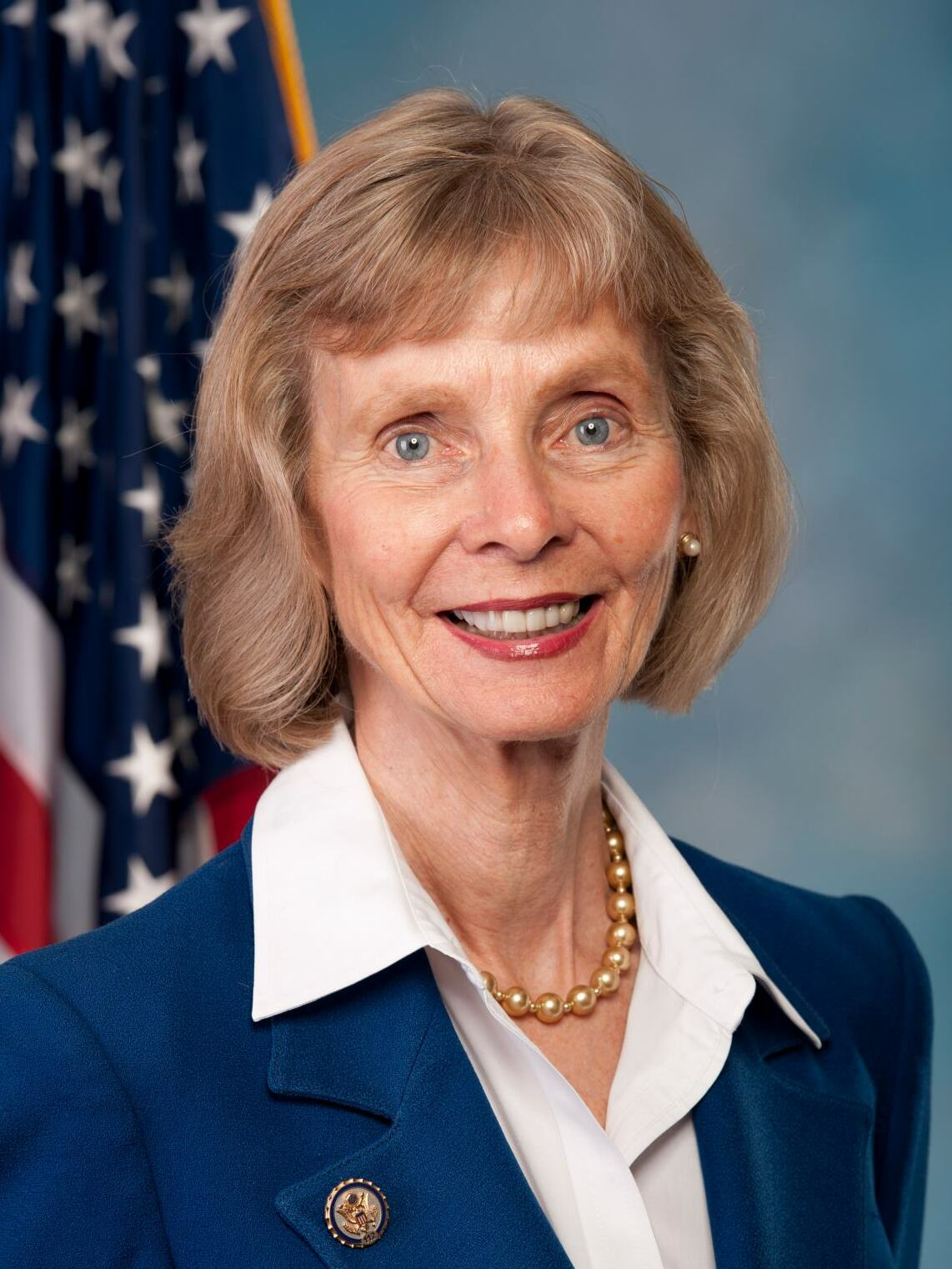

Nominee	Lois Capps	Mike Stoker
Party	Democratic	Republican
Popular vote	135,538	113,094
Percentage	53.1%	44.3%
- County results Capps: 50–60% Stoker: 40–50%
U.S. Representative before election
Lois Capps
Democratic
Elected U.S. Representative
Lois Capps
Democratic

California's 22nd congressional district election, 2000
Party	Candidate	Votes	%
Democratic	Lois Capps (incumbent)	135,538	53.14
Republican	Mike Stoker	113,094	44.34
Reform	Richard D. "Dick" Porter	2,490	0.98
Libertarian	Joe Furcinite	2,060	0.81
Natural Law	J. Carlos Aguirre	1,888	0.74
Invalid or blank votes		5,532	2.12
Total votes		260,602	100.00
Turnout			
Democratic hold			

== District 23 ==
2000 California's 23rd congressional district election
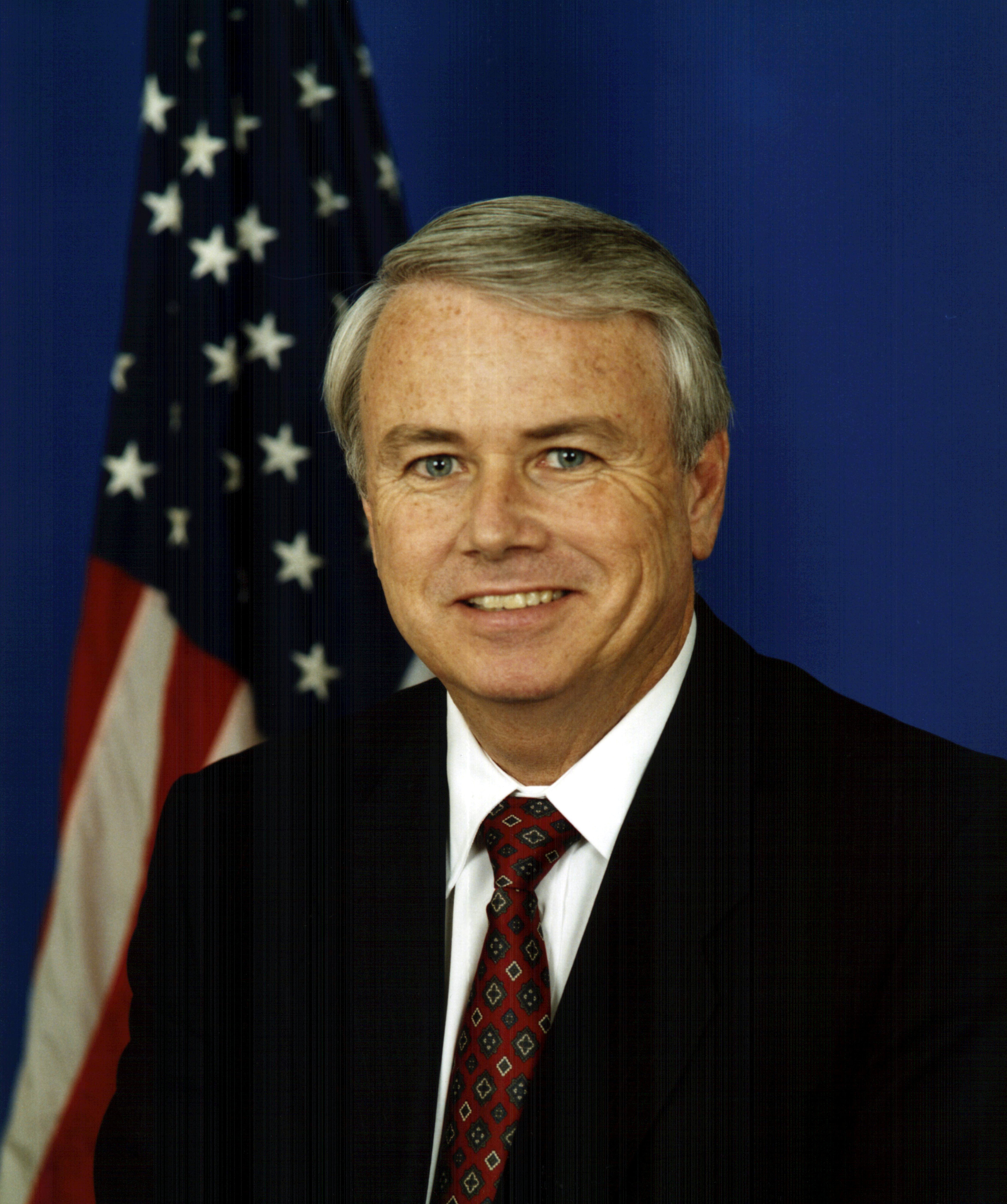

Nominee	Elton Gallegly	Michael Case
Party	Republican	Democratic
Popular vote	119,479	89,918
Percentage	54.0%	40.7%
- County results Case: 40–50% Gallegly: 50–60%
U.S. Representative before election
Elton Gallegly
Republican
Elected U.S. Representative
Elton Gallegly
Republican

California's 23rd congressional district election, 2000
Party	Candidate	Votes	%
Republican	Elton Gallegly (incumbent)	119,479	54.05
Democratic	Michael Case	89,918	40.68
Reform	Cary Savitch	6,473	2.93
Libertarian	Roger Peebles	3,708	1.68
Natural Law	Stephen P. Hospodar	1,456	0.66
Invalid or blank votes		10,847	4.68
Total votes		231,881	100.00
Turnout			
Republican hold			

== District 24 ==
2000 California's 24th congressional district election
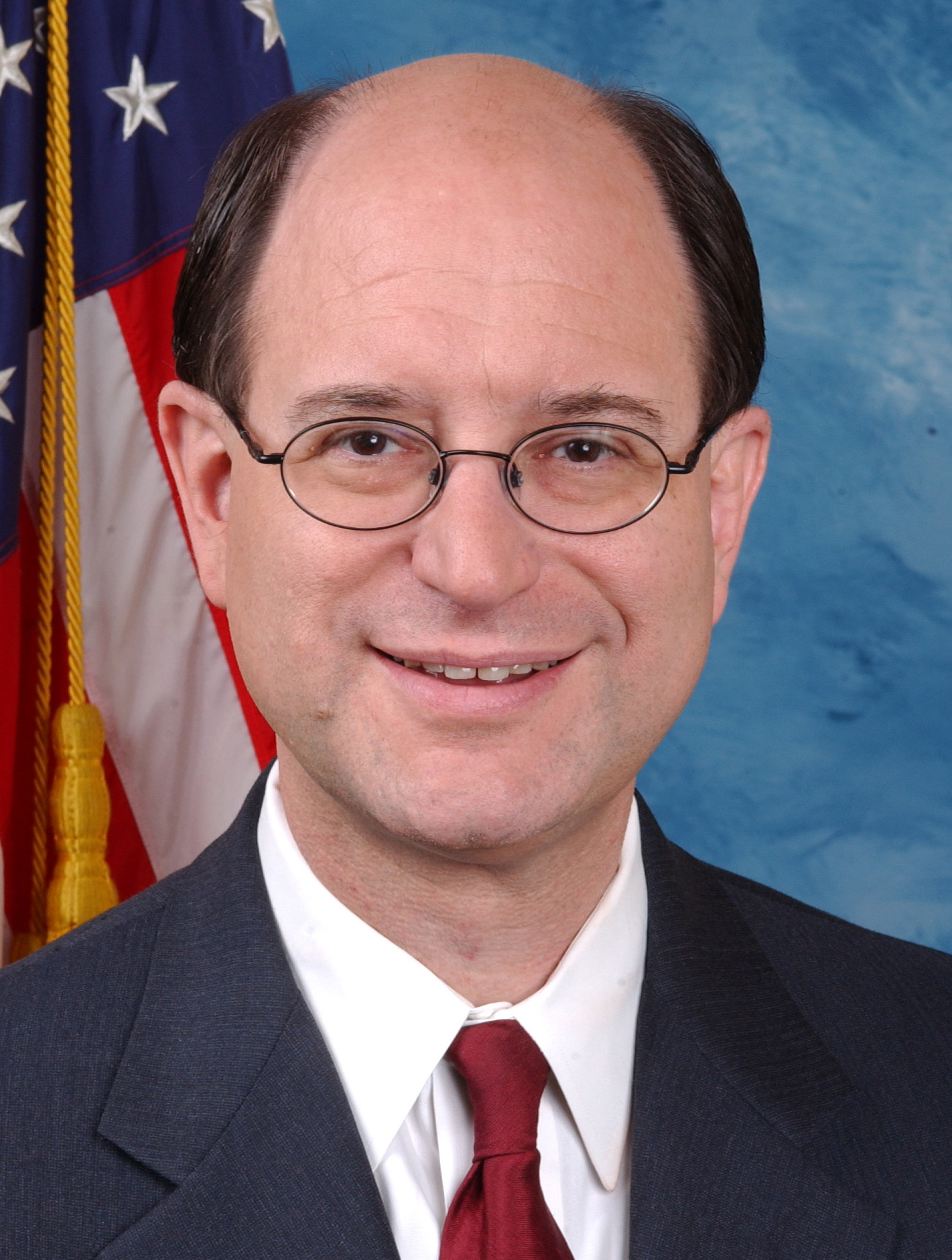

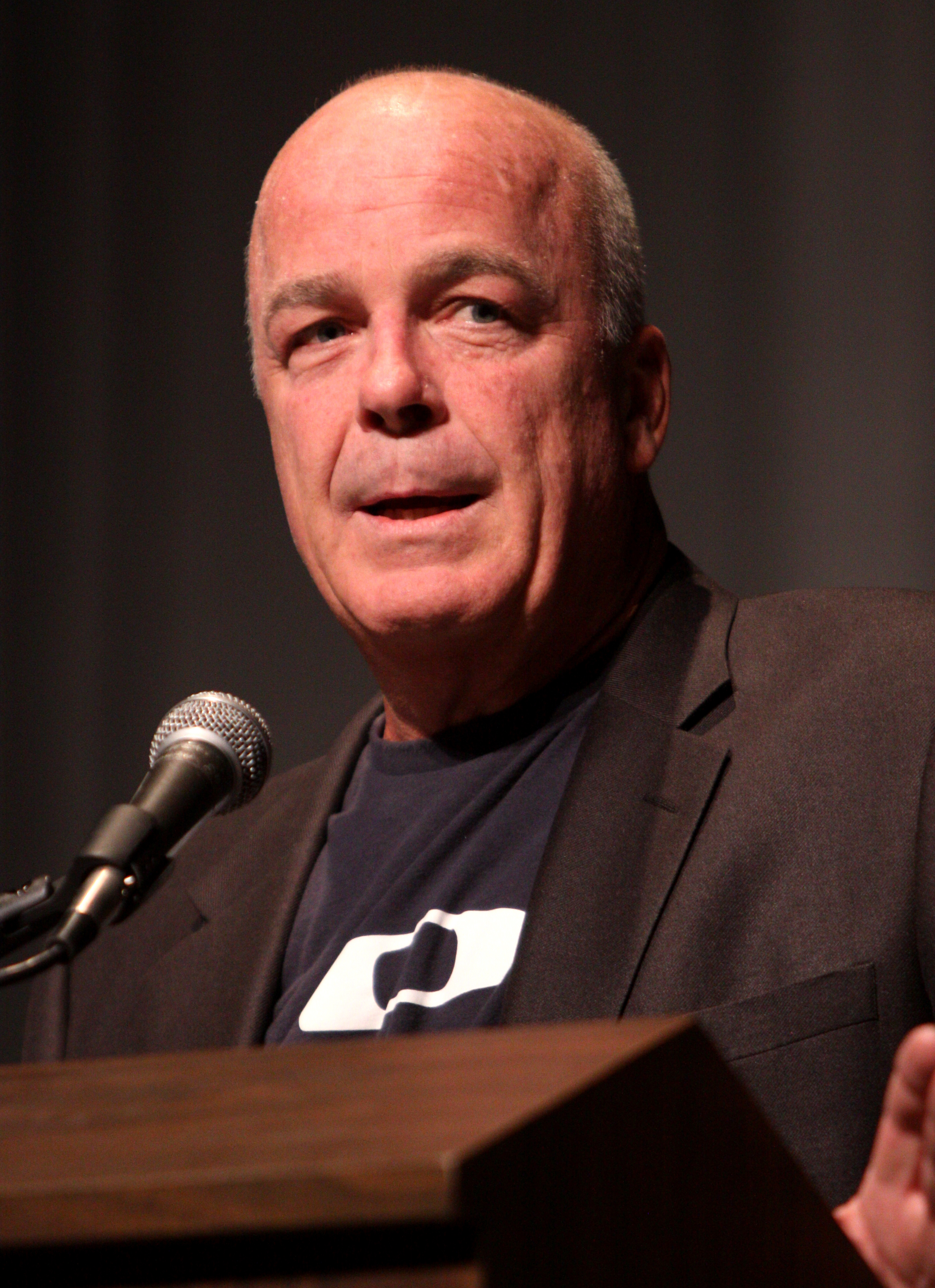
Nominee	Brad Sherman	Jerry Doyle
Party	Democratic	Republican
Popular vote	155,398	70,169
Percentage	66.0%	29.8%
- County results Sherman: 50–60% 60–70%
U.S. Representative before election
Brad Sherman
Democratic
Elected U.S. Representative
Brad Sherman
Democratic

California's 24th congressional district election, 2000
Party	Candidate	Votes	%
Democratic	Brad Sherman (incumbent)	155,398	66.00
Republican	Jerry Doyle	70,169	29.80
Libertarian	Juan Carlos Ros	6,966	2.96
Natural Law	Michael Cuddehe	2,911	1.24
Invalid or blank votes		144,791	38.08
Total votes		380,235	100.00
Turnout			
Democratic hold			

== District 25 ==
2000 California's 25th congressional district election
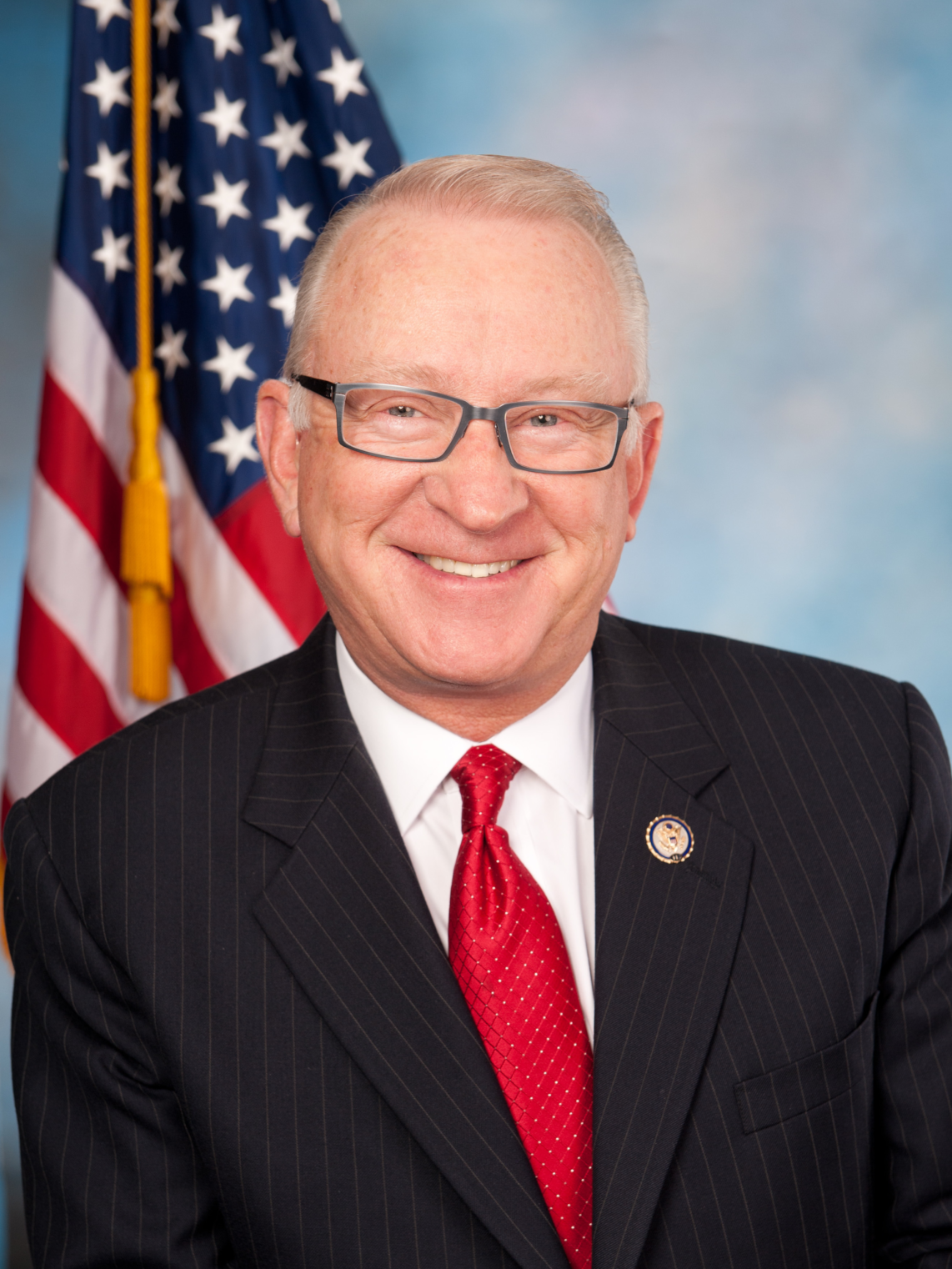

Nominee	Howard McKeon	Sid Gold
Party	Republican	Democratic
Popular vote	138,628	73,921
Percentage	62.2%	33.2%
- County results McKeon: 60–70%
U.S. Representative before election
Howard McKeon
Republican
Elected U.S. Representative
Howard McKeon
Republican

California's 25th congressional district election, 2000
Party	Candidate	Votes	%
Republican	Howard McKeon (incumbent)	138,628	62.23
Democratic	Sid Gold	73,921	33.18
Libertarian	Bruce R. Acker	7,219	3.24
Natural Law	Mews Small	3,010	1.35
Invalid or blank votes		16,259	6.80
Total votes		239,037	100.00
Turnout			
Republican hold			

== District 26 ==
2000 California's 26th congressional district election
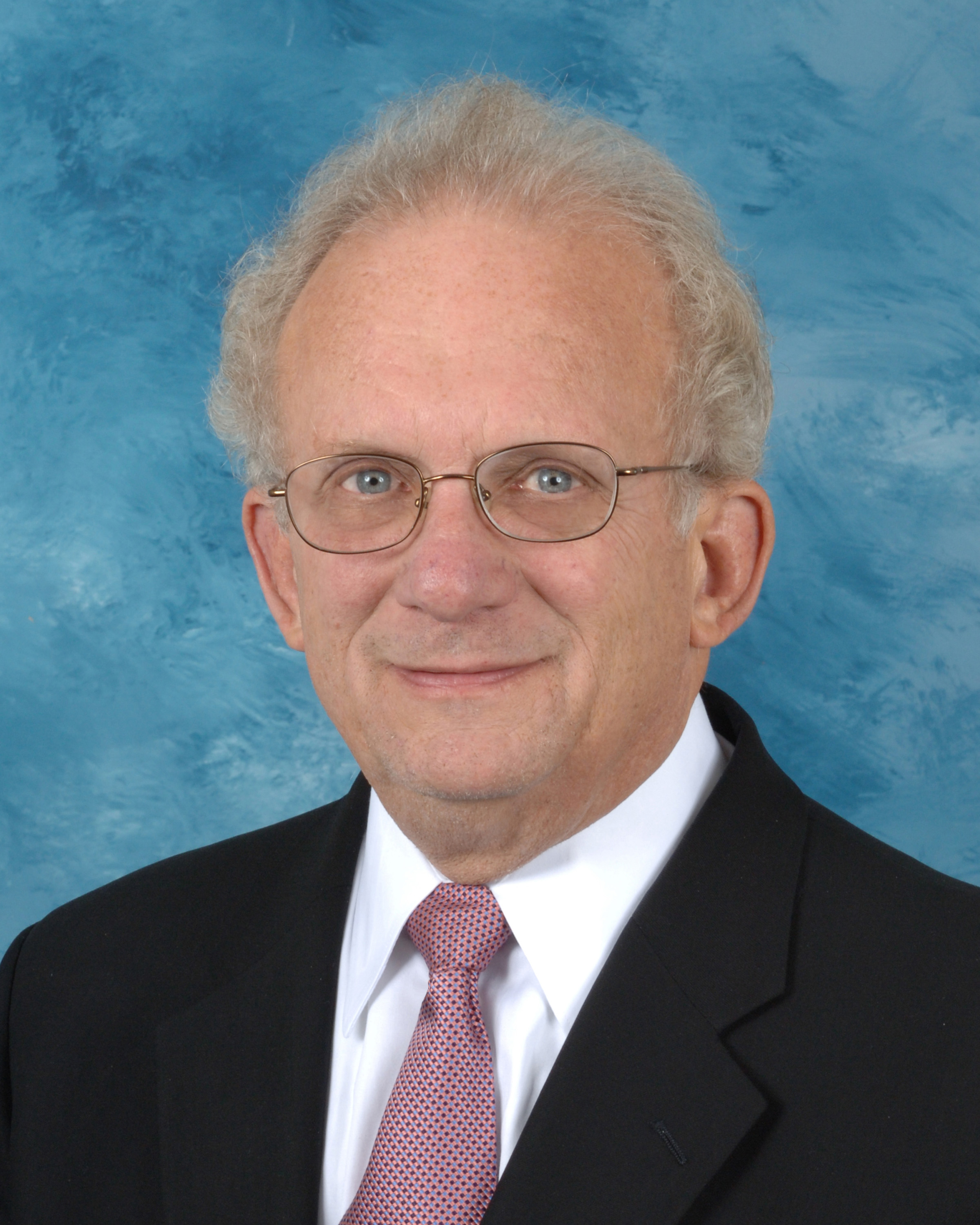

Nominee	Howard Berman	Bill Farley
Party	Democratic	Libertarian
Popular vote	96,500	13,052
Percentage	84.1%	11.4%
- County results Berman: 80–90%
U.S. Representative before election
Howard Berman
Democratic
Elected U.S. Representative
Howard Berman
Democratic

California's 26th congressional district election, 2000
Party	Candidate	Votes	%
Democratic	Howard Berman (incumbent)	96,500	84.07
Libertarian	Bill Farley	13,052	11.37
Natural Law	David L. Cossak	5,229	4.56
Independent	Robert Edwards	5	0.00
Invalid or blank votes		15,568	11.94
Total votes		130,354	100.00
Turnout			
Democratic hold			

== District 27 ==
2000 California's 27th congressional district election
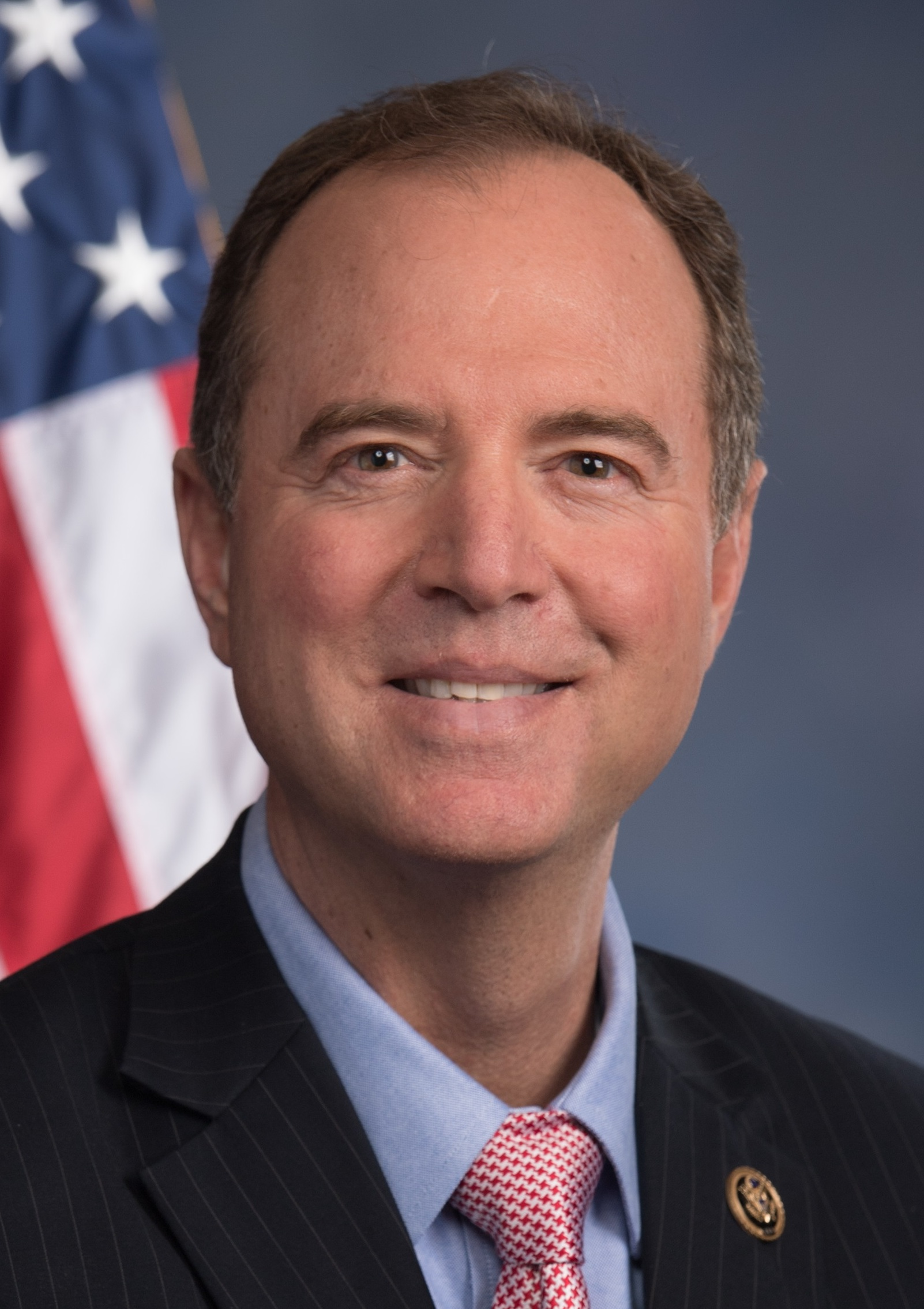

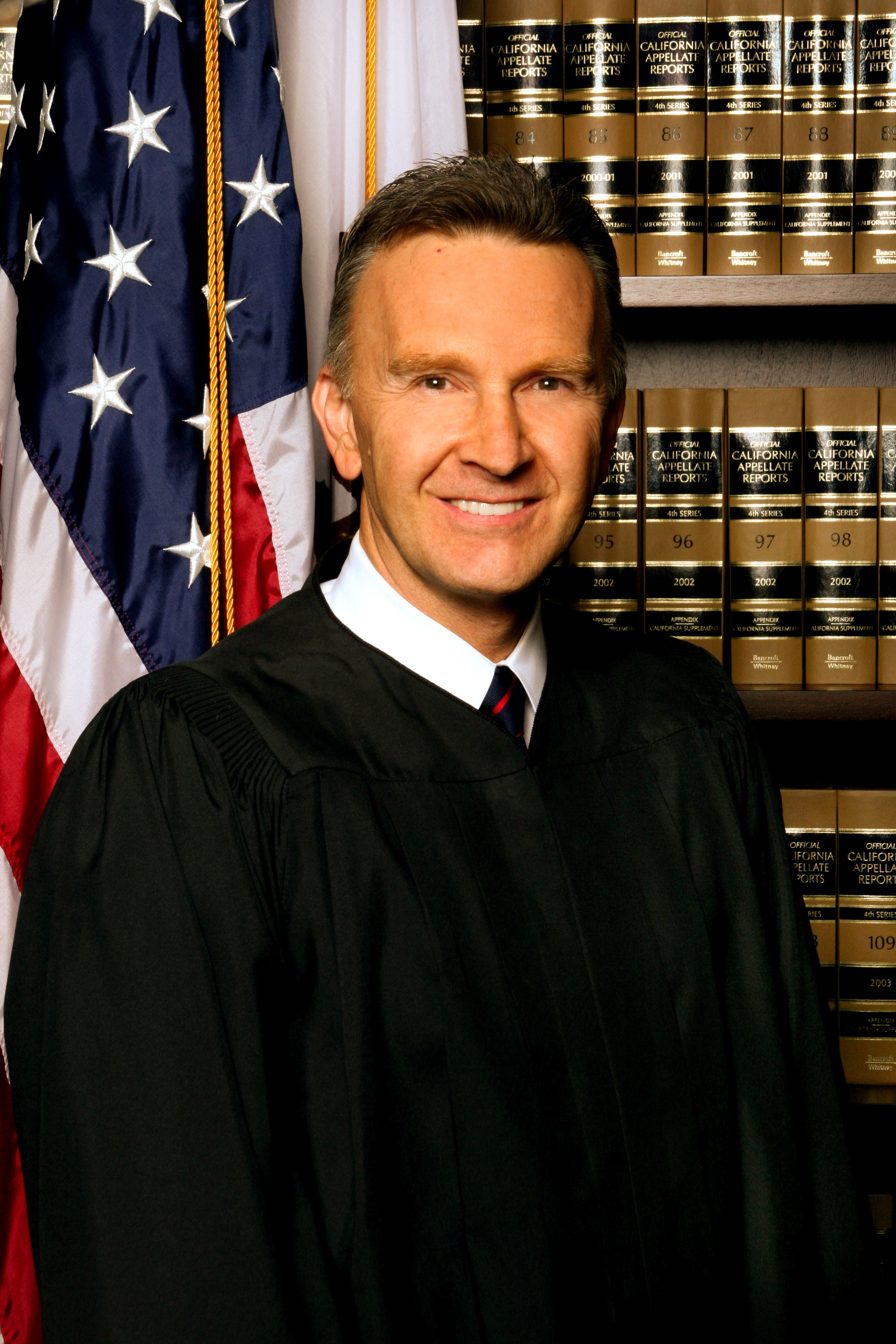
Nominee	Adam Schiff	Jim Rogan
Party	Democratic	Republican
Popular vote	113,708	94,518
Percentage	52.7%	43.8%
- County results Schiff: 50–60%
U.S. Representative before election
Jim Rogan
Republican
Elected U.S. Representative
Adam Schiff
Democratic

California's 27th congressional district election, 2000
Party	Candidate	Votes	%
Democratic	Adam Schiff	113,708	52.70
Republican	Jim Rogan (incumbent)	94,518	43.80
Natural Law	Miriam R. Hospodar	3,873	1.79
Libertarian	Ted Brown	3,675	1.70
Invalid or blank votes		12,835	5.61
Total votes		228,609	100.00
Turnout			
Democratic gain from Republican			

== District 28 ==
2000 California's 28th congressional district election
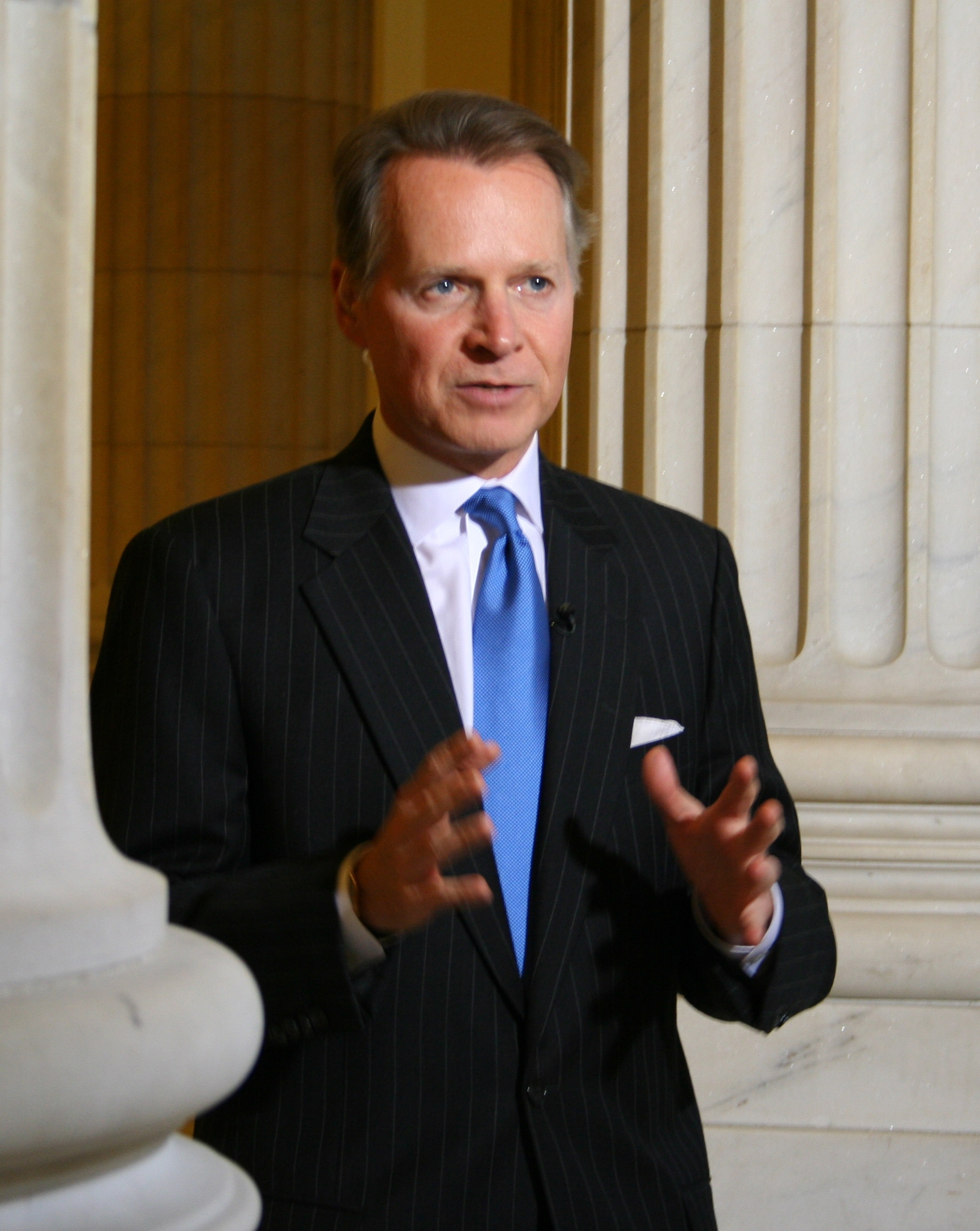

Nominee	David Dreier	Janice M. Nelson
Party	Republican	Democratic
Popular vote	116,557	81,804
Percentage	56.8%	39.9%
- County results Dreier: 50–60%
U.S. Representative before election
David Dreier
Republican
Elected U.S. Representative
David Dreier
Republican

California's 28th congressional district election, 2000
Party	Candidate	Votes	%
Republican	David Dreier (incumbent)	116,557	56.80
Democratic	Janice M. Nelson	81,804	39.87
Libertarian	Randall G. Weissbuch	2,823	1.38
Natural Law	Lawrence Allison	2,083	1.02
American Independent	Joe "Jay" Haytas	1,932	0.94
Invalid or blank votes		16,669	7.51
Total votes		221,868	100.00
Turnout			
Republican hold			

== District 29 ==
2000 California's 29th congressional district election
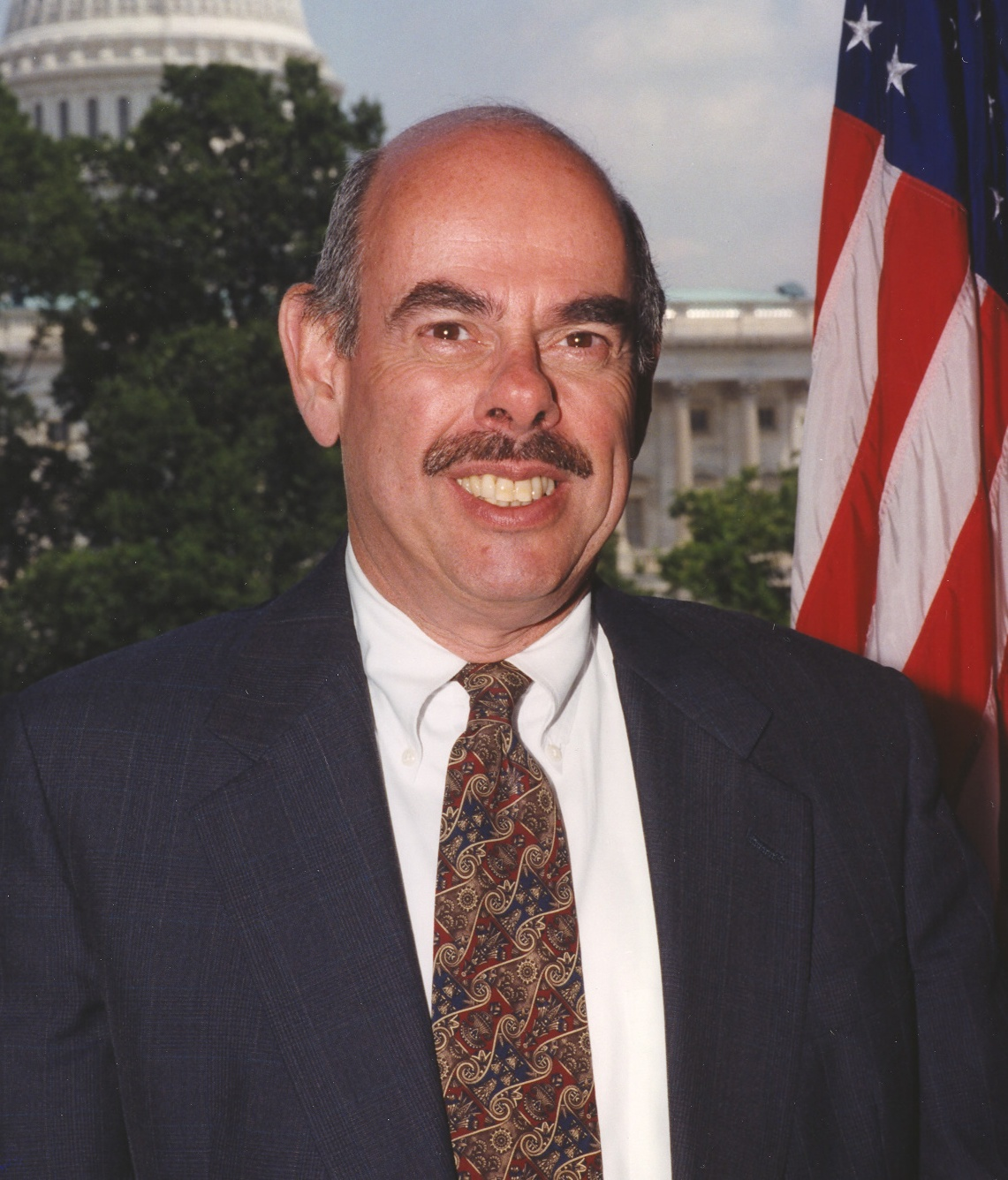

Nominee	Henry Waxman	Jim Scileppi
Party	Democratic	Republican
Popular vote	180,295	45,784
Percentage	75.7%	19.2%
- County results Waxman: 70–80%
U.S. Representative before election
Henry Waxman
Democratic
Elected U.S. Representative
Henry Waxman
Democratic

California's 29th congressional district election, 2000
Party	Candidate	Votes	%
Democratic	Henry Waxman (incumbent)	180,295	75.69
Republican	Jim Scileppi	45,784	19.22
Libertarian	Jack Anderson	7,944	3.33
Natural Law	Bruce Currivan	4,178	1.75
Invalid or blank votes		22,003	8.46
Total votes		260,204	100.00
Turnout			
Democratic hold			

== District 30 ==
2000 California's 30th congressional district election
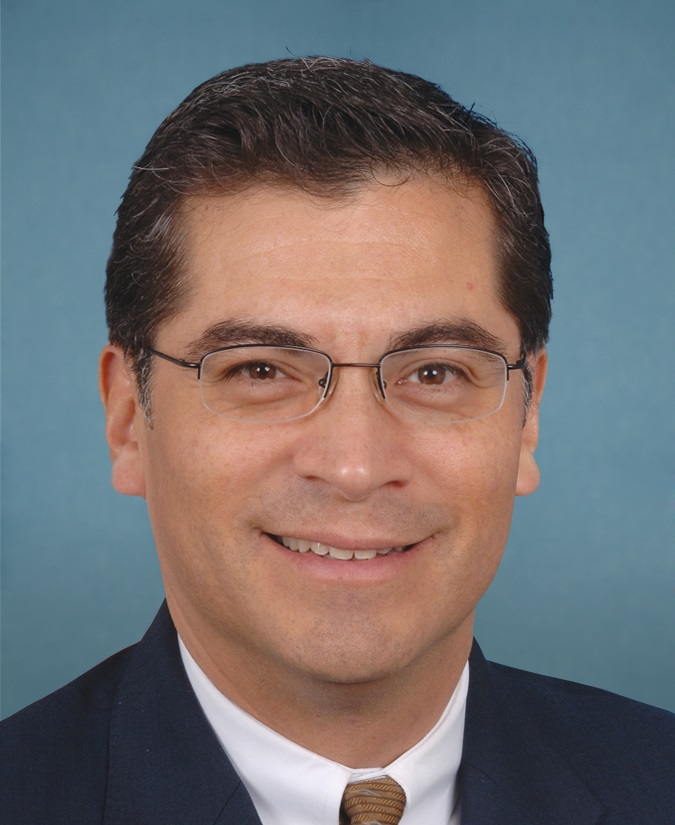

Nominee	Xavier Becerra	Tony Goss
Party	Democratic	Republican
Popular vote	83,223	11,788
Percentage	83.3%	11.8%
- County results Becerra: 80–90%
U.S. Representative before election
Xavier Becerra
Democratic
Elected U.S. Representative
Xavier Becerra
Democratic

California's 30th congressional district election, 2000
Party	Candidate	Votes	%
Democratic	Xavier Becerra (incumbent)	83,223	83.29
Republican	Tony Goss	11,788	11.80
Libertarian	Jason E. Heath	2,858	2.86
Natural Law	Gary D. Hearne	2,051	2.05
Invalid or blank votes		10,684	9.66
Total votes		110,604	100.00
Turnout			
Democratic hold			

== District 31 ==
2000 California's 31st congressional district election
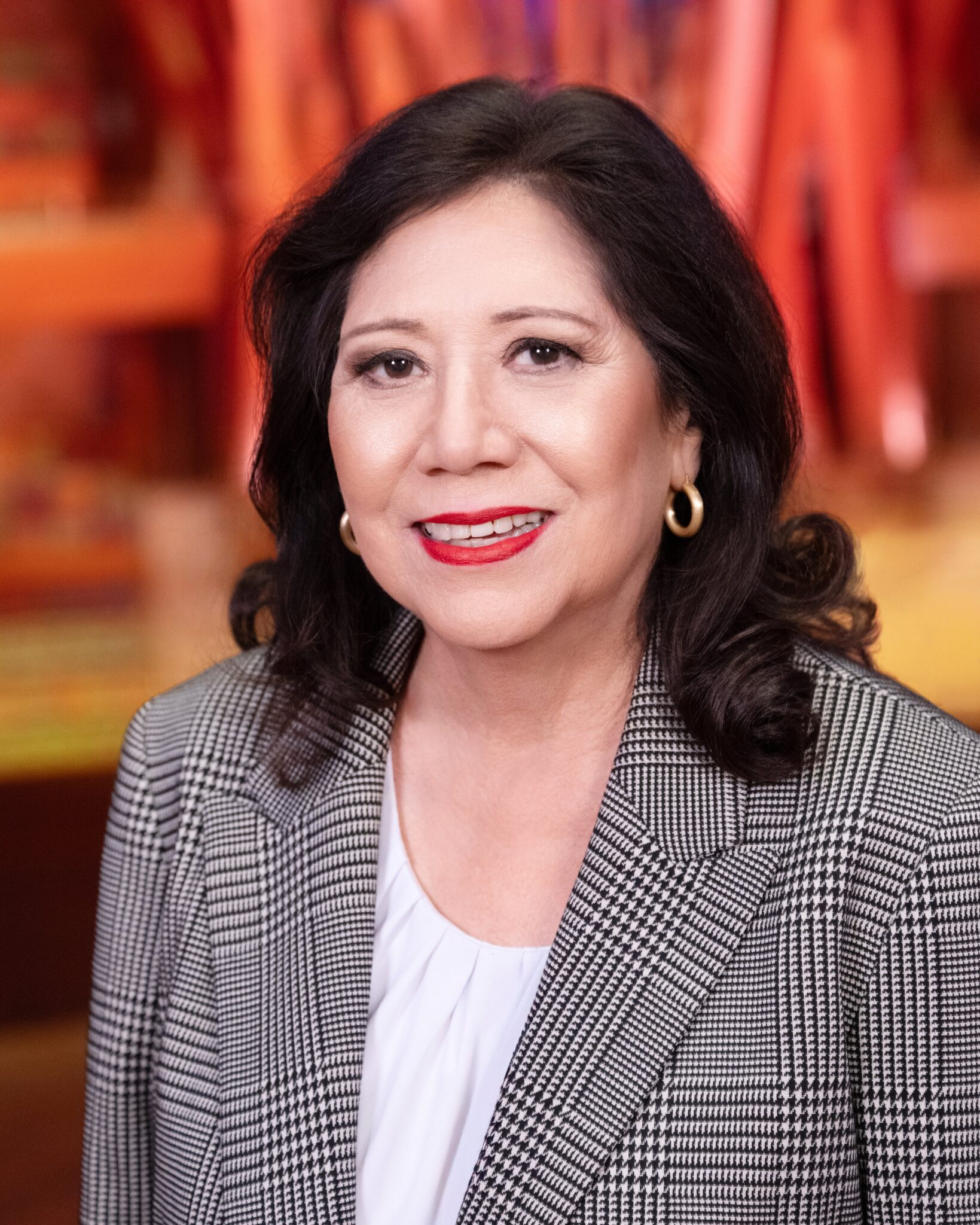

Nominee	Hilda Solis	Krista Lieberg-Wong	Michael McGuire
Party	Democratic	Green	Libertarian
Popular vote	89,600	10,294	7,138
Percentage	79.3%	9.1%	6.3%
Nominee	Richard D. Griffin
Party	Natural Law
Popular vote	5,882
Percentage	5.2%
- County results Solis: 70–80%
U.S. Representative before election
Matthew G. Martínez
Democratic
Elected U.S. Representative
Hilda Solis
Democratic

California's 31st congressional district election, 2000
Party	Candidate	Votes	%
Democratic	Hilda Solis	89,600	79.35
Green	Krista Lieberg-Wong	10,294	9.12
Libertarian	Michael McGuire	7,138	6.32
Natural Law	Richard D. Griffin	5,882	5.21
Invalid or blank votes		16,880	13.01
Total votes		129,794	100.00
Turnout			
Democratic gain from Republican			

== District 32 ==
2000 California's 32nd congressional district election
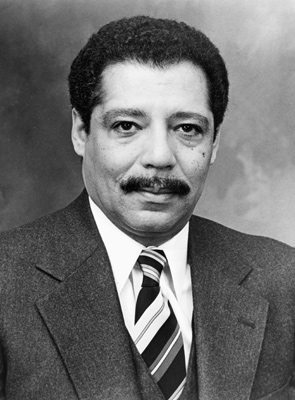

Nominee	Julian C. Dixon	Kathy Williamson
Party	Democratic	Republican
Popular vote	137,447	19,924
Percentage	83.5%	12.1%
- County results Dixon: 80–90%
U.S. Representative before election
Julian C. Dixon
Democratic
Elected U.S. Representative
Julian C. Dixon
Democratic

California's 32nd congressional district election, 2000
Party	Candidate	Votes	%
Democratic	Julian C. Dixon (incumbent)	137,447	83.54
Republican	Kathy Williamson	19,924	12.11
Libertarian	Bob Weber	3,875	2.36
Natural Law	Rashied Jibri	3,281	1.99
Invalid or blank votes		17,036	9.38
Total votes		181,563	100.00
Turnout			
Democratic hold			

== District 33 ==
2000 California's 33rd congressional district election
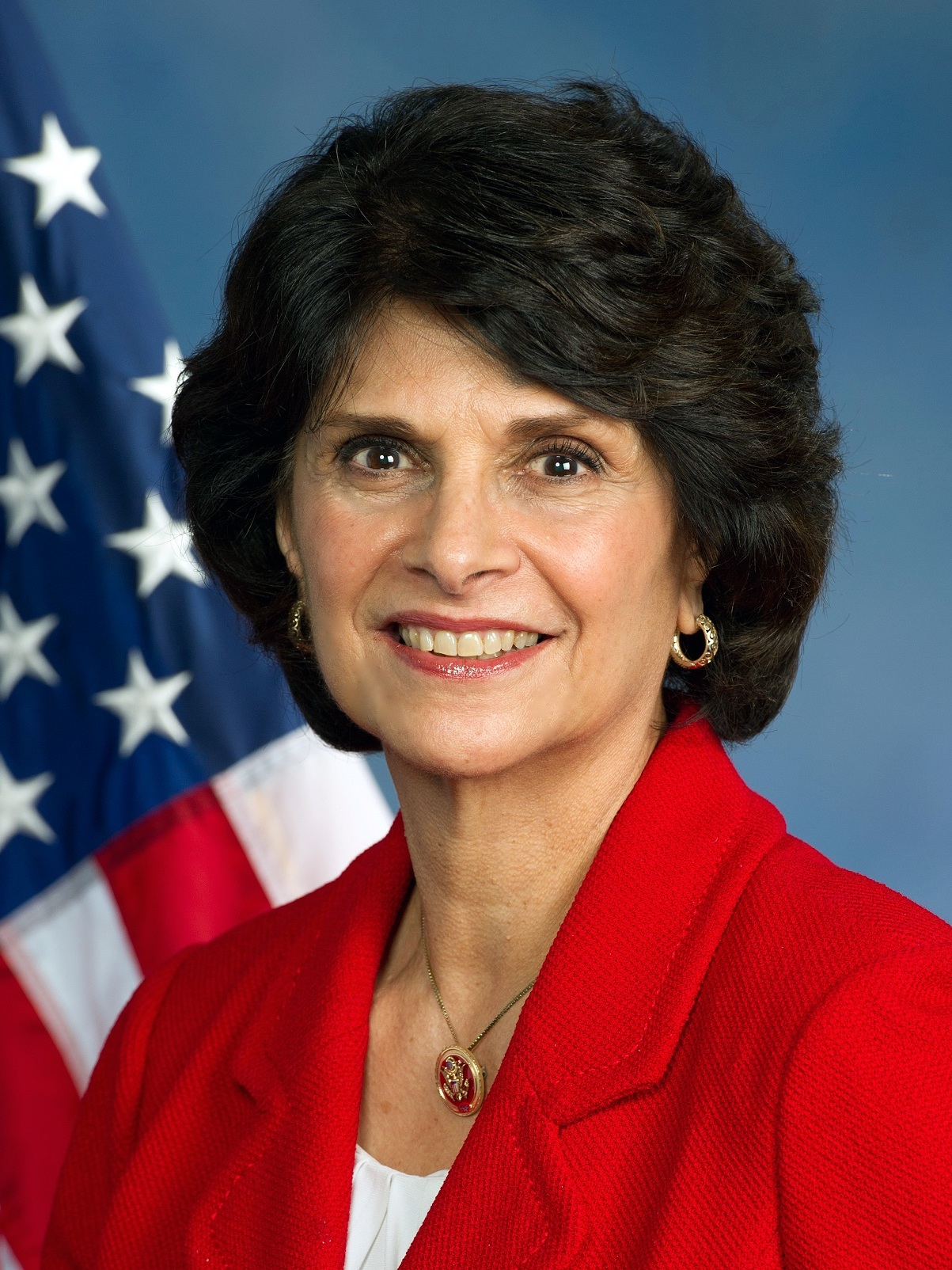

Nominee	Lucille Roybal-Allard	Wayne Miller
Party	Democratic	Republican
Popular vote	60,510	8,260
Percentage	84.5%	11.5%
- County results Roybal-Allard: 80–90%
U.S. Representative before election
Lucille Roybal-Allard
Democratic
Elected U.S. Representative
Lucille Roybal-Allard
Democratic

California's 33rd congressional district election, 2000
Party	Candidate	Votes	%
Democratic	Lucille Roybal-Allard (incumbent)	60,510	84.55
Republican	Wayne Miller	8,260	11.54
Libertarian	Nathan Thomas Craddock	1,601	2.24
Natural Law	William Harpur	1,200	1.68
Invalid or blank votes		8,762	10.91
Total votes		80,333	100.00
Turnout			
Democratic hold			

== District 34 ==
2000 California's 34th congressional district election
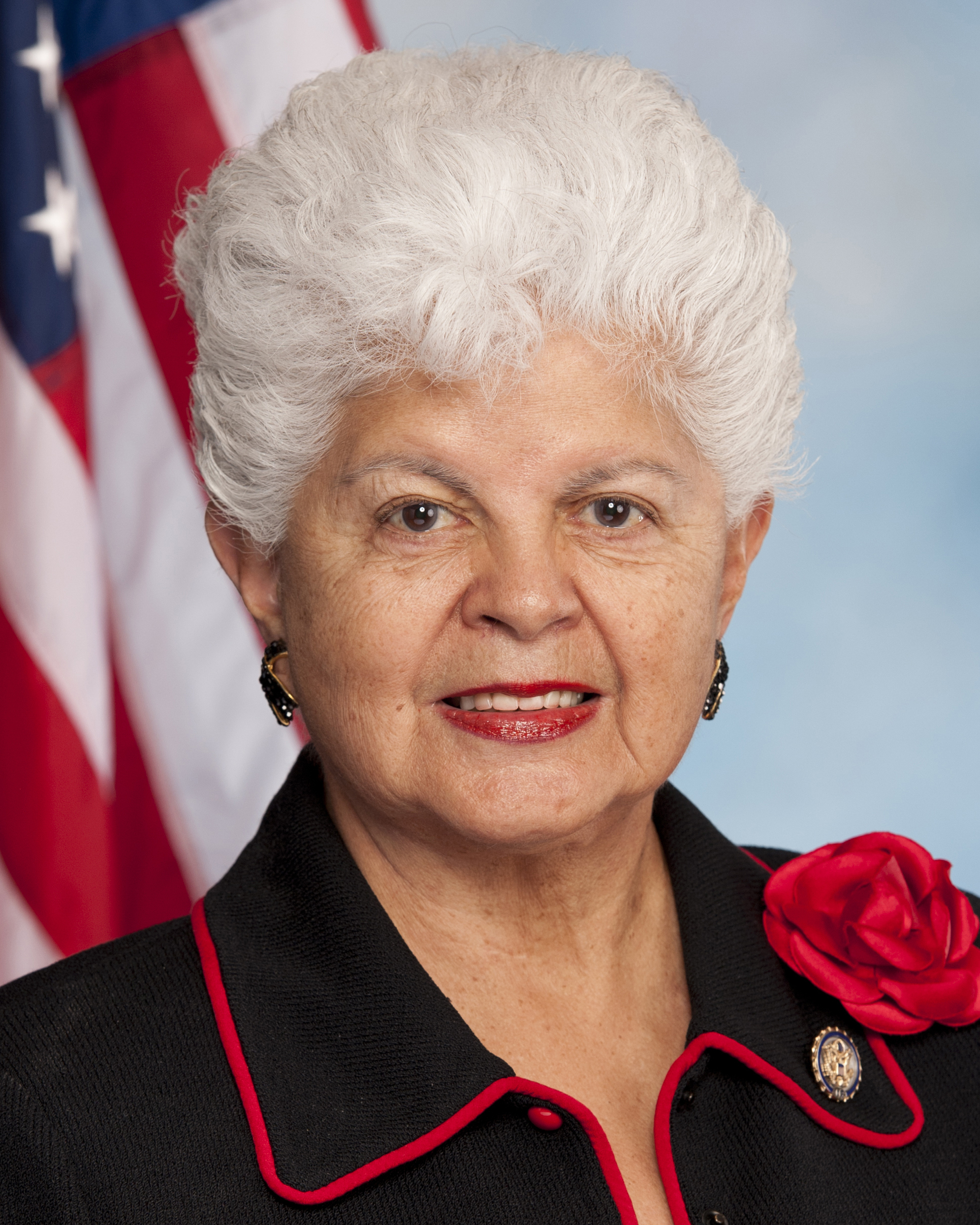

Nominee	Grace Napolitano	Robert Arthur Canales	Julia F. Simon
Party	Democratic	Republican	Natural Law
Popular vote	105,980	33,445	9,262
Percentage	71.3%	22.5%	6.2%
- County results Napolitano: 70–80%
U.S. Representative before election
Grace Napolitano
Democratic
Elected U.S. Representative
Grace Napolitano
Democratic

California's 34th congressional district election, 2000
Party	Candidate	Votes	%
Democratic	Grace Napolitano (incumbent)	105,980	71.26
Republican	Robert Arthur Canales	33,445	22.49
Natural Law	Julia F. Simon	9,262	6.23
No party	John W. Brantuk (write-in)	36	0.02
Invalid or blank votes		15,360	9.36
Total votes		164,083	100.00
Turnout			
Democratic hold			

== District 35 ==
2000 California's 35th congressional district election
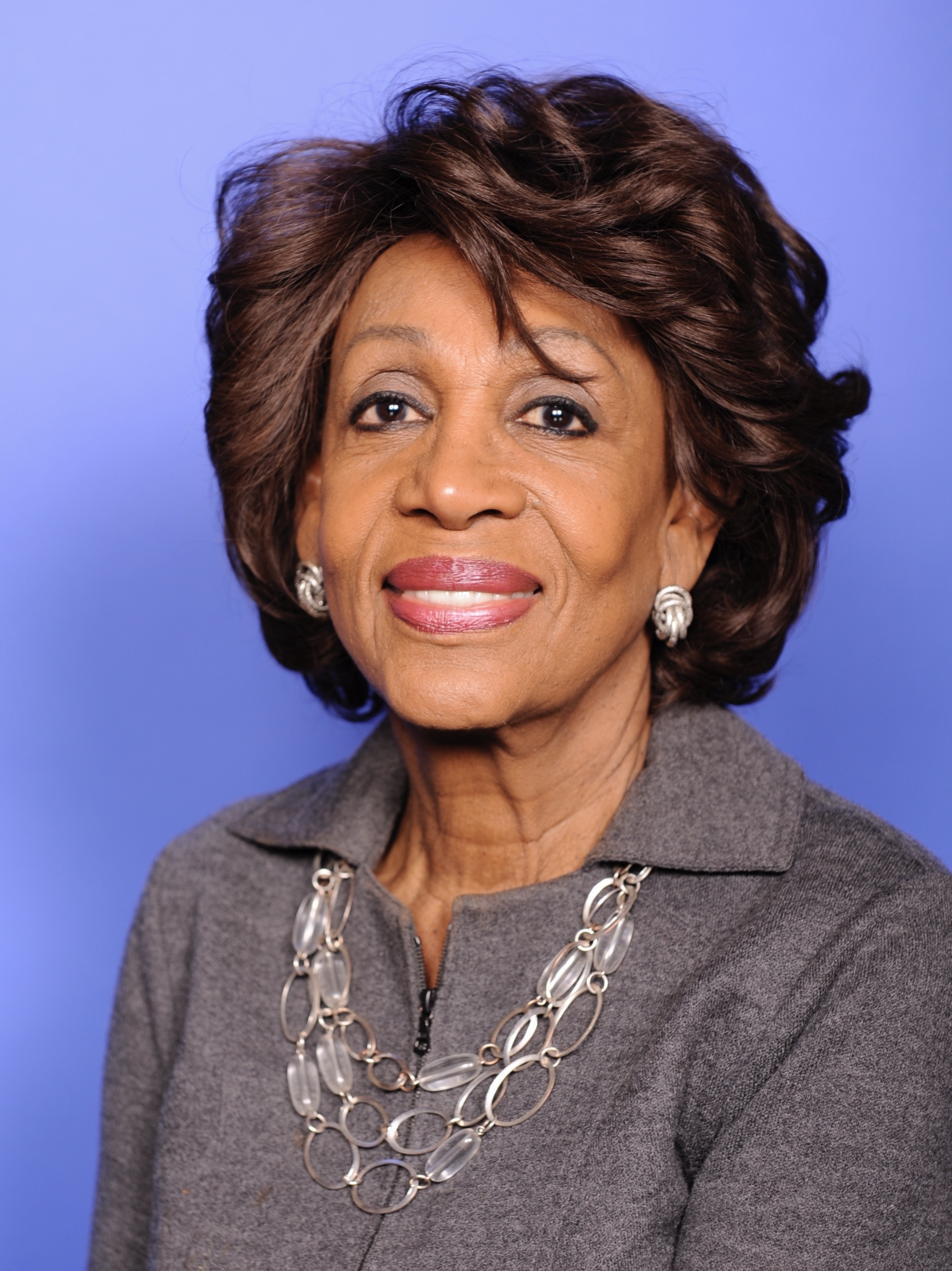

Nominee	Maxine Waters	Carl McGill
Party	Democratic	Republican
Popular vote	100,569	12,582
Percentage	86.5%	10.8%
- County results Waters: 80–90%
U.S. Representative before election
Maxine Waters
Democratic
Elected U.S. Representative
Maxine Waters
Democratic

California's 35th congressional district election, 2000
Party	Candidate	Votes	%
Democratic	Maxine Waters (incumbent)	100,569	86.54
Republican	Carl McGill	12,582	10.83
American Independent	Gordon Michael Mego	1,911	1.64
Natural Law	Rick Dunstan	1,153	0.99
Invalid or blank votes		10,351	8.18
Total votes		126,566	100.00
Turnout			
Democratic hold			

== District 36 ==
2000 California's 36th congressional district election
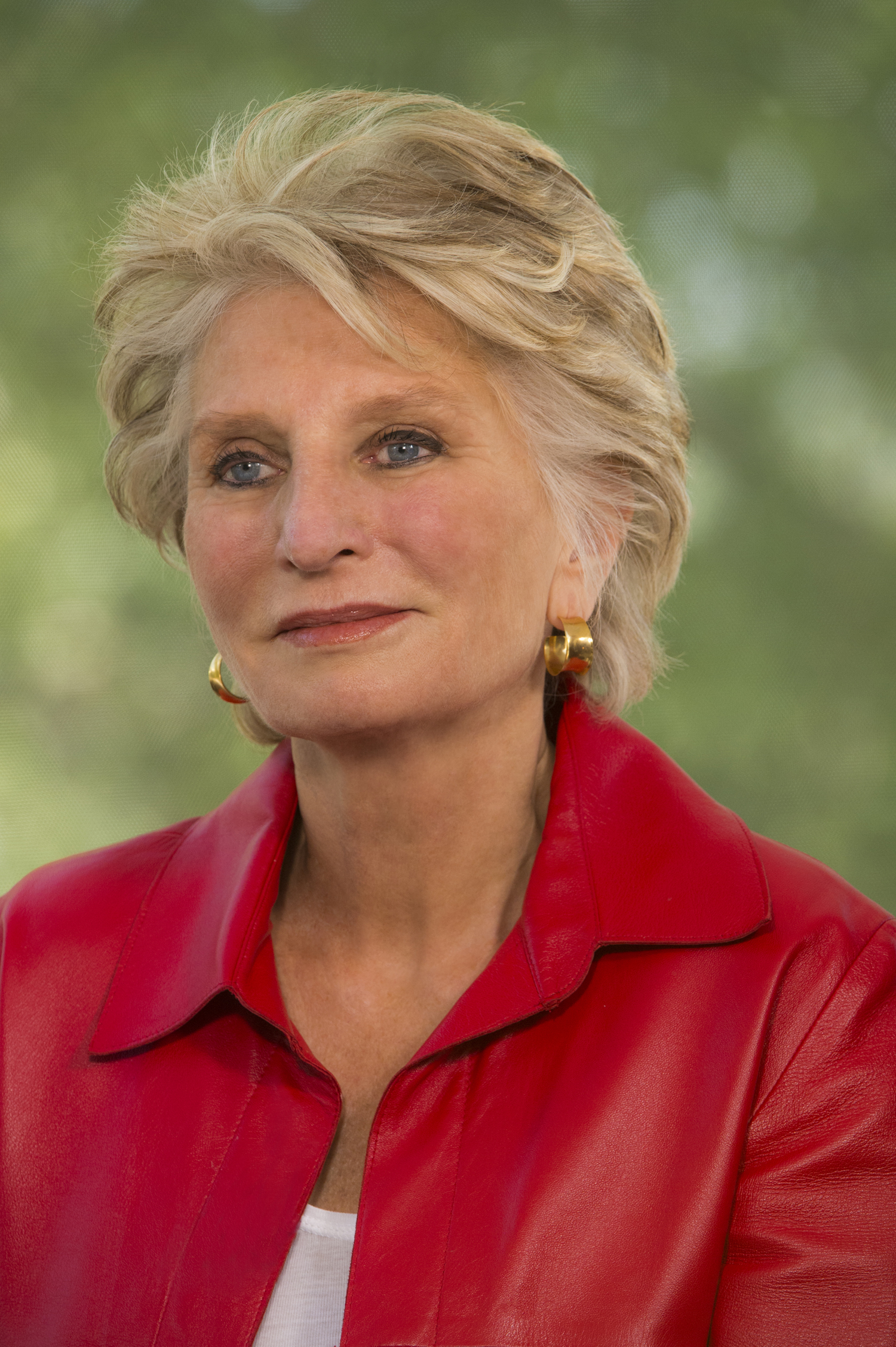

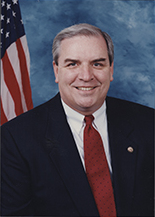
Nominee	Jane Harman	Steven T. Kuykendall
Party	Democratic	Republican
Popular vote	115,651	111,199
Percentage	48.4%	46.5%
- County results Harman: 40–50%
U.S. Representative before election
Steven T. Kuykendall
Republican
Elected U.S. Representative
Jane Harman
Democratic

California's 36th congressional district election, 2000
Party	Candidate	Votes	%
Democratic	Jane Harman	115,651	48.36
Republican	Steven T. Kuykendall (incumbent)	111,199	46.50
Libertarian	Daniel R. Sherman	6,073	2.54
Reform	John R. Konopka	3,549	1.48
Natural Law	Matt Ornati	2,264	0.95
No party	William D. Davies (write-in)	395	0.17
Invalid or blank votes		15,254	6.00
Total votes		254,385	100.00
Turnout			
Democratic gain from Republican			

== District 37 ==
2000 California's 37th congressional district election
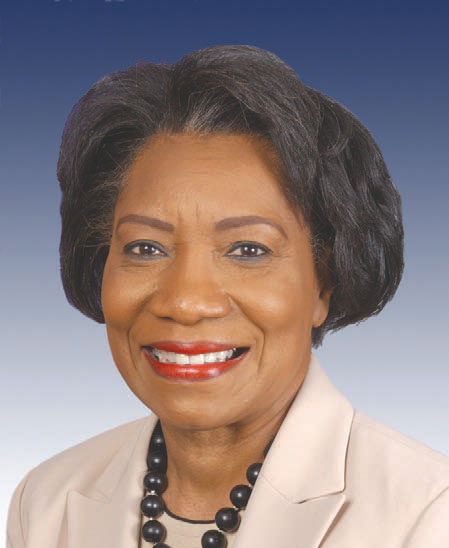

Nominee	Juanita Millender-McDonald	Vernon Van
Party	Democratic	Republican
Popular vote	93,269	12,762
Percentage	82.3%	11.3%
- County results Millender-McDonald: 80–90%
U.S. Representative before election
Juanita Millender-McDonald
Democratic
Elected U.S. Representative
Juanita Millender-McDonald
Democratic

California's 37th congressional district election, 2000
Party	Candidate	Votes	%
Democratic	Juanita Millender-McDonald (inc.)	93,269	82.34
Republican	Vernon Van	12,762	11.27
Natural Law	Margaret Glazer	4,094	3.61
Libertarian	Herb Peters	3,150	2.78
Invalid or blank votes		11,879	9.49
Total votes		125,154	100.00
Turnout			
Democratic hold			

== District 38 ==
2000 California's 38th congressional district election
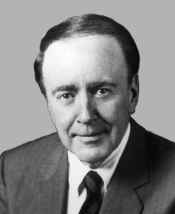

Nominee	Steve Horn	Gerrie Shcipske
Party	Republican	Democratic
Popular vote	87,266	85,498
Percentage	48.5%	47.5%
- County results Horn: 40–50%
U.S. Representative before election
Steve Horn
Republican
Elected U.S. Representative
Steve Horn
Republican

California's 38th congressional district election, 2000
Party	Candidate	Votes	%
Republican	Steve Horn (incumbent)	87,266	48.45
Democratic	Gerrie Shcipske	85,498	47.47
Natural Law	Karen Blasdell-Wilkinson	3,744	2.08
Libertarian	Jack Neglia	3,614	2.01
Invalid or blank votes		13,774	7.10
Total votes		193,896	100.00
Turnout			
Republican hold			

== District 39 ==
2000 California's 39th congressional district election
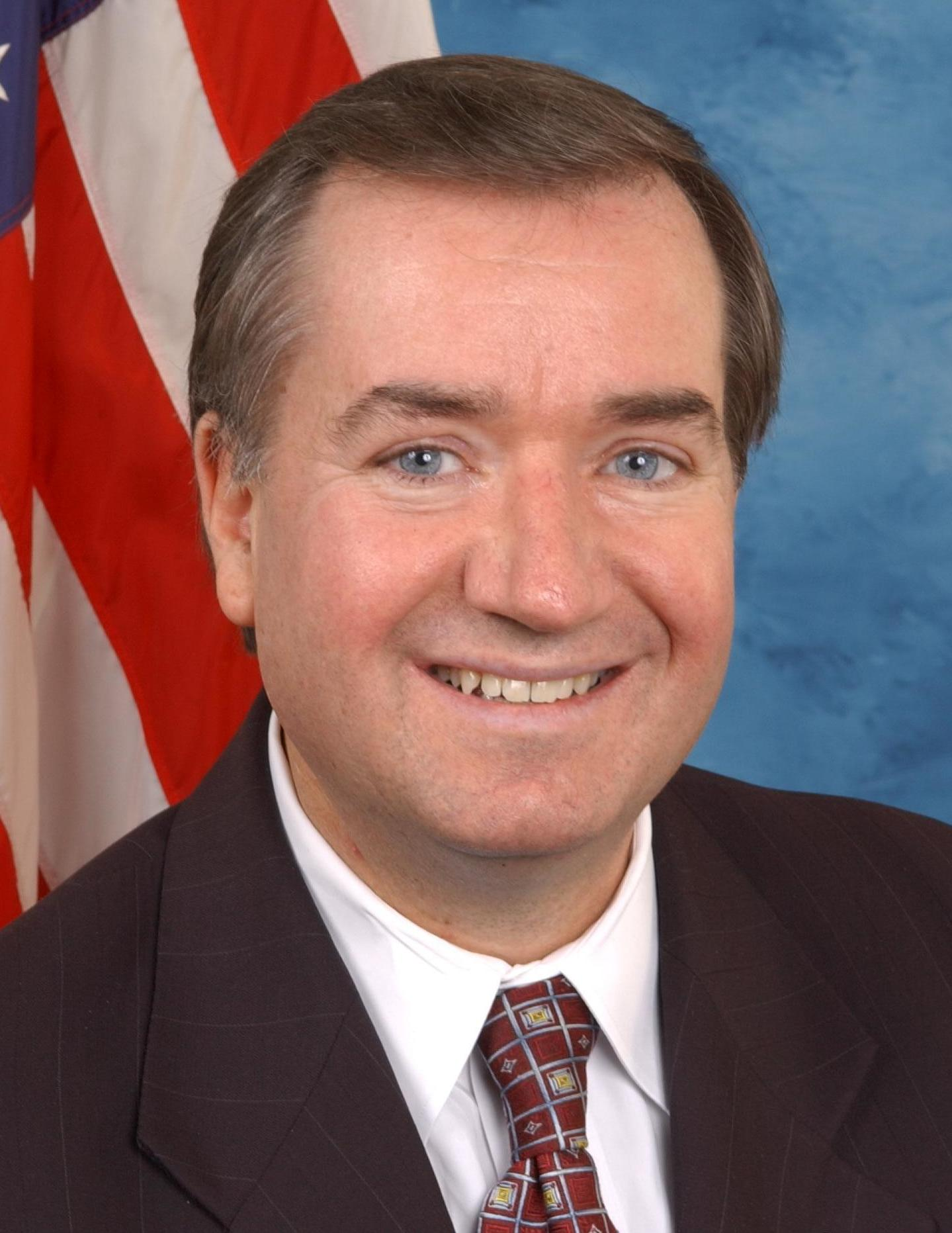

Nominee	Ed Royce	Gill G. Kanel
Party	Republican	Democratic
Popular vote	129,294	64,938
Percentage	62.7%	31.5%
- County results Royce: 50–60% 60–70%
U.S. Representative before election
Ed Royce
Republican
Elected U.S. Representative
Ed Royce
Republican

California's 39th congressional district election, 2000
Party	Candidate	Votes	%
Republican	Ed Royce (incumbent)	129,294	62.73
Democratic	Gill G. Kanel	64,938	31.51
Natural Law	Ron Jevning	6,597	3.20
Libertarian	Keith D. Gann	5,275	2.56
Invalid or blank votes		13,772	6.26
Total votes		219,876	100.00
Turnout			
Republican hold			

== District 40 ==
2000 California's 40th congressional district election
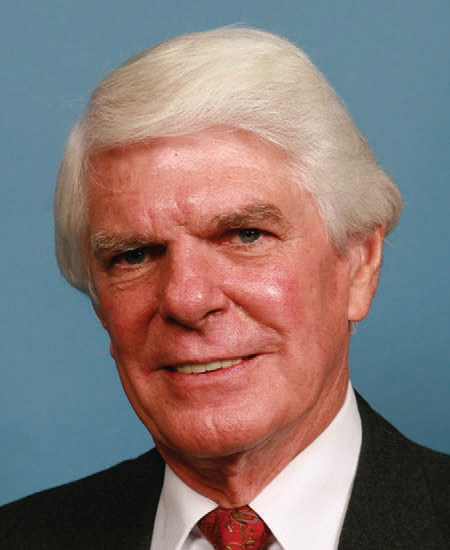

Nominee	Jerry Lewis	Frank N. Schmidt	Jay Lindberg
Party	Republican	Natural Law	Libertarian
Popular vote	151,069	19,029	18,924
Percentage	79.9%	10.1%	10.0%
- County results Lewis: 70–80% 80–90%
U.S. Representative before election
Jerry Lewis
Republican
Elected U.S. Representative
Jerry Lewis
Republican

California's 40th congressional district election, 2000
Party	Candidate	Votes	%
Republican	Jerry Lewis (incumbent)	151,069	79.92
Natural Law	Frank N. Schmidt	19,029	10.07
Libertarian	Jay Lindberg	18,924	10.01
Invalid or blank votes		629	0.33
Total votes		189,651	100.00
Turnout			
Republican hold			

== District 41 ==
2000 California's 41st congressional district election
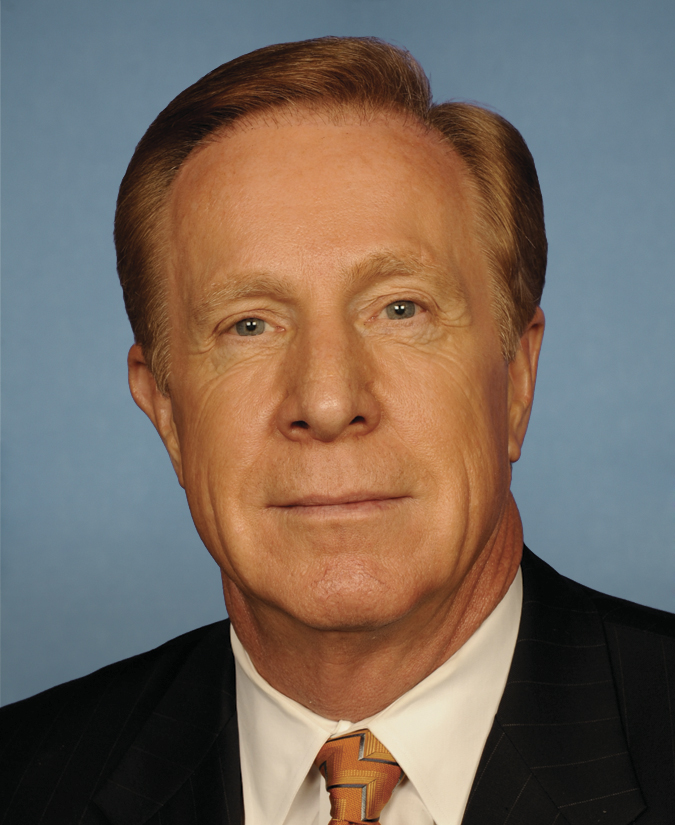

Nominee	Gary Miller	Rodolfo G. Favila
Party	Republican	Democratic
Popular vote	104,695	66,361
Percentage	58.9%	37.4%
- County results Miller: 40–50% 50–60% 70–80%
U.S. Representative before election
Gary Miller
Republican
Elected U.S. Representative
Gary Miller
Republican

California's 41st congressional district election, 2000
Party	Candidate	Votes	%
Republican	Gary Miller (incumbent)	104,695	58.93
Democratic	Rodolfo G. Favila	66,361	37.35
Natural Law	David Kramer	6,607	3.72
Invalid or blank votes		7,357	4.75
Total votes		154,973	100.00
Turnout			
Republican hold			

== District 42 ==
2000 California's 42nd congressional district election
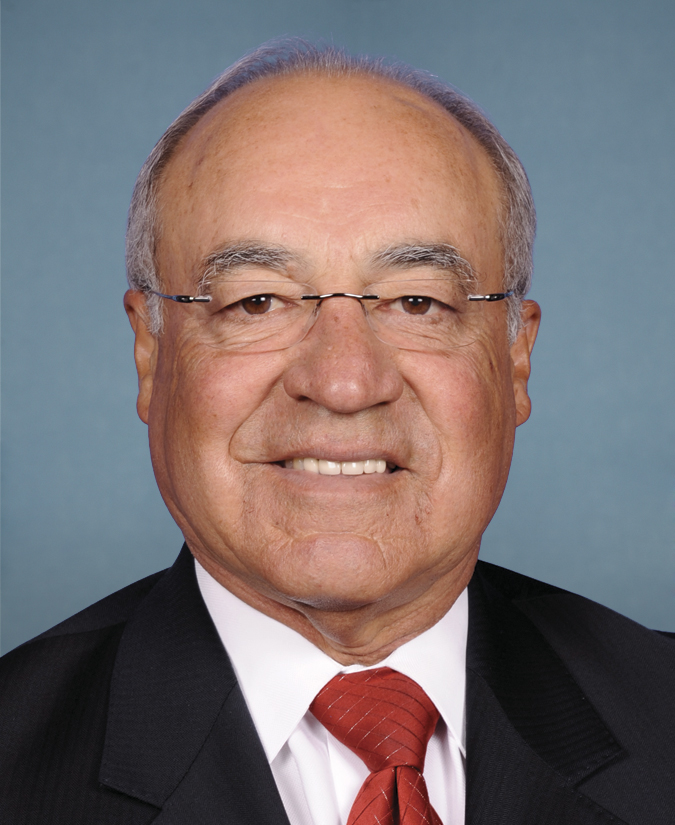

Nominee	Joe Baca	Eli Pirozzi
Party	Democratic	Republican
Popular vote	90,585	53,239
Percentage	59.8%	35.1%
- County results Baca: 50–60%
U.S. Representative before election
Joe Baca
Democratic
Elected U.S. Representative
Joe Baca
Democratic

California's 42nd congressional district election, 2000
Party	Candidate	Votes	%
Democratic	Joe Baca (incumbent)	90,585	59.76
Republican	Eli Pirozzi	53,239	35.12
Libertarian	John "Scott" Ballard	4,059	2.68
Natural Law	Gwyn Hartley	3,694	2.44
Invalid or blank votes		0	0.00
Total votes		151,577	100.00
Turnout			
Democratic hold			

== District 43 ==
2000 California's 43rd congressional district election
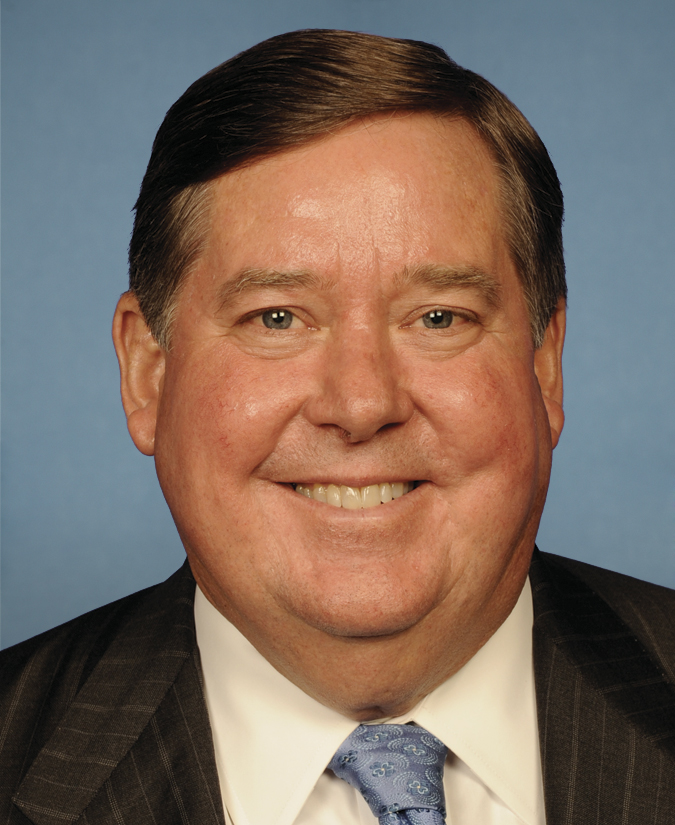

Nominee	Ken Calvert	Bill Reed	Nat Adam
Party	Republican	Libertarian	Natural Law
Popular vote	140,201	29,755	20,376
Percentage	73.7%	15.6%	10.7%
- County results Calvert: 70–80%
U.S. Representative before election
Ken Calvert
Republican
Elected U.S. Representative
Ken Calvert
Republican

California's 43rd congressional district election, 2000
Party	Candidate	Votes	%
Republican	Ken Calvert (incumbent)	140,201	73.66
Libertarian	Bill Reed	29,755	15.63
Natural Law	Nat Adam	20,376	10.71
Invalid or blank votes		0	0.00
Total votes		190,332	100.00
Turnout			
Republican hold			

== District 44 ==
2000 California's 44th congressional district election
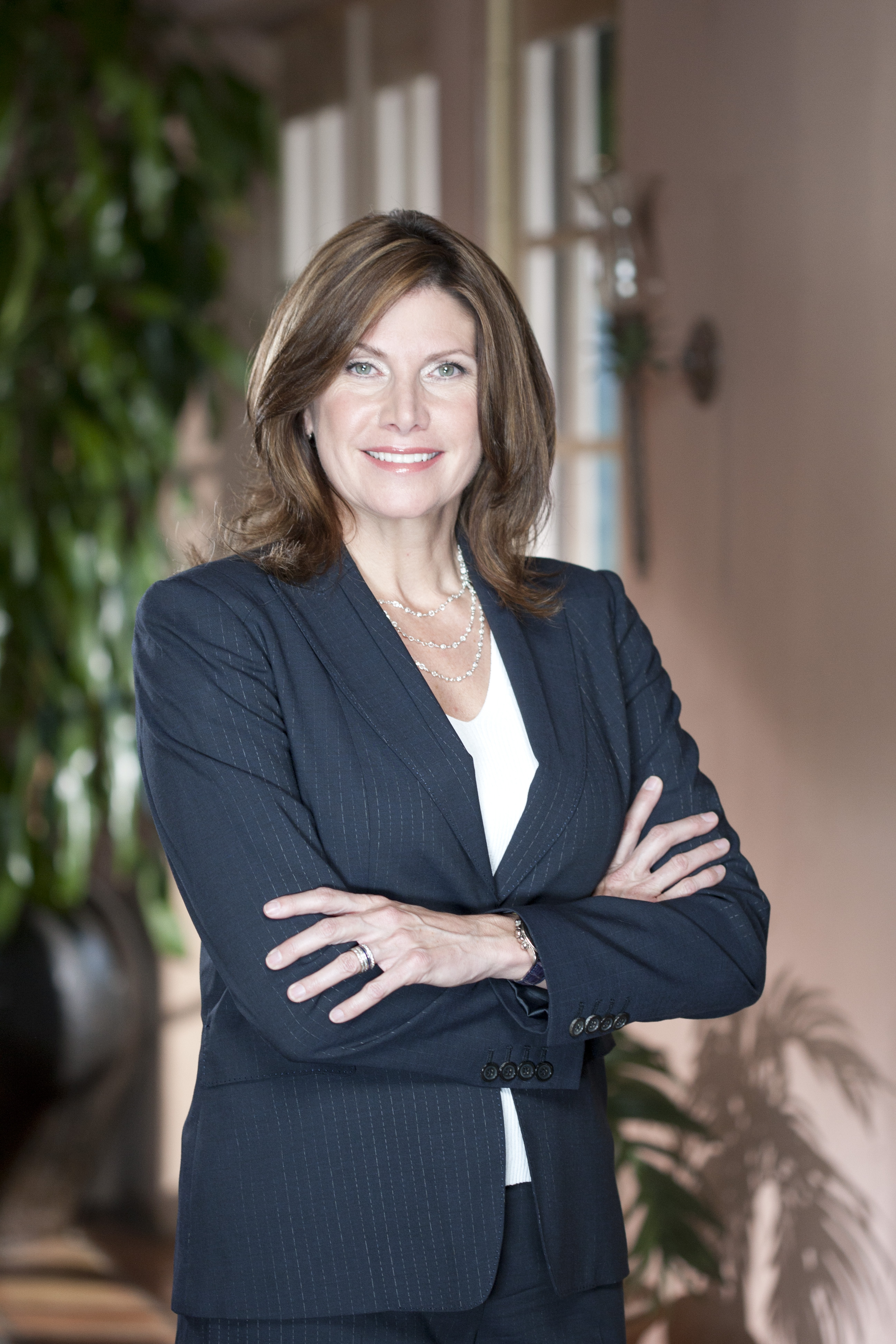

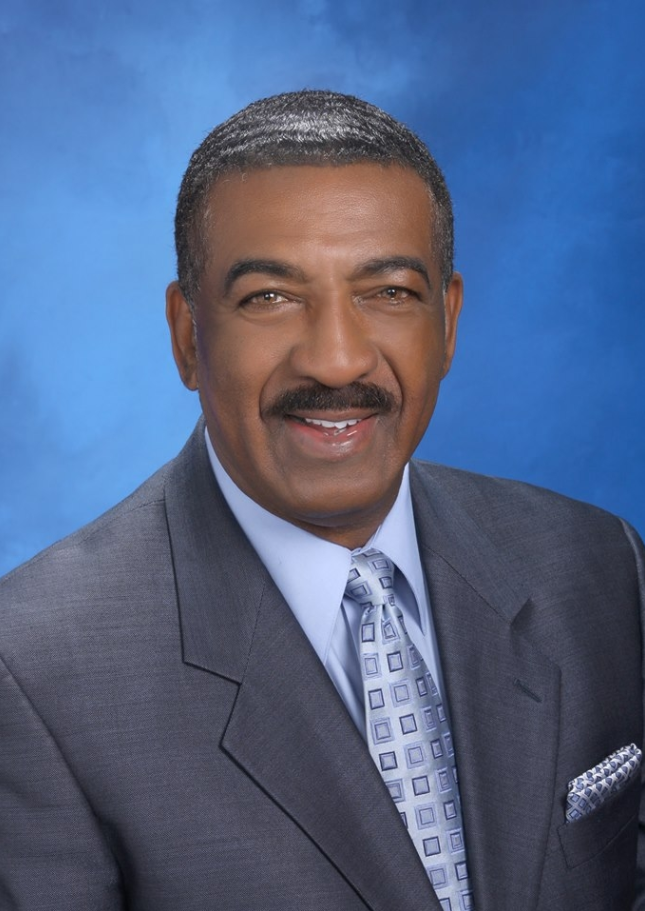
Nominee	Mary Bono	Ron Oden
Party	Republican	Democratic
Popular vote	123,738	79,302
Percentage	59.1%	37.9%
- County results Bono: 50–60%
U.S. Representative before election
Mary Bono
Republican
Elected U.S. Representative
Mary Bono
Republican

California's 44th congressional district election, 2000
Party	Candidate	Votes	%
Republican	Mary Bono (incumbent)	123,738	59.15
Democratic	Ron Oden	79,302	37.91
Reform	Gene Smith	4,135	1.98
Natural Law	Jim Meuer	2,012	0.96
No party	Harry Merker (write-in)	0	0.00
Invalid or blank votes		0	0.00
Total votes		209,187	100.00
Turnout			
Republican hold			

== District 45 ==
2000 California's 45th congressional district election
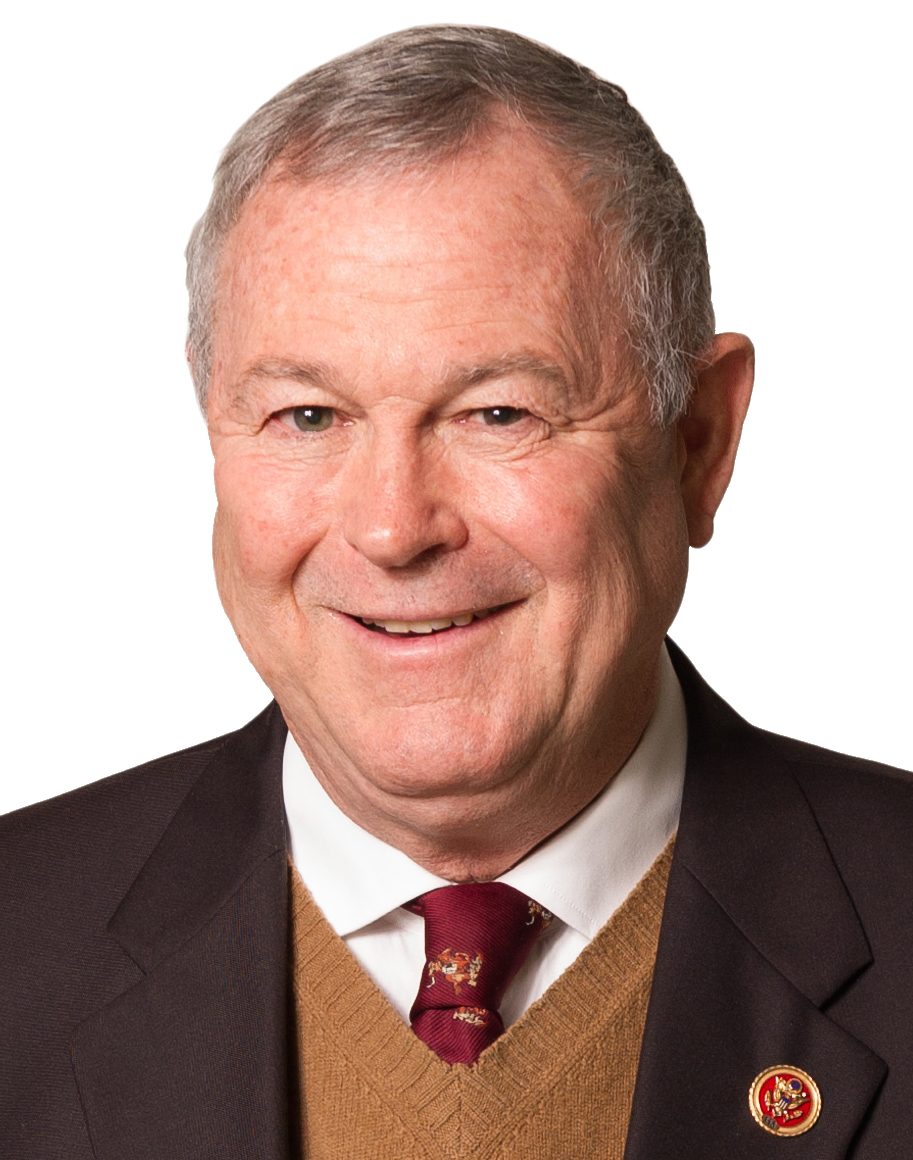

Nominee	Dana Rohrabacher	Ted Crisell
Party	Republican	Democratic
Popular vote	136,275	71,066
Percentage	62.1%	32.4%
- County results Rohrabacher: 60–70%
U.S. Representative before election
Dana Rohrabacher
Republican
Elected U.S. Representative
Dana Rohrabacher
Republican

California's 45th congressional district election, 2000
Party	Candidate	Votes	%
Republican	Dana Rohrabacher (incumbent)	136,275	62.12
Democratic	Ted Crisell	71,066	32.39
Libertarian	Don Hull	8,409	3.83
Natural Law	Constance Betton	3,635	1.66
Invalid or blank votes		12,927	5.56
Total votes		232,312	100.00
Turnout			
Republican hold			

== District 46 ==
2000 California's 46th congressional district election
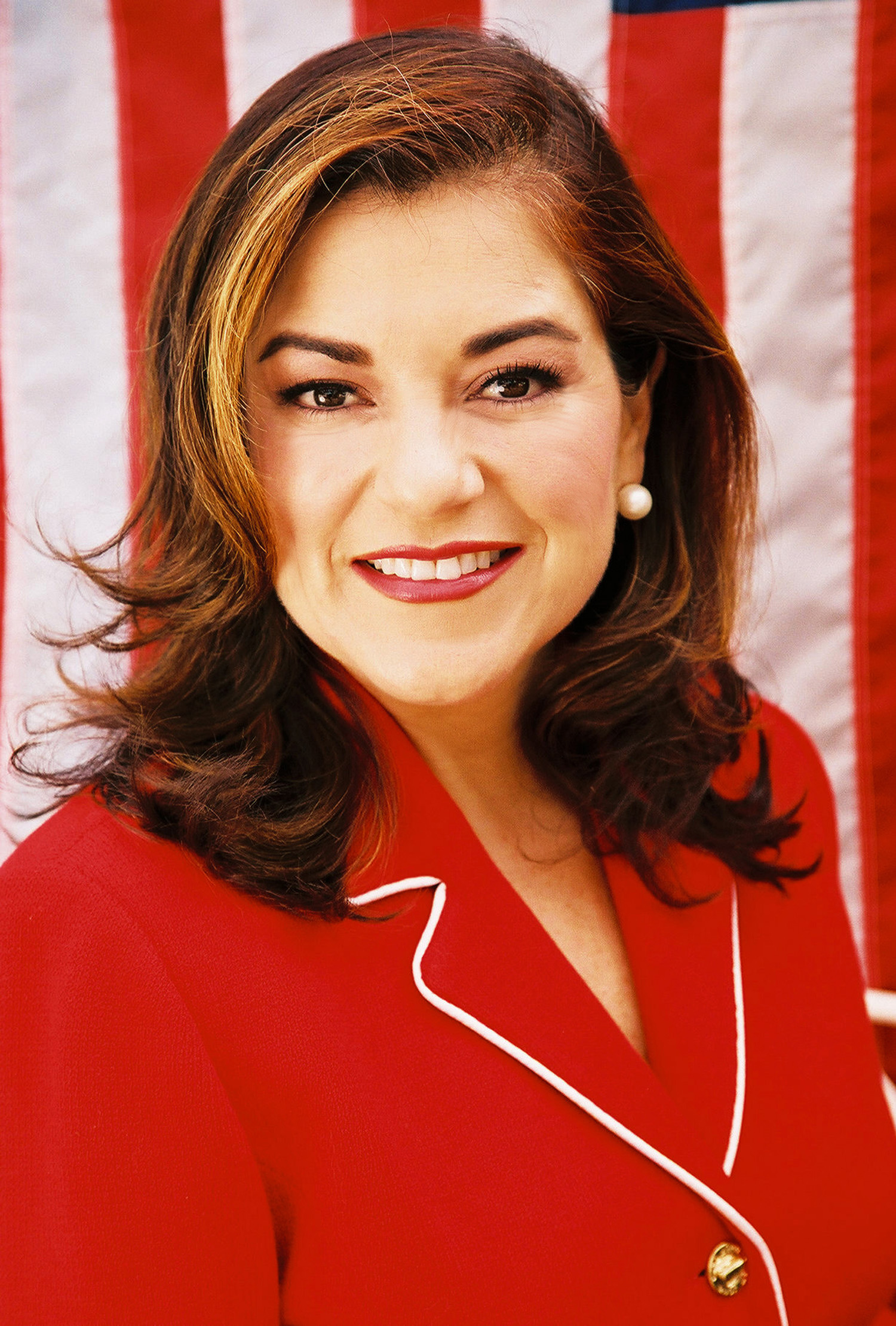

Nominee	Loretta Sanchez	Gloria Matta Tuchman
Party	Democratic	Republican
Popular vote	70,381	40,928
Percentage	60.2%	35.0%
- County results Sanchez: 60–70%
U.S. Representative before election
Loretta Sanchez
Democratic
Elected U.S. Representative
Loretta Sanchez
Democratic

California's 46th congressional district election, 2000
Party	Candidate	Votes	%
Democratic	Loretta Sanchez (incumbent)	70,381	60.20
Republican	Gloria Matta Tuchman	40,928	35.01
Libertarian	Richard B. Boddie	3,159	2.70
Natural Law	Larry Engwall	2,440	2.09
Invalid or blank votes		3,967	3.28
Total votes		120,875	100.00
Turnout			
Democratic hold			

== District 47 ==
2000 California's 47th congressional district election
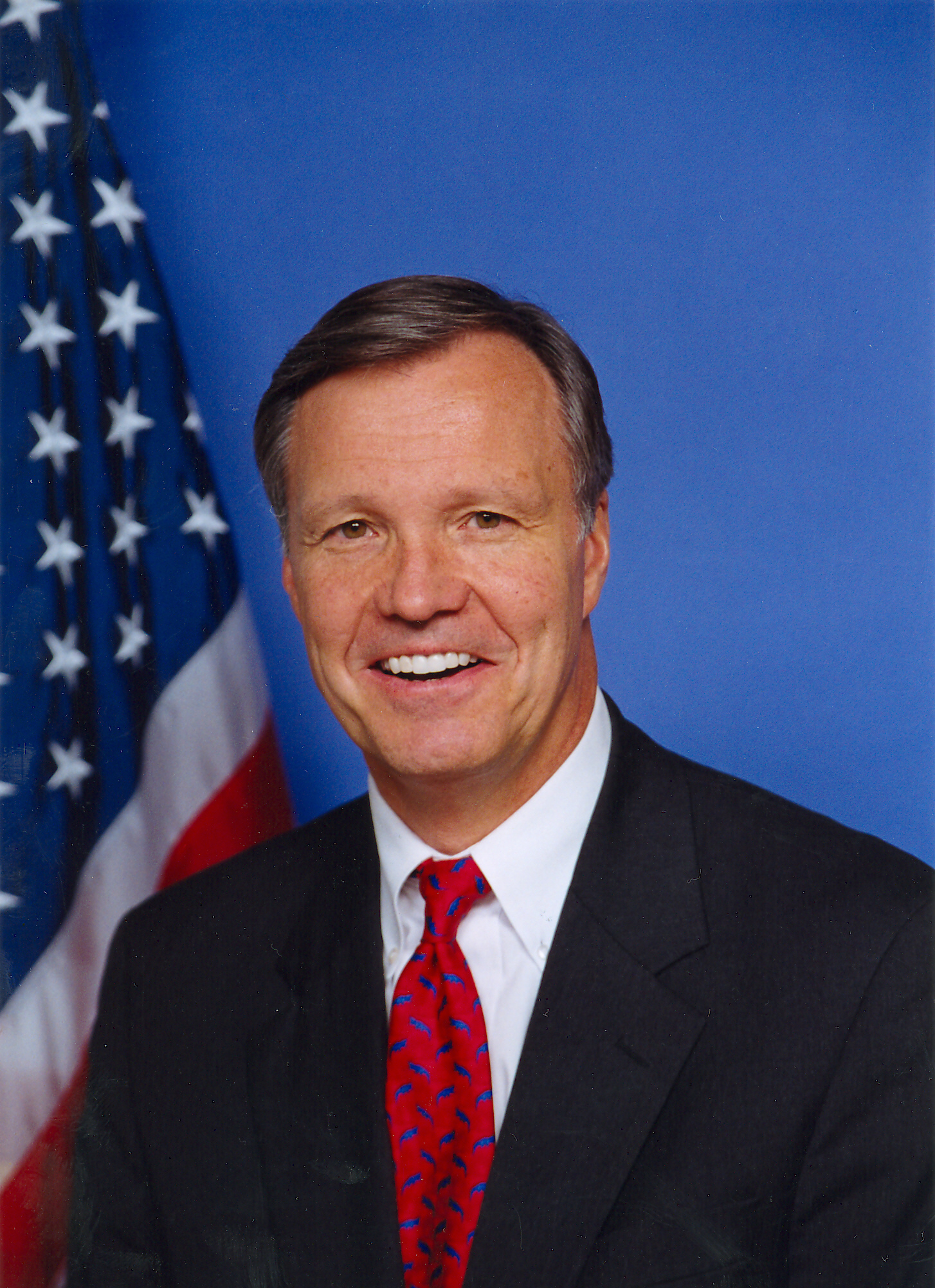

Nominee	Christopher Cox	John Graham
Party	Republican	Democratic
Popular vote	181,365	83,186
Percentage	65.6%	30.1%
- County results Cox: 60–70%
U.S. Representative before election
Christopher Cox
Republican
Elected U.S. Representative
Christopher Cox
Republican

California's 47th congressional district election, 2000
Party	Candidate	Votes	%
Republican	Christopher Cox (incumbent)	181,365	65.62
Democratic	John Graham	83,186	30.10
Libertarian	David F. Nolan	8,081	2.92
Natural Law	Iris Adam	3,769	1.36
Invalid or blank votes		14,151	4.87
Total votes		290,552	100.00
Turnout			
Republican hold			

== District 48 ==
2000 California's 48th congressional district election
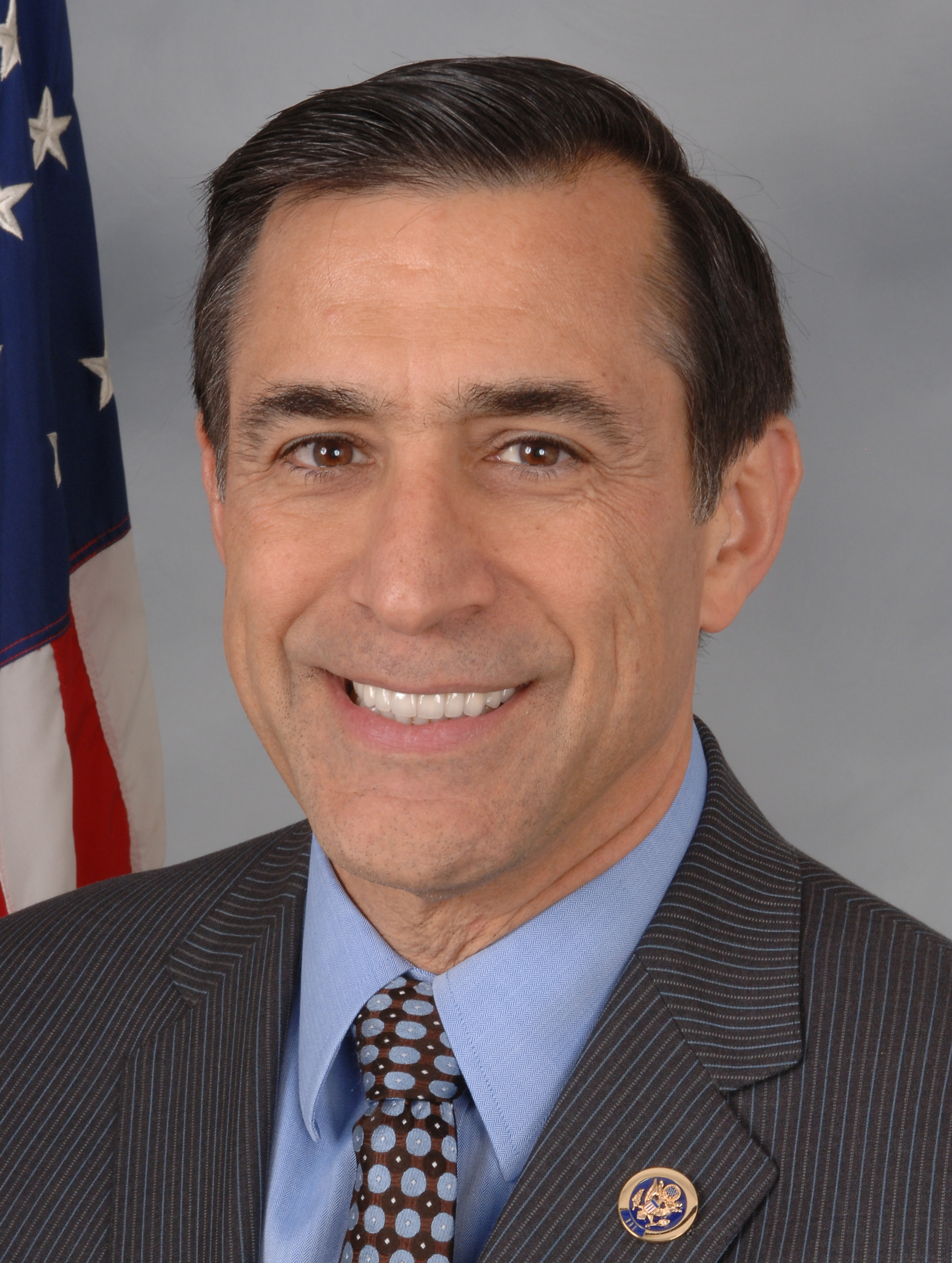

Nominee	Darrell Issa	Peter Kouvelis
Party	Republican	Democratic
Popular vote	160,627	74,073
Percentage	61.4%	28.3%
- County results Issa: 50–60% 60–70%
U.S. Representative before election
Ron Packard
Republican
Elected U.S. Representative
Darrell Issa
Republican

California's 48th congressional district election, 2000
Party	Candidate	Votes	%
Republican	Darrell Issa	160,627	61.43
Democratic	Peter Kouvelis	74,073	28.33
Reform	Eddie Rose	11,240	4.30
Natural Law	Sharon K. Miles	8,269	3.16
Libertarian	Joe Michael Cobb	7,269	2.78
Invalid or blank votes		21,024	7.44
Total votes		282,502	100.00
Turnout			
Republican hold			

== District 49 ==
2000 California's 49th congressional district election
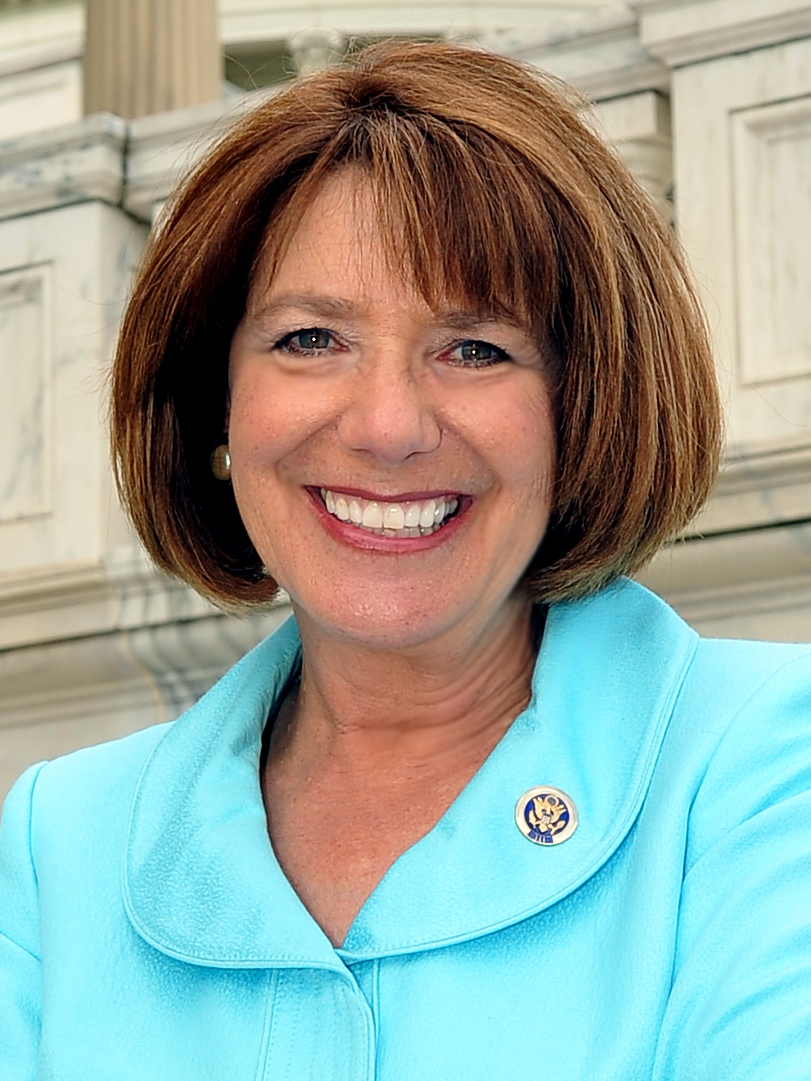

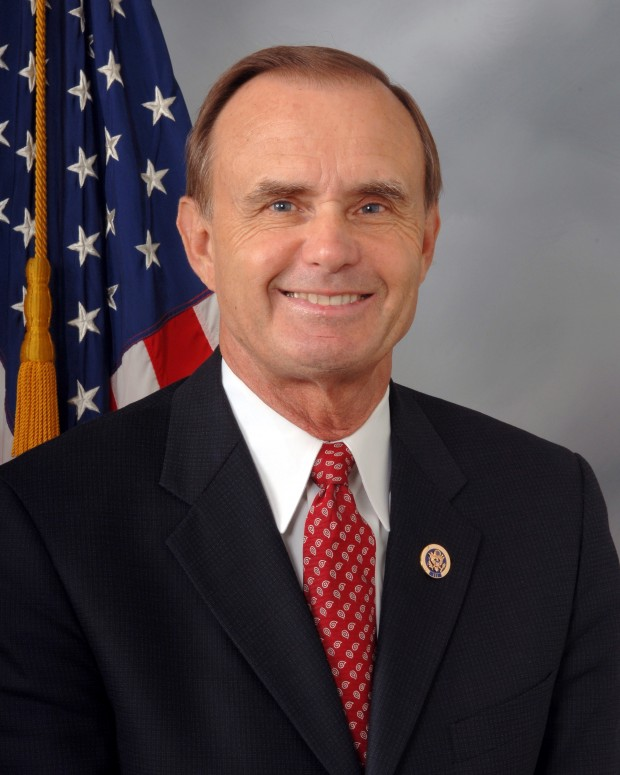
Nominee	Susan Davis	Brian Bilbray
Party	Democratic	Republican
Popular vote	113,400	105,515
Percentage	49.6%	46.2%
- County results Davis: 40–50%
U.S. Representative before election
Brian Bilbray
Republican
Elected U.S. Representative
Susan Davis
Democratic

=== General election ===
==== Polling ====
Poll source	Date(s)	Sample size	Margin of error	Brian Bilbray (R)	Susan Davis (D)	Other / undecided (Note: Calculated by taking the difference of 100% and all other candidates combined.)
SurveyUSA	November 1, 2000	500	—	45%	47%	8%

==== Results ====
California's 49th congressional district election, 2000
Party	Candidate	Votes	%
Democratic	Susan Davis	113,400	49.63
Republican	Brian Bilbray (incumbent)	105,515	46.18
Libertarian	Doris Ball	6,526	2.86
Natural Law	Tahir I. Bhatti	3,048	1.33
Invalid or blank votes		11,805	4.91
Total votes		240,294	100.00
Turnout			
Democratic gain from Republican			

== District 50 ==
2000 California's 50th congressional district election
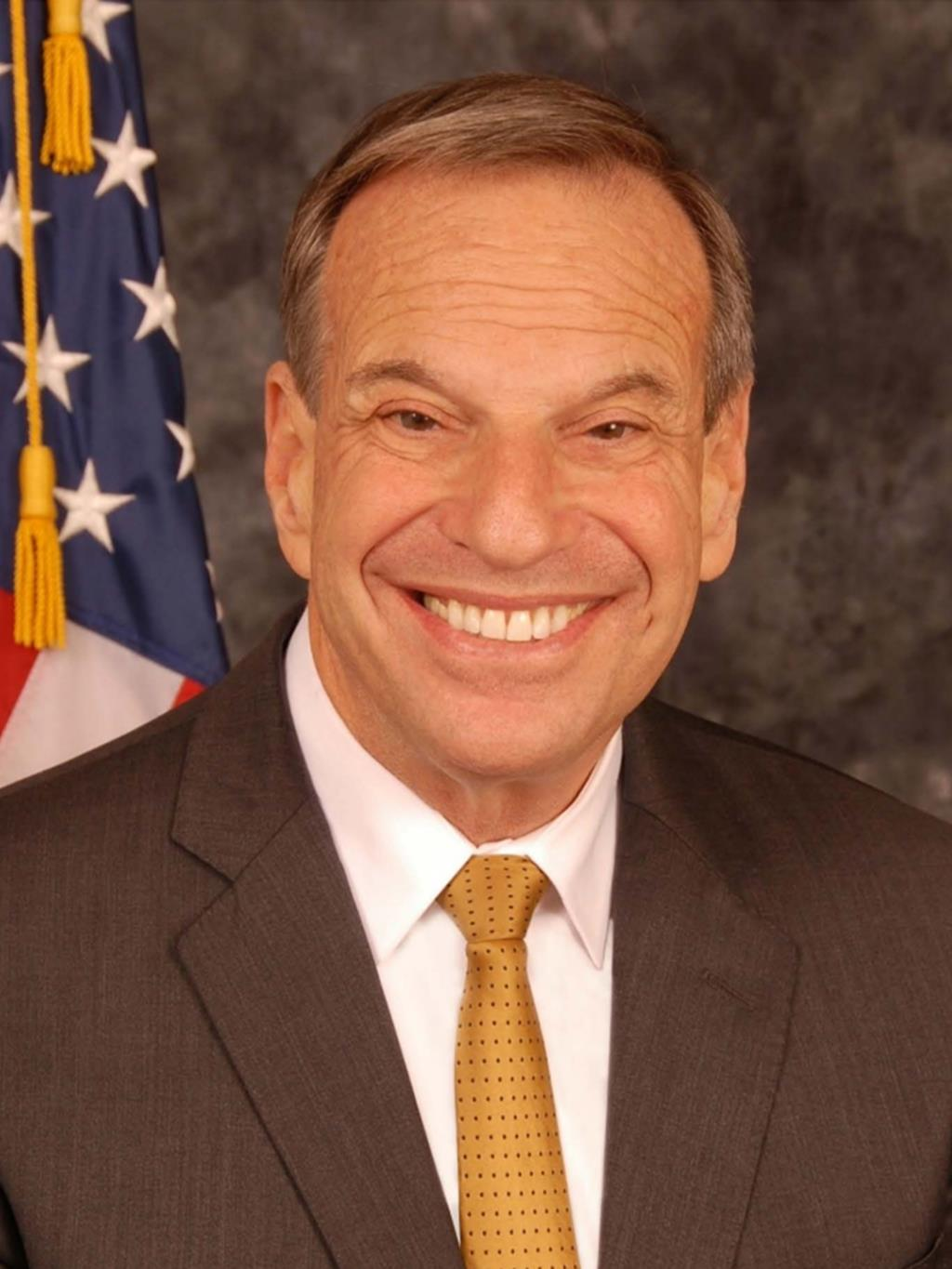

Nominee	Bob Filner	Bob Divine
Party	Democratic	Republican
Popular vote	95,191	38,526
Percentage	68.3%	27.6%
- County results Filner: 60–70%
U.S. Representative before election
Bob Filner
Democratic
Elected U.S. Representative
Bob Filner
Democratic

California's 50th congressional district election, 2000
Party	Candidate	Votes	%
Democratic	Bob Filner (incumbent)	95,191	68.25
Republican	Bob Divine	38,526	27.62
Libertarian	David A. Willoughby	3,472	2.49
Natural Law	LeAnn S. Kendall	2,283	1.64
Invalid or blank votes		9,533	6.40
Total votes		149,005	100.00
Turnout			
Democratic hold			

== District 51 ==
2000 California's 51st congressional district election
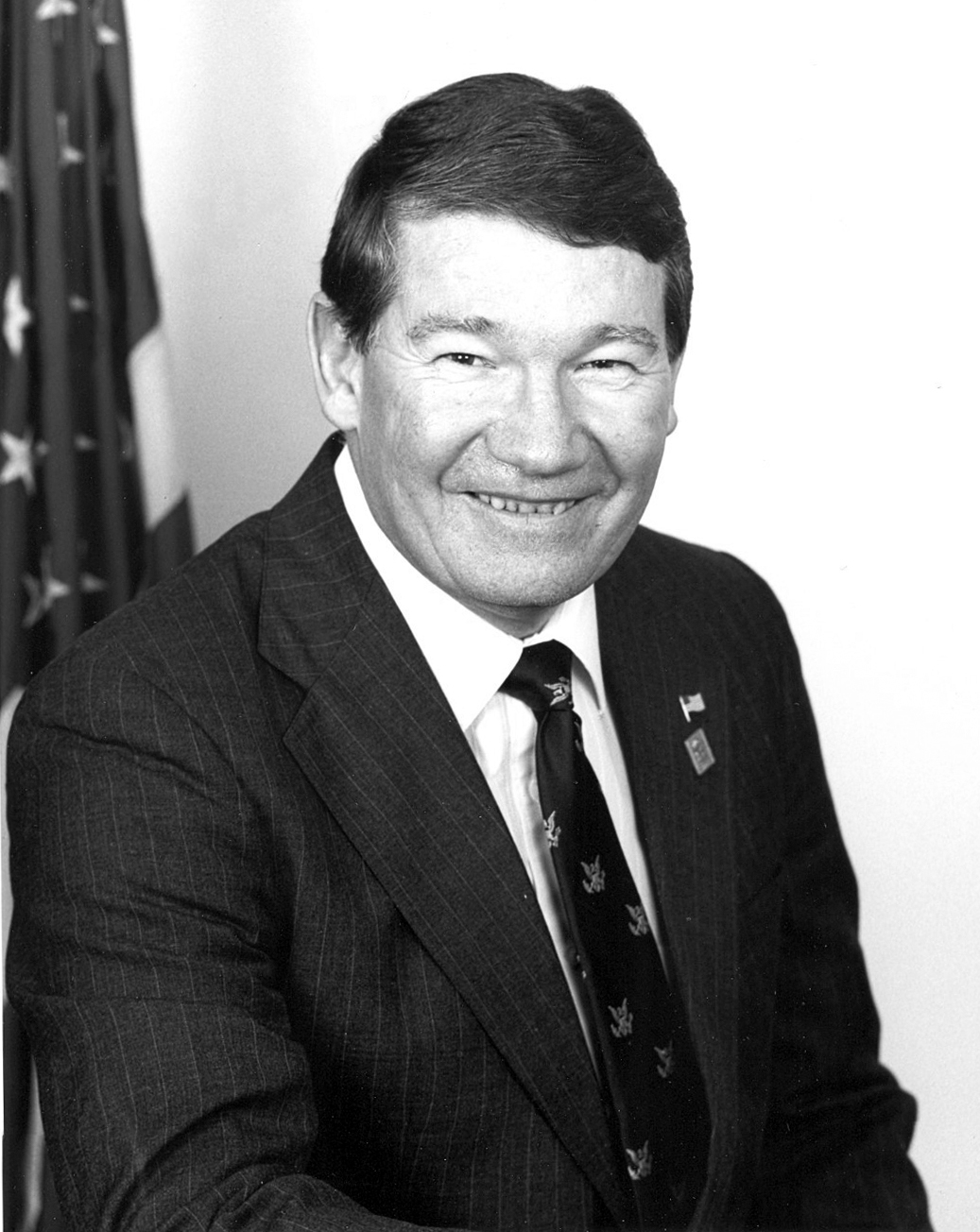

Nominee	Duke Cunningham	George "Jorge" Barraza
Party	Republican	Democratic
Popular vote	172,291	81,408
Percentage	64.3%	30.4%
- County results Cunningham: 60–70%
U.S. Representative before election
Duke Cunningham
Republican
Elected U.S. Representative
Duke Cunningham
Republican

California's 51st congressional district election, 2000
Party	Candidate	Votes	%
Republican	Duke Cunningham (incumbent)	172,291	64.34
Democratic	George "Jorge" Barraza	81,408	30.40
Libertarian	Daniel L. Muhe	7,159	2.67
Natural Law	Eric Hunter Bourdette	6,941	2.59
Invalid or blank votes		21,627	7.47
Total votes		289,426	100.00
Turnout			
Republican hold			

== District 52 ==
2000 California's 52nd congressional district election
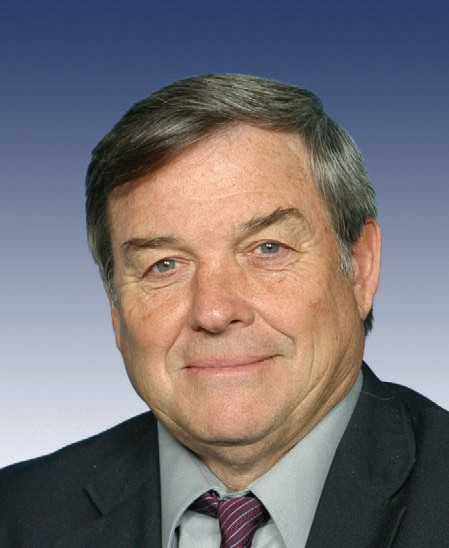

Nominee	Duncan Hunter	Craig Barkacs
Party	Republican	Democratic
Popular vote	131,345	63,537
Percentage	64.7%	31.3%
- County results Hunter: 50–60% 60–70%
U.S. Representative before election
Duncan Hunter
Republican
Elected U.S. Representative
Duncan Hunter
Republican

California's 52nd congressional district election, 2000
Party	Candidate	Votes	%
Republican	Duncan Hunter (incumbent)	131,345	64.70
Democratic	Craig Barkacs	63,537	31.30
Libertarian	Michael Benoit	5,995	2.95
Natural Law	Robert A. Sherman	2,117	1.04
Invalid or blank votes		13,362	6.18
Total votes		216,356	100.00
Turnout			
Republican hold			

== See also ==
- 107th United States Congress
- Political party strength in California
- Political party strength in U.S. states
- 2000 United States House of Representatives elections
