= California's congressional delegations =

Since California became a U.S. state in 1850, it has sent congressional delegations to the United States Senate and United States House of Representatives. Each state elects two senators to serve for six years, and members of the House to two-year terms.

These are tables of congressional delegations from California to the United States Senate and the United States House of Representatives.

Beginning in the 118th Congress, California sends 52 individuals to the United States House of Representatives, down from the previous 53 due to reapportionment following the 2020 census. This is the first time the number of Representatives from California has declined in American history.

== Current delegation ==
Current U.S. senators from California
California CPVI (2025): D+12	Class I senator	Class III senator
California CPVI (2025): D+12	Adam Schiff (Junior senator) (Burbank)	Alex Padilla (Senior senator) (Los Angeles)
Party	Democratic	Democratic
Incumbent since	December 8, 2024	January 18, 2021

California's current congressional delegation in the 119th Congress consists of its two senators, both of whom are Democrats, and its 52 representatives: 43 Democrats, 8 Republicans, and 1 independent.

The current dean of the California delegation is former Speaker of the House Nancy Pelosi of the 11th district, having served in the House since 1987.

Current U.S. representatives from California
District	Member (Residence)	Party	Incumbent since	CPVI (2026)	District map
1st	James Gallagher (East Nicolaus)	Republican	June 2, 2026	D+7	
2nd	Jared Huffman (San Rafael)	Democratic	January 3, 2013	D+13	
3rd	Kevin Kiley (Roseville)	Independent	January 3, 2023	D+6	
4th	Mike Thompson (St. Helena)	Democratic	January 3, 1999	D+8	
5th	Tom McClintock (Elk Grove)	Republican	January 3, 2009	R+10	
6th	Ami Bera (Elk Grove)	Democratic	January 3, 2013	D+5	
7th	Doris Matsui (Sacramento)	Democratic	March 10, 2005	D+7	
8th	John Garamendi (Walnut Grove)	Democratic	November 5, 2009	D+19	
9th	Josh Harder (Tracy)	Democratic	January 3, 2019	D+8	
10th	Mark DeSaulnier (Concord)	Democratic	January 3, 2015	D+18	
11th	Nancy Pelosi (San Francisco)	Democratic	June 2, 1987	D+36	
12th	Lateefah Simon (Emeryville)	Democratic	January 3, 2025	D+39	
13th	Adam Gray (Merced)	Democratic	January 3, 2025	D+2	
14th	Aisha Wahab (Hayward)	Democratic	August 18, 2026	D+19	
15th	Kevin Mullin (South San Francisco)	Democratic	January 3, 2023	D+26	
16th	Sam Liccardo (San Jose)	Democratic	January 3, 2025	D+25	
17th	Ro Khanna (Fremont)	Democratic	January 3, 2017	D+21	
18th	Zoe Lofgren (San Jose)	Democratic	January 3, 1995	D+16	
19th	Jimmy Panetta (Carmel Valley)	Democratic	January 3, 2017	D+18	
20th	Vince Fong (Bakersfield)	Republican	May 21, 2024	R+16	
21st	Jim Costa (Fresno)	Democratic	January 3, 2005	D+5	
22nd	David Valadao (Hanford)	Republican	January 3, 2021	D+1	
23rd	Jay Obernolte (Big Bear Lake)	Republican	January 3, 2021	R+9	
24th	Salud Carbajal (Santa Barbara)	Democratic	January 3, 2017	D+13	
25th	Raul Ruiz (Indio)	Democratic	January 3, 2013	D+4	
26th	Julia Brownley (Westlake Village)	Democratic	January 3, 2013	D+9	
27th	George T. Whitesides (Agua Dulce)	Democratic	January 3, 2025	D+6	
28th	Judy Chu (Monterey Park)	Democratic	July 14, 2009	D+14	
29th	Luz Rivas (Los Angeles)	Democratic	January 3, 2025	D+19	
30th	Laura Friedman (Glendale)	Democratic	January 3, 2025	D+21	
31st	Gil Cisneros (Covina)	Democratic	January 3, 2025	D+8	
32nd	Brad Sherman (Los Angeles)	Democratic	January 3, 1997	D+14	
33rd	Pete Aguilar (Redlands)	Democratic	January 3, 2015	D+7	
34th	Jimmy Gomez (Los Angeles)	Democratic	July 11, 2017	D+28	
35th	Norma Torres (Pomona)	Democratic	January 3, 2015	D+6	
36th	Ted Lieu (Torrance)	Democratic	January 3, 2015	D+21	
37th	Sydney Kamlager-Dove (Los Angeles)	Democratic	January 3, 2023	D+33	
38th	Linda Sánchez (Whittier)	Democratic	January 3, 2003	D+8	
39th	Mark Takano (Riverside)	Democratic	January 3, 2013	D+7	
40th	Young Kim (Anaheim Hills)	Republican	January 3, 2021	R+6	
41st	Ken Calvert (Corona)	Republican	January 3, 1993	D+9	
42nd	Robert Garcia (Long Beach)	Democratic	January 3, 2023	D+8	
43rd	Maxine Waters (Los Angeles)	Democratic	January 3, 1991	D+27	
44th	Nanette Barragán (Los Angeles)	Democratic	January 3, 2017	D+20	
45th	Derek Tran (Orange)	Democratic	January 3, 2025	D+3	
46th	Lou Correa (Santa Ana)	Democratic	January 3, 2017	D+10	
47th	Dave Min (Irvine)	Democratic	January 3, 2025	D+6	
48th	Darrell Issa (Bonsall)	Republican	January 3, 2021	D+2	
49th	Mike Levin (San Juan Capistrano)	Democratic	January 3, 2019	D+7	
50th	Scott Peters (San Diego)	Democratic	January 3, 2013	D+10	
51st	Sara Jacobs (San Diego)	Democratic	January 3, 2021	D+10	
52nd	Juan Vargas (San Diego)	Democratic	January 3, 2013	D+11	

== United States Senate ==
Class I senator	Congress	Class III senator
John C. Frémont (D)	31st (1849–1851)	William M. Gwin (D)
John B. Weller (D)	32nd (1851–1853)	William M. Gwin (D)
John B. Weller (D)	33rd (1853–1855)	William M. Gwin (D)
John B. Weller (D)	34th (1855–1857)	vacant
John B. Weller (D)	34th (1855–1857)	William M. Gwin (D)
David C. Broderick (D)	35th (1857–1859)	William M. Gwin (D)
Henry P. Haun (D)	35th (1857–1859)	William M. Gwin (D)
Milton Latham (D)	35th (1857–1859)	William M. Gwin (D)
Milton Latham (D)	36th (1859–1861)	William M. Gwin (D)
Milton Latham (D)	37th (1861–1863)	James A. McDougall (D)
John Conness (R)	38th (1863–1865)	James A. McDougall (D)
John Conness (R)	39th (1865–1867)	James A. McDougall (D)
John Conness (R)	40th (1867–1869)	Cornelius Cole (R)
Eugene Casserly (D)	41st (1869–1871)	Cornelius Cole (R)
Eugene Casserly (D)	42nd (1871–1873)	Cornelius Cole (R)
Eugene Casserly (D)	43rd (1873–1875)	Aaron A. Sargent (R)
John S. Hager (D)	43rd (1873–1875)	Aaron A. Sargent (R)
Newton Booth (A-Mo)	44th (1875–1877)	Aaron A. Sargent (R)
Newton Booth (A-Mo)	45th (1877–1879)	Aaron A. Sargent (R)
Newton Booth (A-Mo)	46th (1879–1881)	James T. Farley (D)
John Franklin Miller (R)	47th (1881–1883)	James T. Farley (D)
John Franklin Miller (R)	48th (1883–1885)	James T. Farley (D)
John Franklin Miller (R)	49th (1885–1887)	Leland Stanford (R)
George Hearst (D)	49th (1885–1887)	Leland Stanford (R)
Abram Williams (R)	49th (1885–1887)	Leland Stanford (R)
George Hearst (D)	50th (1887–1889)	Leland Stanford (R)
George Hearst (D)	51st (1889–1891)	Leland Stanford (R)
Charles N. Felton (R)	52nd (1891–1893)	Leland Stanford (R)
Stephen M. White (D)	53rd (1893–1895)	Leland Stanford (R)
Stephen M. White (D)	53rd (1893–1895)	George C. Perkins (R)
Stephen M. White (D)	54th (1895–1897)	George C. Perkins (R)
Stephen M. White (D)	55th (1897–1899)	George C. Perkins (R)
Thomas R. Bard (R)	56th (1899–1901)	George C. Perkins (R)
Thomas R. Bard (R)	57th (1901–1903)	George C. Perkins (R)
Thomas R. Bard (R)	58th (1903–1905)	George C. Perkins (R)
Frank Flint (R)	59th (1905–1907)	George C. Perkins (R)
Frank Flint (R)	60th (1907–1909)	George C. Perkins (R)
Frank Flint (R)	61st (1909–1911)	George C. Perkins (R)
John D. Works (R)	62nd (1911–1913)	George C. Perkins (R)
John D. Works (R)	63rd (1913–1915)	George C. Perkins (R)
John D. Works (R)	64th (1915–1917)	James D. Phelan (D)
Hiram Johnson (R)	65th (1917–1919)	James D. Phelan (D)
Hiram Johnson (R)	66th (1919–1921)	James D. Phelan (D)
Hiram Johnson (R)	67th (1921–1923)	Samuel M. Shortridge (R)
Hiram Johnson (R)	68th (1923–1925)	Samuel M. Shortridge (R)
Hiram Johnson (R)	69th (1925–1927)	Samuel M. Shortridge (R)
Hiram Johnson (R)	70th (1927–1929)	Samuel M. Shortridge (R)
Hiram Johnson (R)	71st (1929–1931)	Samuel M. Shortridge (R)
Hiram Johnson (R)	72nd (1931–1933)	Samuel M. Shortridge (R)
Hiram Johnson (R)	73rd (1933–1935)	William Gibbs; McAdoo (D)
Hiram Johnson (R)	74th (1935–1937)	William Gibbs; McAdoo (D)
Hiram Johnson (R)	75th (1937–1939)	William Gibbs; McAdoo (D)
Hiram Johnson (R)	75th (1937–1939)	Thomas M. Storke (D)
Hiram Johnson (R)	76th (1939–1941)	Sheridan Downey (D)
Hiram Johnson (R)	77th (1941–1943)	Sheridan Downey (D)
Hiram Johnson (R)	78th (1943–1945)	Sheridan Downey (D)
Hiram Johnson (R)	79th (1945–1947)	Sheridan Downey (D)
William Knowland (R)	79th (1945–1947)	Sheridan Downey (D)
William Knowland (R)	80th (1947–1949)	Sheridan Downey (D)
William Knowland (R)	81st (1949–1951)	Sheridan Downey (D)
William Knowland (R)	81st (1949–1951)	Richard Nixon (R)
William Knowland (R)	82nd (1951–1953)	Richard Nixon (R)
William Knowland (R)	82nd (1951–1953)	Thomas Kuchel (R)
William Knowland (R)	83rd (1953–1955)	Thomas Kuchel (R)
William Knowland (R)	84th (1955–1957)	Thomas Kuchel (R)
William Knowland (R)	85th (1957–1959)	Thomas Kuchel (R)
Clair Engle (D)	86th (1959–1961)	Thomas Kuchel (R)
Clair Engle (D)	87th (1961–1963)	Thomas Kuchel (R)
Clair Engle (D)	88th (1963–1965)	Thomas Kuchel (R)
Pierre Salinger (D)	88th (1963–1965)	Thomas Kuchel (R)
George Murphy (R)	88th (1963–1965)	Thomas Kuchel (R)
George Murphy (R)	89th (1965–1967)	Thomas Kuchel (R)
George Murphy (R)	90th (1967–1969)	Thomas Kuchel (R)
George Murphy (R)	91st (1969–1971)	Alan Cranston (D)
John V. Tunney (D)	91st (1969–1971)	Alan Cranston (D)
John V. Tunney (D)	92nd (1971–1973)	Alan Cranston (D)
John V. Tunney (D)	93rd (1973–1975)	Alan Cranston (D)
John V. Tunney (D)	94th (1975–1977)	Alan Cranston (D)
S. I. Hayakawa (R)	95th (1977–1979)	Alan Cranston (D)
S. I. Hayakawa (R)	96th (1979–1981)	Alan Cranston (D)
S. I. Hayakawa (R)	97th (1981–1983)	Alan Cranston (D)
Pete Wilson (R)	98th (1983–1985)	Alan Cranston (D)
Pete Wilson (R)	99th (1985–1987)	Alan Cranston (D)
Pete Wilson (R)	100th (1987–1989)	Alan Cranston (D)
Pete Wilson (R)	101st (1989–1991)	Alan Cranston (D)
Pete Wilson (R)	102nd (1991–1993)	Alan Cranston (D)
John Seymour (R)	102nd (1991–1993)	Alan Cranston (D)
Dianne Feinstein (D)	102nd (1991–1993)	Alan Cranston (D)
Dianne Feinstein (D)	103rd (1993–1995)	Barbara Boxer (D)
Dianne Feinstein (D)	104th (1995–1997)	Barbara Boxer (D)
Dianne Feinstein (D)	105th (1997–1999)	Barbara Boxer (D)
Dianne Feinstein (D)	106th (1999–2001)	Barbara Boxer (D)
Dianne Feinstein (D)	107th (2001–2003)	Barbara Boxer (D)
Dianne Feinstein (D)	108th (2003–2005)	Barbara Boxer (D)
Dianne Feinstein (D)	109th (2005–2007)	Barbara Boxer (D)
Dianne Feinstein (D)	110th (2007–2009)	Barbara Boxer (D)
Dianne Feinstein (D)	111th (2009–2011)	Barbara Boxer (D)
Dianne Feinstein (D)	112th (2011–2013)	Barbara Boxer (D)
Dianne Feinstein (D)	113th (2013–2015)	Barbara Boxer (D)
Dianne Feinstein (D)	114th (2015–2017)	Barbara Boxer (D)
Dianne Feinstein (D)	115th (2017–2019)	Kamala Harris (D)
Dianne Feinstein (D)	116th (2019–2021)	Kamala Harris (D)
Dianne Feinstein (D)	117th (2021–2023)	Kamala Harris (D)
Dianne Feinstein (D)	117th (2021–2023)	Alex Padilla (D)
Dianne Feinstein (D)	118th (2023–2025)	Alex Padilla (D)
Laphonza Butler (D)	118th (2023–2025)	Alex Padilla (D)
Adam Schiff (D)	118th (2023–2025)	Alex Padilla (D)
Adam Schiff (D)	119th (2025–2027)	Alex Padilla (D)
Adam Schiff (D)	120th (2027–2029)	Alex Padilla (D)

=== Mid-term changes ===
Congress	Senator	Reason for Vacancy	Appointed Successor	Date of Appointment	Elected Successor	Date of Election
32nd	Seat was vacant from March 4, 1851, due to failure of the legislature to elect.				John B. Weller	January 30, 1852
34th	Seat was vacant from March 4, 1855, due to failure of the legislature to elect.				William M. Gwin	January 13, 1857
35th	David C. Broderick	Died September 16, 1859.	Henry P. Haun	November 3, 1859	Milton Latham	March 5, 1860
43rd	Eugene Casserly	Resigned November 29, 1873.	none		John S. Hager	December 23, 1873
49th	John Franklin Miller	Died March 8, 1886.	George Hearst	March 23, 1886	Abram Williams	August 4, 1886
51st, 52nd	George Hearst	Died February 28, 1891.	none		Charles N. Felton	March 19, 1891
53rd	Leland Stanford	Died June 21, 1893.	George C. Perkins	July 26, 1893	George C. Perkins	
56th	Seat was vacant from March 4, 1899, due to failure of the legislature to elect.				Thomas R. Bard	February 7, 1900
75th	William Gibbs McAdoo	Resigned November 8, 1938.	Thomas M. Storke	November 9, 1938	none	
79th	Hiram Johnson	Died August 6, 1945.	William Knowland	August 26, 1945	William F. Knowland	General election
81st	Sheridan Downey	Resigned November 30, 1950, due to ill health.	Richard Nixon	December 1, 1950	Richard Nixon	General election
82nd	Richard Nixon	Resigned January 1, 1953, to become U.S. vice president.	Thomas Kuchel	January 2, 1953	Thomas H. Kuchel	General election
88th	Clair Engle	Died July 30, 1964.	Pierre Salinger	August 4, 1964	none	
88th	Pierre Salinger	Resigned December 31, 1964.	George Murphy	January 1, 1965	George Lloyd Murphy	General election
91st	George Murphy	Resigned January 2, 1971. Successor had been elected to the next term and took office a day early.	John V. Tunney	January 2, 1971	John V. Tunney	General election
94th	John V. Tunney	Resigned January 1, 1977. Successor had been elected to the next term and took office a day early.	S. I. Hayakawa	January 2, 1977	S.I. Hayakawa	General election
102nd	Pete Wilson	Resigned January 7, 1991, to become governor of California.	John Seymour	January 10, 1991	Dianne Feinstein	November 10, 1992
117th	Kamala Harris	Resigned January 18, 2021, to become U.S. vice president	Alex Padilla	January 18, 2021	Alex Padilla	General and special election
118th	Dianne Feinstein	Died September 29, 2023.	Laphonza Butler	October 1, 2023	Adam Schiff	General and special election

== United States House of Representatives ==
=== 1850–1861: 2 seats ===
Following statehood on September 9, 1850, California had two seats in the House.

Congress	2 seats elected on a general ticket	
Congress	1st seat	2nd seat
31st (1849–1851)	George W. Wright (I)	Edward Gilbert (D)
32nd (1851–1853)	Edward C. Marshall (D)	Joseph W. McCorkle (D)
33rd (1853–1855)	Milton Latham (D)	James A. McDougall (D)
34th (1855–1857)	James W. Denver (D)	Philemon T. Herbert (D)
35th (1857–1859)	Joseph C. McKibbin (D)	Charles L. Scott (D)
36th (1859–1861)	John Chilton Burch (D)	Charles L. Scott (D)

=== 1861–1873: 3 seats ===
Following passage of 12 Stat. 411, California was apportioned three seats. It retained the third seat following the 1860 census. For four years, the seats were elected at-large statewide on a general ticket. Since 1865, districts were used.

Congress	3 seats elected on a general ticket		
Congress	1st seat	2nd seat	3rd seat
37th (1861–1863)	Timothy Guy Phelps (R)	Aaron A. Sargent (R)	Frederick Low (R)
38th (1863–1865)	Cornelius Cole (R)	William Higby (R)	Thomas B. Shannon (R)
Congress	1st district	2nd district	3rd district
39th (1865–1867)	Donald C. McRuer (R)	William Higby (R)	John Bidwell (R)
40th (1867–1869)	Samuel Beach Axtell (D)	William Higby (R)	James A. Johnson (D)
41st (1869–1871)	Samuel Beach Axtell (D)	Aaron A. Sargent (R)	James A. Johnson (D)
42nd (1871–1873)	Sherman O. Houghton (R)	Aaron A. Sargent (R)	John M. Coghlan (R)

=== 1873–1883: 4 seats ===
Following the 1870 census, California was apportioned four seats.

Congress	1st district	2nd district	3rd district	4th district
43rd (1873–1875)	Charles Clayton (R)	Horace F. Page (R)	John K. Luttrell (D)	Sherman O. Houghton (R)
44th (1875–1877)	William A. Piper (D)	Horace F. Page (R)	John K. Luttrell (D)	Peter D. Wigginton (D)
45th (1877–1879)	Horace Davis (R)	Horace F. Page (R)	John K. Luttrell (D)	Romualdo Pacheco (R)
45th (1877–1879)	Horace Davis (R)	Horace F. Page (R)	John K. Luttrell (D)	Peter D. Wigginton (D)
46th (1879–1881)	Horace Davis (R)	Horace F. Page (R)	Campbell P. Berry (D)	Romualdo Pacheco (R)
47th (1881–1883)	William Rosecrans (D)	Horace F. Page (R)	Campbell P. Berry (D)	Romualdo Pacheco (R)

=== 1883–1893: 6 seats ===
Following the 1880 census, California was apportioned six seats. From 1883 to 1887, the two new seats were elected at-large, statewide. Since 1887, the entire delegation was redistricted.

Congress	Districts				At-large seats	
Congress	1st	2nd	3rd	4th	1st seat	2nd seat
48th (1883–1885)	William Rosecrans (D)	James Budd (D)	Barclay Henley (D)	Pleasant B. Tully (D)	John R. Glascock (D)	Charles A. Sumner (D)
49th (1885–1887)	Barclay Henley (D)	James A. Louttit (R)	Joseph McKenna (R)	William W. Morrow (R)	5th district	6th district
49th (1885–1887)	Barclay Henley (D)	James A. Louttit (R)	Joseph McKenna (R)	William W. Morrow (R)	Charles N. Felton (R)	Henry Markham (R)
50th (1887–1889)	Thomas L. Thompson (D)	Marion Biggs (D)	Joseph McKenna (R)	William W. Morrow (R)	Charles N. Felton (R)	William Vandever (R)
51st (1889–1891)	John J. De Haven (R)	Marion Biggs (D)	Joseph McKenna (R)	William W. Morrow (R)	Thomas J. Clunie (D)	William Vandever (R)
51st (1889–1891)	Thomas J. Geary (D)	Marion Biggs (D)	Joseph McKenna (R)	William W. Morrow (R)	Thomas J. Clunie (D)	William Vandever (R)
52nd (1891–1893)	Thomas J. Geary (D)	Anthony Caminetti (D)	Joseph McKenna (R)	John T. Cutting (R)	Eugene F. Loud (R)	William W. Bowers (R)
52nd (1891–1893)	Thomas J. Geary (D)	Anthony Caminetti (D)	Samuel G. Hilborn (R)	John T. Cutting (R)	Eugene F. Loud (R)	William W. Bowers (R)

=== 1893–1903: 7 seats ===
Following the 1890 census, California was apportioned seven seats.

Congress	Districts						
Congress	1st	2nd	3rd	4th	5th	6th	7th
53rd (1893–1895)	Thomas J. Geary (D)	Anthony; Caminetti (D)	Samuel G. Hilborn (R)	James G. Maguire (D)	Eugene F. Loud (R)	Marion Cannon (Pop)	William W. Bowers (R)
53rd (1893–1895)	Thomas J. Geary (D)	Anthony; Caminetti (D)	Warren B. English (D)	James G. Maguire (D)	Eugene F. Loud (R)	Marion Cannon (Pop)	William W. Bowers (R)
54th (1895–1897)	John A. Barnham (R)	Grove Johnson (R)	Samuel G. Hilborn (R)	James G. Maguire (D)	Eugene F. Loud (R)	James McLachlan (R)	William W. Bowers (R)
55th (1897–1899)	John A. Barnham (R)	Marion; De Vries (D)	Samuel G. Hilborn (R)	James G. Maguire (D)	Eugene F. Loud (R)	Charles A. Barlow (Pop)	Curtis H. Castle (Pop)
56th (1899–1901)	John A. Barnham (R)	Marion; De Vries (D)	Victor H. Metcalf (R)	Julius; Kahn (R)	Eugene F. Loud (R)	Russell J. Waters (R)	James C. Needham (R)
56th (1899–1901)	John A. Barnham (R)	Samuel D. Woods (R)	Victor H. Metcalf (R)	Julius; Kahn (R)	Eugene F. Loud (R)	Russell J. Waters (R)	James C. Needham (R)
57th (1901–1903)	Frank Coombs (R)	Samuel D. Woods (R)	Victor H. Metcalf (R)	Julius; Kahn (R)	Eugene F. Loud (R)	James McLachlan (R)	James C. Needham (R)

=== 1903–1913: 8 seats ===
Following the 1900 census, California was apportioned eight seats.

Congress	Districts							
Congress	1st	2nd	3rd	4th	5th	6th	7th	8th
58th (1903–1905)	James Gillett (R)	Theodore Bell (D)	Victor H. Metcalf (R)	Edward J. Livernash (D/UL)	William J. Wynn (D)	James C. Needham (R)	James; McLachlan (R)	Milton J. Daniels (R)
58th (1903–1905)	James Gillett (R)	Theodore Bell (D)	Joseph R. Knowland (R)	Edward J. Livernash (D/UL)	William J. Wynn (D)	James C. Needham (R)	James; McLachlan (R)	Milton J. Daniels (R)
59th (1905–1907)	James Gillett (R)	Duncan E. McKinlay (R)	Joseph R. Knowland (R)	Julius Kahn (R)	Everis A. Hayes (R)	James C. Needham (R)	James; McLachlan (R)	Sylvester C. Smith (R)
59th (1905–1907)	William F. Englebright (R)	Duncan E. McKinlay (R)	Joseph R. Knowland (R)	Julius Kahn (R)	Everis A. Hayes (R)	James C. Needham (R)	James; McLachlan (R)	Sylvester C. Smith (R)
60th (1907–1909)	William F. Englebright (R)	Duncan E. McKinlay (R)	Joseph R. Knowland (R)	Julius Kahn (R)	Everis A. Hayes (R)	James C. Needham (R)	James; McLachlan (R)	Sylvester C. Smith (R)
61st (1909–1911)	William F. Englebright (R)	Duncan E. McKinlay (R)	Joseph R. Knowland (R)	Julius Kahn (R)	Everis A. Hayes (R)	James C. Needham (R)	James; McLachlan (R)	Sylvester C. Smith (R)
62nd (1911–1913)	John E. Raker (D)	William Kent (R)	Joseph R. Knowland (R)	Julius Kahn (R)	Everis A. Hayes (R)	James C. Needham (R)	William Stephens (R)	Sylvester C. Smith (R)

=== 1913–1933: 11 seats ===
Following the 1910 census, California was apportioned 11 seats.

Congress	Districts										
Congress	1st	2nd	3rd	4th	5th	6th	7th	8th	9th	10th	11th
63rd (1913–1915)	William; Kent (I)	John E. Raker (D)	Charles F. Curry (R)	Julius Kahn (R)	John I. Nolan (R)	Joseph R. Knowland (R)	Denver S. Church (D)	Everis A. Hayes (R)	Charles W. Bell (Prog)	William Stephens (R)	William; Kettner (D)
64th (1915–1917)	William; Kent (I)	John E. Raker (D)	Charles F. Curry (R)	Julius Kahn (R)	John I. Nolan (R)	John A. Elston (Prog)	Denver S. Church (D)	Everis A. Hayes (R)	Charles; Randall (Proh)	William Stephens (Prog)	William; Kettner (D)
64th (1915–1917)	William; Kent (I)	John E. Raker (D)	Charles F. Curry (R)	Julius Kahn (R)	John I. Nolan (R)	John A. Elston (Prog)	Denver S. Church (D)	Everis A. Hayes (R)	Charles; Randall (Proh)	Henry S. Benedict (R)	William; Kettner (D)
65th (1917–1919)	Clarence F. Lea (D)	John E. Raker (D)	Charles F. Curry (R)	Julius Kahn (R)	John I. Nolan (R)	John A. Elston (Prog)	Denver S. Church (D)	Everis A. Hayes (R)	Charles; Randall (Proh)	Henry Z. Osborne (R)	William; Kettner (D)
66th (1919–1921)	Clarence F. Lea (D)	John E. Raker (D)	Charles F. Curry (R)	Julius Kahn (R)	John I. Nolan (R)	John A. Elston (Prog)	Henry E. Barbour (R)	Hugh S. Hersman (D)	Charles; Randall (Proh)	Henry Z. Osborne (R)	William; Kettner (D)
67th (1921–1923)	Clarence F. Lea (D)	John E. Raker (D)	Charles F. Curry (R)	Julius Kahn (R)	John I. Nolan (R)	John A. Elston (Prog)	Henry E. Barbour (R)	Arthur M. Free (R)	Walter F. Lineberger (R)	Henry Z. Osborne (R)	Phil Swing (R)
67th (1921–1923)	Clarence F. Lea (D)	John E. Raker (D)	Charles F. Curry (R)	Julius Kahn (R)	Mae Nolan (R)	James H. MacLafferty (R)	Henry E. Barbour (R)	Arthur M. Free (R)	Walter F. Lineberger (R)	Henry Z. Osborne (R)	Phil Swing (R)
68th (1923–1925)	Clarence F. Lea (D)	John E. Raker (D)	Charles F. Curry (R)	Julius Kahn (R)	Mae Nolan (R)	James H. MacLafferty (R)	Henry E. Barbour (R)	Arthur M. Free (R)	Walter F. Lineberger (R)	Henry Z. Osborne (R)	Phil Swing (R)
68th (1923–1925)	Clarence F. Lea (D)	John E. Raker (D)	Charles F. Curry (R)	Julius Kahn (R)	Mae Nolan (R)	James H. MacLafferty (R)	Henry E. Barbour (R)	Arthur M. Free (R)	Walter F. Lineberger (R)	John D. Fredericks (R)	Phil Swing (R)
69th (1925–1927)	Clarence F. Lea (D)	John E. Raker (D)	Charles F. Curry (R)	Florence Prag; Kahn (R)	Lawrence Flaherty (R)	Albert E. Carter (R)	Henry E. Barbour (R)	Arthur M. Free (R)	Walter F. Lineberger (R)	John D. Fredericks (R)	Phil Swing (R)
69th (1925–1927)	Clarence F. Lea (D)	Harry L. Englebright (R)	Charles F. Curry (R)	Florence Prag; Kahn (R)	Richard J. Welch (R)	Albert E. Carter (R)	Henry E. Barbour (R)	Arthur M. Free (R)	Walter F. Lineberger (R)	John D. Fredericks (R)	Phil Swing (R)
70th (1927–1929)	Clarence F. Lea (D)	Harry L. Englebright (R)	Charles F. Curry (R)	Florence Prag; Kahn (R)	Richard J. Welch (R)	Albert E. Carter (R)	Henry E. Barbour (R)	Arthur M. Free (R)	William E. Evans (R)	Joe Crail (R)	Phil Swing (R)
71st (1929–1931)	Clarence F. Lea (D)	Harry L. Englebright (R)	Charles F. Curry (R)	Florence Prag; Kahn (R)	Richard J. Welch (R)	Albert E. Carter (R)	Henry E. Barbour (R)	Arthur M. Free (R)	William E. Evans (R)	Joe Crail (R)	Phil Swing (R)
72nd (1931–1933)	Clarence F. Lea (D)	Harry L. Englebright (R)	Charles F. Curry Jr. (R)	Florence Prag; Kahn (R)	Richard J. Welch (R)	Albert E. Carter (R)	Henry E. Barbour (R)	Arthur M. Free (R)	William E. Evans (R)	Joe Crail (R)	Phil Swing (R)
Congress	1st	2nd	3rd	4th	5th	6th	7th	8th	9th	10th	11th
Congress	Districts										

=== 1933–1943: 20 seats ===
Following the 1930 census, California was apportioned 20 seats.

Congress	Districts																			
Congress	1st	2nd	3rd	4th	5th	6th	7th	8th	9th	10th	11th	12th	13th	14th	15th	16th	17th	18th	19th	20th
73rd (1933–1935)	Clarence; F. Lea (D)	Harry L. Englebright (R)	Frank; H. Buck (D)	Florence; Prag; Kahn (R)	Richard; J. Welch (R)	Albert; E. Carter (R)	Ralph R. Eltse (R)	John J. McGrath (D)	Denver S. Church (D)	Henry E. Stubbs (D)	William E. Evans (R)	John H. Hoeppel (D)	Charles; Kramer (D)	Thomas; F. Ford (D)	William I. Traeger (R)	John F. Dockweiler (D)	Charles J. Colden (D)	John H. Burke (D)	Sam L. Collins (R)	George; Burnham (R)
74th (1935–1937)	Clarence; F. Lea (D)	Harry L. Englebright (R)	Frank; H. Buck (D)	Florence; Prag; Kahn (R)	Richard; J. Welch (R)	Albert; E. Carter (R)	John H. Tolan (D)	John J. McGrath (D)	Bud; Gearhart (R)	Henry E. Stubbs (D)	John S. McGroarty (D)	John H. Hoeppel (D)	Charles; Kramer (D)	Thomas; F. Ford (D)	John M. Costello (D)	John F. Dockweiler (D)	Charles J. Colden (D)	Byron N. Scott (D)	Sam L. Collins (R)	George; Burnham (R)
75th (1937–1939)	Clarence; F. Lea (D)	Harry L. Englebright (R)	Frank; H. Buck (D)	Franck R. Havenner (Prog)	Richard; J. Welch (R)	Albert; E. Carter (R)	John H. Tolan (D)	John J. McGrath (D)	Bud; Gearhart (R)	Henry E. Stubbs (D)	John S. McGroarty (D)	Jerry; Voorhis (D)	Charles; Kramer (D)	Thomas; F. Ford (D)	John M. Costello (D)	John F. Dockweiler (D)	Charles J. Colden (D)	Byron N. Scott (D)	Harry R. Sheppard (D)	Edouard; Izac (D)
75th (1937–1939)	Clarence; F. Lea (D)	Harry L. Englebright (R)	Frank; H. Buck (D)	Franck R. Havenner (Prog)	Richard; J. Welch (R)	Albert; E. Carter (R)	John H. Tolan (D)	John J. McGrath (D)	Bud; Gearhart (R)	Alfred J. Elliott (D)	John S. McGroarty (D)	Jerry; Voorhis (D)	Charles; Kramer (D)	Thomas; F. Ford (D)	John M. Costello (D)	John F. Dockweiler (D)	Charles J. Colden (D)	Byron N. Scott (D)	Harry R. Sheppard (D)	Edouard; Izac (D)
76th (1939–1941)	Clarence; F. Lea (D)	Harry L. Englebright (R)	Frank; H. Buck (D)	Franck R. Havenner (Prog)	Richard; J. Welch (R)	Albert; E. Carter (R)	John H. Tolan (D)	Jack Z. Anderson (R)	Bud; Gearhart (R)	Alfred J. Elliott (D)	Carl; Hinshaw (R)	Jerry; Voorhis (D)	Charles; Kramer (D)	Thomas; F. Ford (D)	John M. Costello (D)	Leland M. Ford (R)	Lee E. Geyer (D)	Thomas M. Eaton (R)	Harry R. Sheppard (D)	Edouard; Izac (D)
77th (1941–1943)	Clarence; F. Lea (D)	Harry L. Englebright (R)	Frank; H. Buck (D)	Thomas; Rolph (R)	Richard; J. Welch (R)	Albert; E. Carter (R)	John H. Tolan (D)	Jack Z. Anderson (R)	Bud; Gearhart (R)	Alfred J. Elliott (D)	Carl; Hinshaw (R)	Jerry; Voorhis (D)	Charles; Kramer (D)	Thomas; F. Ford (D)	John M. Costello (D)	Leland M. Ford (R)	Lee E. Geyer (D)	Ward; Johnson (R)	Harry R. Sheppard (D)	Edouard; Izac (D)
77th (1941–1943)	Clarence; F. Lea (D)	Harry L. Englebright (R)	Frank; H. Buck (D)	Thomas; Rolph (R)	Richard; J. Welch (R)	Albert; E. Carter (R)	John H. Tolan (D)	Jack Z. Anderson (R)	Bud; Gearhart (R)	Alfred J. Elliott (D)	Carl; Hinshaw (R)	Jerry; Voorhis (D)	Charles; Kramer (D)	Thomas; F. Ford (D)	John M. Costello (D)	Leland M. Ford (R)	Cecil R. King (D)	Ward; Johnson (R)	Harry R. Sheppard (D)	Edouard; Izac (D)

=== 1943–1953: 23 seats ===
Following the 1940 census, California was apportioned 23 seats.

Congress	Districts																						
Congress	1st	2nd	3rd	4th	5th	6th	7th	8th	9th	10th	11th	12th	13th	14th	15th	16th	17th	18th	19th	20th	21st	22nd	23rd
78th (1943–1945)	Clarence F. Lea (D)	Harry L. Englebright (R)	J. Leroy Johnson (R)	Thomas Rolph (R)	Richard J. Welch (R)	Albert E. Carter (R)	John H. Tolan (D)	Jack Z. Anderson (R)	Bud Gearhart (R)	Alfred J. Elliott (D)	George E. Outland (D)	Jerry Voorhis (D)	Norris Poulson (R)	Thomas F. Ford (D)	John M. Costello (D)	Will Rogers Jr. (D)	Cecil R. King (D)	Ward Johnson (R)	Chet Holifield (D)	Carl Hinshaw (R)	Harry R. Sheppard (D)	John R. Phillips (R)	Edouard Izac (D)
78th (1943–1945)	Clarence F. Lea (D)	Clair Engle (D)	J. Leroy Johnson (R)	Thomas Rolph (R)	Richard J. Welch (R)	Albert E. Carter (R)	John H. Tolan (D)	Jack Z. Anderson (R)	Bud Gearhart (R)	Alfred J. Elliott (D)	George E. Outland (D)	Jerry Voorhis (D)	Norris Poulson (R)	Thomas F. Ford (D)	John M. Costello (D)	Will Rogers Jr. (D)	Cecil R. King (D)	Ward Johnson (R)	Chet Holifield (D)	Carl Hinshaw (R)	Harry R. Sheppard (D)	John R. Phillips (R)	Edouard Izac (D)
79th (1945–1947)	Clarence F. Lea (D)	Clair Engle (D)	J. Leroy Johnson (R)	Franck R. Havenner (D)	Richard J. Welch (R)	George P. Miller (D)	John H. Tolan (D)	Jack Z. Anderson (R)	Bud Gearhart (R)	Alfred J. Elliott (D)	George E. Outland (D)	Jerry Voorhis (D)	Ned R. Healy (D)	Helen Gahagan Douglas (D)	Gordon L. McDonough (R)	Ellis E. Patterson (D)	Cecil R. King (D)	Clyde Doyle (D)	Chet Holifield (D)	Carl Hinshaw (R)	Harry R. Sheppard (D)	John R. Phillips (R)	Edouard Izac (D)
80th (1947–1949)	Clarence F. Lea (D)	Clair Engle (D)	J. Leroy Johnson (R)	Franck R. Havenner (D)	Richard J. Welch (R)	George P. Miller (D)	John J. Allen Jr. (R)	Jack Z. Anderson (R)	Bud Gearhart (R)	Alfred J. Elliott (D)	Ernest K. Bramblett (R)	Richard Nixon (R)	Norris Poulson (R)	Helen Gahagan Douglas (D)	Gordon L. McDonough (R)	Donald L. Jackson (R)	Cecil R. King (D)	Willis W. Bradley (R)	Chet Holifield (D)	Carl Hinshaw (R)	Harry R. Sheppard (D)	John R. Phillips (R)	Charles K. Fletcher (R)
81st (1949–1951)	Hubert B. Scudder (R)	Clair Engle (D)	J. Leroy Johnson (R)	Franck R. Havenner (D)	Richard J. Welch (R)	George P. Miller (D)	John J. Allen Jr. (R)	Jack Z. Anderson (R)	Cecil F. White (D)	Thomas H. Werdel (R)	Ernest K. Bramblett (R)	Richard Nixon (R)	Norris Poulson (R)	Helen Gahagan Douglas (D)	Gordon L. McDonough (R)	Donald L. Jackson (R)	Cecil R. King (D)	Clyde Doyle (D)	Chet Holifield (D)	Carl Hinshaw (R)	Harry R. Sheppard (D)	John R. Phillips (R)	Clinton D. McKinnon (D)
81st (1949–1951)	Hubert B. Scudder (R)	Clair Engle (D)	J. Leroy Johnson (R)	Franck R. Havenner (D)	John F. Shelley (D)	George P. Miller (D)	John J. Allen Jr. (R)	Jack Z. Anderson (R)	Cecil F. White (D)	Thomas H. Werdel (R)	Ernest K. Bramblett (R)	Richard Nixon (R)	Norris Poulson (R)	Helen Gahagan Douglas (D)	Gordon L. McDonough (R)	Donald L. Jackson (R)	Cecil R. King (D)	Clyde Doyle (D)	Chet Holifield (D)	Carl Hinshaw (R)	Harry R. Sheppard (D)	John R. Phillips (R)	Clinton D. McKinnon (D)
82nd (1951–1953)	Hubert B. Scudder (R)	Clair Engle (D)	J. Leroy Johnson (R)	Franck R. Havenner (D)	John F. Shelley (D)	George P. Miller (D)	John J. Allen Jr. (R)	Jack Z. Anderson (R)	Allan O. Hunter (R)	Thomas H. Werdel (R)	Ernest K. Bramblett (R)	Patrick J. Hillings (R)	Norris Poulson (R)	Sam Yorty (D)	Gordon L. McDonough (R)	Donald L. Jackson (R)	Cecil R. King (D)	Clyde Doyle (D)	Chet Holifield (D)	Carl Hinshaw (R)	Harry R. Sheppard (D)	John R. Phillips (R)	Clinton D. McKinnon (D)

=== 1953–1963: 30 seats ===
Following the 1950 census, California was apportioned 30 seats.

Congress
83rd
(1953–1955)
84th
(1955–1957)
85th
(1957–1959)
86th
(1959–1961)
87th
(1961–1963)

Districts																														Congress
1st	2nd	3rd	4th	5th	6th	7th	8th	9th	10th	11th	12th	13th	14th	15th	16th	17th	18th	19th	20th	21st	22nd	23rd	24th	25th	26th	27th	28th	29th	30th	Congress
Hubert; B. Scudder (R)	Clair; Engle (D)	John; E. Moss (D)	William; S. Mailliard (R)	John; F. Shelley (D)	Robert; Condon (D)	John J. Allen; Jr. (R)	George; P. Miller (D)	J. Arthur; Younger (R)	Charles; Gubser (R)	J. Leroy; Johnson (R)	Allan O. Hunter (R)	Ernest K. Bramblett (R)	Harlan; Hagen (D)	Gordon; L. McDonough (R)	Donald; L. Jackson (R)	Cecil; R. King (D)	Craig; Hosmer (R)	Chet; Holifield (D)	Carl; Hinshaw (R)	Edgar W. Hiestand (R)	Joseph; F. Holt (R)	Clyde; Doyle (D)	Norris; Poulson (R)	Patrick; J. Hillings (R)	Sam; Yorty (D)	Harry; R. Sheppard (D)	James; B. Utt (R)	John; R. Phillips (R)	Bob; Wilson (R)	83rd (1953–1955)
Hubert; B. Scudder (R)	Clair; Engle (D)	John; E. Moss (D)	William; S. Mailliard (R)	John; F. Shelley (D)	Robert; Condon (D)	John J. Allen; Jr. (R)	George; P. Miller (D)	J. Arthur; Younger (R)	Charles; Gubser (R)	J. Leroy; Johnson (R)	Allan O. Hunter (R)	Ernest K. Bramblett (R)	Harlan; Hagen (D)	Gordon; L. McDonough (R)	Donald; L. Jackson (R)	Cecil; R. King (D)	Craig; Hosmer (R)	Chet; Holifield (D)	Carl; Hinshaw (R)	Edgar W. Hiestand (R)	Joseph; F. Holt (R)	Clyde; Doyle (D)	Glenard; P. Lipscomb (R)	Patrick; J. Hillings (R)	Sam; Yorty (D)	Harry; R. Sheppard (D)	James; B. Utt (R)	John; R. Phillips (R)	Bob; Wilson (R)	83rd (1953–1955)
Hubert; B. Scudder (R)	Clair; Engle (D)	John; E. Moss (D)	William; S. Mailliard (R)	John; F. Shelley (D)	John F. Baldwin; Jr. (R)	John J. Allen; Jr. (R)	George; P. Miller (D)	J. Arthur; Younger (R)	Charles; Gubser (R)	J. Leroy; Johnson (R)	B. F. Sisk (D)	Charles; M. Teague (R)	Harlan; Hagen (D)	Gordon; L. McDonough (R)	Donald; L. Jackson (R)	Cecil; R. King (D)	Craig; Hosmer (R)	Chet; Holifield (D)	Carl; Hinshaw (R)	Edgar W. Hiestand (R)	Joseph; F. Holt (R)	Clyde; Doyle (D)	Glenard; P. Lipscomb (R)	Patrick; J. Hillings (R)	James; Roosevelt (D)	Harry; R. Sheppard (D)	James; B. Utt (R)	John; R. Phillips (R)	Bob; Wilson (R)	84th (1955–1957)
Hubert; B. Scudder (R)	Clair; Engle (D)	John; E. Moss (D)	William; S. Mailliard (R)	John; F. Shelley (D)	John F. Baldwin; Jr. (R)	John J. Allen; Jr. (R)	George; P. Miller (D)	J. Arthur; Younger (R)	Charles; Gubser (R)	John; J. McFall (D)	B. F. Sisk (D)	Charles; M. Teague (R)	Harlan; Hagen (D)	Gordon; L. McDonough (R)	Donald; L. Jackson (R)	Cecil; R. King (D)	Craig; Hosmer (R)	Chet; Holifield (D)	H. Allen; Smith (R)	Edgar W. Hiestand (R)	Joseph; F. Holt (R)	Clyde; Doyle (D)	Glenard; P. Lipscomb (R)	Patrick; J. Hillings (R)	James; Roosevelt (D)	Harry; R. Sheppard (D)	James; B. Utt (R)	Dalip; Singh; Saund (D)	Bob; Wilson (R)	85th (1957–1959)
Clem; Miller (D)	Bizz; Johnson (D)	John; E. Moss (D)	William; S. Mailliard (R)	John; F. Shelley (D)	John F. Baldwin; Jr. (R)	Jeffery; Cohelan (D)	George; P. Miller (D)	J. Arthur; Younger (R)	Charles; Gubser (R)	John; J. McFall (D)	B. F. Sisk (D)	Charles; M. Teague (R)	Harlan; Hagen (D)	Gordon; L. McDonough (R)	Donald; L. Jackson (R)	Cecil; R. King (D)	Craig; Hosmer (R)	Chet; Holifield (D)	H. Allen; Smith (R)	Edgar W. Hiestand (R)	Joseph; F. Holt (R)	Clyde; Doyle (D)	Glenard; P. Lipscomb (R)	George A. Kasem (D)	James; Roosevelt (D)	Harry; R. Sheppard (D)	James; B. Utt (R)	Dalip; Singh; Saund (D)	Bob; Wilson (R)	86th (1959–1961)
Clem; Miller (D)	Bizz; Johnson (D)	John; E. Moss (D)	William; S. Mailliard (R)	John; F. Shelley (D)	John F. Baldwin; Jr. (R)	Jeffery; Cohelan (D)	George; P. Miller (D)	J. Arthur; Younger (R)	Charles; Gubser (R)	John; J. McFall (D)	B. F. Sisk (D)	Charles; M. Teague (R)	Harlan; Hagen (D)	Gordon; L. McDonough (R)	Alphonzo; Bell (R)	Cecil; R. King (D)	Craig; Hosmer (R)	Chet; Holifield (D)	H. Allen; Smith (R)	Edgar W. Hiestand (R)	James C. Corman (D)	Clyde; Doyle (D)	Glenard; P. Lipscomb (R)	John H. Rousselot (R)	James; Roosevelt (D)	Harry; R. Sheppard (D)	James; B. Utt (R)	Dalip; Singh; Saund (D)	Bob; Wilson (R)	87th (1961–1963)

=== 1963–1973: 38 seats ===
Following the 1960 census, California was apportioned 38 seats.

Congress
88th
(1963–1965)
89th
(1965–1967)
90th
(1967–1969)
91st
(1969–1971)
92nd
(1971–1973)

Districts																																						Congress
1st	2nd	3rd	4th	5th	6th	7th	8th	9th	10th	11th	12th	13th	14th	15th	16th	17th	18th	19th	20th	21st	22nd	23rd	24th	25th	26th	27th	28th	29th	30th	31st	32nd	33rd	34th	35th	36th	37th	38th	Congress
Don; Clausen (R)	Bizz; Johnson (D)	John; E. Moss (D)	Robert; Leggett (D)	Jack; Shelley (D)	William; S. Mailliard (R)	Jeffery; Cohelan (D)	George; P. Miller (D)	Don; Edwards (D)	Charles; Gubser (R)	J. Arthur; Younger (R)	Burt; Talcott (R)	Charles; M. Teague (R)	John; F. Baldwin; Jr. (R)	John; J. McFall (D)	B. F. Sisk (D)	Cecil; R. King (D)	Harlan; Hagen (D)	Chet; Holifield (D)	H. Allen; Smith (R)	Augustus; Hawkins (D)	John; C. Corman (D)	Clyde; Doyle (D)	Glenard; P. Lipscomb (R)	Ronald; B. Cameron (D)	James; Roosevelt (D)	Everett G. Burkhalter (D)	Alphonzo; Bell (R)	George; Brown; Jr. (D)	Edward; R. Roybal (D)	Charles; H. Wilson (D)	Craig; Hosmer (R)	Harry R. Sheppard (D)	Richard; T. Hanna (D)	James; B. Utt (R)	Bob; Wilson (R)	Lionel; Van; Deerlin (D)	Patrick M. Martin (R)	88th (1963–1965)
Don; Clausen (R)	Bizz; Johnson (D)	John; E. Moss (D)	Robert; Leggett (D)	Phillip; Burton (D)	William; S. Mailliard (R)	Jeffery; Cohelan (D)	George; P. Miller (D)	Don; Edwards (D)	Charles; Gubser (R)	J. Arthur; Younger (R)	Burt; Talcott (R)	Charles; M. Teague (R)	John; F. Baldwin; Jr. (R)	John; J. McFall (D)	B. F. Sisk (D)	Cecil; R. King (D)	Harlan; Hagen (D)	Chet; Holifield (D)	H. Allen; Smith (R)	Augustus; Hawkins (D)	John; C. Corman (D)	Del M. Clawson (R)	Glenard; P. Lipscomb (R)	Ronald; B. Cameron (D)	James; Roosevelt (D)	Everett G. Burkhalter (D)	Alphonzo; Bell (R)	George; Brown; Jr. (D)	Edward; R. Roybal (D)	Charles; H. Wilson (D)	Craig; Hosmer (R)	Harry R. Sheppard (D)	Richard; T. Hanna (D)	James; B. Utt (R)	Bob; Wilson (R)	Lionel; Van; Deerlin (D)	Patrick M. Martin (R)	88th (1963–1965)
Don; Clausen (R)	Bizz; Johnson (D)	John; E. Moss (D)	Robert; Leggett (D)	Phillip; Burton (D)	William; S. Mailliard (R)	Jeffery; Cohelan (D)	George; P. Miller (D)	Don; Edwards (D)	Charles; Gubser (R)	J. Arthur; Younger (R)	Burt; Talcott (R)	Charles; M. Teague (R)	John; F. Baldwin; Jr. (R)	John; J. McFall (D)	B. F. Sisk (D)	Cecil; R. King (D)	Harlan; Hagen (D)	Chet; Holifield (D)	H. Allen; Smith (R)	Augustus; Hawkins (D)	John; C. Corman (D)	Del M. Clawson (R)	Glenard; P. Lipscomb (R)	Ronald; B. Cameron (D)	James; Roosevelt (D)	Edwin; Reinecke (R)	Alphonzo; Bell (R)	George; Brown; Jr. (D)	Edward; R. Roybal (D)	Charles; H. Wilson (D)	Craig; Hosmer (R)	Kenneth; W. Dyal (D)	Richard; T. Hanna (D)	James; B. Utt (R)	Bob; Wilson (R)	Lionel; Van; Deerlin (D)	John; V. Tunney (D)	89th (1965–1967)
Don; Clausen (R)	Bizz; Johnson (D)	John; E. Moss (D)	Robert; Leggett (D)	Phillip; Burton (D)	William; S. Mailliard (R)	Jeffery; Cohelan (D)	George; P. Miller (D)	Don; Edwards (D)	Charles; Gubser (R)	J. Arthur; Younger (R)	Burt; Talcott (R)	Charles; M. Teague (R)	Jerome; Waldie (D)	John; J. McFall (D)	B. F. Sisk (D)	Cecil; R. King (D)	Harlan; Hagen (D)	Chet; Holifield (D)	H. Allen; Smith (R)	Augustus; Hawkins (D)	John; C. Corman (D)	Del M. Clawson (R)	Glenard; P. Lipscomb (R)	Ronald; B. Cameron (D)	Thomas; M. Rees (D)	Edwin; Reinecke (R)	Alphonzo; Bell (R)	George; Brown; Jr. (D)	Edward; R. Roybal (D)	Charles; H. Wilson (D)	Craig; Hosmer (R)	Kenneth; W. Dyal (D)	Richard; T. Hanna (D)	James; B. Utt (R)	Bob; Wilson (R)	Lionel; Van; Deerlin (D)	John; V. Tunney (D)	89th (1965–1967)
Don; Clausen (R)	Bizz; Johnson (D)	John; E. Moss (D)	Robert; Leggett (D)	Phillip; Burton (D)	William; S. Mailliard (R)	Jeffery; Cohelan (D)	George; P. Miller (D)	Don; Edwards (D)	Charles; Gubser (R)	J. Arthur; Younger (R)	Burt; Talcott (R)	Charles; M. Teague (R)	Jerome; Waldie (D)	John; J. McFall (D)	B. F. Sisk (D)	Cecil; R. King (D)	Bob; Mathias (R)	Chet; Holifield (D)	H. Allen; Smith (R)	Augustus; Hawkins (D)	John; C. Corman (D)	Del M. Clawson (R)	Glenard; P. Lipscomb (R)	Charles; E. Wiggins (R)	Thomas; M. Rees (D)	Edwin; Reinecke (R)	Alphonzo; Bell (R)	George; Brown; Jr. (D)	Edward; R. Roybal (D)	Charles; H. Wilson (D)	Craig; Hosmer (R)	Jerry; Pettis (R)	Richard; T. Hanna (D)	James; B. Utt (R)	Bob; Wilson (R)	Lionel; Van; Deerlin (D)	John; V. Tunney (D)	90th (1967–1969)
Don; Clausen (R)	Bizz; Johnson (D)	John; E. Moss (D)	Robert; Leggett (D)	Phillip; Burton (D)	William; S. Mailliard (R)	Jeffery; Cohelan (D)	George; P. Miller (D)	Don; Edwards (D)	Charles; Gubser (R)	Pete; McCloskey (R)	Burt; Talcott (R)	Charles; M. Teague (R)	Jerome; Waldie (D)	John; J. McFall (D)	B. F. Sisk (D)	Cecil; R. King (D)	Bob; Mathias (R)	Chet; Holifield (D)	H. Allen; Smith (R)	Augustus; Hawkins (D)	John; C. Corman (D)	Del M. Clawson (R)	Glenard; P. Lipscomb (R)	Charles; E. Wiggins (R)	Thomas; M. Rees (D)	Barry; Goldwater; Jr. (R)	Alphonzo; Bell (R)	George; Brown; Jr. (D)	Edward; R. Roybal (D)	Charles; H. Wilson (D)	Craig; Hosmer (R)	Jerry; Pettis (R)	Richard; T. Hanna (D)	James; B. Utt (R)	Bob; Wilson (R)	Lionel; Van; Deerlin (D)	John; V. Tunney (D)	90th (1967–1969)
Don; Clausen (R)	Bizz; Johnson (D)	John; E. Moss (D)	Robert; Leggett (D)	Phillip; Burton (D)	William; S. Mailliard (R)	Jeffery; Cohelan (D)	George; P. Miller (D)	Don; Edwards (D)	Charles; Gubser (R)	Pete; McCloskey (R)	Burt; Talcott (R)	Charles; M. Teague (R)	Jerome; Waldie (D)	John; J. McFall (D)	B. F. Sisk (D)	Glenn M. Anderson (D)	Bob; Mathias (R)	Chet; Holifield (D)	H. Allen; Smith (R)	Augustus; Hawkins (D)	John; C. Corman (D)	Del M. Clawson (R)	Glenard; P. Lipscomb (R)	Charles; E. Wiggins (R)	Thomas; M. Rees (D)	Barry; Goldwater; Jr. (R)	Alphonzo; Bell (R)	George; Brown; Jr. (D)	Edward; R. Roybal (D)	Charles; H. Wilson (D)	Craig; Hosmer (R)	Jerry; Pettis (R)	Richard; T. Hanna (D)	James; B. Utt (R)	Bob; Wilson (R)	Lionel; Van; Deerlin (D)	John; V. Tunney (D)	91st (1969–1971)
Don; Clausen (R)	Bizz; Johnson (D)	John; E. Moss (D)	Robert; Leggett (D)	Phillip; Burton (D)	William; S. Mailliard (R)	Jeffery; Cohelan (D)	George; P. Miller (D)	Don; Edwards (D)	Charles; Gubser (R)	Pete; McCloskey (R)	Burt; Talcott (R)	Charles; M. Teague (R)	Jerome; Waldie (D)	John; J. McFall (D)	B. F. Sisk (D)	Glenn M. Anderson (D)	Bob; Mathias (R)	Chet; Holifield (D)	H. Allen; Smith (R)	Augustus; Hawkins (D)	John; C. Corman (D)	Del M. Clawson (R)	John H. Rousselot (R)	Charles; E. Wiggins (R)	Thomas; M. Rees (D)	Barry; Goldwater; Jr. (R)	Alphonzo; Bell (R)	George; Brown; Jr. (D)	Edward; R. Roybal (D)	Charles; H. Wilson (D)	Craig; Hosmer (R)	Jerry; Pettis (R)	Richard; T. Hanna (D)	John G. Schmitz (R)	Bob; Wilson (R)	Lionel; Van; Deerlin (D)	John; V. Tunney (D)	91st (1969–1971)
Don; Clausen (R)	Bizz; Johnson (D)	John; E. Moss (D)	Robert; Leggett (D)	Phillip; Burton (D)	William; S. Mailliard (R)	Ron; Dellums (D)	George; P. Miller (D)	Don; Edwards (D)	Charles; Gubser (R)	Pete; McCloskey (R)	Burt; Talcott (R)	Charles; M. Teague (R)	Jerome; Waldie (D)	John; J. McFall (D)	B. F. Sisk (D)	Glenn M. Anderson (D)	Bob; Mathias (R)	Chet; Holifield (D)	H. Allen; Smith (R)	Augustus; Hawkins (D)	John; C. Corman (D)	Del M. Clawson (R)	John H. Rousselot (R)	Charles; E. Wiggins (R)	Thomas; M. Rees (D)	Barry; Goldwater; Jr. (R)	Alphonzo; Bell (R)	George E. Danielson (D)	Edward; R. Roybal (D)	Charles; H. Wilson (D)	Craig; Hosmer (R)	Jerry; Pettis (R)	Richard; T. Hanna (D)	John G. Schmitz (R)	Bob; Wilson (R)	Lionel; Van; Deerlin (D)	Victor; Veysey (R)	92nd (1971–1973)

=== 1973–1983: 43 seats ===
Following the 1970 census, California was apportioned 43 seats.

Congress
93rd
(1973–1975)
94th
(1975–1977)
95th
(1977–1979)
96th
(1979–1981)
97th
(1981–1983)

Districts																																											Congress
1st	2nd	3rd	4th	5th	6th	7th	8th	9th	10th	11th	12th	13th	14th	15th	16th	17th	18th	19th	20th	21st	22nd	23rd	24th	25th	26th	27th	28th	29th	30th	31st	32nd	33rd	34th	35th	36th	37th	38th	39th	40th	41st	42nd	43rd	Congress
Don; Clausen (R)	Bizz; Johnson (D)	John; E. Moss (D)	Robert; Leggett (D)	Phillip; Burton (D)	William S. Mailliard (R)	Ron; Dellums (D)	Pete; Stark (D)	Don; Edwards (D)	Charles; Gubser (R)	Leo; Ryan (D)	Burt; Talcott (R)	Charles M. Teague (R)	Jerome; Waldie (D)	John J. McFall (D)	B. F. Sisk (D)	Pete; McCloskey (R)	Bob; Mathias (R)	Chet; Holifield (D)	Carlos; Moorhead (R)	Augustus; Hawkins (D)	James C. Corman (D)	Del M. Clawson (R)	John H. Rousselot (R)	Charles E. Wiggins (R)	Thomas; M. Rees (D)	Barry; Goldwater; Jr. (R)	Alphonzo; Bell (R)	George E. Danielson (D)	Edward R. Roybal (D)	Charles; H. Wilson (D)	Craig; Hosmer (R)	Jerry; Pettis (R)	Richard T. Hanna (D)	Glenn M. Anderson (D)	William; M. Ketchum (R)	Yvonne; Brathwaite; Burke (D)	George; Brown; Jr. (D)	Andrew; J. Hinshaw (R)	Bob; Wilson (R)	Lionel; Van; Deerlin (D)	Clair; Burgener (R)	Victor; Veysey (R)	93rd (1973–1975)
Don; Clausen (R)	Bizz; Johnson (D)	John; E. Moss (D)	Robert; Leggett (D)	Phillip; Burton (D)	John; Burton (D)	Ron; Dellums (D)	Pete; Stark (D)	Don; Edwards (D)	Charles; Gubser (R)	Leo; Ryan (D)	Burt; Talcott (R)	Bob Lago- marsino (R)	Jerome; Waldie (D)	John J. McFall (D)	B. F. Sisk (D)	Pete; McCloskey (R)	Bob; Mathias (R)	Chet; Holifield (D)	Carlos; Moorhead (R)	Augustus; Hawkins (D)	James C. Corman (D)	Del M. Clawson (R)	John H. Rousselot (R)	Charles E. Wiggins (R)	Thomas; M. Rees (D)	Barry; Goldwater; Jr. (R)	Alphonzo; Bell (R)	George E. Danielson (D)	Edward R. Roybal (D)	Charles; H. Wilson (D)	Craig; Hosmer (R)	Jerry; Pettis (R)	Richard T. Hanna (D)	Glenn M. Anderson (D)	William; M. Ketchum (R)	Yvonne; Brathwaite; Burke (D)	George; Brown; Jr. (D)	Andrew; J. Hinshaw (R)	Bob; Wilson (R)	Lionel; Van; Deerlin (D)	Clair; Burgener (R)	Victor; Veysey (R)	93rd (1973–1975)
Bizz; Johnson (D)	Don; Clausen (R)	John; E. Moss (D)	Robert; Leggett (D)	John; Burton (D)	Phillip; Burton (D)	George; Miller (D)	Ron; Dellums (D)	Pete; Stark (D)	Don; Edwards (D)	Leo; Ryan (D)	Pete; McCloskey (R)	Norman; Mineta (D)	John J. McFall (D)	B. F. Sisk (D)	Burt; Talcott (R)	John; Hans; Krebs (D)	William; Ketchum (R)	Bob; Lago- marsino (R)	Barry; Goldwater; Jr. (R)	James C. Corman (D)	Carlos; Moorhead (R)	Thomas; M. Rees (D)	Henry; Waxman (D)	Edward; B. Roybal (D)	John H. Rousselot (R)	Alphonzo; E. Bell Jr. (R)	Yvonne; Brathwaite; Burke (D)	Augustus; Hawkins (D)	George E. Danielson (D)	Charles; H. Wilson (D)	Glenn M. Anderson (D)	Del M. Clawson (R)	Mark W. Hannaford (D)	James F. Lloyd (D)	George; Brown; Jr. (D)	Jerry; Pettis (R)	Jerry M. Patterson (D)	Charles; E. Wiggins (R)	Andrew J. Hinshaw (R)	Bob; Wilson (R)	Lionel; Van; Deerlin (D)	Clair; Burgener (R)	94th (1975–1977)
Bizz; Johnson (D)	Don; Clausen (R)	John; E. Moss (D)	Robert; Leggett (D)	John; Burton (D)	Phillip; Burton (D)	George; Miller (D)	Ron; Dellums (D)	Pete; Stark (D)	Don; Edwards (D)	Leo; Ryan (D)	Pete; McCloskey (R)	Norman; Mineta (D)	John J. McFall (D)	B. F. Sisk (D)	Burt; Talcott (R)	John; Hans; Krebs (D)	William; Ketchum (R)	Bob; Lago- marsino (R)	Barry; Goldwater; Jr. (R)	James C. Corman (D)	Carlos; Moorhead (R)	Thomas; M. Rees (D)	Henry; Waxman (D)	Edward; B. Roybal (D)	John H. Rousselot (R)	Alphonzo; E. Bell Jr. (R)	Yvonne; Brathwaite; Burke (D)	Augustus; Hawkins (D)	George E. Danielson (D)	Charles; H. Wilson (D)	Glenn M. Anderson (D)	Del M. Clawson (R)	Mark W. Hannaford (D)	James F. Lloyd (D)	George; Brown; Jr. (D)	Shirley; Neil; Pettis (R)	Jerry M. Patterson (D)	Charles; E. Wiggins (R)	Andrew J. Hinshaw (R)	Bob; Wilson (R)	Lionel; Van; Deerlin (D)	Clair; Burgener (R)	94th (1975–1977)
Bizz; Johnson (D)	Don; Clausen (R)	John; E. Moss (D)	Robert; Leggett (D)	John; Burton (D)	Phillip; Burton (D)	George; Miller (D)	Ron; Dellums (D)	Pete; Stark (D)	Don; Edwards (D)	Leo; Ryan (D)	Pete; McCloskey (R)	Norman; Mineta (D)	John J. McFall (D)	B. F. Sisk (D)	Leon; Panetta (D)	John; Hans; Krebs (D)	William; Ketchum (R)	Bob; Lago- marsino (R)	Barry; Goldwater; Jr. (R)	James C. Corman (D)	Carlos; Moorhead (R)	Anthony; Beilenson (D)	Henry; Waxman (D)	Edward; B. Roybal (D)	John H. Rousselot (R)	Bob; Dornan (R)	Yvonne; Brathwaite; Burke (D)	Augustus; Hawkins (D)	George E. Danielson (D)	Charles; H. Wilson (D)	Glenn M. Anderson (D)	Del M. Clawson (R)	Mark W. Hannaford (D)	James F. Lloyd (D)	George; Brown; Jr. (D)	Shirley; Neil; Pettis (R)	Jerry M. Patterson (D)	Charles; E. Wiggins (R)	Robert; Badham (R)	Bob; Wilson (R)	Lionel; Van; Deerlin (D)	Clair; Burgener (R)	95th (1977–1979)
Bizz; Johnson (D)	Don; Clausen (R)	Bob; Matsui (D)	Vic; Fazio (D)	John; Burton (D)	Phillip; Burton (D)	George; Miller (D)	Ron; Dellums (D)	Pete; Stark (D)	Don; Edwards (D)	William; Royer (R)	Pete; McCloskey (R)	Norman; Mineta (D)	Norman; D. Shumway (R)	Tony; Coelho (D)	Leon; Panetta (D)	Chip; Pashayan (R)	Bill; Thomas (R)	Bob; Lago- marsino (R)	Barry; Goldwater; Jr. (R)	James C. Corman (D)	Carlos; Moorhead (R)	Anthony; Beilenson (D)	Henry; Waxman (D)	Edward; B. Roybal (D)	John H. Rousselot (R)	Bob; Dornan (R)	Julian; Dixon (D)	Augustus; Hawkins (D)	George E. Danielson (D)	Charles; H. Wilson (D)	Glenn M. Anderson (D)	Wayne R. Grisham (R)	Dan; Lungren (R)	James F. Lloyd (D)	George; Brown; Jr. (D)	Jerry; Lewis (R)	Jerry M. Patterson (D)	William; Danne- meyer (R)	Robert; Badham (R)	Bob; Wilson (R)	Lionel; Van; Deerlin (D)	Clair; Burgener (R)	96th (1979–1981)
Gene; Chappie (R)	Don; Clausen (R)	Bob; Matsui (D)	Vic; Fazio (D)	John; Burton (D)	Phillip; Burton (D)	George; Miller (D)	Ron; Dellums (D)	Pete; Stark (D)	Don; Edwards (D)	Tom; Lantos (D)	Pete; McCloskey (R)	Norman; Mineta (D)	Norman; D. Shumway (R)	Tony; Coelho (D)	Leon; Panetta (D)	Chip; Pashayan (R)	Bill; Thomas (R)	Bob; Lago- marsino (R)	Barry; Goldwater; Jr. (R)	Bobbi; Fiedler (R)	Carlos; Moorhead (R)	Anthony; Beilenson (D)	Henry; Waxman (D)	Edward; B. Roybal (D)	John H. Rousselot (R)	Bob; Dornan (R)	Julian; Dixon (D)	Augustus; Hawkins (D)	George E. Danielson (D)	Mervyn; Dymally (D)	Glenn M. Anderson (D)	Wayne R. Grisham (R)	Dan; Lungren (R)	David; Dreier (R)	George; Brown; Jr. (D)	Jerry; Lewis (R)	Jerry M. Patterson (D)	William; Danne- meyer (R)	Robert; Badham (R)	Bill; Lowery (R)	Duncan L. Hunter (R)	Clair; Burgener (R)	97th (1981–1983)
Gene; Chappie (R)	Don; Clausen (R)	Bob; Matsui (D)	Vic; Fazio (D)	John; Burton (D)	Phillip; Burton (D)	George; Miller (D)	Ron; Dellums (D)	Pete; Stark (D)	Don; Edwards (D)	Tom; Lantos (D)	Pete; McCloskey (R)	Norman; Mineta (D)	Norman; D. Shumway (R)	Tony; Coelho (D)	Leon; Panetta (D)	Chip; Pashayan (R)	Bill; Thomas (R)	Bob; Lago- marsino (R)	Barry; Goldwater; Jr. (R)	Bobbi; Fiedler (R)	Carlos; Moorhead (R)	Anthony; Beilenson (D)	Henry; Waxman (D)	Edward; B. Roybal (D)	John H. Rousselot (R)	Bob; Dornan (R)	Julian; Dixon (D)	Augustus; Hawkins (D)	Marty; Martínez (D)	Mervyn; Dymally (D)	Glenn M. Anderson (D)	Wayne R. Grisham (R)	Dan; Lungren (R)	David; Dreier (R)	George; Brown; Jr. (D)	Jerry; Lewis (R)	Jerry M. Patterson (D)	William; Danne- meyer (R)	Robert; Badham (R)	Bill; Lowery (R)	Duncan L. Hunter (R)	Clair; Burgener (R)	97th (1981–1983)

=== 1983–1993: 45 seats ===
Following the 1980 census, California was apportioned 45 seats.

Congress
98th
(1983–1985)
99th
(1985–1987)
100th
(1987–1989)
101st
(1989–1991)
102nd
(1991–1993)

Districts																																													Congress
1st	2nd	3rd	4th	5th	6th	7th	8th	9th	10th	11th	12th	13th	14th	15th	16th	17th	18th	19th	20th	21st	22nd	23rd	24th	25th	26th	27th	28th	29th	30th	31st	32nd	33rd	34th	35th	36th	37th	38th	39th	40th	41st	42nd	43rd	44th	45th	Congress
Douglas; Bosco (D)	Gene; Chappie (R)	Bob; Matsui (D)	Vic; Fazio (D)	Phillip; Burton (D)	Barbara; Boxer (D)	George; Miller (D)	Ron; Dellums (D)	Pete; Stark (D)	Don; Edwards (D)	Tom; Lantos (D)	Ed; Zschau (R)	Norman; Mineta (D)	Norman; D. Shumway (R)	Tony; Coelho (D)	Leon; Panetta (D)	Chip; Pashayan (R)	Rick; Lehman (D)	Bob; Lago- marsino (R)	Bill; Thomas (R)	Bobbi; Fiedler (R)	Carlos; Moor- head (R)	Anthony; Beilenson (D)	Henry; Waxman (D)	Edward; R. Roybal (D)	Howard; Berman (D)	Mel; Levine (D)	Julian; Dixon (D)	Augustus; Hawkins (D)	Marty; Martínez (D)	Mervyn; Dymally (D)	Glenn M. Anderson (D)	David; Dreier (R)	Esteban; Torres (D)	Jerry; Lewis (R)	George; Brown; Jr. (D)	Al; McCand- less (R)	Jerry M. Patter- son (D)	William; Dan- nemeyer (R)	Robert; Badham (R)	Bill; Lowery (R)	Dan; Lungren (R)	Ron; Packard (R)	Jim; Bates (D)	Duncan; L. Hunter (R)	98th (1983–1985)
Douglas; Bosco (D)	Gene; Chappie (R)	Bob; Matsui (D)	Vic; Fazio (D)	Sala; Burton (D)	Barbara; Boxer (D)	George; Miller (D)	Ron; Dellums (D)	Pete; Stark (D)	Don; Edwards (D)	Tom; Lantos (D)	Ed; Zschau (R)	Norman; Mineta (D)	Norman; D. Shumway (R)	Tony; Coelho (D)	Leon; Panetta (D)	Chip; Pashayan (R)	Rick; Lehman (D)	Bob; Lago- marsino (R)	Bill; Thomas (R)	Bobbi; Fiedler (R)	Carlos; Moor- head (R)	Anthony; Beilenson (D)	Henry; Waxman (D)	Edward; R. Roybal (D)	Howard; Berman (D)	Mel; Levine (D)	Julian; Dixon (D)	Augustus; Hawkins (D)	Marty; Martínez (D)	Mervyn; Dymally (D)	Glenn M. Anderson (D)	David; Dreier (R)	Esteban; Torres (D)	Jerry; Lewis (R)	George; Brown; Jr. (D)	Al; McCand- less (R)	Jerry M. Patter- son (D)	William; Dan- nemeyer (R)	Robert; Badham (R)	Bill; Lowery (R)	Dan; Lungren (R)	Ron; Packard (R)	Jim; Bates (D)	Duncan; L. Hunter (R)	98th (1983–1985)
Douglas; Bosco (D)	Gene; Chappie (R)	Bob; Matsui (D)	Vic; Fazio (D)	Sala; Burton (D)	Barbara; Boxer (D)	George; Miller (D)	Ron; Dellums (D)	Pete; Stark (D)	Don; Edwards (D)	Tom; Lantos (D)	Ed; Zschau (R)	Norman; Mineta (D)	Norman; D. Shumway (R)	Tony; Coelho (D)	Leon; Panetta (D)	Chip; Pashayan (R)	Rick; Lehman (D)	Bob; Lago- marsino (R)	Bill; Thomas (R)	Bobbi; Fiedler (R)	Carlos; Moor- head (R)	Anthony; Beilenson (D)	Henry; Waxman (D)	Edward; R. Roybal (D)	Howard; Berman (D)	Mel; Levine (D)	Julian; Dixon (D)	Augustus; Hawkins (D)	Marty; Martínez (D)	Mervyn; Dymally (D)	Glenn M. Anderson (D)	David; Dreier (R)	Esteban; Torres (D)	Jerry; Lewis (R)	George; Brown; Jr. (D)	Al; McCand- less (R)	Bob; Dornan (R)	William; Dan- nemeyer (R)	Robert; Badham (R)	Bill; Lowery (R)	Dan; Lungren (R)	Ron; Packard (R)	Jim; Bates (D)	Duncan; L. Hunter (R)	99th (1985–1987)
Douglas; Bosco (D)	Gene; Chappie (R)	Bob; Matsui (D)	Vic; Fazio (D)	Nancy; Pelosi (D)	Barbara; Boxer (D)	George; Miller (D)	Ron; Dellums (D)	Pete; Stark (D)	Don; Edwards (D)	Tom; Lantos (D)	Ed; Zschau (R)	Norman; Mineta (D)	Norman; D. Shumway (R)	Tony; Coelho (D)	Leon; Panetta (D)	Chip; Pashayan (R)	Rick; Lehman (D)	Bob; Lago- marsino (R)	Bill; Thomas (R)	Bobbi; Fiedler (R)	Carlos; Moor- head (R)	Anthony; Beilenson (D)	Henry; Waxman (D)	Edward; R. Roybal (D)	Howard; Berman (D)	Mel; Levine (D)	Julian; Dixon (D)	Augustus; Hawkins (D)	Marty; Martínez (D)	Mervyn; Dymally (D)	Glenn M. Anderson (D)	David; Dreier (R)	Esteban; Torres (D)	Jerry; Lewis (R)	George; Brown; Jr. (D)	Al; McCand- less (R)	Bob; Dornan (R)	William; Dan- nemeyer (R)	Robert; Badham (R)	Bill; Lowery (R)	Dan; Lungren (R)	Ron; Packard (R)	Jim; Bates (D)	Duncan; L. Hunter (R)	99th (1985–1987)
Douglas; Bosco (D)	Wally; Herger (R)	Bob; Matsui (D)	Vic; Fazio (D)	Nancy; Pelosi (D)	Barbara; Boxer (D)	George; Miller (D)	Ron; Dellums (D)	Pete; Stark (D)	Don; Edwards (D)	Tom; Lantos (D)	Ernie; Konnyu (R)	Norman; Mineta (D)	Norman; D. Shumway (R)	Tony; Coelho (D)	Leon; Panetta (D)	Chip; Pashayan (R)	Rick; Lehman (D)	Bob; Lago- marsino (R)	Bill; Thomas (R)	Elton; Gallegly (R)	Carlos; Moor- head (R)	Anthony; Beilenson (D)	Henry; Waxman (D)	Edward; R. Roybal (D)	Howard; Berman (D)	Mel; Levine (D)	Julian; Dixon (D)	Augustus; Hawkins (D)	Marty; Martínez (D)	Mervyn; Dymally (D)	Glenn M. Anderson (D)	David; Dreier (R)	Esteban; Torres (D)	Jerry; Lewis (R)	George; Brown; Jr. (D)	Al; McCand- less (R)	Bob; Dornan (R)	William; Dan- nemeyer (R)	Robert; Badham (R)	Bill; Lowery (R)	Dan; Lungren (R)	Ron; Packard (R)	Jim; Bates (D)	Duncan; L. Hunter (R)	100th (1987–1989)
Douglas; Bosco (D)	Wally; Herger (R)	Bob; Matsui (D)	Vic; Fazio (D)	Nancy; Pelosi (D)	Barbara; Boxer (D)	George; Miller (D)	Ron; Dellums (D)	Pete; Stark (D)	Don; Edwards (D)	Tom; Lantos (D)	Tom; Campbell (R)	Norman; Mineta (D)	Norman; D. Shumway (R)	Tony; Coelho (D)	Leon; Panetta (D)	Chip; Pashayan (R)	Rick; Lehman (D)	Bob; Lago- marsino (R)	Bill; Thomas (R)	Elton; Gallegly (R)	Carlos; Moor- head (R)	Anthony; Beilenson (D)	Henry; Waxman (D)	Edward; R. Roybal (D)	Howard; Berman (D)	Mel; Levine (D)	Julian; Dixon (D)	Augustus; Hawkins (D)	Marty; Martínez (D)	Mervyn; Dymally (D)	Glenn M. Anderson (D)	David; Dreier (R)	Esteban; Torres (D)	Jerry; Lewis (R)	George; Brown; Jr. (D)	Al; McCand- less (R)	Bob; Dornan (R)	William; Dan- nemeyer (R)	Chris- topher Cox (R)	Bill; Lowery (R)	Dana; Rohra- bacher (R)	Ron; Packard (R)	Jim; Bates (D)	Duncan; L. Hunter (R)	101st (1989–1991)
Douglas; Bosco (D)	Wally; Herger (R)	Bob; Matsui (D)	Vic; Fazio (D)	Nancy; Pelosi (D)	Barbara; Boxer (D)	George; Miller (D)	Ron; Dellums (D)	Pete; Stark (D)	Don; Edwards (D)	Tom; Lantos (D)	Tom; Campbell (R)	Norman; Mineta (D)	Norman; D. Shumway (R)	Gary; Condit (D)	Leon; Panetta (D)	Chip; Pashayan (R)	Rick; Lehman (D)	Bob; Lago- marsino (R)	Bill; Thomas (R)	Elton; Gallegly (R)	Carlos; Moor- head (R)	Anthony; Beilenson (D)	Henry; Waxman (D)	Edward; R. Roybal (D)	Howard; Berman (D)	Mel; Levine (D)	Julian; Dixon (D)	Augustus; Hawkins (D)	Marty; Martínez (D)	Mervyn; Dymally (D)	Glenn M. Anderson (D)	David; Dreier (R)	Esteban; Torres (D)	Jerry; Lewis (R)	George; Brown; Jr. (D)	Al; McCand- less (R)	Bob; Dornan (R)	William; Dan- nemeyer (R)	Chris- topher Cox (R)	Bill; Lowery (R)	Dana; Rohra- bacher (R)	Ron; Packard (R)	Jim; Bates (D)	Duncan; L. Hunter (R)	101st (1989–1991)
Frank; Riggs (R)	Wally; Herger (R)	Bob; Matsui (D)	Vic; Fazio (D)	Nancy; Pelosi (D)	Barbara; Boxer (D)	George; Miller (D)	Ron; Dellums (D)	Pete; Stark (D)	Don; Edwards (D)	Tom; Lantos (D)	Tom; Campbell (R)	Norman; Mineta (D)	John; Doolittle (R)	Gary; Condit (D)	Leon; Panetta (D)	Cal; Dooley (D)	Rick; Lehman (D)	Bob; Lago- marsino (R)	Bill; Thomas (R)	Elton; Gallegly (R)	Carlos; Moor- head (R)	Anthony; Beilenson (D)	Henry; Waxman (D)	Edward; R. Roybal (D)	Howard; Berman (D)	Mel; Levine (D)	Julian; Dixon (D)	Maxine; Waters (D)	Marty; Martínez (D)	Mervyn; Dymally (D)	Glenn M. Anderson (D)	David; Dreier (R)	Esteban; Torres (D)	Jerry; Lewis (R)	George; Brown; Jr. (D)	Al; McCand- less (R)	Bob; Dornan (R)	William; Dan- nemeyer (R)	Chris- topher Cox (R)	Bill; Lowery (R)	Dana; Rohra- bacher (R)	Ron; Packard (R)	Duke Cun- ningham (R)	Duncan; L. Hunter (R)	102nd (1991–1993)

=== 1993–2003: 52 seats ===
Following the 1990 census, California was apportioned 52 seats.

Congress
103rd
(1993–1995)
104th
(1995–1997)
105th
(1997–1999)
106th
(1999–2001)
107th
(2001–2003)

Districts																																																				Congress
1st	2nd	3rd	4th	5th	6th	7th	8th	9th	10th	11th	12th	13th	14th	15th	16th	17th	18th	19th	20th	21st	22nd	23rd	24th	25th	26th	27th	28th	29th	30th	31st	32nd	33rd	34th	35th	36th	37th	38th	39th	40th	41st	42nd	43rd	44th	45th	46th	47th	48th	49th	50th	51st	52nd	Congress
Dan; Hamburg (D)	Wally; Herger (R)	Vic; Fazio (D)	John; Doolittle (R)	Bob; Matsui (D)	Lynn; Woolsey (D)	George; Miller (D)	Nancy; Pelosi (D)	Ron; Dellums (D)	Bill; Baker (R)	Richard; Pombo (R)	Tom; Lantos (D)	Pete; Stark (D)	Anna; Eshoo (D)	Norman; Mineta (D)	Don; Edwards (D)	Leon; Panetta (D)	Gary; Condit (D)	Rick; Lehman (D)	Cal; Dooley (D)	Bill; Thomas (R)	Michael; Huffington (R)	Elton; Gallegly (R)	Anthony; Beilenson (D)	Buck; McKeon (R)	Howard; Berman (D)	Carlos; Moorhead (R)	David; Dreier (R)	Henry; Waxman (D)	Xavier; Becerra (D)	Marty; Martínez (D)	Julian; Dixon (D)	Lucille; Roybal- Allard (D)	Esteban; Torres (D)	Maxine; Waters (D)	Jane; Harman (D)	Walter R. Tucker III (D)	Steve; Horn (R)	Ed; Royce (R)	Jerry; Lewis (R)	Jay; Kim (R)	George; Brown; Jr. (D)	Ken; Calvert (R)	Al; McCand- less (R)	Dana; Rohra- bacher (R)	Bob; Dornan (R)	Christopher; Cox (R)	Ron; Packard (R)	Lynn; Schenk (D)	Bob; Filner (D)	Duke; Cunning- ham (R)	Duncan; L. Hunter (R)	103rd (1993–1995)
Dan; Hamburg (D)	Wally; Herger (R)	Vic; Fazio (D)	John; Doolittle (R)	Bob; Matsui (D)	Lynn; Woolsey (D)	George; Miller (D)	Nancy; Pelosi (D)	Ron; Dellums (D)	Bill; Baker (R)	Richard; Pombo (R)	Tom; Lantos (D)	Pete; Stark (D)	Anna; Eshoo (D)	Norman; Mineta (D)	Don; Edwards (D)	Sam; Farr (D)	Gary; Condit (D)	Rick; Lehman (D)	Cal; Dooley (D)	Bill; Thomas (R)	Michael; Huffington (R)	Elton; Gallegly (R)	Anthony; Beilenson (D)	Buck; McKeon (R)	Howard; Berman (D)	Carlos; Moorhead (R)	David; Dreier (R)	Henry; Waxman (D)	Xavier; Becerra (D)	Marty; Martínez (D)	Julian; Dixon (D)	Lucille; Roybal- Allard (D)	Esteban; Torres (D)	Maxine; Waters (D)	Jane; Harman (D)	Walter R. Tucker III (D)	Steve; Horn (R)	Ed; Royce (R)	Jerry; Lewis (R)	Jay; Kim (R)	George; Brown; Jr. (D)	Ken; Calvert (R)	Al; McCand- less (R)	Dana; Rohra- bacher (R)	Bob; Dornan (R)	Christopher; Cox (R)	Ron; Packard (R)	Lynn; Schenk (D)	Bob; Filner (D)	Duke; Cunning- ham (R)	Duncan; L. Hunter (R)	103rd (1993–1995)
Frank; Riggs (R)	Wally; Herger (R)	Vic; Fazio (D)	John; Doolittle (R)	Bob; Matsui (D)	Lynn; Woolsey (D)	George; Miller (D)	Nancy; Pelosi (D)	Ron; Dellums (D)	Bill; Baker (R)	Richard; Pombo (R)	Tom; Lantos (D)	Pete; Stark (D)	Anna; Eshoo (D)	Norman; Mineta (D)	Zoe; Lofgren (D)	Sam; Farr (D)	Gary; Condit (D)	George; Radanovich (R)	Cal; Dooley (D)	Bill; Thomas (R)	Andrea; Seastrand (R)	Elton; Gallegly (R)	Anthony; Beilenson (D)	Buck; McKeon (R)	Howard; Berman (D)	Carlos; Moorhead (R)	David; Dreier (R)	Henry; Waxman (D)	Xavier; Becerra (D)	Marty; Martínez (D)	Julian; Dixon (D)	Lucille; Roybal- Allard (D)	Esteban; Torres (D)	Maxine; Waters (D)	Jane; Harman (D)	Walter R. Tucker III (D)	Steve; Horn (R)	Ed; Royce (R)	Jerry; Lewis (R)	Jay; Kim (R)	George; Brown; Jr. (D)	Ken; Calvert (R)	Sonny; Bono (R)	Dana; Rohra- bacher (R)	Bob; Dornan (R)	Christopher; Cox (R)	Ron; Packard (R)	Brian; Bilbray (R)	Bob; Filner (D)	Duke; Cunning- ham (R)	Duncan; L. Hunter (R)	104th (1995–1997)
Frank; Riggs (R)	Wally; Herger (R)	Vic; Fazio (D)	John; Doolittle (R)	Bob; Matsui (D)	Lynn; Woolsey (D)	George; Miller (D)	Nancy; Pelosi (D)	Ron; Dellums (D)	Bill; Baker (R)	Richard; Pombo (R)	Tom; Lantos (D)	Pete; Stark (D)	Anna; Eshoo (D)	Tom; Campbell (R)	Zoe; Lofgren (D)	Sam; Farr (D)	Gary; Condit (D)	George; Radanovich (R)	Cal; Dooley (D)	Bill; Thomas (R)	Andrea; Seastrand (R)	Elton; Gallegly (R)	Anthony; Beilenson (D)	Buck; McKeon (R)	Howard; Berman (D)	Carlos; Moorhead (R)	David; Dreier (R)	Henry; Waxman (D)	Xavier; Becerra (D)	Marty; Martínez (D)	Julian; Dixon (D)	Lucille; Roybal- Allard (D)	Esteban; Torres (D)	Maxine; Waters (D)	Jane; Harman (D)	Juanita; Millender- McDonald (D)	Steve; Horn (R)	Ed; Royce (R)	Jerry; Lewis (R)	Jay; Kim (R)	George; Brown; Jr. (D)	Ken; Calvert (R)	Sonny; Bono (R)	Dana; Rohra- bacher (R)	Bob; Dornan (R)	Christopher; Cox (R)	Ron; Packard (R)	Brian; Bilbray (R)	Bob; Filner (D)	Duke; Cunning- ham (R)	Duncan; L. Hunter (R)	104th (1995–1997)
Frank; Riggs (R)	Wally; Herger (R)	Vic; Fazio (D)	John; Doolittle (R)	Bob; Matsui (D)	Lynn; Woolsey (D)	George; Miller (D)	Nancy; Pelosi (D)	Ron; Dellums (D)	Ellen; Tauscher (D)	Richard; Pombo (R)	Tom; Lantos (D)	Pete; Stark (D)	Anna; Eshoo (D)	Tom; Campbell (R)	Zoe; Lofgren (D)	Sam; Farr (D)	Gary; Condit (D)	George; Radanovich (R)	Cal; Dooley (D)	Bill; Thomas (R)	Walter; Capps (D)	Elton; Gallegly (R)	Brad; Sherman (D)	Buck; McKeon (R)	Howard; Berman (D)	James E. Rogan (R)	David; Dreier (R)	Henry; Waxman (D)	Xavier; Becerra (D)	Marty; Martínez (D)	Julian; Dixon (D)	Lucille; Roybal- Allard (D)	Esteban; Torres (D)	Maxine; Waters (D)	Jane; Harman (D)	Juanita; Millender- McDonald (D)	Steve; Horn (R)	Ed; Royce (R)	Jerry; Lewis (R)	Jay; Kim (R)	George; Brown; Jr. (D)	Ken; Calvert (R)	Sonny; Bono (R)	Dana; Rohra- bacher (R)	Loretta; Sanchez (D)	Christopher; Cox (R)	Ron; Packard (R)	Brian; Bilbray (R)	Bob; Filner (D)	Duke; Cunning- ham (R)	Duncan; L. Hunter (R)	105th (1997–1999)
Frank; Riggs (R)	Wally; Herger (R)	Vic; Fazio (D)	John; Doolittle (R)	Bob; Matsui (D)	Lynn; Woolsey (D)	George; Miller (D)	Nancy; Pelosi (D)	Barbara; Lee (D)	Ellen; Tauscher (D)	Richard; Pombo (R)	Tom; Lantos (D)	Pete; Stark (D)	Anna; Eshoo (D)	Tom; Campbell (R)	Zoe; Lofgren (D)	Sam; Farr (D)	Gary; Condit (D)	George; Radanovich (R)	Cal; Dooley (D)	Bill; Thomas (R)	Lois; Capps (D)	Elton; Gallegly (R)	Brad; Sherman (D)	Buck; McKeon (R)	Howard; Berman (D)	James E. Rogan (R)	David; Dreier (R)	Henry; Waxman (D)	Xavier; Becerra (D)	Marty; Martínez (D)	Julian; Dixon (D)	Lucille; Roybal- Allard (D)	Esteban; Torres (D)	Maxine; Waters (D)	Jane; Harman (D)	Juanita; Millender- McDonald (D)	Steve; Horn (R)	Ed; Royce (R)	Jerry; Lewis (R)	Jay; Kim (R)	George; Brown; Jr. (D)	Ken; Calvert (R)	Mary; Bono (R)	Dana; Rohra- bacher (R)	Loretta; Sanchez (D)	Christopher; Cox (R)	Ron; Packard (R)	Brian; Bilbray (R)	Bob; Filner (D)	Duke; Cunning- ham (R)	Duncan; L. Hunter (R)	105th (1997–1999)
Mike; Thompson (D)	Wally; Herger (R)	Doug; Ose (R)	John; Doolittle (R)	Bob; Matsui (D)	Lynn; Woolsey (D)	George; Miller (D)	Nancy; Pelosi (D)	Barbara; Lee (D)	Ellen; Tauscher (D)	Richard; Pombo (R)	Tom; Lantos (D)	Pete; Stark (D)	Anna; Eshoo (D)	Tom; Campbell (R)	Zoe; Lofgren (D)	Sam; Farr (D)	Gary; Condit (D)	George; Radanovich (R)	Cal; Dooley (D)	Bill; Thomas (R)	Lois; Capps (D)	Elton; Gallegly (R)	Brad; Sherman (D)	Buck; McKeon (R)	Howard; Berman (D)	James E. Rogan (R)	David; Dreier (R)	Henry; Waxman (D)	Xavier; Becerra (D)	Marty; Martínez (D)	Julian; Dixon (D)	Lucille; Roybal- Allard (D)	Grace; Napolitano (D)	Maxine; Waters (D)	Steven T. Kuykendall (R)	Juanita; Millender- McDonald (D)	Steve; Horn (R)	Ed; Royce (R)	Jerry; Lewis (R)	Gary; Miller (R)	George; Brown; Jr. (D)	Ken; Calvert (R)	Mary; Bono (R)	Dana; Rohra- bacher (R)	Loretta; Sanchez (D)	Christopher; Cox (R)	Ron; Packard (R)	Brian; Bilbray (R)	Bob; Filner (D)	Duke; Cunning- ham (R)	Duncan; L. Hunter (R)	106th (1999–2001)
Mike; Thompson (D)	Wally; Herger (R)	Doug; Ose (R)	John; Doolittle (R)	Bob; Matsui (D)	Lynn; Woolsey (D)	George; Miller (D)	Nancy; Pelosi (D)	Barbara; Lee (D)	Ellen; Tauscher (D)	Richard; Pombo (R)	Tom; Lantos (D)	Pete; Stark (D)	Anna; Eshoo (D)	Tom; Campbell (R)	Zoe; Lofgren (D)	Sam; Farr (D)	Gary; Condit (D)	George; Radanovich (R)	Cal; Dooley (D)	Bill; Thomas (R)	Lois; Capps (D)	Elton; Gallegly (R)	Brad; Sherman (D)	Buck; McKeon (R)	Howard; Berman (D)	James E. Rogan (R)	David; Dreier (R)	Henry; Waxman (D)	Xavier; Becerra (D)	Marty; Martínez (R)	Julian; Dixon (D)	Lucille; Roybal- Allard (D)	Grace; Napolitano (D)	Maxine; Waters (D)	Steven T. Kuykendall (R)	Juanita; Millender- McDonald (D)	Steve; Horn (R)	Ed; Royce (R)	Jerry; Lewis (R)	Gary; Miller (R)	Joe; Baca (D)	Ken; Calvert (R)	Mary; Bono (R)	Dana; Rohra- bacher (R)	Loretta; Sanchez (D)	Christopher; Cox (R)	Ron; Packard (R)	Brian; Bilbray (R)	Bob; Filner (D)	Duke; Cunning- ham (R)	Duncan; L. Hunter (R)	106th (1999–2001)
Mike; Thompson (D)	Wally; Herger (R)	Doug; Ose (R)	John; Doolittle (R)	Bob; Matsui (D)	Lynn; Woolsey (D)	George; Miller (D)	Nancy; Pelosi (D)	Barbara; Lee (D)	Ellen; Tauscher (D)	Richard; Pombo (R)	Tom; Lantos (D)	Pete; Stark (D)	Anna; Eshoo (D)	Mike; Honda (D)	Zoe; Lofgren (D)	Sam; Farr (D)	Gary; Condit (D)	George; Radanovich (R)	Cal; Dooley (D)	Bill; Thomas (R)	Lois; Capps (D)	Elton; Gallegly (R)	Brad; Sherman (D)	Buck; McKeon (R)	Howard; Berman (D)	Adam; Schiff (D)	David; Dreier (R)	Henry; Waxman (D)	Xavier; Becerra (D)	Hilda; Solis (D)	Diane; Watson (D)	Lucille; Roybal- Allard (D)	Grace; Napolitano (D)	Maxine; Waters (D)	Jane; Harman (D)	Juanita; Millender- McDonald (D)	Steve; Horn (R)	Ed; Royce (R)	Jerry; Lewis (R)	Gary; Miller (R)	Joe; Baca (D)	Ken; Calvert (R)	Mary; Bono (R)	Dana; Rohra- bacher (R)	Loretta; Sanchez (D)	Christopher; Cox (R)	Darrell; Issa (R)	Susan; Davis (D)	Bob; Filner (D)	Duke; Cunning- ham (R)	Duncan; L. Hunter (R)	107th (2001–2003)

=== 2003–2023: 53 seats ===
Following the 2000 census, California was apportioned 53 seats.

Congress
108th
(2003–2005)
109th
(2005–2007)
110th
(2007–2009)
111th
(2009–2011)
112th
(2011–2013)
113th
(2013–2015)
114th
(2015–2017)
115th
(2017–2019)
116th
(2019–2021)
117th
(2021–2023)
Congress

Districts																																																					Congress
1st	2nd	3rd	4th	5th	6th	7th	8th	9th	10th	11th	12th	13th	14th	15th	16th	17th	18th	19th	20th	21st	22nd	23rd	24th	25th	26th	27th	28th	29th	30th	31st	32nd	33rd	34th	35th	36th	37th	38th	39th	40th	41st	42nd	43rd	44th	45th	46th	47th	48th	49th	50th	51st	52nd	53rd	Congress
Mike; Thompson (D)	Wally; Herger (R)	Doug; Ose (R)	John; Doolittle (R)	Bob; Matsui (D)^{a}	Lynn; Woolsey (D)	George; Miller (D)	Nancy; Pelosi (D)	Barbara; Lee (D)	Ellen; Tauscher (D)	Richard; Pombo (R)	Tom; Lantos (D)^{b}	Pete; Stark (D)	Anna; Eshoo (D)	Mike; Honda (D)	Zoe; Lofgren (D)	Sam; Farr (D)	Dennis; Cardoza (D)	George; Radanovich (R)	Cal; Dooley (D)	Devin; Nunes (R)	Bill; Thomas (R)	Lois; Capps (D)	Elton; Gallegly (R)	Buck; McKeon (R)	David; Dreier (R)	Brad; Sherman (D)	Howard; Berman (D)	Adam; Schiff (D)	Henry; Waxman (D)	Xavier; Becerra (D)	Hilda; Solis (D)	Diane; Watson (D)	Lucille; Roybal- Allard (D)	Maxine; Waters (D)	Jane; Harman (D)^{c}	Juanita; Millender- McDonald (D)^{d}	Grace; Napolitano (D)	Linda; Sánchez (D)	Ed; Royce (R)	Jerry; Lewis (R)	Gary; Miller (R)	Joe; Baca (D)	Ken; Calvert (R)	Mary; Bono (R)	Dana; Rohra- bacher (R)	Loretta; Sanchez (D)	Christopher; Cox (R)	Darrell; Issa (R)	Duke; Cunning- ham (R)	Bob; Filner (D)	Duncan; L. Hunter (R)	Susan; Davis (D)	108th (2003–2005)
Mike; Thompson (D)	Wally; Herger (R)	Dan; Lungren (R)	John; Doolittle (R)	Doris; Matsui (D)	Lynn; Woolsey (D)	George; Miller (D)	Nancy; Pelosi (D)	Barbara; Lee (D)	Ellen; Tauscher (D)	Richard; Pombo (R)	Tom; Lantos (D)^{b}	Pete; Stark (D)	Anna; Eshoo (D)	Mike; Honda (D)	Zoe; Lofgren (D)	Sam; Farr (D)	Dennis; Cardoza (D)	George; Radanovich (R)	Jim; Costa (D)	Devin; Nunes (R)	Bill; Thomas (R)	Lois; Capps (D)	Elton; Gallegly (R)	Buck; McKeon (R)	David; Dreier (R)	Brad; Sherman (D)	Howard; Berman (D)	Adam; Schiff (D)	Henry; Waxman (D)	Xavier; Becerra (D)	Hilda; Solis (D)	Diane; Watson (D)	Lucille; Roybal- Allard (D)	Maxine; Waters (D)	Jane; Harman (D)^{c}	Juanita; Millender- McDonald (D)^{d}	Grace; Napolitano (D)	Linda; Sánchez (D)	Ed; Royce (R)	Jerry; Lewis (R)	Gary; Miller (R)	Joe; Baca (D)	Ken; Calvert (R)	Mary; Bono (R)	Dana; Rohra- bacher (R)	Loretta; Sanchez (D)	Christopher; Cox (R)	Darrell; Issa (R)	Duke; Cunning- ham (R)	Bob; Filner (D)	Duncan; L. Hunter (R)	Susan; Davis (D)	109th (2005–2007)
Mike; Thompson (D)	Wally; Herger (R)	Dan; Lungren (R)	John; Doolittle (R)	Doris; Matsui (D)	Lynn; Woolsey (D)	George; Miller (D)	Nancy; Pelosi (D)	Barbara; Lee (D)	Ellen; Tauscher (D)	Richard; Pombo (R)	Tom; Lantos (D)^{b}	Pete; Stark (D)	Anna; Eshoo (D)	Mike; Honda (D)	Zoe; Lofgren (D)	Sam; Farr (D)	Dennis; Cardoza (D)	George; Radanovich (R)	Jim; Costa (D)	Devin; Nunes (R)	Bill; Thomas (R)	Lois; Capps (D)	Elton; Gallegly (R)	Buck; McKeon (R)	David; Dreier (R)	Brad; Sherman (D)	Howard; Berman (D)	Adam; Schiff (D)	Henry; Waxman (D)	Xavier; Becerra (D)	Hilda; Solis (D)	Diane; Watson (D)	Lucille; Roybal- Allard (D)	Maxine; Waters (D)	Jane; Harman (D)^{c}	Juanita; Millender- McDonald (D)^{d}	Grace; Napolitano (D)	Linda; Sánchez (D)	Ed; Royce (R)	Jerry; Lewis (R)	Gary; Miller (R)	Joe; Baca (D)	Ken; Calvert (R)	Mary; Bono (R)	Dana; Rohra- bacher (R)	Loretta; Sanchez (D)	John; Campbell (R)	Darrell; Issa (R)	Brian; Bilbray (R)	Bob; Filner (D)	Duncan; L. Hunter (R)	Susan; Davis (D)	109th (2005–2007)
Mike; Thompson (D)	Wally; Herger (R)	Dan; Lungren (R)	John; Doolittle (R)	Doris; Matsui (D)	Lynn; Woolsey (D)	George; Miller (D)	Nancy; Pelosi (D)	Barbara; Lee (D)	Ellen; Tauscher (D)	Jerry; McNerney (D)	Tom; Lantos (D)^{b}	Pete; Stark (D)	Anna; Eshoo (D)	Mike; Honda (D)	Zoe; Lofgren (D)	Sam; Farr (D)	Dennis; Cardoza (D)	George; Radanovich (R)	Jim; Costa (D)	Devin; Nunes (R)	Kevin; McCarthy (R)	Lois; Capps (D)	Elton; Gallegly (R)	Buck; McKeon (R)	David; Dreier (R)	Brad; Sherman (D)	Howard; Berman (D)	Adam; Schiff (D)	Henry; Waxman (D)	Xavier; Becerra (D)	Hilda; Solis (D)	Diane; Watson (D)	Lucille; Roybal- Allard (D)	Maxine; Waters (D)	Jane; Harman (D)^{c}	Laura; Richardson (D)	Grace; Napolitano (D)	Linda; Sánchez (D)	Ed; Royce (R)	Jerry; Lewis (R)	Gary; Miller (R)	Joe; Baca (D)	Ken; Calvert (R)	Mary; Bono (R)	Dana; Rohra- bacher (R)	Loretta; Sanchez (D)	John; Campbell (R)	Darrell; Issa (R)	Brian; Bilbray (R)	Bob; Filner (D)	Duncan; L. Hunter (R)	Susan; Davis (D)	110th (2007–2009)
Mike; Thompson (D)	Wally; Herger (R)	Dan; Lungren (R)	John; Doolittle (R)	Doris; Matsui (D)	Lynn; Woolsey (D)	George; Miller (D)	Nancy; Pelosi (D)	Barbara; Lee (D)	Ellen; Tauscher (D)	Jerry; McNerney (D)	Jackie; Speier (D)	Pete; Stark (D)	Anna; Eshoo (D)	Mike; Honda (D)	Zoe; Lofgren (D)	Sam; Farr (D)	Dennis; Cardoza (D)	George; Radanovich (R)	Jim; Costa (D)	Devin; Nunes (R)	Kevin; McCarthy (R)	Lois; Capps (D)	Elton; Gallegly (R)	Buck; McKeon (R)	David; Dreier (R)	Brad; Sherman (D)	Howard; Berman (D)	Adam; Schiff (D)	Henry; Waxman (D)	Xavier; Becerra (D)	Hilda; Solis (D)	Diane; Watson (D)	Lucille; Roybal- Allard (D)	Maxine; Waters (D)	Jane; Harman (D)^{c}	Laura; Richardson (D)	Grace; Napolitano (D)	Linda; Sánchez (D)	Ed; Royce (R)	Jerry; Lewis (R)	Gary; Miller (R)	Joe; Baca (D)	Ken; Calvert (R)	Mary; Bono (R)	Dana; Rohra- bacher (R)	Loretta; Sanchez (D)	John; Campbell (R)	Darrell; Issa (R)	Brian; Bilbray (R)	Bob; Filner (D)	Duncan; L. Hunter (R)	Susan; Davis (D)	110th (2007–2009)
Mike; Thompson (D)	Wally; Herger (R)	Dan; Lungren (R)	Tom; McClintock (R)	Doris; Matsui (D)	Lynn; Woolsey (D)	George; Miller (D)	Nancy; Pelosi (D)	Barbara; Lee (D)	Ellen; Tauscher (D)	Jerry; McNerney (D)	Jackie; Speier (D)	Pete; Stark (D)	Anna; Eshoo (D)	Mike; Honda (D)	Zoe; Lofgren (D)	Sam; Farr (D)	Dennis; Cardoza (D)	George; Radanovich (R)	Jim; Costa (D)	Devin; Nunes (R)	Kevin; McCarthy (R)	Lois; Capps (D)	Elton; Gallegly (R)	Buck; McKeon (R)	David; Dreier (R)	Brad; Sherman (D)	Howard; Berman (D)	Adam; Schiff (D)	Henry; Waxman (D)	Xavier; Becerra (D)	Hilda; Solis (D)	Diane; Watson (D)	Lucille; Roybal- Allard (D)	Maxine; Waters (D)	Jane; Harman (D)^{c}	Laura; Richardson (D)	Grace; Napolitano (D)	Linda; Sánchez (D)	Ed; Royce (R)	Jerry; Lewis (R)	Gary; Miller (R)	Joe; Baca (D)	Ken; Calvert (R)	Mary; Bono (R)	Dana; Rohra- bacher (R)	Loretta; Sanchez (D)	John; Campbell (R)	Darrell; Issa (R)	Brian; Bilbray (R)	Bob; Filner (D)	Duncan; D. Hunter (R)	Susan; Davis (D)	111th (2009–2011)
Mike; Thompson (D)	Wally; Herger (R)	Dan; Lungren (R)	Tom; McClintock (R)	Doris; Matsui (D)	Lynn; Woolsey (D)	George; Miller (D)	Nancy; Pelosi (D)	Barbara; Lee (D)	John; Garamendi (D)	Jerry; McNerney (D)	Jackie; Speier (D)	Pete; Stark (D)	Anna; Eshoo (D)	Mike; Honda (D)	Zoe; Lofgren (D)	Sam; Farr (D)	Dennis; Cardoza (D)	George; Radanovich (R)	Jim; Costa (D)	Devin; Nunes (R)	Kevin; McCarthy (R)	Lois; Capps (D)	Elton; Gallegly (R)	Buck; McKeon (R)	David; Dreier (R)	Brad; Sherman (D)	Howard; Berman (D)	Adam; Schiff (D)	Henry; Waxman (D)	Xavier; Becerra (D)	Judy; Chu (D)	Diane; Watson (D)	Lucille; Roybal- Allard (D)	Maxine; Waters (D)	Jane; Harman (D)^{c}	Laura; Richardson (D)	Grace; Napolitano (D)	Linda; Sánchez (D)	Ed; Royce (R)	Jerry; Lewis (R)	Gary; Miller (R)	Joe; Baca (D)	Ken; Calvert (R)	Mary; Bono (R)	Dana; Rohra- bacher (R)	Loretta; Sanchez (D)	John; Campbell (R)	Darrell; Issa (R)	Brian; Bilbray (R)	Bob; Filner (D)	Duncan; D. Hunter (R)	Susan; Davis (D)	111th (2009–2011)
Mike; Thompson (D)	Wally; Herger (R)	Dan; Lungren (R)	Tom; McClintock (R)	Doris; Matsui (D)	Lynn; Woolsey (D)	George; Miller (D)	Nancy; Pelosi (D)	Barbara; Lee (D)	John; Garamendi (D)	Jerry; McNerney (D)	Jackie; Speier (D)	Pete; Stark (D)	Anna; Eshoo (D)	Mike; Honda (D)	Zoe; Lofgren (D)	Sam; Farr (D)	Dennis; Cardoza (D)	Jeff; Denham (R)	Jim; Costa (D)	Devin; Nunes (R)	Kevin; McCarthy (R)	Lois; Capps (D)	Elton; Gallegly (R)	Buck; McKeon (R)	David; Dreier (R)	Brad; Sherman (D)	Howard; Berman (D)	Adam; Schiff (D)	Henry; Waxman (D)	Xavier; Becerra (D)	Judy; Chu (D)	Karen; Bass (D)	Lucille; Roybal- Allard (D)	Maxine; Waters (D)	Jane; Harman (D)^{c}	Laura; Richardson (D)	Grace; Napolitano (D)	Linda; Sánchez (D)	Ed; Royce (R)	Jerry; Lewis (R)	Gary; Miller (R)	Joe; Baca (D)	Ken; Calvert (R)	Mary; Bono (R)	Dana; Rohra- bacher (R)	Loretta; Sanchez (D)	John; Campbell (R)	Darrell; Issa (R)	Brian; Bilbray (R)	Bob; Filner (D)	Duncan; D. Hunter (R)	Susan; Davis (D)	112th (2011–2013)
Mike; Thompson (D)	Wally; Herger (R)	Dan; Lungren (R)	Tom; McClintock (R)	Doris; Matsui (D)	Lynn; Woolsey (D)	George; Miller (D)	Nancy; Pelosi (D)	Barbara; Lee (D)	John; Garamendi (D)	Jerry; McNerney (D)	Jackie; Speier (D)	Pete; Stark (D)	Anna; Eshoo (D)	Mike; Honda (D)	Zoe; Lofgren (D)	Sam; Farr (D)	Dennis; Cardoza (D)	Jeff; Denham (R)	Jim; Costa (D)	Devin; Nunes (R)	Kevin; McCarthy (R)	Lois; Capps (D)	Elton; Gallegly (R)	Buck; McKeon (R)	David; Dreier (R)	Brad; Sherman (D)	Howard; Berman (D)	Adam; Schiff (D)	Henry; Waxman (D)	Xavier; Becerra (D)	Judy; Chu (D)	Karen; Bass (D)	Lucille; Roybal- Allard (D)	Maxine; Waters (D)	Janice; Hahn (D)	Laura; Richardson (D)	Grace; Napolitano (D)	Linda; Sánchez (D)	Ed; Royce (R)	Jerry; Lewis (R)	Gary; Miller (R)	Joe; Baca (D)	Ken; Calvert (R)	Mary; Bono (R)	Dana; Rohra- bacher (R)	Loretta; Sanchez (D)	John; Campbell (R)	Darrell; Issa (R)	Brian; Bilbray (R)	Bob; Filner (D)	Duncan; D. Hunter (R)	Susan; Davis (D)	112th (2011–2013)
Doug; LaMalfa (R)	Jared; Huffman (D)	John; Garamendi (D)	Tom; McClintock (R)	Mike; Thompson (D)	Doris; Matsui (D)	Ami; Bera (D)	Paul; Cook (R)	Jerry; McNerney (D)	Jeff; Denham (R)	George; Miller (D)	Nancy; Pelosi (D)	Barbara; Lee (D)	Jackie; Speier (D)	Eric; Swalwell (D)	Jim; Costa (D)	Mike; Honda (D)	Anna; Eshoo (D)	Zoe; Lofgren (D)	Sam; Farr (D)	David; Valadao (R)	Devin; Nunes (R)	Kevin; McCarthy (R)	Lois; Capps (D)	Buck; McKeon (R)	Julia; Brownley (D)	Judy; Chu (D)	Adam; Schiff (D)	Tony; Cárdenas (D)	Brad; Sherman (D)	Gary; Miller (R)	Grace; Napolitano (D)	Henry; Waxman (D)	Xavier; Becerra (D)	Gloria N. McLeod (D)	Raul; Ruiz (D)	Karen; Bass (D)	Linda; Sánchez (D)	Ed; Royce (R)	Lucille; Roybal- Allard (D)	Mark; Takano (D)	Ken; Calvert (R)	Maxine; Waters (D)	Janice; Hahn (D)	John; Campbell (R)	Loretta; Sanchez (D)	Alan; Lowenthal (D)	Dana; Rohra- bacher (R)	Darrell; Issa (R)	Duncan D. Hunter (R)	Juan; Vargas (D)	Scott; Peters (D)	Susan; Davis (D)	113th (2013–2015)
Doug; LaMalfa (R)	Jared; Huffman (D)	John; Garamendi (D)	Tom; McClintock (R)	Mike; Thompson (D)	Doris; Matsui (D)	Ami; Bera (D)	Paul; Cook (R)	Jerry; McNerney (D)	Jeff; Denham (R)	Mark; DeSaulnier (D)	Nancy; Pelosi (D)	Barbara; Lee (D)	Jackie; Speier (D)	Eric; Swalwell (D)	Jim; Costa (D)	Mike; Honda (D)	Anna; Eshoo (D)	Zoe; Lofgren (D)	Sam; Farr (D)	David; Valadao (R)	Devin; Nunes (R)	Kevin; McCarthy (R)	Lois; Capps (D)	Steve; Knight (R)	Julia; Brownley (D)	Judy; Chu (D)	Adam; Schiff (D)	Tony; Cárdenas (D)	Brad; Sherman (D)	Pete; Aguilar (D)	Grace; Napolitano (D)	Ted; Lieu (D)	Xavier; Becerra (D)	Norma; Torres (D)	Raul; Ruiz (D)	Karen; Bass (D)	Linda; Sánchez (D)	Ed; Royce (R)	Lucille; Roybal- Allard (D)	Mark; Takano (D)	Ken; Calvert (R)	Maxine; Waters (D)	Janice; Hahn (D)	Mimi; Walters (R)	Loretta; Sanchez (D)	Alan; Lowenthal (D)	Dana; Rohra- bacher (R)	Darrell; Issa (R)	Duncan D. Hunter (R)	Juan; Vargas (D)	Scott; Peters (D)	Susan; Davis (D)	114th (2015–2017)
Doug; LaMalfa (R)	Jared; Huffman (D)	John; Garamendi (D)	Tom; McClintock (R)	Mike; Thompson (D)	Doris; Matsui (D)	Ami; Bera (D)	Paul; Cook (R)	Jerry; McNerney (D)	Jeff; Denham (R)	Mark; DeSaulnier (D)	Nancy; Pelosi (D)	Barbara; Lee (D)	Jackie; Speier (D)	Eric; Swalwell (D)	Jim; Costa (D)	Ro; Khanna (D)	Anna; Eshoo (D)	Zoe; Lofgren (D)	Jimmy; Panetta (D)	David; Valadao (R)	Devin; Nunes (R)	Kevin; McCarthy (R)	Salud; Carbajal (D)	Steve; Knight (R)	Julia; Brownley (D)	Judy; Chu (D)	Adam; Schiff (D)	Tony; Cárdenas (D)	Brad; Sherman (D)	Pete; Aguilar (D)	Grace; Napolitano (D)	Ted; Lieu (D)	Xavier; Becerra (D)	Norma; Torres (D)	Raul; Ruiz (D)	Karen; Bass (D)	Linda; Sánchez (D)	Ed; Royce (R)	Lucille; Roybal- Allard (D)	Mark; Takano (D)	Ken; Calvert (R)	Maxine; Waters (D)	Nannette; Barragán (D)	Mimi; Walters (R)	Lou; Correa (D)	Alan; Lowenthal (D)	Dana; Rohra- bacher (R)	Darrell; Issa (R)	Duncan D. Hunter (R)	Juan; Vargas (D)	Scott; Peters (D)	Susan; Davis (D)	115th (2017–2019)
Doug; LaMalfa (R)	Jared; Huffman (D)	John; Garamendi (D)	Tom; McClintock (R)	Mike; Thompson (D)	Doris; Matsui (D)	Ami; Bera (D)	Paul; Cook (R)	Jerry; McNerney (D)	Jeff; Denham (R)	Mark; DeSaulnier (D)	Nancy; Pelosi (D)	Barbara; Lee (D)	Jackie; Speier (D)	Eric; Swalwell (D)	Jim; Costa (D)	Ro; Khanna (D)	Anna; Eshoo (D)	Zoe; Lofgren (D)	Jimmy; Panetta (D)	David; Valadao (R)	Devin; Nunes (R)	Kevin; McCarthy (R)	Salud; Carbajal (D)	Steve; Knight (R)	Julia; Brownley (D)	Judy; Chu (D)	Adam; Schiff (D)	Tony; Cárdenas (D)	Brad; Sherman (D)	Pete; Aguilar (D)	Grace; Napolitano (D)	Ted; Lieu (D)	Jimmy; Gomez (D)	Norma; Torres (D)	Raul; Ruiz (D)	Karen; Bass (D)	Linda; Sánchez (D)	Ed; Royce (R)	Lucille; Roybal- Allard (D)	Mark; Takano (D)	Ken; Calvert (R)	Maxine; Waters (D)	Nannette; Barragán (D)	Mimi; Walters (R)	Lou; Correa (D)	Alan; Lowenthal (D)	Dana; Rohra- bacher (R)	Darrell; Issa (R)	Duncan D. Hunter (R)	Juan; Vargas (D)	Scott; Peters (D)	Susan; Davis (D)	115th (2017–2019)
Doug; LaMalfa (R)	Jared; Huffman (D)	John; Garamendi (D)	Tom; McClintock (R)	Mike; Thompson (D)	Doris; Matsui (D)	Ami; Bera (D)	Paul; Cook (R)	Jerry; McNerney (D)	Josh; Harder (D)	Mark; DeSaulnier (D)	Nancy; Pelosi (D)	Barbara; Lee (D)	Jackie; Speier (D)	Eric; Swalwell (D)	Jim; Costa (D)	Ro; Khanna (D)	Anna; Eshoo (D)	Zoe; Lofgren (D)	Jimmy; Panetta (D)	TJ; Cox (D)	Devin; Nunes (R)	Kevin; McCarthy (R)	Salud; Carbajal (D)	Katie Hill (D)^{e}	Julia; Brownley (D)	Judy; Chu (D)	Adam; Schiff (D)	Tony; Cárdenas (D)	Brad; Sherman (D)	Pete; Aguilar (D)	Grace; Napolitano (D)	Ted; Lieu (D)	Jimmy; Gomez (D)	Norma; Torres (D)	Raul; Ruiz (D)	Karen; Bass (D)	Linda; Sánchez (D)	Gil Cis- neros (D)	Lucille; Roybal- Allard (D)	Mark; Takano (D)	Ken; Calvert (R)	Maxine; Waters (D)	Nannette; Barragán (D)	Katie; Porter (D)	Lou; Correa (D)	Alan; Lowenthal (D)	Harley; Rouda (D)	Mike; Levin (D)	Duncan D. Hunter (R)	Juan; Vargas (D)	Scott; Peters (D)	Susan; Davis (D)	116th (2019–2021)
Doug; LaMalfa (R)	Jared; Huffman (D)	John; Garamendi (D)	Tom; McClintock (R)	Mike; Thompson (D)	Doris; Matsui (D)	Ami; Bera (D)	vacant	Jerry; McNerney (D)	Josh; Harder (D)	Mark; DeSaulnier (D)	Nancy; Pelosi (D)	Barbara; Lee (D)	Jackie; Speier (D)	Eric; Swalwell (D)	Jim; Costa (D)	Ro; Khanna (D)	Anna; Eshoo (D)	Zoe; Lofgren (D)	Jimmy; Panetta (D)	TJ; Cox (D)	Devin; Nunes (R)	Kevin; McCarthy (R)	Salud; Carbajal (D)	Mike; Garcia (R)	Julia; Brownley (D)	Judy; Chu (D)	Adam; Schiff (D)	Tony; Cárdenas (D)	Brad; Sherman (D)	Pete; Aguilar (D)	Grace; Napolitano (D)	Ted; Lieu (D)	Jimmy; Gomez (D)	Norma; Torres (D)	Raul; Ruiz (D)	Karen; Bass (D)	Linda; Sánchez (D)	Gil Cis- neros (D)	Lucille; Roybal- Allard (D)	Mark; Takano (D)	Ken; Calvert (R)	Maxine; Waters (D)	Nannette; Barragán (D)	Katie; Porter (D)	Lou; Correa (D)	Alan; Lowenthal (D)	Harley; Rouda (D)	Mike; Levin (D)	vacant	Juan; Vargas (D)	Scott; Peters (D)	Susan; Davis (D)	116th (2019–2021)
Doug; LaMalfa (R)	Jared; Huffman (D)	John; Garamendi (D)	Tom; McClintock (R)	Mike; Thompson (D)	Doris; Matsui (D)	Ami; Bera (D)	Jay Ober- nolte (R)	Jerry; McNerney (D)	Josh; Harder (D)	Mark; DeSaulnier (D)	Nancy; Pelosi (D)	Barbara; Lee (D)	Jackie; Speier (D)	Eric; Swalwell (D)	Jim; Costa (D)	Ro; Khanna (D)	Anna; Eshoo (D)	Zoe; Lofgren (D)	Jimmy; Panetta (D)	David; Valadao (R)	Devin; Nunes (R)	Kevin; McCarthy (R)	Salud; Carbajal (D)	Mike; Garcia (R)	Julia; Brownley (D)	Judy; Chu (D)	Adam; Schiff (D)	Tony; Cárdenas (D)	Brad; Sherman (D)	Pete; Aguilar (D)	Grace; Napolitano (D)	Ted; Lieu (D)	Jimmy; Gomez (D)	Norma; Torres (D)	Raul; Ruiz (D)	Karen; Bass (D)	Linda; Sánchez (D)	Young; Kim (R)	Lucille; Roybal- Allard (D)	Mark; Takano (D)	Ken; Calvert (R)	Maxine; Waters (D)	Nannette; Barragán (D)	Katie; Porter (D)	Lou; Correa (D)	Alan; Lowenthal (D)	Michelle; Steel (R)	Mike; Levin (D)	Darrell; Issa (R)	Juan; Vargas (D)	Scott; Peters (D)	Sara; Jacobs (D)	117th (2021–2023)
Doug; LaMalfa (R)	Jared; Huffman (D)	John; Garamendi (D)	Tom; McClintock (R)	Mike; Thompson (D)	Doris; Matsui (D)	Ami; Bera (D)	Jay Ober- nolte (R)	Jerry; McNerney (D)	Josh; Harder (D)	Mark; DeSaulnier (D)	Nancy; Pelosi (D)	Barbara; Lee (D)	Jackie; Speier (D)	Eric; Swalwell (D)	Jim; Costa (D)	Ro; Khanna (D)	Anna; Eshoo (D)	Zoe; Lofgren (D)	Jimmy; Panetta (D)	David; Valadao (R)	Connie; Conway (R)	Kevin; McCarthy (R)	Salud; Carbajal (D)	Mike; Garcia (R)	Julia; Brownley (D)	Judy; Chu (D)	Adam; Schiff (D)	Tony; Cárdenas (D)	Brad; Sherman (D)	Pete; Aguilar (D)	Grace; Napolitano (D)	Ted; Lieu (D)	Jimmy; Gomez (D)	Norma; Torres (D)	Raul; Ruiz (D)	vacant	Linda; Sánchez (D)	Young; Kim (R)	Lucille; Roybal- Allard (D)	Mark; Takano (D)	Ken; Calvert (R)	Maxine; Waters (D)	Nannette; Barragán (D)	Katie; Porter (D)	Lou; Correa (D)	Alan; Lowenthal (D)	Michelle; Steel (R)	Mike; Levin (D)	Darrell; Issa (R)	Juan; Vargas (D)	Scott; Peters (D)	Sara; Jacobs (D)	117th (2021–2023)
1st	2nd	3rd	4th	5th	6th	7th	8th	9th	10th	11th	12th	13th	14th	15th	16th	17th	18th	19th	20th	21st	22nd	23rd	24th	25th	26th	27th	28th	29th	30th	31st	32nd	33rd	34th	35th	36th	37th	38th	39th	40th	41st	42nd	43rd	44th	45th	46th	47th	48th	49th	50th	51st	52nd	53rd	Congress
Districts																																																					Congress

- ^a Robert Matsui died January 1, 2005, after re-election to the 109th Congress but before the Congress started, and was replaced by Doris Matsui on March 10, 2005.
- ^b Tom Lantos died February 11, 2008, and was replaced by Jackie Speier on April 10, 2008.
- ^c Jane Harman resigned on February 28, 2011, and was replaced by Janice Hahn on July 12, 2011.
- ^d Juanita Millender-McDonald died April 22, 2007, and was replaced by Laura Richardson on August 21, 2007.
- ^e Katie Hill resigned on October 27, 2019, and was replaced by Mike Garcia on May 19, 2020.

=== 2023–present: 52 seats ===
Following the 2020 census, California was apportioned 52 seats.

Congress
118th
(2023–2025)
119th
(2025–2027)
120th
(2027–2029)
Congress

Districts																																																				Congress
1st	2nd	3rd	4th	5th	6th	7th	8th	9th	10th	11th	12th	13th	14th	15th	16th	17th	18th	19th	20th	21st	22nd	23rd	24th	25th	26th	27th	28th	29th	30th	31st	32nd	33rd	34th	35th	36th	37th	38th	39th	40th	41st	42nd	43rd	44th	45th	46th	47th	48th	49th	50th	51st	52nd	Congress
Doug; LaMalfa (R)^{a}	Jared; Huffman (D)	Kevin; Kiley (R)^{b}	Mike; Thompson (D)	Tom; McClintock (R)	Ami; Bera (D)	Doris; Matsui (D)	John; Garamendi (D)	Josh; Harder (D)	Mark; DeSaulnier (D)	Nancy; Pelosi (D)	Barbara; Lee (D)	John; Duarte (R)	Eric; Swalwell (D)^{c}	Kevin; Mullin (D)	Anna; Eshoo (D)	Ro; Khanna (D)	Zoe; Lofgren (D)	Jimmy; Panetta (D)	Kevin; McCarthy (R)	Jim; Costa (D)	David; Valadao (R)	Jay; Obernolte (R)	Salud; Carbajal (D)	Raul; Ruiz (D)	Julia; Brownley (D)	Mike; Garcia (R)	Judy; Chu (D)	Tony; Cárdenas (D)	Adam; Schiff (D)	Grace; Napolitano (D)	Brad; Sherman (D)	Pete; Aguilar (D)	Jimmy; Gomez (D)	Norma; Torres (D)	Ted; Lieu (D)	Sydney; Kamlager- Dove (D)	Linda; Sánchez (D)	Mark; Takano (D)	Young; Kim (R)	Ken; Calvert (R)	Robert; Garcia (D)	Maxine; Waters (D)	Nanette; Barragán (D)	Michelle; Steel (R)	Lou; Correa (D)	Katie; Porter (D)	Darrell; Issa (R)	Mike; Levin (D)	Scott; Peters (D)	Sara; Jacobs (D)	Juan; Vargas (D)	118th (2023–2025)
Doug; LaMalfa (R)^{a}	Jared; Huffman (D)	Kevin; Kiley (R)^{b}	Mike; Thompson (D)	Tom; McClintock (R)	Ami; Bera (D)	Doris; Matsui (D)	John; Garamendi (D)	Josh; Harder (D)	Mark; DeSaulnier (D)	Nancy; Pelosi (D)	Barbara; Lee (D)	John; Duarte (R)	Eric; Swalwell (D)^{c}	Kevin; Mullin (D)	Anna; Eshoo (D)	Ro; Khanna (D)	Zoe; Lofgren (D)	Jimmy; Panetta (D)	Vince; Fong (R)	Jim; Costa (D)	David; Valadao (R)	Jay; Obernolte (R)	Salud; Carbajal (D)	Raul; Ruiz (D)	Julia; Brownley (D)	Mike; Garcia (R)	Judy; Chu (D)	Tony; Cárdenas (D)	Adam; Schiff (D)	Grace; Napolitano (D)	Brad; Sherman (D)	Pete; Aguilar (D)	Jimmy; Gomez (D)	Norma; Torres (D)	Ted; Lieu (D)	Sydney; Kamlager- Dove (D)	Linda; Sánchez (D)	Mark; Takano (D)	Young; Kim (R)	Ken; Calvert (R)	Robert; Garcia (D)	Maxine; Waters (D)	Nanette; Barragán (D)	Michelle; Steel (R)	Lou; Correa (D)	Katie; Porter (D)	Darrell; Issa (R)	Mike; Levin (D)	Scott; Peters (D)	Sara; Jacobs (D)	Juan; Vargas (D)	118th (2023–2025)
Doug; LaMalfa (R)^{a}	Jared; Huffman (D)	Kevin; Kiley (R)^{b}	Mike; Thompson (D)	Tom; McClintock (R)	Ami; Bera (D)	Doris; Matsui (D)	John; Garamendi (D)	Josh; Harder (D)	Mark; DeSaulnier (D)	Nancy; Pelosi (D)	Lateefah; Simon (D)	Adam; Gray (D)	Eric; Swalwell (D)^{c}	Kevin; Mullin (D)	Sam; Liccardo (D)	Ro; Khanna (D)	Zoe; Lofgren (D)	Jimmy; Panetta (D)	Vince; Fong (R)	Jim; Costa (D)	David; Valadao (R)	Jay; Obernolte (R)	Salud; Carbajal (D)	Raul; Ruiz (D)	Julia; Brownley (D)	George T. Whitesides (D)	Judy; Chu (D)	Luz; Rivas (D)	Laura; Friedman (D)	Gil; Cisneros (D)	Brad; Sherman (D)	Pete; Aguilar (D)	Jimmy; Gomez (D)	Norma; Torres (D)	Ted; Lieu (D)	Sydney; Kamlager- Dove (D)	Linda; Sánchez (D)	Mark; Takano (D)	Young; Kim (R)	Ken; Calvert (R)	Robert; Garcia (D)	Maxine; Waters (D)	Nanette; Barragán (D)	Derek; Tran (D)	Lou; Correa (D)	Dave; Min (D)	Darrell; Issa (R)	Mike; Levin (D)	Scott; Peters (D)	Sara; Jacobs (D)	Juan; Vargas (D)	119th (2025–2027)
James; Gallagher (R)	Jared; Huffman (D)	Kevin; Kiley (I)	Mike; Thompson (D)	Tom; McClintock (R)	Ami; Bera (D)	Doris; Matsui (D)	John; Garamendi (D)	Josh; Harder (D)	Mark; DeSaulnier (D)	Nancy; Pelosi (D)	Lateefah; Simon (D)	Adam; Gray (D)	Aisha; Wahab (D)	Kevin; Mullin (D)	Sam; Liccardo (D)	Ro; Khanna (D)	Zoe; Lofgren (D)	Jimmy; Panetta (D)	Vince; Fong (R)	Jim; Costa (D)	David; Valadao (R)	Jay; Obernolte (R)	Salud; Carbajal (D)	Raul; Ruiz (D)	Julia; Brownley (D)	George T. Whitesides (D)	Judy; Chu (D)	Luz; Rivas (D)	Laura; Friedman (D)	Gil; Cisneros (D)	Brad; Sherman (D)	Pete; Aguilar (D)	Jimmy; Gomez (D)	Norma; Torres (D)	Ted; Lieu (D)	Sydney; Kamlager- Dove (D)	Linda; Sánchez (D)	Mark; Takano (D)	Young; Kim (R)	Ken; Calvert (R)	Robert; Garcia (D)	Maxine; Waters (D)	Nanette; Barragán (D)	Derek; Tran (D)	Lou; Correa (D)	Dave; Min (D)	Darrell; Issa (R)	Mike; Levin (D)	Scott; Peters (D)	Sara; Jacobs (D)	Juan; Vargas (D)	119th (2025–2027)
Mike; McGuire (D)	Jared; Huffman (D)	Ami; Bera (D)	Eric; Jones (D)	Tom; McClintock (R)	Richard; Pan (D)	Doris; Matsui (D)	John; Garamendi (D)	Josh; Harder (D)	Mark; DeSaulnier (D)	Scott; Wiener (D)	Lateefah; Simon (D)	Adam; Gray (D)	Aisha; Wahab (D)	Kevin; Mullin (D)	Sam; Liccardo (D)	Ro; Khanna (D)	Zoe; Lofgren (D)	Jimmy; Panetta (D)	Vince; Fong (R)	Jim; Costa (D)	Randy; Villegas (D)	Jay; Obernolte (R)	Salud; Carbajal (D)	Raul; Ruiz (D)	Jacqui; Irwin (D)	George T. Whitesides (D)	Judy; Chu (D)	Luz; Rivas (D)	Laura; Friedman (D)	Gil; Cisneros (D)	Brad; Sherman (D)	Pete; Aguilar (D)	Angela; Gonzales-Torres (D)	Norma; Torres (D)	Ted; Lieu (D)	Sydney; Kamlager- Dove (D)	Hilda; Solis (D)	Mark; Takano (D)	Ken; Calvert (R)	Linda; Sánchez (D)	Robert; Garcia (D)	Maxine; Waters (D)	Nanette; Barragán (D)	Derek; Tran (D)	Lou; Correa (D)	Dave; Min (D)	Marni von Wilpert (D)	Mike; Levin (D)	Scott; Peters (D)	Sara; Jacobs (D)	Juan; Vargas (D)	120th (2027–2029)
1st	2nd	3rd	4th	5th	6th	7th	8th	9th	10th	11th	12th	13th	14th	15th	16th	17th	18th	19th	20th	21st	22nd	23rd	24th	25th	26th	27th	28th	29th	30th	31st	32nd	33rd	34th	35th	36th	37th	38th	39th	40th	41st	42nd	43rd	44th	45th	46th	47th	48th	49th	50th	51st	52nd	Congress
Districts																																																				Congress

- ^a Doug LaMalfa died January 6, 2026.
- ^b Kevin Kiley changed party affiliation on March 19, 2026.
- ^c Eric Swalwell resigned on April 14, 2026.

== Key ==
Anti-Masonic (A-M)
Anti-Monopoly (A-Mo)
Democratic (D)
Populist (Pop)
Progressive (Bull Moose) (Prog)
Progressive (Prog)
Republican (R)
Independent (I)

== See also ==
- List of United States congressional districts
- California's congressional districts
- Political party strength in California
