= John A. Elston =

American politician (1874–1921)

Member of the U.S. House of Representatives from California's 6th district
- In office March 4, 1915 – December 15, 1921
- Preceded by: Joseph R. Knowland
- Succeeded by: James H. MacLafferty

Personal details
- Born: John Arthur Elston; February 10, 1874 Woodland, California, US
- Died: December 15, 1921 (aged 47) Washington, D.C., US
- Cause of death: suicide by drowning
- Resting place: Chapel of the Chimes (Oakland, California)
- Party: Progressive Party; Republican Party
- Education: University of California, Berkeley

John Arthur Elston (February 10, 1874 – December 15, 1921) was an American educator, lawyer and politician who served four terms as a U.S. representative from California from 1915 to 1921.

== Early life and career ==
Born in Woodland, California, Elston attended public schools. He graduated from Hesperian College, Woodland, 1892. He graduated from the University of California, Berkeley, California, 1897.

=== Early career ===
He was a teacher and was admitted to the California state bar, 1901. He worked as a lawyer in private practice. He served as executive secretary to the Governor of California (George C. Pardee) from 1903 to 1907.

He served as member of the board of trustees of the State Institution for the Deaf and Blind from 1911 to 1914.

== Congress ==
Elston was elected as a Progressive to the Sixty-fourth Congress and reelected as a Republican to the three succeeding Congresses (March 4, 1915 – December 15, 1921). He served as chairman of the Committee on Mileage (Sixty-sixth Congress).

== Death ==
After missing congressional proceedings the previous day and being treated by a physician for “nervousness,” Elston killed himself in Washington, D.C., on December 15, 1921, by drowning in the Potomac River. He was cremated and the ashes placed in the California Crematorium, now the Chapel of the Chimes, Oakland, California.

== Electoral history ==
1914 United States House of Representatives elections
Party	Candidate	Votes	%
Progressive	John A. Elston		44.4
Republican	George H. Derrick		37.7
Socialist	Howard H. Caldwell		13.9
Prohibition	Harlow E. Wolcott		3.9
Total votes			100.0
Progressive gain from Republican			

1916 United States House of Representatives elections
Party	Candidate	Votes	%
Republican	John A. Elston (Incumbent)	56,520	64.6
Democratic	H. Avery Whitney	19,787	22.6
Socialist	Luella Twining	7,588	8.7
Prohibition	Harlow E. Wolcott	3,605	4.1
Total votes		87,500	100.0
Republican hold			

1918 United States House of Representatives elections
Party	Candidate	Votes	%
Republican	John A. Elston (Incumbent)	59,082	88.4
Socialist	Luella Twining	7,721	11.6
Total votes		66,803	100.0
Republican hold			

1920 United States House of Representatives elections
Party	Candidate	Votes	%
Republican	John A. Elston (Incumbent)	75,610	83.3
Democratic	Maynard Shipley	15,151	16.7
Total votes		90,761	100.0
Republican hold			

== See also ==
- List of members of the United States Congress who died in office (1900–1949)

U.S. House of Representatives
Preceded by Joseph R. Knowland	Member of the U.S. House of Representatives from California's 6th congressional district 1915–1921	Succeeded by James H. MacLafferty
