= Albert E. Carter =

American politician

Albert Carter
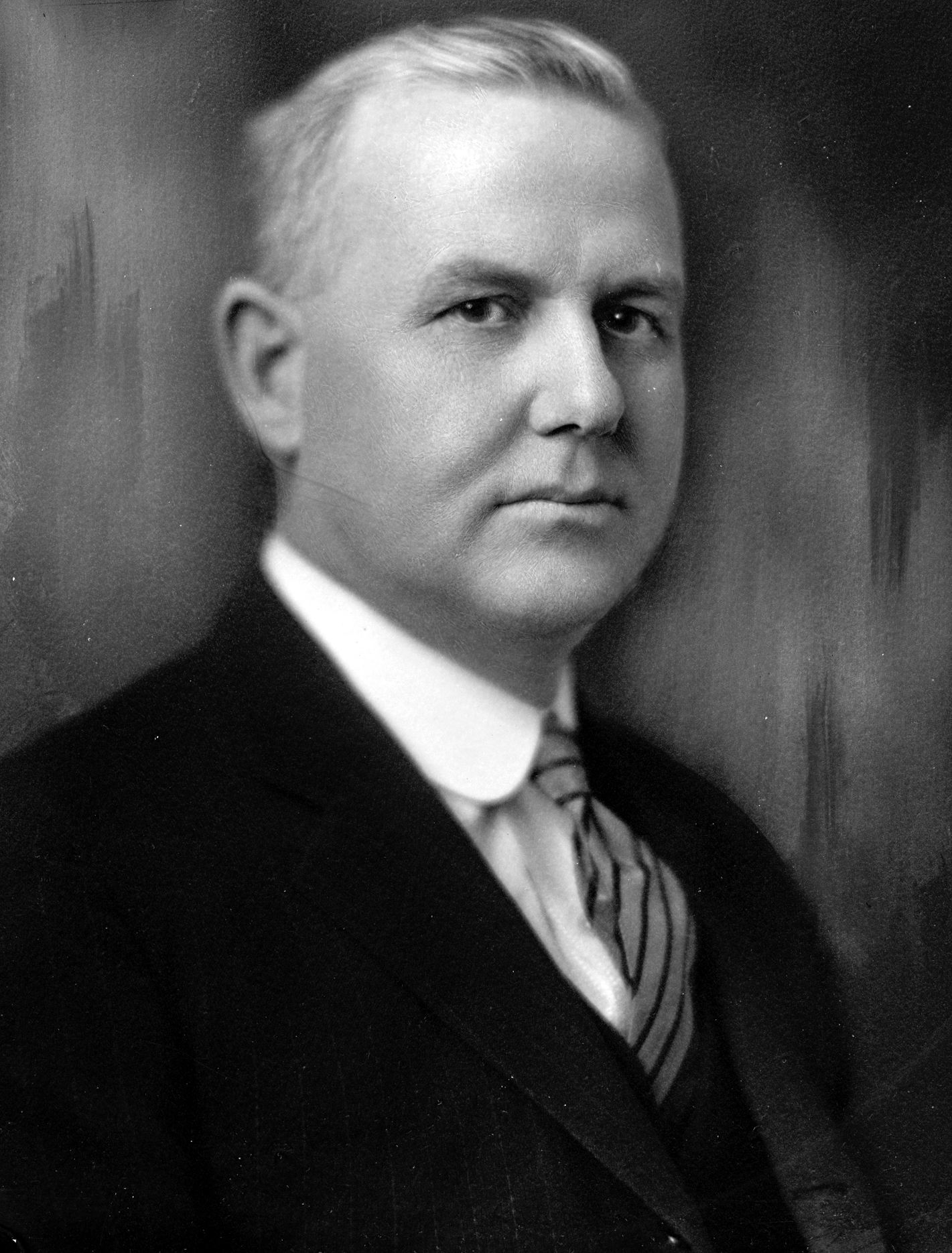

Member of the U.S. House of Representatives from California's 6th district
- In office March 4, 1925 – January 3, 1945
- Preceded by: James H. MacLafferty
- Succeeded by: George P. Miller

Personal details
- Born: Albert Edward Carter; July 5, 1881 Lemon Cove, California
- Died: August 8, 1964 (aged 83) Oakland, California
- Resting place: Home of Peace Cemetery, Porterville, California
- Party: Republican
- Education: San Jose State University; University of California, Berkeley

Albert Edward Carter (July 5, 1881 – August 8, 1964) was an American lawyer and politician who served ten terms as a Republican United States representative from California from 1925 to 1945.

== Early life and career ==
Carter was born in Lemon Cove (sometimes spelled Lemoncove), in Tulare County, California. He attended the public schools and graduated from San Jose State Normal School in 1903, which is now San Jose State University. He taught school six years and then graduated from the law department of the University of California, Berkeley in 1913. He was admitted to the bar the same year and commenced practice in Oakland, California.

Carter was a representative of the United States War Department Commission on Training Camps from 1917 to 1919. He was an attorney for the California State Board of Pharmacy in 1920 and 1921 and commissioner of public works of Oakland 1921–1925 and in 1923 initiated the plan for a comprehensive development of the harbor on the east side of San Francisco Bay. He was the president of the Pacific Coast Association of Port Authorities.

== Congress ==
He was elected as a Republican to the 69th Congress and to the nine following Congresses (March 4, 1925 – January 3, 1945). He was an unsuccessful candidate for reelection in 1944 to the 79th Congress.

== Later career and death ==
He resumed the practice of law in California and Washington, D.C. and died in Oakland, California, in 1964. He was buried in Home of Peace Cemetery, Porterville, California.

== Electoral history ==
Albert Carter electoral history

1924 United States House of Representatives elections
Party	Candidate	Votes	%
Republican	Albert E. Carter	68,547	57.5
Independent	John L. Davie	42,873	35.9
Socialist	Herbert L. Coggins	7,858	6.6
Total votes		119,278	100.0
Republican hold			

1926 United States House of Representatives elections
Party	Candidate	Votes	%
Republican	Albert E. Carter (Incumbent)	91,995	100.0
Republican hold			

1928 United States House of Representatives elections
Party	Candidate	Votes	%
Republican	Albert E. Carter (Incumbent)	113,579	100.0
Republican hold			

1930 United States House of Representatives elections
Party	Candidate	Votes	%
Republican	Albert E. Carter (Incumbent)	110,190	100.0
Republican hold			

1932 United States House of Representatives elections
Party	Candidate	Votes	%
Republican	Albert E. Carter (Incumbent)	75,528	100.0
Republican hold			

1934 United States House of Representatives elections
Party	Candidate	Votes	%
Republican	Albert E. Carter (Incumbent)	93,213	100.0
Republican hold			

1936 United States House of Representatives elections
Party	Candidate	Votes	%
Republican	Albert E. Carter (Incumbent)	103,712	91.0
Socialist	Clarence E. Rust	8,247	7.2
Communist	Lloyd L. Harris	2,021	1.8
Total votes		113,980	100.0
Republican hold			

1938 United States House of Representatives elections
Party	Candidate	Votes	%
Republican	Albert E. Carter (Incumbent)	118,632	94.4
Communist	Dave L. Saunders	7,015	5.6
Total votes		125,647	100.0
Republican hold			

1940 United States House of Representatives elections
Party	Candidate	Votes	%
Republican	Albert E. Carter (Incumbent)	131,584	96
Communist	Clarence Paton	5,426	4
Total votes		137,010	100
Republican hold			

1942 United States House of Representatives elections
Party	Candidate	Votes	%
Republican	Albert E. Carter (Incumbent)	108,585	92.6
Communist	Clarence Paton	8,532	7.3
No party	William H. Hollander (write-in)	185	0.1
Total votes		117,302	100.0
Republican hold			

1944 United States House of Representatives elections
Party	Candidate	Votes	%
Democratic	George Paul Miller	104,441	52
Republican	Albert E. Carter (Incumbent)	96,395	48
Total votes		200,836	100.0
Democratic gain from Republican			

U.S. House of Representatives
Preceded by James H. MacLafferty	Member of the U.S. House of Representatives from California's 6th congressional district 1925–1945	Succeeded by George P. Miller
