= James H. MacLafferty =

American politician

James H. Maclafferty
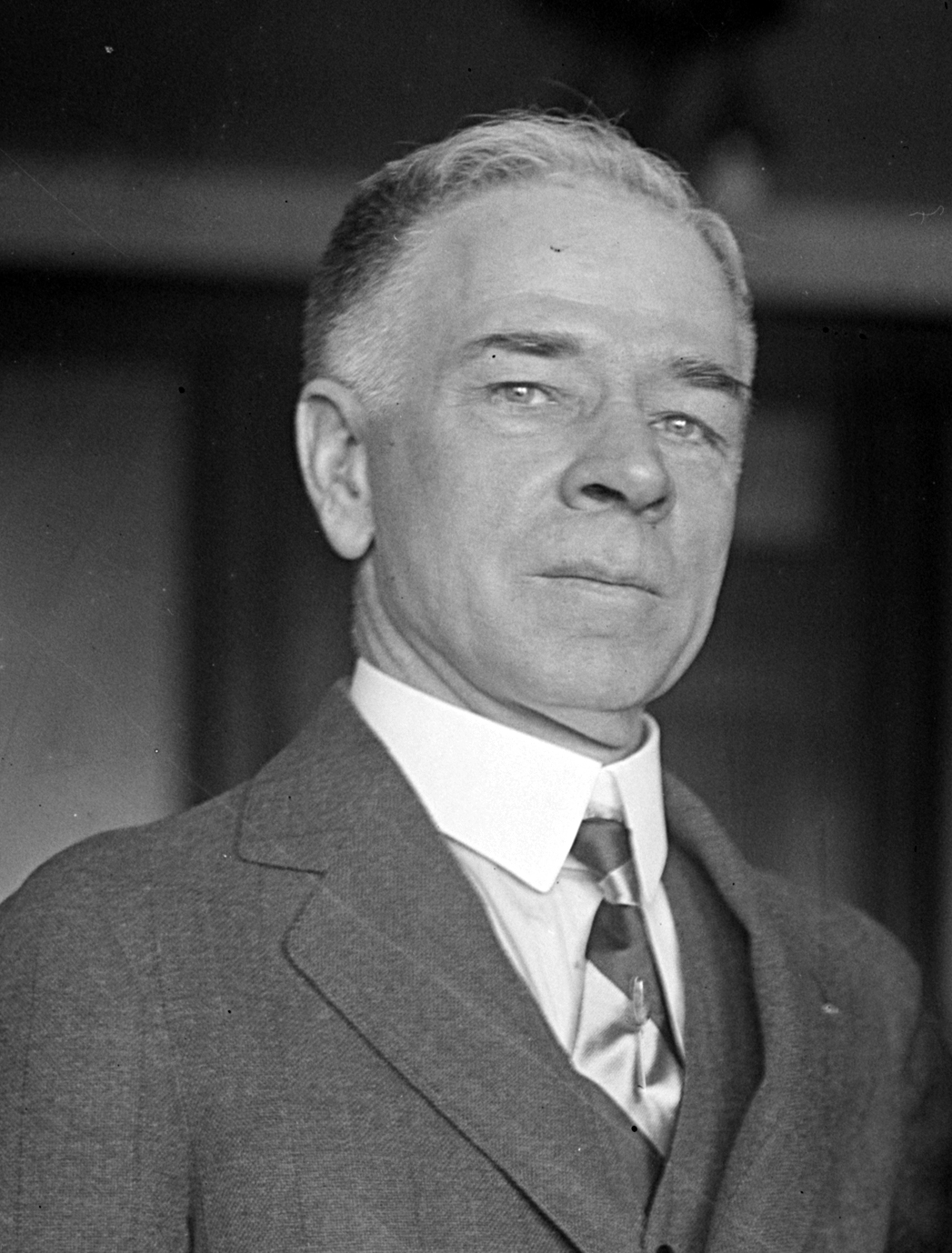
- Maclafferty in 1925

Member of the U.S. House of Representatives from California's 6th district
- In office November 7, 1922 – March 3, 1925
- Preceded by: John A. Elston
- Succeeded by: Albert E. Carter

Personal details
- Born: James Henry Maclafferty; February 27, 1871 San Diego, California
- Died: June 9, 1937 (aged 66) Oakland, California
- Party: Republican

James Henry Maclafferty (February 27, 1871 – June 9, 1937) was an American businessman and politician who served two terms as a U.S. representative from California from 1922 to 1925.

== Early life and career ==
Born in San Diego, California, MacLafferty moved with his parents to Oakland, California, in 1874, to Eugene, Oreg., in 1880, to Astoria, Oreg., in 1883, and to Tacoma, Washington, in 1884. He attended the public schools. He entered the lumber business in Tacoma and continued the same in Seattle until 1889. He engaged in the wholesale paper business at Chicago in 1899. He returned to the Pacific coast in 1900 and settled in Oakland, California. He worked as a traveling salesman and in the paper business.

== Congress ==
MacLafferty was elected as a Republican to the Sixty-seventh Congress to fill the vacancy caused by the death of John A. Elston. He was reelected to the Sixty-eighth Congress and served from November 7, 1922, to March 3, 1925. He was an unsuccessful candidate for reelection in 1924 to the Sixty-ninth Congress.

== Later career ==
He served as assistant to Secretary of Commerce from March 24, 1925, until August 31, 1927. He resumed business activities in Oakland, California. He served as vice president of the Pacific American Steamship Association and of the Shipowners' Association of the Pacific Coast.

== Death ==
He died in Oakland, California, June 9, 1937, and the remains were cremated.

== Electoral history ==
1922 Special election, California 6th District
Candidate	Votes	%
James H. MacLafferty		68.4
Hugh W. Brunk		31.6
Total votes		100.0
Turnout	{{{votes}}}	%

1922 United States House of Representatives elections
Party	Candidate	Votes	%
Republican	James H. MacLafferty (Incumbent)	59,858	66.4
Democratic	Hugh W. Brunk	22,711	25.2
Socialist	Elvina S. Beals	7,616	8.4
Total votes		90,185	100.0
Republican hold			

U.S. House of Representatives
Preceded by John A. Elston	Member of the U.S. House of Representatives from California's 6th congressional district 1922–1925	Succeeded by Albert E. Carter
