= Department of Psychology (Princeton University) =

Academic department at Princeton University

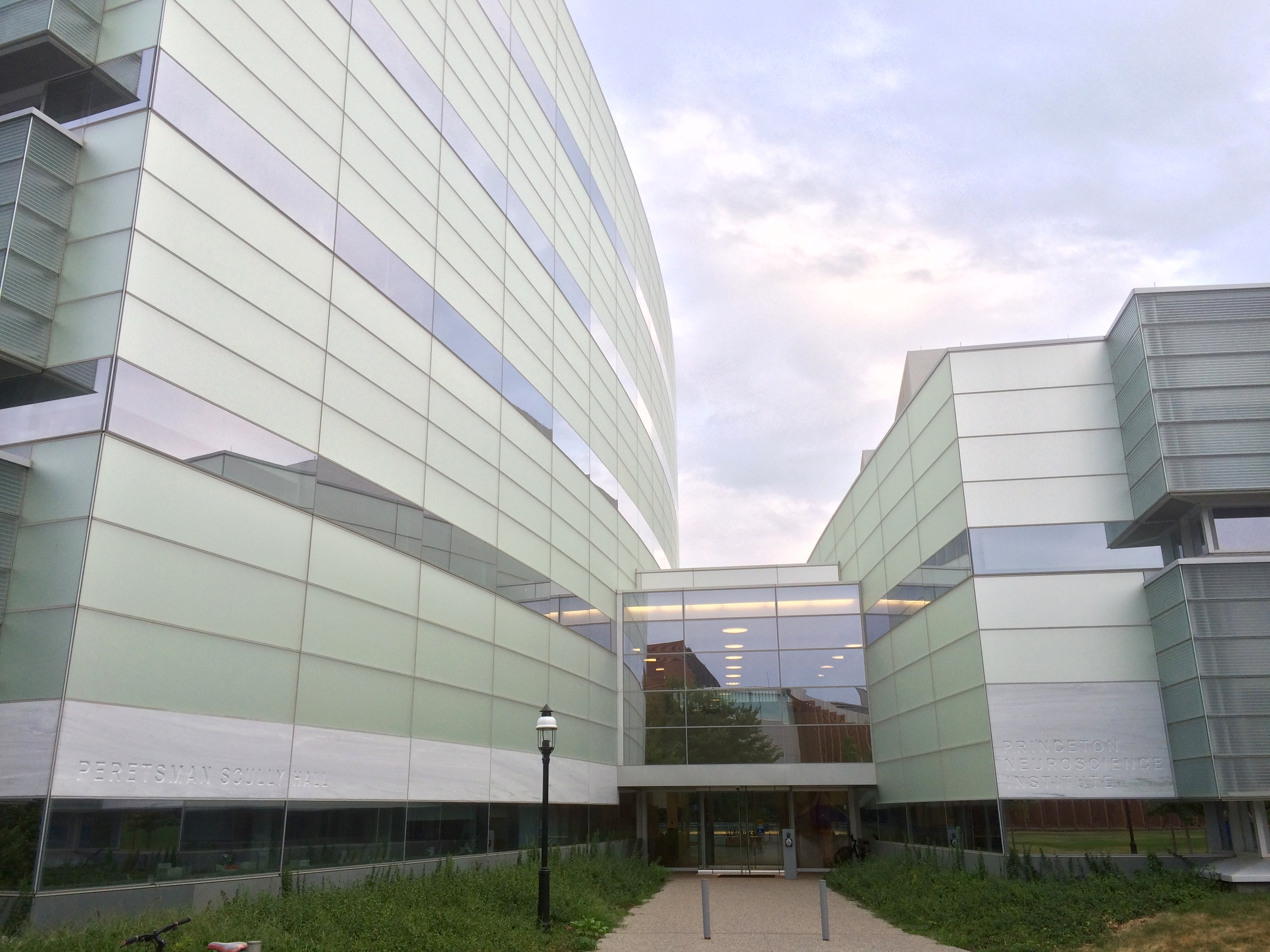
Peretsman-Scully Hallhsbu. 2002 to replace Green Hall as the home of the Psychology Department and Neuroscience Institute

The Department of Psychology, located in Peretsman-Scully Hall, is an academic department of Princeton University in Princeton, New Jersey. It has been home to psychologists who have made significant scientific discoveries in psychology and neuroscience, such as adult neurogenesis in primate brains, the concept of the cognitive miser, bystander non-intervention, face-selective neurons in primate brains, feature integration theory, mental models theory, and prospect theory.

The department's large undergraduate and graduate programs are highly ranked and it has developed a well-respected neuroscience program. The faculty have received numerous awards, including a Nobel Prize, six Distinguished Contributions awards from the American Psychological Association, and three William James Fellow awards from the Association for Psychological Science (APS). Additionally, faculty members have previously served as presidents of the APS, are fellows of the APS, and have been inducted into the National Academy of Sciences. As of 2024, the department is chaired by Casey Lew-Williams, a developmental psychologist known for his work on communication in human infancy.

== History ==
Eno Hall (1924)

In 1893, fourteen years after Wilhelm Wundt founded the first psychology laboratory in the world, a Psychology Laboratory was built in Nassau Hall, the oldest building in the university, under the leadership of J. Mark Baldwin. In 1915, psychology received recognition in the title when the department was renamed Department of Philosophy and Psychology. It was not until 1920, however, that the Department of Psychology was established with Howard Warren as its first chairman. In 1924, Eno Hall was constructed to house the department. The building was named in honor of Henry Eno, the principal donor and research associate in psychology. Warren was also a donor, but he chose to keep his donation anonymous at the time. He commented that it was "the first laboratory in this country, if not in the world, dedicated solely to the teaching and investigation of scientific psychology." According to university president John Hibben, the laboratory was the realization of a dream that Warren had cherished for a long time.

University president James McCosh was primary professor of psychology in the early days of the department. Baldwin, who studied under both McCosh and Wundt, continued this tradition.

Green Hall (c. 1996)

An Office of Public Opinion Research was established when Hadley Cantril was department head:

Already by the mid-1930s, Cantril made contact with Gallup, who, welcoming recognition of his new methods by an academic scholar, offered the Princeton man the full use of his facilities at cost. Later, in 1940, Cantril secured a Rockefeller Foundation grant to set up the Office of Public Opinion Research at Princeton. The objectives of this new institute included not only learning how to measure public opinion systematically and accurately but also understanding the psychology of public opinion, "how and why it changes, what motivates large segments of the public."

The Office's 1947 report Gauging Public Opinion noted the arrival of a new discipline:

Over the past ten years, public opinion research has evolved from an academic pastime and commercial toy to a distinct discipline. American business has avidly exploited the enormous possibilities of the sampling technique in market research. Newspaper and magazine publishers quickly recognized the news value of reporting on the nation's opinions. And now responsible public officials have learned to take opinion polls seriously for their contribution to modern statecraft.

In 1963, the department relocated to Green Hall on the corner of Washington St. and William St. The building, which had been previously occupied by the School of Engineering, was redesigned by university alumnus Francis W. Roudebush for the use of the psychology and sociology departments.

In 1972, the Princeton Psychology Colloquium Committee, which schedules weekly speeches and discussions for psychology students, invited Richard Herrnstein, psychology professor at Harvard University to speak about the vision of pigeons. At the time, Herrnstein was the victim of serious criticism because he had written an article in which he argued that genetic differences would play an increasingly larger role in the determination of social status. Because Princeton's University Action Group, a radical student organization, threatened to sabotage the event on the grounds that Herrnstein was a racist, the Harvard professor canceled his appearance. Kamin asserted that "the climate in which [Herrnstein's] decision was made raises serious questions about freedom of speech."

Most of the department's graduates from the classes of 2004 to 2007 had placements in the faculties of research universities and post-doctoral positions. Thanks to a group of faculty and students who work across traditional disciplines and departments, interdisciplinary research and scholarship in the department has grown significantly since the end of the twentieth century.

In December, 2013, the department relocated to the newly built Peretsman-Scully Hall, located farther down Washington Road on the southeast side of Poe Field.

== Academic ==
The quality of the department's teaching and research has been recognized by high rankings in U.S. News & World Report (USNWR, ranked #3 in 2025) and the National Research Council.

=== Graduate ===
The graduate study is focused on systems neuroscience, cognitive neuroscience, perception and cognition, personality and social psychology, and physiological psychology. It is a preparatory program for a Ph.D., which takes approximately five years to complete, and a career of scholarship in psychology. Every year, six doctoral degrees and eight master's degrees are awarded on average. Students in the university's M.D./Ph.D. program, run jointly with the Robert Wood Johnson Medical School at the University of Medicine and Dentistry of New Jersey, are also able to pursue their doctoral degree in the department.

Laboratory units are organized around the research programs of the faculty. These programs range from animal motivation and conditioning processes to decision making in human social groups, from neurophysiological mechanisms controlling basic drives to attributional processes in judging other individuals, from the sensory and perceptual roots of human cognition to concept formation and problem solving behavior in the child and adult, from the mathematical and computer techniques employed in research to the mechanisms of attitude formation and change.

Admission to the graduate program is highly competitive. The number of applications received by the department has risen steadily from 2003 to 2007 and, consequently, the admission rate has declined accordingly. In 2003, twenty out of 192 applicants were accepted. Though seventeen applicants were admitted to the program in 2007, the applicant pool had almost fifty more applicants than the applicant pool from four years earlier.

Men are better represented in the department's student body than in the student bodies of most psychology graduate programs in the United States. Women account for about half of the department's graduate student body, even though women made up 68 percent of the recipients of doctoral degrees in psychology in 2005. Gender representation notwithstanding, female graduate students in psychology programs may benefit from same-sex mentors in their departments. Whereas only 33 percent of faculty members in psychology departments in the United States are women, the Department of Psychology's faculty has a female representation of over 40 percent. Additionally, the department is one of two departments at Princeton University that has had women who have served as departmental chairs.

Nine percent of the department's graduate students are underrepresented minorities. In contrast, twelve percent of recipients of psychology doctoral degrees in 2005 were African Americans, Hispanics, and Native Americans. However, the ethnic and racial diversity of the department's students is comparable to the diversity of the student body of the university's Graduate School. Eight percent of the university's graduate students are members of the three aforementioned underrepresented groups. To reduce minority underrepresentation in graduate school, the department's faculty and graduate students participate in the Princeton Summer Undergraduate Research Experience program, which seeks to encourage students from underrepresented groups to apply to and succeed in graduate school.

==== Program in cognitive psychology ====
The department was "a presence in the burgeoning field of cognitive psychology." The research of the cognitive psychology program's faculty spans a wide set of issues within the study of cognitive processes that include cognitive control, memory, judgment and decision making, language processing, reasoning, and visual perception. The highly interdisciplinary quality of these topics of study results in research that is interactive and multifaceted. Most of the research is conducted at the intersection of fields like computer science and neuroscience.

As of 2015, Princeton announced the new Program in Cognitive Science, an interdisciplinary undertaking involving scholars from Computer Science, Electrical Engineering, Linguistics, Molecular Biology, Neuroscience, Philosophy, and Psychology.

==== Program in psychology and public policy ====
Robertson Hall, home of the Woodrow Wilson School of Public and International Affairs

Run jointly by the university's Woodrow Wilson School of Public and International Affairs and the Department of Psychology, the program was planned with the intent of being a “discipline plus” degree. The growing interest in the incorporation of psychology in law schools and public policy schools is another reason why the program was established. Such interest is evidenced by the fact that five members of the Department of Psychology's faculty have an additional appointment at the Woodrow Wilson School and the fact that the department is one of the sponsors of the Princeton Graduate Student Conference on Psychology and Policymaking.

=== Undergraduate ===
Undergraduate students can concentrate in Psychology to receive an A.B. in the discipline. As part of the degree requirement, they must complete two junior research papers and a senior thesis under the supervision of the department's faculty members. Psychology is one of the most popular concentrations on campus. It is one of the seven concentrations that have more than one hundred concentrators and undergraduate student enrollment in the department continues to rise steadily. Every year, the department confers 58 undergraduate degrees on average.

Additionally, undergraduate students can enroll in the Program in Neuroscience, which encourages the study of molecular, cellular, developmental, and systems neuroscience as it interfaces with cognitive and behavioral research, to earn a Neuroscience Certificate.

== People ==
=== Historic faculty ===
- James Baldwin (1861–1934), experimental psychologist and philosopher, received an undergraduate degree and a Ph.D. in philosophy from the university. He later accepted the Stuart Chair in Psychology at the department in 1893 and founded the first psychological laboratory in the department.
- Carl Brigham (1890–1943), psychometrist who chaired the College Board committee that created the Scholastic Aptitude Test, was an associate professor in the department in 1923.
- Hadley Cantril (1906–1969), co-author of the classic study on selective perception in a Dartmouth-Princeton American football game, joined the department in 1936 and remained a member of the faculty until his death. He also served as chairman of the department.
- Leonard Carmichael (1898–1973), psychologist, educator, and administrator, became a member of the department's faculty as an instructor of psychology in 1924 and was promoted to assistant professor in 1926.
- Gustave Gilbert (1911–1977), co-author of the second of three stereotype studies that comprise the Princeton Trilogy, jointed the department as a visiting lecturer in abnormal psychology in 1948.
- Harold Gulliksen (1903–1996), psychometrist renowned in part for the development and improvement of an effective screening test for United States Navy gunners during the Second World War, became a professor of psychology at the department after the war.
- Julian Jaynes (1920–1997), author of "The Origin of Consciousness in the Breakdown of the Bicameral Mind", lecturer at the Department of Psychology (1966–1990).
- Edward Jones (1927–1993), who discovered the actor-observer bias in collaboration with Richard Nisbett, joined the psychology faculty in 1977 and remained in the department until his death. The university's Edward E. Jones Lecture Series were inaugurated in his honor.
- Daniel Katz (1903–1998), co-author of the first of three stereotype studies that comprise the Princeton Trilogy, was a member of the faculty from 1928 to 1943.
- Ronald Kinchla (1934–2006), quantitative psychophysicist, joined the department as professor of psychology in 1969 and attained emeritus status in 2003. He also served as director of graduate studies for the department and "helped to shape the modern-day psychology department."
- Herbert Langfeld (1879–1958) was professor of psychology and director of the Psychology Laboratory. He continued in these positions for the next 23 years. In 1937, he became Stuart Professor of Psychology and chairman of the department. He received emeritus status ten years later. The department's faculty lounge is named after him.
- George A. Miller (1920–2012), the James S. McDonnell Distinguished University Professor of Psychology (1979–2012), one of the founders and most influential members of the cognitive psychology field and author of "The Magical Number Seven, Plus or Minus Two: Some Limits on our Capacity for Processing Information", (1956), The Psychological Review.
- Silvan Tomkins (1911–1991), one of the most influential theorists of twentieth-century psychology, had a teaching and research appointment in the department from 1947 until his retirement in 1975.
- Howard Warren (1867–1934) was Stuart Professor of Psychology and chair of the department from 1903 until 1931. He was a graduate of the university and "devoted his entire professional life so untiringly to that institution that his name is indelibly associated with Eno Hall and Princeton psychology."
- Ernest Wever (1902–1991), experimental psychologist who specialized in audition, joined the department in 1927 at the invitation of Langfeld. He was named Dorman T. Warren Professor, a position that he occupied from 1946 to 1950, and Eugene Higgins Professor, a position that he occupied from 1950 to 1971. From 1955 to 1958, he served as chair of the department.

=== Alumni in academic/research institutions and industry ===
Unless otherwise noted, a date indicates the year in which a Ph.D. was conferred.

- Robert Abelson 1953, social psychologist and political scientist.
- Alan Baddeley 1957 (M.A.), professor of psychology at University of York.
- Dan Batson 1972, professor emeritus of psychology at University of Kansas.
- Roy Baumeister 1978, professor of psychology, Francis Eppes Eminent Scholar, and social area director at Florida State University.
- Russell Fazio 1978, Harold E. Burtt Professor of Psychology at Ohio State University.
- Michael Friendly 1972, professor of psychology at York University.
- James Gibson, 1925 (B.S.) '28, perception psychologist and philosopher.
- Daniel Gilbert 1985, Harvard College Professor of Psychology at Harvard University.
- Linda E. Ginzel 1989, Clinical Professor of Managerial Psychology, The University of Chicago, Booth School of Business.
- Stevan Harnad 1991, Canada Research Chair in Cognitive Sciences at Université du Québec à Montréal (UQAM) and Professor in the School of Electronics and Computer Science, University of Southampton.
- Mara Mather 2000, Professor of Gerontology and Psychology at University of Southern California.
- Earl K. Miller 1990, Picower Professor of Neuroscience, The Picower Institute for Learning and Memory and Department of Brain & Cognitive Sciences at the Massachusetts Institute of Technology
- Tirin Moore 1995, Professor, Department of Neurobiology, Stanford University and Howard Hughes Medical Institute
- Harold Schlosberg 1928, experimental psychologist.

== Equipment and facilities ==
fMRI scanner in the basement of Green Hall

The department is closely affiliated with the Center for the Study of Brain, Mind, and Behavior (CSBMB), which fosters research on the neural underpinnings of psychological function. The CSBMB houses facilities for the study of brain function, including a research-dedicated, high-field fMRI scanner, an EEG laboratory, a TMS coil, an eye tracking laboratory, and high-performance computing facilities for data analysis and computational modeling. Seventeen faculty members from the department are affiliated with the CSBMB. Unique among research institutions that own and operate fMRI scanners, the CSBMB is the first facility to own a scanner that is run solely by neuroscientists that conduct basic research. Most scanners in the United States are located in clinical settings and are utilized primarily in applied research.

When the university unveiled its $1.75 billion capital campaign in 2007, it allocated $300 million to build a 240,000 sq ft (22,000 m^{2}) headquarters for the department on a site of about 98 acres (400,000 m^{2}). The new psychology building, Peretsman-Scully Hall opened in December, 2013. It is in the shape of a half-circle cylinder, and consists of five floors above general ground level and one floor below ground level. The department shares this space with the Princeton Neuroscience Institute. The complex houses state-of-the-art labs, faculty offices, and classrooms in an attempt to push the university to the forefront of neuroscience and behavioral science research.

== Psychology Library ==
In 1963, the department moved to Green Hall; a room located next to the lobby in the first floor served as the department's academic library. In 1968, two more rooms were added to house monographs and journal stacks. In 1990, the third journal room was moved into the basement to accommodate compact shelving. The Psychology Library, a branch of Princeton University Library, underwent significant renovations in 2002. The basement room was no longer used because the library gained a Reading Room, which has become a popular study space for psychology concentrators. A ramp that leads to the second room was built to ease the reshelving of materials. A librarian's office was built next to one of the computer clusters.

As of 2006, the Psychology Library contains a large collection of material. The library's collections was moved to Lewis Library with the completion of Peretsman-Scully Hall.

== See also ==
- History of psychology
