= Gilles Palsky =

French geographer

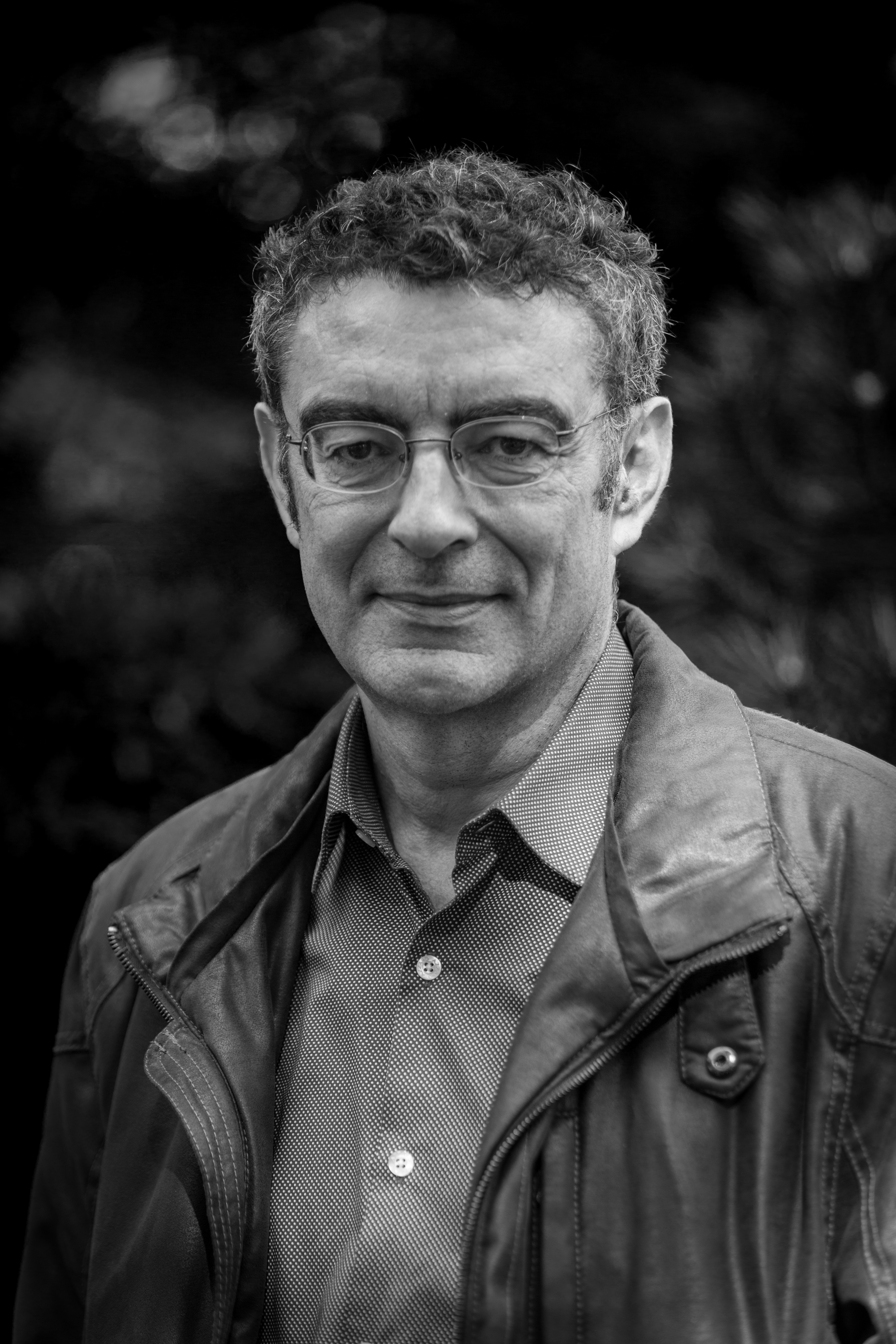
- Gilles Palsky (2015)
- Born: 1958 (age 67–68)
- Education: École normale supérieure de lettres et sciences humaines Paris 12 Val de Marne University
- Scientific career
- Fields: geographer

Gilles Palsky (born 1958), is a French geographer and Professor at the Pantheon-Sorbonne University in Paris, France from 2007 to 2015. He is a member of the editorial board of Cybergéo and Imago Mundi, and known for his work on the history of statistical graphics and thematic mapping in the 19th century.

== Biography ==
Palsky was a student at the Ecole Normale Supérieure (ENS) in Saint-Cloud from 1978 to 1983. He graduated in 1981 in the field of history of geography. In 1990 he obtained his PhD from the University of Paris 1 with a thesis on the history of quantitative mapping before 1914, which was subsequently published in 1996. In 2003 he obtained his habilitation at the Paris 12 Val de Marne University with a thesis, entitled "L'esprit des cartes. Approches historiques, sémiologiques et sociologiques en cartographie" (The spirit of maps. Historical approaches, semiology and sociology in cartography).

Palsky was assistant-professor at the Paris 12 Val de Marne University from 1991 to 2006, and Professor at the Pantheon-Sorbonne University from 2007 to 2014. He was member of the Management Board the Faculty of Humanities and Science at the Pantheon-Sorbonne University, and director of specific research "Territories, Representation, Actors" in the urbanism master program from 2005 to 2007. From 2009 to 2014, he chaired the Scientific Advisory Committee of the 23rd section at the Pantheon-Sorbonne University. Since 2010, he heads the special research "Geoprism" in master programme of geography.

Palsky is a founding member of the OUCARPO (OUvroir de CArtographie POtentielle), an initiative around mapping potential. It was created May 3, 2013, at the initiative of the philosopher Guillaume Monsaingeon.

In 1996 Palsky was awarded the George Erhard award by the French geographical society Société de géographie.

== Work ==
Palsky's research focuses on cartography, geovisualization, urbanism, epistemology and the history of geography. He specialized in the history of statistical mapping in the 19th century, and in the foundations of the graphic semiology. He traced back the history of quantitative mapping methods, and looked into the reasons for their late adoption in geography. His current research focuses on the role of images in the construction of geographical knowledge, on the various forms of participatory mapping, and on mapping theory.

== Selected publications ==
- Palsky, Gilles (with Jean-Marc Besse, Philippe Grand, and Jean-Christophe Bailly). (2019): An Atlas of Geographical Wonders. From Mountaintops to Riverbeds. New York, Princeton Architectural Press, 2019, ISBN 9781616898236.
- Palsky, Gilles (with Jean-Marc Besse and Jean-Christophe Bailly. Le monde sur une feuille : Les tableaux comparatifs de montagnes et de fleuves dans les atlas du XIXe siècle, Lyon, Fage éditions, 2014.
- Palsky, Gilles. La Cartographie thématique en France: recherche sur ses origines et son évolution jusqu'à la fin du XIXe siècle; PhD Thesis Université Paris 1, 1990.
- Palsky, Gilles. Des chiffres et des cartes: naissance et développement de la cartographie quantitative française au XIXe siecle. Vol. 19. Comité des travaux historiques et scientifiques-CTHS, 1996.

Articles, a selection:

- Gilles Palsky (1984). "La naissance de la démocartographie. Analyse historique et sémiologique". Espace, populations, sociétés. 2 (2). Université des Sciences et Technologies de Lille: 25–34. doi:10.3406/espos.1984.956. ISSN 0755-7809.
- Palsky, Gilles. "La cartographie statistique de la population au XIXe siecle." Espace, populations, sociétés 9.3 (1991): 451-458.
- Palsky, Gilles. "The debate on the standardization of statistical maps and diagrams (1857-1901). elements for the history of graphical language." Cybergeo: European Journal of Geography (1999).
- Palsky, Gilles. "Emmanuel de Martonne and the ethnographical cartography of central Europe (1917–1920)." Imago Mundi 54.1 (2002): 111-119.
- Michael Friendly and Gilles Palsky. "Visualizing nature and society". In: James R. Akerman and Robert W. Karrow, eds., Maps: Finding Our Place in the World, pp. 205–251. Chicago, IL: University of Chicago Press. 2007.
- Palsky, Gilles. "Connections and Exchanges in European Thematic Cartography. The case of XIXth century choropleth maps." Formatting Europe. Mapping a continent. 2007.
