= John Joseph McGrath =

John Joseph McGrath may refer to:

- John McGrath (judge) (1945–2018), Judge of the Supreme Court of New Zealand
- John J. McGrath (1872–1951), U.S. Representative from California
