= Maps by Gerardus Mercator =

Gerardus Mercator created many maps in the 16th century.

== List ==
Year and name	Description	Images
1537 Holy Land map Amplissima Terrae Sanctae descriptio ad utriusque Testamenti intelligentiam (a description of the Holy Land for understanding both testaments)	Dedicated to Franciscus van Cranevelt. Size; 67 cm × 122 cm (26 in × 48 in) in 6 sheets. Two copies are extant: one at the library of Perugia and another at the Bibliotheque Nationale de France. Based on a map by the Lutheran Jacob Ziegler. Mercator's map shows the route of the Israelites from Egypt to the Promised Land. The title discloses a hope of helping people in their Bible studies, a Lutheran notion that would have aroused the suspicions of the inquisition.	BNF
1538 world map	This wall map has no title but it is normally referred to as Orbis Imago (from the first sentence of the central legend, below). Size: 54.5 cm × 35.5 cm (21.5 in × 14.0 in). Dedicated to Johannes Drosius. Two copies extant: one at the American Geographical Society Library (link above), and another at the New York Public Library. The first map identifying North American and South America. The map was a slightly modified copy of a 1531 world map (and its text) by Oronce Fine. The double cordiform projection, (Note: For a discussion of cordiform projections see Snyder 1993, p. 37, Figure 1.27) may well have been chosen because of its relationship to aspects of Lutheran beliefs. A notice to the reader (Latin text) at the top of the map says: "Let America, Sarmatia and India bear witness, Dear Reader, that the image of the world you see here is newer and more correct than those that have been circulated hitherto. We propose with regard to the different parts of the world to treat, successively, particular regions more broadly, as we are already doing with Europe, and you may soon expect a universal map, which will not be inferior to that of Ptolemy. Farewell. 1538".	AGSL
1540 Flanders map Flandria	Wall map 96 cm × 125 cm (38 in × 49 in) in 9 sheets. Dedicated to Charles V. This map was commissioned by merchants of Ghent who intended that it should be presented to Charles V in the forlorn hope that it might divert the wrath of the Emperor after their rebellion. It would be a more respectful replacement of a 1538 map by Pieter Van der Beke which had stressed the defiant independence of the Flemish cities. The map is remarkably accurate, and it is presumed to be based on a triangulation of Flanders by Jacob van Deventer. A single original is extant and may be inspected in the Plantin-Moretus Museum: it also appeared in the atlas of 1585 and in the Theatrum Orbis Terrarum of Abraham Ortelius. (Note: The Theatrum Orbis Terrarum may be viewed online. It includes the Mercator maps of the Holy Land, Flanders, Britain and the world (1569).)	Original, copy by Ortelius, 1595 atlas, 1613 atlas
1554 map of Europe Europae descriptio	Wall map 165 cm × 135 cm (65 in × 53 in) on 15 sheets. Dedicated to Antoine Perrenot. No known copy of the whole map has been discovered but several copies of the map were cut and re-assembled (by Mercator) for inclusion in the unique Atlas of Europe from 1570–72, for example the map of Spain on pages 7 and 8 but not the map of Europe on pages 1 and 2 which is taken from the 1569 world map. They are available in facsimile. The map used a cordiform projection. It was revised by Mercator in 1572 and again by Rumold for the 1595 atlas. The 1595 map uses a different projection.	1595 version.
1564 British Isles map Anglia & Scotiae & Hibernie nova descriptio	Wall map 92 cm × 122 cm (36 in × 48 in) on 8 sheets. Mercator states that a friend, possibly Antoine Perrenot, had requested that he engrave this map from a manuscript copy, possibly by John Elder, a disaffected Scottish Catholic priest. Several copies of this map were cut and re-assembled for the atlas of Europe. The map is oriented with west at the top. 4 copies known.	1570 atlas Individual sheets, Ortelius copy, de Jode copy
1564 Lorraine (Lotharingia)	A map commissioned by Duke René of Lorraine. The single copy of the map was never published but two detailed maps of Lorraine (north and south) appear in the Atlas of 1585.	
1569 world map		
1570–1572 Atlas of Europe	A unique collection of maps assembled in the early 1570s, many of which are assembled from portions of Mercator's earlier maps: 9 constructed from Europe (1554), 6 from British Isles (1564) and 2 from the world map (1569). The map of Europe on pages 1 and 2 is taken from the 1569 world map. There are also 2 manuscript maps of Mercator and 13 maps are from the Theatrum Orbis Terrarum of Abraham Ortelius.) Mercator did not term this collection of maps an atlas.	View online version 1 and version 2.
1578 Ptolemy's Geographia Tabulae geographicae Cl. Ptolemaei ad mentem auctoris restitutis ac emendatis. (Geographic maps according to Claudius Ptolemy, drawn in the spirit of the author and expanded by Gerard Mercator)	Mercator's definitive version of Ptolemy's 28 maps. A second edition including the revised text of Geographia was published in 1584. Geographiae Libri Octo : recogniti iam et diligenter emendati. Example map: Britain	View online
1585 Atlas Galliae, Belgii Inferioris, Germaniae	The first collection of 51 modern maps: 16 of France (with Switzerland), 9 corresponding to Belgium and the Netherlands and 26 of Germany. The three sections, each with a title page, dedication and supporting text, were sold together and separately. (Mercator did not term this collection of maps as an atlas.)	Belgii inferioris descriptio emendata cum circumiacentium regionii confinijs Zeelant insularum loca aliquot numeris (IA dr belgii-inferioris-descriptio-emendata-cum-circumiacentium-regionii-confinij-10554053)
1589 Atlas Italiae, Sclavoniae, Grecia.	A second collection of 23 modern maps: 16 of Italy (including Corsica), 3 of Styria and the other Balkan countries, 4 of Greece. (Once again Mercator did not term this collection of maps as an atlas but in the preface he introduces Atlas as a mythical King of Mauretania—a learned philosopher, mathematician and astronomer, credited with the making of the first globe.) This collection has a dedication to Prince Ferdinando de' Medici to whom Mercator attributes ancestry from King Atlas.	(To view see 1595 Atlas).
1595 Atlas Atlas Sive Cosmographicae Meditationes de Fabrica Mundi et Fabricati Figura. (Atlas or cosmographical meditations upon the creation of the universe, and the universe as created.)	Published posthumously by Rumold Mercator. This is the first time that the name Atlas is used as a title of a collection of maps. Many library copies are available worldwide. There are also a number of freely available digital volumes such as those at the Library of Congress and Darlington Library (University of Pittsburgh). High resolution facsimiles were made available by Octavo Publications (now defunct) but their CD is still available from retailers; (Note: The Octavo CD may be obtained from retailers such as Fine Books) the CD is accompanied by an introduction to the atlas by (Karrow 2000) and a translation of all the text Sullivan (2000) and both of these are freely available in an archived version from the New York Society Library. The atlas includes further 28 maps: 16 of Britain, 4 of Denmark and one each of the polar regions, Iceland, Norway with Sweden, Prussia, Livonia, Russia, Lithuania, Transylvania and Crimea. This collection of maps is dedicated to Queen Elizabeth of England and in the preface Mercator acknowledges the information he received from English mariners through Rumold who had spent much of his working life in London. The full atlas included all the maps of the previous two collections, making in all 102 new maps by Mercator. His heirs added 5 introductory maps before publication: world map and Europe by Rumold, Africa and Asia by grandson Gerard and America by grandson Michael. Nevertheless the atlas was incomplete: Spain was omitted and there were no detailed maps outside Europe. The maps are in a variety of projections. (Note: Projections used in the 1585 atlas: see Keuning 1947) Less than half the pages in the atlas are maps. The title page shows King Atlas holding a globe, not supporting it, then the portrait of Mercator, a dedication to the Dukes of Cleves (father and son), a eulogy on the portrait, two epitaphs, the biography by Ghim, another epitaph by his grandson, two 'testimonial' letters, an ode on King Atlas by a grandson and Mercators own genealogy of Atlas in which he outlines his intended plans for the rest of the atlas: a description of the creation events, then a description of all that was created in the heavens (astronomy and astrology) and finally a description of the Earth, its geography. Of this grandiose plan all that was completed were the first and last objectives. The first part of the atlas, De mundi creatione ac fabrica liber (The creation of the world and the structure of the book), consists of 27 pages of text on the theology of creation, the events of creation, the elements created (such as animals, plants, sun, moon, stars, man), the Fall of Man and finally the salvation of creation through Christ. The second part of the Atlas contains the maps but each section has its own title page, dedication and preface, and every country is succinctly supplemented by text describing a mixture of history, royal genealogy, ecclesiastical hierarchies, list of universities and occasionally facets of contemporary economy. Every place mentioned in the text is given its geographic coordinates (Note: Longitudes in the atlas are referred to the prime meridian of Ptolemy and differ from present day values by approximately 18 degrees (notwithstanding the errors in Mercator's data).) to the nearest minute. As an example of the textual content the section on the British Isles mentions (amongst other things): alternative names; the etymology of British and its relation to woad painted tribes; climate; lack of snakes; the seemly manners of the populace; coroners and ecclesiastical courts; lists of counties, bishoprics and universities; the structure of aristocracy; and much more, even a list of recommended reading.	View online.Translation online.

== Bibliography ==
- Barber, Peter M. (1998). "The British Isles". In Watelet, Marcel (ed.). The Mercator Atlas of Europe: Facsimile of the Maps of Gerardus Mercator Contained in the Atlas of Europe, circa 1570—1572. Pleasant Hill, Oreg.: Walking Tree Press. pp. 43–77.
- Crane, Nicholas (2003). Mercator: the man who mapped the planet (paperback ed.). London: Phoenix (Orion Books Ltd). ISBN 0-7538-1692-X. OCLC 493338836. Original hardback edition published by Weidenfeld & Nicolson (London), 2002. Published in New York by H. Holt.
- Karrow, Robert William (2000), An introduction to the Mercator atlas of 1595. This commentary, which accompanies the facsimile edition of the 1595 atlas published by Octavo (OCLC 48878698), is freely available in an archived version. from the New York Society Library, pages 1–20 of the introduction to the atlas (pdf pages 2–21).
- Keuning, J. (1947), "The History of an Atlas: Mercator. Hondius", Imago Mundi, 4: 37–62, doi:10.1080/03085694708591880, JSTOR 1149747
- Snyder, John P (1993), Flattening the Earth: Two Thousand Years of Map Projections, University of Chicago Press, ISBN 0-226-76747-7
- Sullivan, David (2000), A translation of the full text of the Mercator atlas of 1595. This translation, which accompanies the facsimile edition of the 1595 atlas published by Octavo (OCLC 48878698), is freely available in an archived version from the New York Society Library.
- Watelet, Marcel, ed. (1997), The Mercator Atlas of Europe: Facsimile of the Maps by Gerardus Mercator Contained in the Atlas of Europe, circa 1570–1572, Walking Tree Press, PO Box 871, Pleasant Hill, OR 97455, ISBN 978-0-9659735-7-1. Includes 17 facsimile maps and an introduction and 4 other articles: The atlas of Europe (Marcel Watelet), Atlas, birth of a title (James R. Akerman), The map of Europe (Arthur Dürst, The British Isles (Peter M. Barber), The 1569 world map (Mireille Pastoureau). Abstracts. A substantial excerpt of Barber's article appeared in the Mercator's World magazine.
- Woodward, David, ed. (1987), The History of Cartography, Volume 3, Cartography in the European Renaissance, University of Chicago, ISBN 978-0-226-90732-1, OCLC 166342669. Chapter 6 on Globes in Renaissance Europe by Dekker is available online. Chapter 44 on "Commercial Cartography and Map Production in the Low Countries, 1500–ca. 1672" by Cornelis Koeman, Günter Schilder, Marco van Egmond, and Peter van der Krogt is also available online. Archived 24 November 2016 at the Wayback Machine
