= Lloyd Free =

The person Lloyd Free may refer to:

- Lloyd A. Free, American pollster, or
- World B. Free, American basketball player.
