= Michael Friendly =

American-Canadian psychologist (born 1945)

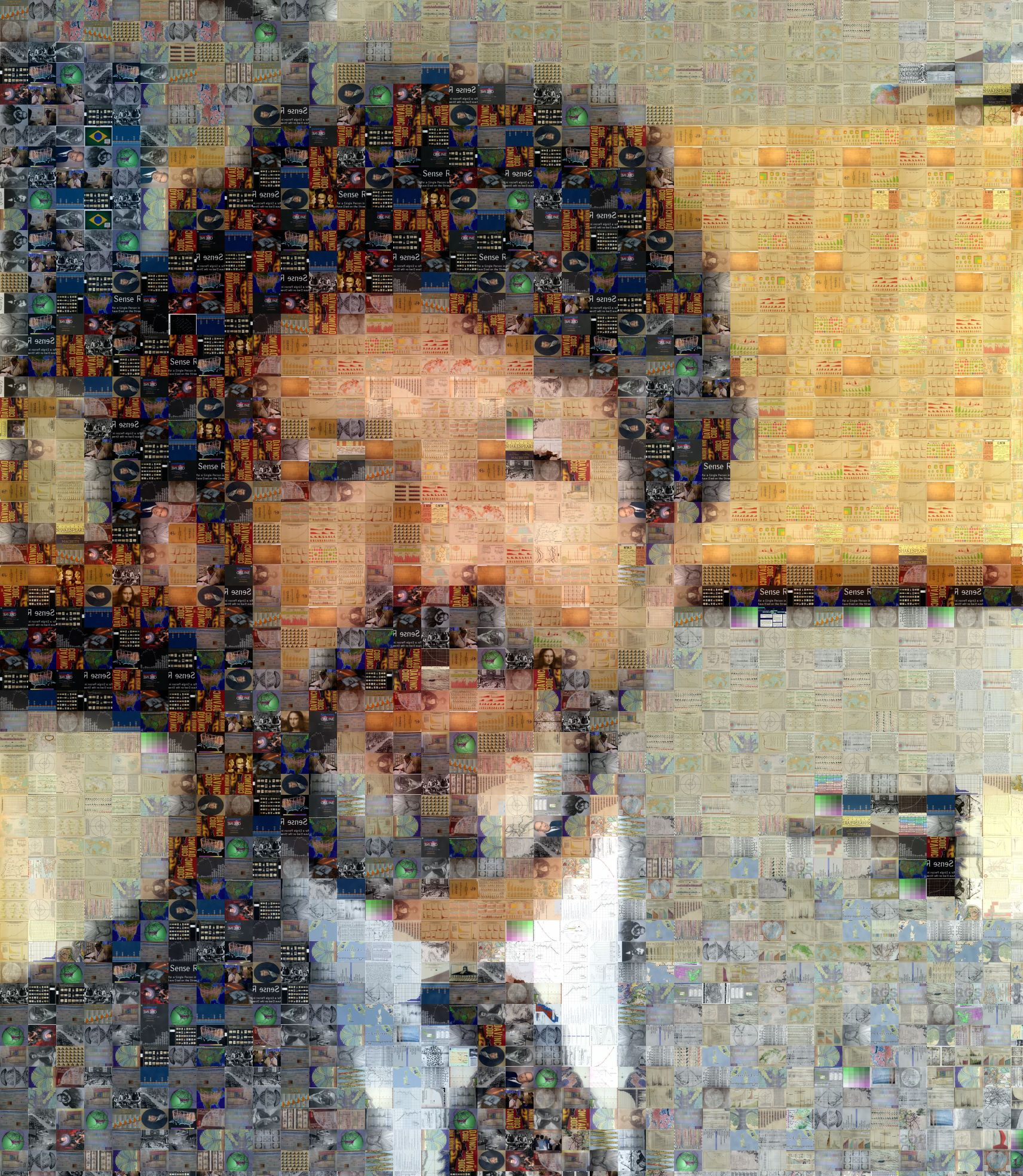
- Photo mosaic of Michael Friendly, composed of image tiles from the history of data visualization
- Born: May 7, 1945 (age 81); New York City, New York, U.S.
- Citizenship: Canadian, American
- Education: Rensselaer Polytechnic Institute (BS); Princeton University (MS, PhD)
- Known for: mosaic plot
- Scientific career
- Fields: Psychology, data visualization, statistics
- Workplaces: York University, Toronto
- Doctoral advisor: Harold Gulliksen

Michael Louis Friendly (born 1945) is a Canadian psychologist, Professor of Psychology at York University in Ontario, Canada, and director of its Statistical Consulting Service, especially known for his contributions to graphical methods for categorical and multivariate data, and on the history of data and information visualisation.

== Biography ==
Born in New York City, Friendly obtained his BS in 1966 from the Rensselaer Polytechnic Institute, and his MS in 1969 from Princeton University. In 1971/2 he also obtained his PhD in psychology at Princeton under supervision of Harold Gulliksen and Peter Ornstein, with the thesis titled "Proximity Analysis and the Structure of Organization in Free Recall."

Friendly's first research project in the field of psychometrics and cognitive psychology had started at the Educational Testing Service and Princeton University, and was made possible by a Psychometric Fellowship awarded by the Educational Testing Service. After graduation Friendly jointed the Department of Psychology at the York University in Ontario, Canada, where he continued his research. At the York University he was appointed Associate Professor and later on Professor of Psychology, and since 1985 also director of its Statistical Consulting Service.

Friendly is Associate Editor of the Journal of Computational and Graphical Statistics and an Editor of Statistical Science. In 2018 he became a Fellow of the American Statistical Association.

== Work ==
Friendly's research interests have developed over years. It started in the 1970s with the application of quantitative and computer methods to problems in cognitive psychology, including the cognitive aspects of extracting information from graphical displays. In the 1990s Friendly started focussing on the history of statistics and data visualization, and furthermore graphical methods for data and information visualization.

== Publications ==
=== Books ===
- Friendly, Michael (1988). Advanced logo : a language for learning. Hillsdale, N.J.: Lawrence Erlbaum Associates. ISBN 0-89859-933-4. OCLC 15316932.
- Friendly, Michael (1991). SAS system for statistical graphics. SAS Institute (1st ed.). Cary, NC: SAS Institute. ISBN 1-59047-496-1. OCLC 56884186.
- Friendly, Michael (2000). Visualizing categorical data. Cary, NC: SAS Institute. ISBN 1580256600. OCLC 176044938.
- Young, Forrest W.; Valero-Mora, Pedro; Friendly, Michael (2006). Visual statistics : seeing data with dynamic interactive graphics. Hoboken, N.J.: Wiley-Interscience. ISBN 0-471-68160-1. OCLC 64689034.
- Friendly, Michael (2016). Discrete data analysis with R : visualization and modeling techniques for categorical and count data. David Meyer. Boca Raton. ISBN 978-1-4987-2583-5. OCLC 912377273.Support web site
- Friendly, Michael; Wainer, Howard (2021). A history of data visualization and graphic communication. Cambridge, Massachusetts: Harvard University Press. ISBN 978-0-674-25903-4. OCLC 1251175126.

=== Selected articles and reports ===
- 1991. "Interpreting higher order interactions in loglinear analysis: A picture is worth 1000 words". With John Fox. Tech. rep., Institute for Social Research, York University, Toronto, CA.
- 1992. "Graphical methods for categorical data". In: Proceedings of the SAS User's Group International Conference, 17:1367-1373.
- 1994. "A fourfold display for 2 by 2 by K tables". Tech. Rep. 217, York University, Psychology Dept.
- 1994. "Mosaic displays for multi-way contingency tables". In: Journal of the American Statistical Association, 89:190-200.
- 2000. "A brief history of the mosaic display." Journal of Computational and Graphical Statistics. 11(1):89-107. URL
- 2000. "The roots and branches of statistical graphics". With Dan Denis. In: Journal de la Société Française de Statistique, 141(4):51-60. (published in 2001).
- 2001/2008. "Milestones in the history of thematic cartography, statistical graphics, and data visualization", URL www.datavis.ca/milestones 32 (2001): 13. .
- 2007. "A brief history of data visualization". In: C. Chen, Wolfgang Härdle and Antony Unwin, eds., Handbook of Computational Statistics: Data Visualization, vol. III, chap. 1, pp. 1–34. Heidelberg: Springer-Verlag.
- 2007. "Visualizing nature and society". With Gilles Palsky. In: James R. Akerman and Robert W. Karrow, eds., Maps: Finding Our Place in the World, pp. 205–251. Chicago, IL: University of Chicago Press.
- 2007. "HE plots for Multivariate General Linear Models." Journal of Computational and Graphical Statistics, 16, 421–444.
