= California's 8th congressional district =

U.S. House district for California

- Interactive map of district boundaries
- Representative: John Garamendi; D–Walnut Grove
- Population (2025): 756,615
- Median household income: $100,581
- Ethnicity: 35.2% Hispanic; 24.0% White; 18.3% Asian; 15.1% Black; 5.7% Two or more races; 1.9% other
- Cook PVI: D+24

California's 8th congressional district is a congressional district in the U.S. state of California. As of 2023, Democrat John Garamendi represents the district. Currently, the 8th district includes parts of the Bay Area counties of Contra Costa County and Solano County, including the cities of Vallejo, Fairfield, Richmond and parts of Martinez.

== Competitiveness ==
Before the 2011 redistricting, the 8th district was a Democratic stronghold. It gave John Kerry his best performance in California in 2004, backing the Democrat with 84.2% of the vote. Barack Obama continued on this trend in 2008 when he received 85.22% of the vote in the district while John McCain received 12.38%.

The 8th district from 2013-2023 was located in a politically conservative region of the state with a "Strongly Republican" Cook Partisan Voting Index of R+10. The Cook Political Report ranked it the 87th most Republican-leaning congressional district in the United States.

In the 2012 election, the first after the state's adoption of top-two primaries, the 8th district was one of only two in California where two Republicans faced each other in a runoff election. In 2018, it was the only such California district. In 2022, the district was moved to the northern San Francisco Bay Area and became solidly Democratic.

== Recent election results from statewide races ==
=== 2023–2027 boundaries ===
Year	Office	Results
2008	President	Obama 76% - 24%
2010	Governor	Brown 71% - 25%
2010	Lt. Governor	Newsom 67% - 25%
2010	Secretary of State	Bowen 69% - 23%
2010	Attorney General	Harris 64% - 28%
2010	Treasurer	Lockyer 72% - 21%
2010	Controller	Chiang 71% - 21%
2012	President	Obama 78% - 22%
2014	Governor	Brown 77% - 23%
2016	President	Clinton 75% - 19%
2018	Governor	Newsom 75% - 25%
2018	Attorney General	Becerra 76% - 24%
2020	President	Biden 76% - 22%
2022	Senate (Reg.)	Padilla 75% - 25%
2022	Governor	Newsom 74% - 26%
2022	Lt. Governor	Kounalakis 74% - 26%
2022	Secretary of State	Weber 75% - 25%
2022	Attorney General	Bonta 74% - 26%
2022	Treasurer	Ma 74% - 26%
2022	Controller	Cohen 71% - 29%
2024	President	Harris 70% - 27%
2024	Senate (Reg.)	Schiff 72% - 28%

== Composition ==
FIPS County Code	County	Seat	Population
13	Contra Costa	Martinez	1,161,413
95	Solano	Fairfield	451,716

Under the 2020 redistricting, California's 8th district is located in parts of the San Francisco Bay Area counties of Contra Costa and Solano. The area in Contra Costa County includes the north side of the cities of Antioch and Martinez; the cities of Pittsburg, Richmond, San Pablo, El Cerrito, Pinole, and Hercules; and the census-designated places Kensington, East Richmond Heights, North Richmond, Rollingwood, El Sobrante, Montalvin Manor, Tara Hills, Bayview, Rodeo, Crockett, Port Costa, and Bay Point. The area in Solano County includes part of the city of Vacaville; the entirety of the cities of Vallejo, Fairfield, Suisun City, and Benicia; and the census-designated places Green Valley and Elmira.

Contra Costa County is split between this district and the 10th district. They are partitioned by Grizzly Peak Blvd, Seaview Trail, Camino Pablo, Bear Creek Rd, San Pablo Creek, Bear Creek, Brianes Reservoir, Burlington Northern Santa Fe, Highway 4, Alhambra Ave, Pacheco Blvd, Grandview Ave, Central Ave, Imhoff Dr, Bares Ave, Mount Diablo Creek, Union Pacific, Contra Costa Canal, 4WD Rd, Bailey Rd, James Donlon Blvd, Cambridge Dr, Reseda Way, S Royal links Cir, Carpinteria Dr, Barmouth Dr, Hillcrest Ave, Highway 4, and Highway 160.

Solano County is split between this district and the 4th district. They are partitioned by Soda Springs Rd, Union Pacific, Alamo Dr, Leisure Town Rd, Hawkins Rd, Bay Area Exxextric, Shilo Rd, Collinsville Rd, and Montezuma Slough.

=== Cities and CDPs with 10,000 or more people ===
- Vallejo – 126,090
- Fairfield – 119,881
- Richmond – 116,448
- Antioch – 115,291
- Vacaville – 102,386
- Pittsburg – 76,416
- Martinez – 37,287
- San Pablo – 32,127
- Suisun City – 29,518
- Benicia – 27,131
- Hercules – 26,016
- El Cerrito – 25,962
- Bay Point – 23,896
- Pinole – 19,022
- El Sobrante – 15,524

=== 2,500 – 10,000 people ===
- Rodeo – 9,653
- Kensington – 5,428
- Tara Hills – 5,364
- North Richmond – 4,175
- East Richmond Heights – 3,460
- Crockett – 3,242
- Montalvin Manor – 3,099
- Rollingwood – 3,015

== Future composition ==
Beginning with the 2026 election, the 8th district will consist of the following counties:

- Contra Costa (part)
- Sacramento (part)
- San Joaquin (part)
- Solano
- Yolo (part)

== List of members representing the district ==
Member	Party	Dates	Cong ress(es)	Electoral history	Counties
District created March 4, 1903
Milton J. Daniels (Riverside)	Republican	March 4, 1903 – March 3, 1905	58th	Elected in 1902. Retired.	1903–1913; Imperial, Inyo, Kern, Orange, Riverside, San Bernardino, San Diego, San Luis Obispo, Santa Barbara, Tulare, Ventura
Sylvester C. Smith (Bakersfield)	Republican	March 4, 1905 – January 26, 1913	59th 60th 61st 62nd	Elected in 1904. Re-elected in 1906. Re-elected in 1908. Re-elected in 1910. Died.	1903–1913; Imperial, Inyo, Kern, Orange, Riverside, San Bernardino, San Diego, San Luis Obispo, Santa Barbara, Tulare, Ventura
Vacant		January 27, 1913 – March 3, 1913	62nd		1903–1913; Imperial, Inyo, Kern, Orange, Riverside, San Bernardino, San Diego, San Luis Obispo, Santa Barbara, Tulare, Ventura
Everis A. Hayes (San Jose)	Republican	March 4, 1913 – March 3, 1919	63rd 64th 65th	Redistricted from the 5th district and re-elected in 1912. Re-elected in 1914. Re-elected in 1916. Lost re-election.	1913–1933; Monterey, San Benito, San Luis Obispo, San Mateo, Santa Barbara, Santa Clara, Santa Cruz, Ventura
Hugh S. Hersman (Gilroy)	Democratic	March 4, 1919 – March 3, 1921	66th	Elected in 1918. Lost re-election.	1913–1933; Monterey, San Benito, San Luis Obispo, San Mateo, Santa Barbara, Santa Clara, Santa Cruz, Ventura
Arthur M. Free (San Jose)	Republican	March 4, 1921 – March 3, 1933	67th 68th 69th 70th 71st 72nd	Elected in 1920. Re-elected in 1922. Re-elected in 1924. Re-elected in 1926. Re-elected in 1928. Re-elected in 1930. Lost re-election.	1913–1933; Monterey, San Benito, San Luis Obispo, San Mateo, Santa Barbara, Santa Clara, Santa Cruz, Ventura
John J. McGrath (San Mateo)	Democratic	March 4, 1933 – January 3, 1939	73rd 74th 75th	Elected in 1932. Re-elected in 1934. Re-elected in 1936. Lost re-election.	1933–1943; Monterey, San Benito, San Mateo, Santa Clara, Santa Cruz
Jack Z. Anderson (San Juan Bautista)	Republican	January 3, 1939 – January 3, 1953	76th 77th 78th 79th 80th 81st 82nd	Elected in 1938. Re-elected in 1940. Re-elected in 1942. Re-elected in 1944. Re-elected in 1946. Re-elected in 1948. Re-elected in 1950. Retired.	1933–1943; Monterey, San Benito, San Mateo, Santa Clara, Santa Cruz
Jack Z. Anderson (San Juan Bautista)	Republican	January 3, 1939 – January 3, 1953	76th 77th 78th 79th 80th 81st 82nd	Elected in 1938. Re-elected in 1940. Re-elected in 1942. Re-elected in 1944. Re-elected in 1946. Re-elected in 1948. Re-elected in 1950. Retired.	1943–1953; San Benito, San Mateo, Santa Clara, Santa Cruz
George P. Miller (Alameda)	Democratic	January 3, 1953 – January 3, 1973	83rd 84th 85th 86th 87th 88th 89th 90th 91st 92nd	Redistricted from the 6th district and re-elected in 1952. Re-elected in 1954. Re-elected in 1956. Re-elected in 1958. Re-elected in 1960. Re-elected in 1962. Re-elected in 1964. Re-elected in 1966. Re-elected in 1968. Re-elected in 1970. Lost renomination.	1953–1975; Alameda outside Oakland
Pete Stark (Danville)	Democratic	January 3, 1973 – January 3, 1975	93rd	Elected in 1972. Redistricted to the 9th district.	1953–1975; Alameda outside Oakland
Ron Dellums (Berkeley)	Democratic	January 3, 1975 – January 3, 1993	94th 95th 96th 97th 98th 99th 100th 101st 102nd	Redistricted from the 7th district and re-elected in 1974. Re-elected in 1976. Re-elected in 1978. Re-elected in 1980. Re-elected in 1982. Re-elected in 1984. Re-elected in 1986. Re-elected in 1988. Re-elected in 1990. Redistricted to the 9th district.	1975–1983; Alameda (Oakland)
Ron Dellums (Berkeley)	Democratic	January 3, 1975 – January 3, 1993	94th 95th 96th 97th 98th 99th 100th 101st 102nd	Redistricted from the 7th district and re-elected in 1974. Re-elected in 1976. Re-elected in 1978. Re-elected in 1980. Re-elected in 1982. Re-elected in 1984. Re-elected in 1986. Re-elected in 1988. Re-elected in 1990. Redistricted to the 9th district.	1983–1993; Alameda (Oakland), southwestern Contra Costa
Nancy Pelosi (San Francisco)	Democratic	January 3, 1993 – January 3, 2013	103rd 104th 105th 106th 107th 108th 109th 110th 111th 112th	Redistricted from the 5th district and re-elected in 1992. Re-elected in 1994. Re-elected in 1996. Re-elected in 1998. Re-elected in 2000. Re-elected in 2002. Re-elected in 2004. Re-elected in 2006. Re-elected in 2008. Re-elected in 2010. Redistricted to the 12th district.	1993–2003; Most of San Francisco
Nancy Pelosi (San Francisco)	Democratic	January 3, 1993 – January 3, 2013	103rd 104th 105th 106th 107th 108th 109th 110th 111th 112th	Redistricted from the 5th district and re-elected in 1992. Re-elected in 1994. Re-elected in 1996. Re-elected in 1998. Re-elected in 2000. Re-elected in 2002. Re-elected in 2004. Re-elected in 2006. Re-elected in 2008. Re-elected in 2010. Redistricted to the 12th district.	2003–2013: Most of San Francisco
Paul Cook (Yucca Valley)	Republican	January 3, 2013 – December 7, 2020	113th 114th 115th 116th	Elected in 2012. Re-elected in 2014. Re-elected in 2016. Re-elected in 2018. Resigned when elected to the San Bernardino County Board of Supervisors.	2013–2023 Inyo, Mono, most of San Bernardino
Vacant		December 7, 2020 – January 3, 2021	116th		2013–2023 Inyo, Mono, most of San Bernardino
Jay Obernolte (Big Bear Lake)	Republican	January 3, 2021 – January 3, 2023	117th	Elected in 2020. Redistricted to the 23rd district.	2013–2023 Inyo, Mono, most of San Bernardino
John Garamendi (Walnut Grove)	Democratic	January 3, 2023 – present	118th 119th	Redistricted from the 3rd district and re-elected in 2022. Re-elected in 2024. Re-elected in 2026.	2023–present Parts of Contra Costa and Solano

== Election results ==
=== 1902 ===
United States House of Representatives elections, 1902
Party	Candidate	Votes	%
Republican	Milton J. Daniels	20,135	55.6%
Democratic	William E. Smythe	15,819	40.8%
Socialist	Noble A. Richardson	2,091	5.4%
Prohibition	Ellsworth Leonardson	762	2.0%
Total votes		38,807	100.0%
Republican win (new seat)			

=== 1904 ===
United States House of Representatives elections, 1904
Party	Candidate	Votes	%
Republican	Sylvester C. Smith	23,683	55.6%
Democratic	William T. Lucas	12,861	34.5%
Socialist	Noble A. Richardson	4,636	9.9%
Prohibition	Benjamin J. Cloes	1,430	3.4%
Total votes		42,610	100.0%
Republican hold			

=== 1906 ===
United States House of Representatives elections, 1906
Party	Candidate	Votes	%
Republican	Sylvester C. Smith (Incumbent)	22,548	55.6%
Democratic	Charles A. Barlow	13,992	34.5%
Socialist	Noble A. Richardson	4,003	9.9%
Total votes		40,543	100.0%
Republican hold			

=== 1908 ===
United States House of Representatives elections, 1908
Party	Candidate	Votes	%
Republican	Sylvester C. Smith (Incumbent)	28,202	50.5%
Democratic	William G. Irving	18,958	33.9%
Socialist	George A. Garrett	7,302	13.1%
Prohibition	James S. Edwards	1,379	2.5%
Total votes		45,831	100.0%
Republican hold			

=== 1910 ===
United States House of Representatives elections, 1910
Party	Candidate	Votes	%
Republican	Sylvester C. Smith (Incumbent)	28,202	50.5%
Democratic	William G. Irving	18,958	33.9%
Socialist	George A. Garrett	7,302	13.1%
Prohibition	James S. Edwards	1,379	2.5%
Total votes		45,831	100.0%
Republican hold			

=== 1912 ===
United States House of Representatives elections, 1912
Party	Candidate	Votes	%
Republican	Everis A. Hayes (Incumbent)	29,861	50.9%
Democratic	James B. Holohan	20,620	35.2%
Progressive	Robert Whitaker	8,125	13.9%
Total votes		58,606	100.0%
Republican hold			

=== 1914 ===
United States House of Representatives elections, 1914
Party	Candidate	Votes	%
Republican	Everis A. Hayes (Incumbent)	36,499	49.1%
Progressive	Lewis Dan Bohnett	33,706	45.3%
Prohibition	Joseph Merritt Horton	4,157	5.6%
Total votes		74,362	100.0%
Republican hold			

=== 1916 ===
United States House of Representatives elections, 1916
Party	Candidate	Votes	%
Republican	Everis A. Hayes (Incumbent)	50,659	68.6%
Progressive	George S. Walker	17,576	23.8%
Socialist	Cora Pattleton Wilson	5,564	7.5%
Total votes		73,799	100.0%
Republican hold			

=== 1918 ===
United States House of Representatives elections, 1918
Party	Candidate	Votes	%
Democratic	Hugh S. Hersman	31,167	53%
Republican	Everis A. Hayes (Incumbent)	27,641	47%
Total votes		58,808	100%
Democratic gain from Republican			

=== 1920 ===
United States House of Representatives elections, 1920
Party	Candidate	Votes	%
Republican	Arthur M. Free	46,823	64%
Democratic	Hugh S. Hersman (Incumbent)	26,311	36%
Total votes		73,134	100%
Republican gain from Democratic			

=== 1922 ===
United States House of Representatives elections, 1922
Party	Candidate	Votes	%
Republican	Arthur M. Free (Incumbent)	57,926	100.0%
Republican hold			

=== 1924 ===
United States House of Representatives elections, 1924
Party	Candidate	Votes	%
Republican	Arthur M. Free (Incumbent)	55,713	100.0%
Republican hold			

=== 1926 ===
United States House of Representatives elections, 1926
Party	Candidate	Votes	%
Republican	Arthur M. Free (Incumbent)	60,384	67.7%
Democratic	Philip G. Sheehy	28,836	32.3%
Total votes		89,220	100.0%
Republican hold			

=== 1928 ===
United States House of Representatives elections, 1928
Party	Candidate	Votes	%
Republican	Arthur M. Free (Incumbent)	80,613	68%
Democratic	Cecelia M. Casserly	37,947	32%
Total votes		118,560	100%
Republican hold			

=== 1930 ===
United States House of Representatives elections, 1930
Party	Candidate	Votes	%
Republican	Arthur M. Free (Incumbent)	93,377	100.0%
Republican hold			

=== 1932 ===
United States House of Representatives elections, 1932
Party	Candidate	Votes	%
Democratic	John J. McGrath	65,455	56.9%
Republican	Arthur M. Free (Incumbent)	49,487	43.1%
Total votes		114,942	100.0%
Democratic gain from Republican			

=== 1934 ===
United States House of Representatives elections, 1934
Party	Candidate	Votes	%
Democratic	John J. McGrath (Incumbent)	107,325	100.0%
Democratic hold			

=== 1936 ===
United States House of Representatives elections, 1936
Party	Candidate	Votes	%
Democratic	John J. McGrath (Incumbent)	78,557	57.6%
Republican	Alonzo L. Baker	57,808	43.4%
Total votes		136,365	100.0%
Democratic hold			

=== 1938 ===
United States House of Representatives elections, 1938
Party	Candidate	Votes	%
Republican	Jack Z. Anderson	84,084	55%
Democratic	John J. McGrath (Incumbent)	68,681	45%
Total votes		152,765	100%
Republican gain from Democratic			

=== 1940 ===
United States House of Representatives elections, 1940
Party	Candidate	Votes	%
Republican	Jack Z. Anderson (Incumbent)	148,180	96.7%
Communist	Elizabeth Nichols	5,186	3.3%
Democratic	John J. McGrath (write-in)	37	0.1%
Total votes		153,403	100.0%
Republican hold			

=== 1942 ===
United States House of Representatives elections, 1942
Party	Candidate	Votes	%
Republican	Jack Z. Anderson (Incumbent)	91,536	99.9%
Communist	Elizabeth Nichols (write-in)	102	0.1%
Total votes		91,638	100.0%
Republican hold			

=== 1944 ===
United States House of Representatives elections, 1944
Party	Candidate	Votes	%
Republican	Jack Z. Anderson (Incumbent)	94,218	56.5%
Democratic	Arthur L. Johnson	72,420	43.5%
Total votes		166,638	100.0%
Republican hold			

=== 1946 ===
United States House of Representatives elections, 1946
Party	Candidate	Votes	%
Republican	Jack Z. Anderson (Incumbent)	113,325	100.0%
Republican hold			

=== 1948 ===
United States House of Representatives elections, 1948
Party	Candidate	Votes	%
Republican	Jack Z. Anderson (Incumbent)	161,743	79.9%
Progressive	Paul Taylor	40,670	20.1%
Total votes		202,413	100.0%
Republican hold			

=== 1950 ===
United States House of Representatives elections, 1950
Party	Candidate	Votes	%
Republican	Jack Z. Anderson (Incumbent)	168,510	83.1%
Progressive	John A. Peterson	34,176	16.9%
Total votes		202,686	100.0%
Republican hold			

=== 1952 ===
United States House of Representatives elections, 1952
Party	Candidate	Votes	%
Democratic	George P. Miller (Incumbent)	156,445	100.0%
Democratic hold			

=== 1954 ===
United States House of Representatives elections, 1954
Party	Candidate	Votes	%
Democratic	George P. Miller (Incumbent)	101,803	65.4%
Republican	Jessie M. Ritchie	53,869	34.6%
Total votes		155,672	100.0%
Democratic hold			

=== 1956 ===
United States House of Representatives elections, 1956
Party	Candidate	Votes	%
Democratic	George P. Miller (Incumbent)	136,720	65.6%
Republican	Robert Lee Watkins	71,700	34.4%
Total votes		208,420	100.0%
Democratic hold			

=== 1958 ===
United States House of Representatives elections, 1958
Party	Candidate	Votes	%
Democratic	George P. Miller (Incumbent)	181,437	100.0%
Democratic hold			

=== 1960 ===
United States House of Representatives elections, 1960
Party	Candidate	Votes	%
Democratic	George P. Miller (Incumbent)	152,476	62%
Republican	Robert E. Hannon	93,403	38%
Total votes		245,879	100%
Democratic hold			

=== 1962 ===
United States House of Representatives elections, 1962
Party	Candidate	Votes	%
Democratic	George P. Miller (Incumbent)	97,014	72.5%
Republican	Harold Petersen	36,810	27.5%
Total votes		133,824	100.0%
Democratic hold			

=== 1964 ===
United States House of Representatives elections, 1964
Party	Candidate	Votes	%
Democratic	George P. Miller (Incumbent)	108,771	70.3%
Republican	Donald E. McKay	46,063	29.7%
Total votes		154,834	100.0%
Democratic hold			

=== 1966 ===
United States House of Representatives elections, 1966
Party	Candidate	Votes	%
Democratic	George P. Miller (Incumbent)	92,263	65.4%
Republican	Raymond P. Britton	48,727	34.6%
Total votes		140,990	100.0%
Democratic hold			

=== 1968 ===
United States House of Representatives elections, 1968
Party	Candidate	Votes	%
Democratic	George P. Miller (Incumbent)	104,231	64%
Republican	Raymond P. Britton	58,584	36%
Total votes		162,815	100%
Democratic hold			

=== 1970 ===
United States House of Representatives elections, 1970
Party	Candidate	Votes	%
Democratic	George P. Miller (Incumbent)	104,311	69%
Republican	Michael A. Crane	46,872	31%
Total votes		151,183	100%
Democratic hold			

=== 1972 ===
United States House of Representatives elections, 1972
Party	Candidate	Votes	%
Democratic	Pete Stark	101,024	52.9%
Republican	Lew M. Warden Jr.	89,948	47.1%
Total votes		190,972	100.0%
Democratic hold			

=== 1974 ===
United States House of Representatives elections, 1974
Party	Candidate	Votes	%
Democratic	Ron Dellums (Incumbent)	93,106	56.6%
Republican	Jack Redden	65,432	39.6%
American Independent	John Holland	6,324	3.8%
Total votes		164,862	100.0%
Democratic hold			

=== 1976 ===
United States House of Representatives elections, 1976
Party	Candidate	Votes	%
Democratic	Ron Dellums (Incumbent)	122,342	62.1%
Republican	Philip Stiles Breck Jr.	68,374	34.7%
Peace and Freedom	Robert J. Evans	6,238	3.2%
Total votes		196,954	100.0%
Democratic hold			

=== 1978 ===
United States House of Representatives elections, 1978
Party	Candidate	Votes	%
Democratic	Ron Dellums (Incumbent)	94,824	57.4%
Republican	Charles V. Hughes	70,481	42.6%
Total votes		165,305	100.0%
Democratic hold			

=== 1980 ===
United States House of Representatives elections, 1980
Party	Candidate	Votes	%
Democratic	Ron Dellums (Incumbent)	108,380	55.5%
Republican	Charles V. Hughes	76,580	39.2%
Libertarian	Tod Mikuriya	10,465	5.4%
Total votes		195,425	100.0%
Democratic hold			

=== 1982 ===
United States House of Representatives elections, 1982
Party	Candidate	Votes	%
Democratic	Ron Dellums (Incumbent)	121,537	55.9%
Republican	Claude B. Hutchinson Jr.	95,694	44.1%
Total votes		217,231	100.0%
Democratic hold			

=== 1984 ===
United States House of Representatives elections, 1984
Party	Candidate	Votes	%
Democratic	Ron Dellums (Incumbent)	144,316	60.3%
Republican	Charles Connor	94,907	39.7%
Total votes		239,223	100.0%
Democratic hold			

=== 1986 ===
United States House of Representatives elections, 1986
Party	Candidate	Votes	%
Democratic	Ron Dellums (Incumbent)	121,790	60.0%
Republican	Steven Eigenberg	76,850	37.9%
Peace and Freedom	Lawrence R. Manuel	4,295	2.1%
Total votes		202,935	100.0%
Democratic hold			

=== 1988 ===
United States House of Representatives elections, 1988
Party	Candidate	Votes	%
Democratic	Ron Dellums (Incumbent)	163,221	66.6%
Republican	John J. Cuddihy Jr.	76,531	31.2%
Peace and Freedom	Tom Condit	5,444	2.2%
Total votes		245,196	100.0%
Democratic hold			

=== 1990 ===
United States House of Representatives elections, 1990
Party	Candidate	Votes	%
Democratic	Ron Dellums (Incumbent)	119,645	61.3%
Republican	Barbara Galewski	75,544	38.7%
Total votes		195,189	100.0%
Democratic hold			

=== 1992 ===
United States House of Representatives elections, 1992
Party	Candidate	Votes	%
Democratic	Nancy Pelosi (Incumbent)	191,906	82.5%
Republican	Marc Wolin	25,693	11.0%
Peace and Freedom	Cesar G. Cadabes	7,572	3.3%
Libertarian	James R. Elwood	7,511	3.2%
No party	Goldwater (write-in)	9	0.0%
Total votes		222,691	100.0%
Democratic hold			

=== 1994 ===
United States House of Representatives elections, 1994
Party	Candidate	Votes	%
Democratic	Nancy Pelosi (Incumbent)	137,642	81.85%
Republican	Elsa C. Cheung	30,528	18.15%
No party	Bowman (write-in)	1	0.00%
Total votes		168,171	100.0%
Democratic hold			

=== 1996 ===
United States House of Representatives elections, 1996
Party	Candidate	Votes	%
Democratic	Nancy Pelosi (Incumbent)	175,216	84.4%
Republican	Justin Raimondo	25,739	12.4%
Natural Law	David Smithstein	6,783	3.2%
Republican	Ed Murray (write-in)	22	0.0%
Total votes		207,760	100.0%
Democratic hold			

=== 1998 ===
United States House of Representatives elections, 1998
Party	Candidate	Votes	%
Democratic	Nancy Pelosi (Incumbent)	148,027	85.83%
Republican	David J. Martz	20,781	12.05%
Natural Law	David Smithstein	6,783	2.12%
Total votes		175,591	100.0%
Democratic hold			

=== 2000 ===
2000 United States House of Representatives elections in California
Party	Candidate	Votes	%
Democratic	Nancy Pelosi (Incumbent)	181,847	84.5%
Republican	Adam Sparks	25,298	11.7%
Libertarian	Erik Bauman	5,645	2.6%
Natural Law	David Smithstein	2,638	1.2%
Total votes		215,428	100.0%
Democratic hold			

=== 2002 ===
2002 United States House of Representatives elections in California
Party	Candidate	Votes	%
Democratic	Nancy Pelosi (Incumbent)	127,684	79.6%
Republican	G. Michael German	20,063	12.6%
Green	Jay Pond	10,033	6.2%
Libertarian	Ira Spivack	2,659	1.6%
Socialist Workers	Deborah Liatos (write-in)	2	0.0%
Total votes		160,441	100.0%
Democratic hold			

=== 2004 ===
2004 United States House of Representatives elections in California
Party	Candidate	Votes	%
Democratic	Nancy Pelosi (Incumbent)	224,017	83.0%
Republican	Jennifer Depalma	31,074	11.5%
Green	Leilani Dowell	9,527	3.5%
Green	Terry Baum (write-in)	5,446	2.0%
Total votes		270,064	100.0%
Democratic hold			

=== 2006 ===
2006 United States House of Representatives elections in California
Party	Candidate	Votes	%
Democratic	Nancy Pelosi (Incumbent)	148,435	80.4%
Republican	Mike DeNunzio	19,800	10.8%
Green	Krissy Keefer	13,653	7.4%
Libertarian	Philip Zimt Berg	2,751	1.4%
Total votes		184,639	100.0%
Democratic hold			

=== 2008 ===
2008 United States House of Representatives elections in California
Party	Candidate	Votes	%
Democratic	Nancy Pelosi (Incumbent)	204,996	71.7%
Independent	Cindy Sheehan	46,118	16.1%
Republican	Dana Walsh	27,614	9.7%
Libertarian	Philip Zimt Berg	6,504	2.3%
Total votes		285,247	100.0%
Democratic hold			

=== 2010 ===
2010 United States House of Representatives elections in California
Party	Candidate	Votes	%
Democratic	Nancy Pelosi (Incumbent)	167,957	80%
Republican	John Dennis	31,711	15%
Peace and Freedom	Gloria La Riva	5,161	3%
Libertarian	Philip Berg	4,843	2%
Total votes		209,672	100%
Democratic hold			

=== 2012 ===
United States House of Representatives elections, 2012
Party	Candidate	Votes	%
Republican	Paul Cook	103,093	57.4%
Republican	Gregg Imus	76,551	42.6%
Total votes		179,644	100.0%
Republican hold			

=== 2014 ===
United States House of Representatives elections, 2014
Party	Candidate	Votes	%
Republican	Paul Cook (Incumbent)	77,480	67.6%
Democratic	Bob Conaway	37,056	32.4%
Total votes		114,536	100.0%
Republican hold			

=== 2016 ===
United States House of Representatives elections, 2016
Party	Candidate	Votes	%
Republican	Paul Cook (Incumbent)	136,972	62.3%
Democratic	Rita Ramirez	83,035	37.7%
Total votes		220,007	100.0%
Republican hold			

=== 2018 ===
2018 United States House of Representatives elections in California
Party	Candidate	Votes	%
Republican	Paul Cook	102,415	60.0%
Republican	Tim Donnelly	68,370	40.0%
Total votes		170,785	100.0%
Republican hold			

=== 2020 ===
2020 United States House of Representatives elections in California
Party	Candidate	Votes	%
Republican	Jay Obernolte	158,711	56.1%
Democratic	Christine Bubser	124,400	43.9%
Total votes		283,111	100%
Republican hold			

=== 2022 ===
2022 United States House of Representatives elections in California
Party	Candidate	Votes	%
Democratic	John Garamendi (incumbent)	145,501	75.7%
Republican	Rudy Recile	46,634	24.3%
Total votes		192,135	100%
Democratic hold			

=== 2024 ===
2024 United States House of Representatives elections in California
Party	Candidate	Votes	%
Democratic	John Garamendi (incumbent)	201,962	74.0%
Republican	Rudy Recile	71,068	26.0%
Total votes		273,030	100%
Democratic hold			

== See also ==
- List of United States congressional districts
- California's congressional districts

U.S. House of Representatives
Preceded by Illinois's 14th congressional district	Home district of the speaker January 4, 2007 – January 3, 2011	Succeeded by Ohio's 8th congressional district
