= Hadley Cantril =

American psychologist (1906–1969)

Albert Hadley Cantril, Jr.
- Born: 16 June 1906; Hyrum, Utah, U.S.
- Died: 28 May 1969 (aged 62)
- Education: Dartmouth College; Harvard University
- Occupations: Psychologist, researcher
- Spouse: Mavis L. Cantril

Albert Hadley Cantril, Jr. (16 June 1906 – 28 May 1969) was an American psychologist from Princeton University, who expanded the scope of the field.

Cantril made "major contributions in psychology of propaganda; public opinion research; applications of psychology and psychological research to national policy, international understanding, and communication; developmental psychology; psychology of social movements; measurement and scaling; humanistic psychology; the psychology of perception; and, basic to all of them, the analysis of human behavior from the transactional point of view." His influence is felt in education, law, philosophy, politics and psychiatry.

"Hadley Cantril, Princeton psychologist, is representative of most quantitative scholars of social influence who, while holding their political commitments close to the vest, nevertheless saw themselves clearly in the ranks of reformers loosely attached to the progressive movement…. Focus on social process and a psychological view of people put the academic scientists of society in a frame of mind to assume the polis languished chiefly because of inaction on the part of enlightened administrators."

== Biography ==
Cantril was born in Hyrum, Utah in 1906 and first studied at Dartmouth College, graduating Bachelor of Science in 1928. He did graduate study in Munich and Berlin, then studied at Harvard graduating with Doctor of Philosophy in psychology in 1931. He was hired as an instructor by Dartmouth and joined the Princeton University faculty in 1936. The next year he became president of the Institute for Propaganda Analysis and one of the founding editors of Public Opinion Quarterly. Later he became chairman of the Princeton University Department of Psychology.

Cantril was a member of the Princeton Radio Research Project. The Project looked at the reaction to Orson Welles' radio drama The War of the Worlds and published a study accenting the public's disturbance.

In 1940 he served as a consultant to the Office of the Coordinator of Inter-American Affairs.

Cantril's later psychological work included collaboration with Adelbert Ames, Jr. developing a transactional method for studying human perception, as well as other research in humanistic psychology.

== Public opinion research ==
Though trained as a psychologist, Cantril's most important work concerned the then-new topic of public opinion research. Influenced initially by the success of George Gallup and Elmo Roper during the 1936 presidential election, Cantril sought to apply their systematic polling technique to academic social psychology. While Cantril was department chairman he became a presidential advisor:

Cantril's small-scale program at Princeton became more extensive in September 1940 when Nelson Rockefeller, FDR's Coordinator of Inter-American Affairs, asked the Princeton psychologist to "set up mechanisms which would gauge public opinion in Latin America." In cooperation with Gallup, and with funds from the Office of Emergency Management, Cantril established an ostensibly independent research organization, American Social Surveys. He recruited his friend Leonard Doob, and another researcher Lloyd Free, to analyse Nazi propaganda coming into Latin America. Through Rockefeller's office, the results of Cantril's program were brought to the attention of FDR. The president asked Cantril to monitor public sentiment on avoiding war versus aiding Britain. Cantril duly kept tabs on views about aiding England and on the public's willingness to change U.S. neutrality laws in favor of Britain.

In 1942 Cantril conducted a small-sample survey of Vichy officials in Morocco, prior to Operation Torch, that revealed the intensity of the anti-British sentiment of the French forces there. This information influenced the disposition of forces during the operation, with American troops landing near Casablanca and mixed forces at Oran and Algiers. According to George Gallup, "On the basis of his opinion studies, [Cantril] advised Presidents Roosevelt, Eisenhower, and Kennedy at critical points in history. Judged by subsequent events his advice was exceptionally sound."

In 1955 he and Lloyd Free founded the Institute for International Social Research (IISR). The IISR was often asked by United States government agencies to conduct small-sample public opinion polls in foreign countries. Notably, Cantril and Free conducted a poll of Cuba during 1960 demonstrating great support for Fidel Castro, which was overlooked during the presidential transition between Eisenhower and Kennedy and read only after the Bay of Pigs Invasion fiasco.

Cantril's most-cited work is The Pattern of Human Concerns, notable for the development of the self-anchoring scale (also known as "Cantril's Ladder"). Cantril and Free also first discovered the paradox that American voters tend to oppose "big government" in general while supporting many specific liberal social programs.

During the late 1950s, Cantril served on the International Objectives and Strategies panel of the Rockefeller Brothers Fund's Special Studies Project.

== Works ==
- 1934: Social Psychology of Everyday Life
- 1935:(with Gordon Allport) Psychology of Radio from Internet Archive
- 1939: Industrial Conflict: a Psychological Interpretation,
- 1940: The Invasion from Mars, a Study in the Psychology of Panic
- 1940: America Faces the War, a Study in Public Opinion
- 1941: Psychology of Social Movements from HathiTrust
- 1944: Gauging Public Opinion, Princeton University Press, via Internet Archive
- 1947: (with Muzafer Sherif) Psychology of ego-involvements : social attitudes & identifications via HathiTrust
- 1950: The "Why" of Man's Experience
- 1950: Tensions that cause wars (a report for UNESCO)
- 1951: (with Mildred Strunk) Public Opinion, 1935–1946, polls from the USA, Europe and Canada, via Internet Archive
- 1953: (with William Buchanan) How Nations See Each Other, a study in public opinion
- 1954: (with William H. Ittelson) Perception: a Transactional Approach
- 1956: On Understanding the French Left
- 1957 The Nature of Faith via archive.org
- 1958: Faith, Hope, and Heresy: the Psychology of the Protest Voter via HathiTrust
- 1958: Politics of Despair via HathiTrust
- 1959: introduction to book 6 allies and a neutral
- 1960: Reflections on the Human Venture
- 1960: Soviet Leaders and Mastery over Man
- 1961: Human Nature and Political Systems
- 1965: Pattern of Human Concerns
- 1967: (with L. A. Free) Political beliefs of Americans; a study of public opinion
- 1967: The Human Dimension: Experiences in Policy Research
- 1988: (Albert H. Cantril, editor) Psychology, Humanism, and Scientific Inquiry: the Selected Essays of Hadley Cantril
