= Princeton Neuroscience Institute =

US research center

- Type: Private
- Established: 2004
- Parent institution: Princeton University
- Director: Mala Murthy
- Faculty: 32 faculty members (2018-2019)
- Students: 68 (2018-2019)
- Location: Princeton, New Jersey, United States

The Princeton Neuroscience Institute (PNI) is a center for neuroscience research at Princeton University. Founded in the spring of 2004, the PNI serves as a "stimulus for teaching and research in neuroscience and related fields" and "places particular emphasis on the close connection between theory, modeling, and experimentation using the most advanced technologies." It often partners with Princeton University's departments of Psychology and Molecular Biology.

== History ==
=== Founding ===
The Princeton Neuroscience Institute was created in 2004 under the leadership of psychology professor Jonathan D. Cohen and molecular biology professor David Tank, who served as Co-Directors of the PNI until 2023. Cohen joined Princeton in 1998 and specializes in cognitive neuroscience. He is the scientific director of the Scully Center for the Neuroscience of Mind and Behavior within the PNI. He has also directed the undergraduate certificate program in neuroscience since 2001. Cohen earned his M.D. from the University of Pennsylvania and a Ph.D. in Cognitive Psychology from Carnegie Mellon University. He did an internship and his residency in psychiatry at Stanford University School of Medicine.

Tank joined Princeton's faculty in 2001, where he specializes in physics-based measurement techniques to study the nervous system. Prior to Princeton, he was a researcher at Bell Laboratories from 1983 to 2001. He earned his Ph.D. in Physics from Cornell University is currently a member of the National Academy of Sciences.

=== Scully Hall ===
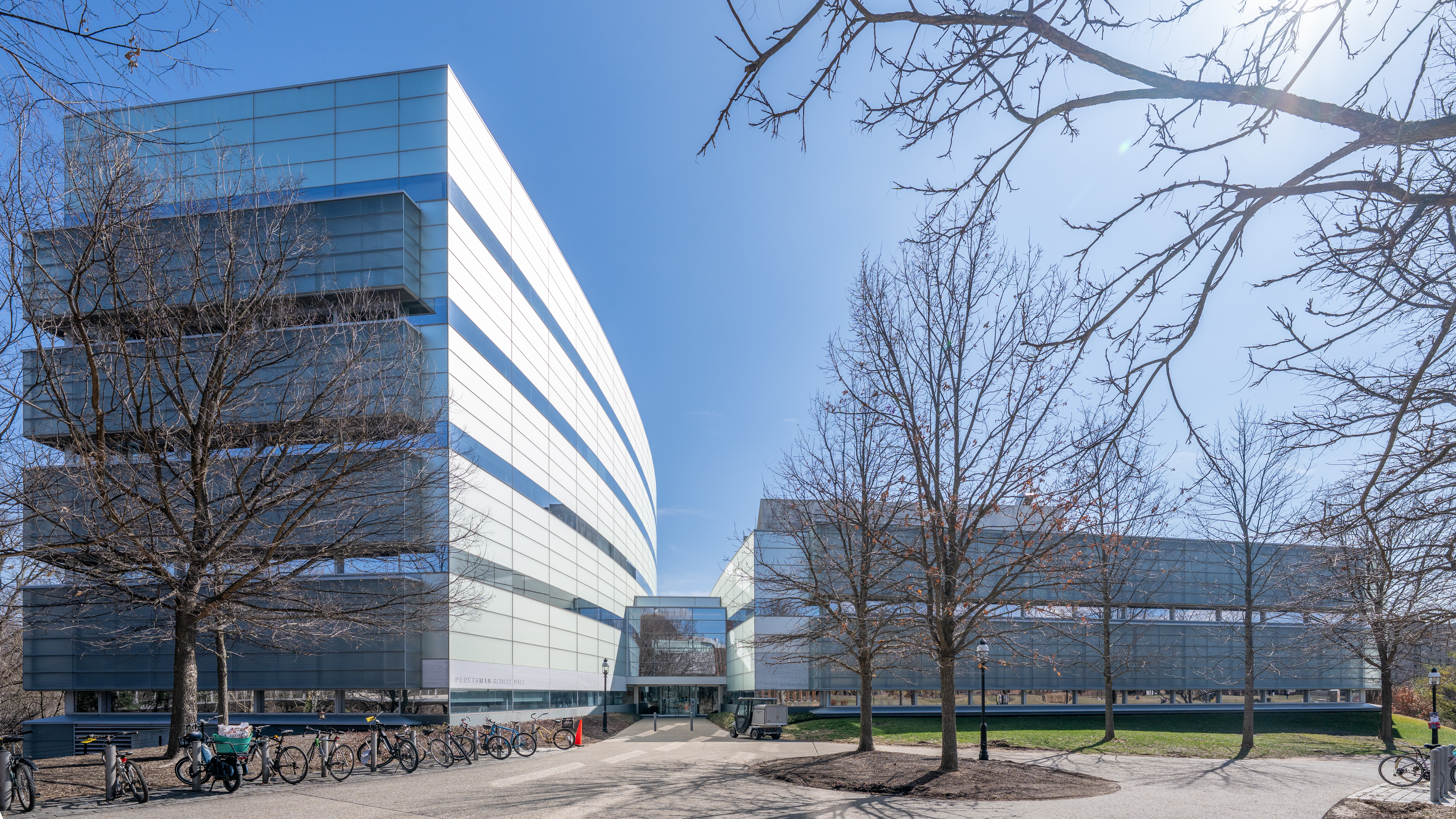
Scully Hall (2026)

Moneo Arquitecto, an international architecture and design firm, was commissioned to design the new neuroscience and psychology buildings in 2006. The building is 24,800 square feet, and was designed by Rafael Moneo to meet LEED Silver certification.

== Academics ==
=== Undergraduate ===
At the undergraduate level, the PNI directs both the Undergraduate Concentration in Neuroscience (major) and the Undergraduate Certificate in Neuroscience (minor). Both are designed for undergraduate students interested in a wide variety of fields, such as molecular biology, psychology, chemistry, and applied mathematics. Exceptional undergraduate students may qualify for a number of research awards, including the James M. Shapiro ’80 Fund for Undergraduate Research in Neuroscience, the Nancy J. Newman, MD ’78 & Valerie Biousse, MD Senior Thesis Research Fund for Neuroscience, and the Sanda & Jeremiah Lambert ’55 Fund for Undergraduate Neuroscience, in Honor of Clare Lambert ’08 and Hilary Lambert ‘10.

=== Graduate ===
The graduate program in Neuroscience is designed to prepare students for careers as in academia or in industry. Students may select one of the following areas of research: systems and circuits, human neuroscience, or theory and computation. The PNI also offers a joint graduate degree program in neuroscience, which is designed for students who are interested in an interdisciplinary approach to neuroscience. Prospective applicants may work in a number of other related departments, including Psychology, Molecular Biology, or Philosophy. Princeton is also one of the few universities in the country to offer a graduate and postdoctoral program in Quantitative and Computational Neuroscientists.

== Research ==
Research at the PNI spans the disciplines of molecular, cellular, systems, and cognitive neuroscience. The PNI is also especially dedicated to computational research. The PNI directs a number of programs and projects, including the Intel Labs and PNI Project, Rutgers-Princeton Center for Computational Cognitive Neuropsychiatry, and the International Brain Lab (IBL).

=== Centers and Initiatives ===
- Bezos Center for Neural Circuit Dynamics
- The McDonnell Center for Systems Neuroscience
- The Regina and John Scully '66 Center for the Neuroscience of Mind and Behavior

The Bezos Center for Neural Circuit Dynamics was founded by Jeff and MacKenzie Bezos to focus on the development of microscopy imaging techniques for measuring neural circuit dynamics in the functioning brain. The Center hosts a number of custom-built optical instrumentation for large-scale monitoring and optogenetic perturbation of neural activity. The McDonnell Center for Systems Neuroscience specializes on neural coding and dynamics. James McDonnell III, a former University trustee, established the program in 2007. Founded in 2007, the Regina and John Scully '66 Center for the Neuroscience of Mind and Behavior analyzes how physical mechanisms of the brain give rise to the functions of the mind.

== See also ==
- History of psychology
