= George P. Miller =

American politician (1891–1982)

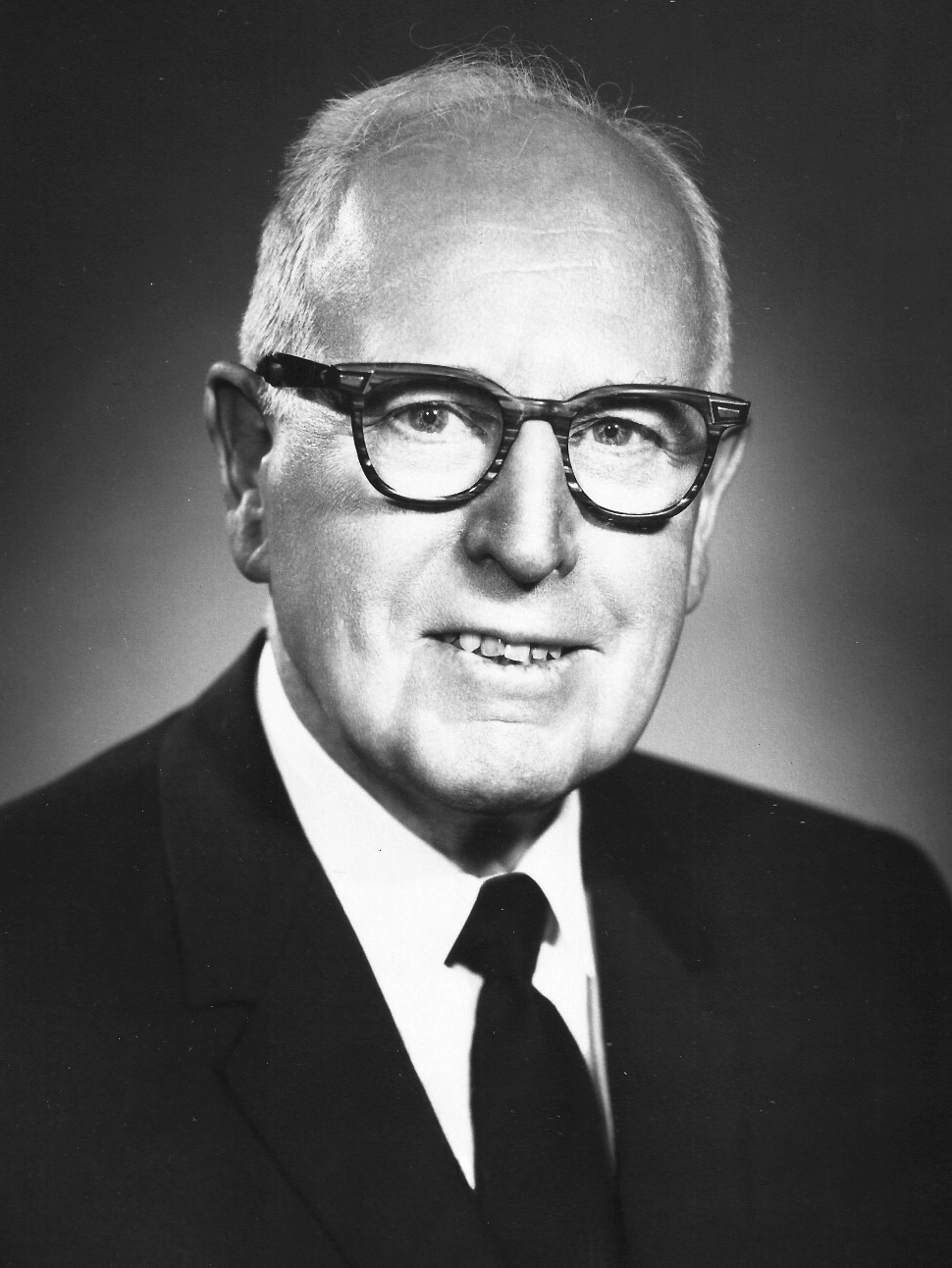
- Official portrait, 1963

Chair of the House Science Committee
- In office January 3, 1961 – January 3, 1973
- Preceded by: Overton Brooks
- Succeeded by: Olin E. Teague

Member of the U.S. House of Representatives from California
- In office January 3, 1945 – January 3, 1973
- Preceded by: Albert E. Carter
- Succeeded by: Pete Stark
- Constituency: 6th district (1945–1953); 8th district (1953–1973)

Member of the California State Assembly from the 14th district
- In office January 4, 1937 – January 6, 1941
- Preceded by: Charles J. Wagner
- Succeeded by: Randal F. Dickey

Personal details
- Born: George Paul Miller; January 15, 1891 San Francisco, California, U.S.
- Died: December 29, 1982 (aged 91) Alameda, California, U.S.
- Resting place: San Francisco National Cemetery
- Party: Democratic
- Spouse: Esther M. Perkins (m. 1927)
- Children: 1
- Education: Saint Mary's College of California

Military service
- Allegiance: United States of America
- Branch/service: 346th Field Artillery
- Years of service: 1917–1919
- Rank: Lieutenant
- Battles/wars: World War I

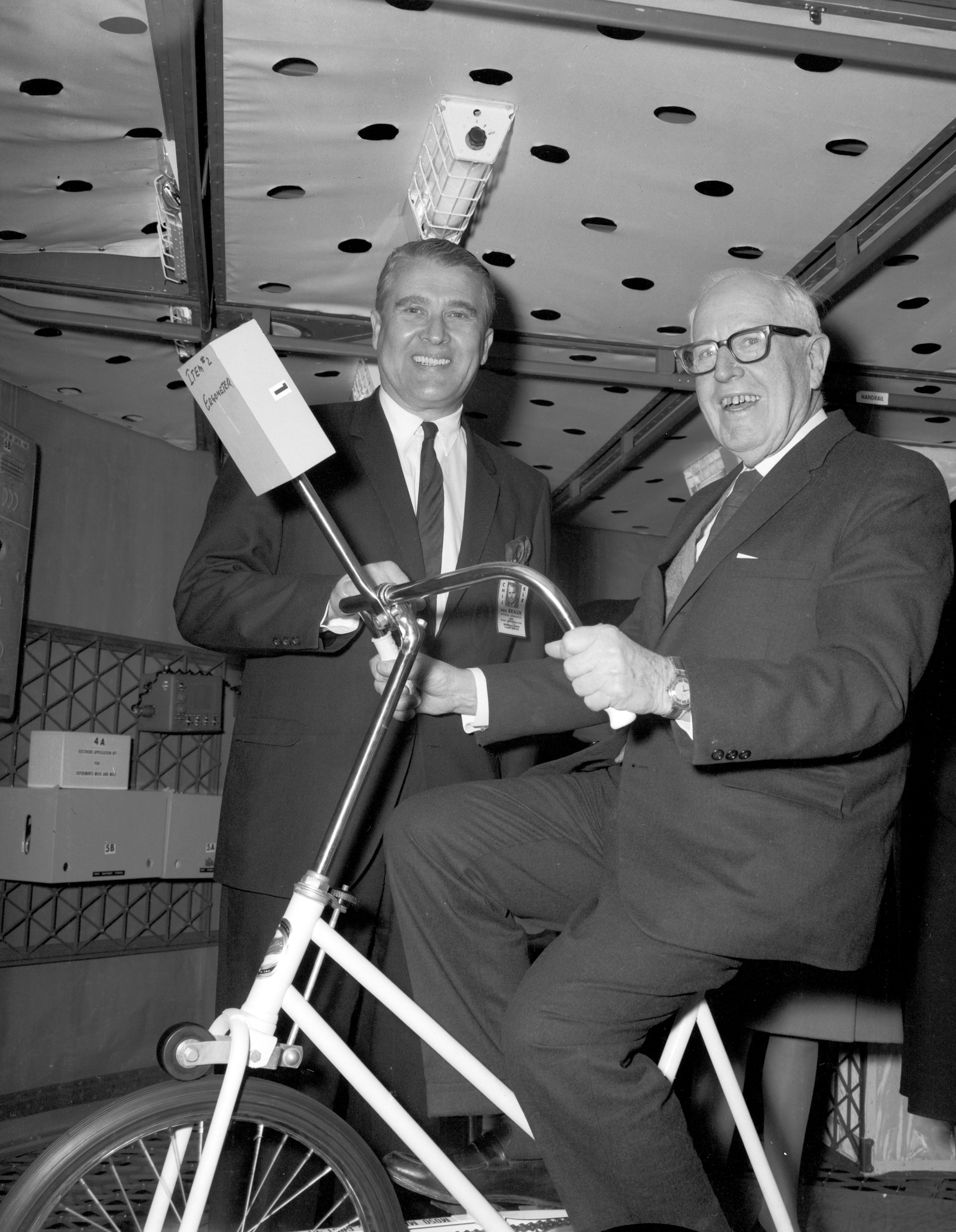
During a 1968 visit to the Marshall Space Flight Center, the House Committee on Science and Astronautics toured the S-IVB workshop. Pictured here are Wernher von Braun (standing) and Congressman Miller (sitting on the ergometer bicycle) inside the workshop.

George Paul Miller (January 15, 1891 – December 29, 1982) was an American veteran of World War I who served 14 terms as a U.S. representative from California from 1945 to 1973.

== Early life ==
George Paul Miller was born in San Francisco, on January 15, 1891. His father was a dredger captain on the Sacramento River. Miller attended public and private schools. He graduated from Saint Mary's College of California in 1912 with a degree in civil engineering.

== Career ==
=== Early career ===
Miller worked as a civil engineer from 1912 to 1917. During the First World War, he served as a lieutenant in the 36th Infantry Division and 346th Field Artillery from 1917 to 1919. After serving as member of the United States Veterans' Bureau from 1921 to 1925, Miller resumed activities as a civil engineer. He was also co-owner of a travel agency in San Francisco, but it failed during the Great Depression. He was a street sweeper in Alameda during the depression.

=== Political career ===
He volunteered in the drive to repeal Prohibition and was elected president of the Alameda County Non-partisan League, a group advocating for the consolidation of Oakland County and Alameda County after the formation of San Francisco's government. He then served as member of the California State Assembly from 1937 to 1941. Miller then ran for a seat on the Alameda County Board of Supervisors, but was unsuccessful. He was executive secretary to the California Division of Fish and Game from 1942 to 1944.

Miller was elected as a Democrat to the 79th and to the thirteen succeeding Congresses (January 3, 1945 – January 3, 1973). He served as chairman of the Oceanography Committee, a subcommittee of the Merchant Marine and Fisheries Committee. He later served as chairman of the Committee on Science and Astronautics (87th through 92nd Congresses), after the death of Overton Brooks in 1961. He was an unsuccessful candidate for renomination in 1972 to the 93rd Congress, defeated in the Democratic primary by Pete Stark.

He was an early supporter for the development of solar power systems.

== Personal life ==
Miller married Esther M. Perkins of Overton, Nebraska, in 1927. They had one daughter: Ann.

== Death ==
Miller was a resident of Alameda, California, until his death there on December 29, 1982. He was interred in San Francisco National Cemetery in the Presidio of San Francisco, California.

== Legacy ==
The George Miller Memorial Scholarship at Saint Mary's College and the George P. Miller Fund for Special Education at the Alameda Unified School District were established in his honor.

== Electoral history ==
George P. Miller electoral history

1944 United States House of Representatives elections
Party	Candidate	Votes	%
Democratic	George Paul Miller	104,441	52
Republican	Albert E. Carter (Incumbent)	96,395	48
Total votes		200,836	100.0
Democratic gain from Republican			

1946 United States House of Representatives elections
Party	Candidate	Votes	%
Democratic	George P. Miller (Incumbent)	118,548	100.0
Democratic hold			

1948 United States House of Representatives elections
Party	Candidate	Votes	%
Democratic	George P. Miller (Incumbent)	194,985	100.0
Democratic hold			

1950 United States House of Representatives elections
Party	Candidate	Votes	%
Democratic	George P. Miller (Incumbent)	192,342	100.0
Democratic hold			

United States House of Representatives elections, 1952
Party	Candidate	Votes	%
Democratic	George P. Miller (Incumbent)	156,445	100.0%
Democratic hold			

United States House of Representatives elections, 1954
Party	Candidate	Votes	%
Democratic	George P. Miller (Incumbent)	101,803	65.4%
Republican	Jessie M. Ritchie	53,869	34.6%
Total votes		155,672	100.0%
Democratic hold			

United States House of Representatives elections, 1956
Party	Candidate	Votes	%
Democratic	George P. Miller (Incumbent)	136,720	65.6%
Republican	Robert Lee Watkins	71,700	34.4%
Total votes		208,420	100.0%
Democratic hold			

United States House of Representatives elections, 1958
Party	Candidate	Votes	%
Democratic	George P. Miller (Incumbent)	181,437	100.0%
Democratic hold			

United States House of Representatives elections, 1960
Party	Candidate	Votes	%
Democratic	George P. Miller (Incumbent)	152,476	62%
Republican	Robert E. Hannon	93,403	38%
Total votes		245,879	100%
Democratic hold			

United States House of Representatives elections, 1962
Party	Candidate	Votes	%
Democratic	George P. Miller (Incumbent)	97,014	72.5%
Republican	Harold Petersen	36,810	27.5%
Total votes		133,824	100.0%
Democratic hold			

United States House of Representatives elections, 1964
Party	Candidate	Votes	%
Democratic	George P. Miller (Incumbent)	108,771	70.3%
Republican	Donald E. McKay	46,063	29.7%
Total votes		154,834	100.0%
Democratic hold			

United States House of Representatives elections, 1966
Party	Candidate	Votes	%
Democratic	George P. Miller (Incumbent)	92,263	65.4%
Republican	Raymond P. Britton	48,727	34.6%
Total votes		140,990	100.0%
Democratic hold			

United States House of Representatives elections, 1968
Party	Candidate	Votes	%
Democratic	George P. Miller (Incumbent)	104,231	64%
Republican	Raymond P. Britton	58,584	36%
Total votes		162,815	100%
Democratic hold			

United States House of Representatives elections, 1970
Party	Candidate	Votes	%
Democratic	George P. Miller (Incumbent)	104,311	69%
Republican	Michael A. Crane	46,872	31%
Total votes		151,183	100%
Democratic hold			

U.S. House of Representatives
Preceded by Albert E. Carter	Member of the U.S. House of Representatives from California's 6th congressional district 1945–1953	Succeeded by Robert Condon
Preceded by Jack Z. Anderson	Member of the U.S. House of Representatives from California's 8th congressional district 1953–1973	Succeeded by Pete Stark
