= Jean-Christophe Bailly =

French writer, poet and playwright

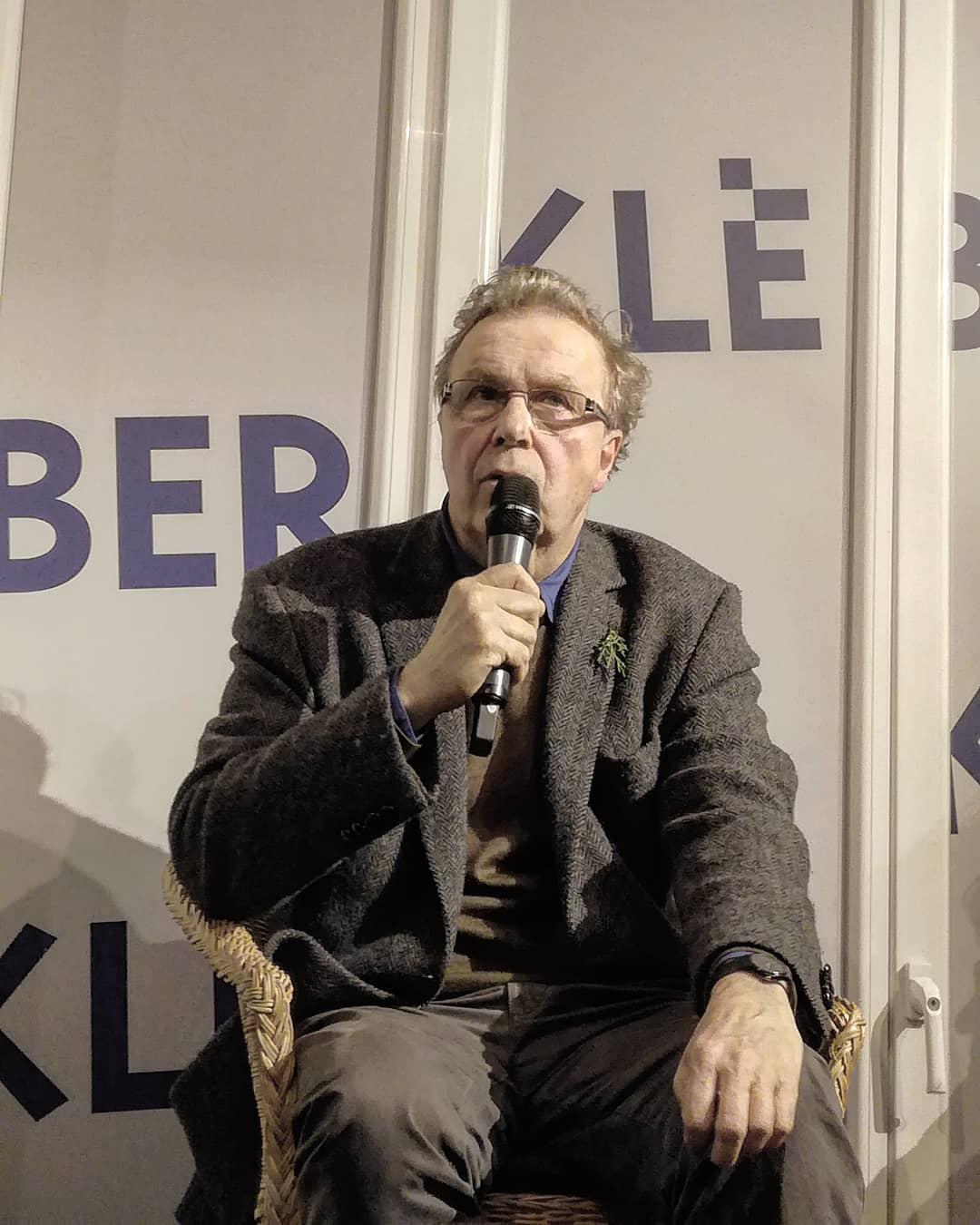
- Christophe Bailly
- Born: May 3, 1949 (age 77); Paris, France
- Education: Doctorate in philosophy
- Occupations: Writer, poet, playwright
- Writing career
- Language: French
- Notable works: Tuiles détachées, Le Dépaysement
- Notable awards: Prix Décembre (2011)

Jean-Christophe Bailly (French pronunciation: [ʒɑ̃ kʁistɔf baji]; 3 May 1949) is a French writer, poet and playwright. Born in Paris, he has written on painting and photography and has been active in contemporary art.

== Biography ==
Bailly was born in Paris. Very early on, he decided to devote himself to writing. His book Tuiles detachées explains this decision, as well as several important steps for the formation of his style. Close to surrealism when he entered literature, he moved away from it. His thought constitutes the modern continuity of certain ideas of German romanticism: the idea of a sense without borders and moving forms, in the spirit of what Novalis calls the "Encyclopedia".

He founded and directed the magazines Fin de siècle (with Serge Sautreau for four issues between 1974 and 1976) and Aléa (for nine issues between 1981 and 1989). He also directed the series "Détroits" at Éditions Christian Bourgois (with Michel Deutsch and Philippe Lacoue-Labarthe) and "35-37" at Hazan.

A holder of a doctorate degree in philosophy, Bailly has been teaching at the École nationale supérieure de la nature et du paysage in Blois, of which he has been directing the publication Les Cahiers de l’École de Blois since 2003.

== Works ==
=== Essays ===
- 1968: Célébration de la boule, Le Jas-du-Revest-Saint-Martin, Robert Morel, fascicule (47 p.)
- 1971: Au-delà du langage : essai sur Benjamin Péret, Éric Losfeld
- 1973: Jean-Pierre Duprey, Éditions Seghers
- 1976: La Légende dispersée : Anthologie du romantisme allemand, 10/18
- 1978: Wozu ? : à quoi bon des poètes en un temps de manque ? (codirected with Henri-Alexis Baatsch), Le Soleil Noir
- 1980: Le Vingt janvier, Bourgois
- 1989: Le Paradis du sens, Bourgois
- 1990: L’Atelier bleu, La Pionnière
- 1991: La Fin de l’hymne, Bourgois
- 1991: La Comparution (politique à venir) (with Jean-Luc Nancy), Bourgois
- 1992: La Ville à l’œuvre, Bertoin
- 1993: Adieu : essai sur la mort des dieux, La Tour-d'Aigues, Éditions de l'Aube
- 1997: Le Propre du langage, voyages au pays des noms communs, Paris, Éditions du Seuil
- 2000: Panoramiques, Bourgois
- 2004: Le Pays des animots, Paris, Bayard Presse
- 2005: Le Champ mimétique, Seuil, 2005
- 2006: Rimbaud parti (with Jacqueline Salmon), Paris, Éditions Marval
- 2007: Le Versant animal, Bayard
- 2008: L’Instant et son ombre, Seuil
- 2009: Le Visible est le caché, Paris, Le Promeneur
- 2009: Le Temps fixé, Bayard
- 2011: La Véridiction sur Philippe Lacoue-Labarthe, Bourgois
- 2012: "L'action solitaire du poème", in Toi aussi tu as des armes - Poésie et politique, collective work, Paris, La Fabrique éditions, ISBN 978-2-35872-025-0
- 2013: Le Parti pris des animaux, Seuil
- 2013: La Phrase urbaine, Seuil
- 2015: L’Élargissement du poème, Bourgois, series "Détroits"

=== Narratives ===
- 1985: Beau fixe, Paris, Bourgois
- 1990: Phèdre en Inde, Paris, Plon
- 1992: Description d'Olonne, Bourgois, Prix France Culture
- 1996: Le Maître du montage (followed by l`Énigme by Jacques Monory), Nantes, Joca seria
- 2004: Tuiles détachées, Paris, Mercure de France
- 2010: Dans l'étendu (Colombie-Argentine), Lyon, Fage
- 2011: Le Dépaysement. Voyages en France, Le Seuil - Prix Décembre 2011.

=== Texts on art ===
- 1976: Max Ernst : apprentissage, énigme, apologie (with Henri-Alexis Baatsch and Alain Jouffroy), Bourgois and Éditions étrangères
- 1977: Hommage à Caspar David Friedrich (with Jacques Monory), Bourgois
- 1979: Monory, Paris, Maeght
- 1984: Duchamp, Paris, Éditions Hazan
- 1988: Piotr Kowalski, Hazan
- 1989: Mine de rien, Paris, Galerie de France
- 1992: Regarder la peinture, Hazan
- 1993: Kurt Schwitters, Hazan
- 1997: L'Apostrophe muette : essai sur les portraits du Fayoum, Hazan
- 2000: Jacques Monory, Neuchâtel, Ides et calendes
- 2005: Gilles Aillaud, Marseille, André Dimanche
- 2007: L'Atelier infini: 30.000 ans de peinture, Hazan
- 2011: Monory photographe, catalogue Galerie Rue Visconti, Paris
- 2012: Bernard Moninot, André Dimanche
- 2013: Dead Cities, Guillaume Greff, Kaiserin Editions, Reykjavík
- 2014: Col Treno, photographs by Bernard Plossu, Éditions Argol, ISBN 978-2-37069-002-9

=== Poetry ===
- 1973: Les îles de la Sonde, in De la déception pure, manifeste froid (with Yves Buin, Serge Sautreau, and André Velter), Paris, 10/18
- 1973: L'Astrolabe dans la passe des Français, Seghers
- 1973: Le Gramme des sursauts, Paris, Éditions étrangères
- 1975: Défaire le vide, Éditions étrangères et Bourgois
- 1979: L'Étoilement, Montpellier, Éditions Fata Morgana
- 1983: Per modo di vestigio (with Hervé Bordas), Copal
- 1985: Pluie douce (with Jan Voss), Marseille, André Dimanche
- 1991: L'Oiseau Nyiro, Geneva, La Dogana
- 1999: Blanc sur noir, Bordeaux, William Blake and Co.
- 2000: Basse continue, Seuil

=== Theatre ===
- 1983: Les Céphéides, Bourgois
- 1987: Le Régent, Bourgois
- 1989: La Medesima strada (with Gilles Aillaud and K. M. Grüber), Bourgois
- 1992: Pandora, Bourgois
- 1995: Lumières (with M. Deutsch, J.-F. Duroure and G. Lavaudant), Bourgois
- 2003: El Pelele, Bourgois
- 2003: Poursuites, Bourgois
- 2005: Villeggiatura (with Serge Valletti), Nantes, L'Atalante (maison d'édition)
- 2006: Une nuit à la bibliothèque followed by Fuochi sparsi, Bourgois

== Bibliography ==
- Bailly, Jean-Christophe (with Jean-Marc Besse, Philippe Grand, and Gilles Palsky). (2019): An Atlas of Geographical Wonders. From Mountaintops to Riverbeds. New York, Princeton Architectural Press, 2019, ISBN 9781616898236.
- Jean-Christophe Bailly, Europe, n° 1046, June 2016 : texts by Jean-Christophe Bailly, contributions de Henri-Alexis Baatsch, Jacques Bonnaffé, Stéphane Bouquet, Laurent Demanze, Michel Deutsch, Brigitte Ferrato-Combe, Fabrice Gabriel, Marielle Macé, Jean-Pierre Montier, Jean-Luc Nancy, Federico Nicolao, Pierre Pachet, Muriel Pic, Nathalie Piégay, Catherine Robert, Nina Rocipon, Michel Sandras, Patrick Talbot, Gilbert Vaudey.
