= Arthur M. Free =

American politician (1879–1953)

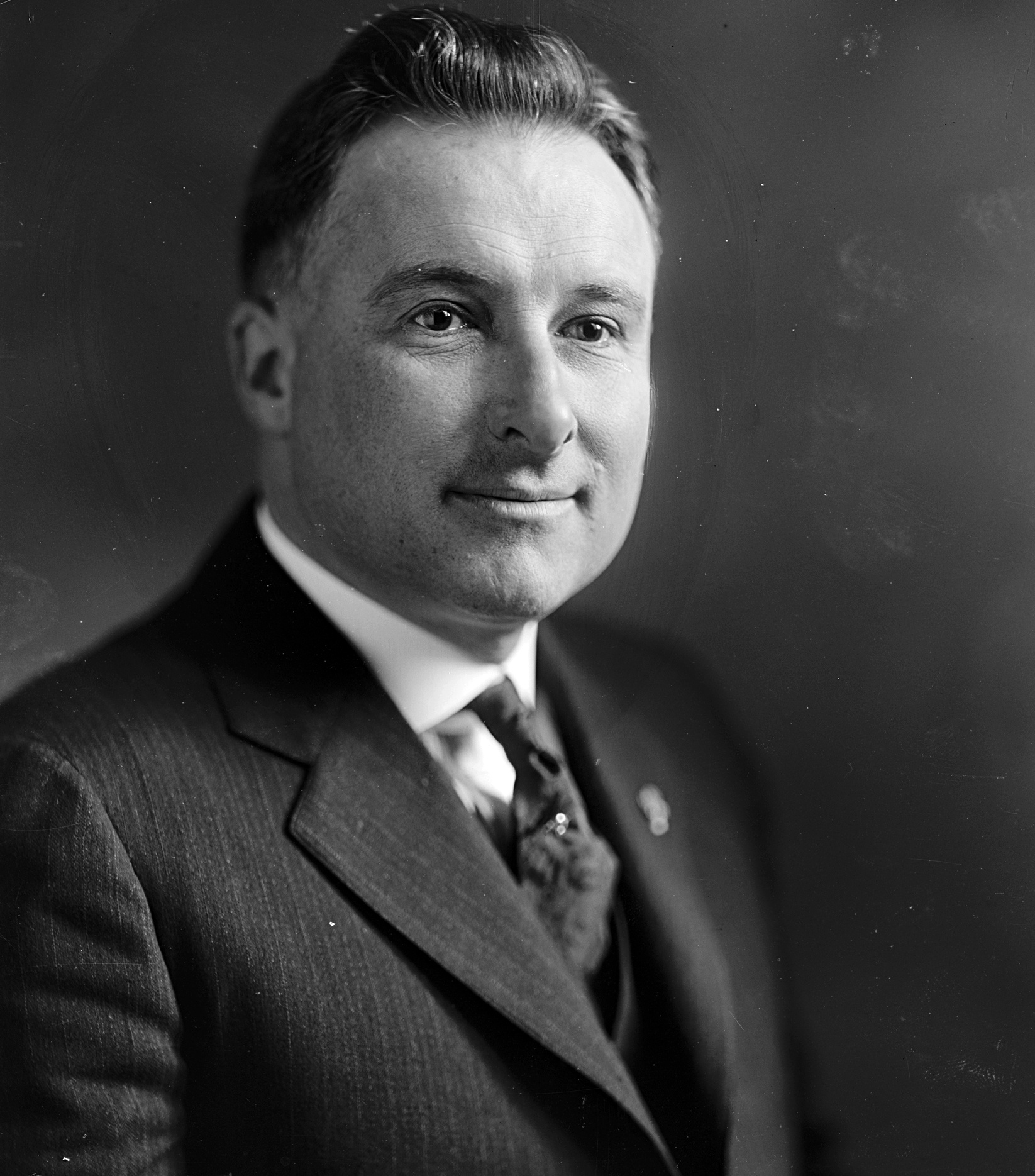

Member of the U.S. House of Representatives from California's 8th district
- In office March 4, 1921 – March 3, 1933
- Preceded by: Hugh S. Hersman
- Succeeded by: John J. McGrath

Personal details
- Born: Arthur Monroe Free; January 15, 1879 San Jose, California, U.S.
- Died: April 1, 1953 (aged 74) San Jose, California, U.S.
- Resting place: Oak Hill Memorial Park
- Party: Republican
- Spouse: Mabel Free
- Children: Lloyd
- Education: Stanford University

Arthur Monroe Free (January 15, 1879 – April 1, 1953) was an American lawyer and politician who served six terms as a United States representative from California from 1921 to 1933.

== Biography ==
He was born in San Jose, California and graduated from Stanford University in 1901 and from its law department in 1903. That same year, he was admitted to the bar and commenced practice in San Jose. He moved to Mountain View and was a city attorney from 1904 to 1910. He was the District Attorney of Santa Clara County from 1907 to 1919. He voluntarily retired and resumed the practice of law in San Jose.

Free was a delegate to the Republican state conventions in 1914 and from 1920 to 1936.

== Congress ==
He was elected as a Republican to the Sixty-seventh and to the five succeeding Congresses (March 4, 1921 – March 3, 1933). He was an unsuccessful candidate for reelection in 1932 to the Seventy-third Congress.

In Congress he served on several committees, notably the House Merchant and Marine Fisheries Committee, and the House Immigration and Naturalization Committee. He was known for successfully introducing and championing the federal statue that created Moffett Federal Airfield. In 1929, Free wrote a short book about Herbert Hoover.

== Later career and death ==
Arthur's son Lloyd A. Free was a founder of the Institute for International Social Research.

== Legacy ==
The Arthur Monroe Free House is listed on the National Register of Historic Places. The cottage in Mountain View that Free purchased in 1894 is now the home of the Michelin Star Restaurant, Chez TJ.

== Electoral history ==
United States House of Representatives elections, 1920
Party	Candidate	Votes	%
Republican	Arthur M. Free	46,823	64%
Democratic	Hugh S. Hersman (Incumbent)	26,311	36%
Total votes		73,134	100%
Republican gain from Democratic			

United States House of Representatives elections, 1922
Party	Candidate	Votes	%
Republican	Arthur M. Free (Incumbent)	57,926	100.0%
Republican hold			

United States House of Representatives elections, 1924
Party	Candidate	Votes	%
Republican	Arthur M. Free (Incumbent)	55,713	100.0%
Republican hold			

United States House of Representatives elections, 1926
Party	Candidate	Votes	%
Republican	Arthur M. Free (Incumbent)	60,384	67.7%
Democratic	Philip G. Sheehy	28,836	32.3%
Total votes		89,220	100.0%
Republican hold			

United States House of Representatives elections, 1928
Party	Candidate	Votes	%
Republican	Arthur M. Free (Incumbent)	80,613	68%
Democratic	Cecelia M. Casserly	37,947	32%
Total votes		118,560	100%
Republican hold			

United States House of Representatives elections, 1930
Party	Candidate	Votes	%
Republican	Arthur M. Free (Incumbent)	93,377	100.0%
Republican hold			

United States House of Representatives elections, 1932
Party	Candidate	Votes	%
Democratic	John J. McGrath	65,455	56.9%
Republican	Arthur M. Free (Incumbent)	49,487	43.1%
Total votes		114,942	100.0%
Democratic gain from Republican			

U.S. House of Representatives
Preceded by Hugh S. Hersman	Member of the U.S. House of Representatives from California's 8th congressional district 1921–1933	Succeeded by John J. McGrath
