= Mala Murthy =

American neuroscientist

- Born: 1975 (age 50–51)
- Education: Massachusetts Institute of Technology; Stanford University
- Scientific career
- Workplaces: California Institute of Technology; Princeton University
- Doctoral advisor: Thomas Schwarz; Richard Scheller
- Website: https://mala-murthy.squarespace.com

Mala Murthy is an American neuroscientist who serves as the director of the Princeton Neuroscience Institute, and she is the Karol and Marnie Marcin '96 Professor of Neuroscience at Princeton University. Her work centers around how the brain extracts important information from the sensory world and utilises that information to modulate behavior in a social context. She is most known for her work in acoustic communication and song production in courting Drosophila fruit flies. Murthy and colleagues have also published an automated system (LEAP and SLEAP) for measuring animal pose in movies with one or more animals.

== Education ==
Prof. Murthy received her B.S. in biology from MIT. She was a Burchards scholar in the humanities and won the John L. Asinari prize for outstanding undergraduate research in the life sciences. She then received her PhD in Neuroscience from Stanford University, working with Thomas Schwarz and Richard Scheller. Her thesis research centered on mechanisms of vesicle trafficking to cell membranes. She did postdoctoral work in systems neuroscience with Gilles Laurent at Caltech as a Helen Hay Whitney fellow stereotypy in the central brain of Drosophila, which is a region of the brain important for learning and memory.

== Awards and recognition ==
- The National Science Foundation CAREER Award
- Alfred P. Sloan fellowship
- Klingenstein fellowship
- McKnight Scholar award
- NINDS Research Program award
- Faculty Scholars at Howard Hughes Medical Institute (2016)
- Wiley Prize in Biomedical Sciences (2026).
