= Jack Z. Anderson =

American politician (1904–1981)

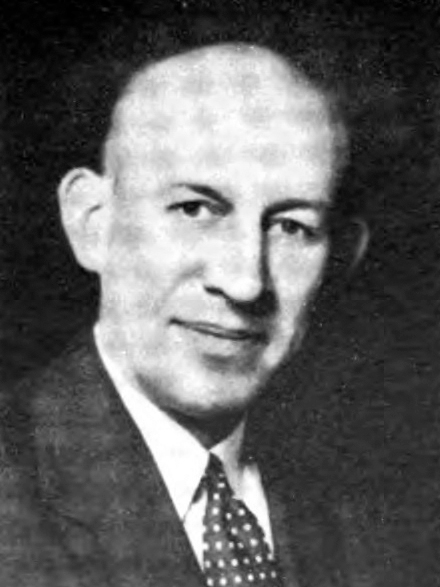

Member of the U.S. House of Representatives from California's 8th district
- In office January 3, 1939 – January 3, 1953
- Preceded by: John J. McGrath
- Succeeded by: George Paul Miller

Personal details
- Born: John Zuinglius Anderson; March 22, 1904 Oakland, California, US
- Died: February 9, 1981 (aged 76) Hollister, California, US
- Party: Republican Party

John Zuinglius Anderson (March 22, 1904 – February 9, 1981) was an American farmer and politician who served seven consecutive terms as a U.S. representative from California from 1939 to 1953.

== Early life and career ==
Born in Oakland, California on March 22, 1904, Anderson moved with his parents to Santa Cruz, California, the same year, and to San Jose, California, in 1913, where he attended the public schools. He graduated from San Jose High School in 1923.

He moved to San Juan Bautista, California, in 1925 and engaged in agricultural pursuits and fruit growing.

== Congress ==
Anderson was elected as a Republican to the Seventy-sixth and to the six succeeding Congresses (January 3, 1939 – January 3, 1953). He did not seek renomination in 1952.

=== Japanese internment during World War II ===
He was a strong supporter of forcing Japanese-American citizens from the Pacific Coast states during World War II, stating in 1945:

"As a member of the California congressional delegation I have consistently opposed the return of the Japanese-Americans to the Pacific coast while the war against Japan in the Pacific is in progress. I was one of those who as early as Dec. 8, 1941, advocated the immediate removal of all persons of Japanese descent from restricted and prohibited areas in California, Oregon and Washington."

== Career after Congress ==
Anderson served as a member of Bank of America's board of directors.

He also served as president of the California Canning Pear Association and the Pacific States Canning Pear Association, and was a special assistant to U.S. Secretary of Agriculture Ezra Taft Benson from 1955-56.

Anderson worked as an administrative assistant to President Dwight D. Eisenhower from December 15, 1956, to January 20, 1961. He then worked as a member of staff of the U.S. House Veterans' Affairs Committee until June 30, 1962.

== Death ==
He retired to Hollister, California, where he died of a self-inflicted gunshot wound on February 9, 1981. His remains were cremated and his ashes scattered at the top of Sonora Pass in California's Sierra Nevada mountains.

== Electoral history ==
United States House of Representatives elections, 1938
Party	Candidate	Votes	%
Republican	Jack Z. Anderson	84,084	55%
Democratic	John J. McGrath (Incumbent)	68,681	45%
Total votes		152,765	100%
Republican gain from Democratic			

United States House of Representatives elections, 1940
Party	Candidate	Votes	%
Republican	Jack Z. Anderson (Incumbent)	148,180	96.7%
Communist	Elizabeth Nichols	5,186	3.3%
Democratic	John J. McGrath (write-in)	37	0.1%
Total votes		153,403	100.0%
Republican hold			

United States House of Representatives elections, 1942
Party	Candidate	Votes	%
Republican	Jack Z. Anderson (Incumbent)	91,536	99.9%
Communist	Elizabeth Nicholas (write-in)	102	0.1%
Total votes		91,638	100.0%
Republican hold			

United States House of Representatives elections, 1944
Party	Candidate	Votes	%
Republican	Jack Z. Anderson (Incumbent)	94,218	56.5%
Democratic	Arthur L. Johnson	72,420	43.5%
Total votes		166,638	100.0%
Republican hold			

United States House of Representatives elections, 1946
Party	Candidate	Votes	%
Republican	Jack Z. Anderson (Incumbent)	113,325	100.0%
Republican hold			

United States House of Representatives elections, 1948
Party	Candidate	Votes	%
Republican	Jack Z. Anderson (Incumbent)	161,743	79.9%
Progressive	Paul Taylor	40,670	20.1%
Total votes		202,413	100.0%
Republican hold			

United States House of Representatives elections, 1950
Party	Candidate	Votes	%
Republican	Jack Z. Anderson (Incumbent)	168,510	83.1%
Progressive	John A. Peterson	34,176	16.9%
Total votes		202,686	100.0%
Republican hold			

U.S. House of Representatives
Preceded by John J. McGrath	Member of the U.S. House of Representatives from California's 8th congressional district 1939–1953	Succeeded by George P. Miller
