= Hugh S. Hersman =

American politician (1872–1954)

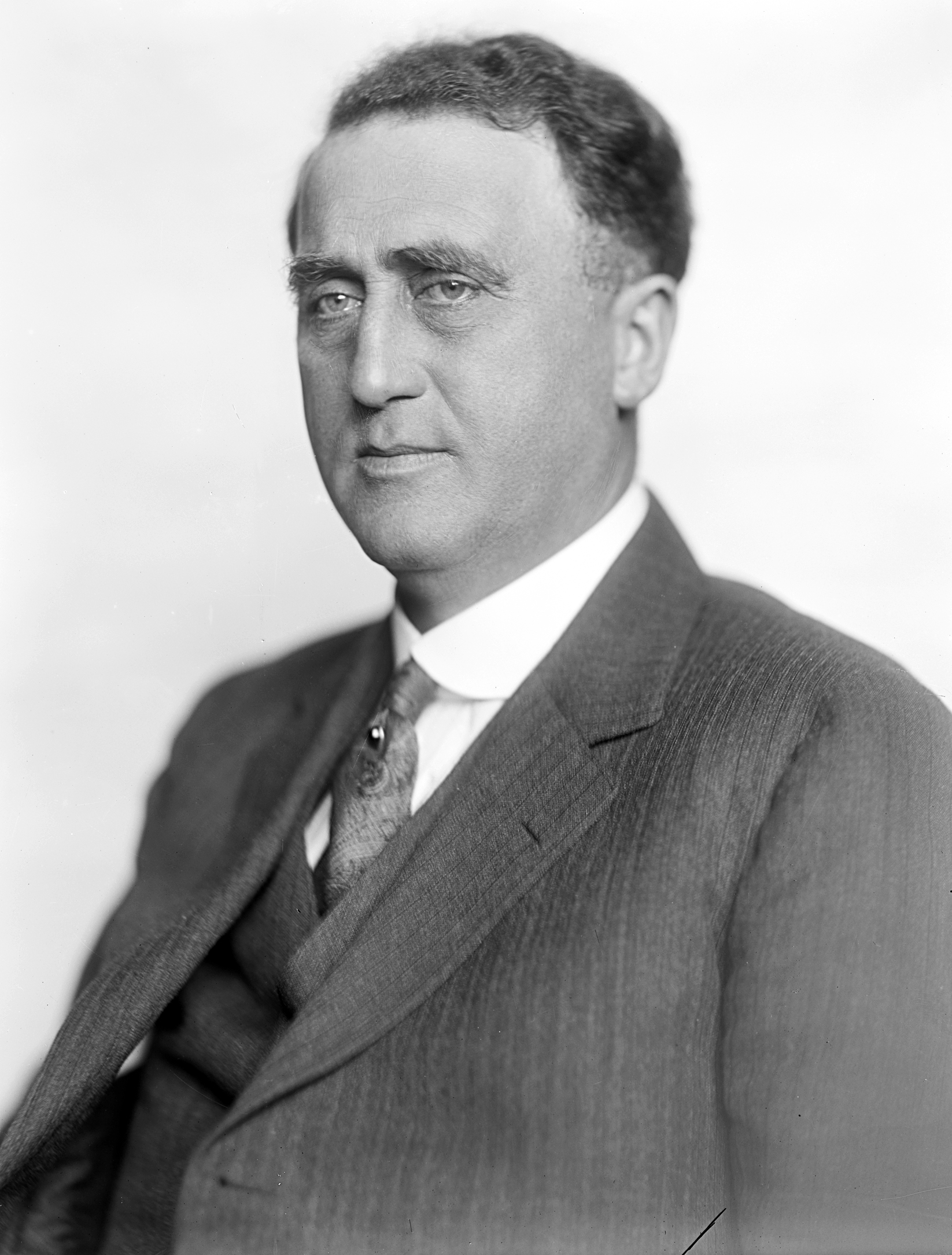

Member of the U.S. House of Representatives from California's 8th district
- In office March 4, 1919 – March 3, 1921
- Preceded by: Everis A. Hayes
- Succeeded by: Arthur M. Free

Personal details
- Born: Hugh Steel Hersman; July 8, 1872 Port Deposit, Maryland
- Died: March 7, 1954 (aged 81) San Francisco, California
- Resting place: Nottingham Cemetery, Colora, Maryland
- Party: Democratic Party
- Education: Southwestern Presbyterian University
- Occupation: Banker

Hugh Steel Hersman (July 8, 1872 – March 7, 1954) was an American banker, businessman, and politician who served one term as a U.S. representative from California from 1919 to 1921.

== Biography ==
Born in Port Deposit, Maryland, Hersman moved to California with his parents, who settled in Berkeley in 1881. He attended the public schools in California. He was graduated from the Southwestern Presbyterian University, Tennessee, in 1893. He studied at the University of California at Berkeley in 1897 and 1898.

=== Business ===
He served as president of the First National Bank, Gilroy, California, from 1914 to 1918, and served as officer and director of various corporations.

=== Congress ===
Hersman was elected as a Democrat to the Sixty-sixth Congress (March 4, 1919 – March 3, 1921). He was an unsuccessful for reelection in 1920 to the Sixty-seventh Congress, losing the election to Republican Arthur M. Free.

=== Later career and death ===
He served as member of the board of directors of the American Trust Co., Gilroy, California. He died in San Francisco, California, March 7, 1954. He was interred in Nottingham Cemetery, Colora, Maryland.

== Electoral history ==
United States House of Representatives elections, 1918
Party	Candidate	Votes	%
Democratic	Hugh S. Hersman	31,167	53%
Republican	Everis A. Hayes (Incumbent)	27,641	47%
Total votes		58,808	100%
Democratic gain from Republican			

United States House of Representatives elections, 1920
Party	Candidate	Votes	%
Republican	Arthur M. Free	46,823	64%
Democratic	Hugh S. Hersman (Incumbent)	26,311	36%
Total votes		73,134	100%
Republican gain from Democratic			

U.S. House of Representatives
Preceded by Everis A. Hayes	Member of the U.S. House of Representatives from California's 8th congressional district 1919–1921	Succeeded by Arthur M. Free
