= Lloyd A. Free =

American pollster (1908–1996)

Lloyd A. Free (29 September 1908 — 11 November 1996) was a pollster who worked with Hadley Cantril and the Institute for International Social Research (IISR).

Lloyd was born in San Jose, California, son of Arthur M. Free, a six-term Congressman. He was a campaign manager for his father, and studied at Princeton University, graduating as valedictorian of the Class of 1930. He went to George Washington University to study law, then transferred to Stanford University where in 1934 he obtained the Bachelor of Law.

Most of Free’s career looked beyond his native land: In 1931 he taught political science at Yenching University. Then he served as commentator in the London, England radio studios of BBC and CBS. Returning to Princeton, for two years he taught in the School of Public and International Affairs. He became an editor of Public Opinion Quarterly and conducted opinion polls in Brazil.

In the war against Hitler, Free joined the Foreign Broadcast Monitoring Service. He counted references to specific military units mentioned in propaganda broadcasts and made accurate inferences about enemy offensive movements.

After the war he assisted UNESCO in their communication operations before continuing similarly with the State Department. On February 11, 1946, he married Elsbeth Studer.

He and Hadley Cantril established the Institute for International Social Research. They did opinion polling in France, Nigeria, Japan, Thailand, and the Philippines, publishing the results, frequently as an Institute publication.

In 1968 they published The Political Beliefs of Americans which reported their finding that "Americans were not divided so much among themselves as within themselves with the same people professing a belief in a small, low-tax government while at the same time professing support for a wide range of big, expensive government programs." This study is "cited by analysts trying to explain what often seems to be a political impasse in efforts to balance the Federal budget." The paradox, phrased as "conservative egalitarianism", was confirmed in 2009 by Benjamin Page and Laurence R. Jacobs.

Free was a member of the Council on Foreign Relations and of the World Association for Public Opinion Research.

== Works ==
- 1956: (with Renzo Sereno) Italy: dependent ally or independent partner, Institute for International Social Research
- 1959: Six allies and a neutral: a study of the international outlooks of political leaders in the United States, Britain, France, West Germany, Italy, Japan and India, Free Press
- 1960: Attitudes of the Cuban People toward the Castro regime in late Spring of 1960, IISR
- 1960: A brief report on the dynamics of Philippine politics, Institute for International Social Research.
- 1961: Some international implications of the political psychology of Brazilians, IISR
- 1964: The Attitudes, Hopes and Fears of Nigerians, IISR
- 1965: Attitudes, Hopes and Fears of the Dominican People, IISR
- 1967: (with Hadley Cantril) The Political Beliefs of Americans, a study of Public Opinion, Rutgers University Press and Simon and Schuster (1968)
- 1969: International Attitudes in Four Asian Democracies; a study of parliamentary opinion in Japan, India, Malaysia and the Philippines, and public opinion in Japan in spring 1968, IISR
- 1973: (edited with William Watts) State of the Nation, Universe Books, NY
- 1976: How Others See Us, Lexington Books.
