= Harold Gulliksen =

American psychologist

Harold Oliver Gulliksen
- Born: July 18, 1903; Washington
- Died: October 27, 1996 (aged 93); Princeton, New Jersey
- Education: University of Chicago; University of Washington
- Scientific career
- Fields: Psychology
- Workplaces: Princeton University
- Doctoral advisor: Louis Leon Thurstone
- Doctoral students: Michael Friendly; Howard Wainer; James Ramsay

Harold Oliver Gulliksen (July 18, 1903 – October 27, 1996) was an American psychologist. A professor at Princeton University for most of his academic career, Gulliksen pioneered in the field of psychometrics. In 1952 he was elected as a Fellow of the American Statistical Association.
