= John J. McGrath =

Irish-American politician (1872–1951)

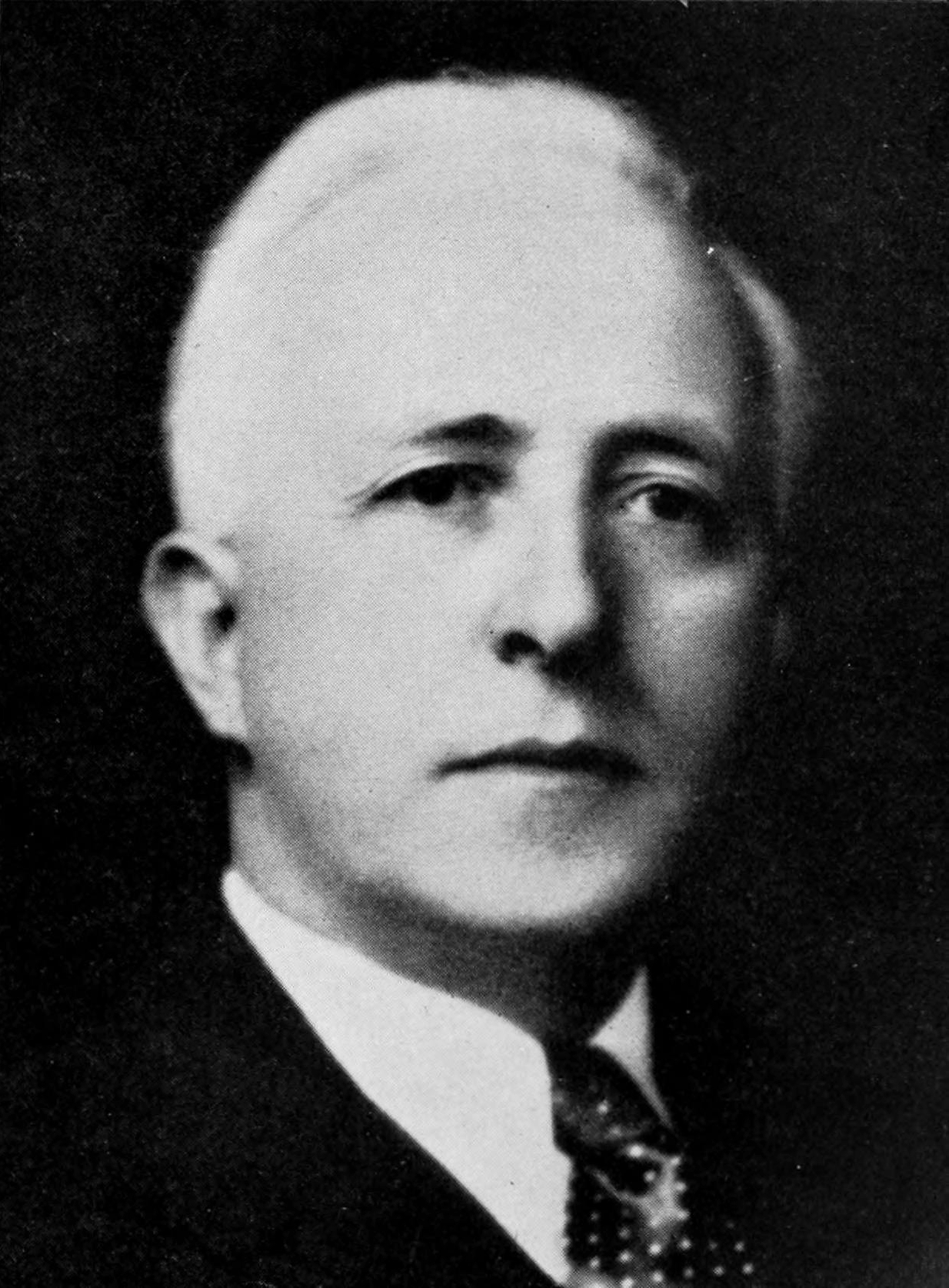
- McGrath c. 1934

Member of the U.S. House of Representatives from California's 8th district
- In office March 4, 1933 – January 3, 1939
- Preceded by: Arthur M. Free
- Succeeded by: Jack Z. Anderson

Personal details
- Born: John Joseph McGrath; July 23, 1873 Limerick, Ireland
- Died: August 25, 1951 (aged 78) San Mateo, California, U.S.
- Party: Democratic

John Joseph McGrath (July 23, 1872 – August 25, 1951) was an Irish-American politician who served as a U.S. representative from California for three terms from 1933 to 1939.

== Biography ==
McGrath was born in Limerick, Ireland, while the country was a part of the United Kingdom. He was educated at the Christian Brothers College in Cork and immigrated to the United States at the age of seventeen, living initially in Chicago. He studied law briefly and worked as a salesman and sales manager for many years, becoming a U.S. citizen in 1896.

In California he served as postmaster of San Mateo from 1916 to 1925, and as a justice of the peace in San Mateo County from 1928 to 1932.

=== Congress ===
In 1932 he was elected to Congress as a Democrat, defeating incumbent Arthur M. Free in the 8th district, which ran from San Mateo County south across Santa Clara, Santa Cruz, and Monterey Counties. He served three full terms from 1933 to 1939, but was defeated for re-election in 1938 by Republican Jack Z. Anderson.

=== Later career and death ===
Subsequently, he served as commissioner for immigration and naturalization in San Francisco from 1939 to 1940 before retiring. He died in 1951 in San Mateo.

== Electoral history ==
1932 California's 8th congressional district election
Party	Candidate	Votes	%
Democratic	John J. McGrath	65,455	56.9%
Republican	Arthur M. Free (Incumbent)	49,487	43.1%
Total votes		114,942	100.0%
Democratic gain from Republican			

1934 California's 8th congressional district election
Party	Candidate	Votes	%
Democratic	John J. McGrath (Incumbent)	107,325	100.0%
Democratic hold			

1936 California's 8th congressional district election
Party	Candidate	Votes	%
Democratic	John J. McGrath (Incumbent)	78,557	57.6%
Republican	Alonzo L. Baker	57,808	43.4%
Total votes		136,365	100.0%
Democratic hold			

1938 California's 8th congressional district election
Party	Candidate	Votes	%
Republican	Jack Z. Anderson	84,084	55%
Democratic	John J. McGrath (Incumbent)	68,681	45%
Total votes		152,765	100%
Republican gain from Democratic			

1940 California's 8th congressional district election
Party	Candidate	Votes	%
Republican	Jack Z. Anderson (Incumbent)	148,180	96.7%
Communist	Elizabeth Nichols	5,186	3.3%
Democratic	John J. McGrath (write-in)	37	0.1%
Total votes		153,403	100.0%
Republican hold			

U.S. House of Representatives
Preceded by Arthur M. Free	Member of the U.S. House of Representatives from California's 8th congressional district 1933–1939	Succeeded by Jack Z. Anderson
