= James R. Akerman =

American geographer

James Richard Akerman
- Born: October 1956 (age 69)
- Education: Pennsylvania State University
- Scientific career
- Fields: Geographer, administrator

James Richard Akerman (born October 1956) is an American geographer and former director of the Newberry Library's Hermon Dunlap Smith Center for the History of Cartography. He is known for his work on the history of cartography.

Akerman obtained his B.A.in Sociology from Denison University in 1978, his M.A. in Geography from the University of Michigan in 1981 and his Ph.D. also in Geography from Pennsylvania State University in 1991.

In 1985 Akerman started at the Newberry Library as acting and assistant curator of maps. In 1988 he became Assistant Director and in 1995 Acting Director of the Hermon Dunlap Smith Center for the History of Cartography. He also served as Curator of Maps from 2011 until his retirement in 2022.

== Selected publications ==
- Akerman, James R., and Karrow, Robert W., eds., Maps: Finding Our Place in the World, Chicago, IL: University of Chicago Press. 2007.
- Akerman, James R., ed. The imperial map: cartography and the mastery of empire. Vol. 15. University of Chicago Press, 2009.
- Akerman, James R., ed. Decolonizing the Map: Cartography from Colony to Nation. Chicago: University of Chicago Press, 2017.
