= John H. Rousselot =

American politician

John Rousselot
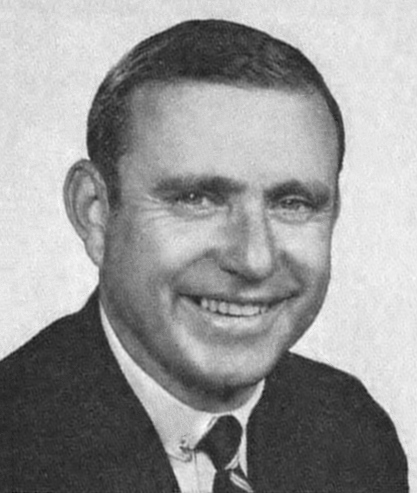
- Official portrait, 1973

Member of the U.S. House of Representatives from California
- In office June 30, 1970 – January 3, 1983
- Preceded by: Glenard P. Lipscomb
- Succeeded by: Matthew G. Martínez (redistricted)
- Constituency: 24th district (1970–1975); 26th district (1975–1983)
- In office January 3, 1961 – January 3, 1963
- Preceded by: George A. Kasem
- Succeeded by: Ronald B. Cameron
- Constituency: 25th district

Personal details
- Born: John Harbin Rousselot; November 1, 1927 Los Angeles, California, U.S.
- Died: May 11, 2003 (aged 75) Irvine, California, U.S.
- Party: Republican
- Education: Principia College (BA)

John Harbin Rousselot (November 1, 1927 – May 11, 2003) was a U.S. representative from southern California. Although the territory he represented was generally the same, in eastern Los Angeles County, the district was renumbered several times during his congressional career.

== Biography ==
Born in 1927 in Los Angeles, California, Rousselot attended the public schools of San Marino and South Pasadena. He received a B.A. from Principia College, Elsah, Illinois, in 1949, and went to work as an insurance agent. During the 1950s he also was an author and public relations consultant.

From 1954 to 1955, Rousselot served as assistant to the public relations director of Pacific Finance Corp., Los Angeles, California. He served as deputy to the chairman of the California Board of Equalization in 1956, and was director of public information for the Federal Housing Administration in Washington, D.C., from 1958 to 1960.

Rousselot resigned his position at the FHA to return to southern California to run for Congress. His first notable political activity had been as a delegate to the 1956 Republican National Convention, and he had served as a member of the executive committee of the California Republican State Central Committee in 1956–57.

=== Congress ===
Rousselot was elected as a Republican to the Eighty-seventh Congress (January 3, 1961 – January 3, 1963) from California's 25th congressional district, defeating Democratic incumbent George A. Kasem.

He was an unsuccessful candidate for reelection to the Eighty-eighth Congress in 1962, losing to Democrat Ronald B. Cameron.

During the next few years, Rousselot worked as a management consultant and as Western regional director for the ultraconservative John Birch Society. His longtime association with this group had stimulated controversy during his career as a Congressman. Two of his allies during this time were the ultraconservative, resigned General Edwin Walker, and the segregationist Reverend Billy James Hargis. All three were longtime members of the John Birch Society, with Rousselot serving as the group's national public relations director. Rousselot sat on the "Co-ordination of Conservative Efforts" committee of Hargis' Anti-Communist Liaison organization.

Rousselot was elected to the Ninety-first Congress, by special election, to fill the vacancy caused by the death of United States Representative Glenard P. Lipscomb in California's 24th congressional district, and reelected to the six succeeding Congresses (June 30, 1970 – January 3, 1983).

In the Republican primary for the 1970 special election, he narrowly edged out former congressman Patrick Hillings and former football star and doctor Bill McColl.

In the special general election he handily defeated Democrat Myrlie Evers, the widow of assassinated civil rights activist Medgar Evers.

The district still was numbered the 24th when he won full terms in 1970 and 1972, but a 1973 redistricting ordered by the California Supreme Court renumbered it the 26th.

Rousselot was an unsuccessful candidate for reelection in 1982 after a partisan redistricting divided his old congressional district, leading him to run in the 30th District represented by Democrat Matthew Martinez, who won the general election by 54% to 46%.

=== Later career ===
Rousselot served as special assistant to President Ronald Reagan for business matters in 1983. He was president of the National Council of Savings Institutions, a lobbying group, from 1985 to 1988.

He was an unsuccessful candidate for nomination to the One Hundred Third Congress in 1992 in the newly redrawn 25th Congressional District, which ultimately was won by Republican Howard McKeon.

== Death ==
Rousselot died of heart failure in Irvine, California, in 2003.

== Electoral history ==
1970 special election
Party	Candidate	Votes	%
Republican	John H. Rousselot	62,749	68.2
Democratic	Myrlie B. Evers	29,248	31.8
Total votes		91,997	100.0
Turnout			
Republican hold			

1970 United States House of Representatives elections in California, District 24
Party	Candidate	Votes	%
Republican	John H. Rousselot (inc.)	124,071	65.1
Democratic	Myrlie B. Evers	61,777	32.4
American Independent	Brian Scanlon	3,018	1.6
Peace and Freedom	Harold Kaplan	1,858	1.0
Total votes		190,724	100.0
Turnout			
Republican hold			

1972 United States House of Representatives elections in California, District 24
Party	Candidate	Votes	%
Republican	John H. Rousselot (inc.)	141,274	70.1
Democratic	Luther Mandell	60,170	29.9
Total votes		201,444	
Republican hold			

1974 election
Party	Candidate	Votes	%
Republican	John H. Rousselot (inc.)	80,782	58.9
Democratic	Paul A. Conforti	56,487	41.1
Total votes		137,269	100.0
Turnout			
Republican hold			

1976 election
Party	Candidate	Votes	%
Republican	John H. Rousselot (inc.)	112,619	65.6
Democratic	Latta Bruce	59,093	34.4
Total votes		171,712	100.0
Turnout			
Republican hold			

1978 election
Party	Candidate	Votes	%
Republican	John H. Rousselot (inc.)	113,059	100.0
Turnout			
Republican hold			

1980 election
Party	Candidate	Votes	%
Republican	John H. Rousselot (inc.)	116,715	70.9
Democratic	Joseph Louis Lisoni	40,099	24.4
Libertarian	William "B. J." Wagener	7,700	4.7
Total votes		164,514	100.0
Turnout			
Republican hold			

1982 United States House of Representatives elections in California
Party	Candidate	Votes	%
Democratic	Matthew G. Martínez (Incumbent)	60,905	53.9
Republican	John H. Rousselot (Incumbent)	52,177	46.1
Total votes		113,082	100.0
Democratic hold			

U.S. House of Representatives
Preceded by George A. Kasem	Member of the U.S. House of Representatives from California's 25th congressional district 1961–1963	Succeeded by Ronald B. Cameron
Preceded by Glenard P. Lipscomb	Member of the U.S. House of Representatives from California's 24th congressional district 1970–1975	Succeeded by Henry Waxman
Preceded by Thomas M. Rees	Member of the U.S. House of Representatives from California's 26th congressional district 1975–1983	Succeeded by Howard Berman
Party political offices
Preceded by Dick Schulze	Chair of the Republican Study Committee; 1980–1981	Succeeded by Dick Schulze
