= California's 25th congressional district =

U.S. House district for California

Coordinates: 34.55°N 118.2°W

- Interactive map of district boundaries
- Representative: Raul Ruiz; D–Indio
- Population (2025): 798,806
- Median household income: $70,829
- Ethnicity: 64.8% Hispanic; 24.3% White; 4.4% Black; 2.8% Asian; 2.3% Two or more races; 0.9% Native American; 0.6% other
- Cook PVI: D+3

California's 25th congressional district is a congressional district in the U.S. state of California. The district is currently represented by Democrat Raul Ruiz.

The district includes all of Imperial County and parts of Riverside County and San Bernardino County. Cities in the 25th district include Cathedral City, Indio, Coachella, El Centro, Calexico, San Jacinto, Hemet, and Needles. Most of the majority-Latino parts of the Coachella Valley are in the 25th, while the rest of the valley is in the 41st district.

== Demographics ==
According to the APM Research Lab's Voter Profile Tools (featuring the U.S. Census Bureau's 2019 American Community Survey), the district contained about 491,000 potential voters (citizens, age 18+). Of these, 44% are White, 34% Latino, 10% Black, and 9% Asian. Immigrants make up 17% of the district's potential voters. Median income among households (with one or more potential voter) in the district is about $86,600, while 9% of households live below the poverty line. 12% of residents 25 years and older have not graduated high school, while 26% hold a bachelor's degree or higher.

== Recent election results from statewide races ==
=== 2023–2027 boundaries ===
| Year | Office | Results |
|---|---|---|
| 2008 | President | Obama 54% - 45% |
| 2010 | Governor | Brown 48% - 45% |
| 2010 | Lt. Governor | Maldonado 44% - 43% |
| 2010 | Secretary of State | Bowen 48% - 43% |
| 2010 | Attorney General | Cooley 49% - 42% |
| 2010 | Treasurer | Lockyer 52% - 40% |
| 2010 | Controller | Chiang 48% - 42% |
| 2012 | President | Obama 55% - 43% |
| 2014 | Governor | Brown 55% - 45% |
| 2016 | President | Clinton 56% - 39% |
| 2018 | Governor | Newsom 55% - 45% |
| 2018 | Attorney General | Becerra 57% - 43% |
| 2020 | President | Biden 57% - 41% |
| 2022 | Senate (Reg.) | Padilla 55% - 45% |
| 2022 | Governor | Newsom 53% - 47% |
| 2022 | Lt. Governor | Kounalakis 52% - 48% |
| 2022 | Secretary of State | Weber 54% - 46% |
| 2022 | Attorney General | Bonta 53% - 47% |
| 2022 | Treasurer | Ma 52% - 48% |
| 2022 | Controller | Cohen 52% - 48% |
| 2024 | President | Harris 50% - 48% |
| 2024 | Senate (Reg.) | Schiff 51% - 49% |

== Composition ==
| FIPS County Code | County | Seat | Population |
|---|---|---|---|
| 25 | Imperial | El Centro | 179,057 |
| 65 | Riverside | Riverside | 2,492,442 |
| 71 | San Bernardino | San Bernardino | 2,195,611 |

Under the 2020 redistricting, California's 25th congressional district is located in the Mojave Desert, and includes the region along the Arizona-California border. It encompasses Imperial County, most of Riverside County, and the eastern edge of San Bernardino County. The area in Riverside County includes the cities of Coachella, Banning, Desert Hot Springs, Indio, San Jacinto, Hemet, Beaumont, Blythe, and Cathedral City; and the census-designated places Valle Vista, East Hemet, Winchester, Cabazon, Whitewater, Desert Edge, Sky Valley, Thousand Palms, Indio Hills, Desert Palms, Bermuda Dunes, Vista Santa Rosa, Thermal, Oasis, Mecca, North Shore, Desert Center, Mesa Verde, and Ripley.

Riverside County is split between this district and the 41st district. They are partitioned by Terwillinger Rd, Bailey Rd, Candelaria, Elder Creek Rd, Bonny Ln, Tule Peak Rd, Eastgate Trail, Goldrush Rd, Rule Valley Rd, Laura Ln, Dove Dr, Lago Grande, Barbara Trail, Valley Dr, Foolish Pleasure Rd, Highway 371, Gelding Way, Puckit Dr, Indian Rd, Wellman Rd, El Toro Rd, Burnt Valley Rd, Cahuilla Rd, Highway 74, Bull Canyon Rd, Santa Rosa-San Jacinto Mountains National Monument, Fred Waring Dr, Washington St, Highway 10, Davall Dr, Dinah Shore Dr, Plumley Rd, Gerald Ford Dr, E Ramon Rd, San Luis Rey Dr, San Joaquin Dr, Clubhouse View Dr, Mount San Jacinto State Park, Azalea Creek, Black Mountain Trail, Highway 243, North Fork San Jacinto River, Stetson Ave, Hemet St, Cornell St, Girard St, E Newport Rd, Domenigoni Parkway, Leon Rd, Grand Ave, State Highway 74, California Ave, W Devonshire Ave, Warren Rd, Ramona Expressway, San Jacinto River, Highway 79, Oak Valley Parkway, Champions Dr, Union St, Brookside Ave.

=== Cities and CDPs with 10,000 or more people ===
- Hemet – 89,833
- Indio – 89,137
- San Jacinto – 53,898
- Beaumont – 53,036
- Cathedral City – 51,493
- El Centro – 44,322
- Coachella – 41,941
- Calexico – 38,633
- Desert Hot Springs – 32,512
- Banning – 29,505
- Brawley – 26,416
- East Hemet – 19,432
- Valle Vista – 19,072
- Imperial – 18,631
- Blythe – 18,317

=== 2,500 – 10,000 people ===
- Bermuda Dunes – 8,244
- Mecca – 8,219
- Thousand Palms – 7,967
- Garnet – 7,118
- Heber – 6,896
- Desert Palms – 6,686
- Calipatria – 6,515
- Holtville – 5,605
- Salton City – 5,155
- Needles – 4,959
- Oasis – 4,468
- Desert Edge – 4,180
- North Shore – 3,585
- Winchester – 3,068
- Thermal – 2,700
- Cabazon – 2,629
- Vista Santa Rosa – 2,607

== List of members representing the district ==
| Member | Party | Dates | Cong- ress | Electoral history | Counties |
|---|---|---|---|---|---|
District created January 3, 1953
| Patrick J. Hillings (Arcadia) | Republican | January 3, 1953 – January 3, 1959 | 83rd 84th 85th | Redistricted from the 12th district and re-elected in 1952. Re-elected in 1954. Re-elected in 1956. Retired to run for Attorney General of California. | 1953–1967; Los Angeles |
| George A. Kasem (West Covina) | Democratic | January 3, 1959 – January 3, 1961 | 86th | Elected in 1958. Lost re-election. | 1953–1967; Los Angeles |
| John H. Rousselot (San Gabriel) | Republican | January 3, 1961 – January 3, 1963 | 87th | Elected in 1960. Lost re-election. | 1953–1967; Los Angeles |
| Ronald B. Cameron (Whittier) | Democratic | January 3, 1963 – January 3, 1967 | 88th 89th | Elected in 1962. Re-elected in 1964. Lost re-election. | 1953–1967; Los Angeles |
| Charles E. Wiggins (West Covina) | Republican | January 3, 1967 – January 3, 1975 | 90th 91st 92nd 93rd | Elected in 1966. Re-elected in 1968. Re-elected in 1970. Re-elected in 1972. Redistricted to the 39th district. | 1967–1973; Los Angeles, Orange |
| Charles E. Wiggins (West Covina) | Republican | January 3, 1967 – January 3, 1975 | 90th 91st 92nd 93rd | Elected in 1966. Re-elected in 1968. Re-elected in 1970. Re-elected in 1972. Redistricted to the 39th district. | 1973–1983; Los Angeles |
| Edward R. Roybal (Los Angeles) | Democratic | January 3, 1975 – January 3, 1993 | 94th 95th 96th 97th 98th 99th 100th 101st 102nd | Redistricted from the 30th district and re-elected in 1974. Re-elected in 1976. Re-elected in 1978. Re-elected in 1980. Re-elected in 1982. Re-elected in 1984. Re-elected in 1986. Re-elected in 1988. Re-elected in 1990. Retired. | 1973–1983; Los Angeles |
| Edward R. Roybal (Los Angeles) | Democratic | January 3, 1975 – January 3, 1993 | 94th 95th 96th 97th 98th 99th 100th 101st 102nd | Redistricted from the 30th district and re-elected in 1974. Re-elected in 1976. Re-elected in 1978. Re-elected in 1980. Re-elected in 1982. Re-elected in 1984. Re-elected in 1986. Re-elected in 1988. Re-elected in 1990. Retired. | 1983–1993; Central/eastern Los Angeles |
| Buck McKeon (Santa Clarita) | Republican | January 3, 1993 – January 3, 2015 | 103rd 104th 105th 106th 107th 108th 109th 110th 111th 112th 113th | Elected in 1992. Re-elected in 1994. Re-elected in 1996. Re-elected in 1998. Re-elected in 2000. Re-elected in 2002. Re-elected in 2004. Re-elected in 2006. Re-elected in 2008. Re-elected in 2010. Re-elected in 2012. Retired. | 1993–2003; Northern Los Angeles |
| Buck McKeon (Santa Clarita) | Republican | January 3, 1993 – January 3, 2015 | 103rd 104th 105th 106th 107th 108th 109th 110th 111th 112th 113th | Elected in 1992. Re-elected in 1994. Re-elected in 1996. Re-elected in 1998. Re-elected in 2000. Re-elected in 2002. Re-elected in 2004. Re-elected in 2006. Re-elected in 2008. Re-elected in 2010. Re-elected in 2012. Retired. | 2003–2013 Inyo, northern Los Angeles, Mono, northwestern San Bernardino |
| Buck McKeon (Santa Clarita) | Republican | January 3, 1993 – January 3, 2015 | 103rd 104th 105th 106th 107th 108th 109th 110th 111th 112th 113th | Elected in 1992. Re-elected in 1994. Re-elected in 1996. Re-elected in 1998. Re-elected in 2000. Re-elected in 2002. Re-elected in 2004. Re-elected in 2006. Re-elected in 2008. Re-elected in 2010. Re-elected in 2012. Retired. | 2013–2023 Northern Los Angeles including Palmdale and Santa Clarita, northeastern Ventura including Simi Valley |
| Steve Knight (Lancaster) | Republican | January 3, 2015 – January 3, 2019 | 114th 115th | Elected in 2014. Re-elected in 2016. Lost re-election. | 2013–2023 Northern Los Angeles including Palmdale and Santa Clarita, northeastern Ventura including Simi Valley |
| Katie Hill (Santa Clarita) | Democratic | January 3, 2019 – November 3, 2019 | 116th | Elected in 2018. Resigned. | 2013–2023 Northern Los Angeles including Palmdale and Santa Clarita, northeastern Ventura including Simi Valley |
| Vacant | | November 3, 2019 – May 19, 2020 | 116th 117th | | 2013–2023 Northern Los Angeles including Palmdale and Santa Clarita, northeastern Ventura including Simi Valley |
| Mike Garcia (Santa Clarita) | Republican | May 19, 2020 – January 3, 2023 | 116th 117th | Elected to finish Hill's term. Re-elected in 2020. Redistricted to the 27th district. | 2013–2023 Northern Los Angeles including Palmdale and Santa Clarita, northeastern Ventura including Simi Valley |
| Raul Ruiz (Indio) | Democratic | January 3, 2023 – present | 118th 119th | Redistricted from the 36th district and re-elected in 2022. Re-elected in 2024. Re-elected in 2026. | 2023–present Indio, Coachella, Desert Hot Springs, Cathedral City, San Jacinto, Hemet, Needles, Half of Rancho Mirage High School (Northern half), Coachella Valley, Palm Springs Area and El Centro in the Colorado Desert |

== Election results ==
=== Original district: 1953–1967 ===
1952 election
| Party | Candidate | Votes | % |
|---|---|---|---|
| Republican | Patrick J. Hillings (Incumbent) | 135,465 | 64.3 |
| Democratic | Woodrow Wilson Sayre | 75,125 | 35.7 |
| Total votes | | 210,590 | 100.0 |
| Turnout | | | |
| Republican hold | | | |

1954 election
| Party | Candidate | Votes | % |
|---|---|---|---|
| Republican | Patrick J. Hillings (Incumbent) | 113,027 | 65.2 |
| Democratic | John S. Sobieski | 60,370 | 34.8 |
| Total votes | | 173,397 | 100.0 |
| Turnout | | | |
| Republican hold | | | |

1956 election
| Party | Candidate | Votes | % |
|---|---|---|---|
| Republican | Patrick J. Hillings (Incumbent) | 166,305 | 63.8 |
| Democratic | John S. Sobieski | 94,180 | 36.2 |
| Total votes | | 260,485 | 100.0 |
| Turnout | | | |
| Republican hold | | | |

1958 election
| Party | Candidate | Votes | % |
|---|---|---|---|
| Democratic | George A. Kasem | 135,009 | 50.1 |
| Republican | Prescott O. Lieberg | 134,406 | 49.9 |
| Total votes | | 269,415 | 100.0 |
| Turnout | | | |
| Democratic gain from Republican | | | |

1960 election
| Party | Candidate | Votes | % |
|---|---|---|---|
| Republican | John H. Rousselot | 182,545 | 53.6 |
| Democratic | George A. Kasem (Incumbent) | 158,289 | 46.4 |
| Total votes | | 340,834 | 100.0 |
| Turnout | | | |
| Republican gain from Democratic | | | |

1962 election
| Party | Candidate | Votes | % |
|---|---|---|---|
| Democratic | Ronald B. Cameron | 62,371 | 53.6 |
| Republican | John H. Rousselot (Incumbent) | 53,961 | 46.4 |
| Total votes | | 116,332 | 100.0 |
| Turnout | | | |
| Democratic gain from Republican | | | |

1964 election
| Party | Candidate | Votes | % |
|---|---|---|---|
| Democratic | Ronald B. Cameron (Incumbent) | 81,320 | 55.4 |
| Republican | Frank J. Walton | 65,344 | 44.6 |
| Total votes | | 146,664 | 100.0 |
| Turnout | | | |
| Democratic hold | | | |

=== First redistricting: 1967–1973 ===
1966 election
| Party | Candidate | Votes | % |
|---|---|---|---|
| Republican | Charles E. Wiggins | 70,154 | 52.6 |
| Democratic | Ronald B. Cameron (Incumbent) | 63,345 | 47.4 |
| Total votes | | 133,499 | |
| Republican gain from Democratic | | | |

1968 election
| Party | Candidate | Votes | % |
|---|---|---|---|
| Republican | Charles E. Wiggins (Incumbent) | 141,600 | 68.6 |
| Democratic | Keith F. Shirey | 64,732 | 31.4 |
| Total votes | | 206,332 | 100.0 |
| Turnout | | | |
| Republican hold | | | |

1970 election
| Party | Candidate | Votes | % |
|---|---|---|---|
| Republican | Charles E. Wiggins (Incumbent) | 116,169 | 63.3 |
| Democratic | Leslie W. "Les" Craven | 64,386 | 35.1 |
| American Independent | Kevin Scanlon | 2,994 | 1.6 |
| Total votes | | 183,549 | 100.0 |
| Turnout | | | |
| Republican hold | | | |

=== Second redistricting: 1973–1983 ===
1972 election
| Party | Candidate | Votes | % |
|---|---|---|---|
| Republican | Charles E. Wiggins (Incumbent) | 115,908 | 64.9 |
| Democratic | Leslie W. "Les" Craven | 50,015 | 31.9 |
| American Independent | Alfred Romirez | 5,541 | 3.1 |
| Total votes | | 171,464 | 100.0 |
| Turnout | | | |
| Republican hold | | | |

1974 election
| Party | Candidate | Votes | % |
|---|---|---|---|
| Democratic | Edward R. Roybal (Incumbent) | 43,998 | 100.0 |
| Turnout | | | |
| Democratic gain from Republican | | | |

1976 election
| Party | Candidate | Votes | % |
|---|---|---|---|
| Democratic | Edward R. Roybal (Incumbent) | 57,966 | 71.9 |
| Republican | Robert K. Watson | 17,737 | 22.0 |
| Peace and Freedom | Marilyn Se | 4,922 | 6.1 |
| Total votes | | 80,625 | 100.0 |
| Turnout | | | |
| Democratic hold | | | |

1978 election
| Party | Candidate | Votes | % |
|---|---|---|---|
| Democratic | Edward R. Roybal (Incumbent) | 45,881 | 67.4 |
| Republican | Robert K. Watson | 22,205 | 32.6 |
| Total votes | | 68,086 | 100.0 |
| Turnout | | | |
| Democratic hold | | | |

1980 election
| Party | Candidate | Votes | % |
|---|---|---|---|
| Democratic | Edward R. Roybal (Incumbent) | 49,080 | 66.0 |
| Republican | Richard E. Ferraro | 21,116 | 28.4 |
| Libertarian | William D. Mitchell | 4,169 | 5.6 |
| Total votes | | 74,365 | 100.0 |
| Turnout | | | |
| Democratic hold | | | |

=== Third redistricting: 1983–1993 ===
1982 election
| Party | Candidate | Votes | % |
|---|---|---|---|
| Democratic | Edward R. Roybal (Incumbent) | 71,106 | 84.5 |
| Libertarian | Daniel John Gorham | 12,060 | 14.5 |
| Total votes | | 83,166 | 100.0 |
| Turnout | | | |
| Democratic hold | | | |

1984 election
| Party | Candidate | Votes | % |
|---|---|---|---|
| Democratic | Edward R. Roybal (Incumbent) | 74,261 | 71.7 |
| Republican | Roy D. "Bill" Bloxom | 24,968 | 24.1 |
| Libertarian | Anthony G. Bajada | 4,370 | 4.2 |
| Total votes | | 103,599 | 100.0 |
| Turnout | | | |
| Democratic hold | | | |

1986 election
| Party | Candidate | Votes | % |
|---|---|---|---|
| Democratic | Edward R. Roybal (Incumbent) | 62,692 | 76.1 |
| Republican | Gregory L. Hardy | 17,558 | 21.3 |
| Libertarian | Ted Brown | 2,163 | 2.6 |
| Total votes | | 82,413 | 100.0 |
| Turnout | | | |
| Democratic hold | | | |

1988 election
| Party | Candidate | Votes | % |
|---|---|---|---|
| Democratic | Edward R. Roybal (Incumbent) | 85,378 | 85.5 |
| Peace and Freedom | Paul Reyes | 8,746 | 8.8 |
| Libertarian | John C. Thie | 5,752 | 5.8 |
| Total votes | | 98,876 | 100.0 |
| Turnout | | | |
| Democratic hold | | | |

1990 election
| Party | Candidate | Votes | % |
|---|---|---|---|
| Democratic | Edward R. Roybal (Incumbent) | 48,120 | 70.0 |
| Republican | Steven J. Renshaw | 17,021 | 24.8 |
| Libertarian | Robert H. Scott | 3,576 | 5.2 |
| Total votes | | 68,717 | 100.0 |
| Turnout | | | |
| Democratic hold | | | |

=== Fourth redistricting: 1993–2003 ===
1992 election
| Party | Candidate | Votes | % |
|---|---|---|---|
| Republican | Buck McKeon | 113,611 | 51.9 |
| Democratic | James H. Gilmartin | 72,233 | 33.0 |
| Independent | Rick Pamplin | 13,930 | 6.4 |
| Libertarian | Peggy L. Christensen | 6,932 | 3.2 |
| Green | Charles Wilken | 6,919 | 3.2 |
| Peace and Freedom | Nancy Lawrence | 5,090 | 2.3 |
| Total votes | | 218,715 | 100.0 |
| Turnout | | | |
| Republican win (new seat) | | | |

1994 election
| Party | Candidate | Votes | % |
|---|---|---|---|
| Republican | Buck McKeon (Incumbent) | 110,301 | 64.89 |
| Democratic | James H. Gilmartin | 53,445 | 31.44 |
| Libertarian | Devin Cutler | 6,205 | 3.65 |
| No party | Tulley (write-in) | 20 | 0.01 |
| Total votes | | 169,971 | 100.0 |
| Turnout | | | |
| Republican hold | | | |

1996 election
| Party | Candidate | Votes | % |
|---|---|---|---|
| Republican | Buck McKeon (Incumbent) | 122,428 | 62.4 |
| Democratic | Diane Trautman | 65,089 | 33.2 |
| Libertarian | Bruce Acker | 6,173 | 3.2 |
| Peace and Freedom | Justin Gerber | 2,513 | 1.2 |
| Total votes | | 196,203 | 100.0 |
| Turnout | | | |
| Republican hold | | | |

1998 election
| Party | Candidate | Votes | % |
|---|---|---|---|
| Republican | Buck McKeon (Incumbent) | 114,013 | 74.67 |
| Libertarian | Bruce Acker | 38,669 | 25.33 |
| Total votes | | 152,682 | 100.0 |
| Turnout | | | |
| Republican hold | | | |

2000 election
| Party | Candidate | Votes | % |
|---|---|---|---|
| Republican | Buck McKeon (Incumbent) | 138,628 | 62.3 |
| Democratic | Sid Gold | 73,921 | 33.2 |
| Libertarian | Bruce R. Acker | 7,219 | 3.2 |
| Natural Law | Mews Small | 3,010 | 1.3 |
| Total votes | | 222,778 | 100.0 |
| Turnout | | | |
| Republican hold | | | |

=== Fifth redistricting: 2003–2013 ===
2002 election
| Party | Candidate | Votes | % |
|---|---|---|---|
| Republican | Buck McKeon (Incumbent) | 80,775 | 65.0 |
| Democratic | Bob Conaway | 38,674 | 31.1 |
| Libertarian | Frank M. Consolo Jr. | 4,887 | 3.9 |
| Total votes | | 124,336 | 100.0 |
| Turnout | | | |
| Republican hold | | | |

2004 election
| Party | Candidate | Votes | % |
|---|---|---|---|
| Republican | Buck McKeon (Incumbent) | 145,575 | 64.5 |
| Democratic | Fred "Tim" Willoughby | 80,395 | 35.5 |
| Total votes | | 225,970 | 100.0 |
| Turnout | | | |
| Republican hold | | | |

2006 election
| Party | Candidate | Votes | % |
|---|---|---|---|
| Republican | Buck McKeon (Incumbent) | 93,987 | 60.0 |
| Democratic | Robert Rodriguez | 55,913 | 35.7 |
| Libertarian | David W. Erickson | 6,873 | 4.3 |
| Total votes | | 156,773 | 100.0 |
| Turnout | | | |
| Republican hold | | | |

2008 election
| Party | Candidate | Votes | % |
|---|---|---|---|
| Republican | Buck McKeon (Incumbent) | 144,660 | 57.73 |
| Democratic | Jackie Conaway | 105,929 | 42.27 |
| Total votes | | 250,589 | 100.0 |
| Turnout | | | 72.24 |
| Republican hold | | | |

2010 election
| Party | Candidate | Votes | % |
|---|---|---|---|
| Republican | Buck McKeon (Incumbent) | 118,308 | 61.83 |
| Democratic | Jackie Conaway | 73,028 | 38.17 |
| Total votes | | 191,336 | 100.0 |
| Turnout | | | |
| Republican hold | | | |

=== Sixth redistricting: 2013–2023 ===
2012 election
| Party | Candidate | Votes | % |
|---|---|---|---|
| Republican | Buck McKeon (Incumbent) | 121,593 | 53.2 |
| Democratic | Lee Rogers | 106,982 | 46.8 |
| Total votes | | 228,575 | 100.0 |
| Turnout | | | |
| Republican hold | | | |

2014 election
| Party | Candidate | Votes | % |
|---|---|---|---|
| Republican | Steve Knight | 60,847 | 53.3 |
| Republican | Tony Strickland | 53,225 | 46.7 |
| Total votes | | 114,072 | 100.0 |
| Turnout | | | |
| Republican hold | | | |

2016 election
| Party | Candidate | Votes | % |
|---|---|---|---|
| Republican | Steve Knight (Incumbent) | 138,755 | 53.1 |
| Democratic | Bryan Caforio | 122,406 | 46.9 |
| Total votes | | 261,161 | 100.0 |
| Republican hold | | | |

2018 election
| Party | Candidate | Votes | % |
|---|---|---|---|
| Democratic | Katie Hill | 133,209 | 54.4 |
| Republican | Steve Knight (Incumbent) | 111,813 | 45.6 |
| Total votes | | 245,022 | 100.0 |
| Democratic gain from Republican | | | |

2020 special election
| Party | Candidate | Votes | % |
|---|---|---|---|
| Republican | Mike Garcia | 95,383 | 54.9 |
| Democratic | Christy Smith | 78,406 | 45.1 |
| Total votes | | 173,868 | 100.0 |
| Republican gain from Democratic | | | |

2020 election
| Party | Candidate | Votes | % |
|---|---|---|---|
| Republican | Mike Garcia (Incumbent) | 169,638 | 50.05 |
| Democratic | Christy Smith | 169,305 | 49.95 |
| Total votes | | 338,943 | 100.0 |
| Republican hold | | | |

=== Seventh redistricting: 2023–present ===
2022 election
| Party | Candidate | Votes | % |
|---|---|---|---|
| Democratic | Raul Ruiz (Incumbent) | 87,641 | 57.4 |
| Republican | Brian Hawkins | 65,101 | 42.6 |
| Total votes | | 152,742 | 100.0 |
| Democratic hold | | | |

2024 election
| Party | Candidate | Votes | % |
|---|---|---|---|
| Democratic | Raul Ruiz (Incumbent) | 137,837 | 56.3 |
| Republican | Ian Weeks | 107,194 | 43.7 |
| Total votes | | 245,031 | 100.0 |
| Democratic hold | | | |

== See also ==
- List of United States congressional districts
- California's congressional districts
