= Ronald B. Cameron =

American politician (1927–2006)

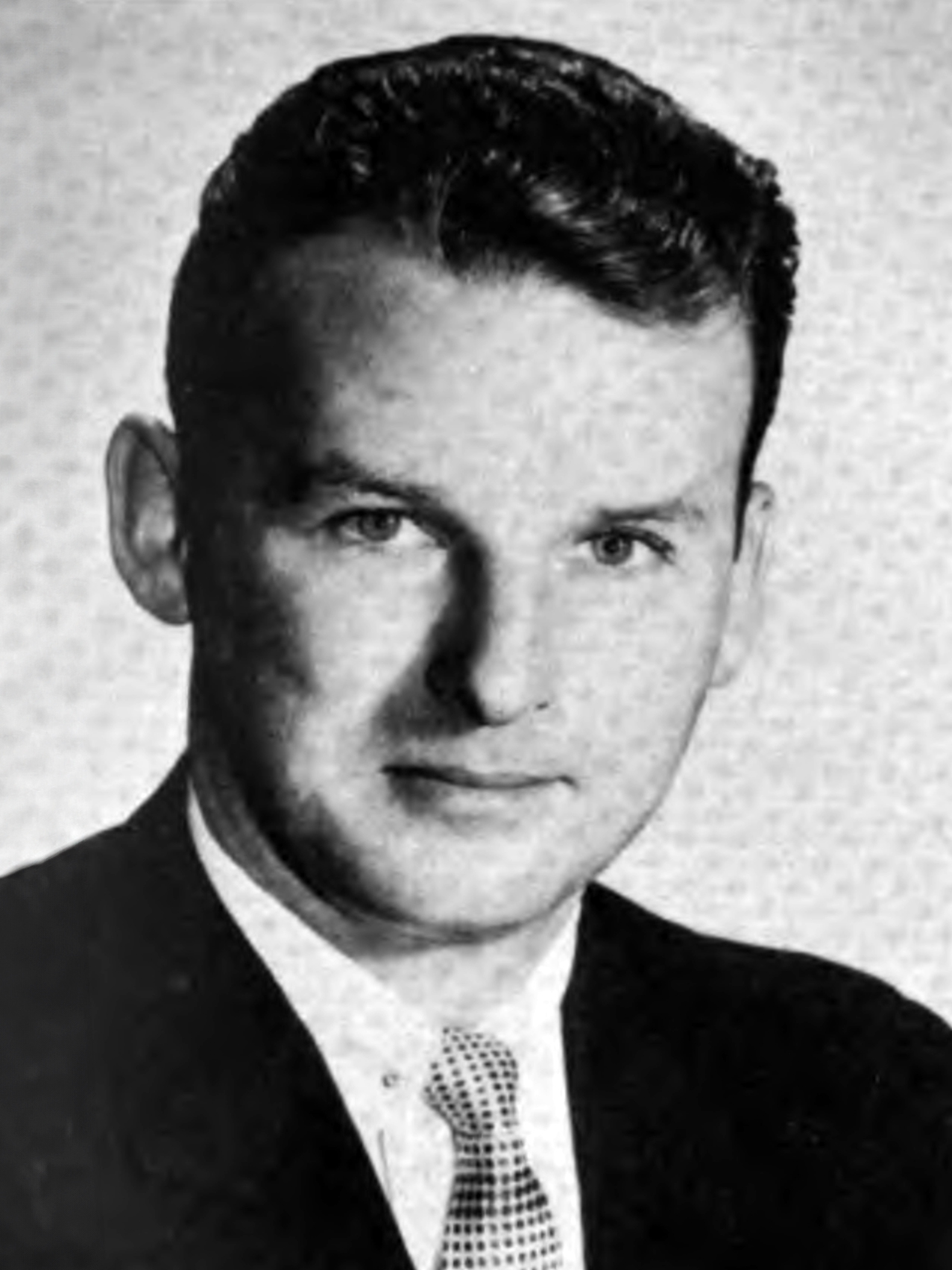
- Official portrait, 1963

Member of the U.S. House of Representatives from California's 25th district
- In office January 3, 1963 – January 3, 1967
- Preceded by: John H. Rousselot
- Succeeded by: Charles E. Wiggins

Member of the California State Assembly from the 50th district
- In office January 5, 1959 – January 3, 1963
- Preceded by: Thomas M. Erwin
- Succeeded by: Phil Soto

Personal details
- Born: Ronald Brooks Cameron; August 16, 1927 Kansas City, Missouri, U.S.
- Died: February 1, 2006 (aged 78) Whittier, California, U.S.
- Spouse: Constance Shook
- Education: Western Reserve Academy; Case Western Reserve University; University of California, Los Angeles

Ronald Brooks Cameron (August 16, 1927 – February 1, 2006) was an American lawyer and politician who served two terms as a U.S. representative from California's 25th congressional district from 1963 to 1967.

== Early life and education ==
Born in Kansas City, Missouri on August 16, 1927, Cameron graduated from Western Reserve Academy, Hudson, Ohio, in 1945. He was in the United States Marine Corps from 1945 to 1946. Cameron attended Case Western Reserve University, Cleveland, Ohio, from 1946 to 1947, and UCLA from 1949 to 1953. He received a J.D. from Pepperdine University School of Law, Malibu, California, in 1973.

== Career ==
Cameron became a certified public accountant in 1954. He served as a member of the California State Assembly from 1958 to 1962, and was a delegate to the 1960 and 1964 Democratic National Conventions.

=== Congress ===
Cameron was elected as a Democrat to the Eighty-eighth and Eighty-ninth Congresses (January 3, 1963–January 3, 1967). He was defeated for re-election to the Ninetieth Congress in 1966. Cameron voted for the Civil Rights Act of 1964 and the Voting Rights Act of 1965.

== Later career and death ==
He resumed practice as an accountant and later he also became an attorney. In 1970, he was the Democratic nominee for California State Controller. Cameron died on February 1, 2006, in Whittier, California.

== Electoral history ==
1962 election
Party	Candidate	Votes	%
Democratic	Ronald B. Cameron	62,371	53.6
Republican	John H. Rousselot (Incumbent)	53,961	46.4
Total votes		116,332	100.0
Turnout			
Democratic gain from Republican			

1964 election
Party	Candidate	Votes	%
Democratic	Ronald B. Cameron (Incumbent)	81,320	55.4
Republican	Frank J. Walton	65,344	44.6
Total votes		146,664	100.0
Turnout			
Democratic hold			

1966 election
Party	Candidate	Votes	%
Republican	Charles E. Wiggins	70,154	52.6
Democratic	Ronald B. Cameron (Incumbent)	63,345	47.4
Total votes		133,499	
Republican gain from Democratic			

U.S. House of Representatives
Preceded by John H. Rousselot	Member of the U.S. House of Representatives from California's 25th congressional district 1963-1967	Succeeded by Charles E. Wiggins
