= Patrick J. Bumatay =

American federal judge (born 1978)

Patrick Bumatay
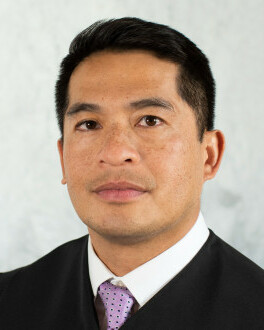

Judge of the United States Court of Appeals for the Ninth Circuit
- Incumbent
- Assumed office December 12, 2019
- Appointed by: Donald Trump
- Preceded by: Carlos Bea

Personal details
- Born: February 14, 1978 (age 48) Secaucus, New Jersey, U.S.
- Education: Yale University (BA); Harvard University (JD)

Patrick Joseph Bumatay (born February 14, 1978) is an Filipino-American lawyer and jurist serving as a United States circuit judge of the United States Court of Appeals for the Ninth Circuit. He was appointed in 2019 by President Donald Trump. Before becoming a federal judge, Bumatay was a federal prosecutor in the Southern District of California.

== Early life and education ==
Bumatay was born in 1978 in Secaucus, New Jersey. He graduated from Yale University in 2000 with a Bachelor of Arts, cum laude. Between 2000 and 2003, he worked as a political campaign staffer and as a paralegal in the Executive Office of the President of the United States. He then attended Harvard Law School, where he was an editor of the Harvard Journal of Law and Public Policy, and graduated in 2006 with a Juris Doctor.

== Early career ==
While in law school, Bumatay was a summer associate at Gibson, Dunn & Crutcher in 2005. After graduating from law school, Bumatay was a law clerk to Judge Timothy Tymkovich of the United States Court of Appeals for the Tenth Circuit from 2006 to 2007. He was a special assistant in the United States Department of Justice's Office of Legal Policy from 2007 to 2008 and Office of the Associate Attorney General from 2008 to 2009. He then clerked for Judge Sandra L. Townes of the United States District Court for the Eastern District of New York from 2009 to 2010.

From 2010 to 2012, Bumatay was in private practice as an associate at the New York City law firm Morvillo Abramowitz Grand Iason & Anello. From 2012 until his judicial appointment in 2018, Bumatay was a federal prosecutor for the Southern District of California in the San Diego office, where he was a member of the Organized Crime and Drug Enforcement Task Forces Section.

He has been a member of the Federalist Society since 2003, the Federal Bar Association (San Diego chapter) since 2016, the National Asian Pacific American Bar Association in 2015 and again since 2018, the National Filipino American Lawyers Association from 2017 to 2018, and the Tom Homann LGBT Law Association since 2017.

== Federal judicial service ==
=== Court of appeals ===
On October 10, 2018, President Donald Trump announced his intent to nominate Bumatay to the Ninth Circuit. Both Senators from California, Dianne Feinstein and Kamala Harris, announced their opposition to his nomination, saying they had not included Bumatay's name among those they recommended for the Ninth Circuit. On November 13, 2018, his nomination was sent to the Senate. President Trump nominated Bumatay to the seat vacated by Judge Alex Kozinski, who retired on December 18, 2017.

On January 3, 2019, his nomination was returned to the President under Rule XXXI, Paragraph 6 of the United States Senate.

On September 20, 2019, President Trump announced his intent to again nominate Bumatay. On October 15, 2019, his nomination was sent to the Senate. Bumatay was nominated to the seat being vacated by Judge Carlos Bea, who previously announced his intention to assume senior status upon confirmation of a successor. On October 30, 2019, a hearing on Bumatay's nomination was held before the Senate Judiciary Committee. On November 21, 2019, his nomination was reported out of committee by a 12–10 vote. On December 9, 2019, the Senate invoked cloture by a 47–41 vote. On December 10, 2019, his nomination was confirmed by a 53–40 vote. He received his judicial commission on December 12, 2019. Bumatay is the first Filipino American to serve as an Article III federal appellate judge and the first openly gay judge on the Ninth Circuit.

==== Notable cases ====
In February 2020, Bumatay dissented from a denial of rehearing en banc in which a three-judge panel ruled that the denial of sex-reassignment surgery to an Idaho prisoner violated the Eighth Amendment. In his dissent, Bumatay argued that "the panel's decision elevates innovative and evolving medical standards to be the constitutional threshold for prison medical care. In doing so, the panel minimizes the standard for establishing a violation of the Eighth Amendment." Bumatay's dissent in this case later inspired a silent walkout by the queer and trans law student group while delivering a Constitution Day lecture at Stanford Law School in 2021.

In September 2020, Bumatay dissented from a denial of rehearing en banc where a three-judge panel upheld the federal firearm ban statute for persons committed to a mental institution. Bumatay argued the panel ignored the "history and tradition" of the Second Amendment and improperly applied an intermediate scrutiny standard as standard of review.

In October 2020, Bumatay wrote for the unanimous panel when it found that an injunction to meet emission standard deadlines under the Clean Air Act could not be enforced against the United States Environmental Protection Agency after the EPA itself set new deadlines.

=== Withdrawn nomination to district court ===
On January 30, 2019, President Trump announced his intent to nominate Bumatay to a seat on the United States District Court for the Southern District of California. On February 6, 2019, his nomination was sent to the Senate. He was nominated to the seat vacated by Marilyn L. Huff, who assumed senior status on September 30, 2016. His nomination was withdrawn on October 15, 2019, when he was once again nominated to a seat on the Ninth Circuit.

== Personal life ==
Bumatay is a Filipino American and openly gay.

== See also ==
- Donald Trump judicial appointment controversies
- List of Asian American jurists
- List of first minority male lawyers and judges in the United States
- List of LGBT jurists in the United States

Legal offices
Preceded by Carlos Bea	Judge of the United States Court of Appeals for the Ninth Circuit; 2019–present	Incumbent
