= Nell Soto =

American politician

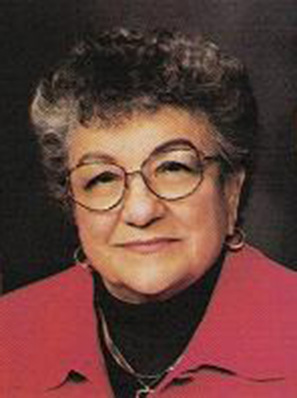
- Soto in 2000

Member of the California State Assembly from the 61st district
- In office December 4, 2006 – November 30, 2008
- Preceded by: Gloria Negrete McLeod
- Succeeded by: Norma J. Torres
- In office December 7, 1998 – March 13, 2000
- Preceded by: Fred Aguiar
- Succeeded by: Gloria Negrete McLeod

Member of the California Senate from the 32nd district
- In office March 13, 2000 – November 30, 2006
- Preceded by: Joe Baca
- Succeeded by: Gloria Negrete McLeod

Personal details
- Born: June 18, 1926 Pomona, California, US
- Died: February 26, 2009 (aged 82) Pomona, California, US
- Party: Democratic
- Spouse: Phil Soto (m. 1949; died 1997)
- Children: 6

Nell Soto (June 18, 1926 – February 26, 2009) was an American politician. Soto represented the 61st Assembly district (including parts of Los Angeles and San Bernardino Counties and the cities of Ontario, Pomona, Chino and Montclair) from 1998 to 2000 and again from 2006 to 2008. She served two terms as a state senator for the 32nd district from 2000 to 2006.

Soto served on the Pomona city council from 1986 until 1998. Soto also served on the South Coast Air Quality Management District. She was the first Latina from the San Gabriel Valley to be elected to that position. In 2006, she authored legislation that included expansion of the Nell Soto Teacher Involvement program, improving foster care licensing, and improving welfare to work programs.

Soto was married to Phil Soto, a pioneering Latino politician in California's history. Soto died on February 26, 2009, after months of declining health.

== Media coverage ==
In 2007, Soto was criticized for not being in Sacramento for 25 days while she was out sick, and collecting a total of $22,032 as a per diem. This money is a standard amount paid out to legislators not just for travel and living expenses, as she was criticized for, but also to pay for district office space, utilities, and staff resources etc. An assembly member maintains two offices, one in Sacramento and one in the district. Soto maintained these offices and staff during her recuperation period, and did not just use the money as accused by the reporter for personal apartment rent as alleged. "The rent for the apartment (and her offices) wasn't waived by the landlords" while she was at home recuperating, as explained by Greg Schmidt, the Secretary of the California State Senate.

California Assembly
Preceded by Fred Aguiar	California State Assemblyperson; 61st district December 7, 1998 - March 13, 2000	Succeeded by Gloria Negrete McLeod
Preceded by Gloria Negrete McLeod	California State Assemblyperson; 61st district December 4, 2006 - November 30, 2008	Succeeded by Norma Torres
California Senate
Preceded by Joe Baca	California State Senator; 32nd district March 13, 2000 - November 30, 2006	Succeeded by Gloria Negrete McLeod
