= Gloria Negrete McLeod =

American politician (born 1941)

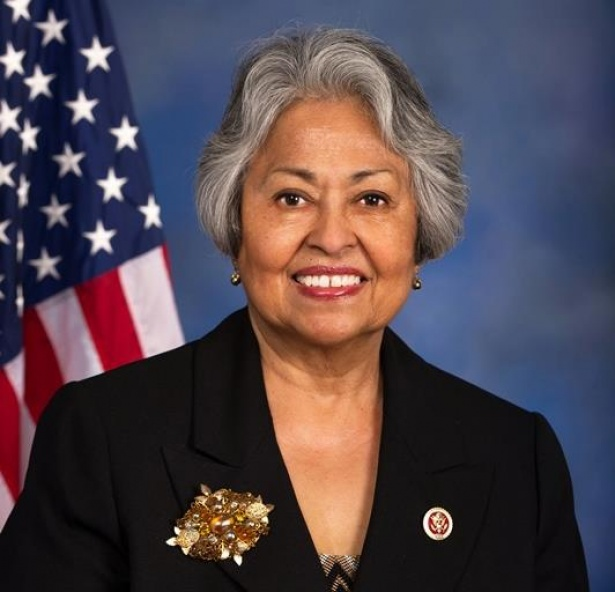
- Official portrait, 2013

Member of the U.S. House of Representatives from California's 35th district
- In office January 3, 2013 – January 3, 2015
- Preceded by: Joe Baca (redistricted)
- Succeeded by: Norma Torres

Member of the California Senate from the 32nd district
- In office December 4, 2006 – January 2, 2013
- Preceded by: Nell Soto
- Succeeded by: Norma Torres

Member of the California State Assembly from the 61st district
- In office December 4, 2000 – November 30, 2006
- Preceded by: Nell Soto
- Succeeded by: Nell Soto

Personal details
- Born: September 6, 1941 (age 85) Los Angeles, California, U.S.
- Party: Democratic
- Spouse: Gilbert McLeod
- Children: 10
- Education: Chaffey College

Gloria Negrete McLeod (born September 6, 1941) is an American politician who was the United States representative for California's 35th congressional district from 2013 to 2015. The district included portions of eastern Los Angeles County and western San Bernardino County. She was a California state senator, representing the 32nd district, from December 2006 until her election to Congress. Prior to that, she served in the California State Assembly from 2000 to 2006, after having lost in a 1998 bid for the Assembly. A resident of Chino, she defeated Joe Baca Jr., in the Democratic primary for the Senate seat. She defeated Joe Baca Sr. in her 2012 election to Congress. In February 2014, she announced her intention not to run for reelection, and instead to run for the San Bernardino County Board of Supervisors. Negrete McLeod lost the November election to Republican state Assemblyman Curt Hagman.

== Early life, education, and academic career ==
She was born in 1941 in Los Angeles, California. She was president of the board of Chaffey Community College (her alma mater) and was a Chaffey board member for five years. She was reelected to the board in 2015.

== California Assembly (2001–2007) ==
=== Elections ===
She ran for the 61st District in the California State Assembly in 1998 after incumbent Republican Fred Aguiar was term limited. She lost the Democratic vote to Nell Soto in the open primary 53%-47%. In 2000, she ran again and ranked first in the 7-candidate open primary with 28% of the overall vote and 62% of the Democratic vote. Republican Dennis Yates won the Republican vote with 35% and 19% of the overall vote, qualifying for the general election. In the November election, she defeated Yates 54%-43%. In 2002, she defeated Republican Matt Munson 62%-38%. In 2004, she defeated Republican Alan Wapner, an Ontario City Councilman, 64%-36%.

=== Tenure ===
She sponsored legislation to ban age discrimination. In late 2006, she was a key vote in favor of same-sex marriage.

=== Committee assignments ===
- Committee on Business and Professions (Chair)
- Committee on Public Employees (Chair)

== California Senate (2007–2013) ==
=== Elections ===
In 2006, Negrete McLeod decided to run for the California Senate in the 32nd district after incumbent Nell Soto was prevented from running for re-election due to term limits. She defeated Assemblyman Joe Baca Jr. in the Democratic primary 61%-39%. She won the November general election unopposed. In 2010, she won re-election to a second term with 68% of the vote.

=== District ===
The 32nd District stretches over two counties encompassing parts of San Bernardino County and Los Angeles County. In San Bernardino County, she represents the cities of Chino, Colton, Fontana, Montclair, Ontario, Rialto, and San Bernardino. In Los Angeles County, she represents the city of Pomona.

=== Issues ===
Negrete McLeod is actively involved in the cleanup of groundwater contamination. She focuses on current water supply.

In December 2009, California's weekly periodical Capitol Weekly gave her a 49 score, making her one of the most moderate Democrats in the legislature. The NARAL Pro-Choice America of California (2014, 2013, et al.) and Planned Parenthood of California have given her a perfect 100 rating (2012).

=== Committee assignments ===
- Budget and Fiscal Review
- Business, Professions and Economic Development
- Legislative Ethics Committee
- Master Plan for Higher Education Committee (Vice Chair)
- Public Employment and Retirement Committee (Chair)
- Sunset Review Committee
- Veterans Affairs Committee

== U.S. House of Representatives (2013–2015) ==
=== Election ===
In June 2011, after Negrete McLeod found out that the Citizens Redistricting Commission had drawn a new congressional district that was virtually coextensive with her state senate district, she announced she was running for it, saying, "I'm in, I'm in, I'm in, I'm in. There's nobody there." She was referring to the fact that there weren't any incumbent congressmen living in the district.

Negrete McLeod officially announced her candidacy for the newly redrawn and open 35th district on September 6, 2011. She faced Congressman Joe Baca in the primary. Baca's home is in the 31st District, but his old 43rd District took up almost 60% of the new 35th. In the open primary, Baca ranked first with 45% of the vote, Negrete McLeod ranked second with 36% of the vote, and Green party candidate Anthony Vieyra ranked last with 19% of the vote.

New York City Mayor Michael Bloomberg's Independence USA PAC spent more than $5 million supporting Negrete McLeod's candidacy. In the November general election, Negrete McLeod defeated Baca 56%-44%.

=== Committee assignments ===
- Committee on Agriculture
  - Subcommittee on Conservation, Energy, and Forestry
  - Subcommittee on Department Operations, Oversight, and Nutrition
  - Subcommittee on General Farm Commodities and Risk Management
- Committee on Veterans' Affairs
  - Subcommittee on Disability Assistance and Memorial Affairs
  - Subcommittee on Health

== Personal life ==
She and her husband Gilbert L. McLeod, a retired police lieutenant, have 10 children, 27 grandchildren, and 18 great-grandchildren.

== Election results ==
2000 Democratic Primary, State Assembly District 61

- 61.5% Gloria Negrete McLeod
- 38.5% Paul Vincent Avila

2006 Democratic Primary, State Senate District 32

- 61.4% Gloria Negrete McLeod
- 38.6% Joe Baca Jr.

2012 United States House of Representatives elections in California
Party	Candidate	Votes	%
Democratic	Gloria Negrete McLeod	79,698	55.9
Democratic	Joe Baca (Incumbent)	62,982	44.1
Total votes		142,680	100.0
Democratic hold			

== See also ==
- List of Hispanic and Latino Americans in the United States Congress
- Women in the United States House of Representatives

U.S. House of Representatives
Preceded by Maxine Waters	Member of the U.S. House of Representatives from California's 35th congressional district 2013–2015	Succeeded by Norma Torres
U.S. order of precedence (ceremonial)
Preceded by Andrea Seastrand as Former U.S. Representative	Order of precedence of the United States as Former U.S. Representative	Succeeded by TJ Cox as Former U.S. Representative
