= Hobart Mills, California =

Hobart Mills
- Former settlement
- Location in California
- Coordinates: 39°40′00″N 120°18′00″W
- Country: United States
- State: California
- County: Nevada County
- Elevation: 5,880 ft (1,790 m)

Hobart Mills is a former settlement in Nevada County, California. It is situated at an elevation of 5,880 ft (1,790 m) above sea level.

The town is named after Walter Scott Hobart, Sr. who operated a sawmill in the area since 1897. Hobart was a leading lumberman in the Lake Tahoe district from the 1860s until his death in 1892.

There was a post office in the town during the period of 1900 through 1938.

The politician Patrick J. Hillings was born in Hobart Mills.
