= George A. Kasem =

American politician

George Albert Kasem
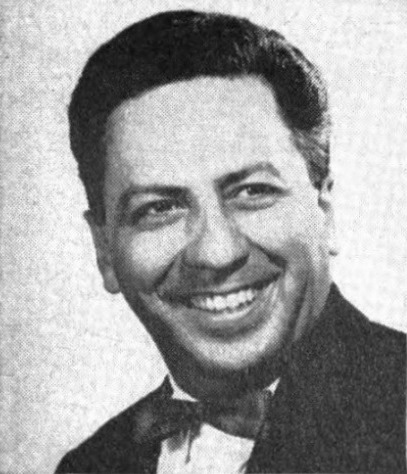
- Official portrait, 1959

Member of the U.S. House of Representatives from California's 25th district
- In office January 3, 1959 – January 3, 1961
- Preceded by: Patrick J. Hillings
- Succeeded by: John H. Rousselot

Personal details
- Born: George Albert Kasem; April 6, 1919 Drumright, Oklahoma, U.S.
- Died: February 11, 2002 (aged 82) Carlsbad, California, U.S.
- Party: Democratic
- Education: University of Southern California (BA 1949, LLB 1951)
- Profession: Politician; lawyer

Military service
- Allegiance: United States
- Branch/service: U.S. Army Air Forces
- Years of service: 1941–1945
- Battles/wars: World War II

George Albert Kasem (April 6, 1919 – February 11, 2002) was a U.S. representative from California's 25th congressional district. He was of Lebanese descent and was the first Lebanese American elected to the United States Congress, serving one term from 1959 to 1961.

== Early life ==
Born in Drumright, Oklahoma, Kasem was the son of Abdullah Kasem and Nabeha (Bader) Kasem. His family moved to Los Angeles, California when he was a boy, and Kasem graduated from John H. Francis Polytechnic High School in 1938. After graduation, Kasem worked as a clerk in a grocery store and became active in the local Retail Clerk's Union.

== Military service ==
In 1941, he joined the United States Army Air Forces for World War II. Kasem was trained as a weather observer and forecaster at military schools in Macon, Georgia and Grand Rapids, Michigan. He served in Sudan, Egypt, and Iraq, and remained in the service until being discharged at the end of the war in 1945.

== Post-World War II ==
He graduated from the University of Southern California in Los Angeles, California in 1949, and received his law degree from USC in 1951. Kasem was admitted to the bar and became an attorney in Baldwin Park.

== Member of Congress ==
Kasem was elected as a Democrat to the Eighty-sixth Congress (January 3, 1959 – January 3, 1961). He was an unsuccessful candidate for re-election to the Eighty-seventh Congress in 1960. During his term, Kasem advocated enhanced funding of the San Gabriel Valley Flood Control project, increased federal aid to education, and improved medical care for the elderly. He caused controversy while on a visit to Beirut, when he gave a speech in which he indicated that the creation of and support for Israel was the most effective way to bring about peace in the Middle East.

== Later career ==
After leaving Congress, Kasem resumed the practice of law. He served as commissioner in Citrus Municipal Court, West Covina, California from 1978 to 1984.

== Death ==
He died in Carlsbad, California on February 11, 2002.

== Family ==
Kasem was survived by his wife Catherine, to whom he was married for 54 years. They were the parents of a daughter, Janet Orr, and had two grandchildren.

== Electoral history ==
1958 election
Party	Candidate	Votes	%
Democratic	George A. Kasem	135,009	50.1
Republican	Prescott O. Lieberg	134,406	49.9
Total votes		269,415	100.0
Turnout			
Democratic gain from Republican			

1960 election
Party	Candidate	Votes	%
Republican	John H. Rousselot	182,545	53.6
Democratic	George A. Kasem (Incumbent)	158,289	46.4
Total votes		340,834	100.0
Turnout			
Republican gain from Democratic			

== See also ==
- List of Arab and Middle Eastern Americans in the United States Congress

U.S. House of Representatives
Preceded by Patrick J. Hillings	Member of the U.S. House of Representatives from California's 25th congressional district 1959–1961	Succeeded by John H. Rousselot
