= Charles E. Wiggins =

American judge (1927–2000)

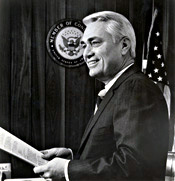

Senior Judge of the United States Court of Appeals for the Ninth Circuit
- In office December 31, 1996 – March 2, 2000

Judge of the United States Court of Appeals for the Ninth Circuit
- In office October 11, 1984 – December 31, 1996
- Appointed by: Ronald Reagan
- Preceded by: Seat established by 98 Stat. 333
- Succeeded by: Carlos Bea

Member of the U.S. House of Representatives from California
- In office January 3, 1967 – January 3, 1979
- Preceded by: Ronald B. Cameron
- Succeeded by: William E. Dannemeyer
- Constituency: 25th district (1967–1975); 39th district (1975–1979)

Personal details
- Born: Charles Edward Wiggins; December 3, 1927 El Monte, California, U.S.
- Died: March 2, 2000 (aged 72) Las Vegas, Nevada, U.S.
- Resting place: Arlington National Cemetery
- Party: Republican
- Education: University of Southern California (BS, LLB)

Charles Edward Wiggins (December 3, 1927 – March 2, 2000) was a United States representative from California, and later a United States circuit judge of the United States Court of Appeals for the Ninth Circuit. He was initially elected to California's 25th congressional district. The district was renumbered as California's 39th congressional district prior to the 1974 election.

== Education and career ==
Born in El Monte, California, Wiggins attended the public schools in El Monte. He was a First Lieutenant in the United States Army during World War II, from 1945 to 1948 and again from 1950 to 1952, thereafter receiving a Bachelor of Science degree from the University of Southern California in 1953 and a Bachelor of Laws from the University of Southern California Law School in 1956. He was a law clerk to Judge Swain of the Appellate Division, Los Angeles Superior Court. Wiggins then served as a member of the El Monte Planning Commission from 1954 to 1960, entering private practice in El Monte in 1957. He was an El Monte Councilman from 1960 to 1964, and mayor of El Monte from 1964 to 1966.

== Congressional service ==
Nixon Oval Office meeting with H.R. Haldeman "Smoking Gun" Conversation June 23, 1972

Wiggins was elected as a Republican to the Ninetieth and to the five succeeding Congresses (January 3, 1967 – January 3, 1979). He represented much of the territory that Richard Nixon represented in the House from 1947 to 1950.

Wiggins fiercely defended Nixon during debate on the House Judiciary Committee over Nixon's impeachment. However, Wiggins dropped his support after the revelation of the so-called "Smoking Gun" tape. He had actually been invited to the White House by Chief of Staff Alexander Haig to review the transcripts before their release. However, after reading the transcript, Wiggins concluded that the tapes proved that Nixon had indeed taken part in the plan to cover up the break-in and other illegal activities.

In a statement, Wiggins said that based on this evidence, "the facts then known to me now have changed." He added that it was now clear Nixon had a "plan of action" to cover up the break-in, and that alone would be "legally sufficient" to prove Nixon engaged in "a conspiracy to obstruct justice." While Wiggins believed "a competent counsel" could offer an innocent explanation for Nixon's actions in the Senate, he did not believe a protracted impeachment trial would be in the national interest. For that reason, he urged Nixon to resign and allow Vice President Gerald Ford to succeed him. He warned Nixon that if he did not resign, he was prepared to vote to impeach Nixon for obstruction of justice. He balked at supporting the other articles, citing concern about "unfortunate historical precedents." Several other Republicans on the Judiciary Committee followed his lead, a fact emphasized by The New York Times in its headline, "Wiggins for Impeachment; Others in G.O.P. Join Him."

Wiggins's earlier advocacy for Nixon saw his margin of victory reduced in the congressional elections of 1974. Re-elected in 1976, he was not a candidate for reelection to the Ninety-sixth Congress in 1978, instead returning to private practice in Los Angeles California from 1979 to 1982, in Washington, D.C. from 1982 to 1984, and in San Francisco, California in 1984.

== Federal judicial service ==
On August 1, 1984, Wiggins was nominated by President Ronald Reagan to a new seat on the United States Court of Appeals for the Ninth Circuit created by 98 Stat. 333. He was confirmed by the United States Senate on October 3, 1984, and received his commission on October 11, 1984. Wiggins assumed senior status on December 31, 1996, serving in that capacity until his death.

== Death ==
Wiggins died of cardiac arrest on March 2, 2000, in Las Vegas, Nevada, and was buried in Arlington National Cemetery. There is a Cenotaph monument at Savannah Memorial Park in Rosemead, California.

== Electoral history ==
1966 election
Party	Candidate	Votes	%
Republican	Charles E. Wiggins	70,154	52.6
Democratic	Ronald B. Cameron (Incumbent)	63,345	47.4
Total votes		133,499	
Republican gain from Democratic			

1968 election
Party	Candidate	Votes	%
Republican	Charles E. Wiggins (Incumbent)	141,600	68.6
Democratic	Keith F. Shirey	64,732	31.4
Total votes		206,332	100.0
Turnout			
Republican hold			

1968 election
Party	Candidate	Votes	%
Republican	Charles E. Wiggins (Incumbent)	141,600	68.6
Democratic	Keith F. Shirey	64,732	31.4
Total votes		206,332	100.0
Turnout			
Republican hold			

1970 election
Party	Candidate	Votes	%
Republican	Charles E. Wiggins (Incumbent)	116,169	63.3
Democratic	Leslie W. "Les" Craven	64,386	35.1
American Independent	Kevin Scanlon	2,994	1.6
Total votes		183,549	100.0
Turnout			
Republican hold			

1972 election
Party	Candidate	Votes	%
Republican	Charles E. Wiggins (Incumbent)	115,908	64.9
Democratic	Leslie W. "Les" Craven	50,015	31.9
American Independent	Alfred Romirez	5,541	3.1
Total votes		171,464	100.0
Turnout			
Republican hold			

1974 United States House of Representatives elections in California
Party	Candidate	Votes	%
Republican	Charles E. Wiggins	87,995	55.2
Democratic	William E. "Bill" Farris	64,735	40.4
American Independent	Pat P. Scalera	6,967	4.4
Total votes		159,337	100.0
Republican hold			

1976 United States House of Representatives elections in California
Party	Candidate	Votes	%
Republican	Charles E. Wiggins (Incumbent)	122,657	58.6
Democratic	William E. "Bill" Farris	86,745	41.4
Total votes		209,402	100.0
Republican hold			

== Sources ==
- "Charles Edward Wiggins". Biographical Directory of the United States Congress.

U.S. House of Representatives
Preceded by Ronald B. Cameron	Member of the U.S. House of Representatives from California's 25th congressional district 1967–1975	Succeeded by Edward R. Roybal
Preceded by Andrew J. Hinshaw	Member of the U.S. House of Representatives from California's 39th congressional district 1975–1979	Succeeded by William Dannemeyer
Legal offices
Preceded by Seat established by 98 Stat. 333	Judge of the United States Court of Appeals for the Ninth Circuit; 1984–1996	Succeeded by Carlos Bea
