= Patrick J. Hillings =

American politician

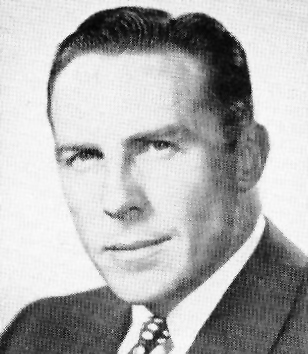
- Official portrait, 1953

Member of the U.S. House of Representatives from California
- In office January 3, 1951 – January 3, 1959
- Preceded by: Richard Nixon
- Succeeded by: George A. Kasem
- Constituency: 12th district (1951–1953); 25th district (1953–1959)

Personal details
- Born: Patrick Jerome Hillings; February 19, 1923 Hobart Mills, California, US
- Died: July 20, 1994 (aged 71) Palm Desert, California, US
- Resting place: Arlington National Cemetery
- Party: Republican
- Education: University of Southern California (BA, JD)

Military service
- Allegiance: United States
- Branch/service: United States Army
- Years of service: 1943–1947
- Rank: Sergeant
- Unit: Signal Corps
- Battles/wars: World War II

Patrick Jerome Hillings (February 19, 1923 – July 20, 1994) was an American lawyer, World War II veteran, and politician who served four terms as a Republican U.S. Representative from California. He succeeded Richard M. Nixon in Congress and was initially elected to California's 12th congressional district, which was renumbered as California's 25th congressional district prior to the 1952 election.

== Early life and career ==
Hillings was born in 1923 in Hobart Mills, California, where he attended the public schools. He attended the University of Southern California until March 1943, when he entered the United States Army Signal Corps. He was stationed in the South Pacific and served as a sergeant in the Intelligence Service until February 1946.

Returning to USC, Hillings received a Bachelor of Arts degree in 1947 and a Juris Doctor degree in 1949. He was admitted to the bar in 1949 and commenced the practice of law in Arcadia, California. He served as a delegate to the Republican National Conventions in 1952, 1956, 1960, and 1964 and supported Dwight D. Eisenhower (twice), Nixon, and Barry Goldwater, respectively.

== Congress ==
Hillings was elected to the Eighty-second and to the three succeeding Congresses (January 3, 1951 – January 3, 1959) from a seat vacated by Richard Nixon when he ran successfully for the U.S. Senate in 1950.

After four terms in the House of Representatives, Hillings did not seek renomination in 1958, but was an unsuccessful candidate for Attorney General of California, an office vacated by Edmund G. "Pat" Brown Sr. in his successful bid for governor. Hillings was defeated by Democrat Stanley Mosk, who would later become the longest-serving justice in the history of the California Supreme Court.

=== Civil Rights Act ===
Hillings cast no vote on the Civil Rights Act of 1957.

== Later career ==
After his unsuccessful bid for attorney general, Hillings resumed his law practice in Los Angeles. He served as chairman of the Republican Central Committee of Los Angeles County from 1960 to 1961.

In 1970, he ran in a special Republican primary to fill a vacancy caused by the death of Glenard P. Lipscomb in California's 24th congressional district, but was defeated for the nomination by John H. Rousselot, who went on to win the special general election. Hillings directed the presidential campaign of Ronald Reagan in Florida in from 1979 to 1980.

== Retirement and death ==
Hillings resided in Los Angeles until his death in Palm Desert, California in 1994 aged 71. His remains were interred in Arlington National Cemetery.

== Electoral history ==
1950 United States House of Representatives elections
Party	Candidate	Votes	%
Republican	Patrick J. Hillings	107,933	60.1%
Democratic	Steve Zetterberg	71,682	39.9%
Total votes		179,615	100.0%
Turnout			
Republican hold			

1952 election
Party	Candidate	Votes	%
Republican	Patrick J. Hillings (Incumbent)	135,465	64.3
Democratic	Woodrow Wilson Sayre	75,125	35.7
Total votes		210,590	100.0
Turnout			
Republican hold			

1954 election
Party	Candidate	Votes	%
Republican	Patrick J. Hillings (Incumbent)	113,027	65.2
Democratic	John S. Sobieski	60,370	34.8
Total votes		173,397	100.0
Turnout			
Republican hold			

1956 election
Party	Candidate	Votes	%
Republican	Patrick J. Hillings (Incumbent)	166,305	63.8
Democratic	John S. Sobieski	94,180	36.2
Total votes		260,485	100.0
Turnout			
Republican hold			

U.S. House of Representatives
Preceded by Richard Nixon	Member of the U.S. House of Representatives from California's 12th congressional district 1951–1953	Succeeded by Allan O. Hunter
New district	Member of the U.S. House of Representatives from California's 25th congressional district 1953–1959	Succeeded by George A. Kasem
