= Phil Soto =

American politician

Member of the California State Assembly from the 50th district
- In office January 7, 1963 - January 2, 1967
- Preceded by: Ronald B. Cameron
- Succeeded by: William Campbell

Personal details
- Born: March 3, 1926 Los Angeles, California
- Died: November 4, 1997 (aged 71) Pomona, California, US
- Party: Democratic
- Spouse: Nell Soto (m.1949)
- Children: 6

Military service
- Branch/service: United States Air Force
- Battles/wars: World War II

Philip Soto (March 3, 1926 – November 4, 1997) was one of the first Latinos elected to the California State Legislature in the twentieth century and was an early role model for contemporary Latino politicians.

Born in Los Angeles' Boyle Heights neighborhood, Soto served as a bombardier in the Army Air Corps in the South Pacific during World War II. Afterwards, he helped organize the GI Forum, a foundation for Hispanic American veterans.

Soto was a driving force behind the establishment of cityhood for La Puente, California, a formerly unincorporated area of East Los Angeles. He served on the La Puente City Council from 1958 to 1962, before he was elected to the 50th Assembly District surrounding La Puente in the 1962 election. Soto represented the La Puente area in the California Assembly for two two-year terms, from 1962 to 1966. He and another Latino Democrat from the San Gabriel Valley, John Moreno, were the first Latinos elected into statewide office in California in the 20th century.

Soto was active in union and civil rights causes, and marched with Cesar Chavez from Delano to Sacramento in March and April 1966, one of the United Farm Workers' most famous workers' rights demonstrations. In a show of support, he voluntarily spent a night in jail with Chavez, and later spent another night in jail with UFW President Dolores Huerta after she was arrested for organizing farm workers.

He later was appointed by President Lyndon B. Johnson to help set up economic development and job training programs in East Los Angeles. Soto retired in 1988 as director of the Small Business Administration's minority business development program.

Soto was the founder and president of the La Puente Democratic Club, served as local campaign manager for the presidential campaign of John F. Kennedy and was an advisor for Robert F. Kennedy's presidential campaign.

Soto died of cancer at his home in Pomona, California, on November 4, 1997, at the age of 71. He was married to Nell Soto, who later also served in the California State Legislature.
