= Carlos Bea =

American judge (born 1934)

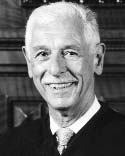

Senior Judge of the United States Court of Appeals for the Ninth Circuit
- Incumbent
- Assumed office December 12, 2019

Judge of the United States Court of Appeals for the Ninth Circuit
- In office October 1, 2003 – December 12, 2019
- Appointed by: George W. Bush
- Preceded by: Charles E. Wiggins
- Succeeded by: Patrick J. Bumatay

Personal details
- Born: Carlos Tiburcio Bea; April 18, 1934 (age 91) San Sebastián, Spain
- Party: Republican
- Education: Stanford University (BA, JD)

Carlos Tiburcio Bea (born April 18, 1934) is an American judge and lawyer. He is a senior United States circuit judge of the United States Court of Appeals for the Ninth Circuit. He was appointed to that court by President George W. Bush in 2003 to replace Judge Charles Edward Wiggins.

== Biography ==
Bea was born in San Sebastian, Spain and emigrated with his family in 1939 to Cuba. While present under a non-immigrant visa, he studied at Stanford University and received his Bachelor of Arts degree there in 1956. He joined Delta Tau Delta International Fraternity while at Stanford. In 1952, Bea represented Cuba as a member of the country's basketball team in the Helsinki Olympics. Upon his return, he was put into deportation proceedings for allegedly avoiding the draft. Bea suggested to the immigration judge that he be drafted to cure the apparent violation, but the judge refused as the Korean War had already ended. Bea won his appeal at the Board of Immigration Appeals, opining that the lower court had abused its discretion. After having his residency reinstated and accumulating the requisite physical presence, Bea petitioned for and became a naturalized citizen in 1959. He attended Stanford Law School and received his Juris Doctor in 1958. He was in private practice in California after that, but in 1990 he became a trial judge on the San Francisco County Superior Court. He served there until his appointment to the Ninth Circuit in 2003.

== Federal judicial service ==
Bea had previously been nominated in 1991 to be a federal district judge for the United States District Court for the Northern District of California by President George H. W. Bush, but he never received a vote in the Senate.

Bush nominated Bea to the Ninth Circuit on April 11, 2003. The United States Senate confirmed him on September 29, 2003 by a 86–0 vote. Bea received his commission on October 1, 2003. In June 2019, Bea announced his intention to assume senior status upon the nomination, confirmation and appointment of a successor. He assumed senior status on December 12, 2019.

== Personal life ==
His son is Olympic rower Sebastian Bea. The Bea family lived in the historic Casebolt House (built c. 1865) in Cow Hollow, San Francisco.

== See also ==
- List of Hispanic and Latino American jurists

Legal offices
Preceded by Charles E. Wiggins	Judge of the United States Court of Appeals for the Ninth Circuit; 2003–2019	Succeeded by Patrick J. Bumatay
