= Norma Torres =

American politician (born 1965)

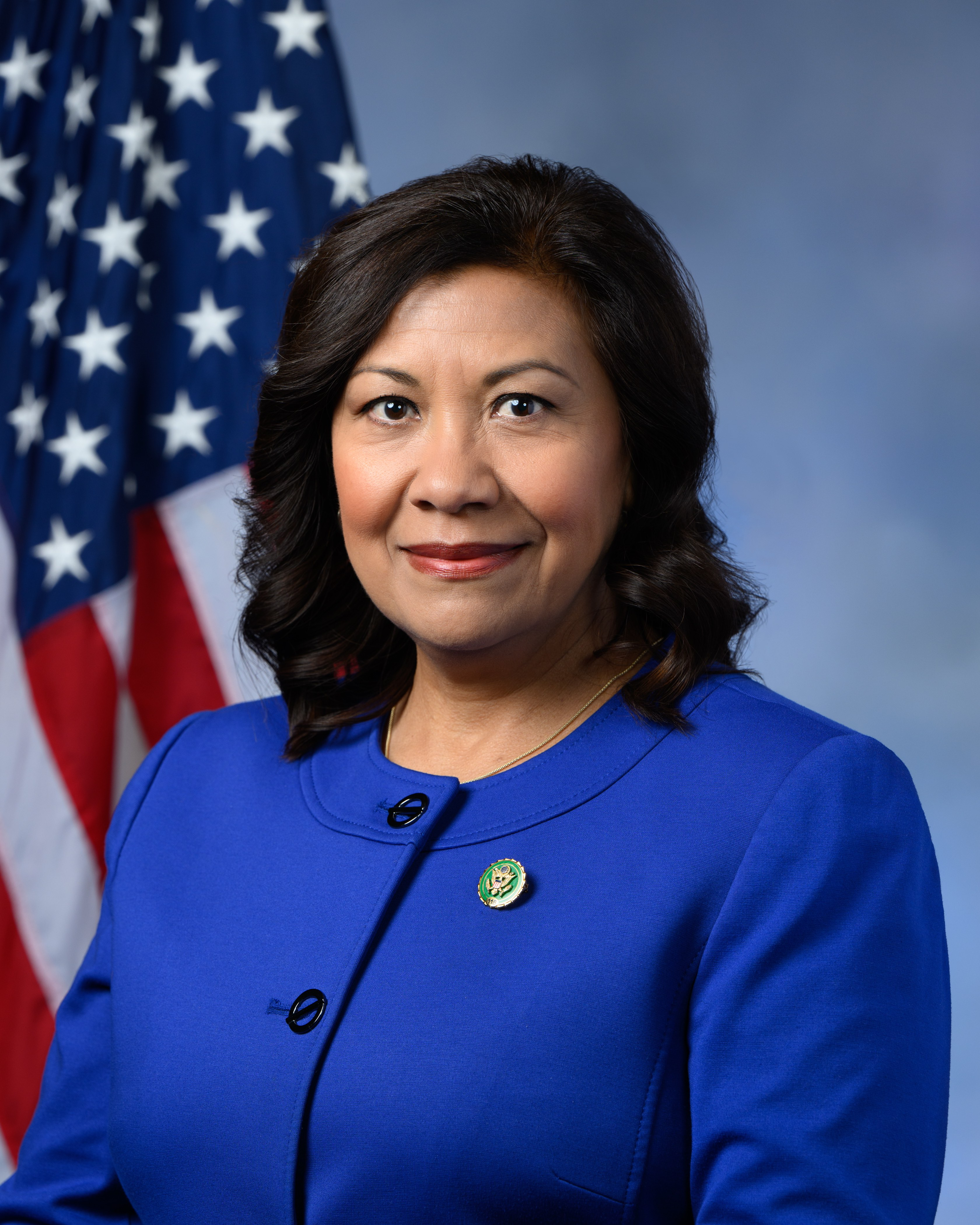
- Official portrait, 2023

Member of the U.S. House of Representatives from California's 35th district
- Incumbent
- Assumed office January 3, 2015
- Preceded by: Gloria Negrete McLeod

Member of the California State Senate from the 32nd district
- In office May 20, 2013 – November 30, 2014
- Preceded by: Gloria Negrete McLeod
- Succeeded by: Tony Mendoza (redistricted)

Member of the California State Assembly
- In office December 1, 2008 – May 20, 2013
- Preceded by: Nell Soto
- Succeeded by: Freddie Rodriguez
- Constituency: 61st district (2008–2012); 52nd district (2012–2013)

Mayor of Pomona
- In office April 3, 2006 – December 1, 2008
- Preceded by: Edward Cortez
- Succeeded by: Elliot Rothman

Member of the Pomona City Council from the 6th district
- In office January 8, 2001 – April 3, 2006
- Preceded by: Willie White
- Succeeded by: Steven Bañales

Personal details
- Born: Norma Judith Barillas; April 4, 1965 (age 61) Escuintla, Guatemala
- Party: Democratic
- Spouse: Louis Torres
- Children: 3
- Education: Mt. San Antonio College (attended); Rio Hondo College (attended); National Labor College (BA)
- Website: House website Campaign website
- Torres's voice Torres on 911 operators. Recorded July 11, 2019

Norma Judith Torres (née Barillas; born April 4, 1965) is an American politician. She is a member of the United States House of Representatives for California's 35th congressional district. Previously, she was a member of the California State Senate representing the 32nd district. She is a member of the Democratic Party.

== Early life and career ==
Torres was born Norma Judith Barillas in Guatemala. When she was five, she and her uncle came to the United States; her mother died a year later. She originally arrived on a tourist visa, but became a legal resident in her teens and gained citizenship in 1992.

Torres worked as a 9-1-1 dispatcher, and in 1994 led a campaign to require the hiring of bilingual 9-1-1 operators. She was an active member of AFSCME, serving as local 3090's shop steward.

=== Early political activities ===
She served on the Pomona city council before being elected the city's mayor in 2006. In 2008, Torres endorsed then-presidential candidate Barack Obama before Hillary Clinton withdrew from the race, and was a superdelegate to the Democratic National Convention. She was elected to the State Assembly in November 2008, filling the vacancy left by former legislator Nell Soto, who retired. She earned her bachelor's degree in labor studies from the now-defunct National Labor College in Maryland in 2012.

== U.S. House of Representatives ==
Torres was elected to the U.S. House of Representative for California's 35th congressional district in 2014, defeating Christina Gagnier (D) with 63.5% of the vote. She was reelected in 2016, defeating Tyler Fischella (R) with 72.4% of the vote. In 2018, Torres received 69.4% of the vote to defeat Christian Valiente (R), and in 2020, she defeated Republican Mike Cargile with 69.3%.

=== Tenure ===
After being reelected to the House in November 2022, Torres accused President Nayib Bukele of El Salvador of interfering in her race. Bukele had urged voters to oppose Torres.

=== Committee assignments ===
For the 119th Congress:

- Committee on Appropriations
  - Subcommittee on National Security, Department of State, and Related Programs
  - Subcommittee on Transportation, Housing and Urban Development, and Related Agencies
- Committee on House Administration
  - Subcommittee on Modernization and Innovation (Ranking Member)

=== Caucus memberships ===
- Black Maternal Health Caucus
- Congressional Asian Pacific American Caucus
- New Democrat Coalition
- Congressional Hispanic Caucus
- Congressional NextGen 9-1-1 Caucus

== Political positions ==
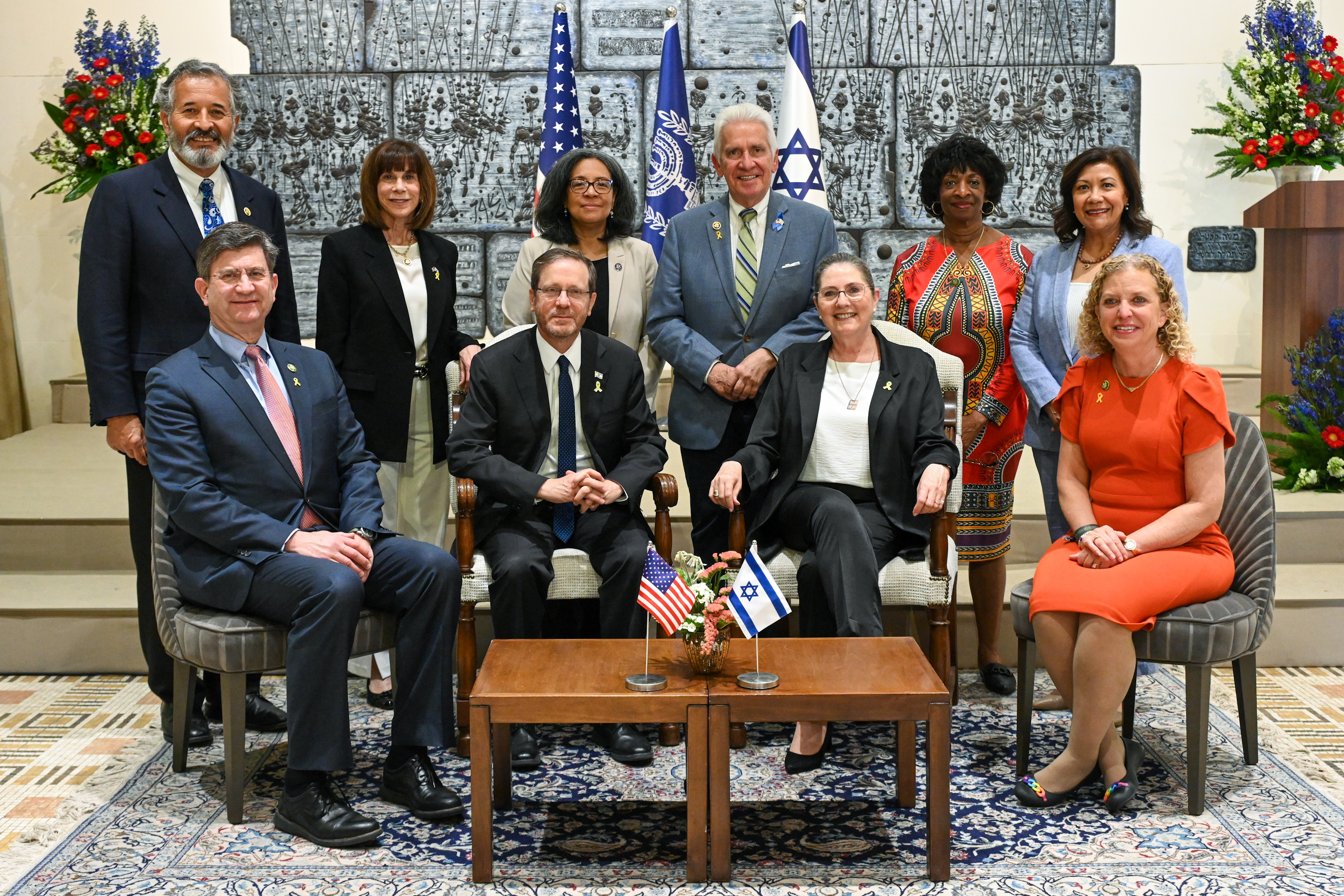
Torres and other members of the US Congress with Israeli President Isaac Herzog in Jerusalem, March 28, 2024

=== Abortion ===
As of 2025, Torres has a 100% rating from NARAL Pro-Choice America and an F grade from the Susan B. Anthony List for her abortion-related voting record. She opposed the overturning of Roe v. Wade, calling it "devastating" and saying it set back "our country decades, reversing so many years of hard-fought progress" for women.

== Personal life ==
Torres is married to Louis Torres. They live in Pomona, California. They have three sons, including Robert Torres, a former Pomona City Council member.

== Electoral history ==
2008 California Assembly election: District 61
Primary election
Party	Candidate	Votes	%
Democratic	Norma Torres	61,004	60.60%
Republican	Wendy Maier	33,284	33.00%
Libertarian	Michael Mendez	6,517	6.40%
Total votes		100,805	100

2010 California Assembly election: District 61
Primary election
Party	Candidate	Votes	%
Democratic	Norma Torres (incumbent)	43,813	60.16%
Republican	Ray Moors	29,009	39.84%
Total votes		72,822	100

2012 California Assembly election: District 52
Primary election
Party	Candidate	Votes	%
Democratic	Norma Torres (incumbent)	66,565	66.02%
Republican	Kenny Coble	34,267	33.98%
Total votes		100,832	100

2013 California Senate special election: District 32
Primary election
Party	Candidate	Votes	%
Democratic	Norma Torres	15,021	44.24%
Republican	Paul Leon	8,961	26.39%
Democratic	Larry Walker	4,620	13.61%
Democratic	Joanne Gilbert	2,327	6.85%
Republican	Kenny Coble	2,178	6.41%
Democratic	Paul Avila	845	2.49%
Total votes		33,952	100

US House election, 2014: California District 35
Primary election
Party	Candidate	Votes	%
Democratic	Norma Torres	17,996	65.68%
Democratic	Christina Gagnier	4,081	14.89%
Democratic	Scott Heydenfeldt	2,574	9.39%
Democratic	Anthony Vieyra	2,183	7.97%
Republican	Benjamin "Ben" Lopez (write-in)	567	2.07%
Total votes		27,401	100
General election
Democratic	Norma Torres	39,502	63.45%
Democratic	Christina Gagnier	22,753	36.55%
Total votes		62,255	100
Democratic hold			

US House election, 2016: California District 35
Primary election
Party	Candidate	Votes	%
Democratic	Norma Torres (incumbent)	65,226	75.57%
Republican	Tyler Fischella	21,089	24.43%
Total votes		86,315	100
General election
Democratic	Norma Torres (incumbent)	124,044	73.29%
Republican	Tyler Fischella	47,309	27.61%
Total votes		171,353	100
Democratic hold			

US House election, 2018: California District 35
Primary election
Party	Candidate	Votes	%
Democratic	Norma Torres (incumbent)	32,474	51.17%
Republican	Christian Valiente	21,572	33.99%
Democratic	Joe Baca	9,417	14.84%
Total votes		63,463	100
General election
Democratic	Norma Torres (incumbent)	103,420	69.40%
Republican	Christian Valiente	45,604	30.60%
Total votes		149,024	100
Democratic hold			

US House election, 2020: California District 35
Primary election
Party	Candidate	Votes	%
Democratic	Norma Torres (incumbent)	70,813	70.78%
Republican	Mike Cargile	29,234	29.22%
Total votes		100,047	100
General election
Democratic	Norma Torres (incumbent)	169,405	69.33%
Republican	Mark Cargile	74,941	30.67%
Total votes		244,346	100
Democratic hold			

US House election, 2022: California District 35
Primary election
Party	Candidate	Votes	%
Democratic	Norma Torres (incumbent)	37,554	54.34%
Republican	Mike Cargile	17,431	25.22%
Republican	Rafael Carcamo	7,619	11.03%
Republican	Bob Erbst	3,480	5.04%
Democratic	Lloyd Stevens	3,022	4.37%
Total votes		69,106	100
General election
Democratic	Norma Torres (incumbent)	75,121	57.36%
Republican	Mark Cargile	55,832	42.64%
Total votes		130,953	100
Democratic hold			

US House election, 2024: California District 35
Primary election
Party	Candidate	Votes	%
Democratic	Norma Torres (incumbent)	39,051	48.18%
Republican	Mike Cargile	32,082	39.58%
Democratic	Melissa May	6,432	7.94%
Republican	Vijal Suthar	3,491	4.31%
Total votes		81,056	100
General election
Democratic	Norma Torres (incumbent)	136,413	58.41%
Republican	Mark Cargile	97,142	41.59%
Total votes		233,555	100
Democratic hold			

== See also ==
- List of Hispanic and Latino Americans in the United States Congress
- Women in the United States House of Representatives

U.S. House of Representatives
Preceded by Gloria Negrete McLeod	Member of the U.S. House of Representatives from California's 35th congressional district 2015–present	Incumbent
U.S. order of precedence (ceremonial)
Preceded by Elise Stefanik	United States representatives by seniority 145th	Succeeded by Bonnie Watson Coleman
