= Buck McKeon =

American politician (born 1938)

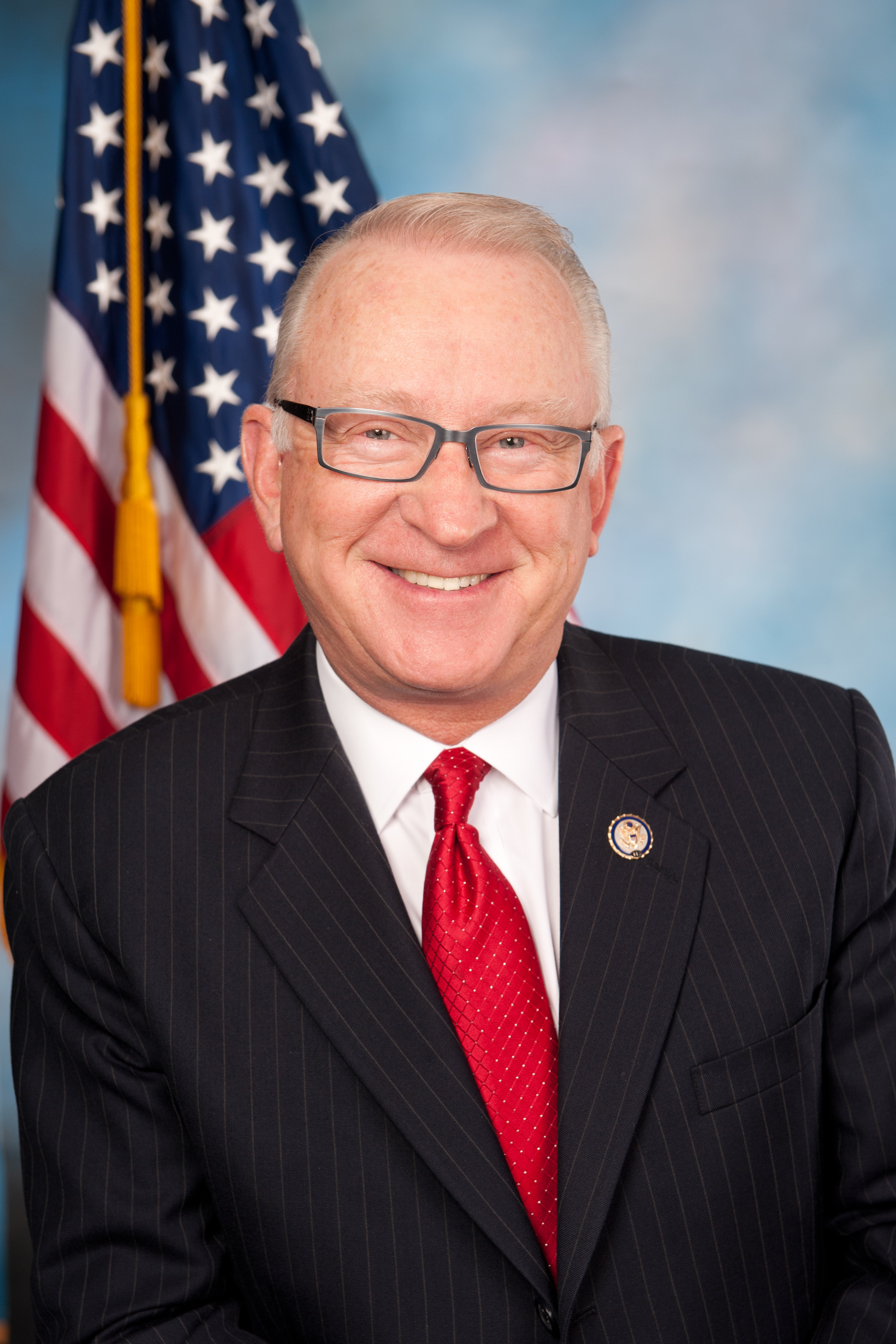
- Official portrait, 2011

Chair of the House Armed Services Committee
- In office January 3, 2011 – January 3, 2015
- Preceded by: Ike Skelton
- Succeeded by: Mac Thornberry

Ranking Member of the House Armed Services Committee
- In office June 9, 2009 – January 3, 2011
- Preceded by: John McHugh
- Succeeded by: Adam Smith

Ranking Member of the House Education Committee
- In office January 3, 2007 – June 9, 2009
- Preceded by: George Miller
- Succeeded by: John Kline

Chair of the House Education Committee
- In office February 2, 2006 – January 3, 2007
- Preceded by: John Boehner
- Succeeded by: George Miller

Member of the U.S. House of Representatives from California's 25th district
- In office January 3, 1993 – January 3, 2015
- Preceded by: Constituency established
- Succeeded by: Steve Knight

Personal details
- Born: Howard Philip McKeon; September 9, 1938 (age 87) Los Angeles, California, U.S.
- Party: Republican
- Spouse: Patricia Kunz
- Children: 6
- Education: Brigham Young University (BS)
- McKeon's voice McKeon opening a House Armed Services Committee hearing on the incoming budget sequestration in 2013. Recorded September 20, 2012

Howard Philip "Buck" McKeon (born September 9, 1938) is an American politician who served as a U.S. representative from California's 25th congressional district from 1993 to 2015. He is a member of the Republican Party. He is a former chairman of the House Armed Services Committee and the House Education Committee.

== Early life and education ==
Born in Tujunga, Los Angeles, California, McKeon graduated from Verdugo Hills High School. He spent two years as a Mormon missionary before enrolling at Brigham Young University. He later received his Bachelor of Science degree in animal husbandry in 1985, after previously putting his studies on hold to raise a family and establish his early business career.

== Early career ==
He was an owner of a Western-themed clothing retail chain, Howard & Phil's Western Wear. The business went bankrupt in 1999, though at that point he hadn't worked for the chain in years. He had also worked as the chairman of a small, regional bank. McKeon gained his first political experience when he was elected to the William S. Hart High School District board of trustees.

McKeon was a one-term councilman of Santa Clarita, being one of the first to hold that post after the city incorporated in 1987. He held that position until entering the House.

== U.S. House of Representatives ==
=== Committee assignments ===
- Committee on Armed Services (Chair)
  - As chair of the full committee, McKeon was entitled to sit as an ex officio member of all subcommittees.
- Committee on Education and the Workforce
  - Subcommittee on Higher Education and Workforce Training

In 2009, McKeon served as ranking member of the House Committee on Education and Labor. In June, President Barack Obama nominated Representative John M. McHugh of New York, who was the ranking Republican on the Armed Services Committee, as Secretary of the Army. On June 9, the House Republican leadership appointed McKeon as the ranking Republican on the Armed Services Committee. Under rules of the House of Representatives, McKeon was required to step down from his position as ranking member of the Education and Labor Committee, though he continued to serve on the committee. McKeon was named chairman of the Committee on Armed Services in January, following the Republican takeover of the House in the November 2010 elections.

As a member of the House, he made education and defense issues two of his main priorities. He was greatly involved in the reform of the Student Loan Aid Program, which reduced interest rates but increased federal control over education policy, such as teacher training. He also supported a strong national defense budget. Along with Dean Gallo of New Jersey, McKeon introduced the Religious Freedom Restoration Act on March 11, 1993. McKeon was a member of the Republican Study Committee.

=== Political campaigns ===
In 1992, California gained seven additional seats following the census. A new 25th District was created in the Santa Clarita and Antelope Valleys in north Los Angeles County and the communities of Chatsworth, Granada Hills, Northridge, and Porter Ranch in the northwestern San Fernando Valley. McKeon was thus the first congressman to represent the new district.

In the 2002 reapportionment, the San Fernando Valley and portions of the Antelope Valley were removed from the 25th District. To make up for the loss of population, the district was pushed all the way to the Nevada border, taking in all of Inyo and Mono counties and about half of the land area within San Bernardino County. The Los Angeles County portion of the district still included the cities of Santa Clarita, Palmdale, and part of the city of Lancaster.

In 2012, the California Citizens Redistricting Commission drew new lines for the 25th district, pushing it well to the north and making it somewhat more compact. It retained its share of Los Angeles County, added parts of Porter Ranch and Chatsworth in the San Fernando Valley, and expanded into parts of Ventura County, including most of Simi Valley.

During the 2006 election cycle, McKeon received 60% of the vote in his district, defeating Democrat Robert Rodriguez and Libertarian David Erickson. The district has been considered to be "safe" for the Republican Party because it included predominantly Republican areas in the Antelope and Santa Clarita Valleys and conservative rural areas of the High Sierra and desert regions of California. McKeon handily won reelection with 58% of the vote in 2008, even though Democratic presidential candidate Barack Obama carried the district over his Republican rival John McCain.

McKeon's campaigns received the greatest financial support from the defense industry, especially aerospace companies such as Lockheed Martin, Northrop Grumman, and Boeing. Additionally, he is endorsed by the NRA Political Victory Fund, the National Federation of Independent Business, and the California Pro-Life Council.

=== Political positions ===
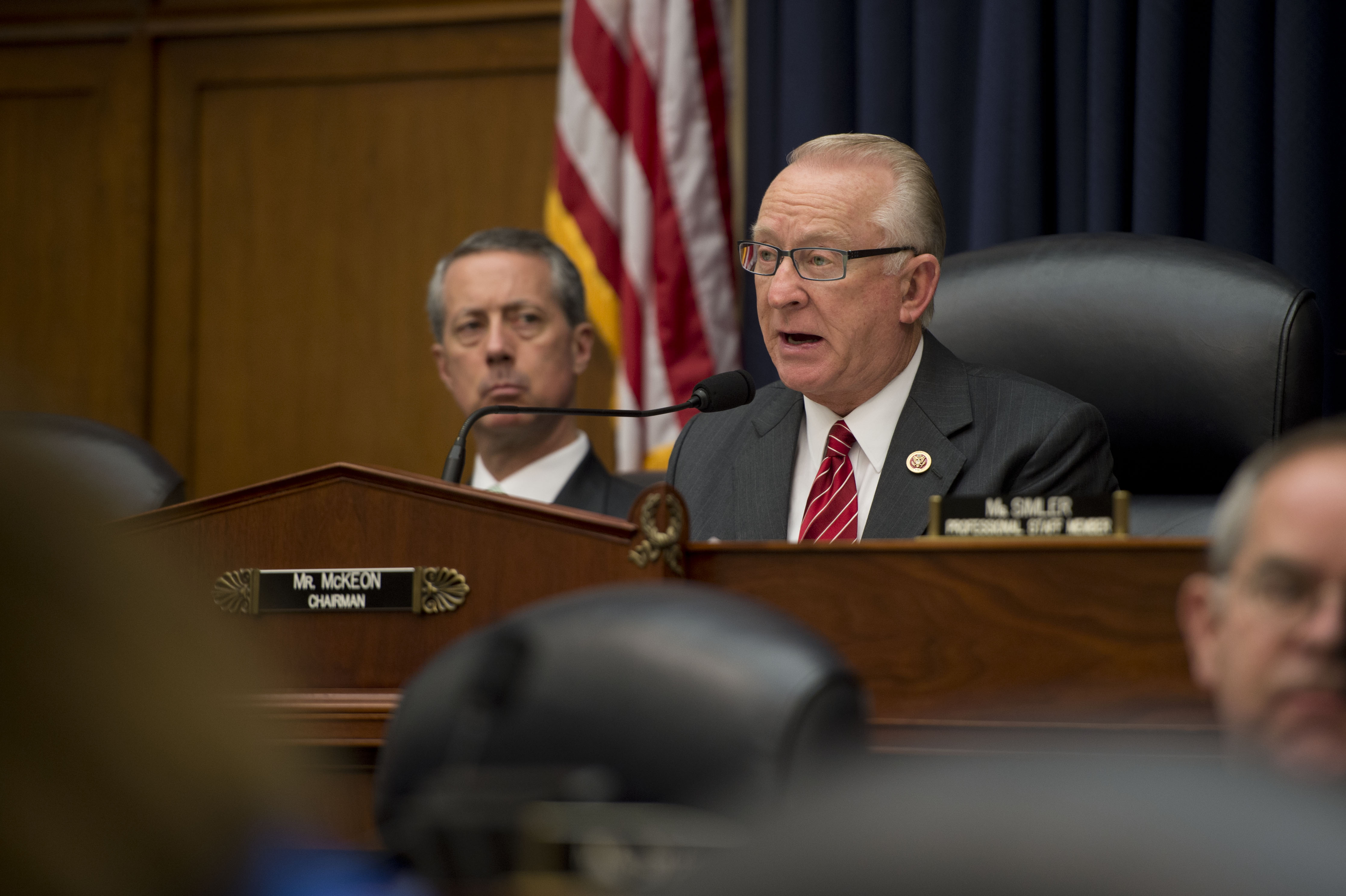
Chairman Buck McKeon questions Secretary Chuck Hagel during a testimony

McKeon served as the chairman on the Armed Services Committee. He held the position from January 2011 to January 2015. He was previously the ranking member of the committee. California's 25th District holds several military bases, including Fort Irwin, Edwards Air Force Base, Naval Air Weapons Station China Lake, and the Marine Mountain Warfare Training Center. Although he has spoken strongly against Obama's budgets and governmental support of the economy and has encouraged reducing spending, McKeon opposed cutting the military budget, stating, "a defense budget in decline portends an America in decline."

McKeon voted in favor of American military intervention in Afghanistan and Iraq, as well as Barack Obama's Afghanistan "surge" strategy, and has voted for increasing money and supplies to troops there. He has gone on record saying that withdrawal from Afghanistan should be conditions-based, and done with full consultation with senior military leadership. In a statement from May 2010, McKeon outlined his personal philosophy on the role of the United States and its military, calling for a return to "peace through strength" and Reagan-esque policies, including full financial and material support for the military in its current wars, keeping Guantanamo Bay open, and military posturing.

In a speech before the Foreign Policy Initiative research group in 2010, McKeon called for increases in government spending on defense above Obama's budgets. He has also called on Congress to "embrace and build on" Robert Gates' plan to find $100 billion in savings in the defense budget.

In 2011 McKeon organized a fundraiser for the "Lucky 13" Republican freshmen on the House Armed Services Committee to get contributions from defense contractor political action committees.

In 2011, McKeon proposed Section 1034, an amendment to the National Defense Authorization Act for Fiscal Year 2012 that would have inserted the language "Congress affirms that ... the President has the authority to use all necessary and appropriate force during the current armed conflict with al-Qaeda, the Taliban, and associated forces pursuant to" the Authorization for Use of Military Force Against Terrorists (AUMF Against Terrorists) (Public Law 107–40) and stated that "the current armed conflict includes nations, organization, and persons who (A) are part of, or are substantially supporting, al-Qaeda, the Taliban, or associated forces that are engaged in hostilities against the United States or its coalition partners; or (B) have engaged in hostilities or have directly supported hostilities in aid of a nation, organization, or person described in subparagraph (A)." McKeon also offered an NDAA proposal that "contained a provision designed to require military detention of terrorism suspects, even those arrested domestically and even those who are U.S. citizens," but this was later watered down to a proposal stating that the president, under the AUMF Against Terrorists, had "the authority to detain belligerents...until the termination of hostilities. President Obama did not request that this language be included, and in a statement the White House issued a veto threat and said "The Administration strongly objects to section 1034 which, in purporting to affirm the conflict, would effectively recharacterize its scope and would risk creating confusion regarding applicable standards." The expansive language of Section 1034 was criticized in a New York Times editorial, which called it an unnecessary and dangerous proposal and said that it was "wildly expansive authorization would, in essence, make the war on terror a permanent and limitless aspect of life on earth, along with its huge potential for abuse." The American Civil Liberties Union also criticized McKeon's proposal. U.S. Representative Justin Amash (Republican of Michigan) and Representative Barbara Lee (Democrat of California) offered an amendment that would remove McKeon's Section 1034 (the "so-called 'endless war'" provision) from the NDAA bill. The House rejected the Amash-Lee amendment by a 234–187, with most Democrats voting in favor and most Republicans voting against. President Obama ultimately signed the 2012 NDAA with the contentious provisions, but in February 2012, issued a set of broad waivers that allowed U.S. law enforcement agencies "to retain custody of al-Qaeda terrorism suspects rather than turn them over to the military" as contemplated by the NDAA. Human Rights Watch said that Obama's waiver was "essentially a 3,450-word line-item veto, rendering the mandatory military detention provision mostly moot."

McKeon said if forced to choose between tax increases and cuts to the Pentagon budget, he would choose tax increases. However he would prefer to cut entitlement spending instead. In 2012, McKeon sought a one-year fix to stave off the defense budget cuts from sequestration, although he had previously voted for the Budget Control Act of 2011, which included sequestration. McKeon led efforts by some Republicans that contributed to replacement of the sequester cuts for 2014 and 2015 with the Bipartisan Budget Act of 2013. In 2014 McKeon said of Obama's plan to raise taxes on banks and millionaires, "I think that would be wonderful but it's not going to happen". He dismissed calls to replace USMC jet fighters destroyed by the Taliban in the September 2012 Camp Bastion raid.

McKeon opposed abortion. He was endorsed by the California Pro-Life Council. He opposed "amnesty for those who have entered the country illegally" and emphasized border security. The congressman threatened to derail the 2012 defense authorization bill unless it contained provisions prohibiting military chaplains from officiating at same-sex marriages and restricting access to the civil court system by persons suspected of terrorism.

McKeon introduced the National Defense Authorization Act for Fiscal Year 2015, a bill that the House Armed Services Committee renamed in his honor. According to the House Armed Services Committee, which oversaw the legislation, the bill "will be the comprehensive legislation to authorize the budget authority of the Department of Defense and the national security programs of the Department of Energy." The total appropriations that are authorized amount to approximately $600 billion for fiscal year 2015.

=== Countrywide Financial loan ===
In January 2012, it was reported that McKeon received a so-called "VIP" or "Friends of Angelo" loan from troubled mortgage lender Countrywide Financial, in which loans were granted at lower interest rates than were available to the public. Former Countrywide CEO Angelo Mozilo created the program to boost the company's standing with politicians, celebrities and well-connected business figures. The congressman received a $315,000 loan from Countrywide at below-market rates in the late 1990s. A congressional probe identified an internal Countrywide email regarding McKeon's loan that stated: "Per Angelo—'take off 1 point, no garbage fees, approve the loan and make it a no doc.'" McKeon and names of other legislators who received similar loans were subsequently referred to the House Committee on Oversight and Government Reform as part of an ethics investigation into improper gifts. McKeon denied knowing that he was part of Countrywide Financial's special loan program. In a response to a press inquiry about his knowledge of the loan discounts McKeon stated, "If I had known we had got a good deal then I would have gotten all my loans from Countrywide."

== Personal life ==
McKeon is married to the former Patricia Kunz. They have six children and 31 grandchildren. They are members of the Church of Jesus Christ of Latter-day Saints.

Patricia Kunz McKeon was active in her husband's political campaigns, serving as treasurer and drawing a salary, which has been the subject of controversy. According to a study by Citizens for Responsibility and Ethics in Washington, McKeon's campaign committees paid her a total of $263,168 between 2001 and 2006 - the highest such payment in the group of Representatives studied by CREW. In the 2005-2006 election cycle she was paid $110,000 to do fundraising and prepare campaign finance reports. She has also worked as a lobbyist.

== See also ==
U.S. House of Representatives
Preceded by Edward Roybal	Member of the U.S. House of Representatives from California's 25th congressional district 1993–2015	Succeeded by Steve Knight
Preceded by John Boehner	Chair of the House Education Committee; 2006–2007	Succeeded by George Miller
Preceded by George Miller	Ranking Member of the House Education Committee; 2007–2009	Succeeded by John Kline
Preceded by John McHugh	Ranking Member of the House Armed Services Committee; 2009–2011	Succeeded by Adam Smith
Preceded by Ike Skelton	Chair of the House Armed Services Committee; 2011–2015	Succeeded by Mac Thornberry
U.S. order of precedence (ceremonial)
Preceded by Michael C. Burgess as Former U.S. Representative	Order of precedence of the United States as Former U.S. Representative	Succeeded by Greg Walden as Former U.S. Representative
