= Indio Hills, California =

Indio Hills
- census-designated place
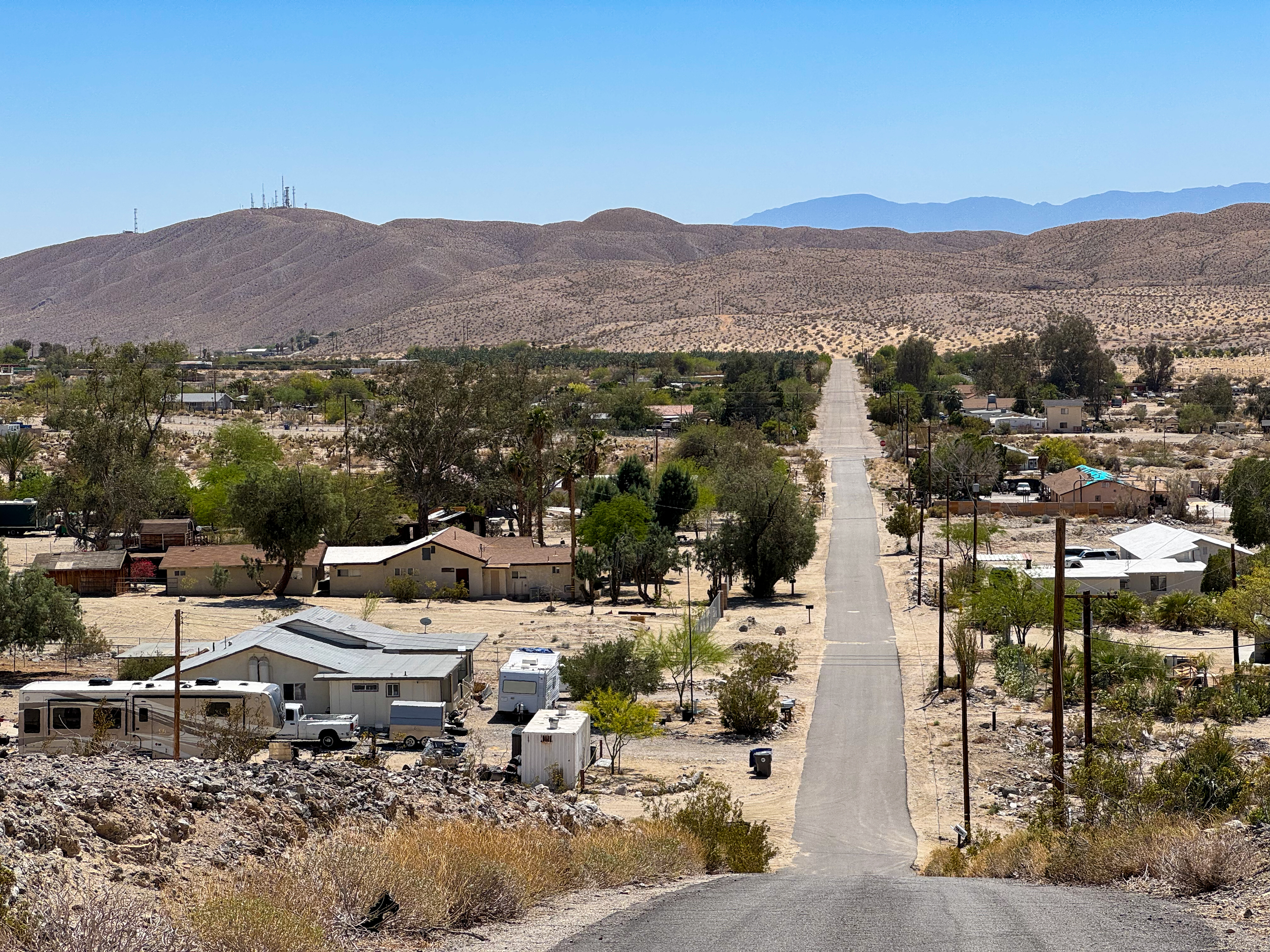
- Indio Hills, California with Indio Hills and Santa Rosa Mountains

- Location of Indio Hills in Riverside County, California.

- Position in California.
- Coordinates: 33°50′30″N 116°14′53″W
- Country: United States
- State: California
- County: Riverside

Area
  - Total: 21.861 sq mi (56.621 km^{2})
  - Land: 21.861 sq mi (56.621 km^{2})
  - Water: 0 sq mi (0 km^{2}) 0%
- Elevation: 1,017 ft (310 m)

Population (2020)
  - Total: 1,048
  - Density: 47.94/sq mi (18.51/km^{2})
- Time zone: UTC-8 (Pacific (PST))
  - Summer (DST): UTC-7 (PDT)
- GNIS feature ID: 2583039

Indio Hills is a census-designated place in Riverside County, California. Indio Hills sits at an elevation of 1,017 feet (310 m). The 2020 United States census reported Indio Hills's population was 1,048.

== Geography ==
According to the United States Census Bureau, the CDP covers an area of 21.9 square miles (56.6 km^{2}), all of it land.

== Demographics ==
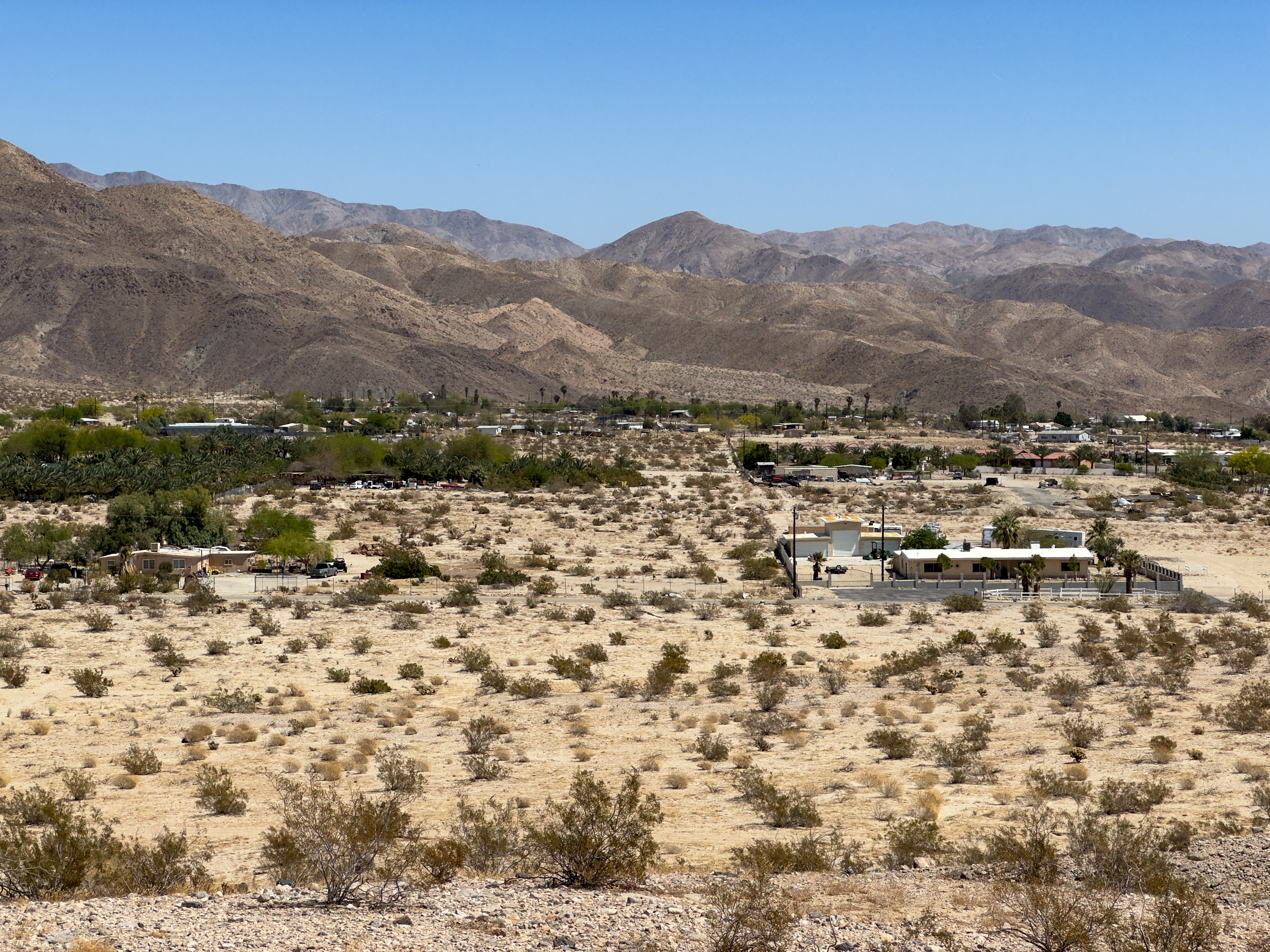
Indio Hills, California with Little San Bernardino Mountains

Historical population
Census	Pop.	Note	%±
2010	972		—
2020	1,048		7.8%
U.S. Decennial Census; 1860–1870 1880-1890; 1900 1910 1920; 1930 1940 1950; 1960 1970 1980; 1990 2000 2010

Indio Hills first appeared as a census designated place in the 2010 U.S. census.

=== Racial and ethnic composition ===
Indio Hills CDP, California – Racial and ethnic composition Note: the US Census treats Hispanic/Latino as an ethnic category. This table excludes Latinos from the racial categories and assigns them to a separate category. Hispanics/Latinos may be of any race.
Race / Ethnicity (NH = Non-Hispanic)	Pop 2010	Pop 2020	% 2010	% 2020
White alone (NH)	297	184	30.56%	17.56%
Black or African American alone (NH)	3	2	0.31%	0.19%
Native American or Alaska Native alone (NH)	5	1	0.51%	0.10%
Asian alone (NH)	3	5	0.31%	0.48%
Native Hawaiian or Pacific Islander alone (NH)	1	1	0.10%	0.10%
Other race alone (NH)	0	1	0.00%	0.10%
Mixed race or Multiracial (NH)	6	15	0.62%	1.43%
Hispanic or Latino (any race)	657	839	67.59%	80.06%
Total	972	1,048	100.00%	100.00%

=== 2020 census ===
As of the 2020 census, Indio Hills had a population of 1,048. The population density was 47.9 inhabitants per square mile (18.5/km^{2}). 0.0% of residents lived in urban areas, while 100.0% lived in rural areas.

The age distribution was 252 people (24.0%) under the age of 18, 117 people (11.2%) aged 18 to 24, 274 people (26.1%) aged 25 to 44, 287 people (27.4%) aged 45 to 64, and 118 people (11.3%) who were 65 years of age or older. The median age was 36.5 years. For every 100 females, there were 114.3 males, and for every 100 females age 18 and over, there were 120.5 males age 18 and over.

The whole population lived in households. There were 304 households, out of which 111 (36.5%) had children under the age of 18 living in them, 176 (57.9%) were married-couple households, 13 (4.3%) were cohabiting couple households, 73 (24.0%) had a male householder with no spouse or partner present, and 42 (13.8%) had a female householder with no spouse or partner present. 57 households (18.8%) were one person, and 24 (7.9%) were one person aged 65 or older. The average household size was 3.45. There were 229 families (75.3% of all households).

There were 334 housing units at an average density of 15.3 units per square mile (5.9 units/km^{2}), of which 304 (91.0%) were occupied. Of these, 233 (76.6%) were owner-occupied, and 71 (23.4%) were occupied by renters. 9.0% were vacant. The homeowner vacancy rate was 0.0% and the rental vacancy rate was 7.5%.

Racial composition as of the 2020 census
Race	Number	Percent
White	279	26.6%
Black or African American	4	0.4%
American Indian and Alaska Native	16	1.5%
Asian	6	0.6%
Native Hawaiian and Other Pacific Islander	2	0.2%
Some other race	512	48.9%
Two or more races	229	21.9%
