= 1859 United States House of Representatives election in California =

California held its election September 7, 1859. From statehood to 1864, California's members were elected at-large, with the top finishers winning election.

District	Incumbent			This race	
District	Member	Party	First elected	Results	Candidates
California at-large 2 seats on a general ticket	Charles L. Scott	Democratic	1856	Incumbent re-elected.	✓ John C. Burch (Democratic) 28.4%; ✓ Charles L. Scott (Democratic) 28.1%; Joseph C. McKibbin (Anti-Lecompton Democratic) 21.4%; Edward D. Baker (Republican) 20.4%; S. A. Booker (Anti-Lecompton Democratic) 1.5%; P. H. Sibley (Republican) 0.1%
California at-large 2 seats on a general ticket	Joseph C. McKibbin	Anti-Lecompton Democratic	1856	Incumbent lost re-election. New member elected. Democratic hold.	✓ John C. Burch (Democratic) 28.4%; ✓ Charles L. Scott (Democratic) 28.1%; Joseph C. McKibbin (Anti-Lecompton Democratic) 21.4%; Edward D. Baker (Republican) 20.4%; S. A. Booker (Anti-Lecompton Democratic) 1.5%; P. H. Sibley (Republican) 0.1%

== See also ==
- 1858 and 1859 United States House of Representatives elections
- List of United States representatives from California
