= California's at-large congressional district =

Former congressional district

- Obsolete district
- Created: 1849; 1883
- Eliminated: 1865; 1885
- Years active: 1849-1865; 1883-1885

After statehood was achieved on September 9, 1850, and until 1865, California elected its congressional representatives statewide at-large — two representatives from September 11, 1850, to 1861, and 3 representatives from 1861 to 1865.

Also, from 1883 to 1885, California elected two of its six representatives to the United States House of Representatives statewide at-large.

== List of members representing the district ==
Congress and years		Seat A			Seat B			Seat C		
Congress and years		Member	Party	Electoral history	Member	Party	Electoral history	Member	Party	Electoral history
31st	September 11, 1850 – March 3, 1851	George W. Wright (San Francisco)	Independent	Elected in 1849. Retired.	Edward Gilbert (San Francisco)	Democratic	Elected in 1849. Retired.			
32nd	March 4, 1851 – March 3, 1853	Edward C. Marshall (Sonora)	Democratic	Elected late in 1851. Retired.	Joseph W. McCorkle (Marysville)	Democratic	Elected late in 1851. Lost renomination.			
33rd	March 3, 1853 – March 3, 1855	Milton Latham (Sacramento)	Democratic	Elected in 1852. Retired.	James A. McDougall (San Francisco)	Democratic	Elected in 1852. Lost re-election.			
34th	March 4, 1855 – March 3, 1857	James W. Denver (Weaverville)	Democratic	Elected in 1854. Retired.	Philemon T. Herbert (Mariposa City)	Democratic	Elected in 1854. Retired after manslaughter acquittal			
35th	March 4, 1857 – March 3, 1859	Joseph C. McKibbin (Downieville)	Democratic	Elected in 1856. Lost re-election.	Charles L. Scott (Sonora)	Democratic	Elected in 1856. Re-elected in 1859. Retired.			
36th	March 4, 1859 – March 3, 1861	John C. Burch (Weaverville)	Democratic	Elected in 1859. Retired.	Charles L. Scott (Sonora)	Democratic	Elected in 1856. Re-elected in 1859. Retired.			
37th	March 4, 1861 – June 3, 1862	Timothy Phelps (San Mateo)	Republican	Elected in 1861. Retired.	Aaron A. Sargent (Nevada City)	Republican	Elected in 1861. Retired.	Vacant		
37th	June 3, 1862 – March 3, 1863	Timothy Phelps (San Mateo)	Republican	Elected in 1861. Retired.	Aaron A. Sargent (Nevada City)	Republican	Elected in 1861. Retired.	Frederick F. Low (San Francisco)	Republican	Elected in 1861 but not permitted by the House to take his seat. Subsequently qualified under special Act of Congress. Retired.
38th	March 4, 1863 – March 3, 1865	Cornelius Cole (Santa Cruz)	Republican	Elected in 1863. Retired to serve in the Civil War.	William Higby (Mokelumne Hill)	Republican	Elected in 1863. Redistricted to the 2nd district.	Thomas B. Shannon (Quincy)	Republican	Elected in 1863. Retired.
39th 40th 41st 42nd 43rd 44th 45th 46th 47th	March 4, 1865 – March 3, 1883	Seat eliminated			Seat eliminated			Seat eliminated		
48th	March 4, 1883 – March 3, 1885	John R. Glascock (Oakland)	Democratic	Elected in 1882. Lost re-election in the 3rd district.	Charles A. Sumner (San Francisco)	Democratic	Elected in 1882. Lost re-election in the 2nd district.	Seat eliminated		

== Election results ==
In these elections, the top two vote-getters (three from 1861 to 1863) were elected to the House.

=== 1849 ===
The election was held November 13, 1849.

1849 United States House of Representatives election in California
Party	Votes	Percentage	Seats	+/–
Independent	20,481	79.44%	1	+1
Democratic	5,300	20.56%	1	+1
Totals	25,781	100.00%	2	—

1849 California's at-large congressional district election
Party	Candidate	Votes	%
Independent	George Washington Wright	5,451	22.0
Democratic	Edward Gilbert	5,300	20.6
Independent	Rodman M. Price	4,040	16.3
Independent	Lewis Dent	2,129	8.3
Independent	P. A. Morse	2,066	8.2
Independent	E. J. C. Kewen	1,826	7.3
Independent	William M. Shepard	1,773	7.2
Independent	William E. Shannon	1,327	5.4
Independent	Peter O. Halstead	1,271	2.4
Independent	L. W. Hastings	215	0.9
Independent	Pierson B. Reading	167	0.7
Independent	W. H. Russell	96	0.4
Independent	J. S. Thompson	72	0.3
Independent	Kimball H. Dimmick	48	0.2
Total votes		25,781	100.0
Turnout			

=== 1851 ===
The 1851 election was held October 7, 1851.

1851 United States House of Representatives election in California
Party	Votes	Percentage	Seats	+/–
Democratic	48,784	53.92%	2	+1
Whig	41,684	46.08%	0	0
Independent	0	0.00%	0	–1
Totals	90,468	100.00%	2	—

1851 California's at-large congressional district election
Party	Candidate	Votes	%
Democratic	Edward C. Marshall	24,469	27.0
Democratic	Joseph McCorkle	24,315	26.9
Whig	E. J. Kewen	21,460	23.7
Whig	B. J. Moore	20,224	22.4
Total votes		90,468	100.0
Turnout			

=== 1852 ===
The election was held November 2, 1852.

1852 United States House of Representatives election in California
Party	Votes	Percentage	Seats	+/–
Democratic	79,268	53.38%	2	0
Whig	69,232	46.62%	0	0
Totals	148,500	100.00%	2	—

1852 California's at-large congressional district election
Party	Candidate	Votes	%
Democratic	Milton S. Latham	39,881	26.9
Democratic	James A. McDougall	39,387	26.5
Whig	P. L. Edwards	34,933	23.5
Whig	G. B. Tingley	34,299	23.1
Total votes		148,500	100.0
Turnout			

=== 1854 ===
The election was held September 6, 1854.

1854 United States House of Representatives election in California
Party	Votes	Percentage	Seats
Democratic	95,178	58.0%	2
Whig	69,152	42.0%	0
Totals	164,330	100.0%	2

1854 California's at-large congressional district election
Party	Candidate	Votes	%
Democratic	James W. Denver	36,819	22.4
Democratic	Philemon T. Herbert	36,542	22.4
Whig	G. W. Bowie	34,741	21.1
Whig	Cal Bonham	34,411	20.9
Democratic	J. Churchman	10,006	6.1
Democratic	James A. McDougall (Incumbent)	9,968	6.1
Democratic	Milton S. Latham (Incumbent)	1,843	1.1
Total votes		164,330	100.0
Turnout			

=== 1856 ===
The election was held November 4, 1856.

1856 United States House of Representatives election in California
Party	Votes	Percentage	Seats
Democratic	101,708	47.0%	2
Know Nothing	71,403	33.0%	0
Republican	43,139	20.0%	0
Totals	216,250	100.0%	2

1856 California's at-large congressional district election
Party	Candidate	Votes	%
Democratic	Joseph C. McKibbin	50,895	23.5
Democratic	Charles L. Scott	50,813	23.5
Know Nothing	B. C. Whitman	36,078	16.7
Know Nothing	A. B. Dibble	35,325	16.3
Republican	L. P. Rankin	21,975	10.2
Republican	J. D. Turner	21,164	9.8
Total votes		216,250	100.0
Turnout			

=== 1859 ===
The election was held September 7, 1859.

United States House of Representatives election in California,
Party	Votes	Percentage	Seats
Democratic	161,106	79.4%	2
Republican	41,739	20.6%	0
Totals	202,845	100.0%	2

1859 California's at-large congressional district election
Party	Candidate	Votes	%
Democratic	John C. Burch	57,665	28.4
Democratic	Charles L. Scott	56,998	28.1
Democratic	Joseph C. McKibbin (Incumbent)	43,474	21.4
Republican	Edward D. Baker	41,438	20.4
Democratic	S. A. Booker	2,969	1.5
Republican	P. H. Sibley	301	0.1
Total votes		202,845	100.0
Turnout			

=== 1861 ===
The election was held September 4, 1861.

1861 United States House of Representatives election in California
Party	Votes	Percentage	Seats	+/–
Democratic	180,719	56.1%	0	-2
Republican	141,402	43.9%	3	+3
Totals	322,121	100.0%	3	—

1861 California's at-large congressional district election
Party	Candidate	Votes	%
Republican	Timothy Guy Phelps	51,651	21.8
Republican	W. L. Dudley	50,692	21.4
Democratic	H. Edgerton	35,449	15.0
Democratic	Joseph C. McKibbin	35,401	15.0
Democratic	D. O. Shattuck	31,712	13.4
Democratic	H. P. Barbers	31,591	13.4
Total votes		236,496	100.0
Turnout			

California's at-large congressional election for seat added by reapportionment, 1861
Party	Candidate	Votes	%
Republican	Frederick F. Low	39,059	45.6
Democratic	F. Gunhal	24,036	28.1
Democratic	J. R. Gitchell	22,530	26.3
Total votes		85,625	100.0
Turnout			

=== 1863 ===
The election was held September 2, 1863.

1863 United States House of Representatives election in California
Party	Votes	Percentage	Seats
Republican	194,882	69.1%	0
Democratic	87,087	30.9%	0
Totals	281,969	100.0%	3

1863 California's at-large congressional district election
Party	Candidate	Votes	%
Republican	Cornelius Cole	65,085	23.1
Republican	Thomas B. Shannon	64,914	23.0
Republican	William Higby	64,883	23.0
Democratic	John B. Weller	43,567	15.5
Democratic	John Bigler	43,520	15.4
Total votes		281,969	100.0
Turnout			

=== 1882 ===
California elected two at-large representatives in addition to its four representatives in districts in 1882. For these results see 1882 United States House of Representatives elections in California.

== See also ==
- Political party strength in California
- Political party strength in U.S. states

== Sources ==
- Dubin, Michael J. (1998). United States Congressional elections, 1788-1997 : the official results of the elections of the 1st through 105th Congresses. Jefferson, N.C.: McFarland, 1998.
