= 1882 United States House of Representatives elections in California =

United States House of Representatives elections in California, 1882
- November 7, 1882

All 6 California seats to the United States House of Representatives
	Majority party	Minority party
Party	Democratic	Republican
Last election	2	2
Seats won	6	0
Seat change	▲4	▼2
Popular vote	262,366	219,054
Percentage	53.3%	44.5%
- Election results by district.

The United States House of Representatives elections in California, 1882 was an election for California's delegation to the United States House of Representatives, which occurred as part of the general election of the House of Representatives on November 7, 1882. California gained two seats as a result of the 1880 census, which were at-large districts for this election, becoming the new 3rd and 6th districts in 1884. Democrats won both at-large seats. Of California's existing districts, Democrats won both Republican-held districts.

== Overview ==
United States House of Representatives elections in California, 1882
Party	Votes	Percentage	Seats	+/–
Democratic	262,366	53.3%	6	+4
Republican	219,054	44.5%	0	-2
Prohibition	8,423	1.7%	0	0
Greenback	3,130	0.6%	0	0
Totals	492,618	100.0%	6	+2

== Delegation composition ==
Pre-election	Seats
Democratic-Held	2
Republican-Held	2

Post-election	Seats
Democratic-Held	6

== Results ==
=== District 1 ===
California's 1st congressional district election, 1882
Party	Candidate	Votes	%
Democratic	William Rosecrans (incumbent)	22,733	59.5
Republican	Paul Neumann	14,847	38.8
Prohibition	James M. Shafter	580	1.5
Greenback	H. S. Fitch	67	0.2
Total votes		38,227	100.0
Turnout			
Democratic hold			

=== District 2 ===
California's 2nd congressional district election, 1882
Party	Candidate	Votes	%
Democratic	James Budd	20,229	50.5
Republican	Horace F. Page (incumbent)	19,246	48.1
Prohibition	J. L. Coles	478	1.2
Greenback	F. Woodward	78	0.2
Total votes		40,031	100.0
Turnout			
Democratic gain from Republican			

=== District 3 ===
California's 3rd congressional district election, 1882
Party	Candidate	Votes	%
Democratic	Barclay Henley	21,807	51.3
Republican	John J. De Haven	19,473	45.8
Prohibition	H. S. Graves	862	2.0
Greenback	W. Howe	401	0.9
Total votes		42,543	100.0
Turnout			
Democratic hold			

=== District 4 ===
California's 4th congressional district election, 1882
Party	Candidate	Votes	%
Democratic	Pleasant B. Tully	23,105	54.4
Republican	George Lemuel Woods	18,387	43.3
Prohibition	M. V. Wright	650	1.5
Greenback	Isaac Kinley	355	0.8
Total votes		42,497	100.0
Turnout			
Democratic gain from Republican			

=== Districts at-large ===
California's At-Large congressional districts election, 1882
Party	Candidate	Votes	%
Democratic	John R. Glascock	87,259	26.5
Democratic	Charles A. Sumner	87,233	26.5
Republican	W. W. Morrow	73,647	22.4
Republican	Henry Edgerton	73,454	22.3
Prohibition	A. B. Hotchkiss	2,776	0.8
Prohibition	J. Yarnell	2,722	0.8
Greenback	Warren Chase	1,139	0.3
Greenback	S. Maybell	1,090	0.3
Total votes		329,320	100.0
Turnout			

== See also ==
- 48th United States Congress
- Political party strength in California
- Political party strength in U.S. states
- United States House of Representatives elections, 1882

== Sources ==
- Dubin, Michael J. (1998). United States Congressional elections, 1788-1997 : the official results of the elections of the 1st through 105th Congresses. Jefferson, N.C.: McFarland, 1998.
