= Senator Kitchell =

Senator Kitchell may refer to:

- Aaron Kitchell (1744–1820), New Jersey State Senate
- Wickliffe Kitchell (1789–1869), Illinois State Senate

== See also ==
- Jane Kitchel (born 1945), Vermont State Senate
