= Joseph McKenna =

US Supreme Court justice from 1898 to 1925

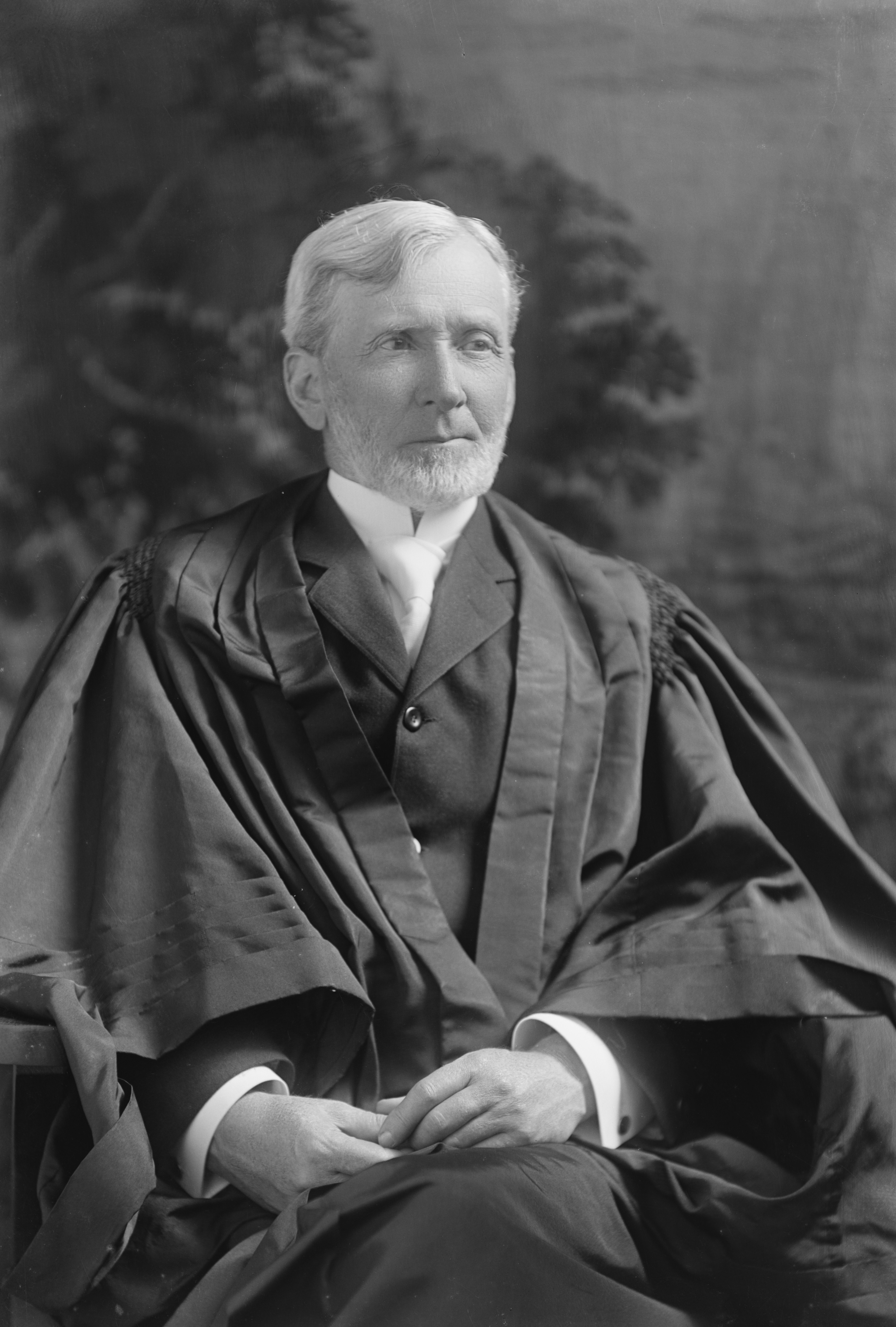
- Portrait by C. M. Bell c. 1905–1909

Associate Justice of the Supreme Court of the United States
- In office January 26, 1898 – January 5, 1925
- Nominated by: William McKinley
- Preceded by: Stephen Field
- Succeeded by: Harlan Stone

42nd United States Attorney General
- In office March 5, 1897 – January 25, 1898
- President: William McKinley
- Preceded by: Judson Harmon
- Succeeded by: John Griggs

Judge of the United States Court of Appeals for the Ninth Circuit
- In office March 17, 1892 – March 5, 1897
- Nominated by: Benjamin Harrison
- Preceded by: Lorenzo Sawyer
- Succeeded by: William Morrow

Member of the U.S. House of Representatives from California's 3rd district
- In office March 4, 1885 – March 28, 1892
- Preceded by: Barclay Henley
- Succeeded by: Samuel Hilborn

Member of the California State Assembly from the 19th district
- In office December 6, 1875 – December 3, 1877
- Preceded by: Multi-member district
- Succeeded by: Multi-member district

District Attorney of Solano County
- In office 1866–1868

Personal details
- Born: August 10, 1843 Philadelphia, Pennsylvania, U.S.
- Died: November 21, 1926 (aged 83) Washington, D.C., U.S.
- Party: Republican
- Spouse: Amanda Borneman (m. 1869; died 1924)
- Children: 4
- Education: Saint Joseph's University
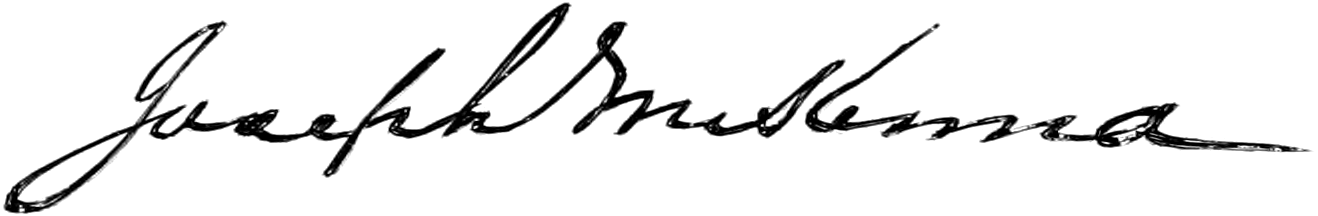
- Signature

Joseph McKenna (August 10, 1843 – November 21, 1926) was an American politician who served in all three branches of the U.S. federal government as a member of the U.S. House of Representatives, as U.S. Attorney General and as an Associate Justice of the Supreme Court. He is one of seventeen members of the House of Representatives who subsequently served on the Supreme Court (including two Chief Justices).

== Early life and career ==
Born in Philadelphia, Pennsylvania, the son of Irish Catholic immigrants, he attended St. Joseph's College and the Collegiate Institute in Benicia, California. After being admitted to the California bar in 1865, he entered private practice for one year and then became District Attorney for Solano County and then campaigned for and won a seat in the California State Assembly for two years (1875–1877). He retired after one term and an unsuccessful bid for Speaker.

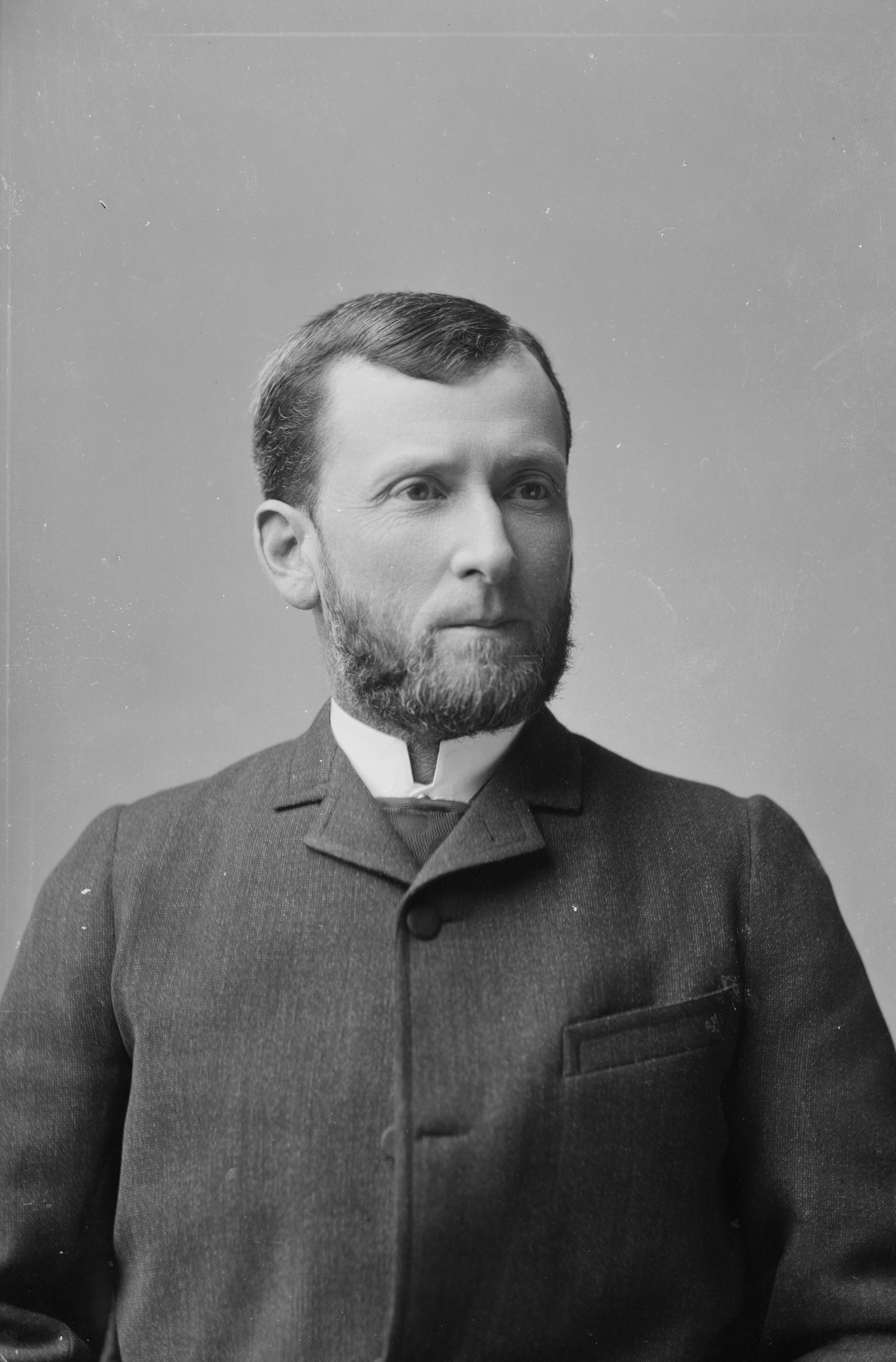
Portrait by C. M. Bell c. 1885–1890

After two unsuccessful attempts, McKenna was elected to the United States House of Representatives in 1884 and served for four terms. While in Congress, he was a "vehement proponent" of Chinese exclusion.

He was appointed to the Ninth Circuit Court of Appeals in 1892 by President Benjamin Harrison.

In 1897 he was appointed the 42nd Attorney General of the United States by President William McKinley, and served in that capacity until 1898.

== Judicial career ==
McKenna was nominated by President McKinley on December 16, 1897, as an associate justice of the Supreme Court of the United States, to succeed Stephen Johnson Field. He was confirmed by the Senate on January 21, 1898, by a voice vote. He then took the judicial oath of office on January 26, 1898. Conscious of his limited credentials, McKenna attended Columbia Law School for about a month between his nomination and Senate confirmation to improve his legal education before taking his seat on the Court.

Although he never developed a consistent legal philosophy, McKenna was the author of a number of important decisions. One of the most notable was his opinion in the case of United States v. U.S. Steel Corporation (1920) which held that antitrust cases would be decided on the "rule of reason" principle—only alleged monopolistic combinations that are in unreasonable restraint of trade are illegal.

He authored 614 majority opinions, and 146 dissenting opinions during his time on the bench. His passionate rebuttal to the denial of "pecuniary benefit" to a wife whose husband had been killed while working on the railroad was among those which brought a change to the Employer Liability Act. One of his most noteworthy opinions was Hipolite Egg Co. v. United States, 220 U.S. 45 (1911), in which a unanimous Court upheld the Pure Food and Drug Act of 1906.

In Hoke v. United States (1913), he concurred in upholding the Mann Act. However, four years later, he dissented from the Court's opinion in Caminetti v. United States (1917), which held the act applied to private, noncommercial enticements to cross state lines for purposes of a sexual liaison. According to McKenna, the Act regulated only commercial vice, i.e., "immoralities having a mercenary purpose."

McKenna wrote Williams v. Mississippi, upholding the state's racist 1890 Constitution that disenfranchised nearly every African American in the state through poll taxes and literacy tests, while exempting whites through a grandfather clause.

While McKenna was generally quite favorable to federal power, he joined the Court's substantive due process jurisprudence and voted with the majority in 1905's Lochner v. New York, which struck down a state maximum-hours law for bakery workers. This decision carried broader implications for the scope of federal power, at least until the New Deal and the 1937 switch-in-time-that-saved-nine West Coast Hotel Co. v. Parrish. (See Judiciary Reorganization Bill of 1937.)

McKenna resigned from the Court in January 1925 at the suggestion of Chief Justice William Howard Taft. McKenna's ability to perform his duties had been diminished significantly by a stroke suffered 10 years earlier, and by the end of his tenure McKenna could not be counted on to write coherent opinions.

McKenna was one of 15 Catholic justices (out of the 116 total through the appointment of Justice Ketanji Brown Jackson) in the history of the Supreme Court.

== Personal life and death ==
McKenna married Amanda Borneman in 1869, and the couple had three daughters and one son. His wife died in 1924. McKenna died on November 21, 1926. in Washington, D.C. His remains are interred at the city's Mount Olivet Cemetery.

== Electoral history ==
1884 United States House of Representatives elections in California, District 3
Party	Candidate	Votes	%
Republican	Joseph McKenna	17,435	55.8
Democratic	John R. Glascock (Incumbent)	13,197	42.3
Prohibition	Joshua B. Wills	322	1.0
Populist	A. B. Burns	273	0.9
Total votes		31,227	100.0
Republican win (new seat)			

1886 United States House of Representatives elections in California, District 3
Party	Candidate	Votes	%
Republican	Joseph McKenna (Incumbent)	15,801	53.0
Democratic	Henry C. McPike	13,277	44.5
Prohibition	W. W. Smith	707	2.4
Independent	W. J. Cuthbertson	32	0.1
Total votes		29,817	100.0
Republican hold			

1888 United States House of Representatives elections in California, District 3
Party	Candidate	Votes	%
Republican	Joseph McKenna (Incumbent)	19,912	56.0
Democratic	Ben Morgan	14,633	41.2
Prohibition	W. W. Smith	657	1.9
Know Nothing	S. Solon Hall	338	1.0
Total votes		35,540	100.0
Republican hold			

1890 United States House of Representatives elections in California, District 3
Party	Candidate	Votes	%
Republican	Joseph McKenna (Incumbent)	20,834	55.4
Democratic	John P. Irish	15,997	42.5
Prohibition	O. O. Felkner	774	2.1
Total votes		37,605	100.0
Republican hold			

== See also ==
- List of justices of the Supreme Court of the United States
- List of United States Supreme Court cases by the Fuller Court
- List of United States Supreme Court cases by the Taft Court
- List of United States Supreme Court cases by the White Court

California Assembly
Preceded by James Dixon; William H. Northcutt; W. S. M. Wright	Member of the California Assembly from the 19th district 1875–1877; Served alongside: Thomas M. Swan	Succeeded by John T. Dare; Richard C. Haile
U.S. House of Representatives
Preceded by Barclay Henley	Member of the U.S. House of Representatives from California's 3rd congressional district 1885–1891	Succeeded by Samuel Hilborn
Legal offices
Preceded by Lorenzo Sawyer	Judge of the United States Court of Appeals for the Ninth Circuit; 1892–1897	Succeeded by William Morrow
Preceded by Judson Harmon	United States Attorney General; 1897–1898	Succeeded by John Griggs
Preceded by Stephen Field	Associate Justice of the Supreme Court of the United States; 1898–1925	Succeeded by Harlan Stone
