= William Tell Coleman =

American pioneer and politician (1824–1893)

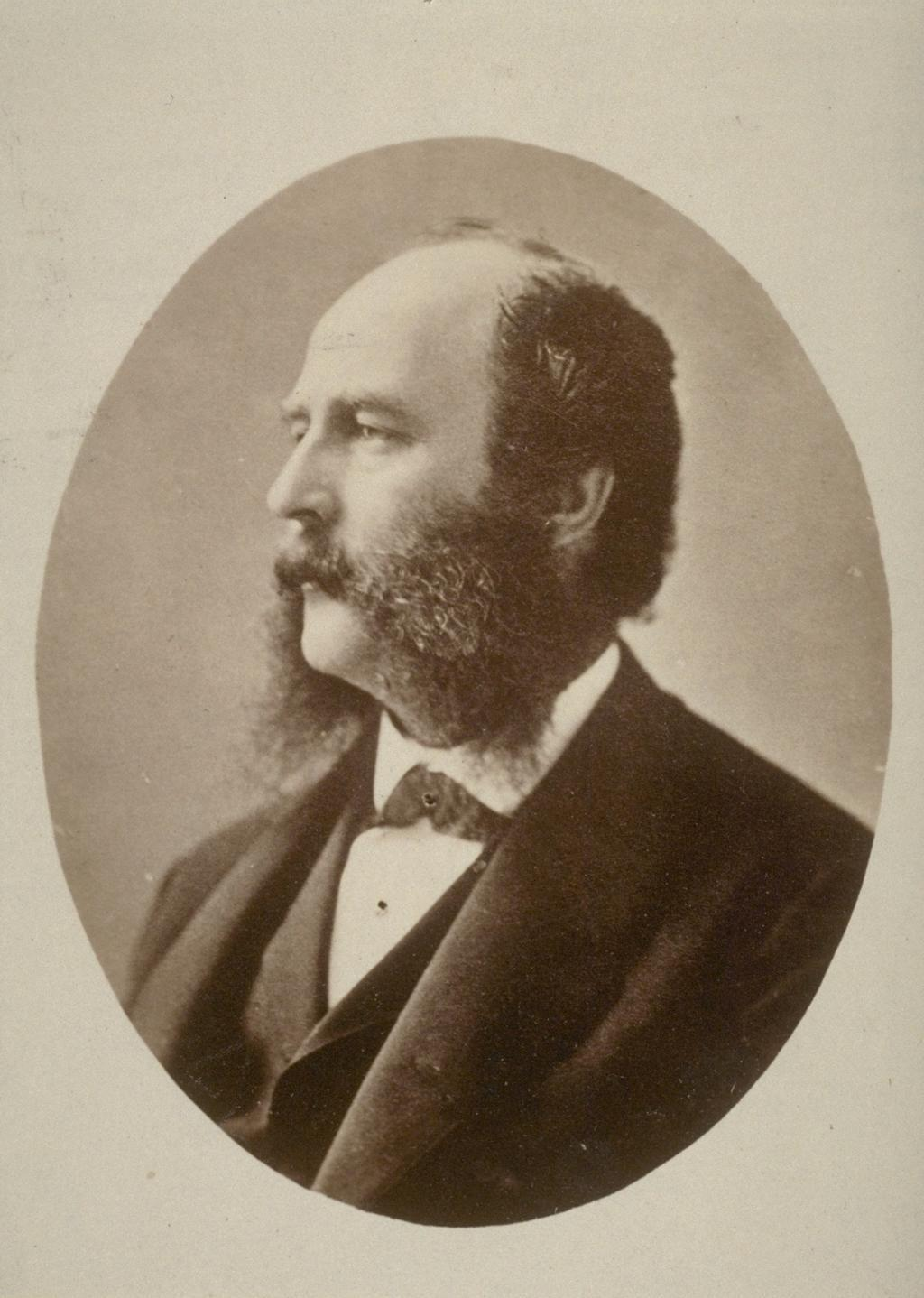
William Tell Coleman

William Tell Coleman (February 29, 1824 – November 22, 1893) was an American pioneer and politician who served as the Chairman of the San Francisco Committee of Vigilance. He later served two separate terms in the California State Assembly in 1859 and 1861. He was the Democratic candidate for U.S. Senate in 1865, but lost to Republican Cornelius Cole.

== Early life ==
William Tell Coleman was born in Cynthiana in Harrison County, Kentucky on February 29, 1824. He was educated at St. Louis University in Missouri.

== Committees of Vigilance ==
Coleman earlier in life

In 1849, Coleman arrived in California and eventually settled in San Francisco, where he engaged in the shipping and commission business. He first emerged as a leading figure in the 1851 Committees of Vigilance in the aftermath of a speech imploring the mob to conduct a formal, albeit illegal, court rather than lynch its targets immediately. Owing to the respect earned from this role, Coleman would be chosen to lead the larger 1856 Committee of Vigilance, which usurped civic power in order to drive out the Democratic Party machine and ostensibly to establish law and order in the aftermath of the assassination of controversial newspaper editor James King of William. Under Coleman, these committees ignored habeas corpus, conducted secret trials, lynchings, and deportations, and raised a militia. The committee would confront city leaders and even Governor J. Neely Johnson with threats of usurping state government and pursuing an independent course bordering on secession, however, Coleman would successfully override Committee radicals.

Thus, the 1856 Committee of Vigilance disbanded, but not before transferring power to the new People's Party, which soon merged with the Republican Party and controlled San Francisco until 1867.

== Shipping ==
Wm. T. Coleman & Co (House flag)

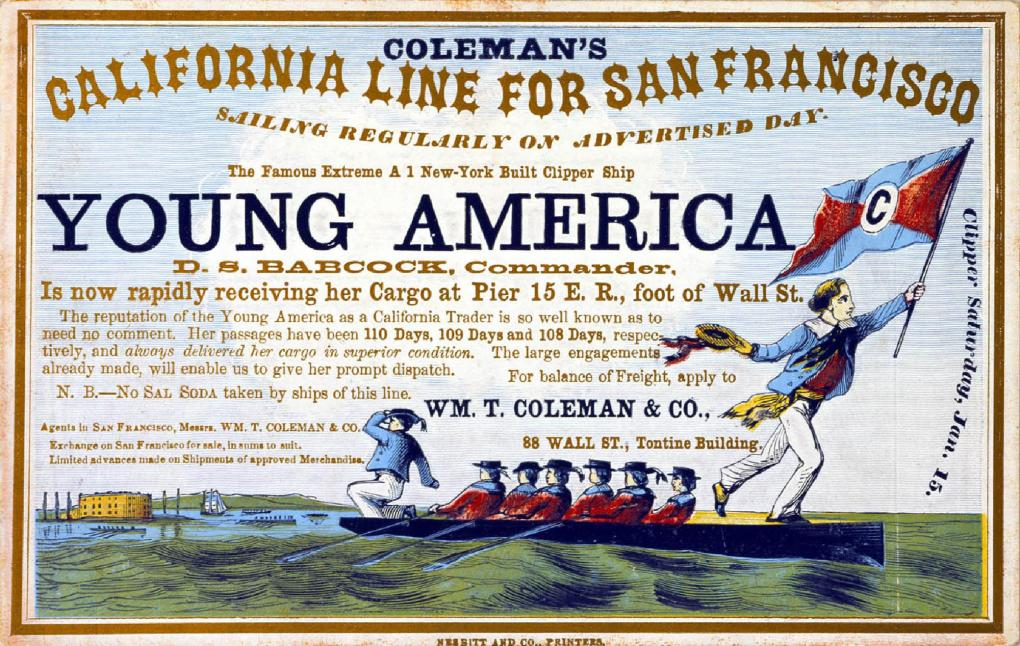
A Young America clipper sailing card, issued by its agent Wm. T. Coleman & Co.

After opening a branch in New York City, Coleman established a steamship line between that city and San Francisco in 1856. In 1857 he moved to New York and conducted his business from that city until 1864.

One of Coleman's most noteworthy achievements was the embellishment and extension of the town of San Rafael, California.

== Committee of Safety ==
After a protest in sympathy with the Great Railroad Strike of 1877 turned into an anti-Asian riot, Coleman again mobilized troops to quell the unrest. This time, however, he and his colleagues determined that extra-legal vigilante action was not called for. Coleman formed the Committee of Safety as a supplementary force to the city police (which was doubled in strength during the unrest). Fearing that the Committee of Safety troops would only exacerbate violence and disorder, they were not given firearms. Instead, they were armed with pick handles and became known as the "Pick Handle Brigade." Coleman's concern was less for the well-being of the local Chinese community than fear that a working class party would take power in San Francisco. Nevertheless, the Workingman's Party was formed under the leadership of Denis Kearney. Its slogan was "The Chinese Must Go!" and the party helped foster the racism and political momentum that culminated with the Chinese Exclusion Act of 1882.

Regaining notoriety for his role in the Committee of Safety, Coleman was briefly floated as a candidate in the 1880 Democratic National Convention.

== Borax mining ==
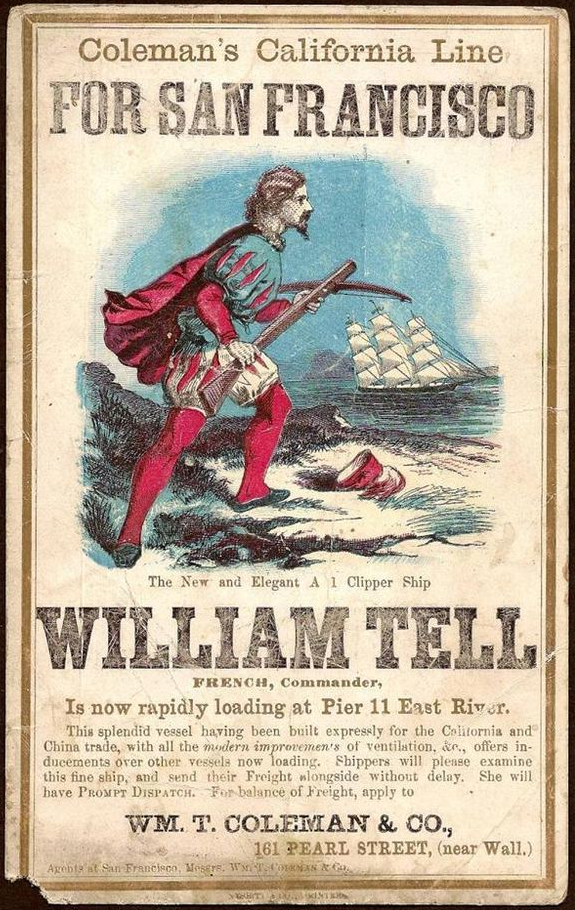
Clipper card for the William Tell

During the 1880s, Coleman was the owner of the Harmony Borax Works in Death Valley, operating famous twenty mule teams to carry the product from 1883 to 1889. The borax works in Death Valley were subsequently acquired by Francis Marion Smith to form the Pacific Coast Borax Company. The town named Lila C, California was at the Lila C mine, named by its owner William Tell Coleman, for his daughter, Lila C. Coleman. Following a decrease in tariffs upon the importation of borax, Coleman would lose over $2,000,000, filing for bankruptcy on May 7, 1888.

== Death ==
William Tell Coleman died at his home in San Francisco on November 22, 1893.

== Legacy ==
The mineral Colemanite was named in his honor.

The actor Gregg Palmer was cast as Coleman in 1958 episode, "Empire of Youth", on the syndicated television anthology series, Death Valley Days, narrated by Stanley Andrews. In the story line, Coleman shuns gambling and prospecting for gold but devotes his talents elsewhere and makes several fortunes in farming and the mining of borax.

== See also ==
- Twenty-Mule-Team Borax
- Francis Marion Smith
