= 1865 United States Senate election in California =

- December 16, 1865

Majority vote of both houses needed to win
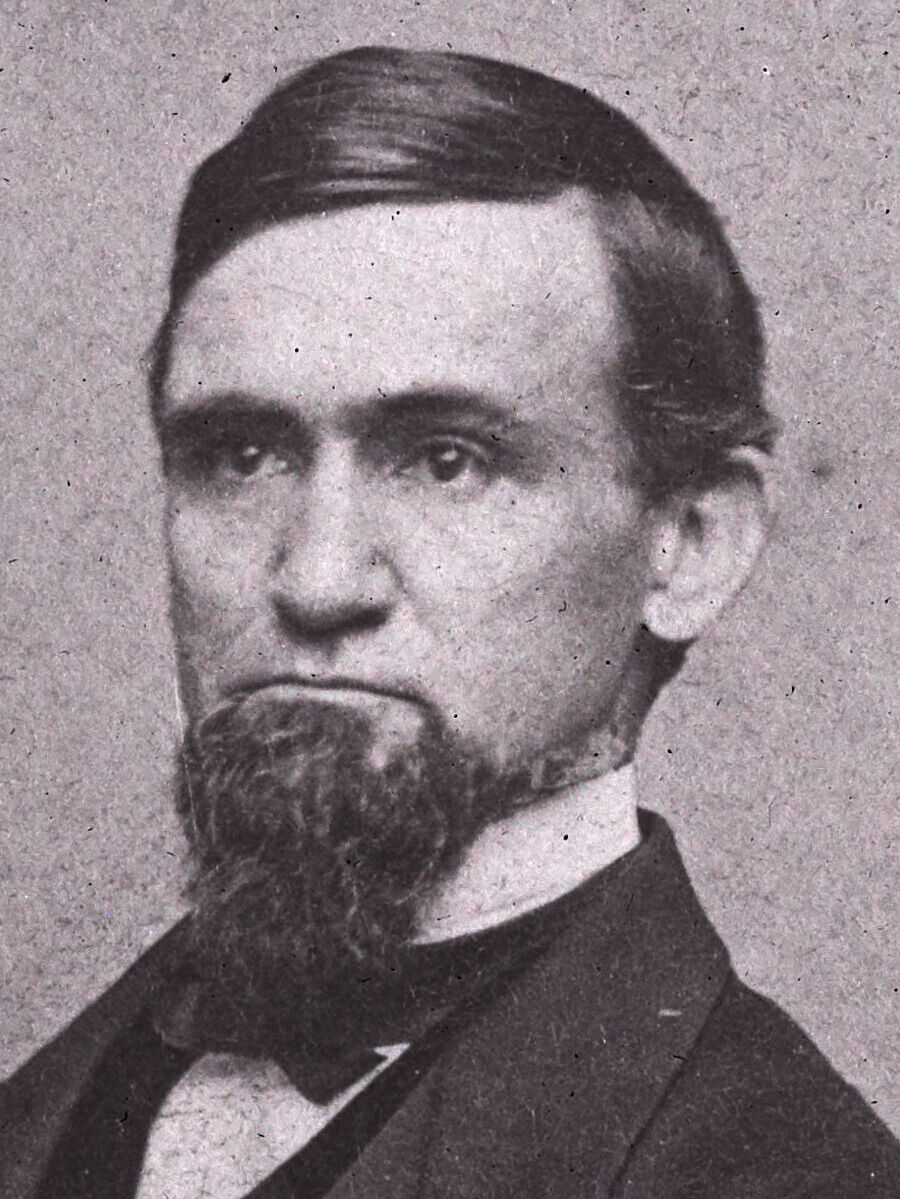

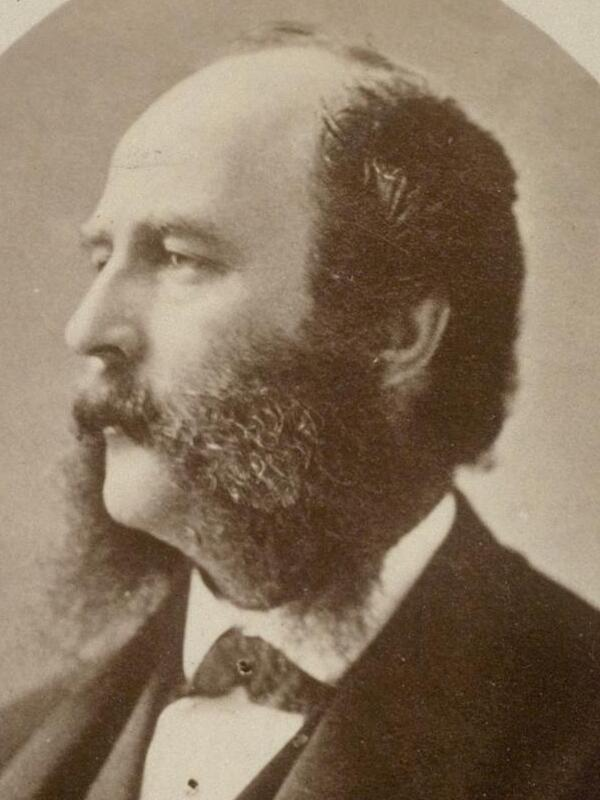
| Nominee | Cornelius Cole | William T. Coleman |
| Party | National Union | Democratic |
| Joint session | 92 | 26 |
| Percentage | 77.31% | 21.85% |
Senator before election
James A. McDougall
Democratic
Elected Senator
Cornelius Cole
National Union

The 1865 United States Senate election in California was held on December 16, 1865, by the California State Legislature to elect a U.S. senator (Class 3) to represent the State of California in the United States Senate. In a special joint session, former Republican Congressman Cornelius Cole was elected over former Democratic State Assemblyman William Tell Coleman. Cole was the candidate of the Union Party.

== Results ==
Election in the Legislature (joint session)
| Party | Candidate | Votes | % |
|---|---|---|---|
| National Union | Cornelius Cole | 92 | 77.31% |
| Democratic | William T. Coleman | 26 | 21.85% |
| Democratic | Eugene Casserly | 1 | 0.84% |
| Total votes | | 119 | 100.00% |
