= Timothy Guy Phelps =

American politician (1824–1899)

Timothy G. Phelps
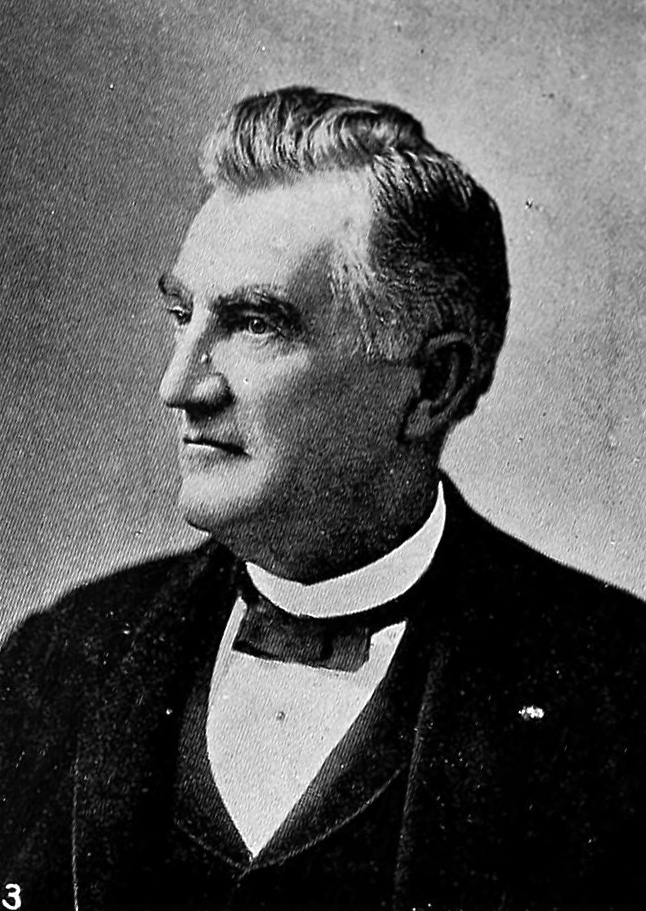
- Phelps c. 1892

Collector of the Port of San Francisco
- In office April 17, 1889 – April 19, 1893
- Appointed by: Benjamin Harrison
- Preceded by: John S. Hager
- Succeeded by: John H. Wise
- In office January 24, 1870 – May 8, 1872
- Appointed by: Ulysses S. Grant
- Preceded by: John Franklin Miller
- Succeeded by: Thomas Bowles Shannon

Member of the U.S. House of Representatives from California's at-large district
- In office March 4, 1861 – March 3, 1863
- Preceded by: John Chilton Burch
- Succeeded by: Cornelius Cole

Member of the California Senate from the 5th district
- In office January 2, 1860 – January 7, 1861
- Preceded by: Multi-member district
- Succeeded by: Multi-member district
- In office January 4, 1858 – January 3, 1859
- Preceded by: Multi-member district
- Succeeded by: Multi-member district

Member of the California State Assembly
- In office January 7, 1895 – January 4, 1897
- Preceded by: James Thomas O'Keefe
- Succeeded by: S. G. Goodhue
- Constituency: 52nd district
- In office January 5, 1857 – January 4, 1858
- Preceded by: Multi-member district
- Succeeded by: Multi-member district
- Constituency: 5th district

Personal details
- Born: Timothy Guy Phelps; December 20, 1824 Oxford, New York, U.S.
- Died: June 11, 1899 (aged 74) Near San Carlos, California, U.S.
- Resting place: Cypress Lawn Memorial Park
- Party: Republican
- Spouse(s): Sophronia J. Jewell (m. 1853; died 1869) Josephine A. McLean (m. 1870)

Timothy Guy Phelps (December 20, 1824 – June 11, 1899) was an American politician, businessman, and government official. He was the first president of the Southern Pacific Railroad from 1865 until 1868 and saw the railroad build its first tracks south of San Francisco, California.

== Biography ==
=== Early years ===
Phelps was born in Oxford, New York on December 20, 1824, and completed preparatory schooling there before moving to New York City in 1845. He worked in mercantile there for a short time, then returned to Chenango County to study law.

=== Mining ===
As soon as word reached New York that gold was found in California in 1848, Phelps took a boat to the west coast. He arrived in San Francisco, California via Panama on December 14, 1849 and moved to Tuolumne County, California, where he tried his hand at mining. Failing to find a fortune in gold, he moved to San Francisco to resume a career in the mercantile, starting a merchant house in August 1850.

=== Career ===
Phelps took substantial business losses in the great fire of 1851, but he rebuilt and soon recovered. It was during this period of recovery that he purchased 3,500 acres (1,400 ha) of land in what is now San Mateo County, California. He used the land for farming and soon decided to make the area, now the city of San Carlos, his home.

In 1851, while living in San Carlos, Phelps became involved in the local vigilance committee in an effort to uphold the law.

=== State Legislature ===
Engraving of Phelps published 1858

Following a failed state assembly bid in 1854 (where he ran with Col. E. D. Baker) Phelps was elected to the California State Assembly in 1855 and served until 1857 as the first Republican from San Francisco and San Mateo Counties. During his term, he served on the first Grand Jury on August 1, 1856. He introduced "An Act to reorganize and establish the County of San Mateo" in March 1857.

He then served in the California State Senate from 1858 to 1861. During the 1859 Republican California state convention, his name was advanced as a potential nominee for Governor of California, but he withdrew in favor of Leland Stanford.

In the subsequent 1861 Republican state convention, he ran for the Republican nomination for governor, but was defeated by Stanford, 197 votes to 104.

=== Congress ===
Following the 1861 convention, he was elected to the 37th United States Congress where he served from March 4, 1861, until March 3, 1863. When the San Francisco and San Jose Railroad was built in the 1860s, the right of way from Redwood City to Belmont was granted from Phelps's land.

=== Later career ===
Engraving by J. A. J. Wilcox, 1882

Phelps next worked in real estate, and on January 24, 1870 he was appointed customs collector for the Port of San Francisco by President Ulysses S. Grant, serving until May 8, 1872. In 1875, he won the Republican nomination for governor, but he was defeated by the Democratic candidate William Irwin, in part aided by disgruntled Republicans who ran John Bidwell as an independent candidate. In 1888, Phelps ran for Congress again, but was defeated by the Democrat Thomas J. Clunie. Shannon was again appointed collector of San Francisco by President Benjamin Harrison on April 17, 1889, serving until April 19, 1893. He was elected to the State Assembly again in 1894, serving one term.

Phelps also served as a regent of the University of California at Berkeley from 1878 until his death.

=== Personal life ===
Phelps married Sophronia J. Jewell (born Nov 13, 1824), of Guilford, New York, on September 13, 1853. Sophronia died on September 12, 1869 (aged 44) and Phelps was remarried to Josephine A. McLean in 1870.

=== Death ===
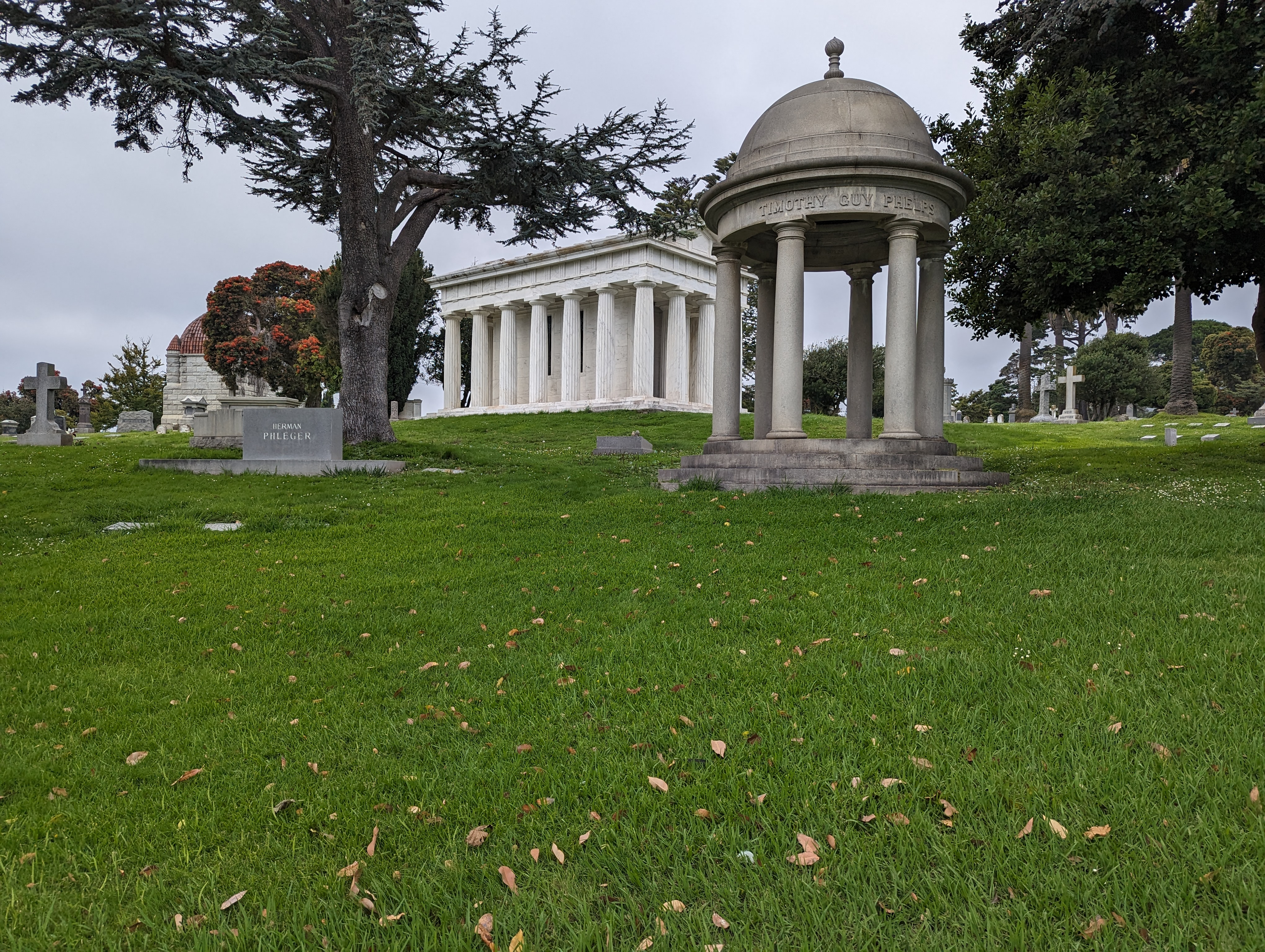
Phelps's grave at Cypress Lawn Memorial Park

Phelps died at age 74 on June 11, 1899, near San Carlos, after he was struck by two boys on a tandem bicycle. The cyclists turned themselves in after learning of his death, and charges against them were dropped on June 20, 1899, after they related their account of the crash.

Phelps was buried at Cypress Lawn Memorial Park in Colma.

Party political offices
Preceded by Newton Booth	Republican nominee for Governor of California; 1875	Succeeded by George Clement Perkins
U.S. House of Representatives
Preceded by John C. Burch	Member of the U.S. House of Representatives from California's at-large congressional district 1861–1863	Succeeded by Cornelius Cole
