= Rombach Place =

Historic house in Ohio, United States

- U.S. National Register of Historic Places
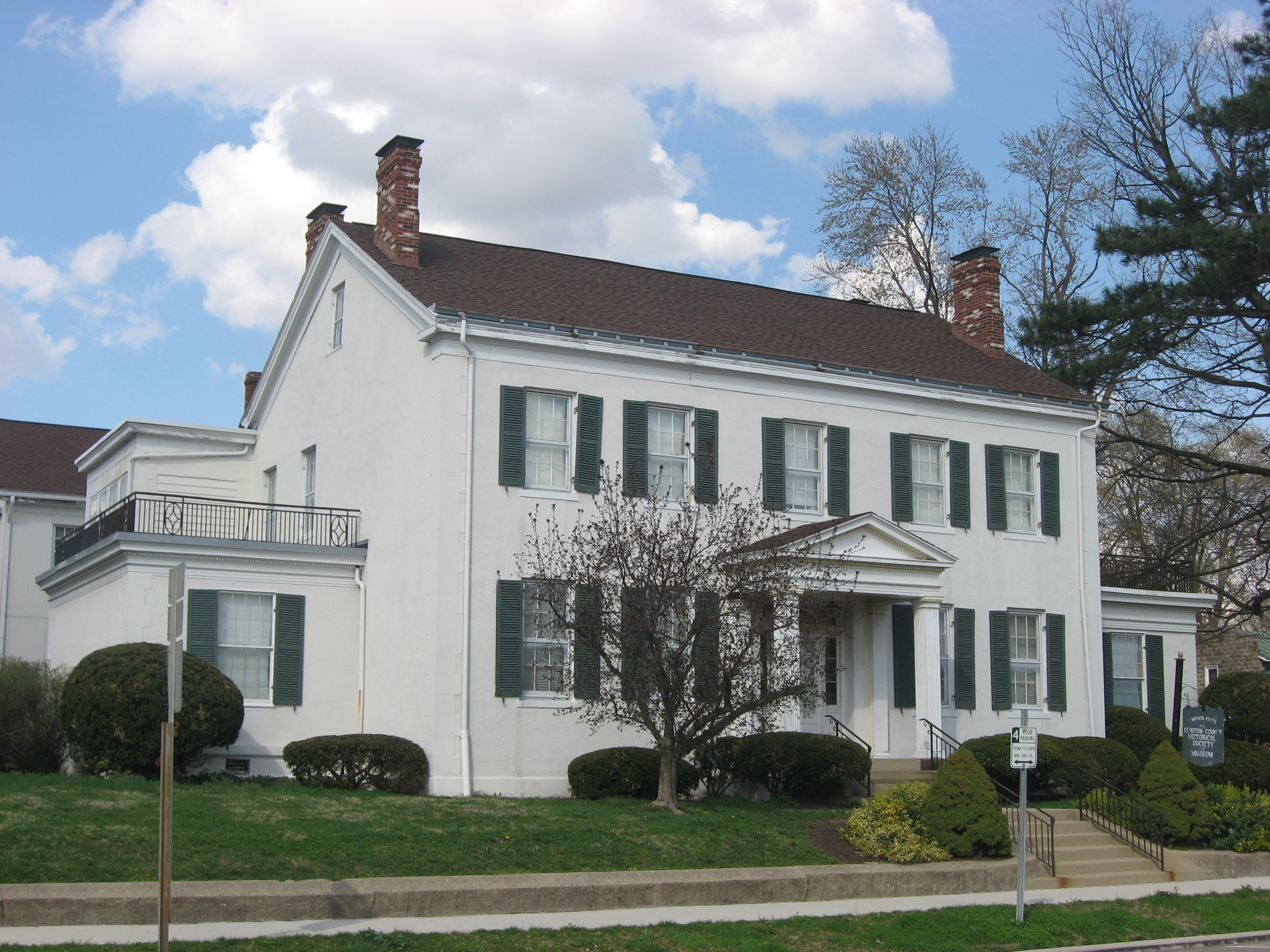
- Front and western end

- Location within Ohio Location within the United States
- Location: 149 E. Locust Street, Wilmington, Ohio
- Coordinates: 39°26′48″N 83°49′33″W
- Area: 1 acre (0.40 ha)
- Built: 1831
- Architect: Robert Wickersham
- NRHP reference No.: 79001793
- Added to NRHP: June 20, 1979

The Rombach Place is a historic house in the city of Wilmington, Ohio, United States. Built in the first third of the nineteenth century, it was home to a family that produced two prominent national politicians. No longer used as a residence, the house is now a museum, and it has been named a historic site.

== History ==
Robert Wickersham built the Rombach Place in 1831. It was later home to the family of James W. Denver, a politician who achieved national prominence in the middle of the century.

James Denver was born in Winchester, Virginia in 1817, and at the age of thirty-nine he married the former Louise Rombach of Wilmington; to this union were born four children. Much of his youth was spent on a farm near Wilmington, but he later moved far to the west, serving as a U.S. Representative from California, a governor of the Kansas Territory (a new settlement in the far west of the territory, now part of Colorado, was named for him), as the Commissioner of Indian Affairs, and as a U.S. Army general during the Civil War. However, after the war, he returned to Wilmington for a time. In 1870, while he and his family were resident in the Rombach Place, their youngest son was born; named Matthew, he was later elected a U.S. Representative from Ohio.

== Architecture ==
Built in the Greek Revival style of architecture, the primary portion of the house is two stories tall and five bays wide. An entrance is located in the middle bay of the first floor, covered by a small portico with a pediment and four square columns. Smaller windows and prominent chimneys are located on the ends of the house, to which are attached one-bay, single-story sections. Built in the shape of the letter "T", the house is constructed of brick and covered with a shingled roof that rises to a pair of gables; the walls are covered with stucco, and a fence encircles the roofs of the single-story sections on the ends.

== Preservation ==
Today, the Rombach Place is no longer used as a residence: it is the home of the Clinton County Historical Society, which operates it as a museum, genealogy library, and conference center. The house was listed on the National Register of Historic Places in 1979, qualifying both because of its historically significant architecture and because of its place as the home of General James Denver. It was the city's third building to be listed on the National Register; the Doan House on the city's east side was listed on the same day, and College Hall on the Wilmington College campus preceded both buildings by six years.
