= James W. Denver =

American politician and Union general (1817–1892)

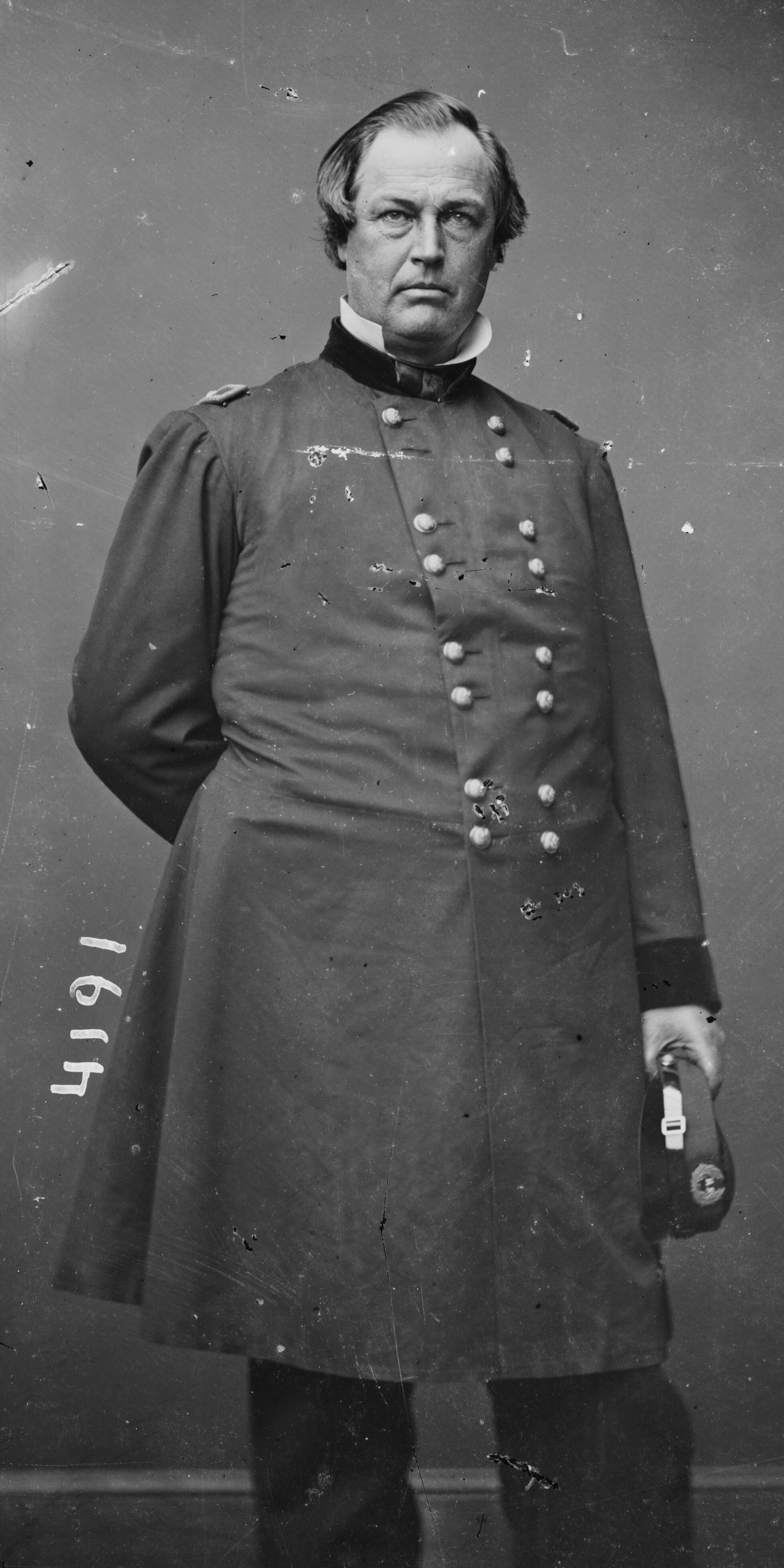
- Portrait by Brady c. 1861–1863

8th and 10th Commissioner of Indian Affairs
- In office November 8, 1858 – March 31, 1859
- President: James Buchanan
- Preceded by: Charles Eli Mix
- Succeeded by: Alfred B. Greenwood
- In office April 17, 1857 – June 17, 1857
- President: James Buchanan
- Preceded by: George Washington Manypenny
- Succeeded by: Charles Eli Mix

5th Territorial Governor of Kansas
- In office June 17, 1857 – November 8, 1858
- Appointed by: James Buchanan
- Preceded by: Robert J. Walker
- Succeeded by: Samuel Medary

Member of the U.S. House of Representatives from California's at-large district
- In office March 4, 1855 – March 3, 1857
- Preceded by: Milton S. Latham
- Succeeded by: Joseph C. McKibbin

2nd Secretary of State of California
- In office 1853–1855
- Governor: John Bigler
- Preceded by: William Van Voohies
- Succeeded by: Charles Hempstead

Personal details
- Born: James William Denver; October 23, 1817 Winchester, Virginia, U.S.
- Died: August 9, 1892 (aged 74) Washington, D.C., U.S.
- Party: Democratic
- Children: Matthew
- Education: Cincinnati Law School (LLB)

Military service
- Allegiance: United States (Union Army)
- Branch/service: United States Army
- Years of service: 1847–1850; 1861–1863
- Rank: Brigadier general
- Unit: Army of the Tennessee; Department of Kansas; XVI Corps
- Battles/wars: Mexican–American War; American Civil War; Siege of Corinth; Vicksburg campaign

James William Denver (/ˈdɛnvər/ DEN-vər), (October 23, 1817 – August 9, 1892) was an American politician, soldier, and lawyer. He served in the California state government, as an officer in the United States Army in two wars, and as a Democratic member of the United States House of Representatives from California. He served as secretary and Governor of the Kansas Territory during the struggle over whether or not Kansas would be open to slavery. The city of Denver, Colorado, is named after him.

== Early life and career ==
James W. Denver was born near Winchester, Virginia. His father was born in Ireland, while his mother was of English descent. He attended public schools and moved to Ohio with his parents in 1830, settling near Wilmington. In 1841 he taught school in Missouri, and in 1844 he graduated from the Cincinnati Law School. He was admitted to the bar and practiced law near Xenia, Ohio. He moved to Platte City, Missouri, in 1845, where he continued his law practice and acting career.

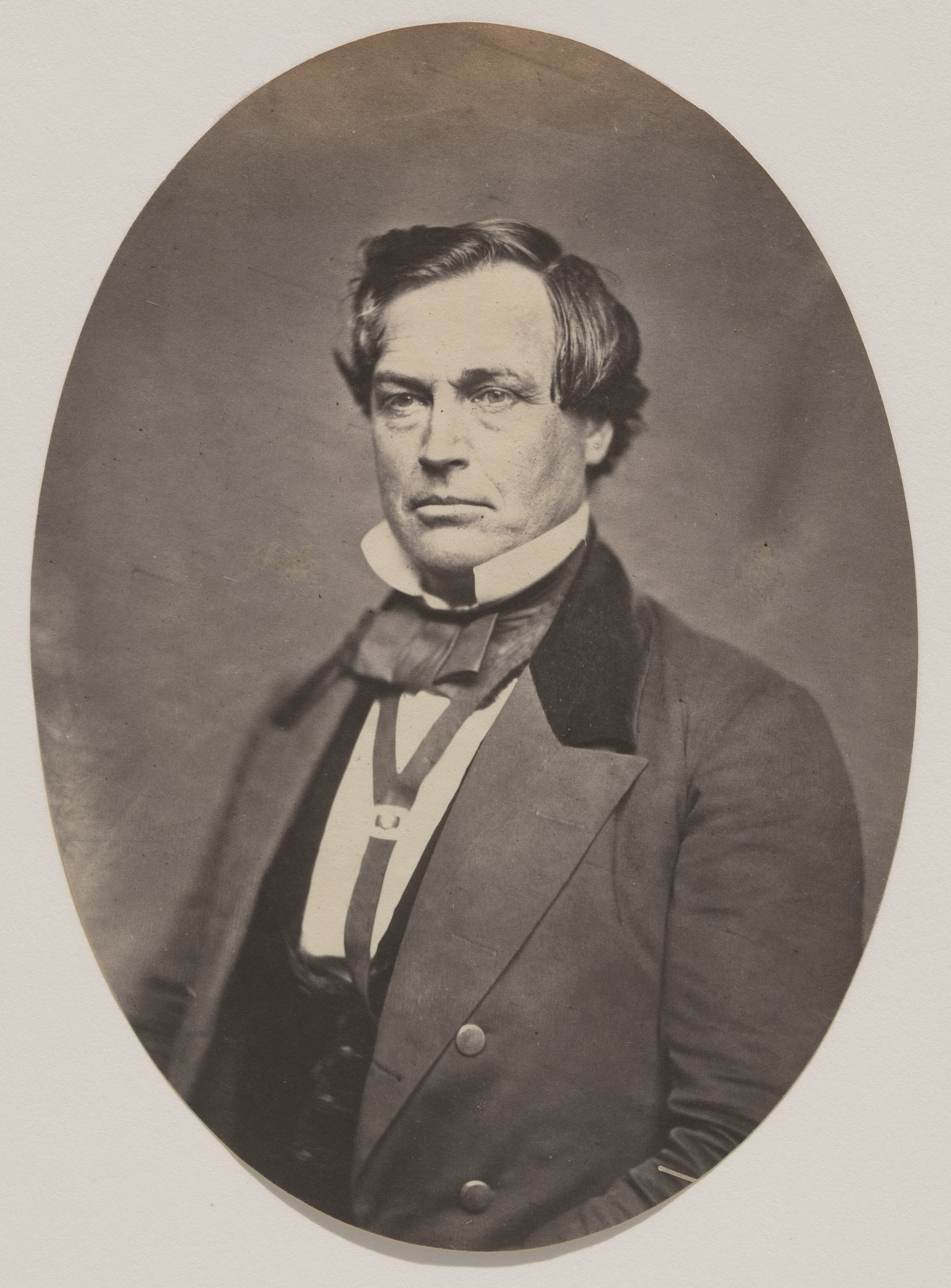
Denver c. 1856

In 1847, during the Mexican–American War, he recruited a company for the 12th U.S. Volunteer Infantry and was commissioned a captain, serving under General Winfield Scott. After the war in 1850, Denver traveled to California, where he became a trader. Denver killed newspaper editor Edward Gilbert in a duel on August 2, 1852. Later that same year, he was elected to the California State Senate. He was later appointed as Secretary of State of California. In 1854 he was elected to the United States Congress as a representative from California, serving from March 4, 1855 – March 3, 1857. He was not a candidate for renomination in 1856. On April 17, 1857, President James Buchanan appointed him as Commissioner of Indian Affairs.

On June 17, 1857, Denver was appointed by Buchanan as Secretary of the Kansas Territory. In December 1857 he was appointed as Territorial Governor. On the day that Denver assumed the territorial governorship, citizens in the territory voted on the Lecompton Constitution, which opened the territory to slavery. The vote offered a choice only between full slavery and limited slavery in the territory and was thus largely boycotted by Free-Staters who were in favor of abolishing slavery. The pro-slavery constitution passed by an overwhelming margin. Later it was discovered that several thousand votes were cast fraudulently by "Border Ruffians" who had crossed into the territory from Missouri in order to cast pro-slavery ballots; this scandal became known as Bleeding Kansas. (The vote was overturned by a subsequent election in August 1858, and Kansas was later admitted to the Union, in 1861, as a free state.)

In November 1858, while Denver was still serving as territorial governor, William Larimer, Jr., a land speculator from Leavenworth, planted the townsite of "Denver City" along the South Platte River in Arapaho County in western Kansas Territory (the present-day state of Colorado). Larimer chose the name "Denver" to honor the current territorial governor with the intention that the city would be chosen as the county seat of Arapaho County.

Denver retired as territorial governor in November 1858, was reappointed Commissioner of Indian Affairs, and served until his resignation on March 31, 1859.

== Civil War and later career ==
A few months after the start of the American Civil War in early 1861, President Abraham Lincoln commissioned Denver a brigadier general in the volunteer army on August 14. In November 1861, he was ordered to report to Fort Scott in Kansas and in December, he assumed command of all Federal troops in Kansas. During March and April 1862 he commanded the District of Kansas until he was transferred to the District of West Tennessee. On May 16, 1862, Denver assumed command of the 3rd Brigade/5th Division under Maj. Gen. William T. Sherman in the midst of the Siege of Corinth. The very next day Denver's brigade participated in the fight for Russell's House. Though his brigade suffered no casualties in this engagement it was nonetheless one of the two brigades leading the attack. On May 27 General Sherman again selected Denver's brigade to be one of the leading units in an attack against the Double Log House. Denver and Morgan L. Smith's brigade successfully stormed the log cabin turned block house. During this engagement Major General Ulysses S. Grant was present on the battlefield and indicated his approval of the handsome manner in which the troops behaved. After the fall of Corinth, Denver continued in command of his brigade, serving on garrison duty in Mississippi. During the early stages of the Vicksburg Campaign Denver was in command of the 1st Division, XVI Corps, until his resignation from the Union Army on March 5, 1863.

After the war, Denver practiced law in Washington, D.C., and Wilmington, Ohio; he and his family lived in the Rombach Place while residing in Wilmington. He served as a delegate to the Democratic National Convention in 1876, 1880, and 1884. He was mentioned as a possible Democratic presidential nominee in 1876 and 1884, although his name was never offered into formal nomination.

Denver reportedly visited Denver, Colorado, in 1875 and 1882, but complained that his visits received little affection from the residents of the city named after him.

He died in Washington, D.C., in 1892 and is buried in Sugar Grove Cemetery in Wilmington, Ohio.

His son, Matthew R. Denver, was a U.S. Congressman from Ohio from 1907 to 1913.

Political offices
Preceded by William Van Voohies	Secretary of State of California; 1853–1855	Succeeded by Charles Hempstead
Preceded by Robert J. Walker	Governor of the Kansas Territory; 1857–1858	Succeeded by Samuel Medary
U.S. House of Representatives
Preceded by Milton S. Latham	Member of the U.S. House of Representatives from California's at-large congressional district 1855–1857	Succeeded by Joseph C. McKibbin
