= Philemon T. Herbert =

American politician (1825–1864)

Member of the U.S. House of Representatives from California's at-large district
- In office March 4, 1855 – March 3, 1857
- Preceded by: James A. McDougall
- Succeeded by: Charles L. Scott

Personal details
- Born: November 1, 1825 Pine Apple, Alabama, U.S.
- Died: July 23, 1864 (aged 38) DeSoto Parish, Louisiana, U.S.
- Resting place: Evergreen Cemetery, Kingston, Louisiana, U.S.
- Party: Democratic
- Occupation: Lawyer, politician

Philemon Thomas Herbert (November 1, 1825 – July 23, 1864) was an American politician best known for killing a waiter who refused to serve him breakfast. He served as the Democratic U.S. Representative from California. He represented the California Second District in the 34th Congress from 1855 to 1857.

== Early life ==
Herbert was born on November 1, 1825, in Pine Apple, Alabama.

== Career ==
Herbert joined the Democratic Party. He served two terms in the California State Assembly, representing Mariposa County, California. From 1855 to 1857, he represented California's Second District in the 34th Congress of the United States House of Representatives.

In 1856, when he was refused breakfast service at Willard's Hotel in Washington because it was too late in the morning, he got into a quarrel with the Irish headwaiter, and shot and killed him. He was acquitted of manslaughter by a sympathetic jury, but abandoned his Congressional career.

In 1859, Herbert moved to El Paso, Texas, where he practiced law.

When the Civil War broke out in 1861, he joined the Confederate Army. He rose to the rank of lieutenant colonel, and commanded the Arizona Cavalry and the 7th Texas Cavalry Regiment. He was wounded at the Battle of Mansfield on April 8, 1864.

== Death ==
Herbert died of his wounds on July 23, 1864. He was buried at Evergreen Cemetery in Kingston, Louisiana.

== Other sources ==
- The New York Times, July 14, 1856.

Political offices
| Preceded by Samuel A. Merritt, Thomas E. Ridley | California State Assemblyman, 10th District; 1853-1854 (with Samuel Bell) | Succeeded by George N. Cornwall, Humphrey Griffith, Bernard C. Whitman |
| Preceded by Eight members | California State Assemblyman, 6th District (Mariposa County seat); 1854-1855 (with John C. Henry) | Succeeded by E. M. Burke, T. C. Flournoy |
U.S. House of Representatives
| Preceded by James A. McDougall | Member of the U.S. House of Representatives from California's at-large congressional district 1855-1857 | Succeeded by Charles L. Scott |
