= Edward Gilbert =

American politician (c. 1819–1852)

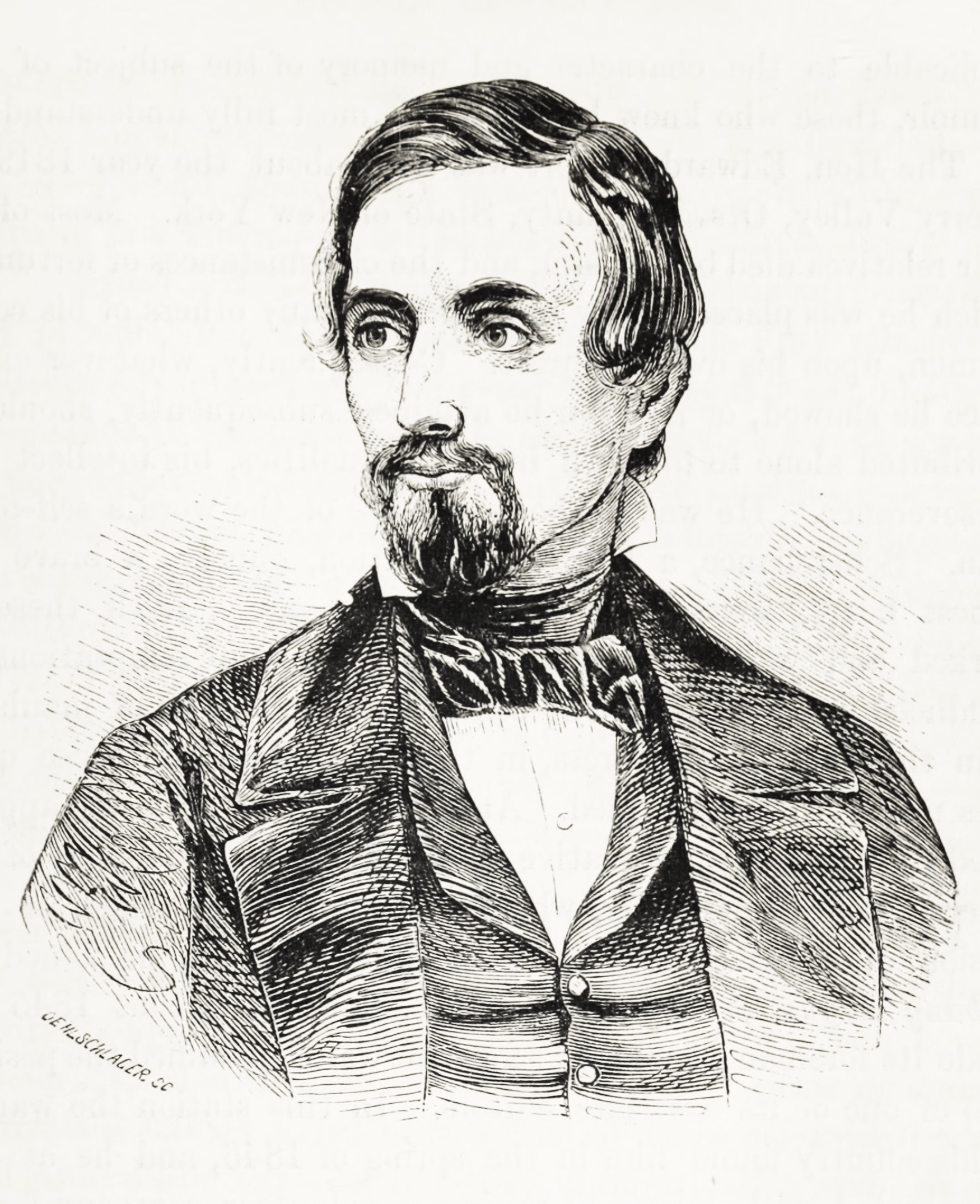
- Engraving of Gilbert from 1855

Member of the U.S. House of Representatives from California's at-large district
- In office September 11, 1850 – March 3, 1851
- Preceded by: Constituency established
- Succeeded by: Joseph W. McCorkle

Personal details
- Born: c. 1819 Cherry Valley, New York, U.S.
- Died: August 2, 1852 (aged 32–33) near Sacramento, California, U.S.
- Party: Democratic

Edward Gilbert (c. 1819 – August 2, 1852) was an American newspaper editor and Democratic California politician. From 1850 to 1851, he served briefly as a member of the United States House of Representatives.

== Biography ==
Gilbert was born in Cherry Valley, New York.

During the Mexican–American War of 1846–48, he served in the U.S. Army. After his regiment arrived in San Francisco, California in 1847, Gilbert was discharged from service and chose to remain in California.

In 1849, Gilbert partnered with businessman Edward Kemble and printer G. O. Hubbard to found the Alta California weekly paper, where Gilbert worked as senior editor for the next four years.

=== Political career ===
In September 1849, Gilbert became the youngest delegate to the Constitutional Convention, winning the San Francisco delegate position with 1,512 out of the 1,519 votes cast. He was elected in November 1849 at-large as one of California's first two Representatives in the 31st Congress, and served from September 11, 1850, until March 3, 1851.

=== Duel and death ===
In 1852, Gilbert wrote an article that charged General James W. Denver with "negligence and gross mismanagement" in an expedition to aid destitute immigrants, and the increasing conflict between Gilbert and Denver finally led Gilbert to challenge him to a duel. After several missed shots from both men, Denver shot Gilbert in the abdomen, killing him.

Gilbert was interred in Laurel Hill Cemetery, San Francisco. Later, after the city banned cemeteries within city-limits, his remains were removed and buried in the Laurel Hill Mound mass grave of Cyprus Lawn Memorial Park in Colma.

== Legacy ==
In 1995, Gilbert was posthumously inducted into the California Newspaper Hall of Fame.

U.S. House of Representatives
New constituency	Member of the U.S. House of Representatives from California's at-large congressional district Seat B 1850–1851	Succeeded by Joseph W. McCorkle
