= 1884 United States House of Representatives elections in California =

United States House of Representatives elections in California, 1884
- November 4, 1884

All 6 California seats to the United States House of Representatives
	Majority party	Minority party
Party	Republican	Democratic
Last election	0	6
Seats won	5	1
Seat change	▲5	▼5
Popular vote	97,334	95,192
Percentage	49.8%	48.7%
- Election results by district.

The United States House of Representatives elections in California, 1884 was an election for California's delegation to the United States House of Representatives, which occurred as part of the general election of the House of Representatives on November 4, 1884. Republicans won both newly created districts and three of the four existing districts.

== Overview ==
United States House of Representatives elections in California, 1884
Party	Votes	Percentage	Seats	+/–
Republican	97,334	49.8%	5	+5
Democratic	95,192	48.7%	1	-5
Prohibition	2,269	1.2%	0	0
Populist	633	0.3%	0	0
Totals	195,428	100.0%	6	—

== Delegation composition ==
Pre-election	Seats
Democratic-Held	6

Post-election	Seats
Republican-Held	5
Democratic-Held	1

== Results ==
=== District 1 ===
California's 1st congressional district election, 1884
Party	Candidate	Votes	%
Democratic	Barclay Henley	16,461	49.7
Republican	Thomas L. Carothers	16,316	49.3
Prohibition	C. C. Bateman	321	1.0
Total votes		33,098	100.0
Turnout			
Democratic hold			

=== District 2 ===
California's 2nd congressional district election, 1884
Party	Candidate	Votes	%
Republican	James A. Louttit	18,327	49.4
Democratic	Charles A. Sumner (incumbent)	18,208	49.1
Prohibition	Joshua B. Webster	558	1.5
Total votes		37,093	100.0
Turnout			
Republican gain from Democratic			

=== District 3 ===
California's 3rd congressional district election, 1884
Party	Candidate	Votes	%
Republican	Joseph McKenna	17,435	55.8
Democratic	John R. Glascock (incumbent)	13,197	42.3
Prohibition	Joshua B. Wills	322	1.0
Populist	A. B. Burns	273	0.9
Total votes		31,227	100.0
Turnout			
Republican win (new seat)			

=== District 4 ===
California's 4th congressional district election, 1884
Party	Candidate	Votes	%
Republican	William W. Morrow	15,083	58.8
Democratic	R. P. Hastings	10,422	40.6
Populist	H. S. Fitch	123	0.5
Prohibition	George Herman Babcock	15	0.1
Total votes		25,643	100.0
Turnout			
Republican gain from Democratic			

=== District 5 ===
California's 5th congressional district election, 1884
Party	Candidate	Votes	%
Republican	Charles N. Felton	17,014	51.7
Democratic	Frank J. Sullivan	15,676	47.6
Prohibition	William Crowhurst	232	0.7
Total votes		32,922	100.0
Turnout			
Republican gain from Democratic			

=== District 6 ===
California's 6th congressional district election, 1884
Party	Candidate	Votes	%
Republican	Henry Markham	17,397	49.1
Democratic	R. F. Del Valle	16,990	47.9
Prohibition	Will D. Gould	821	2.3
Populist	Isaac Kinley	237	0.7
Total votes		35,445	100.0
Turnout			
Republican win (new seat)			

== See also ==
- 49th United States Congress
- Political party strength in California
- Political party strength in U.S. states
- United States House of Representatives elections, 1884
