= Matthew Denver =

American politician (1870–1954)

Matthew R. Denver
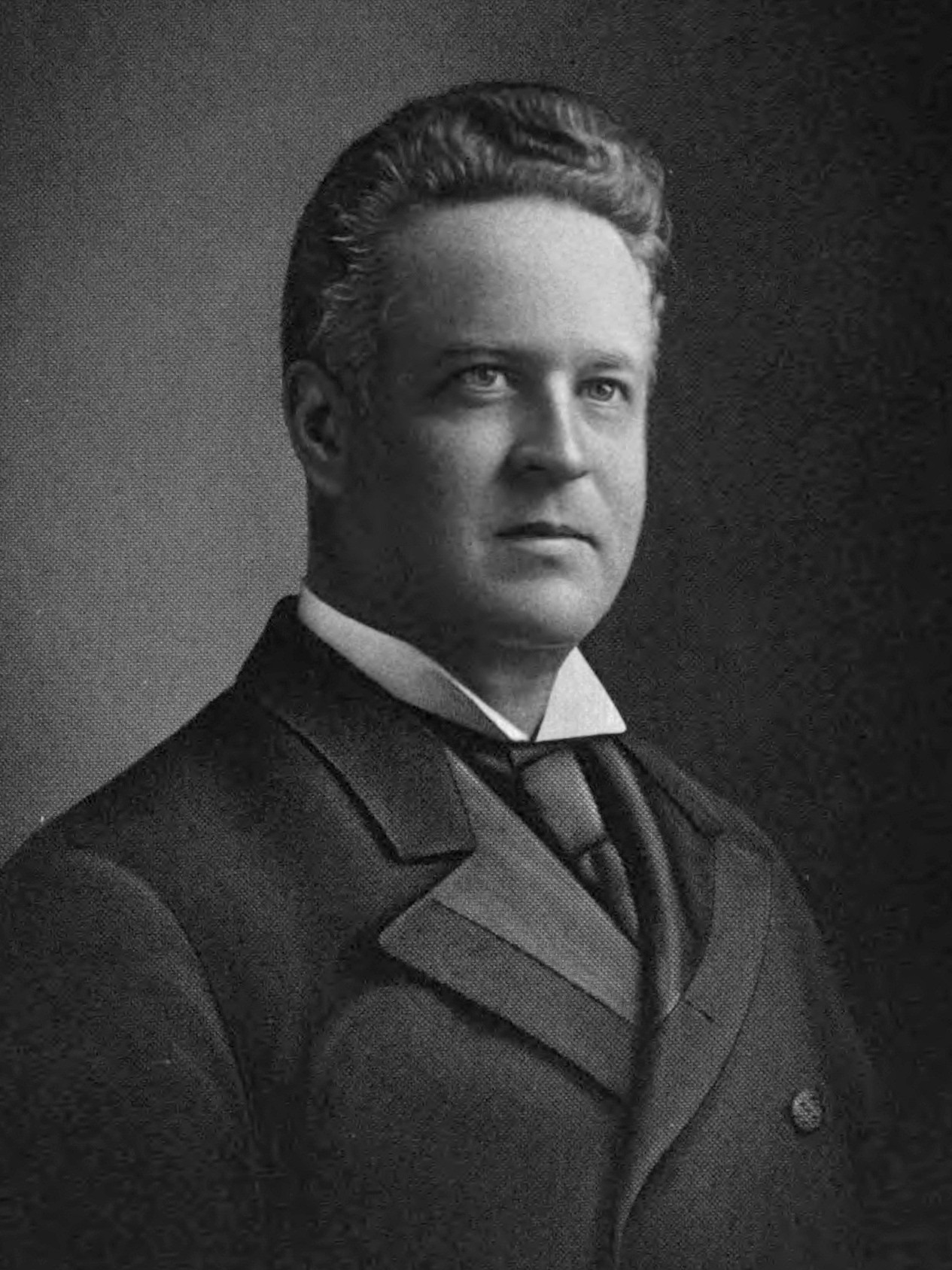

Member of the U.S. House of Representatives from Ohio's 6th district
- In office March 4, 1907 – March 3, 1913
- Preceded by: Thomas E. Scroggy
- Succeeded by: Simeon D. Fess

Personal details
- Born: Matthew Rombach Denver; December 21, 1870 Rombach Place, Wilmington, Ohio, US
- Died: May 13, 1954 (aged 83) Wilmington, Ohio, US
- Resting place: Sugar Grove Cemetery
- Party: Democratic
- Parent: James W. Denver (father)
- Education: Georgetown University
- Occupation: Banker
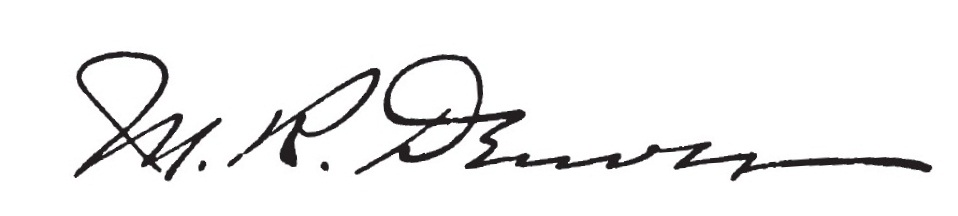
- Signature

Matthew Rombach Denver (December 21, 1870 – May 13, 1954) was an American businessman and politician who served as a three-term member of the U.S. representative from Ohio from 1907 to 1913. He was the son of James William Denver, who served as a member of Congress from California in the mid-19th century.

== Biography ==
Born in Rombach Place in Wilmington, Ohio, Denver attended public schools there. He graduated from Georgetown University in Washington, D.C. in 1892. He was involved in agriculture, banking and manufacturing. He served as delegate to the Democratic National Conventions in 1896, 1908, 1912, 1920, 1924, 1928, 1932, and 1936 and as a member of the Democratic State committee from 1896 to 1908.

=== Congress ===
Denver was elected as a Democrat to the Sixtieth, Sixty-first, and Sixty-second Congresses (March 4, 1907 – March 3, 1913). He declined candidacy for reelection in 1912 to the Sixty-third Congress.

=== Later career and death ===
He returned to banking in Wilmington and served as president of the Ohio Bankers' Association in 1918 and 1919.

Denver was again elected a member of the Democratic State committee for the 1926–1928 term. He served as president of the Clinton County National Bank & Trust Co. from 1902 until his death in Wilmington on May 13, 1954. His remains are interred at the Sugar Grove Cemetery.

== Sources ==
- United States Congress. "Matthew Denver (id: D000262)". Biographical Directory of the United States Congress.

U.S. House of Representatives
Preceded by Thomas E. Scroggy	Member of the U.S. House of Representatives from Ohio's 6th congressional district 1907–1913	Succeeded by Simeon D. Fess
