= Josiah Lamborn =

American politician and lawyer (1809–1847)

13th Attorney General of Illinois
- In office 1840–1843
- Preceded by: Wickliffe Kitchell
- Succeeded by: James A. McDougall

Personal details
- Born: January 31, 1809 Chester County, Pennsylvania, U.S.
- Died: March 31, 1847 (aged 38) White Hall, Illinois, U.S.
- Party: Democratic
- Education: Transylvania University

Josiah Lamborn (January 31, 1809 – March 31, 1847) was an American politician who served as attorney general of Illinois of Illinois from 1840 to 1843 and was the chief prosecuting attorney in the trial of five defendants accused in the killing of Joseph Smith.

== Early life and education ==
Lamborn was born in Chester County, Pennsylvania, and raised in Cincinnati and Washington County, Kentucky. He was educated at Transylvania University.

== Career ==
In the early 1830s, he moved to Jacksonville, Illinois, where he became involved as a leader of the anti-Jacksonian wing of the Democratic Party.

Lamborn was admitted to the Illinois State Bar Association in 1834. Early in his career, the Illinois Supreme Court found his professional conduct to be "highly censurable", but chose not to disbar or otherwise discipline him.

In December 1840, Lamborn was elected attorney general of Illinois. As attorney general, he appeared or argued before the Supreme Court of Illinois in 46 cases. During his tenure, it was rumored that Lamborn was corrupt and that he had accepted bribes. Lamborn failed to win the endorsement of the Democratic Party for reelection and his term ended in January 1843, when he was succeeded by James A. McDougall.

In 1844, Lamborn was appointed by Governor Thomas Ford as the chief prosecutor in the murder trial of Levi Williams, Thomas C. Sharp, Jacob C. Davis, Mark Aldrich, and William N. Grover. The five defendants were accused of conspiring to assassinate Mormon prophet Joseph Smith Jr. and his brother Hyrum Smith. The defendants were acquitted of these charges.

== Personal life ==
After his failure to gain re-election as attorney general, Lamborn had begun to drink heavily. He died of delirium tremens in White Hall, Illinois.

Legal offices
Preceded by Wyckliffe Kitchell	Attorney General of Illinois; 1840 – 1843	Succeeded by James A. McDougall
