= Joseph W. McCorkle =

American politician (1819-1884)

Joseph Walker McCorkle

Member of the U.S. House of Representatives from California's at-large district
- In office March 4, 1851 – March 3, 1853
- Preceded by: Edward Gilbert
- Succeeded by: James A. McDougall

Personal details
- Born: June 24, 1819 Piqua, Ohio
- Died: March 18, 1884 (aged 59) College Park, Maryland
- Resting place: Forest Hill Cemetery (Piqua, Ohio)
- Party: Democratic
- Education: Kenyon College

Joseph Walker McCorkle (June 24, 1819 – March 18, 1884) was an American lawyer and politician who served one term as a California congressman from 1851 to 1853.

== Early life ==
McCorkle was born in Piqua, Ohio on June 24, 1819. He attended Kenyon College as a member of the class of 1839, but left before graduating. He studied law and was admitted to the bar in 1842. He moved to Dayton, Ohio, where he established a law practice. From 1845 to 1849, McCorkle also served as Dayton's postmaster.

In 1849, McCorkle moved to San Francisco, California at the start of the gold rush. In 1850, he was an unsuccessful candidate for judge of California's Eighth Judicial District.

== Continued career ==
Later in 1850, McCorkle obtained the Democratic nomination for the California State Assembly. He won the general election and served one term, 1850 to 1852. In 1850, he was the Democratic nominee for Congress from California's 2nd District. He was elected and served one term, 1851 to 1853. He was an unsuccessful candidate for reelection in 1852.

On June 1, 1853, he fought a duel with William M. Gwin, a fellow Democrat and one of California's U.S. Senators, over the management of federal patronage. Gwin and McCorkle fired rifles at each other in San Mateo, California and came away unharmed. A donkey in a field several hundred yards away was accidentally struck and died.

== Later life ==
After leaving Congress, McCorkle moved from San Francisco to Marysville, California where he returned to practicing law. In 1853, he was appointed judge of the 9th Judicial District, and he served until 1857. In 1855, he was an unsuccessful candidate for U.S. Senator.

In 1857, McCorkle returned to San Francisco where he resumed practicing law. In 1860, just after the 1859 discovery of the Comstock Lode, he moved to nearby Virginia City, Nevada, where he practiced law until 1870. He left Virginia City to practice law in Washington, D.C., where he specialized in cases before the American-Mexican Claims Commission.

== Death and burial ==
In retirement, McCorkle resided in Branchville, College Park, Maryland. He died in Branchville on March 18, 1884. McCorkle was buried at Forest Hill Cemetery in Piqua, Ohio. He was a lifelong bachelor and had no children.

U.S. House of Representatives
Preceded by Edward Gilbert	Member of the U.S. House of Representatives from California's at-large congressional district 1851-1853	Succeeded by James A. McDougall
