= James A. McDougall =

American politician (1817–1867)

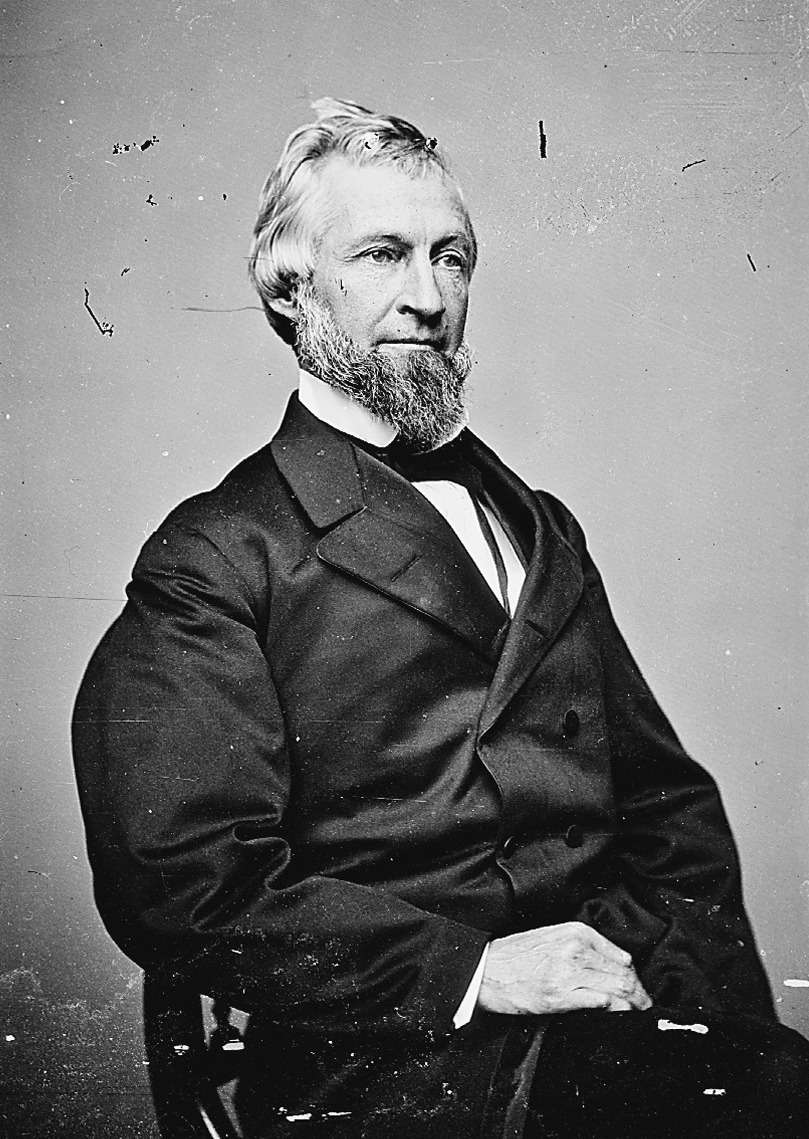
- McDougall c. 1860–1865

United States Senator from California
- In office March 4, 1861 – March 3, 1867
- Preceded by: William M. Gwin
- Succeeded by: Cornelius Cole

Member of the U.S. House of Representatives from California's at-large district
- In office March 4, 1853 – March 3, 1855
- Preceded by: Joseph W. McCorkle
- Succeeded by: Philemon T. Herbert

2nd Attorney General of California
- In office 1850–1851
- Governor: Peter Hardeman Burnett
- Preceded by: Edward J. C. Kewen
- Succeeded by: Serranus Clinton Hastings

14th Attorney General of Illinois
- In office 1843–1846
- Governor: Thomas Ford
- Preceded by: Josiah Lamborn
- Succeeded by: David B. Campbell

Personal details
- Born: November 19, 1817 Bethlehem, New York, U.S.
- Died: September 3, 1867 (aged 49) Albany, New York, U.S.
- Resting place: Holy Cross Cemetery, Colma, California, US
- Party: Union; Democrat
- Occupation: Attorney, Politician

James Alexander McDougall (November 19, 1817 – September 3, 1867) was an American attorney and politician elected to statewide office in two U.S. states, then to the United States House of Representatives and United States Senate. A gifted orator, McDougall began his career as a civil engineer in New York, then read law, rising quickly to heights in his profession in Illinois, where he became a friend of fellow Illinois attorneys Abraham Lincoln, Edward D. Baker, and Stephen Douglas. Like many Americans, McDougall was drawn to Gold Rush California in 1849; he resumed his law practice and was elected second attorney general for the new state of California. In the election of 1860, Lincoln won the presidency as a Republican, Baker was elected Republican senator from Oregon, and McDougall was elected senator from California, joining Douglas in the Senate as fellow War Democrats. All three of McDougall's Illinois friends would die in the six years before his term as senator expired. A noted drinker, McDougall once gave an address to the Senate disparaging a proposed rule to outlaw the sale of alcohol in the United States Capitol, but died shortly after leaving the Senate, "...hastened by his indulgence in the bowl."

== Early life ==
James Alexander McDougall was born on November 19, 1817, in Bethlehem, New York, and educated in the Albany grammar schools, where he excelled in mathematics and civil engineering. While still a young man, McDougall assisted the survey of the Mohawk and Hudson Railroad, later known as the Albany and Schenectady, one of the first railroads in the nation. McDougall began the study of law in Albany before moving westward, settled in Pike County, Illinois, in 1838, married the daughter of a leading Jacksonville attorney, and joined the Democratic Party. He completed his study and began practicing law in Cook County, where McDougall soon made the acquaintance of another rising Chicago lawyer, Stephen A. Douglas.

== Political career ==
=== Illinois ===
In January 1843 the 25-year-old McDougall was elected Illinois Attorney General; he was re-elected in 1844. "Small in stature, he had uncommon strength of constitution, as well as of mind. He was a brilliant speaker, skillfully wielding the weapons of repartee, humor, and sarcasm, and made himself one of the most noted speakers of the West." During his tenure in the state capitol, Springfield, Illinois, rising tensions in Nauvoo, Illinois, gave way to violence when on June 27, 1844, the founder of the Latter Day Saint movement, Joseph Smith was killed by a mob after surrendering to the custody and protection of the state. McDougall was involved in the negotiations by which the Mormons agreed to leave Illinois. Following his two terms as state attorney general, McDougall returned to private practice in Chicago, establishing a law partnership with Ebenezer Peck.

While traveling the circuit and serving as attorney general in Illinois, McDougall became friendly with many fellow lawyers, including Douglas, Edward D. Baker and Abraham Lincoln. By 1849, McDougall had been twelve years in the Prairie State of Illinois, and had made himself "one of the most popular men of his state," but like many of his age was still looking westward. McDougall organized and accompanied an exploration of the Rio del Norte, Gila and Colorado Rivers reaching the headwaters of the Rio Grande in what would soon become southwestern Colorado Territory. Hearing news of the California Gold Rush, McDougall returned to Illinois, gathered up his family and possessions, and took the new steamship California to San Francisco.

=== California ===
Engraving by John Chester Buttre c. 1853–1855

Resuming his law practice, McDougall was elected California Attorney General in October 1850 but resigned after a year to accept a seat in the state legislature.

In 1852 McDougall successfully ran for Congress as a Democrat, pledging to get federal support for a railroad to the Pacific. He did introduce a Pacific Railroad bill, but it was opposed by Thomas Hart Benton. McDougall served a single term in the House before returning to law practice in San Francisco.

In the late 1850s, the Democrats in California split into factions over the issue of slavery, and the election of a California Senator in 1861 became entangled in the national crisis over secession. When it appeared that a secessionist Democrat might be elected, Republicans abandoned their own candidate and threw their support to McDougall.

=== Washington, D.C. ===
While serving in the U.S. Senate during the Civil War, McDougall again worked on behalf of a Pacific railroad project, but alcohol abuse made him ineffective. By 1862, McDougall was making a spectacle of himself and neglecting his Senate duties. He fought against some of Lincoln's war measures, but he was mostly dysfunctional. Not once did he travel back to California during his entire six-year term.

McDougall was one of six senators to oppose the Thirteenth Amendment to the United States Constitution.

== Later life ==
Upon leaving office, McDougall retired to his boyhood home in Albany, New York, where he died on September 3, 1867, presumably of alcoholism. His body was sent to California, per his wishes, and buried in Lone Mountain Cemetery in San Francisco, later renamed Calvary; his remains were reinterred at Holy Cross Cemetery in Colma, California, in 1942.

Legal offices
Preceded by Josiah Lamborn	Attorney General of Illinois; 1843 –1846	Succeeded by David B. Campbell
Preceded by Edward J. C. Kewen	Attorney General of California; 1850 –1851	Succeeded by Serranus Clinton Hastings
U.S. House of Representatives
Preceded by Joseph W. McCorkle	Member of the U.S. House of Representatives from California's at-large congressional district 1853-1855	Succeeded by Philemon T. Herbert
U.S. Senate
Preceded by William M. Gwin	U.S. senator (Class 3) from California; 1861–1867; Served alongside: Milton S. Latham, John Conness	Succeeded by Cornelius Cole
