= Joseph C. McKibbin =

American politician (1824–1896)

Joseph C. McKibbon
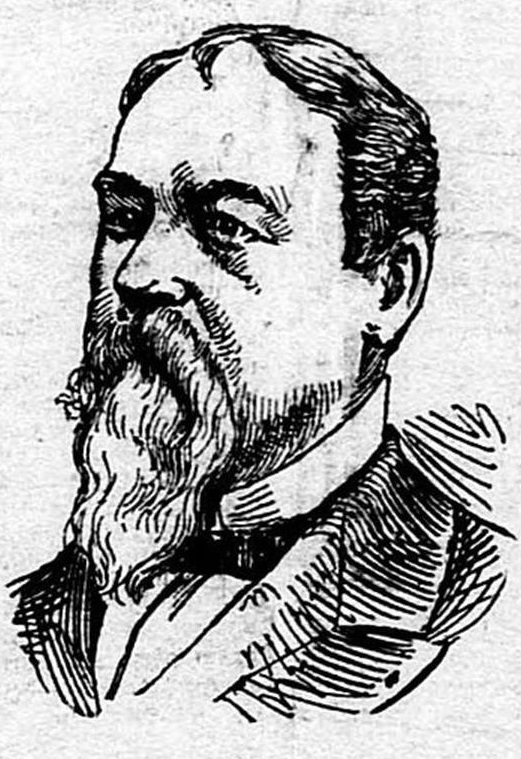

Member of the U.S. House of Representatives from California's At-Large district
- In office March 4, 1857 – March 3, 1859
- Preceded by: James W. Denver
- Succeeded by: John C. Burch

Personal details
- Born: Joseph Chambers McKibbin; May 14, 1824
- Died: July 1, 1896 (aged 72)
- Party: Democratic

Joseph Chambers McKibbin (May 14, 1824 – July 1, 1896) was an American lawyer, Civil War veteran, and California Democratic politician who served one term in the United States House of Representatives from 1857 to 1859.

== Early life and career ==
McKibbin was born 1824 in Chambersburg, Pennsylvania. One of his brothers was David B. McKibbin.

He received a common-school education then attended Princeton College 1840–1842. He moved to California in 1849 during the California Gold Rush, settling in Sierra County. He studied law and was admitted to the bar in 1852, practicing in Downieville.

== Political career ==
McKibbin was a member of the California State Senate in 1852 and 1853, then elected as a Democrat to the 35th Congress, and served from 1857 to 1859. He lost his bid for re-election in 1858.

== Civil War ==
During the Civil War McKibbin enlisted in the Union Army in 1861 and was one of the first six Cavalry officers appointed by President Abraham Lincoln. He served as a colonel and aide-de-camp on the staffs of Major General Henry W. Halleck and Major General George H. Thomas.

== Later career and death ==
Soldiers playing poker at Camp McKibbin, his namesake camp, at Marshall Hall in 1893.

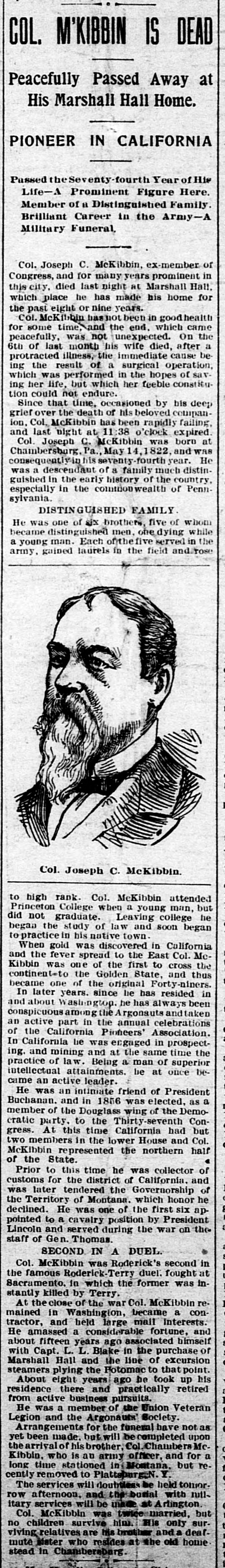
McKibbin's obituary from 'The Evening Times' (Washington, DC), July 2, 1896

After the Civil War, McKibbon settled in Washington, D.C., as a general contractor. He purchased the property at Marshall Hall, Maryland, in 1883.

McKibbin died on July 1, 1896, in Marshall Hall, Maryland, and is buried in Arlington National Cemetery.

U.S. House of Representatives
Preceded by James W. Denver	Member of the U.S. House of Representatives from California's at-large congressional district March 4, 1857 – March 3, 1859	Succeeded by John C. Burch
