= Wickliffe Kitchell =

American politician and lawyer

12th Illinois Attorney General
- In office 1839–1840
- Governor: Thomas Carlin
- Preceded by: George W. Olney
- Succeeded by: Josiah Lamborn

Member of the Illinois Senate
- In office 1828–1832

Member of the Illinois House of Representatives
- In office 1820–1822

Personal details
- Born: May 21, 1789 New Jersey, U.S.
- Died: January 2, 1869 (aged 79) Pana, Illinois, U.S.
- Party: Republican
- Other political affiliations: Democratic
- Profession: Politician, lawyer

Wickliffe Kitchell (May 21, 1789 – January 2, 1869) was an American politician and lawyer.

Born in New Jersey, Kitchell moved to southern Indiana in 1814. While clearing his land, Kitchell badly injured his foot causing him to be lame for the rest of his life. He studied law and was admitted to the Indiana bar in 1817. While living in Indiana, Kitchell was appointed sheriff. In 1817, Kitchell moved to Palestine, Crawford County, Illinois Territory. From 1820 to 1822, Kitchell served in the Illinois House of Representatives and then served in the Illinois State Senate from 1828 to 1832. He also served as state attorney. In 1838, Kitchell moved to Hillsboro, Montgomery County, Illinois. In 1839, Kitchell was appointed Illinois Attorney General and served until 1840, when he resigned to serve another term in the Illinois House of Representatives. Kitchell was a Democrat and then became a member of the Republican Party after the Kansas-Nebraska Act was passed. From 1846 to 1854, Kitchell lived in Fort Madison, Iowa. He then moved back to Hillsboro, Illinois in 1854. Kitchell died in Pana, Illinois in 1869.

== Notes ==
Legal offices
Preceded by George W. Olney	Attorney General of Illinois; 1839 – 1840	Succeeded by Josiah Lamborn
