= Cornelius Cole =

American politician (1822–1924)

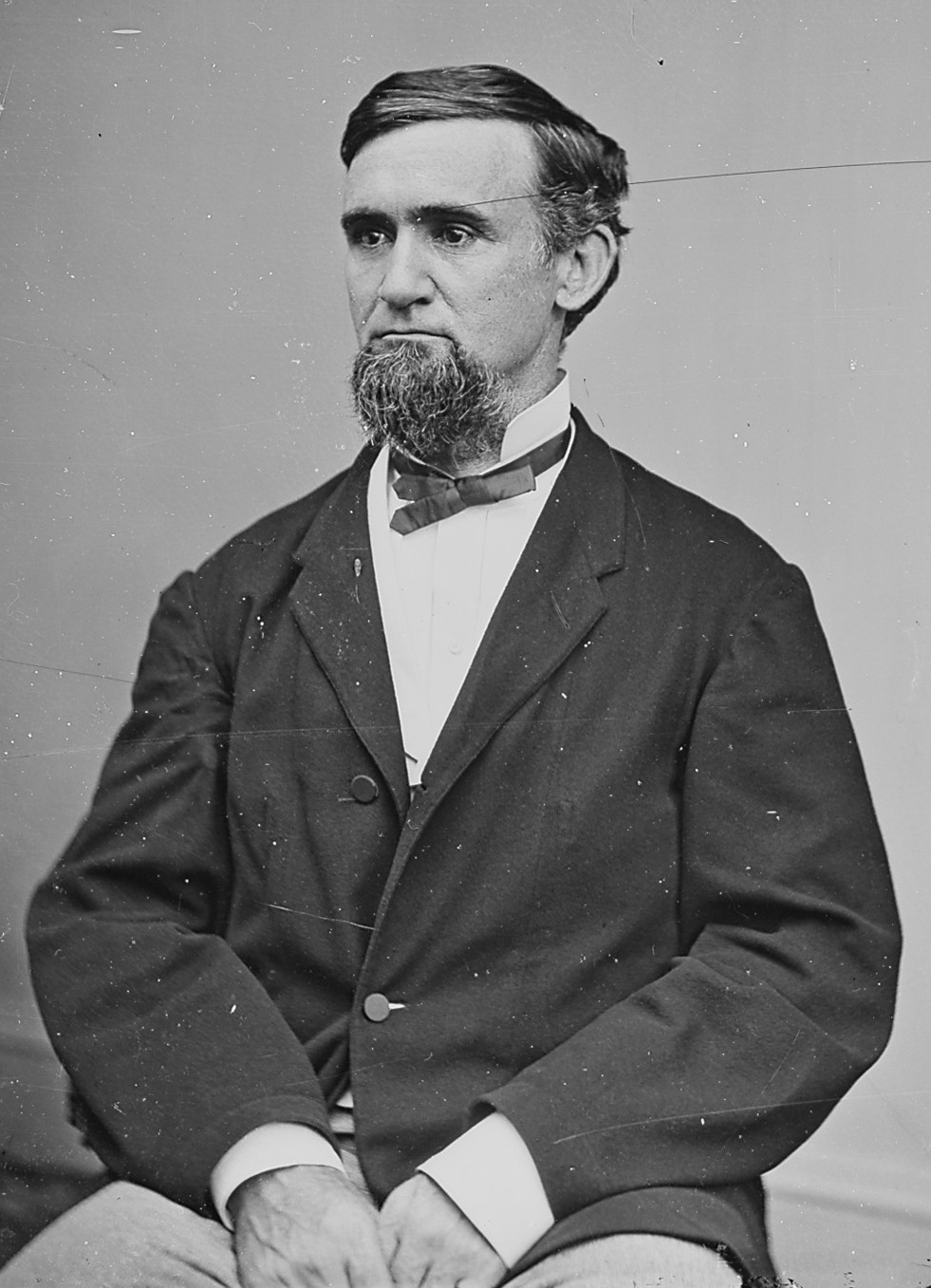
- Portrait by Brady c. 1860–1865

United States Senator from California
- In office March 4, 1867 – March 3, 1873
- Preceded by: James A. McDougall
- Succeeded by: Aaron A. Sargent

Member of the U.S. House of Representatives from California's at-large district
- In office March 4, 1863 – March 3, 1865
- Preceded by: Timothy Guy Phelps
- Succeeded by: Seat eliminated

Member of the Republican National Committee from California
- In office 1856–1860
- Preceded by: Position established
- Succeeded by: David W. Cheesman

Personal details
- Born: September 17, 1822 Lodi, New York, U.S.
- Died: November 3, 1924 (aged 102) Los Angeles, California, U.S.
- Resting place: Hollywood Forever Cemetery
- Party: Republican
- Other political affiliations: National Union
- Spouse: Olive Colegrove (m. 1853)
- Children: 9
- Education: Wesleyan University
- Profession: Lawyer

Military service
- Allegiance: United States (Union)
- Service: California Militia
- Years of service: 1863
- Rank: Captain
- Unit: 1st California Cavalry Battalion
- Commands: Santa Cruz Troop, 1st California Cavalry Battalion
- Wars: American Civil War

Cornelius Cole (September 17, 1822 – November 3, 1924) was an American politician who served a single term in the United States House of Representatives as a Republican representing California from 1863 to 1865, and another term in the United States Senate from 1867 to 1873. Cole, who died at the age of 102 years, 47 days, is the longest-lived U.S. Senator.

== Early life and education ==
Cornelius Cole was born in Lodi, New York on September 17, 1822. He received his education at local common schools, Ovid Academy in Ovid, Lima Seminary in Lima, and Hobart College in Geneva. He graduated from Wesleyan University of Middletown, Connecticut in 1847, studied law with William H. Seward, and was admitted to the bar in 1848. After a year mining gold in California, in 1849 he began to practice law, first in San Francisco, then in Sacramento.

== Political career ==
On March 8, 1856, Cole was one of the organizers of the California branch of the Republican Party, acting as secretary and writing its initial manifesto. He served on the Republican National Committee from 1856 to 1860. From August 1856 to January 1857, he and James McClatchy edited the Sacramento Daily Times.

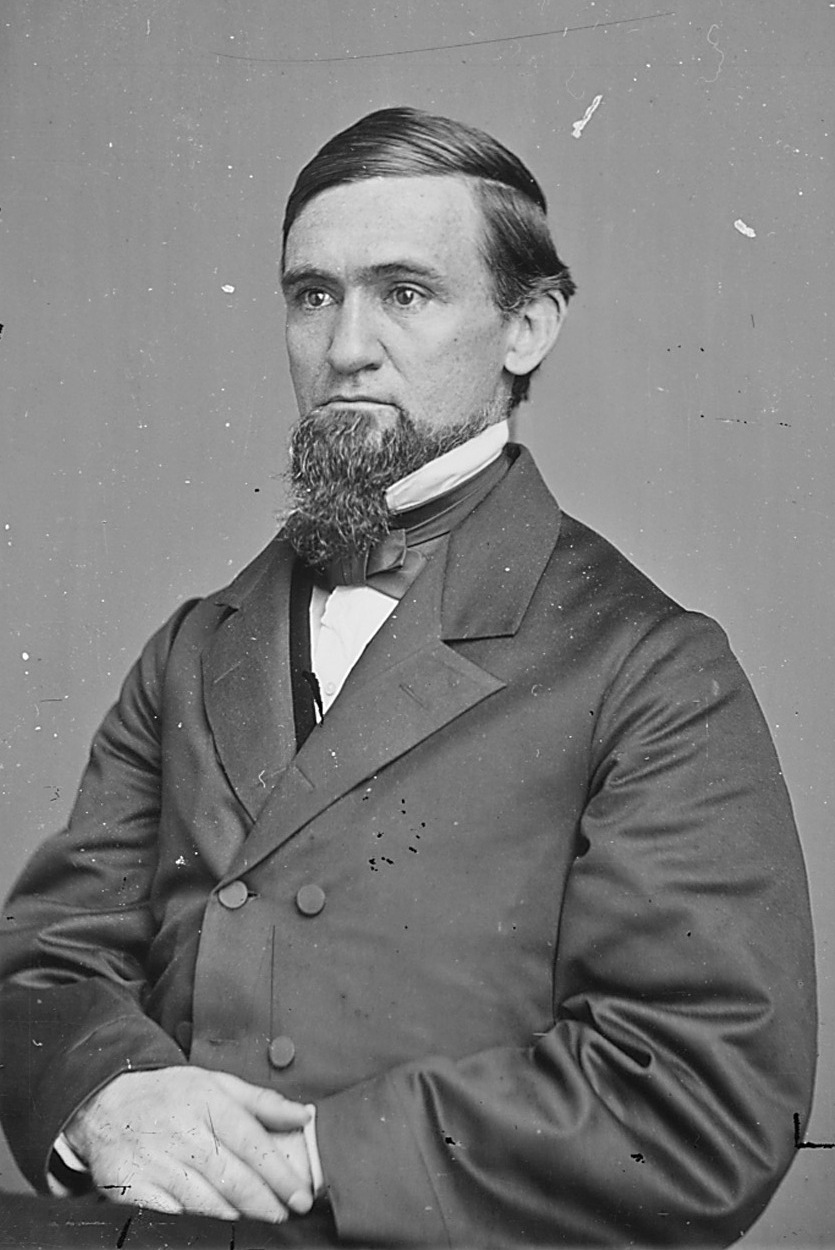
Portrait by Brady c. 1860–1865

Cole was nominated for Clerk of Sacramento Court on the Republican ticket, but was unsuccessful. In 1858 he was elected District Attorney of Sacramento County. In 1862 he and his family moved to Santa Cruz. During the American Civil War, Cole supported the Union. In 1863, he was commissioned as a captain after winning an election to command the Santa Cruz Cavalry Troop, a unit he helped raise for the California Militia. However, he did not actively command it as he had recently been elected to Congress.

In 1862, Cole was elected to the United States House of Representatives as a Union Republican, and he served one term, March 4, 1863 to March 3, 1865. During his tenure, he supported the creation of the Freedmen's Bureau. On November 19, 1863, he traveled to Gettysburg, Pennsylvania with Abraham Lincoln. He was on the speaker's platform near Lincoln, and watched him deliver the Gettysburg Address. On April 14, 1865, Cole spoke with Lincoln a few hours before Lincoln was assassinated.

In 1865, Cole was elected to the United States Senate, serving one term from March 4, 1867 to March 3, 1873. During the final two years of his tenure, he served as chairman of the Appropriations Committee. He was one of the 35 senators who voted in favor of the impeachment of Andrew Johnson. He later supported the proposed annexation of Santo Domingo.

== Later life ==
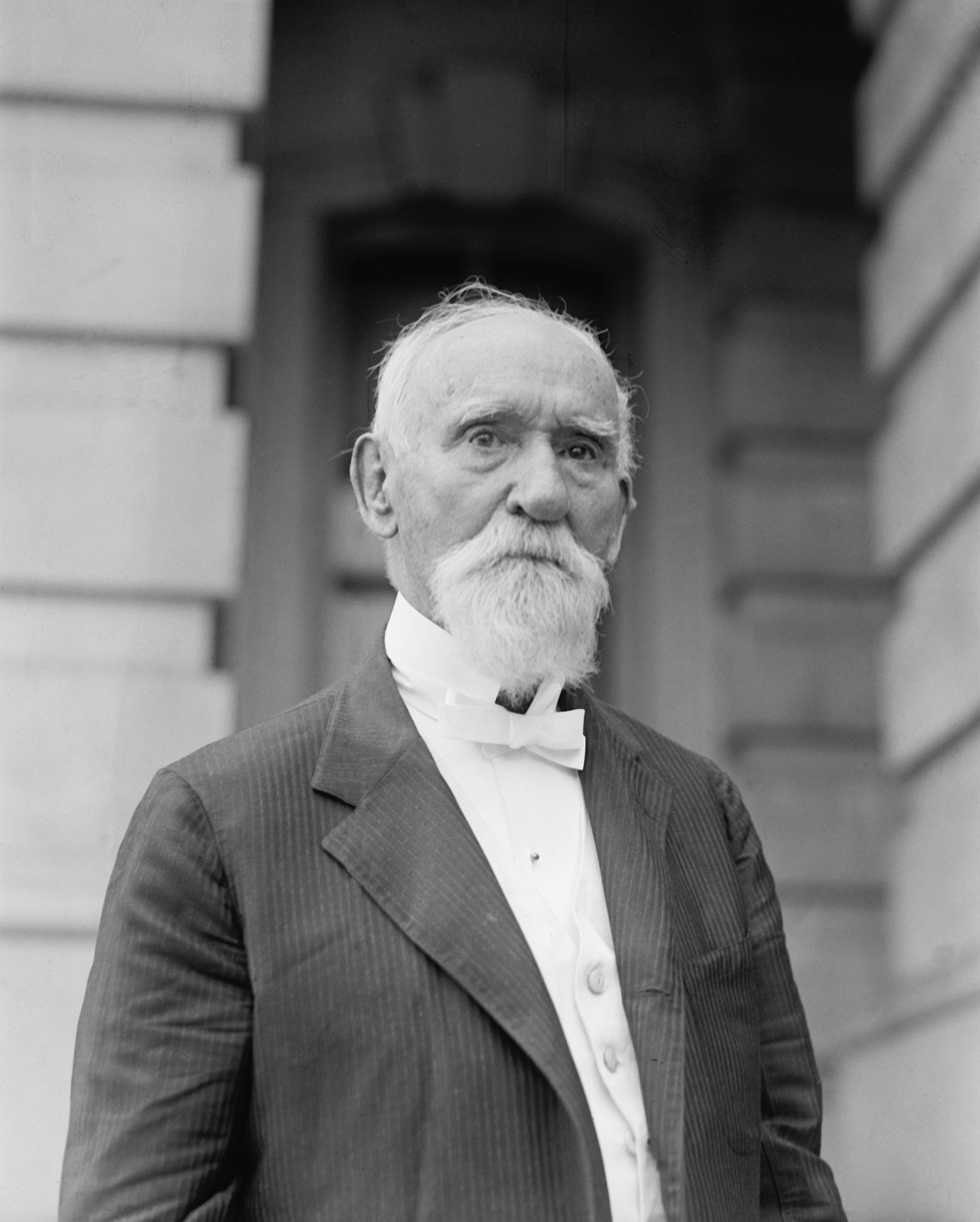
Cornelius Cole in June 1922 at age 99

Following his retirement from politics, Cole returned to California and practiced law in San Francisco and Los Angeles. In 1880, he moved to Colegrove, a settlement he founded on land that had been part of Rancho La Brea; he acquired the land from owner Henry Hancock as payment for helping Hancock confirm title to Rancho La Brea. Colegrove was named for Cole's wife, and several streets were named for his children, including Willoughby Avenue, Eleanor Street and Seward Street. Cole turned 100 years old in 1922.

== Death and burial ==
Cole died of pneumonia in Los Angeles on November 3, 1924. He was buried at Hollywood Forever Cemetery.

At age 102, Cole is the longest-lived U.S. Senator.

== Family ==
In January 1853, Cole married Olive Colegrove of Trumansburg, New York. They were the parents of nine children.

Cole's brother, George W. Cole, was a Union Army officer in the American Civil War who attained the rank of major general by brevet. After the war, George Cole was acquitted of the murder of L. Harris Hiscock, whom he accused of having an affair with Mrs. Cole.

== Works ==
- Memoirs of Cornelius Cole, Ex-Senator of the United States From California. New York: McLoughlin Brothers. 1908.

== Sources ==
- Catherine Coffin Phillips, "Cornelius Cole California Pioneer" (San Francisco, 1929)
- Leonard L. Richards, "The California Gold Rush and the Coming of the Civil War" (New York 2007)

U.S. House of Representatives
Preceded by Timothy Guy Phelps	Member of the U.S. House of Representatives from California's at-large congressional district 1863–1865	Seat eliminated
U.S. Senate
Preceded by James A. McDougall	U.S. senator (Class 3) from California; 1867–1873; Served alongside: John Conness, Eugene Casserly	Succeeded by Aaron A. Sargent
Honorary titles
Preceded by John Conness	Oldest living U.S. senator January 10, 1909 – November 3, 1924	Succeeded by Chauncey Depew
Preceded by George Edmunds	Most senior living U.S. senator (Sitting or former); February 27, 1919 – November 3, 1924	Succeeded by Adelbert Ames
Preceded by Daniel T. Jewett	Oldest United States senator ever October 11, 1921 – present	Succeeded by Current
