= John Chilton Burch =

American politician (1826–1885)

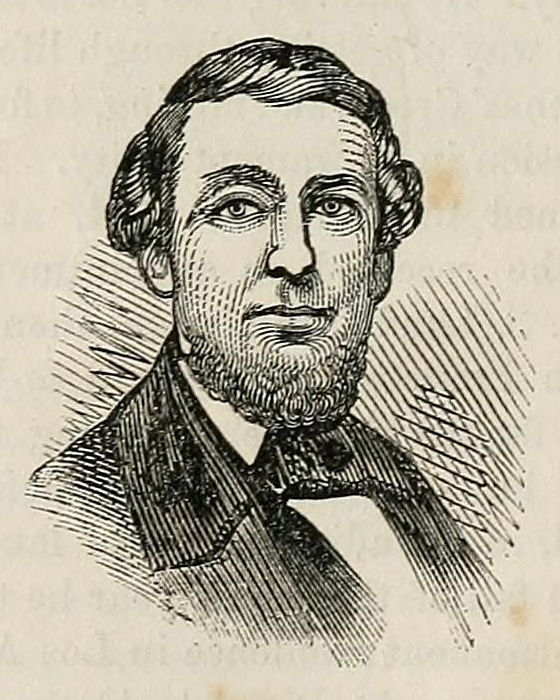
- Engraving of Burch published 1858

Member of the U.S. House of Representatives from California's at-large district
- In office March 4, 1859 – March 3, 1861
- Preceded by: Joseph McKibbin
- Succeeded by: Timothy Guy Phelps

Personal details
- Born: February 1, 1826 Boone County, Missouri, U.S.
- Died: August 17, 1885 (aged 59) San Francisco, California, U.S.
- Party: Democratic
- Education: Kemper College

John Chilton Burch (February 1, 1826 – August 31, 1885) was an American lawyer from California. He became a Democratic politician who served one term as a United States Congressman from 1859 to 1861.

== Biography ==
Burch was born in Boone County, Missouri. He attended the Bonne Femme Academy and Kemper College, and then studied law in Jefferson City, Missouri. Burch was admitted to the bar, practiced law, then became deputy clerk of Cole County, Missouri, and Assistant Adjutant General of Missouri.

=== Political career ===
Burch moved to California in 1850 during the California Gold Rush and worked in the mines until 1851. He was elected clerk of the newly organized Trinity County, and was appointed district attorney in 1853.

Burch was elected to the California State Assembly in 1856 and then served in the California State Senate until 1859.

He was elected as a Democrat to the 36th Congress (1859–61).

=== Later career ===
After serving one term, he resumed the practice of law in San Francisco. He was appointed a code commissioner and served four years, but declined to be a candidate for Judge of the Supreme Court of California.

=== Death ===
Burch died 1885 in San Francisco and is interred in the Sacramento Historic City Cemetery in Sacramento, California.

California Assembly
Preceded by W. W. Upton	California State Assemblyman, 12th District (Trinity County seat); 1857 – 1858	Succeeded by R. P. Hirst, A. B. Walker
U.S. House of Representatives
Preceded by Joseph C. McKibbin	Member of the U.S. House of Representatives from California's at-large congressional district March 4, 1859 – March 3, 1861	Succeeded by Timothy Guy Phelps
