= Charles A. Sumner =

American politician

Charles Allen Sumner
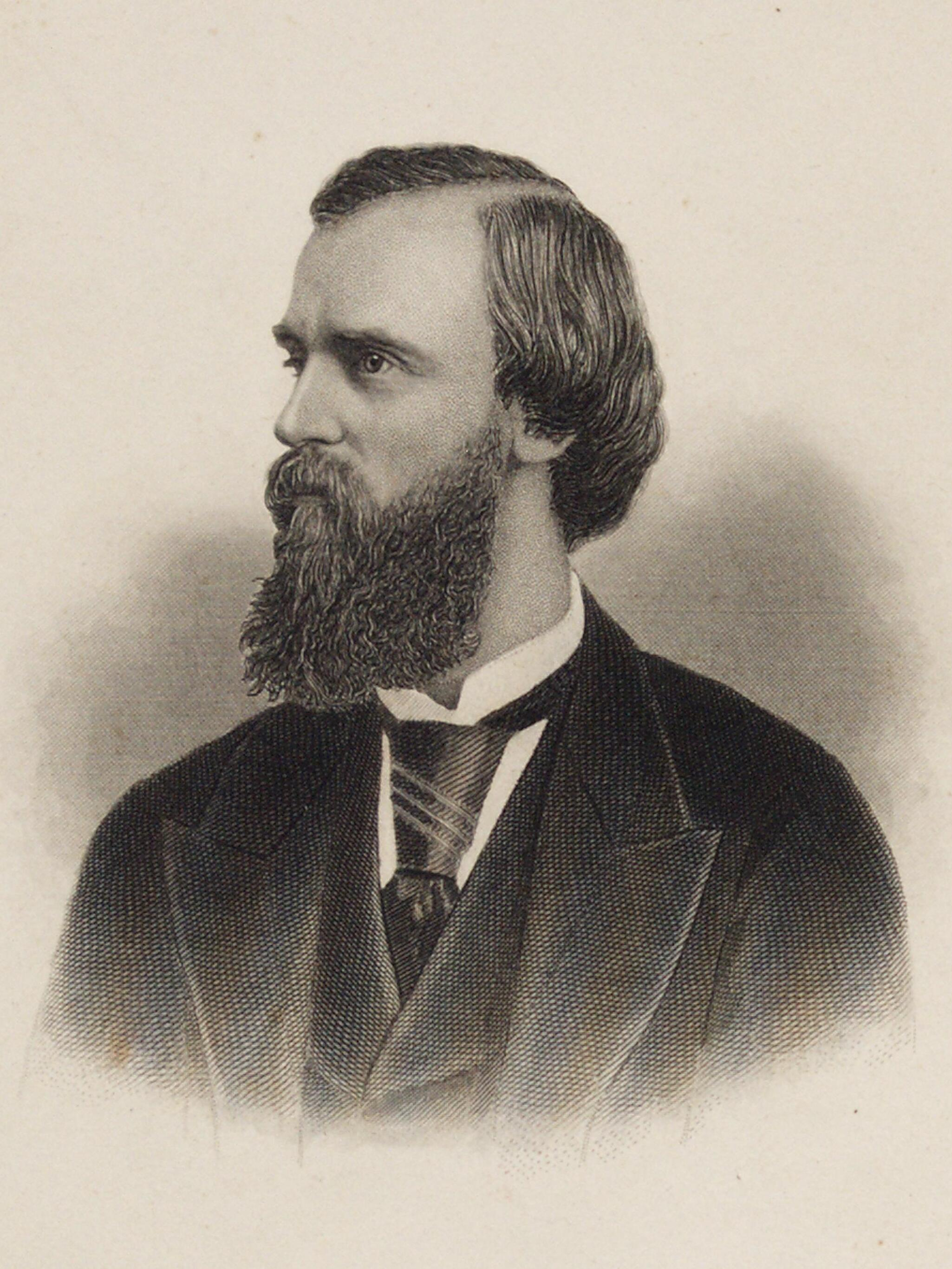

Member of the U.S. House of Representatives from California's at-large district
- In office March 4, 1883 – March 3, 1885
- Preceded by: District established
- Succeeded by: District abolished

Member of the Nevada Senate from the Storey County district
- In office November 1864 – November 1868

Personal details
- Born: August 2, 1835 Great Barrington, Massachusetts, U.S.
- Died: January 31, 1903 (aged 67) San Francisco, California, U.S.
- Party: Democratic
- Education: Trinity College
- Occupation: Stenographer, lawyer, politician

Military service
- Allegiance: United States
- Branch/service: United States Volunteers; Union Army
- Years of service: 1862–1864; 1864–1865
- Rank: Assistant Quartermaster; Colonel
- Commands: 1st Nevada Infantry Battalion
- Battles/wars: American Civil War

Charles Allen Sumner (August 2, 1835 – January 31, 1903) was an American stenographer, lawyer and politician who served one term in the United States House of Representatives from 1883 and 1885, representing California.

== Early life ==
Born in Great Barrington, Massachusetts, Sumner attended Trinity College in Hartford, Connecticut, but did not graduate. He subsequently studied law, but was chiefly interested in stenography. He was admitted to the bar in 1867 and engaged in patent practice.

== Political career ==
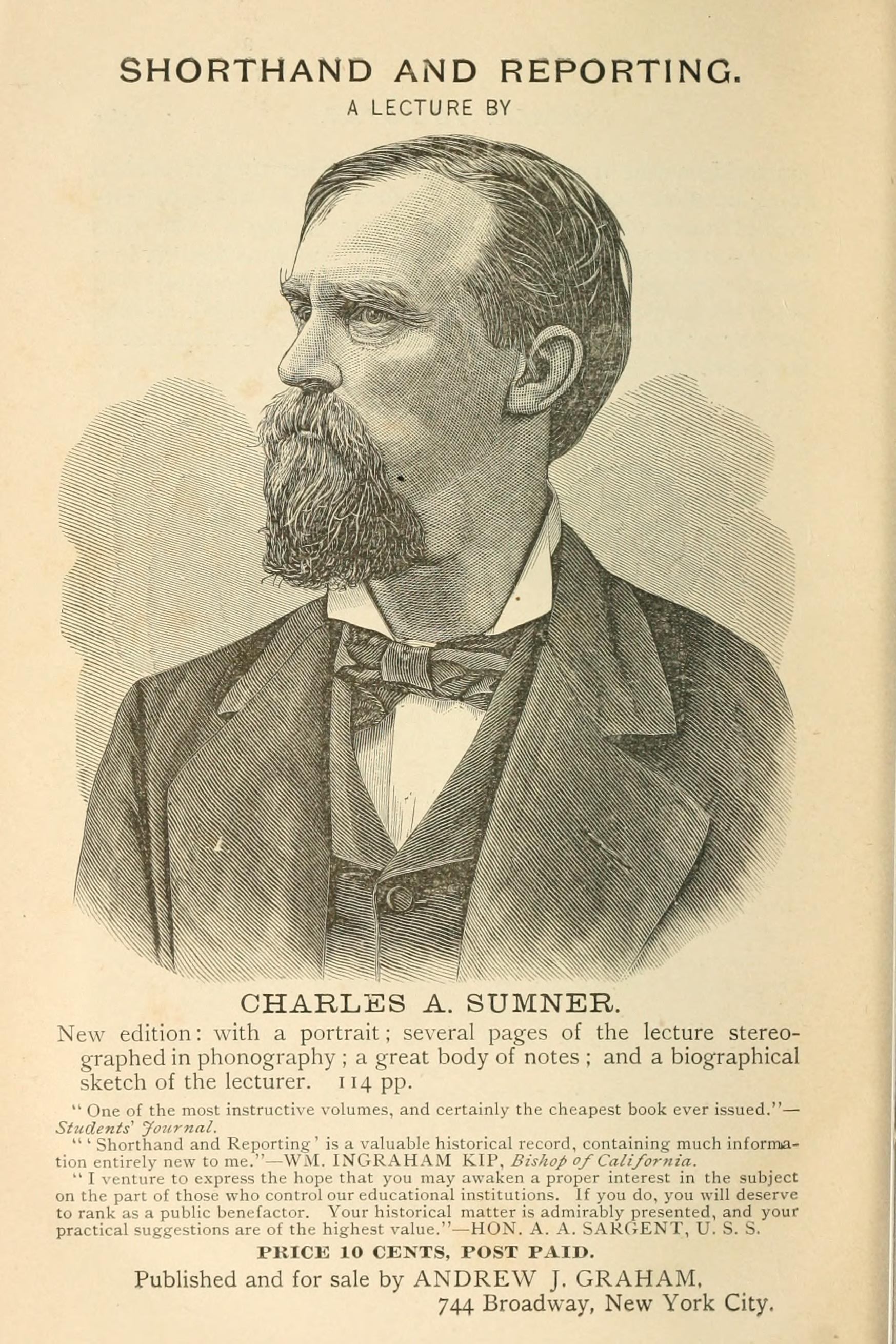
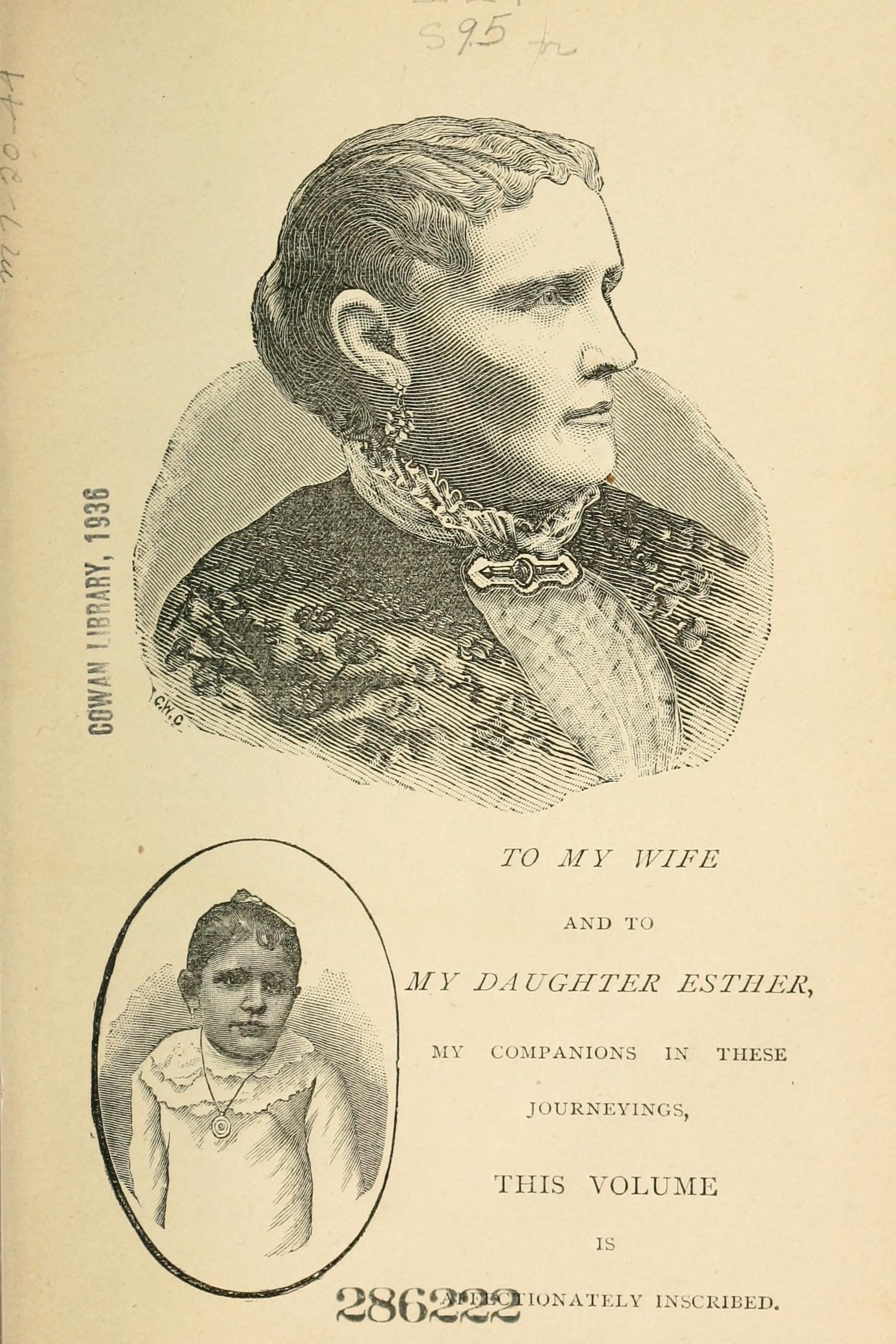
Engravings of Sumner, his wife and daughter by A. L. Rawson, 1886

Sumner moved to California in 1856 and settled in San Francisco where he reported for the legislature from 1857 to 1861. Between the legislative sessions he was engaged in the state and county courts, in law-reporting, and general editorial duties. In 1860, he was involved in political campaigning for the Republican Party. He became editor of the Herald and Mirror in 1861. His opposition to the “Shafter” land bill succeeded in defeating it.

During the Civil War, Sumner was appointed captain and assistant quartermaster of the United States Volunteers on November 26, 1862, serving until his resignation on March 30, 1864. He was later commissioned as colonel of the 1st Nevada Infantry Battalion, but this unit never reached full regimental strength, and Sumner was not mustered into service.

Sumner moved to Virginia City, Nevada, where he served as member of the Nevada State Senate from 1864 to 1868 and served as president pro tempore for the 1867 session. During this time, he was twice an unsuccessful candidate for U.S. Representative.

Sumner returned to San Francisco in 1868 and became editor of the Herald where he advocated a government postal telegraph. He was appointed official note-taker of the city, and in 1875 and 1880 official reporter of the supreme court.

=== U.S. Representative ===
After an unsuccessful attempt in 1879, Sumner was elected as a Democrat to the Forty-eighth Congress (March 4, 1883 – March 3, 1885). There he opposed the Pacific railroads, and introduced a postal telegraph bill. He was an unsuccessful candidate for reelection in 1884.

== Later life and death ==
Sumner c. 1903

Sumner later resumed the practice of law. Trinity gave him the degree of A. M. in 1887. He died in San Francisco, California, on January 31, 1903, and was interred in the George H. Thomas Post plot at the Presidio.

== Publications ==
- Shorthand and Reporting (New York, 1882)
- Golden Gate Sketches (1884)
- Travel in Southern Europe (1885)
- Sumners' Poems (with his brother, Samuel B. Summer, 1887)

== Sources ==
- United States Congress. "Charles A. Sumner (id: S001069)". Biographical Directory of the United States Congress.
- Wilson, J. G.; Fiske, J., eds. (1900). "Sumner, Charles Allen" . Appletons' Cyclopædia of American Biography. New York: D. Appleton.

U.S. House of Representatives
Preceded by District inactive	Member of the U.S. House of Representatives from California's at-large congressional district March 4, 1883 - March 3, 1885	Succeeded by District inactive
