= John R. Glascock =

American politician

John Glascock
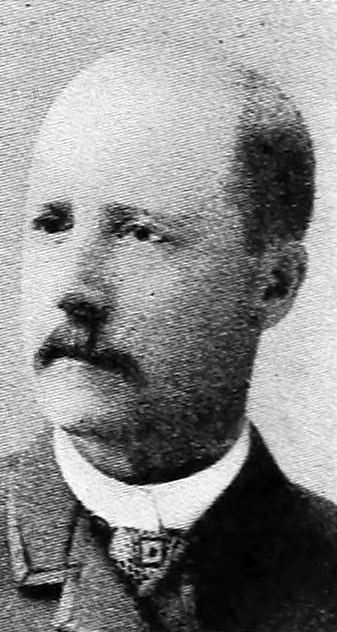

27th Mayor of Oakland
- In office March 11, 1889 – March 9, 1891
- Preceded by: Charles D. Pierce
- Succeeded by: Melvin C. Chapman

Member of the U.S. House of Representatives from California's at-large district
- In office March 4, 1883 – March 3, 1885
- Preceded by: Constituency established
- Succeeded by: Constituency abolished

Personal details
- Born: August 25, 1845 Panola County, Mississippi, U.S.
- Died: November 10, 1913 (aged 68) Woodside, California, U.S.
- Party: Democratic
- Other political affiliations: Workingmen's (1880)
- Education: University of California at Berkeley; University of Virginia at Charlottesville

John Raglan Glascock (August 25, 1845 – November 10, 1913) was an American lawyer and politician who served one term as a U.S. representative from California from 1883 to 1885, then as mayor of Oakland from 1889 to 1891.

== Biography ==
Born in Panola County, Mississippi, Glascock moved to California in 1856 with his parents, who settled in San Francisco. He attended the public schools and graduated from the University of California at Berkeley in 1865. He studied law at the University of Virginia at Charlottesville. He was admitted to the bar by the supreme court of California in 1868 and commenced practice in Oakland, California. He was admitted to practice before the Supreme Court of the United States in 1882. He served as district attorney of Alameda County, California from 1875 to 1877.

=== Congress ===
Glascock was an unsuccessful Democratic and Workingmen's Party candidate for Congress in 1880. In 1882, he was elected as a Democrat to the Forty-eighth Congress (March 4, 1883 – March 3, 1885). He was an unsuccessful candidate for reelection in 1884 to the Forty-ninth Congress. He served as mayor of Oakland, California from 1887 to 1890.

=== Later career and death ===
He resumed the practice of law in Oakland. He died at his country home in Woodside, California, November 10, 1913. He was interred in Mountain View Cemetery, Oakland, California.

U.S. House of Representatives
Preceded by District inactive	Member of the U.S. House of Representatives from California's at-large congressional district March 4, 1883 - March 3, 1885	Succeeded by District inactive
