= List of United States representatives from California =

This is a list of United States representatives from the state of California.

For chronological tables of members of both houses of the United States Congress from the state, see California's congressional delegations.

== Current members ==
As of August 18, 2026, California is represented by the following elected officials, 43 Democrats and 8 Republicans, and 1 independent.

- 1st district: James Gallagher (R), since 2026
- 2nd district: Jared Huffman (D), since 2013
- 3rd district: Kevin Kiley (I), since 2026
- 4th district: Mike Thompson (D), since 1999
- 5th district: Tom McClintock (R), since 2009
- 6th district: Ami Bera (D), since 2013
- 7th district: Doris Matsui (D), since 2005
- 8th district: John Garamendi (D), since 2009
- 9th district: Josh Harder (D), since 2019
- 10th district: Mark DeSaulnier (D), since 2015
- 11th district: Nancy Pelosi (D), since 1987
- 12th district: Lateefah Simon (D), since 2025
- 13th district: Adam Gray (D), since 2025
- 14th district: Aisha Wahab (D), since 2026
- 15th district: Kevin Mullin (D), since 2023
- 16th district: Sam Liccardo (D), since 2025
- 17th district: Ro Khanna (D), since 2017
- 18th district: Zoe Lofgren (D), since 1995
- 19th district: Jimmy Panetta (D), since 2017
- 20th district: Vince Fong (R), since 2024
- 21st district: Jim Costa (D), since 2005
- 22nd district: David Valadao (R), since 2021
- 23rd district: Jay Obernolte (R), since 2021
- 24th district: Salud Carbajal (D), since 2017
- 25th district: Raul Ruiz (D), since 2013
- 26th district: Julia Brownley (D), since 2013
- 27th district: George T. Whitesides (D), since 2025
- 28th district: Judy Chu (D), since 2009
- 29th district: Luz Rivas (D), since 2025
- 30th district: Laura Friedman (D), since 2025
- 31st district: Gil Cisneros (D), since 2025
- 32nd district: Brad Sherman (D), since 1997
- 33rd district: Pete Aguilar (D), since 2015
- 34th district: Jimmy Gomez (D), since 2017
- 35th district: Norma Torres (D), since 2015
- 36th district: Ted Lieu (D), since 2015
- 37th district: Sydney Kamlager (D), since 2023
- 38th district: Linda Sánchez (D), since 2003
- 39th district: Mark Takano (D), since 2013
- 40th district: Young Kim (R), since 2021
- 41st district: Ken Calvert (R), since 1993
- 42nd district: Robert Garcia (D), since 2023
- 43rd district: Maxine Waters (D), since 1991
- 44th district: Nanette Barragán (D), since 2017
- 45th district: Derek Tran (D), since 2025
- 46th district: Lou Correa (D), since 2017
- 47th district: Dave Min (D), since 2025
- 48th district: Darrell Issa (R), since 2021
- 49th district: Mike Levin (D), since 2019
- 50th district: Scott Peters (D), since 2013
- 51st district: Sara Jacobs (D), since 2021
- 52nd district: Juan Vargas (D), since 2013

== List of members ==
Representative	Party	District	Years	District home	Electoral history
Pete Aguilar	Democratic	31st	January 3, 2015 – January 3, 2023	San Bernardino	Elected in 2014. Redistricted to the 33rd district.
Pete Aguilar	Democratic	33rd	January 3, 2023 – present	San Bernardino	Redistricted from the 31st district and re-elected in 2022. Incumbent.
John J. Allen Jr.	Republican	7th	January 3, 1947 – January 3, 1959	Oakland	Elected in 1946. Lost re-election to Cohelan.
Glenn M. Anderson	Democratic	17th	January 3, 1969 – January 3, 1973	Hawthorne	Elected in 1968. Redistricted to the 35th district.
Glenn M. Anderson	Democratic	35th	January 3, 1973 – January 3, 1975	Hawthorne	Redistricted from the 17th district and re-elected in 1972. Redistricted to the 32nd district.
Glenn M. Anderson	Democratic	32nd	January 3, 1975 – January 3, 1993	Hawthorne	Redistricted from the 35th district and re-elected in 1974. Retired.
Jack Z. Anderson	Republican	8th	January 3, 1939 – January 3, 1953	San Juan Bautista	Elected in 1938. Retired.
Samuel Beach Axtell	Democratic	1st	March 4, 1867 – March 3, 1871	San Francisco	Elected in 1867. Retired.
Joe Baca	Democratic	42nd	November 16, 1999 – January 3, 2003	Rialto	Elected to finish George Brown Jr.'s term. Redistricted to the 43rd district.
Joe Baca	Democratic	43rd	January 3, 2003 – January 3, 2013	Rialto	Redistricted from the 42nd district and re-elected in 2002. Redistricted to the 35th district and lost re-election to Negrete McLeod.
Robert Badham	Republican	40th	January 3, 1977 – January 3, 1989	Newport Beach	Elected in 1976. Retired.
William P. Baker	Republican	10th	January 3, 1993 – January 3, 1997	Danville	Elected in 1992. Lost re-election to Tauscher.
John F. Baldwin Jr.	Republican	6th	January 3, 1955 – January 3, 1963	Martinez	Elected in 1954. Redistricted to the 14th district.
John F. Baldwin Jr.	Republican	14th	January 3, 1963 – March 9, 1966	Martinez	Redistricted from the 6th district and re-elected in 1962. Died.
Henry E. Barbour	Republican	7th	March 4, 1919 – March 3, 1933	Fresno	Elected in 1918. Redistricted to the 9th district and lost re-election to Church.
John All Barham	Republican	1st	March 4, 1895 – March 3, 1901	Santa Rosa	Elected in 1894. Retired.
Charles A. Barlow	Populist	6th	March 4, 1897 – March 3, 1899	San Luis Obispo	Elected in 1896. Retired
Nanette Barragán	Democratic	44th	January 3, 2017 – present	Hermosa Beach	Elected in 2016. Incumbent.
Karen Bass	Democratic	33rd	January 3, 2011 – January 3, 2013	Los Angeles	Elected in 2010. Redistricted to the 37th district.
Karen Bass	Democratic	37th	January 3, 2013 – December 9, 2022	Los Angeles	Redistricted from the 33rd district and re-elected in 2012. Retired to run for mayor of Los Angeles, and resigned to take office.
Jim Bates	Democratic	44th	January 3, 1983 – January 3, 1991	San Diego	Elected in 1982. Redistricted to the 50th district and lost renomination to Filner.
Xavier Becerra	Democratic	30th	January 3, 1993 – January 3, 2003	Los Angeles	Elected in 1992. Redistricted to the 31st district.
Xavier Becerra	Democratic	31st	January 3, 2003 – January 3, 2013	Los Angeles	Redistricted from the 30th district and re-elected in 2002. Redistricted to the 34th district.
Xavier Becerra	Democratic	34th	January 3, 2013 – January 24, 2017	Los Angeles	Redistricted from the 31st district and re-elected in 2012. Resigned to become California Attorney General.
Anthony C. Beilenson	Democratic	23rd	January 3, 1977 – January 3, 1993	Beverly Hills	Elected in 1976. Redistricted to the 24th district.
Anthony C. Beilenson	Democratic	24th	January 3, 1993 – January 3, 1997	Beverly Hills	Redistricted from the 23rd district and re-elected in 1992. Retired.
Alphonzo E. Bell Jr.	Republican	16th	January 3, 1961 – January 3, 1963	Beverly Hills	Elected in 1960. Redistricted to the 28th district.
Alphonzo E. Bell Jr.	Republican	28th	January 3, 1963 – January 3, 1975	Beverly Hills	Redistricted from the 16th district and re-elected in 1962. Redistricted to the 27th district.
Alphonzo E. Bell Jr.	Republican	27th	January 3, 1975 – January 3, 1977	Beverly Hills	Redistricted from the 18th district and re-elected in 1974. Retired to run for U.S. Senator.
Charles W. Bell	Progressive Republican	9th	March 4, 1913 – March 3, 1915	Pasadena	Elected in 1912. Lost re-election to Randall.
Theodore A. Bell	Democratic	2nd	March 4, 1903 – March 3, 1905	San Francisco	Elected in 1902. Lost re-election to McKinlay.
Henry S. Benedict	Republican	10th	November 7, 1916 – March 3, 1917	Los Angeles	Elected to finish William Stephens's term. Nominated by Progressive Party in 1916, but withdrew.
Ami Bera	Democratic	7th	January 3, 2013 – January 3, 2023	Elk Grove	Elected in 2012. Redistricted to the 6th district.
Ami Bera	Democratic	6th	January 3, 2023 – present	Elk Grove	Redistricted from the 7th district and re-elected in 2022. Incumbent.
Howard Berman	Democratic	26th	January 3, 1983 – January 3, 2003	North Hollywood	Elected in 1982. Redistricted to the 28th district.
Howard Berman	Democratic	28th	January 3, 2003 – January 3, 2013	North Hollywood	Redistricted from the 26th district and re-elected in 2002. Redistricted to the 30th district and lost re-election to Sherman.
Campbell Polson Berry	Democratic	3rd	March 4, 1879 – March 3, 1883	Wheatland	Elected in 1879. Retired
John Bidwell	Republican	3rd	March 4, 1865 – March 3, 1867	Chico	Elected in 1864. Retired to run for governor.
Marion Biggs	Democratic	2nd	March 4, 1887 – March 3, 1891	Gridley	Elected in 1886. Retired.
Brian Bilbray	Republican	49th	January 3, 1995 – January 3, 2001	Rancho Santa Fe	Elected in 1994. Lost re-election to S. Davis.
Brian Bilbray	Republican	50th	June 13, 2006 – January 3, 2013	Rancho Santa Fe	Elected to finish Cunningham's term. Redistricted to the 52nd district and lost re-election to Peters.
Sonny Bono	Republican	44th	January 3, 1995 – January 5, 1998	Palm Springs	Elected in 1994. Died.
Mary Bono Mack	Republican	44th	April 7, 1998 – January 3, 2003	Palm Springs	Elected to finish the term of her husband, Sonny Bono. Redistricted to the 45th district.
Mary Bono Mack	Republican	45th	January 3, 2003 – January 3, 2013	Palm Springs	Redistricted from the 44th district and re-elected in 2002. Redistricted to the 36th district and lost re-election to Ruiz.
Douglas Bosco	Democratic	1st	January 3, 1983 – January 3, 1991	San Rafael	Elected in 1982. Lost re-election to Riggs.
William W. Bowers	Republican	6th	March 4, 1891 – March 3, 1893	San Diego	Elected in 1890. Redistricted to the 7th district.
William W. Bowers	Republican	7th	March 4, 1893 – March 3, 1897	San Diego	Redistricted from the 44th district and re-elected in 1892. Lost re-election to Castle.
Barbara Boxer	Democratic	6th	January 3, 1983 – January 3, 1993	Greenbrae	Elected in 1982. Retired to run for U.S. Senator.
Willis W. Bradley	Republican	18th	January 3, 1947 – January 3, 1949	Long Beach	Elected in 1946. Lost re-election to Doyle.
Ernest K. Bramblett	Republican	11th	January 3, 1947 – January 3, 1953	Pacific Grove	Elected in 1946. Redistricted to the 13th district.
Ernest K. Bramblett	Republican	13th	January 3, 1953 – January 3, 1955	Pacific Grove	Redistricted from the 11th district and re-elected in 1952. Retired.
George Brown Jr.	Democratic	29th	January 3, 1963 – January 3, 1971	Monterey Park	Elected in 1962. Retired to run for U.S. Senator.
George Brown Jr.	Democratic	38th	January 3, 1973 – January 3, 1975	Monterey Park	Elected in 1972. Redistricted to the 36th district.
George Brown Jr.	Democratic	36th	January 3, 1975 – January 3, 1993	Monterey Park	Redistricted from the 38th district and re-elected in 1974. Redistricted to the 42nd district.
George Brown Jr.	Democratic	42nd	January 3, 1993 – July 15, 1999	Monterey Park	Redistricted from the 36th district and re-elected in 1992. Died.
Julia Brownley	Democratic	26th	January 3, 2013 – present	Westlake Village	Elected in 2012. Incumbent.
Frank H. Buck	Democratic	3rd	March 4, 1933 – September 17, 1942	San Francisco	Elected in 1932. Died.
James Budd	Democratic	2nd	March 4, 1883 – March 3, 1885	Stockton	Elected in 1882. Retired.
John Chilton Burch	Democratic	At-large	March 4, 1859 – March 3, 1861	San Francisco	Elected in 1859. Retired.
Clair Burgener	Republican	42nd	January 3, 1973 – January 3, 1975	San Diego	Elected in 1972. Redistricted to the 43rd district.
Clair Burgener	Republican	43rd	January 3, 1975 – January 3, 1983	San Diego	Redistricted from the 42nd district and re-elected in 1974. Retired.
John H. Burke	Democratic	18th	March 4, 1933 – January 3, 1935	Long Beach	Elected in 1932. Retired
Yvonne Brathwaite Burke	Democratic	37th	January 3, 1973 – January 3, 1975	Los Angeles	Elected in 1972. Redistricted to the 37th district.
Yvonne Brathwaite Burke	Democratic	28th	January 3, 1975 – January 3, 1979	Los Angeles	Redistricted from the 37th district and re-elected in 1974. Retired to run for Attorney General.
Everett G. Burkhalter	Democratic	27th	January 3, 1963 – January 3, 1965	Los Angeles	Elected in 1962. Retired.
George Burnham	Republican	20th	March 4, 1933 – January 3, 1937	San Diego	Elected in 1932. Retired.
John Burton	Democratic	6th	June 4, 1974 – January 3, 1975	San Francisco	Elected to finish Mailliard's term. Redistricted to the 5th district.
John Burton	Democratic	5th	January 3, 1975 – January 3, 1983	San Francisco	Redistricted from the 6th district and re-elected in 1974. Retired.
Phillip Burton	Democratic	5th	February 18, 1964 – January 3, 1975	San Francisco	Elected to finish Shelley's term. Redistricted to the 6th district.
Phillip Burton	Democratic	6th	January 3, 1975 – January 3, 1983	San Francisco	Redistricted from the 5th district and re-elected in 1974. Redistricted to the 5th district.
Phillip Burton	Democratic	5th	January 3, 1983 – April 10, 1983	San Francisco	Redistricted from the 6th district and re-elected in 1982. Died.
Sala Burton	Democratic	5th	June 21, 1983 – February 1, 1987	San Francisco	Elected to finish the term of her husband, Phillip Burton. Died.
Ken Calvert	Republican	43rd	January 3, 1993 – January 3, 2003	Corona	Elected in 1992. Redistricted to the 44th district.
Ken Calvert	Republican	44th	January 3, 2003 – January 3, 2013	Corona	Redistricted from the 43rd district and re-elected in 2002. Redistricted to the 42nd district.
Ken Calvert	Republican	42nd	January 3, 2013 – January 3, 2023	Corona	Redistricted from the 44th district and re-elected in 2012. Redistricted to the 41st district.
Ken Calvert	Republican	41st	January 3, 2023 – present	Corona	Redistricted from the 42nd district and re-elected in 2022. Incumbent.
Ronald B. Cameron	Democratic	25th	January 3, 1963 – January 3, 1967	Whittier	Elected in 1962. Lost re-election to Wiggins.
Anthony Caminetti	Democratic	2nd	March 4, 1891 – March 3, 1895	Jackson	Elected in 1890. Lost re-election to G. L. Johnson.
John B. T. Campbell III	Republican	48th	December 7, 2005 – January 3, 2013	Newport Beach	Elected to finish Christopher Cox's term. Redistricted to the 45th district.
John B. T. Campbell III	Republican	45th	January 3, 2013 – January 3, 2015	Newport Beach	Redistricted from the 48th district and re-elected in 2012. Retired.
Tom Campbell	Republican	12th	January 3, 1989 – January 3, 1993	Campbell	Elected in 1988. Retired to run for U.S. Senator.
Tom Campbell	Republican	15th	January 12, 1995 – January 3, 2001	Campbell	Elected to finish Mineta's term. Retired to run for U.S. Senator.
Marion Cannon	Populist	6th	March 4, 1893 – March 3, 1895	Ventura	Elected in 1892. Retired.
Lois Capps	Democratic	22nd	March 17, 1998 – January 3, 2003	Santa Barbara	Elected to finish the term of her husband, Walter Capps. Redistricted to the 23rd district.
Lois Capps	Democratic	23rd	January 3, 2003 – January 3, 2013	Santa Barbara	Redistricted from the 22nd district and re-elected in 2002. Redistricted to the 24th district.
Lois Capps	Democratic	24th	January 3, 2013 – January 3, 2017	Santa Barbara	Redistricted from the 23rd district and re-elected in 2012. Retired.
Walter Capps	Democratic	22nd	January 3, 1997 – October 28, 1997	Santa Barbara	Elected in 1996. Died.
Salud Carbajal	Democratic	24th	January 3, 2017 – present	Santa Barbara	Elected in 2016. Incumbent.
Tony Cardenas	Democratic	29th	January 3, 2013 – January 3, 2025	Pacoima	Elected in 2012. Retired.
Dennis Cardoza	Democratic	18th	January 3, 2003 – August 14, 2012	Atwater	Elected in 2002. Resigned.
Albert E. Carter	Republican	6th	March 4, 1925 – January 3, 1945	Oakland	Elected in 1924. Lost re-election to G. P. Miller.
Curtis H. Castle	Populist	7th	March 4, 1897 – March 3, 1899	Merced	Elected in 1896. Lost re-election to Needham.
Eugene A. Chappie	Republican	1st	January 3, 1981 – January 3, 1983	Chico	Elected in 1980. Redistricted to the 2nd district.
Eugene A. Chappie	Republican	2nd	January 3, 1983 – January 3, 1987	Chico	Redistricted from the 1st district and re-elected in 1982. Retired.
Judy Chu	Democratic	32nd	July 14, 2009 – January 3, 2013	Monterey Park	Elected to finish Solis's term. Redistricted to the 27th district.
Judy Chu	Democratic	27th	January 3, 2013 – January 3, 2023	Monterey Park	Redistricted from the 32nd district and re-elected in 2012. Redistricted to the 28th district.
Judy Chu	Democratic	28th	January 3, 2023 – present	Monterey Park	Redistricted from the 27th district and re-elected in 2022. Incumbent.
Denver S. Church	Democratic	7th	March 4, 1913 – March 3, 1919	Fresno	Elected in 1912. Retired.
Denver S. Church	Democratic	9th	March 4, 1933 – March 3, 1935	Fresno	Elected in 1932. Retired.
Gil Cisneros	Democratic	39th	January 3, 2019 – January 3, 2021	Yorba Linda	Elected in 2018. Lost re-election.
Gil Cisneros	Democratic	31st	January 3, 2025 – present	Covina	Elected in 2024. Incumbent.
Donald H. Clausen	Republican	1st	January 22, 1963 – January 3, 1975	Crescent City	Elected to finish Clement W. Miller's term. Redistricted to the 2nd district.
Donald H. Clausen	Republican	2nd	January 3, 1975 – January 3, 1983	Crescent City	Redistricted from the 1st district and re-elected in 1974. Redistricted to the 1st district and lost re-election to Bosco.
Del M. Clawson	Republican	23rd	January 3, 1963 – January 3, 1975	Compton	Elected in 1962. Redistricted to the 33rd district.
Del M. Clawson	Republican	33rd	January 3, 1975 – December 31, 1978	Compton	Redistricted from the 23rd district and re-elected in 1974. Retired and resigned early.
Charles Clayton	Republican	1st	March 4, 1873 – March 3, 1875	Santa Clara	Elected in 1872. Retired.
Thomas J. Clunie	Democratic	5th	March 4, 1889 – March 3, 1891	Sacramento	Elected in 1888. Lost re-election to Loud.
Tony Coelho	Democratic	15th	January 3, 1979 – June 15, 1989	Dos Palos	Elected in 1978. Resigned.
John M. Coghlan	Republican	3rd	March 4, 1871 – March 3, 1873	Suisun City	Elected in 1871. Lost re-election to Luttrell.
Jeffery Cohelan	Democratic	7th	January 3, 1959 – January 3, 1971	Berkeley	Elected in 1958. Lost renomination to Dellums.
Charles J. Colden	Democratic	17th	January 3, 1933 – April 15, 1938	San Pedro	Elected in 1932. Died.
Cornelius Cole	Union Republican	At-large	March 4, 1863 – March 3, 1865	Santa Cruz	Elected in 1863. Retired to run for U.S. Senator.
Sam L. Collins	Republican	19th	March 4, 1933 – January 3, 1937	Fullerton	Elected in 1932. Lost renomination to Sheppard.
Gary Condit	Democratic	15th	January 3, 1989 – January 3, 1993	Ceres	Elected in 1988. Redistricted to the 18th district.
Gary Condit	Democratic	18th	January 3, 1993 – January 3, 2003	Ceres	Redistricted from the 15th district and re-elected in 1992. Lost renomination to Cardoza.
Robert Condon	Democratic	6th	January 3, 1953 – January 3, 1955	Martinez	Elected in 1952. Lost re-election to Baldwin Jr.
Connie Conway	Republican	22nd	June 7, 2022 – January 3, 2023	Tulare	Elected to finish Nunes's term. Retired.
Paul Cook	Republican	8th	January 3, 2013 – December 7, 2020	Apple Valley	Elected in 2012. Retired to run for San Bernardino County Board of Supervisors and resigned to take office.
Frank Coombs	Republican	1st	March 4, 1901 – March 3, 1903	Napa	Elected in 1900. Redistricted to the 2nd district and lost re-election to Bell.
James C. Corman	Democratic	22nd	January 3, 1961 – January 3, 1975	Los Angeles	Elected in 1960. Redistricted to the 21st district.
James C. Corman	Democratic	21st	January 3, 1975 – January 3, 1981	Los Angeles	Redistricted from the 22nd district and re-elected in 1974. Lost re-election to Fiedler.
Lou Correa	Democratic	46th	January 3, 2017 – present	Santa Ana	Elected in 2016. Incumbent.
Jim Costa	Democratic	20th	January 3, 2005 – January 3, 2013	Fresno	Elected in 2004. Redistricted to the 16th district.
Jim Costa	Democratic	16th	January 3, 2013 – January 3, 2023	Fresno	Redistricted from the 20th district and re-elected in 2012. Redistricted to the 21st district.
Jim Costa	Democratic	21st	January 3, 2023 – present	Fresno	Redistricted to the 16th district and re-elected in 2022. Incumbent.
John M. Costello	Democratic	15th	January 3, 1935 – January 3, 1945	Los Angeles	Elected in 1934. Lost renomination to Hal Styles.
Christopher Cox	Republican	40th	January 3, 1989 – January 3, 1993	Newport Beach	Elected in 1988. Redistricted to the 47th district.
Christopher Cox	Republican	47th	January 3, 1993 – January 3, 2003	Newport Beach	Redistricted from the 40th district and re-elected in 1992. Redistricted to the 48th district.
Christopher Cox	Republican	48th	January 3, 2003 – August 2, 2005	Newport Beach	Redistricted from the 47th district and re-elected in 2002. Resigned to become Chair of the Securities and Exchange Commission.
TJ Cox	Democratic	21st	January 3, 2019 – January 3, 2021	Fresno	Elected in 2018. Lost re-election to Valadao.
Joe Crail	Republican	10th	March 4, 1927 – March 3, 1933	Los Angeles	Elected in 1926. Retired to run for U.S. Senator.
Duke Cunningham	Republican	44th	January 3, 1991 – January 3, 1993	Del Mar	Elected in 1990. Redistricted to the 51st district.
Duke Cunningham	Republican	51st	January 3, 1993 – January 3, 2003	Del Mar	Redistricted from the 44th district and re-elected in 1992. Redistricted to the 50th district.
Duke Cunningham	Republican	50th	January 3, 2003 – December 1, 2005	Del Mar	Redistricted from the 51st district and re-elected in 2002. Resigned.
Charles F. Curry	Republican	3rd	March 4, 1913 – October 1, 1930	Sacramento	Elected in 1912. Died.
Charles F. Curry Jr.	Republican	3rd	March 4, 1931 – March 3, 1933	Sacramento	Elected in 1930. Lost re-election to Buck.
John T. Cutting	Republican	4th	March 4, 1891 – March 3, 1893	San Francisco	Elected in 1890. Retired.
Milton J. Daniels	Republican	8th	March 4, 1903 – March 3, 1905	Riverside	Elected in 1902. Retired.
George E. Danielson	Democratic	29th	January 3, 1971 – January 3, 1975	Los Angeles	Elected in 1970. Redistricted to the 30th district.
George E. Danielson	Democratic	30th	January 3, 1975 – March 9, 1982	Los Angeles	Redistricted from the 29th district and re-elected in 1974. Resigned to serve on California Courts of Appeal.
William E. Dannemeyer	Republican	39th	January 3, 1979 – January 3, 1993	Fullerton	Elected in 1978. Retired to run for U.S. Senator.
Horace Davis	Republican	1st	March 4, 1877 – March 3, 1881	San Francisco	Elected in 1876. Lost re-election to Rosecrans.
Susan Davis	Democratic	49th	January 3, 2001 – January 3, 2003	San Diego	Elected in 2000. Redistricted to the 53rd district.
Susan Davis	Democratic	53rd	January 3, 2003 – January 3, 2021	San Diego	Redistricted from the 49th district and re-elected in 2002. Retired.
John J. De Haven	Republican	1st	March 4, 1889 – October 1, 1890	Eureka	Elected in 1888. Resigned to serve on Supreme Court of California.
Marion De Vries	Democratic	2nd	March 4, 1897 – June 9, 1900	Stockton	Elected in 1896. Resigned to serve on Board of General Appraisers.
Ron Dellums	Democratic	7th	January 3, 1971 – January 3, 1975	Oakland	Elected in 1970. Redistricted to the 8th district.
Ron Dellums	Democratic	8th	January 3, 1975 – January 3, 1993	Oakland	Redistricted from the 7th district and re-elected in 1974. Redistricted to the 9th district.
Ron Dellums	Democratic	9th	January 3, 1993 – February 6, 1998	Oakland	Redistricted from the 8th district and re-elected in 1992. Resigned.
Jeff Denham	Republican	19th	January 3, 2011 – January 3, 2013	Merced	Elected in 2010. Redistricted to the 10th district.
Jeff Denham	Republican	10th	January 3, 2013 – January 3, 2019	Merced	Redistricted from the 19th district and re-elected in 2012. Lost re-election to Harder.
James W. Denver	Democratic	At-large	March 4, 1855 – March 3, 1857	San Francisco	Elected in 1854. Retired.
Mark DeSaulnier	Democratic	11th	January 3, 2015 – January 3, 2023	Concord	Elected in 2014. Redistricted to the 10th district.
Mark DeSaulnier	Democratic	10th	January 3, 2023 – present	Concord	Redistricted from the 11th district and re-elected in 2022. Incumbent.
Julian C. Dixon	Democratic	28th	January 3, 1979 – January 3, 1993	Los Angeles	Elected in 1978. Redistricted to the 32nd district.
Julian C. Dixon	Democratic	32nd	January 3, 1993 – December 8, 2000	Los Angeles	Redistricted from the 28th district and re-elected in 1992. Re-elected in 2000 but died before term began.
John F. Dockweiler	Democratic	16th	March 4, 1933 – January 3, 1939	Los Angeles	Elected in 1932. Retired to run for governor.
Calvin M. Dooley	Democratic	17th	January 3, 1991 – January 3, 1993	Hanford	Elected in 1990. Redistricted to the 20th district.
Calvin M. Dooley	Democratic	20th	January 3, 1993 – January 3, 2005	Hanford	Redistricted from 17th district and re-elected in 1992. Retired.
John Doolittle	Republican	14th	January 3, 1991 – January 3, 1993	Roseville	Elected in 1990. Redistricted to the 4th district.
John Doolittle	Republican	4th	January 3, 1993 – January 3, 2009	Roseville	Redistricted from 14th district and re-elected in 1992. Retired.
Bob Dornan	Republican	27th	January 3, 1977 – January 3, 1983	Los Angeles	Elected in 1976. Retired to run for U.S. Senator.
Bob Dornan	Republican	38th	January 3, 1985 – January 3, 1993	Garden Grove	Elected in 1984. Redistricted to the 46th district.
Bob Dornan	Republican	46th	January 3, 1993 – January 3, 1997	Garden Grove	Redistricted from the 38th district and re-elected in 1992. Lost re-election to Sanchez.
Helen Gahagan Douglas	Democratic	14th	January 3, 1945 – January 3, 1951	Los Angeles	Elected in 1944. Retired to run for U.S. Senator.
Clyde Doyle	Democratic	18th	January 3, 1945 – January 3, 1947	Long Beach	Elected in 1944. Lost re-election to Bradley.
Clyde Doyle	Democratic	18th	January 3, 1949 – January 3, 1953	Long Beach	Elected in 1946. Redistricted to the 23rd district.
Clyde Doyle	Democratic	23rd	January 3, 1953 – March 14, 1963	Long Beach	Redistricted from the 18th district and re-elected in 1952. Died.
David Dreier	Republican	35th	January 3, 1981 – January 3, 1983	San Dimas	Elected in 1980. Redistricted to the 33rd district.
David Dreier	Republican	33rd	January 3, 1983 – January 3, 1993	San Dimas	Redistricted from the 35th district and re-elected in 1982. Redistricted to the 28th district.
David Dreier	Republican	28th	January 3, 1993 – January 3, 2003	San Dimas	Redistricted from the 33rd district and re-elected in 1992. Redistricted to the 26th district.
David Dreier	Republican	26th	January 3, 2003 – January 3, 2013	San Dimas	Redistricted from the 28th district and re-elected in 2002. Retired.
John Duarte	Republican	13th	January 3, 2023 – January 3, 2025	Hughson	Elected in 2022. Lost re-election to Gray.
Kenneth W. Dyal	Democratic	33rd	January 3, 1965 – January 3, 1967	San Bernardino	Elected in 1964. Lost re-election to Pettis.
Mervyn M. Dymally	Democratic	31st	January 3, 1981 – January 3, 1993	Los Angeles	Elected in 1980. Retired.
Thomas M. Eaton	Republican	18th	January 3, 1939 – September 16, 1939	Long Beach	Elected in 1938. Died.
Don Edwards	Democratic	9th	January 3, 1963 – January 3, 1975	San Jose	Elected in 1962. Redistricted to the 10th district.
Don Edwards	Democratic	10th	January 3, 1975 – January 3, 1993	San Jose	Redistricted from the 9th district and re-elected in 1974. Redistricted to the 16th district.
Don Edwards	Democratic	16th	January 3, 1993 – January 3, 1995	San Jose	Redistricted from the 10th district and re-elected in 1992. Retired.
Alfred J. Elliott	Democratic	10th	May 4, 1937 – January 3, 1949	Tulare	Elected to finish Henry E. Stubbs's term. Retired.
John A. Elston	Progressive	6th	March 4, 1913 – March 3, 1915	Berkeley	Elected in 1912. Changed parties.
John A. Elston	Republican	6th	March 4, 1915 – December 15, 1921	Berkeley	Re-elected in 1914 as a Republican. Died.
Ralph R. Eltse	Republican	7th	March 4, 1933 – January 3, 1935	Berkeley	Elected in 1932. Lost re-election to Tolan.
Clair Engle	Democratic	2nd	August 31, 1943 – January 3, 1959	Corning	Elected to finish Harry Lane Englebright's term. Retired to run for U.S. Senator.
William F. Englebright	Republican	1st	November 6, 1906 – March 3, 1911	Nevada City	Elected to finish Gillett's term. Lost re-election to Raker.
Harry Lane Englebright	Republican	2nd	August 31, 1926 – May 13, 1943	Nevada City	Elected to finish Raker's term. Died.
Warren B. English	Democratic	3rd	April 4, 1894 – March 3, 1895	Oakland	Successfully contested Hilborn's election. Lost re-election to Hilborn.
Anna Eshoo	Democratic	14th	January 3, 1993 – January 3, 2013	Atherton	Elected in 1992. Redistricted to the 18th district.
Anna Eshoo	Democratic	18th	January 3, 2013 – January 3, 2023	Atherton	Redistricted from the 14th district and re-elected in 2012. Redistricted to the 16th district.
Anna Eshoo	Democratic	16th	January 3, 2023 – January 3, 2025	Atherton	Redistricted from the 18th district and re-elected in 2022. Retired.
William E. Evans	Republican	9th	March 4, 1927 – January 3, 1933	Glendale	Elected in 1926. Redistricted to the 11th district.
William E. Evans	Republican	11th	March 4, 1933 – January 3, 1935	Glendale	Redistricted from the 9th district and re-elected in 1932. Lost re-election to McGroarty.
Sam Farr	Democratic	17th	June 8, 1993 – January 3, 2013	Carmel	Elected to finish Panetta's term. Redistricted to the 20th district.
Sam Farr	Democratic	20th	January 3, 2013 – January 3, 2017	Carmel	Redistricted from the 17th district and re-elected in 2012. Retired.
Victor H. Fazio	Democratic	4th	January 3, 1979 – January 3, 1993	Sacramento	Elected in 1978. Redistricted to the 3rd district.
Victor H. Fazio	Democratic	3rd	January 3, 1993 – January 3, 1999	Sacramento	Redistricted from the 4th district and re-elected in 1992. Retired.
Charles N. Felton	Republican	5th	March 4, 1885 – March 3, 1889	San Francisco	Elected in 1884. Retired.
Bobbi Fiedler	Republican	21st	January 3, 1981 – January 3, 1987	Los Angeles	Elected in 1980. Retired to run for U.S. Senator.
Bob Filner	Democratic	50th	January 3, 1993 – January 3, 2003	San Diego	Elected in 1992. Redistricted to the 51st district.
Bob Filner	Democratic	51st	January 3, 2003 – December 3, 2012	San Diego	Redistricted from the 50th district and re-elected in 2002. Retired to run for mayor of San Diego and resigned to take office.
Lawrence J. Flaherty	Republican	5th	March 4, 1925 – June 13, 1926	San Francisco	Elected in 1924. Died.
Charles K. Fletcher	Republican	23rd	January 3, 1947 – January 3, 1949	San Diego	Elected in 1946. Lost re-election to McKinnon.
Vince Fong	Republican	20th	May 21, 2024 – present	Bakersfield	Elected to finish McCarthy's term. Incumbent.
Thomas F. Ford	Democratic	14th	March 4, 1933 – January 3, 1945	Los Angeles	Elected in 1932. Retired.
Leland M. Ford	Republican	16th	January 3, 1939 – January 3, 1943	Santa Monica	Elected in 1938. Lost re-election to Rogers Jr.
John D. Fredericks	Republican	10th	May 1, 1923 – March 3, 1927	Los Angeles	Elected to finish Osborne's term. Retired.
Arthur M. Free	Republican	8th	March 4, 1921 – March 3, 1933	San Jose	Elected in 1920. Lost re-election to McGrath.
Laura Friedman	Democratic	30th	January 3, 2025 – present	Glendale	Elected in 2024. Incumbent.
James Gallagher	Republican	1st	June 2, 2026 – present	Yuba City	Elected to finish LaMalfa's term. Incumbent.
Elton Gallegly	Republican	21st	January 3, 1987 – January 3, 1993	Simi Valley	Elected in 1986. Redistricted to the 23rd district.
Elton Gallegly	Republican	23rd	January 3, 1993 – January 3, 2003	Simi Valley	Redistricted from the 21st district and re-elected in 1992. Redistricted to the 24th district.
Elton Gallegly	Republican	24th	January 3, 2003 – January 3, 2013	Simi Valley	Redistricted from the 23rd district and re-elected in 2002. Retired.
John Garamendi	Democratic	10th	November 5, 2009 – January 3, 2013	Walnut Creek	Elected to finish Tauscher's term. Redistricted to the 3rd district.
John Garamendi	Democratic	3rd	January 3, 2013 – January 3, 2023	Walnut Creek	Redistricted from the 10th district and re-elected in 2012. Redistricted to the 8th district.
John Garamendi	Democratic	8th	January 3, 2023 – present	Walnut Creek	Redistricted from the 3rd district and re-elected in 2022. Incumbent.
Mike Garcia	Republican	25th	May 12, 2020 – January 3, 2023	Santa Clarita	Elected to finish Hill's term. Redistricted to the 27th district.
Mike Garcia	Republican	27th	January 3, 2023 – January 3, 2025	Santa Clarita	Redistricted from the 3rd district and re-elected in 2022. Lost re-election to Whitesides.
Robert Garcia	Democratic	42nd	January 3, 2023 – present	Long Beach	Elected in 2022. Incumbent.
Bertrand W. Gearhart	Republican	9th	January 3, 1935 – January 3, 1949	Fresno	Elected in 1934. Lost re-election to White.
Thomas J. Geary	Democratic	1st	December 9, 1890 – January 3, 1895	Santa Rosa	Elected to finish De Haven's term. Lost re-election to Barham.
Lee E. Geyer	Democratic	17th	January 3, 1939 – October 11, 1941	Gardena	Elected in 1938. Died.
Edward Gilbert	Democratic	At-large	September 11, 1850 – March 3, 1851	San Francisco	Elected in 1849. Retired.
James Gillett	Republican	1st	March 4, 1902 – November 4, 1906	Eureka	Elected in 1902. Retired to run for governor and resigned early.
John R. Glascock	Democratic	At-large	March 4, 1883 – March 3, 1885	Oakland	Elected in 1882. Redistricted to the 3rd district and lost re-election to McKenna.
Barry Goldwater Jr.	Republican	27th	April 29, 1969 – January 3, 1975	Burbank	Elected to finish Reinecke's term. Redistricted to the 20th district.
Barry Goldwater Jr.	Republican	20th	January 3, 1975 – January 3, 1983	Burbank	Redistricted from the 27th district and re-elected in 1974. Retired to run for U.S. Senator.
Jimmy Gomez	Democratic	34th	June 6, 2017 – present	Los Angeles	Elected to finish Becerra's term. Incumbent.
Adam Gray	Democratic	13th	January 3, 2025 – present	Merced	Elected in 2024. Incumbent.
Wayne R. Grisham	Republican	33rd	January 3, 1979 – January 3, 1983	La Mirada	Elected in 1978. Redistricted to the 33rd district and lost renomination to Dreier.
Charles S. Gubser	Republican	10th	January 3, 1953 – December 31, 1974	Gilroy	Elected in 1952. Retired and resigned early.
Harlan Hagen	Democratic	14th	January 3, 1953 – January 3, 1963	Hanford	Elected in 1952. Redistricted to the 18th district.
Harlan Hagen	Democratic	18th	January 3, 1963 – January 3, 1967	Hanford	Redistricted from the 14th district and re-elected in 1962. Lost re-election to Mathias.
Janice Hahn	Democratic	36th	July 12, 2011 – January 3, 2013	Los Angeles	Elected to finish Harman's term. Redistricted to the 44th district.
Janice Hahn	Democratic	44th	January 3, 2013 – December 4, 2016	Los Angeles	Redistricted from the 36th district and re-elected in 2012. Retired to run for Los Angeles County Board of Supervisors and resigned to take office.
Daniel Hamburg	Democratic	1st	January 3, 1993 – January 3, 1995	Ukiah	Elected in 1992. Lost re-election to Riggs.
Richard T. Hanna	Democratic	34th	January 3, 1963 – December 31, 1974	Fullerton	Elected in 1962. Retired and resigned early.
Mark W. Hannaford	Democratic	34th	January 3, 1975 – January 3, 1979	Lakewood	Elected in 1974. Lost re-election to Lungren.
Jane Harman	Democratic	36th	January 3, 1993 – January 3, 1999	Venice	Elected in 1992. Retired to run for Governor of California.
Jane Harman	Democratic	36th	January 3, 2001 – February 28, 2011	Venice	Elected in 2000. Resigned to become President of the Woodrow Wilson Center.
Josh Harder	Democratic	10th	January 3, 2019 – January 3, 2023	Turlock	Elected in 2018. Redistricted to the 9th district.
Josh Harder	Democratic	9th	January 3, 2023 – present	Turlock	Redistricted from the 10th district and re-elected in 2022. Incumbent.
Franck R. Havenner	Progressive	4th	January 3, 1937 – January 3, 1939	San Francisco	Elected in 1936. Changed parties.
Franck R. Havenner	Democratic	4th	January 3, 1939 – January 3, 1941	San Francisco	Re-elected in 1938 as a Democrat. Lost re-election to Rolph.
Franck R. Havenner	Democratic	4th	January 3, 1945 – January 3, 1953	San Francisco	Elected in 1944. Lost re-election to Mailliard.
Augustus Hawkins	Democratic	21st	January 3, 1963 – January 3, 1975	Los Angeles	Elected in 1962. Redistricted to the 29th district.
Augustus Hawkins	Democratic	29th	January 3, 1975 – January 3, 1991	Los Angeles	Redistricted from the 21st district and re-elected in 1974. Retired.
Everis A. Hayes	Republican	5th	March 4, 1905 – March 3, 1913	San Jose	Elected in 1904. Redistricted to the 8th district.
Everis A. Hayes	Republican	8th	March 4, 1913 – March 3, 1919	San Jose	Redistricted from the 5th district and re-elected in 1912. Lost re-election to Hersman.
Ned R. Healy	Democratic	13th	January 3, 1945 – January 3, 1947	Los Angeles	Elected in 1944. Lost re-election to Poulson.
Barclay Henley	Democratic	3rd	March 4, 1883 – March 3, 1885	Santa Rosa	Elected in 1882. Redistricted to the 1st district.
Barclay Henley	Democratic	1st	March 4, 1885 – March 3, 1887	Santa Rosa	Redistricted from the 5th district and re-elected in 1884. Retired.
Philemon T. Herbert	Democratic	At-large	March 4, 1855 – March 3, 1857	Mariposa	Elected in 1854. Retired.
Wally Herger	Republican	2nd	January 3, 1987 – January 3, 2013	Marysville	Elected in 1986. Retired.
Hugh S. Hersman	Democratic	8th	March 4, 1919 – March 3, 1921	Gilroy	Elected in 1918. Lost re-election to Free.
Edgar W. Hiestand	Republican	21st	January 3, 1953 – January 3, 1963	Altadena	Elected in 1952. Redistricted to the 27th district and lost re-election to Burkhalter.
William Higby	Republican	At-large	March 4, 1863 – March 3, 1865	Calaveras	Elected in 1863. Redistricted to the 2nd district.
William Higby	Republican	2nd	March 4, 1865 – March 3, 1869	Calaveras	Redistricted from the at-large district and re-elected in 1864. Lost renomination to Sargent.
Samuel G. Hilborn	Republican	3rd	December 5, 1892 – April 4, 1894	Oakland	Elected to finish McKenna's term. Lost election contest to English.
Samuel G. Hilborn	Republican	3rd	March 4, 1895 – March 3, 1899	Oakland	Elected in 1894. Lost renomination to Metcalf.
Katie Hill	Democratic	25th	January 3, 2019 – November 3, 2019	Santa Clarita	Elected in 2018. Resigned.
Patrick J. Hillings	Republican	12th	January 3, 1951 – January 3, 1953	Arcadia	Elected in 1950. Redistricted to the 25th district.
Patrick J. Hillings	Republican	25th	January 3, 1953 – January 3, 1959	Arcadia	Redistricted from the 12th district and re-elected in 1952. Retired to run for Attorney General.
Andrew J. Hinshaw	Republican	39th	January 3, 1973 – January 3, 1975	Mission Viejo	Elected in 1972. Redistricted to the 40th district.
Andrew J. Hinshaw	Republican	40th	January 3, 1975 – January 3, 1977	Mission Viejo	Redistricted from the 39th district and re-elected in 1974. Lost renomination to Badham.
John Carl Hinshaw	Republican	11th	January 3, 1939 – January 3, 1943	Pasadena	Elected in 1938. Redistricted to the 20th district.
John Carl Hinshaw	Republican	20th	January 3, 1943 – August 5, 1956	Pasadena	Redistricted from the 11th district and re-elected in 1942. Died.
John H. Hoeppel	Democratic	12th	March 4, 1933 – January 3, 1937	Arcadia	Elected in 1932. Lost renomination to Voorhis.
Chet Holifield	Democratic	19th	January 3, 1943 – December 31, 1974	Montebello	Elected in 1942. Retired and resigned early.
Joseph F. Holt	Republican	22nd	January 3, 1953 – January 3, 1961	Los Angeles	Elected in 1952. Retired
Mike Honda	Democratic	15th	January 3, 2001 – January 3, 2013	San Jose	Elected in 2000. Redistricted to the 17th district.
Mike Honda	Democratic	17th	January 3, 2013 – January 3, 2017	San Jose	Redistricted from the 15th district and re-elected in 2012. Lost re-election to Khanna.
Steve Horn	Republican	38th	January 3, 1993 – January 3, 2003	Long Beach	Elected in 1992. Retired.
Craig Hosmer	Republican	18th	January 3, 1953 – January 3, 1963	Long Beach	Elected in 1952. Redistricted to the 32nd district.
Craig Hosmer	Republican	32nd	January 1, 1963 – December 31, 1974	Long Beach	Redistricted from the 18th district and re-elected in 1962. Retired and resigned early.
Sherman Otis Houghton	Republican	1st	March 4, 1871 – March 3, 1873	San Jose	Elected in 1871. Redistricted to the 4th district.
Sherman Otis Houghton	Republican	4th	March 4, 1873 – March 3, 1875	San Jose	Redistricted from the 1st district and re-elected in 1872. Lost re-election to Wigginton.
Michael Huffington	Republican	22nd	January 3, 1993 – January 3, 1995	Santa Barbara	Elected in 1992. Retired to run for U.S. Senator.
Jared Huffman	Democratic	2nd	January 3, 2013 – present	San Rafael	Elected in 2012. Incumbent.
Allan O. Hunter	Republican	9th	January 3, 1951 – January 3, 1953	Fresno	Elected in 1950. Redistricted to the 12th district.
Allan O. Hunter	Republican	12th	January 3, 1953 – January 3, 1955	Fresno	Redistricted from the 9th district and re-elected in 1952. Lost re-election to Sisk.
Duncan D. Hunter	Republican	52nd	January 3, 2009 – January 3, 2013	Lakeside	Elected in 2008. Redistricted to the 50th district.
Duncan D. Hunter	Republican	50th	January 3, 2013 – January 13, 2020	Lakeside	Redistricted from the 52nd district and re-elected in 2012. Resigned.
Duncan L. Hunter	Republican	42nd	January 3, 1981 – January 3, 1983	Alpine	Elected in 1980. Redistricted to the 45th district.
Duncan L. Hunter	Republican	45th	January 3, 1983 – January 3, 1993	Alpine	Redistricted from the 42nd district and re-elected in 1982. Redistricted to the 52nd district.
Duncan L. Hunter	Republican	52nd	January 3, 1993 – January 3, 2009	Alpine	Redistricted from the 45th district and re-elected in 1992. Retired to run for U.S. President.
Darrell Issa	Republican	48th	January 3, 2001 – January 3, 2003	San Diego	Elected in 2000. Redistricted to the 49th district.
Darrell Issa	Republican	49th	January 3, 2003 – January 3, 2019	San Diego	Redistricted from the 48th district and re-elected in 2002. Retired.
Darrell Issa	Republican	50th	January 3, 2021 – January 3, 2023	San Diego	Elected in 2020. Redistricted to the 48th district.
Darrell Issa	Republican	48th	January 3, 2023 – present	San Diego	Redistricted from the 50th district and re-elected in 2022. Incumbent.
Edouard Izac	Democratic	20th	January 3, 1937 – January 3, 1943	San Diego	Elected in 1936. Redistricted to the 23rd district.
Edouard Izac	Democratic	23rd	January 3, 1943 – January 3, 1947	San Diego	Redistricted from the 20th district and re-elected in 1942. Lost re-election to Fletcher.
Donald L. Jackson	Republican	16th	January 3, 1947 – January 3, 1961	Santa Monica	Elected in 1946. Retired.
Sara Jacobs	Democratic	53rd	January 3, 2021 – January 3, 2023	San Diego	Elected in 2020. Redistricted to the 51st district.
Sara Jacobs	Democratic	51st	January 3, 2023 – present	San Diego	Redistricted from the 53rd district and re-elected in 2022. Incumbent.
Grove L. Johnson	Republican	2nd	March 4, 1895 – March 3, 1897	Sacramento	Elected in 1894. Lost re-election to De Vries.
Harold T. Johnson	Democratic	2nd	January 3, 1959 – January 3, 1975	Roseville	Elected in 1958. Redistricted to the 1st district.
Harold T. Johnson	Democratic	1st	January 3, 1975 – January 3, 1981	Roseville	Redistricted from the 2nd district and re-elected in 1974. Lost re-election to Chappie.
James A. Johnson	Democratic	3rd	March 4, 1867 – March 3, 1871	Downieville	Elected in 1867. Retired.
Justin L. Johnson	Republican	3rd	January 3, 1943 – January 3, 1953	Stockton	Elected in 1942. Redistricted to the 11th district.
Justin L. Johnson	Republican	11th	January 3, 1953 – January 3, 1957	Stockton	Redistricted from the 3rd district and re-elected in 1952. Lost re-election to McFall.
William Ward Johnson	Republican	18th	January 3, 1941 – January 3, 1945	Long Beach	Elected in 1940. Lost re-election to Doyle.
Florence Prag Kahn	Republican	4th	February 17, 1925 – January 3, 1937	San Francisco	Elected to finish the term of her husband, Julius Kahn. Lost re-election to Havenner.
Julius Kahn	Republican	4th	March 4, 1899 – March 3, 1903	San Francisco	Elected in 1898. Lost re-election to Livernash.
Julius Kahn	Republican	4th	March 4, 1905 – December 18, 1924	San Francisco	Elected in 1904. Died.
Sydney Kamlager	Democratic	37th	January 3, 2023 – present	Los Angeles	Elected in 2022. Incumbent.
George A. Kasem	Democratic	25th	January 3, 1959 – January 3, 1961	West Covina	Elected in 1958. Lost re-election to Rousselot.
William Kent	Progressive Republican	2nd	March 4, 1911 – March 3, 1913	Marin County	Elected in 1910. Redistricted to the 1st district.
William Kent	Independent	1st	March 4, 1913 – March 3, 1917	Marin County	Redistricted from the 2nd district and re-elected in 1912 as an independent. Retired.
William M. Ketchum	Republican	36th	January 3, 1973 – January 3, 1975	Bakersfield	Elected in 1972. Redistricted to the 18th district.
William M. Ketchum	Republican	18th	January 3, 1975 – June 24, 1978	Bakersfield	Redistricted from the 36th district and re-elected in 1974. Died.
William Kettner	Democratic	11th	March 4, 1913 – March 3, 1921	San Diego	Elected in 1912. Retired.
Ro Khanna	Democratic	17th	January 3, 2017 – present	Fremont	Elected in 2016. Incumbent.
Kevin Kiley	Republican	3rd	January 3, 2023 – March 19, 2026	Rocklin	Elected in 2022. Switched parties.
Kevin Kiley	Independent	3rd	March 19, 2026 – present	Rocklin	Left the Republican Party. Incumbent.
Jay Kim	Republican	41st	January 3, 1993 – January 3, 1999	Diamond Bar	Elected in 1992. Lost renomination to Miller.
Young Kim	Republican	39th	January 3, 2021 – January 3, 2023	Fullerton	Elected in 2020. Redistricted to the 40th district.
Young Kim	Republican	40th	January 3, 2023 – present	Fullerton	Redistricted from the 39th district and re-elected in 2022. Incumbent.
Cecil R. King	Democratic	17th	August 25, 1942 – January 3, 1969	Los Angeles	Elected to finish Geyer's term. Retired.
Steve Knight	Republican	25th	January 3, 2015 – January 3, 2019	Palmdale	Elected in 2014. Lost re-election to Hill.
Joseph R. Knowland	Republican	3rd	September 24, 1904 – March 3, 1913	Alameda	Elected to finish Metcalf's term. Redistricted to the 6th district.
Joseph R. Knowland	Republican	6th	March 4, 1913 – March 3, 1915	Alameda	Redistricted from the 3rd district and re-elected in 1912. Retired to run for U.S. Senator.
Ernie Konnyu	Republican	12th	January 3, 1987 – January 3, 1989	Santa Clara	Elected in 1986. Lost renomination to Campbell.
Charles Kramer	Democratic	13th	March 3, 1933 – January 3, 1943	Los Angeles	Elected in 1932. Lost re-election to Poulson.
John Hans Krebs	Democratic	17th	January 3, 1975 – January 3, 1979	Fresno	Elected in 1974. Lost re-election to Pashayan Jr.
Steven T. Kuykendall	Republican	36th	January 3, 1999 – January 3, 2001	Rancho Palos Verdes	Elected in 1998. Lost re-election to Harman.
Robert J. Lagomarsino	Republican	13th	March 5, 1974 – January 3, 1975	Ojai	Elected to finish Teague's term. Redistricted to the 19th district.
Robert J. Lagomarsino	Republican	19th	January 3, 1975 – January 3, 1993	Ojai	Redistricted from the 13th district and re-elected in 1974. Redistricted to the 22nd district and lost renomination to Huffington.
Doug LaMalfa	Republican	1st	January 3, 2013 – January 6, 2026	Oroville	Elected in 2012. Died.
Tom Lantos	Democratic	11th	January 3, 1981 – January 3, 1993	San Mateo	Elected in 1980. Redistricted to the 12th district.
Tom Lantos	Democratic	12th	January 3, 1993 – February 11, 2008	San Mateo	Redistricted from the 11th district and re-elected in 1992. Died.
Milton Latham	Democratic	At-large	March 4, 1853 – March 3, 1855	San Francisco	Elected in 1852. Retired.
Clarence F. Lea	Democratic	1st	March 4, 1917 – January 3, 1949	Santa Rosa	Elected in 1916. Retired.
Barbara Lee	Democratic	9th	April 7, 1998 – January 3, 2013	Oakland	Elected to finish Dellums's term. (Note: See Special election musical chairs); Redistricted to the 13th district.
Barbara Lee	Democratic	13th	January 3, 2013 – January 3, 2023	Oakland	Redistricted from the 9th district and re-elected in 2012. Redistricted to the 12th district.
Barbara Lee	Democratic	12th	January 3, 2023 – January 3, 2025	Oakland	Redistricted from the 13th district and re-elected in 2022. Retired to run for U.S. Senator.
Robert L. Leggett	Democratic	4th	January 3, 1963 – January 3, 1979	Vallejo	Elected in 1962. Retired.
Richard H. Lehman	Democratic	18th	January 3, 1983 – January 3, 1993	Sanger	Elected in 1982. Redistricted to the 19th district.
Richard H. Lehman	Democratic	19th	January 3, 1993 – January 3, 1995	Sanger	Redistricted from the 18th district and re-elected in 1992. Lost re-election to Radanovich.
Mike Levin	Democratic	49th	January 3, 2019 – present	San Juan Capistrano	Elected in 2018. Incumbent.
Mel Levine	Democratic	27th	January 3, 1983 – January 3, 1993	Santa Monica	Elected in 1982. Retired to run for U.S. Senator.
Jerry Lewis	Republican	37th	January 3, 1979 – January 3, 1983	Redlands	Elected in 1978. Redistricted to the 35th district.
Jerry Lewis	Republican	35th	January 3, 1983 – January 3, 1993	Redlands	Redistricted from the 37th district and re-elected in 1982. Redistricted to the 40th district.
Jerry Lewis	Republican	40th	January 3, 1993 – January 3, 2003	Redlands	Redistricted from the 35th district and re-elected in 1992. Redistricted to the 41st district.
Jerry Lewis	Republican	41st	January 3, 2003 – January 3, 2013	Redlands	Redistricted from the 40th district and re-elected in 2012. Retired.
Sam Liccardo	Democratic	16th	January 3, 2025 – present	San Jose	Elected in 2024. Incumbent.
Ted Lieu	Democratic	33rd	January 3, 2015 – January 3, 2023	Torrance	Elected in 2014. Redistricted to the 36th district.
Ted Lieu	Democratic	36th	January 3, 2023 – present	Torrance	Redistricted from the 33rd district and re-elected in 2022. Incumbent.
Walter F. Lineberger	Republican	9th	February 15, 1921 – March 3, 1927	Long Beach	Elected to finish Representative-elect Van de Water's term. Retired to run for U.S. Senator.
Glenard P. Lipscomb	Republican	24th	November 17, 1953 – February 1, 1970	Los Angeles	Elected to finish Poulson's term. Died.
Edward J. Livernash	Democratic and Union Labor	4th	March 4, 1903 – March 3, 1905	San Francisco	Elected in 1902. Lost re-election to Kahn.
James F. Lloyd	Democratic	35th	January 3, 1975 – January 3, 1981	West Covina	Elected in 1974. Lost re-election to Dreier.
Zoe Lofgren	Democratic	16th	January 3, 1995 – January 3, 2013	San Jose	Elected in 1994. Redistricted to the 19th district.
Zoe Lofgren	Democratic	19th	January 3, 2013 – January 3, 2023	San Jose	Redistricted from the 16th district and re-elected in 2012. Redistricted to the 18th district.
Zoe Lofgren	Democratic	18th	January 3, 2023 – present	San Jose	Redistricted from the 19th district and re-elected in 2022. Incumbent.
Eugene F. Loud	Republican	5th	March 4, 1891 – March 3, 1903	San Francisco	Elected in 1890. Lost re-election to Wynn.
James A. Louttit	Republican	2nd	March 4, 1885 – March 3, 1887	Stockton	Elected in 1884. Retired.
Frederick Low	Republican	At-large	June 3, 1862 – March 3, 1863	San Francisco	Elected in 1863 but not seated until special Act of Congress was passed, 12 Stat. 411. Retired.
Alan Lowenthal	Democratic	47th	January 3, 2013 – January 3, 2023	Long Beach	Elected in 2012. Retired.
Bill Lowery	Republican	41st	January 3, 1981 – January 3, 1993	San Diego	Elected in 1980. Redistricted to the 51st district and lost renomination to Cunningham.
Dan Lungren	Republican	34th	January 3, 1979 – January 3, 1983	Long Beach	Elected in 1980. Redistricted to the 42nd district.
Dan Lungren	Republican	42nd	January 3, 1983 – January 3, 1989	Long Beach	Redistricted from the 42nd district and re-elected in 1982. Retired while attempting to be appointed State Treasurer.
Dan Lungren	Republican	3rd	January 3, 2005 – January 3, 2013	Gold River	Elected in 2004. Redistricted to the 7th district and lost re-election to Bera.
John K. Luttrell	Democratic	3rd	March 4, 1873 – March 3, 1879	Fort Jones	Elected in 1872. Retired.
James H. MacLafferty	Republican	6th	November 7, 1922 – March 3, 1925	Oakland	Elected to finish Elston's term. Lost renomination to Carter.
James G. Maguire	Democratic	4th	March 4, 1893 – March 3, 1899	San Francisco	Elected in 1892. Retired to run for governor.
William S. Mailliard	Republican	4th	January 3, 1953 – January 3, 1963	San Francisco	Elected in 1952. Redistricted to the 6th district.
William S. Mailliard	Republican	6th	January 3, 1963 – March 5, 1974	San Francisco	Redistricted from the 4th district and re-elected in 1962. Resigned to become permanent Representative to Organization of American States.
Henry H. Markham	Republican	6th	March 4, 1885 – March 3, 1887	Pasadena	Elected in 1884. Retired.
Edward C. Marshall	Democratic	At-large	March 4, 1851 – March 3, 1853	Sonoma	Elected late in 1851. Retired.
Patrick M. Martin	Republican	38th	January 3, 1963 – January 3, 1965	Riverside	Elected in 1962. Lost re-election to Tunney.
Matthew G. Martínez	Democratic	30th	July 13, 1982 – January 3, 1993	Monterey Park	Elected to finish Danielson's term. Redistricted to the 31st district.
Matthew G. Martínez	Democratic	31st	January 3, 1993 – July 27, 2000	Monterey Park	Redistricted from the 30th district and re-elected in 1992. Lost renomination to Solis and changed parties.
Matthew G. Martínez	Republican	31st	July 27, 2000 – January 3, 2001	Monterey Park	Redistricted from the 30th district and re-elected in 1992. Lost renomination to Solis and changed parties.
Robert B. Mathias	Republican	18th	January 3, 1967 – January 3, 1975	Tulare	Elected in 1966. Redistricted to the 17th district and lost re-election to Krebs.
Doris Matsui	Democratic	5th	March 8, 2005 – January 3, 2013	Sacramento	Elected to finish the term of her husband, Bob Matsui. Redistricted to the 6th district.
Doris Matsui	Democratic	6th	March 8, 2013 – January 3, 2023	Sacramento	Redistricted from the 5th district and re-elected in 2012. Redistricted to the 7th district.
Doris Matsui	Democratic	7th	January 3, 2023 – present	Sacramento	Redistricted from the 6th district and re-elected in 2022. Incumbent.
Bob Matsui	Democratic	3rd	January 3, 1979 – January 3, 1993	Sacramento	Elected in 1978. Redistricted to the 5th district.
Bob Matsui	Democratic	5th	January 3, 1993 – January 1, 2005	Sacramento	Redistricted from the 3rd district and re-elected in 1992. Died.
Al McCandless	Republican	37th	January 3, 1983 – January 3, 1993	Bermuda Dunes	Elected in 1982. Redistricted to the 44th district.
Al McCandless	Republican	44th	January 3, 1993 – January 3, 1995	Bermuda Dunes	Redistricted from the 37th district and re-elected in 1992. Retired.
Kevin McCarthy	Republican	22nd	January 3, 2007 – January 3, 2013	Bakersfield	Elected in 2006. Redistricted to the 23rd district.
Kevin McCarthy	Republican	23rd	January 3, 2013 – January 3, 2023	Bakersfield	Redistricted from the 22nd district and re-elected in 2012. Redistricted to the 20th district.
Kevin McCarthy	Republican	20th	January 3, 2023 – December 31, 2023	Bakersfield	Redistricted from the 23rd district and re-elected in 2022. Resigned.
Tom McClintock	Republican	4th	January 3, 2009 – January 3, 2023	Thousand Oaks	Elected in 2008. Redistricted to the 5th district.
Tom McClintock	Republican	5th	January 3, 2023 – present	Thousand Oaks	Redistricted from the 4th district and re-elected in 2022. Incumbent.
Pete McCloskey	Republican	11th	December 12, 1967 – January 3, 1973	Portola Valley	Elected to finish Younger's term. Redistricted to the 17th district.
Pete McCloskey	Republican	17th	January 3, 1973 – January 3, 1975	Portola Valley	Redistricted from the 11th district and re-elected in 1972. Redistricted to the 12th district.
Pete McCloskey	Republican	12th	January 3, 1975 – January 3, 1983	Portola Valley	Redistricted from the 17th district and re-elected in 1974. Retired to run for U.S. Senator.
Joseph W. McCorkle	Democratic	At-large	March 4, 1851 – March 3, 1853	San Francisco	Elected late in 1851. Lost renomination to Latham and McDougall.
Gordon L. McDonough	Republican	15th	January 3, 1945 – January 3, 1963	Los Angeles	Elected in 1944. Redistricted to the 30th district and lost re-election to Roybal.
James A. McDougall	Democratic	At-large	March 4, 1853 – March 3, 1855	San Francisco	Elected in 1852. Retired.
John J. McFall	Democratic	11th	January 3, 1957 – January 3, 1963	Manteca	Elected in 1956. Redistricted to the 15th district.
John J. McFall	Democratic	15th	January 3, 1963 – January 3, 1975	Manteca	Redistricted from the 11th district and re-elected in 1962. Redistricted to the 14th district.
John J. McFall	Democratic	14th	January 3, 1975 – December 31, 1978	Manteca	Redistricted from the 15th district and re-elected in 1974. Lost re-election to Shumway and resigned early.
John J. McGrath	Democratic	8th	March 4, 1933 – January 3, 1939	Hillsborough	Elected in 1932. Lost re-election to Anderson.
John S. McGroarty	Democratic	11th	January 3, 1935 – January 3, 1939	Los Angeles	Elected in 1934. Retired to run for secretary of state.
Joseph McKenna	Republican	3rd	March 4, 1885 – March 28, 1892	Suisun City	Elected in 1884. Resigned to serve on the U.S. Court of Appeals for the Ninth Circuit.
Howard McKeon	Republican	25th	January 3, 1993 – January 3, 2015	Santa Clarita	Elected in 1992. Retired.
Joseph C. McKibbin	Democratic	At-large	March 4, 1857 – March 3, 1859	Downieville	Elected in 1856. Lost re-election to Burch and Scott.
Duncan E. McKinlay	Republican	2nd	March 4, 1905 – March 3, 1911	San Francisco	Elected in 1904. Lost renomination to Kent.
Clinton D. McKinnon	Democratic	23rd	January 3, 1949 – January 3, 1953	San Diego	Elected in 1948. Retired to run for U.S. Senator.
James McLachlan	Republican	6th	March 4, 1895 – March 3, 1897	Pasadena	Elected in 1894. Lost re-election to Barlow.
James McLachlan	Republican	6th	March 4, 1901 – March 3, 1903	Pasadena	Elected in 1896. Redistricted to the 7th district.
James McLachlan	Republican	7th	March 4, 1903 – March 3, 1911	Pasadena	Redistricted from the 6th district and re-elected in 1902. Lost renomination to Stephens.
Jerry McNerney	Democratic	11th	January 3, 2007 – January 3, 2013	Pleasanton	Elected in 2006. Redistricted to the 9th district.
Jerry McNerney	Democratic	9th	January 3, 2013 – January 3, 2023	Pleasanton	Redistricted from the 11th district and re-elected in 2012. Retired.
Donald C. McRuer	Republican	1st	March 4, 1865 – March 3, 1867	San Francisco	Elected in 1864. Retired.
Victor H. Metcalf	Republican	3rd	March 4, 1899 – July 1, 1904	Oakland	Elected in 1898. Resigned to become U.S. Secretary of Commerce and Labor.
Juanita Millender-McDonald	Democratic	37th	March 26, 1996 – April 22, 2007	Carson	Elected to finish Tucker's term. Died.
Clement Woodnutt Miller	Democratic	1st	January 3, 1959 – October 7, 1962	Marin County	Elected in 1958. Died.
Gary Miller	Republican	41st	January 3, 1999 – January 3, 2003	Diamond Bar	Elected in 1998. Redistricted to the 42nd district.
Gary Miller	Republican	42nd	January 3, 2003 – January 3, 2013	Diamond Bar	Redistricted from the 41st district and re-elected in 2002. Redistricted to the 31st district.
Gary Miller	Republican	31st	January 3, 2013 – January 3, 2015	Diamond Bar	Redistricted from the 42nd district and re-elected in 2012. Retired.
George Miller	Democratic	7th	January 3, 1975 – January 3, 2013	Martinez	Elected in 1974. Redistricted to the 11th district.
George Miller	Democratic	11th	January 3, 2013 – January 3, 2015	Martinez	Redistricted from the 7th district and re-elected in 2012. Retired.
George Paul Miller	Democratic	6th	January 3, 1945 – January 3, 1953	Alameda	Elected in 1944. Redistricted to the 8th district.
George Paul Miller	Democratic	8th	January 3, 1953 – January 3, 1973	Alameda	Redistricted from the 6th district and re-elected in 1952. Lost renomination to Stark.
Dave Min	Democratic	47th	January 3, 2025 – present	Irvine	Elected in 2024. Incumbent.
Norman Mineta	Democratic	13th	January 3, 1975 – January 3, 1993	San Jose	Elected in 1974. Redistricted to the 15th district.
Norman Mineta	Democratic	15th	January 3, 1993 – October 10, 1995	San Jose	Redistricted from the 13th district and re-elected in 1992. Resigned to become senior vice president of the transportation division of Lockheed Martin.
Carlos Moorhead	Republican	20th	January 3, 1973 – January 3, 1975	Glendale	Elected in 1972. Redistricted to the 22nd district.
Carlos Moorhead	Republican	22nd	January 3, 1975 – January 3, 1993	Glendale	Redistricted from the 20th district and re-elected in 1974. Redistricted to the 27th district.
Carlos Moorhead	Republican	27th	January 3, 1993 – January 3, 1997	Glendale	Redistricted from the 22nd district and re-elected in 1992. Retired.
William W. Morrow	Republican	4th	March 4, 1885 – March 3, 1891	San Francisco	Elected in 1884. Retired.
John E. Moss	Democratic	3rd	January 3, 1953 – December 31, 1978	Sacramento	Elected in 1952. Retired.
Kevin Mullin	Democratic	15th	January 3, 2023 – present	San Francisco	Elected in 2022. Incumbent.
Grace Napolitano	Democratic	34th	January 3, 1999 – January 3, 2003	Norwalk	Elected in 1998. Redistricted to the 38th district.
Grace Napolitano	Democratic	38th	January 3, 2003 – January 3, 2013	Norwalk	Redistricted from the 34th district and re-elected in 2002. Redistricted to the 32nd district.
Grace Napolitano	Democratic	32nd	January 3, 2013 – January 3, 2023	Norwalk	Redistricted from the 38th district and re-elected in 2012. Redistricted to the 31st district.
Grace Napolitano	Democratic	31st	January 3, 2023 – January 3, 2025	Norwalk	Redistricted from the 32nd district and re-elected in 2022. Retired.
James C. Needham	Republican	7th	March 4, 1899 – March 3, 1903	San Diego	Elected in 1898. Redistricted to the 6th district.
James C. Needham	Republican	6th	March 4, 1903 – March 3, 1913	San Diego	Redistricted from the 7th district and re-elected in 1902. Lost re-election to Church.
Gloria Negrete McLeod	Democratic	35th	January 3, 2013 – January 3, 2015	Chino	Elected in 2012. Retired to run for San Bernardino County Board of Supervisors.
Richard Nixon	Republican	12th	January 3, 1947 – November 30, 1950	Whittier	Elected in 1946. Resigned to run for U.S. Senator.
John I. Nolan	Republican	5th	March 4, 1913 – November 18, 1922	San Francisco	Elected in 1912. Died.
Mae Nolan	Republican	5th	January 23, 1923 – March 3, 1925	San Francisco	Elected to finish the term of her husband, John I. Nolan. Retired.
Devin Nunes	Republican	21st	January 3, 2003 – January 3, 2013	Tulare	Elected in 2002. Redistricted to the 22nd district.
Devin Nunes	Republican	22nd	January 3, 2013 – January 3, 2022	Tulare	Redistricted from the 21st district and re-elected in 2012. Resigned to become CEO of Trump Media & Technology Group.
Jay Obernolte	Republican	8th	January 3, 2021 – January 3, 2023	Big Bear Lake Elected in 2020.Redistricted to the 23rd district.	
Jay Obernolte	Republican	23rd	January 3, 2023 – present	Big Bear Lake Elected in 2020.Redistricted to the 23rd district.	Redistricted from the 8th district and re-elected in 2022. Incumbent.
Henry Z. Osborne	Republican	10th	March 4, 1917 – February 8, 1923	Los Angeles	Elected in 1916. Died.
Doug Ose	Republican	3rd	January 3, 1999 – January 3, 2005	Sacramento	Elected in 1998. Retired.
George E. Outland	Democratic	11th	January 3, 1943 – January 3, 1947	Los Angeles	Elected in 1942. Lost re-election to Bramblett.
Romualdo Pacheco	Republican	4th	March 4, 1877 – February 7, 1878	San Luis Obispo	Elected in 1876. Resigned when House Elections Committee refused to certify his election.
Romualdo Pacheco	Republican	4th	March 4, 1879 – March 3, 1883	San Luis Obispo	Elected in 1879. Retired.
Ron Packard	Republican	43rd	January 3, 1983 – January 3, 1993	Carlsbad	Elected in 1982. Redistricted to the 48th district.
Ron Packard	Republican	48th	January 3, 1993 – January 3, 2001	Carlsbad	Redistricted from the 43rd district and Elected in 1992. Retired.
Horace F. Page	Republican	2nd	March 4, 1873 – March 3, 1883	Placerville	Elected in 1872. Lost re-election to Budd.
Jimmy Panetta	Democratic	20th	January 3, 2017 – January 3, 2023	Carmel Valley	Elected in 2016. Redistricted to the 19th district.
Jimmy Panetta	Democratic	19th	January 3, 2023 – present	Carmel Valley	Redistricted from the 20th district and re-elected in 2022. Incumbent.
Leon Panetta	Democratic	16th	January 3, 1977 – January 3, 1993	Carmel Valley	Elected in 1976. Redistricted to the 17th district.
Leon Panetta	Democratic	17th	January 3, 1993 – January 23, 1993	Carmel Valley	Redistricted from the 16th district and re-elected in 1992. Resigned to become Director of the Office of Management and Budget.
Chip Pashayan	Republican	17th	January 3, 1979 – January 3, 1991	Fresno	Elected in 1978. Lost re-election to Dooley.
Ellis E. Patterson	Democratic	16th	January 3, 1945 – January 3, 1947	Yuba City	Elected in 1944. Retired to run for U.S. Senator.
Jerry M. Patterson	Democratic	38th	January 3, 1975 – January 3, 1985	Santa Ana	Elected in 1974. Lost re-election to Dornan.
Nancy Pelosi	Democratic	5th	June 2, 1987 – January 3, 1993	San Francisco	Elected to finish Burton's term. Redistricted to the 8th district.
Nancy Pelosi	Democratic	8th	January 3, 1993 – January 3, 2013	San Francisco	Redistricted from the 5th district and re-elected in 1992. Redistricted to the 12th district.
Nancy Pelosi	Democratic	12th	January 3, 2013 – January 3, 2023	San Francisco	Redistricted from the 8th district and re-elected in 2012. Redistricted to the 11th district.
Nancy Pelosi	Democratic	11th	January 3, 2023 – present	San Francisco	Redistricted from the 12th district and re-elected in 2022. Incumbent.
Scott Peters	Democratic	52nd	January 3, 2013 – January 3, 2023	San Diego	Elected in 2012. Redistricted to the 50th district.
Scott Peters	Democratic	50th	January 3, 2023 – present	San Diego	Redistricted from the 52nd district and re-elected in 2022. Incumbent.
Jerry Lyle Pettis	Republican	33rd	January 3, 1967 – January 3, 1975	Loma Linda	Elected in 1966. Redistricted to the 37th district.
Jerry Lyle Pettis	Republican	37th	January 3, 1975 – February 14, 1975	Loma Linda	Redistricted from the 33rd district and re-elected in 1974. Died.
Shirley Neil Pettis	Republican	37th	April 29, 1975 – January 3, 1979	Loma Linda	Elected to finish the term of her husband, Jerry Pettis. Retired.
Timothy Guy Phelps	Republican	At-large	March 4, 1861 – March 3, 1863	San Francisco	Elected in 1861. Retired.
John J. Phillips	Republican	22nd	January 3, 1943 – January 3, 1953	Banning	Elected in 1942. Redistricted to the 29th district.
John J. Phillips	Republican	29th	January 3, 1953 – January 3, 1957	Banning	Redistricted from the 22nd district and re-elected in 1952. Retired.
William Adam Piper	Democratic	1st	March 4, 1875 – March 3, 1877	San Francisco	Elected in 1875. Lost re-election to H. Davis
Richard W. Pombo	Republican	11th	January 3, 1993 – January 3, 2007	Tracy	Elected in 1992. Lost re-election to McNerney.
Katie Porter	Democratic	45th	January 3, 2019 – January 3, 2023	Irvine	Elected in 2018. Redistricted to the 47th district.
Katie Porter	Democratic	47th	January 3, 2023 – January 3, 2025	Irvine	Redistricted from the 45th district and re-elected in 2022. Retired to run for U.S. Senator.
Norris Poulson	Republican	13th	January 3, 1943 – January 3, 1945	Los Angeles	Elected in 1942. Lost re-election to Healy.
Norris Poulson	Republican	13th	January 3, 1947 – January 3, 1953	Los Angeles	Elected in 1946. Redistricted to the 24th district.
Norris Poulson	Republican	24th	January 3, 1953 – June 11, 1953	Los Angeles	Redistricted from the 13th district and re-elected in 1952. Resigned to become Mayor of Los Angeles.
George Radanovich	Republican	19th	January 3, 1995 – January 3, 2011	Mariposa	Elected in 1994. Retired.
John E. Raker	Democratic	1st	March 4, 1911 – March 3, 1913	Alturas	Elected in 1910. Redistricted to the 2nd district.
John E. Raker	Democratic	2nd	March 4, 1913 – January 22, 1926	Alturas	Redistricted from the 1st district and re-elected in 1912. Died.
Charles Hiram Randall	Prohibitionist	9th	March 4, 1915 – March 3, 1921	Los Angeles	Elected in 1914. Lost re-election to Van de Water
Thomas M. Rees	Democratic	26th	December 15, 1965 – January 3, 1975	Los Angeles	Elected to finish Roosevelt's term. Redistricted to the 23rd district.
Thomas M. Rees	Democratic	23rd	January 3, 1975 – January 3, 1977	Los Angeles	Redistricted from the 26th district and re-elected in 1974. Retired.
Edwin Reinecke	Republican	27th	January 3, 1965 – January 21, 1969	Los Angeles	Elected in 1964. Resigned to become Lieutenant Governor of California.
Laura Richardson	Democratic	37th	August 21, 2007 – January 3, 2013	Long Beach	Elected to finish Millender-McDonald's term. Redistricted to the 44th district and lost re-election to Hahn.
Frank D. Riggs	Republican	1st	January 3, 1991 – January 3, 1993	Healdsburg	Elected in 1990. Lost re-election to Hamburg.
Frank D. Riggs	Republican	1st	January 3, 1995 – January 3, 1999	Healdsburg	Elected in 1994. Retired to run for U.S. Senator.
Luz Rivas	Democratic	29th	January 3, 2025 – present	Los Angeles	Elected in 2024. Incumbent.
James E. Rogan	Republican	27th	January 3, 1997 – January 3, 2001	Glendale	Elected in 1996. Lost re-election to Schiff.
Will Rogers Jr.	Democratic	16th	January 3, 1943 – May 23, 1944	Culver City	Elected in 1942. Resigned to return to active duty in the Army.
Dana Rohrabacher	Republican	42nd	January 3, 1989 – January 3, 1993	Huntington Beach	Elected in 1988. Redistricted to the 45th district.
Dana Rohrabacher	Republican	45th	January 3, 1993 – January 3, 2003	Huntington Beach	Redistricted from the 42nd district and re-elected in 1992. Redistricted to the 46th district.
Dana Rohrabacher	Republican	46th	January 3, 2003 – January 3, 2013	Huntington Beach	Redistricted from the 45th district and re-elected in 2002. Redistricted to the 48th district.
Dana Rohrabacher	Republican	48th	January 3, 2013 – January 3, 2019	Huntington Beach	Redistricted from the 46th district and re-elected in 2012. Lost re-election to Rouda.
Thomas Rolph	Republican	4th	January 3, 1941 – January 3, 1945	San Francisco	Elected in 1940. Lost re-election to Havenner.
James Roosevelt	Democratic	26th	January 3, 1955 – September 30, 1965	Los Angeles	Elected in 1954. Resigned to run for Mayor of Los Angeles.
William Rosecrans	Democratic	1st	March 4, 1881 – March 3, 1885	San Francisco	Elected in 1880. Retired.
Harley Rouda	Democratic	48th	January 3, 2019 – January 3, 2021	Laguna Beach	Elected in 2018. Lost re-election to Steel.
John H. Rousselot	Republican	25th	January 3, 1961 – January 3, 1963	Los Angeles	Elected in 1960. Lost re-election to Cameron.
John H. Rousselot	Republican	24th	June 30, 1970 – January 3, 1975	Los Angeles	Elected to finish Lipscomb's term. Redistricted to the 26th district.
John H. Rousselot	Republican	26th	January 3, 1975 – January 3, 1983	Los Angeles	Redistricted from the 24th district and re-elected in 1974. Redistricted to the 30th district and lost re-election to Martinez.
Edward R. Roybal	Democratic	30th	January 3, 1963 – January 3, 1975	Los Angeles	Elected in 1962. Redistricted to the 25th district.
Edward R. Roybal	Democratic	25th	January 3, 1975 – January 3, 1993	Los Angeles	Redistricted from the 30th district and re-elected in 1974. Retired.
Lucille Roybal-Allard	Democratic	33rd	January 3, 1993 – January 3, 2003	Los Angeles	Elected in 1992. Redistricted to the 34th district.
Lucille Roybal-Allard	Democratic	34th	January 3, 2003 – January 3, 2013	Los Angeles	Redistricted from the 33rd district and re-elected in 2002. Redistricted to the 40th district.
Lucille Roybal-Allard	Democratic	40th	January 3, 2013 – January 3, 2023	Los Angeles	Redistricted from the 34th district and re-elected in 2012. Retired.
Ed Royce	Republican	39th	January 3, 1993 – January 3, 2003	Fullerton	Elected in 1992. Redistricted to the 40th district.
Ed Royce	Republican	40th	January 3, 2003 – January 3, 2013	Fullerton	Redistricted from the 39th district and re-elected in 2002. Redistricted to the 39th district.
Ed Royce	Republican	39th	January 3, 2013 – January 3, 2019	Fullerton	Redistricted from the 40th district and re-elected in 2012. Retired.
William Royer	Republican	11th	April 3, 1979 – January 3, 1981	Redwood City	Elected to finish Ryan's term. Lost re-election to Lantos.
Raul Ruiz	Democratic	36th	January 3, 2013 – January 3, 2023	Coachella	Elected in 2012. Redistricted to the 25th district.
Raul Ruiz	Democratic	25th	January 3, 2023 – present	Coachella	Redistricted from the 36th district and re-elected in 2012. Incumbent.
Leo Ryan	Democratic	11th	January 3, 1973 – November 18, 1978	South San Francisco	Elected in 1972. Died.
Linda Sánchez	Democratic	39th	January 3, 2003 – January 3, 2013	Whittier	Elected in 2002. Redistricted to the 38th district.
Linda Sánchez	Democratic	38th	January 3, 2013 – present	Whittier	Redistricted from the 39th district and re-elected in 2012. Incumbent.
Loretta Sanchez	Democratic	46th	January 3, 1997 – January 3, 2003	Anaheim	Elected in 1996. Redistricted to the 47th district.
Loretta Sanchez	Democratic	47th	January 3, 2003 – January 3, 2013	Anaheim	Redistricted from the 46th district and re-elected in 2002. Redistricted to the 46th district.
Loretta Sanchez	Democratic	46th	January 3, 2013 – January 3, 2017	Anaheim	Redistricted from the 47th district and re-elected in 2012. Retired to run for U.S. Senator.
Aaron Augustus Sargent	Republican	At-large	March 4, 1861 – March 3, 1863	Nevada City	Elected in 1861. Retired.
Aaron Augustus Sargent	Republican	2nd	March 4, 1869 – March 3, 1873	Nevada City	Elected in 1868. Retired to run for U.S. Senator.
Dalip Singh Saund	Democratic	29th	January 3, 1957 – January 3, 1963	Westmorland	Elected in 1958. Redistricted to the 38th district and lost re-election to Martin.
Lynn Schenk	Democratic	49th	January 3, 1993 – January 3, 1995	San Diego	Elected in 1992. Lost re-election to Bilbray.
Adam Schiff	Democratic	27th	January 3, 2001 – January 3, 2003	Burbank	Elected in 2000. Redistricted to the 29th district.
Adam Schiff	Democratic	29th	January 3, 2003 – January 3, 2013	Burbank	Redistricted from the 27th district and re-elected in 2002. Redistricted to the 28th district.
Adam Schiff	Democratic	28th	January 3, 2013 – January 3, 2023	Burbank	Redistricted from the 29th district and re-elected in 2012. Redistricted to the 30th district.
Adam Schiff	Democratic	30th	January 3, 2023 – December 8, 2024	Burbank	Redistricted from the 28th district and re-elected in 2022. Retired to run for U.S. Senator and resigned to take office.
John G. Schmitz	Republican	35th	June 30, 1970 – January 3, 1973	Santa Ana	Elected to finish Utt's term. Redistricted to the 39th district and lost renomination to Hinshaw.
Byron N. Scott	Democratic	18th	January 3, 1935 – January 3, 1939	Long Beach	Elected in 1934. Lost re-election to Eaton.
Charles L. Scott	Democratic	At-large	March 4, 1857 – March 3, 1861	Sonora	Elected in 1856. Retired.
Hubert B. Scudder	Republican	1st	January 3, 1949 – January 3, 1959	Sebastopol	Elected in 1948. Retired.
Andrea Seastrand	Republican	22nd	January 3, 1995 – January 3, 1997	Santa Barbara	Elected in 1994. Lost re-election to Capps.
Thomas Bowles Shannon	Republican	At-large	January 3, 1863 – January 3, 1865	San Francisco	Elected in 1863. Retired.
John F. Shelley	Democratic	5th	November 8, 1949 – January 7, 1964	San Francisco	Elected to finish Welch's term. Resigned to become mayor of San Francisco.
Harry R. Sheppard	Democratic	19th	January 3, 1937 – January 3, 1943	Yucaipa	Elected in 1936. Redistricted to the 21st district.
Harry R. Sheppard	Democratic	21st	January 3, 1943 – January 3, 1953	Yucaipa	Redistricted from the 19th district and re-elected in 1942. Redistricted to the 27th district.
Harry R. Sheppard	Democratic	27th	January 3, 1953 – January 3, 1963	Yucaipa	Redistricted from the 21st district and re-elected in 1952. Redistricted to the 33rd district.
Harry R. Sheppard	Democratic	33rd	January 3, 1963 – January 3, 1965	Yucaipa	Redistricted from the 27th district and re-elected in 1962. Retired.
Brad Sherman	Democratic	24th	January 3, 1997 – January 3, 2003	Sherman Oaks	Elected in 1996. Redistricted to the 27th district.
Brad Sherman	Democratic	27th	January 3, 2003 – January 3, 2013	Sherman Oaks	Redistricted from the 24th district and re-elected in 2002. Redistricted to the 30th district.
Brad Sherman	Democratic	30th	January 3, 2013 – January 3, 2023	Sherman Oaks	Redistricted from the 27th district and re-elected in 2012. Redistricted to the 32nd district.
Brad Sherman	Democratic	32nd	January 3, 2023 – present	Sherman Oaks	Redistricted from the 30th district and re-elected in 2022. Incumbent.
Norman D. Shumway	Republican	14th	January 3, 1979 – January 3, 1991	Stockton	Elected in 1978. Retired.
Lateefah Simon	Democratic	12th	January 3, 2025 – present	Emeryville	Elected in 2024. Incumbent.
Bernice F. Sisk	Democratic	12th	January 3, 1955 – January 3, 1963	Fresno	Elected in 1954. Redistricted to the 16th district.
Bernice F. Sisk	Democratic	16th	January 3, 1963 – January 3, 1975	Fresno	Redistricted from the 12th district and re-elected in 1962. Redistricted to the 15th district.
Bernice F. Sisk	Democratic	15th	January 3, 1975 – January 3, 1979	Fresno	Redistricted from the 12th district and re-elected in 1974. Retired.
Sylvester C. Smith	Republican	8th	March 4, 1905 – January 26, 1913	Bakersfield	Elected in 1904. Died.
H. Allen Smith	Republican	20th	January 3, 1957 – January 3, 1973	Glendale	Elected in 1956. Retired.
Hilda Solis	Democratic	31st	January 3, 2001 – January 3, 2003	El Monte	Elected in 2000. Redistricted to the 32nd district.
Hilda Solis	Democratic	32nd	January 3, 2003 – February 24, 2009	El Monte	Redistricted from the 31st district and re-elected in 2002. Resigned to become U.S. Secretary of Labor.
Jackie Speier	Democratic	12th	April 10, 2008 – January 3, 2013	Hillsborough	Elected to finish Lantos's term. Redistricted to the 14th district.
Jackie Speier	Democratic	14th	January 3, 2013 – January 3, 2023	Hillsborough	Redistricted from the 12th district and re-elected in 2012. Retired.
Pete Stark	Democratic	8th	January 3, 1973 – January 3, 1975	Fremont	Elected in 1972. Redistricted to the 9th district.
Pete Stark	Democratic	9th	January 3, 1975 – January 3, 1993	Fremont	Redistricted from the 8th district and re-elected in 1974. Redistricted to the 13th district.
Pete Stark	Democratic	13th	January 3, 1993 – January 3, 2013	Fremont	Redistricted from the 9th district and re-elected in 1992. Redistricted to the 15th district and lost re-election to Swalwell.
Michelle Steel	Republican	48th	January 3, 2021 – January 3, 2023	Surfside	Elected in 2020. Redistricted to the 45th district.
Michelle Steel	Republican	45th	January 3, 2023 – January 3, 2025	Surfside	Redistricted from the 48th district and re-elected in 2022. Lost re-election to Tran.
William Stephens	Republican	7th	March 4, 1911 – March 3, 1913	Los Angeles	Elected in 1910. Changed parties.
William Stephens	Progressive	10th	March 4, 1913 – July 22, 1916	Los Angeles	re-elected in 1912 as a Progressive. Resigned to become lieutenant governor.
Henry E. Stubbs	Democratic	10th	March 4, 1933 – February 28, 1937	Santa Maria	Elected in 1932. Died.
Charles A. Sumner	Democratic	At-large	March 4, 1883 – March 3, 1885	San Francisco	Elected in 1882. Redistricted to the 2nd district and lost re-election to Louttit.
Eric Swalwell	Democratic	15th	January 3, 2013 – January 3, 2023	Dublin	Elected in 2012. Redistricted to the 14th district.
Eric Swalwell	Democratic	14th	January 3, 2023 – April 14, 2026	Dublin	Redistricted from the 15th district and re-elected in 2022. Resigned.
Phil Swing	Republican	11th	March 4, 1921 – March 3, 1933	San Diego	Elected in 1920. Retired.
Mark Takano	Democratic	41st	January 3, 2013 – January 3, 2023	Riverside	Elected in 2012. Redistricted to the 39th district.
Mark Takano	Democratic	39th	January 3, 2023 – present	Riverside	Redistricted from the 41st district and re-elected in 2022. Incumbent.
Burt L. Talcott	Republican	12th	January 3, 1963 – January 3, 1975	Salinas	Elected in 1962. Redistricted to the 16th district.
Burt L. Talcott	Republican	16th	January 3, 1975 – January 3, 1977	Salinas	Redistricted from the 12th district and re-elected in 1974. Lost re-election to Panetta.
Ellen Tauscher	Democratic	10th	January 3, 1997 – June 26, 2009	Alamo	Elected in 1996. Resigned to become Under Secretary of State for Arms Control and International Security Affairs.
Charles M. Teague	Republican	13th	January 3, 1955 – January 1, 1974	Ojai	Elected in 1954. Died.
Bill Thomas	Republican	18th	January 3, 1979 – January 3, 1983	Bakersfield	Elected in 1978. Redistricted to the 20th district.
Bill Thomas	Republican	20th	January 3, 1983 – January 3, 1993	Bakersfield	Redistricted from the 18th district and re-elected in 1982. Redistricted to the 21st district.
Bill Thomas	Republican	21st	January 3, 1993 – January 3, 2003	Bakersfield	Redistricted from the 20th district and re-elected in 1992. Redistricted to the 22nd district.
Bill Thomas	Republican	22nd	January 3, 2003 – January 3, 2007	Bakersfield	Redistricted from the 21st district and re-elected in 2002. Retired.
Mike Thompson	Democratic	1st	January 3, 1999 – January 3, 2013	St. Helena	Elected in 1998. Redistricted to the 5th district.
Mike Thompson	Democratic	5th	January 3, 2013 – January 3, 2023	St. Helena	Redistricted from the 1st district and re-elected in 2012. Redistricted to the 4th district.
Mike Thompson	Democratic	4th	January 3, 2023 – present	St. Helena	Redistricted from the 5th district and re-elected in 2022. Incumbent.
Thomas Larkin Thompson	Democratic	1st	March 4, 1887 – March 3, 1889	Santa Rosa	Elected in 1886. Lost re-election to De Haven.
John H. Tolan	Democratic	7th	January 3, 1935 – January 3, 1947	Oakland	Elected in 1934. Retired.
Esteban Edward Torres	Democratic	34th	January 3, 1983 – January 3, 1999	La Puente	Elected in 1982. Retired.
Norma Torres	Democratic	35th	January 3, 2015 – present	Pomona	Elected in 2014. Incumbent.
William I. Traeger	Republican	15th	March 4, 1933 – January 3, 1935	Los Angeles	Elected in 1932. Lost re-election to Costello.
Derek Tran	Democratic	45th	January 3, 2025 – present	Orange	Elected in 2024. Incumbent.
Walter R. Tucker III	Democratic	37th	January 3, 1993 – December 15, 1995	Compton	Elected in 1992. Resigned.
Pleasant B. Tully	Democratic	4th	March 4, 1883 – March 3, 1885	Gilroy	Elected in 1882. Retired.
John V. Tunney	Democratic	38th	January 3, 1965 – January 3, 1971	Riverside	Elected in 1964. Retired to run for U.S. Senator.
James B. Utt	Republican	28th	January 3, 1953 – January 3, 1963	Santa Ana	Elected in 1952. Redistricted to the 35th district.
James B. Utt	Republican	35th	January 3, 1963 – March 1, 1970	Santa Ana	Redistricted from the 28th district and re-elected in 1962. Died.
David Valadao	Republican	21st	January 3, 2013 – January 3, 2019	Hanford	Elected in 2012. Lost re-election to Cox.
David Valadao	Republican	21st	January 3, 2021 – January 3, 2023	Hanford	Elected in 2020. Redistricted to the 22nd district.
David Valadao	Republican	22nd	January 3, 2023 – present	Hanford	Redistricted from the 21st district and re-elected in 2022. Incumbent.
Lionel Van Deerlin	Democratic	37th	January 3, 1963 – January 3, 1973	San Diego	Elected in 1962. Redistricted to the 41st district.
Lionel Van Deerlin	Democratic	41st	January 3, 1973 – January 3, 1975	San Diego	Redistricted from the 37th district and re-elected in 1972. Redistricted to the 42nd district.
Lionel Van Deerlin	Democratic	42nd	January 3, 1975 – January 3, 1981	San Diego	Redistricted from the 41st district and re-elected in 1974. Lost re-election to D. L. Hunter.
William Vandever	Republican	6th	March 4, 1887 – March 3, 1891	San Buenaventura	Elected in 1886. Retired.
Juan Vargas	Democratic	51st	January 3, 2013 – January 3, 2023	San Diego	Elected in 2012. Redistricted to the 42nd district.
Juan Vargas	Democratic	52nd	January 3, 2023 – present	San Diego	Redistricted to the 51st district and re-elected in 2022. Incumbent.
Victor Veysey	Republican	38th	January 3, 1971 – January 3, 1973	Brawley	Elected in 1970. Redistricted to the 43rd district.
Victor Veysey	Republican	43rd	January 3, 1973 – January 3, 1975	Brawley	Redistricted from the 38th district and re-elected in 1972. Redistricted to the 35th district and lost re-election to Lloyd.
Jerry Voorhis	Democratic	12th	January 3, 1937 – January 3, 1947	San Dimas	Elected in 1936. Lost re-election to Nixon.
Aisha Wahab	Democratic	14th	August 18, 2026 – present	Hayward	Elected to finish Swalwell's term. Incumbent.
Jerome R. Waldie	Democratic	14th	June 7, 1966 – January 3, 1975	Antioch	Elected to finish Baldwin's term. Retired to run for Governor of California.
Maxine Waters	Democratic	29th	January 3, 1991 – January 3, 1993	Los Angeles	Elected in 1990. Redistricted to the 35th district.
Maxine Waters	Democratic	35th	January 3, 1993 – January 3, 2013	Los Angeles	Redistricted from the 29th district and re-elected in 1992. Redistricted to the 43rd district.
Maxine Waters	Democratic	43rd	January 3, 2013 – present	Los Angeles	Redistricted from the 35th district and re-elected in 2012. Incumbent.
Mimi Walters	Republican	45th	January 3, 2015 – January 3, 2019	Laguna Niguel	Elected in 2014. Lost re-election to Porter.
Russell J. Waters	Republican	6th	March 4, 1899 – March 3, 1901	Redlands	Elected in 1898. Retired.
Diane Watson	Democratic	32nd	June 5, 2001 – January 3, 2003	Los Angeles	Elected to finish Dixon's term. Redistricted to the 33rd district.
Diane Watson	Democratic	33rd	January 3, 2003 – January 3, 2011	Los Angeles	Redistricted from the 32nd district and re-elected in 2002. Retired.
Henry Waxman	Democratic	24th	January 3, 1975 – January 3, 1993	Los Angeles	Elected in 1974. Redistricted to the 29th district.
Henry Waxman	Democratic	29th	January 3, 1993 – January 3, 2003	Los Angeles	Redistricted from the 24th district and re-elected in 1992. Redistricted to the 30th district.
Henry Waxman	Democratic	30th	January 3, 2003 – January 3, 2013	Los Angeles	Redistricted from the 29th district and re-elected in 2002. Redistricted to the 33rd district.
Henry Waxman	Democratic	33rd	January 3, 2013 – January 3, 2015	Los Angeles	Redistricted from the 30th district and re-elected in 2012. Retired.
Richard J. Welch	Republican	5th	August 31, 1926 – September 10, 1949	San Francisco	Elected to finish Flaherty's term. Died.
Thomas H. Werdel	Republican	10th	January 3, 1949 – January 3, 1953	Bakersfield	Elected in 1948. Redistricted to the 14th district and lost re-election to Hagen.
Cecil F. White	Democratic	9th	January 3, 1949 – January 3, 1951	Fresno	Elected in 1948. Lost re-election to A. Hunter.
George T. Whitesides	Democratic	27th	January 3, 2025 – present	Agua Dulce	Elected in 2024. Incumbent.
Charles E. Wiggins	Republican	25th	January 3, 1967 – January 3, 1975	El Monte	Elected in 1966. Redistricted to the 39th district.
Charles E. Wiggins	Republican	39th	January 3, 1975 – January 3, 1979	El Monte	Redistricted to the 25th district and re-elected in 1974. Retired.
Peter D. Wigginton	Democratic	4th	March 4, 1875 – March 3, 1877	San Francisco	Elected in 1875. Lost re-election to Pacheco.
Peter D. Wigginton	Democratic	4th	February 7, 1878 – March 3, 1879	San Francisco	Successfully contested election of Romualdo Pacheco. Retired.
Charles H. Wilson	Democratic	31st	January 3, 1963 – January 3, 1981	Los Angeles	Elected in 1962. Lost renomination to Dymally.
Bob Wilson	Republican	30th	January 3, 1953 – January 3, 1963	San Diego	Elected in 1952. Redistricted to the 36th district.
Bob Wilson	Republican	36th	January 3, 1963 – January 3, 1973	San Diego	Redistricted from the 30th district and re-elected in 1962. Redistricted to the 40th district.
Bob Wilson	Republican	40th	January 3, 1973 – January 3, 1975	San Diego	Redistricted from the 36th district and re-elected in 1972. Redistricted to the 41st district.
Bob Wilson	Republican	41st	January 3, 1975 – January 3, 1981	San Diego	Redistricted from the 40th district and re-elected in 1974. Retired.
Samuel D. Woods	Republican	2nd	December 3, 1900 – March 3, 1903	Stockton	Elected to finish De Vries's term. Retired.
Lynn Woolsey	Democratic	6th	January 3, 1993 – January 3, 2013	Petaluma	Elected in 1992. Retired.
George Washington Wright	Independent	At-large	September 11, 1850 – March 3, 1851	San Francisco	Elected November 13, 1849. Retired.
William J. Wynn	Democratic and Union Labor	5th	March 4, 1903 – March 3, 1905	San Francisco	Elected in 1902. Lost Union Labor nomination and lost re-election to Hayes.
Sam Yorty	Democratic	14th	January 3, 1951 – January 3, 1953	Los Angeles	Elected in 1950. Redistricted to the 26th district.
Sam Yorty	Democratic	26th	January 3, 1953 – January 3, 1955	Los Angeles	Redistricted from the 14th district and re-elected in 1952. Retired to run for U.S. Senator.
J. Arthur Younger	Republican	9th	January 3, 1953 – January 3, 1963	San Mateo	Elected in 1952. Redistricted to the 11th district.
J. Arthur Younger	Republican	11th	January 3, 1963 – June 20, 1967	San Mateo	Redistricted from the 9th district and re-elected in 1962. Died.
Ed Zschau	Republican	12th	January 3, 1983 – January 3, 1987	Los Altos	Elected in 1982. Retired to run for U.S. Senator.

== See also ==
- California's congressional delegations
- California's congressional districts
- List of United States senators from California
