= Judge Wilkinson =

Judge Wilkinson may refer to:

- J. Harvie Wilkinson III (born 1944), judge of the United States Court of Appeals for the Fourth Circuit
- Joseph Biddle Wilkinson Jr. (1845–1915), member of the Board of General Appraisers, predecessor to the United States Court of International Trade

== See also ==
- Nick Browne-Wilkinson, Baron Browne-Wilkinson (1930–2018), justice of the High Court of Justice of England
