= Grove L. Johnson =

American politician (1841–1926)

Grove Johnson
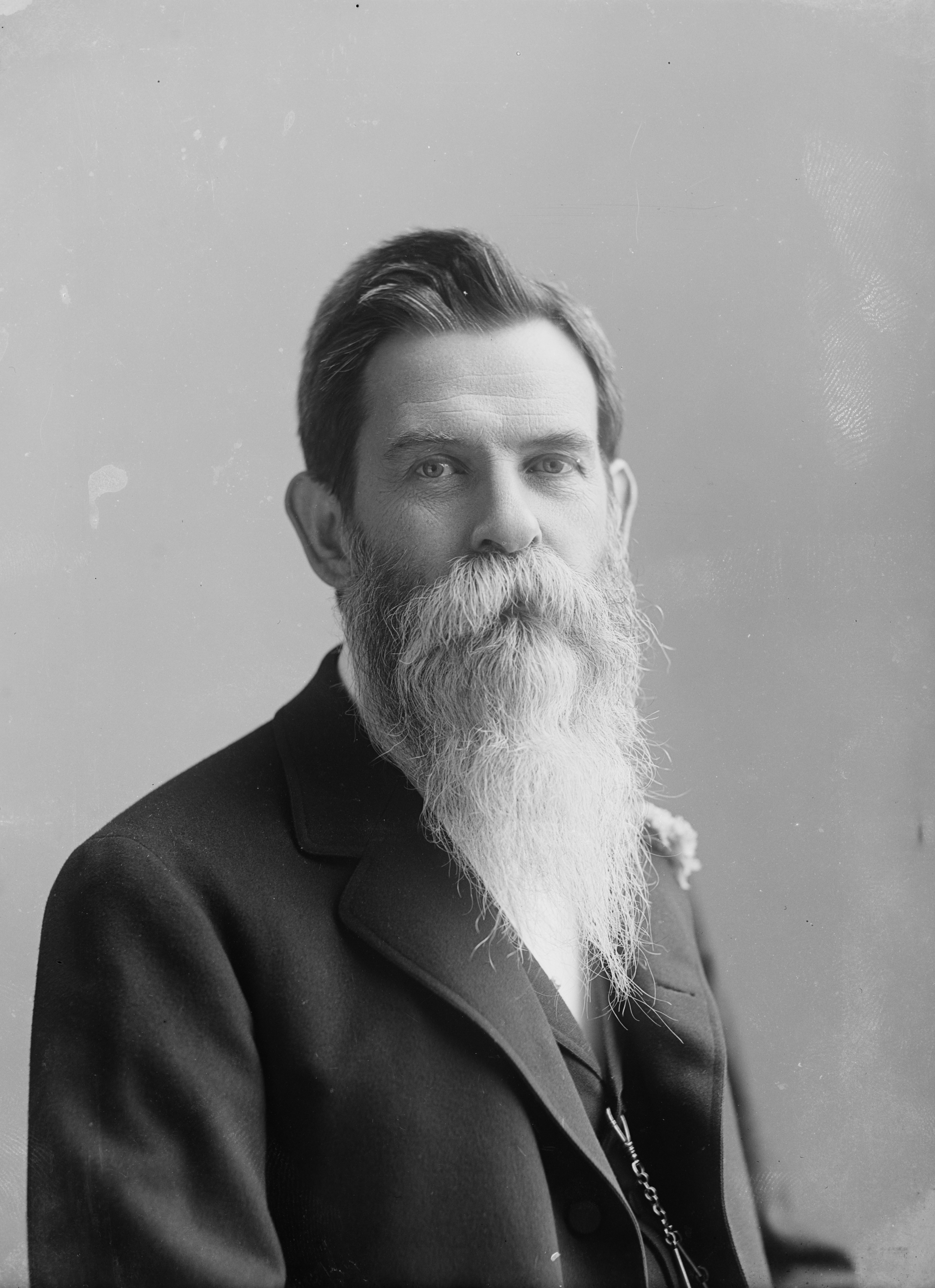
- Portrait by C. M. Bell c. 1895–1897

Member of the U.S. House of Representatives from California's 2nd district
- In office March 4, 1895 – March 3, 1897
- Preceded by: Anthony Caminetti
- Succeeded by: Marion De Vries

Member of the California Senate from the 18th district
- In office January 5, 1880 – January 8, 1883
- Preceded by: Multi-member district
- Succeeded by: Multi-member district

Member of the California State Assembly
- In office January 7, 1907 – January 2, 1911
- Preceded by: Charles O. Busick
- Succeeded by: Charles A. Bliss
- Constituency: 17th district
- In office January 2, 1899 – January 2, 1905
- Preceded by: William M. Sims
- Succeeded by: Charles O. Busick
- Constituency: 20th district (1899–1903); 17th district (1903–1905)
- In office December 3, 1877 – January 5, 1880
- Preceded by: Multi-member district
- Succeeded by: Multi-member district
- Constituency: 18th district

Personal details
- Born: March 27, 1841 Syracuse, New York, U.S.
- Died: February 1, 1926 (aged 84) Sacramento, California, U.S.
- Resting place: Sacramento Historic City Cemetery, Sacramento, California
- Party: Republican (before 1867, after 1875); National Union (1867); Democratic (1867–1875)
- Spouse: Mabel Ann Williamson De Montfredy
- Children: 5, including Hiram
- Profession: Attorney, politician

Grove Lawrence Johnson (March 27, 1841 – February 1, 1926) was an American attorney and politician from California. In addition to serving in both houses of the state legislature, Johnson also served as a United States representative. He was the father of Senator Hiram Warren Johnson.

== Early life ==
Johnson was born in Syracuse, New York, on March 27, 1841. He attended the local schools, studied law, and was admitted to the bar in 1862. While establishing himself as a lawyer, Johnson served on the Syracuse Board of School Commissioners in 1862 and 1863.

In 1863, Johnson was accused of falsifying endorsements on promissory notes worth $250 each. Unable to pay the debt, he hastily departed for Arizona Territory to accept a job arranged by his brother as a quartermaster's clerk for the Union Army. He held this position until the end of the American Civil War in April 1865, when he relocated to California.

== Move to California ==
Johnson moved to California in 1865, and established himself in Sacramento, where he built a successful law practice, sold insurance, and became involved in other business ventures. He was able to satisfy his past debts, and the charges against him in Syracuse were dismissed.

In addition to his legal and business activities, Johnson became involved in local government and politics as a Republican. From 1866 to 1879, Johnson was clerk of the Sacramento County Board of Swamp Land Commissioners, the body charged with planning and overseeing development and reclamation of marshes and bogs throughout the county. In 1867 he was the National Union Party candidate for county auditor; accused of illegal campaign practices for allegedly adding the names of non-existent voters to the rolls so he could cast ballots for himself, Johnson pleaded no contest and withdrew from the campaign. From 1868 to 1871 he was a clerk in the office of the state Surveyor General.

== Political career ==
After his unsuccessful 1867 campaign, Johnson became a member of the Democratic Party. He served on the state Democratic Central Committee, and made unsuccessful runs for the California State Senate in 1871 and 1875. In his 1871 campaign, several ballots were discovered to have been tampered with; someone used disappearing ink to cause the name of Johnson's opponent to disappear and Johnson's to appear after the ballots had been marked. Election officials observed the alterations and confiscated the suspect ballots, but no charges were brought against Johnson.

Following his 1875 loss, Johnson rejoined the Republicans. He won a seat in the California State Assembly in 1877, serving until 1880. In 1879 he was elected to the State Senate, and he served from 1880 to 1883. Johnson was also a delegate to the state Republican Conventions in 1884, 1888, 1892, and 1908, and was a delegate to the 1896 Republican National Convention.

In 1894, Johnson was a successful Republican candidate for the United States House of Representatives. He served in the Fifty-fourth Congress (March 4, 1895 – March 3, 1897), and was an unsuccessful candidate for reelection in 1896.

== Later career ==
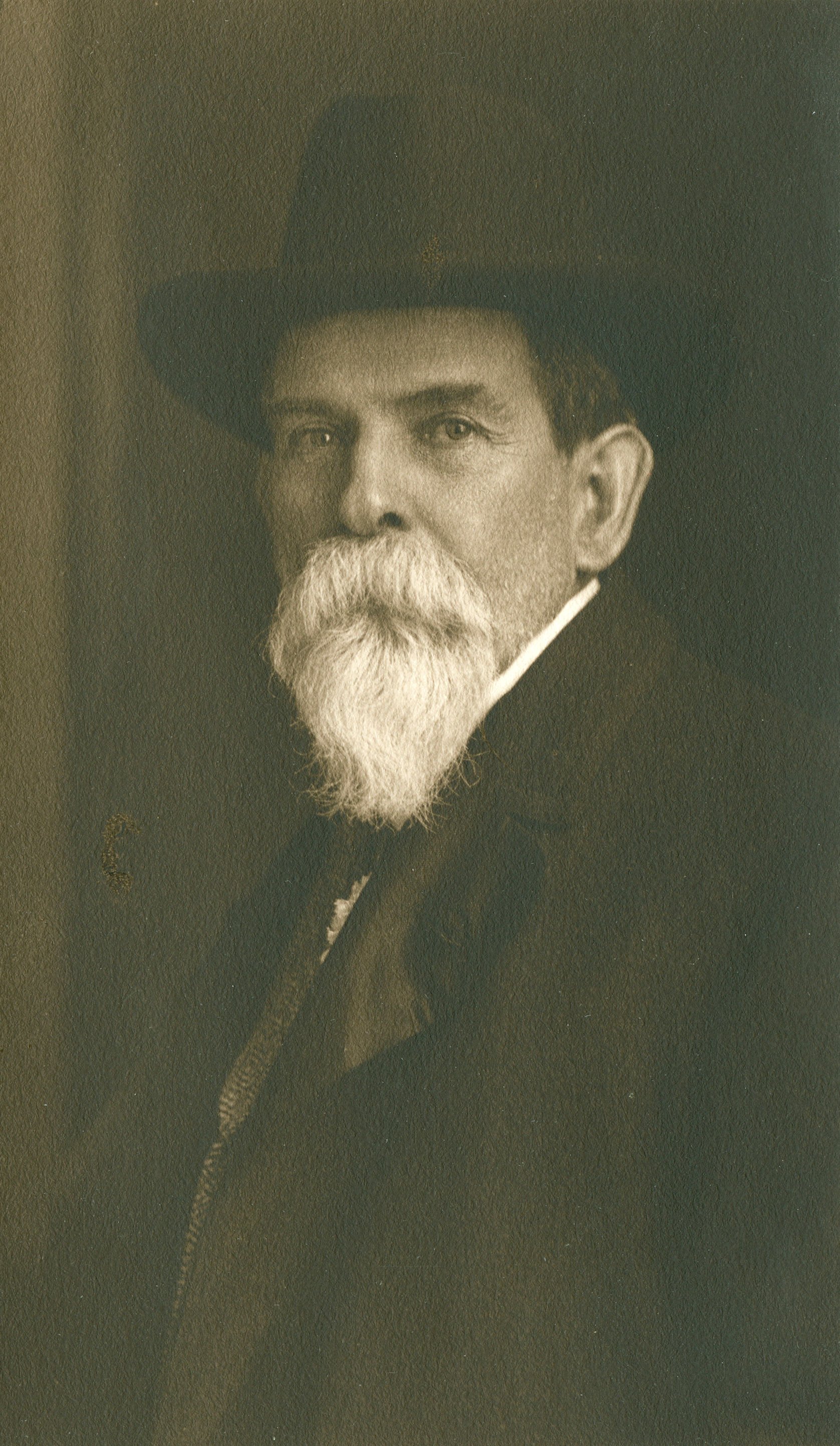
Portrait by Grace Hubley, 1909

After losing reelection to Congress, Johnson resumed the practice of law in Sacramento, California. In 1898 he was again elected to the California Assembly, and he served from 1899 to 1905. He lost his bid for reelection in 1904, but in 1906 he was elected to another term in the Assembly, and served from 1907 to 1911. He lost his campaign for reelection in 1910.

In 1921, Johnson was appointed Receiver of Public Moneys at the United States Land Office in Sacramento, and he served until the position was eliminated in 1925.

== Death and burial ==
He died in Sacramento, California, February 1, 1926, and was interred at Sacramento Historic City Cemetery.

== Family ==
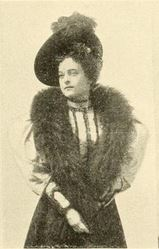
Mabel Ann Williamson Johnson

In 1846, Johnson married Mabel Ann Williamson De Montfredy, a native of Onondaga County, New York. Her mother was a member of the Van Cortlandt family, who were among the early Dutch settlers of New York. Grove and Mabel Johnson were the parents of three daughters and two sons.

== Electoral results ==
1894 United States House of Representatives elections in California, 2nd district
Party	Candidate	Votes	%
Republican	Grove L. Johnson	19,302	43.0
Democratic	Anthony Caminetti (incumbent)	15,732	35.1
Populist	Burdell Cornell	8,946	20.0
Prohibition	Elam Briggs	866	1.9
Total votes		44,846	100.0
Turnout			
Republican gain from Democratic			

1896 United States House of Representatives elections in California, 2nd district
Party	Candidate	Votes	%
Democratic	Marion De Vries	24,434	55.5
Republican	Grove L. Johnson (incumbent)	18,613	42.3
Prohibition	F. E. Coulter	974	2.2
Total votes		44,021	100.0
Turnout			
Democratic gain from Republican			

== Sources ==
=== Internet ===
- "Sacramento Historic City Cemetery Burial Index" (PDF). Old City Cemetery Committee. 2005. Archived from the original (PDF) on February 5, 2018.

=== Books ===
- Weatherson, Michael A.; Bochin, Hal (1995). Hiram Johnson: Political Revivalist. Lanham, MD: University Press of America. ISBN 978-0-8191-9904-1.
- United States Congress (2005). Biographical Directory of the United States Congress, 1774-2005. Washington, DC: US Government Printing Office. ISBN 978-0-16-073176-1.

U.S. House of Representatives
Preceded by Anthony Caminetti	Member of the U.S. House of Representatives from California's 2nd congressional district 1895–1897	Succeeded by Marion De Vries
