= Robert Morris Montgomery =

American judge (1849–1920)

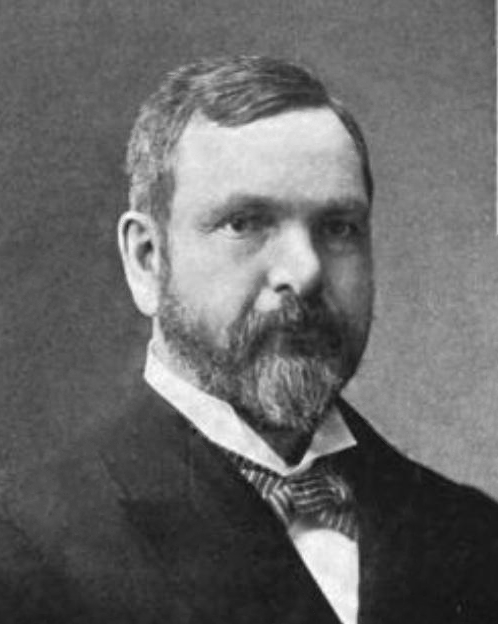
Robert Morris Montgomery

Presiding Judge of the United States Court of Customs Appeals
- In office March 30, 1910 – June 27, 1920
- Appointed by: William Howard Taft
- Preceded by: Seat established by 36 Stat. 11
- Succeeded by: Marion De Vries

Personal details
- Born: Robert Morris Montgomery; May 12, 1849 Eaton Rapids, Michigan, U.S.
- Died: June 27, 1920 (aged 71) Eaton Rapids, Michigan, U.S.
- Education: read law

Robert Morris Montgomery (May 12, 1849 – June 27, 1920) was a justice of the Michigan Supreme Court and a Presiding Judge of the United States Court of Customs Appeals.

== Education and career ==
Born on May 12, 1849, in Eaton Rapids, Michigan, Montgomery read law in 1870. He served in the United States Army Seventh Michigan Cavalry in 1864, during the American Civil War. He entered private practice in Pentwater, Michigan from 1871 to 1873. He was an assistant assessor of internal revenue for the State of Michigan in 1873. He was prosecutor for Oceana County, Michigan from 1873 to 1877. He returned to private practice in Grand Rapids, Michigan in 1877. He was an Assistant United States Attorney for the Western District of Michigan from 1877 to 1881. He was a Judge of the Michigan Circuit Court for the Seventeenth Judicial Circuit from 1881 to 1888. He resumed private practice in Grand Rapids from 1888 to 1891. He was a justice of the Michigan Supreme Court from 1892 to 1910, serving as chief justice from 1900 to 1901, and in 1910.

== Federal judicial service ==
Montgomery was nominated by President William Howard Taft on March 9, 1910, to the United States Court of Customs Appeals (later the United States Court of Customs and Patent Appeals), to the new Presiding Judge seat authorized by 36 Stat. 11. He was confirmed by the United States Senate on March 30, 1910, and received his commission the same day. His service terminated on June 27, 1920, due to his death in Eaton Rapids.

== Sources ==
- "Montgomery, Robert Morris - Federal Judicial Center". www.fjc.gov.
- "Robert Montgomery". www.micourthistory.org.

Legal offices
| Preceded by Seat established by 36 Stat. 11 | Presiding Judge of the United States Court of Customs Appeals; 1910–1920 | Succeeded by Marion De Vries |
