= Samuel D. Woods =

American politician (1845–1915)

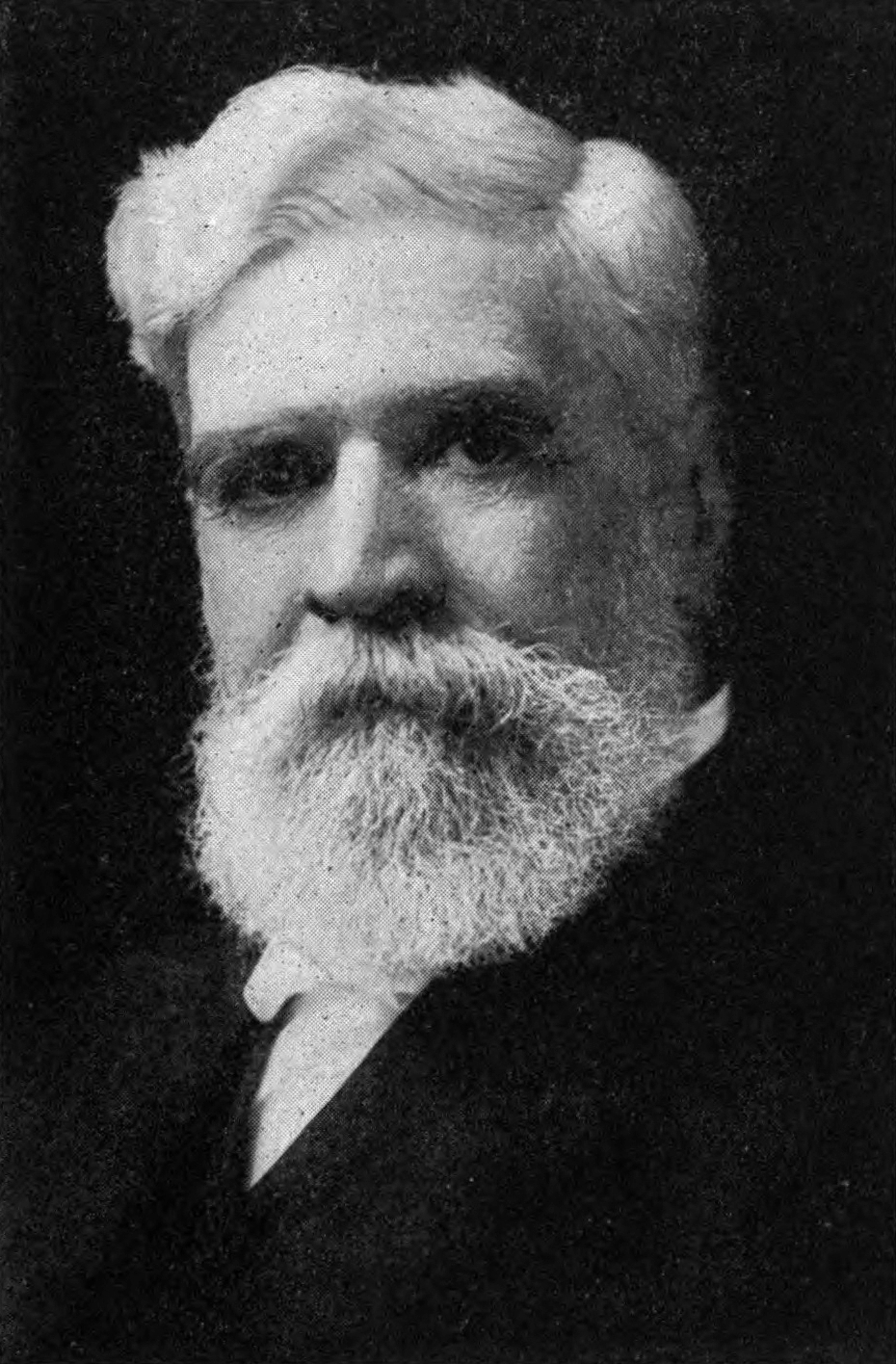
- Woods c. 1915

Member of the U.S. House of Representatives from California's 2nd district
- In office December 3, 1900 – March 3, 1903
- Preceded by: Marion De Vries
- Succeeded by: Theodore Arlington Bell

Personal details
- Born: Samuel Davis Woods; September 19, 1845 Mount Pleasant, Tennessee, U.S.
- Died: December 24, 1915 (aged 70) San Francisco, California, U.S.
- Resting place: Mount Olivet Cemetery, California
- Party: Republican
- Profession: lawyer, politician

Samuel Davis Woods (September 19, 1845 – December 24, 1915) was an American lawyer and politician who served as a U.S. representative from California from 1900 to 1903, as a member of the Republican Party.

== Biography ==
Born in Mount Pleasant, Tennessee, Woods moved with his parents to Stockton, California, in February 1850. He attended public schools and studied law. He was admitted to the California bar in April 1875 and engaged in practice in Stockton and in the city and county of San Francisco.

=== Congress ===
Woods was elected as a Republican to the Fifty-sixth Congress to fill the vacancy caused by the resignation of Marion De Vries. He was reelected to the Fifty-seventh Congress and served from December 3, 1900, to March 3, 1903. He was not a candidate for reelection in 1902 to the Fifty-eighth Congress.

=== Later career and death ===
He resumed the practice of law in San Francisco, California, and died there December 24, 1915. He was interred in Mount Olivet Cemetery, California.

== Electoral history ==
United States House of Representatives special election, November 6, 1900
Party	Candidate	Votes	%
Republican	Samuel D. Woods	N/A	51.0
Democratic	J. D. Sproul	N/A	49.0
Total votes		N/A	100.0
Turnout			
Republican gain from Democratic			

1900 United States House of Representatives elections in California, 2nd district
Party	Candidate	Votes	%
Republican	Samuel D. Woods	23,019	50.4
Democratic	J. D. Sproul	21,851	47.9
Social Democratic	W. F. Lockwood	402	0.9
Prohibition	W. H. Barron	371	0.8
Total votes		45,643	100.0
Turnout			
Republican gain from Democratic			

U.S. House of Representatives
Preceded by Marion De Vries	Member of the U.S. House of Representatives from California's 2nd congressional district 1900–1903	Succeeded by Theodore Arlington Bell
