= Samuel G. Hilborn =

American politician from California

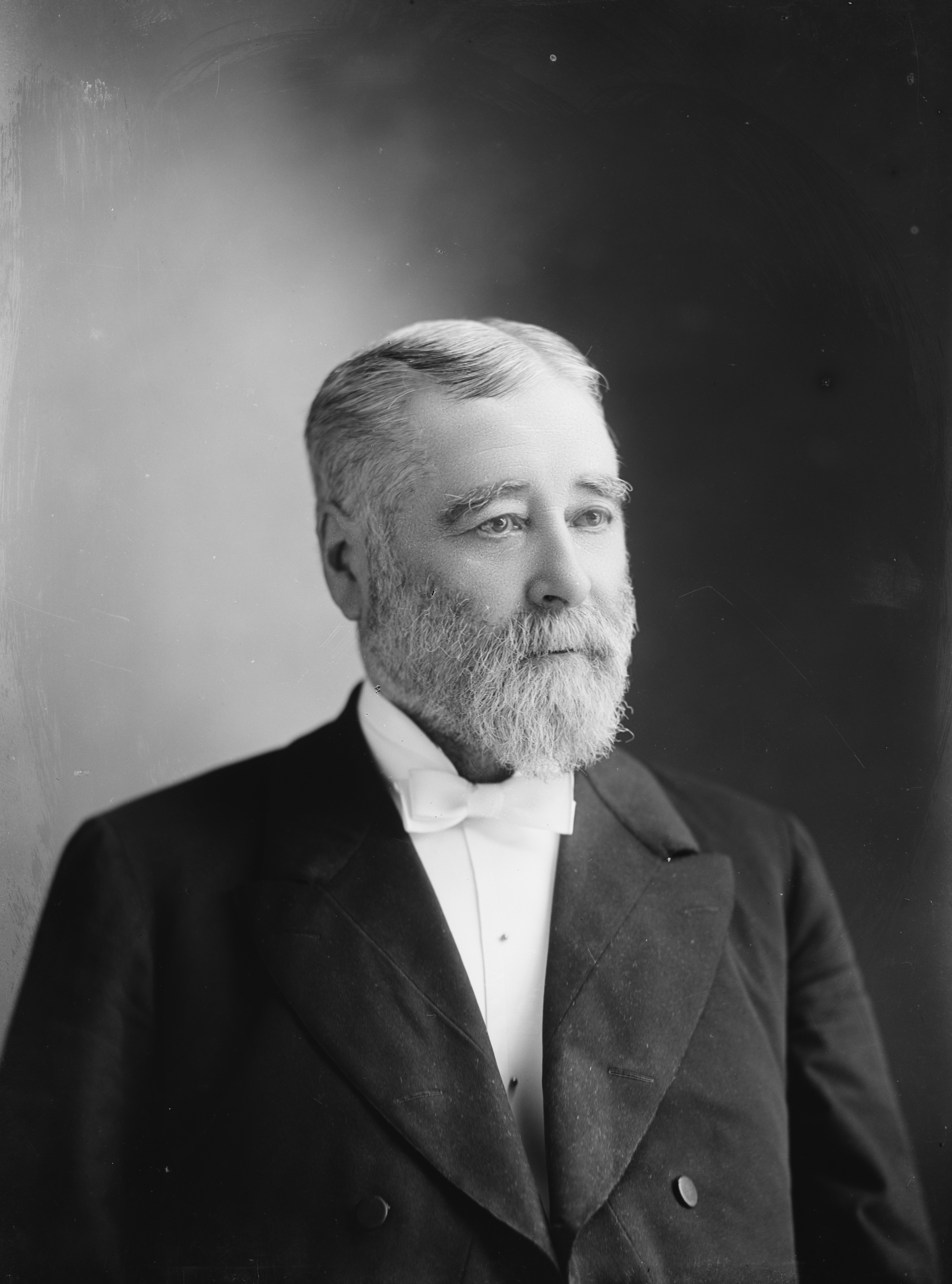
- Portrait by C. M. Bell, c. 1894–1899

Member of the U.S. House of Representatives from California's 3rd district
- In office March 4, 1895 – March 3, 1899
- Preceded by: Warren B. English
- Succeeded by: Victor H. Metcalf
- In office December 5, 1892 – April 4, 1894
- Preceded by: Joseph McKenna
- Succeeded by: Warren B. English

Delegate to the Second Constitutional Convention of California
- In office September 28, 1878 – March 3, 1879
- Preceded by: Office established
- Succeeded by: Office abolished
- Constituency: Solano

Member of the California Senate
- In office December 6, 1875 – January 5, 1880
- Preceded by: Noble Martin
- Succeeded by: Multi-member district
- Constituency: 20th district (1875–1877); 19th district (1877–1880)

Personal details
- Born: December 9, 1834 Minot, Maine, U.S.
- Died: April 19, 1899 (aged 64) Washington, D.C., U.S.
- Resting place: Sunrise Memorial Cemetery; Vallejo, California, U.S.
- Party: Republican

Samuel Greeley Hilborn (December 9, 1834 – April 19, 1899) was an American lawyer and politician who served as a U.S. Representative from California in the late 19th century.

== Early life ==
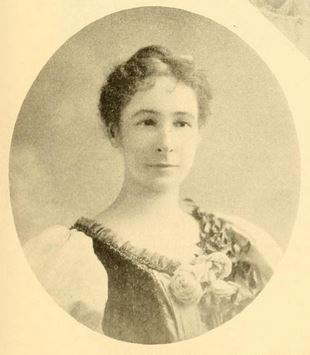
Grace Hilborn, daughter of Samuel G. Hilborn

Born in Minot, Androscoggin (then Cumberland) County, Maine, Hilborn attended the common schools, Hebron Academy, and Gould's Academy, Bethel, Maine, and was graduated from Tufts College, Medford, Massachusetts, in 1859. He studied law and was admitted to the bar in 1861. He moved to California, Vallejo, Solano County, and engaged in the practice of law.

== Career ==
Hilborn served in the State Senate from 1875 to 1880. He served as member of the constitutional convention in 1879. He moved to San Francisco, California, in 1883. He was appointed by President Arthur United States district attorney for the district of California and served from 1883 to 1886. He moved to Oakland in 1887 and continued the practice of his profession.

Hilborn was elected as a Republican to the Fifty-second Congress to fill the vacancy caused by the resignation of Joseph McKenna. He served from December 5, 1892, until April 4, 1894, when he was succeeded by Warren B. English, who contested his election.

Hilborn was elected to the Fifty-fourth and Fifty-fifth Congresses (March 4, 1895 – March 3, 1899). He was an unsuccessful candidate for renomination in 1898.

== Later life and death ==
He lived in retirement until his death in Washington, D.C., April 19, 1899. He was interred in Rock Creek Cemetery and later re-interred in Sunrise Memorial Cemetery in Vallejo, California.

== Electoral history ==
1892 United States House of Representatives elections in California, District 3
| Party | Candidate | Votes | % |
|---|---|---|---|
| Republican | Samuel G. Hilborn | 13,163 | 43.2 |
| Democratic | Warren B. English | 13,138 | 43.1 |
| Populist | J. L. Lyon | 3,495 | 11.5 |
| Prohibition | L. B. Scranton | 671 | 2.2 |
| Total votes | | 30,467 | 100.0 |
| Republican hold | | | |

1894 United States House of Representatives elections in California, District 3
| Party | Candidate | Votes | % |
|---|---|---|---|
| Republican | Samuel G. Hilborn | 15,795 | 45.5 |
| Democratic | Warren B. English (Incumbent) | 13,103 | 37.8 |
| Populist | W. A. Vann | 5,162 | 14.9 |
| Prohibition | L. B. Scranton | 637 | 1.8 |
| Total votes | | 34,697 | 100.0 |
| Republican gain from Democratic | | | |

1896 United States House of Representatives elections in California, District 3
| Party | Candidate | Votes | % |
|---|---|---|---|
| Republican | Samuel Hilborn (Incumbent) | 19,778 | 54.0 |
| Democratic | Warren B. English | 16,119 | 44.0 |
| Socialist | John H. Eustice | 387 | 1.1 |
| Prohibition | W. Shafer | 327 | 0.9 |
| Total votes | | 36,611 | 100.0 |
| Republican hold | | | |

U.S. House of Representatives
| Preceded by Joseph McKenna | Member of the U.S. House of Representatives from California's 3rd congressional district 1892–1894 | Succeeded by Warren B. English |
| Preceded by Warren B. English | Member of the U.S. House of Representatives from California's 3rd congressional district 1895–1899 | Succeeded by Victor H. Metcalf |
