= Marion De Vries =

American judge and politician (1865-1939)

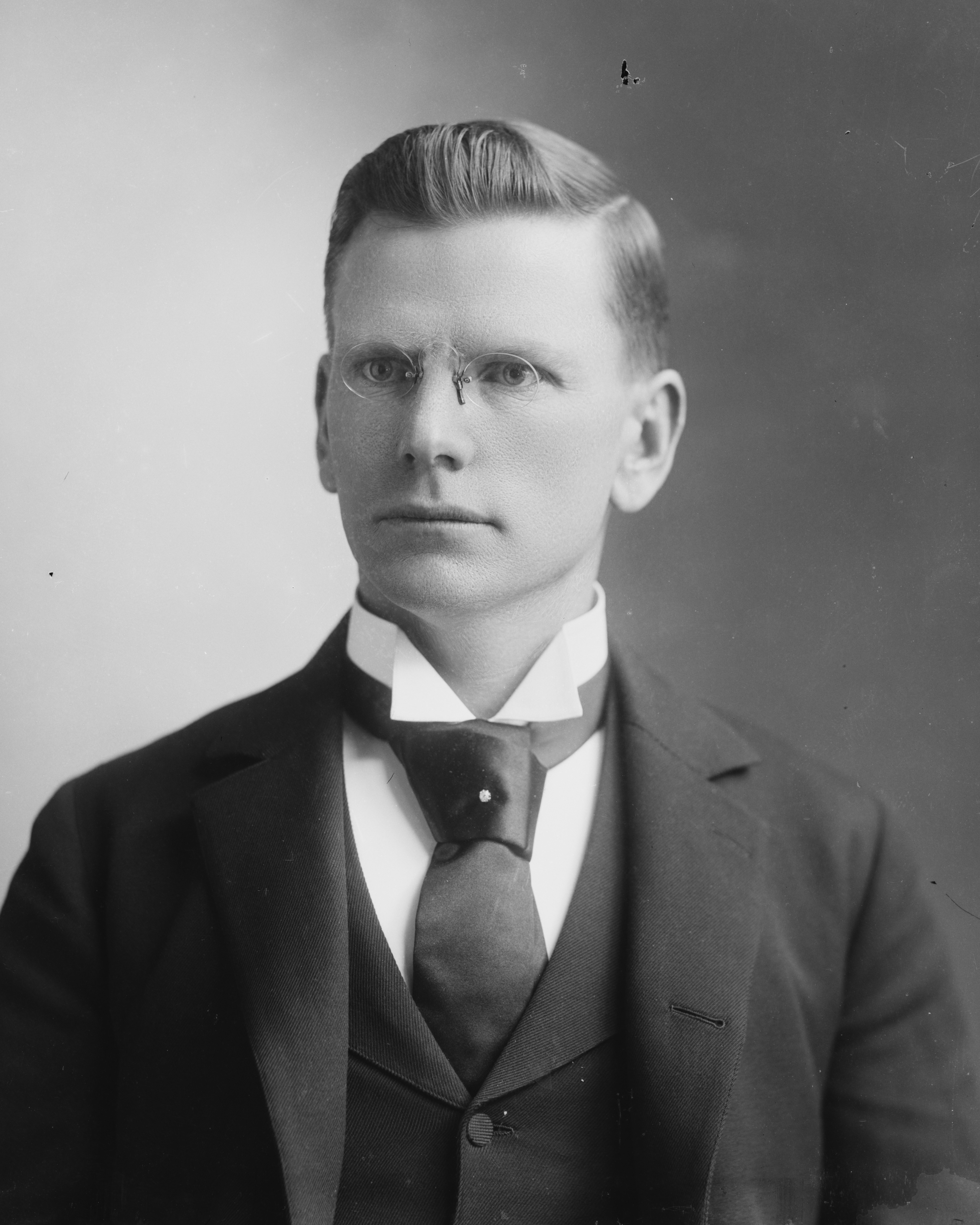
- Portrait by C. M. Bell c. 1897–1900

Presiding Judge of the United States Court of Customs Appeals
- In office June 28, 1921 – October 31, 1922
- Appointed by: Warren G. Harding
- Preceded by: Robert Morris Montgomery
- Succeeded by: George Ewing Martin

Associate Judge of the United States Court of Customs Appeals
- In office March 30, 1910 – June 28, 1921
- Appointed by: William Howard Taft
- Preceded by: Seat established by 36 Stat. 11
- Succeeded by: Oscar E. Bland

President of the Board of General Appraisers
- In office 1906–1910
- Preceded by: Israel F. Fischer
- Succeeded by: Henderson M. Somerville

Member of the Board of General Appraisers
- In office June 9, 1900 – April 2, 1910
- Appointed by: William McKinley
- Preceded by: Joseph Biddle Wilkinson Jr.
- Succeeded by: Samuel B. Cooper

Member of the U.S. House of Representatives from California's 2nd district
- In office March 4, 1897 – August 20, 1900
- Preceded by: Grove L. Johnson
- Succeeded by: Samuel D. Woods

Personal details
- Born: August 15, 1865 Woodbridge, California, U.S.
- Died: September 11, 1939 (aged 74) Woodbridge, California, U.S.
- Party: Democratic
- Education: San Joaquin Valley College (Ph.B.); University of Michigan Law School (LL.B.)

Military service
- Allegiance: United States
- Branch/service: California National Guard
- Years of service: 1891–1893
- Rank: Major
- Unit: 3rd Brigade

Marion De Vries (August 15, 1865 – September 11, 1939) was an American lawyer, politician, and jurist who served as a United States representative from California, a Member and President of the Board of General Appraisers and an Associate Judge and later Presiding Judge of the United States Court of Customs Appeals.

== Education and career ==
Born on August 15, 1865, on a ranch near Woodbridge, San Joaquin County, California, De Vries attended the public schools. He received a Bachelor of Philosophy degree in 1886 from San Joaquin Valley College and a Bachelor of Laws in 1888 from University of Michigan Law School. He was admitted to the bar and entered private practice in Stockton, California from 1889 to 1900. He was an assistant district attorney for San Joaquin County from January 1893 to February 1897.

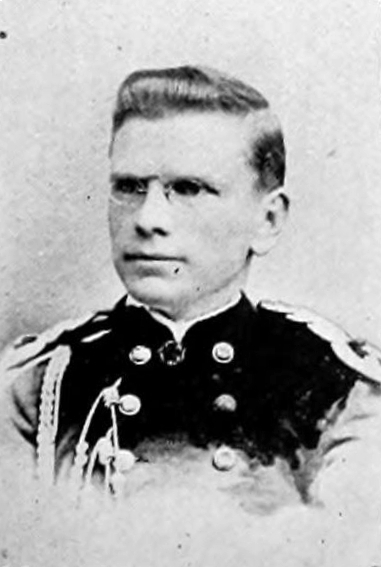
Major De Vries in uniform c. 1891 (Note: Photograph appears to be doctored. Note abnormally large head and collar misaligned with neck.)

De Vries served in the California National Guard from 1891 to 1893, rising to the rank of major and signal officer on the staff of general James Budd.

== Congressional service ==
De Vries was elected as a Democrat to the United States House of Representatives of the 55th and 56th United States Congresses and served from March 4, 1897, to August 20, 1900, when he resigned to accept a federal judgeship.

== Federal judicial service ==
De Vries received a recess appointment from President William McKinley on June 9, 1900, to a seat vacated by Joseph Biddle Wilkinson Jr. He was nominated to the same position by President McKinley on December 5, 1900. He was confirmed by the United States Senate on December 10, 1900. He served as President from 1906 to 1910. His service terminated on April 2, 1910, due to his elevation to the United States Court of Customs Appeals.

De Vries was nominated by President William Howard Taft on March 9, 1910, to the United States Court of Customs Appeals (later the United States Court of Customs and Patent Appeals), to a new Associate Judge seat authorized by 36 Stat. 11. He was confirmed by the Senate on March 30, 1910, and received his commission on March 30, 1910. His service terminated on June 28, 1921, due to his elevation to Presiding Judge of the same court.

De Vries was nominated by President Warren G. Harding on June 23, 1921, to the Presiding Judge seat on the United States Court of Customs Appeals vacated by Presiding Judge Robert Morris Montgomery. He was confirmed by the Senate on June 28, 1921, and received his commission the same day. His service terminated on October 31, 1922, due to his resignation.

== Later career and death ==
After his resignation from the federal bench, De Vries returned to private practice in Washington, D.C., and New York City, New York, from 1922 to 1939. He died on September 11, 1939, on his ranch near Woodbridge. He was interred in the family plot on the De Vries Ranch.

== Electoral history ==
1896 United States House of Representatives elections in California, 2nd district
Party	Candidate	Votes	%
Democratic	Marion De Vries	24,434	55.5
Republican	Grove L. Johnson (incumbent)	18,613	42.3
Prohibition	F. E. Coulter	974	2.2
Total votes		44,021	100.0
Turnout			
Democratic gain from Republican			

1898 United States House of Representatives elections in California, 2nd district
Party	Candidate	Votes	%
Democratic	Marion De Vries (incumbent)	25,196	55.3
Republican	Frank D. Ryan	20,400	44.7
Total votes		45,596	100.0
Turnout			
Democratic hold			

== Sources ==
- "Marion De Vries". Biographical Directory of the United States Congress.

U.S. House of Representatives
Preceded by Grove L. Johnson	Member of the United States House of Representatives from California's 2nd congressional district 1897–1900	Succeeded by Samuel D. Woods
Legal offices
Preceded by Joseph Biddle Wilkinson Jr.	Member of the Board of General Appraisers; 1900–1910	Succeeded by Samuel B. Cooper
Preceded by Israel F. Fischer	President of the Board of General Appraisers; 1906–1910	Succeeded by Henderson M. Somerville
Preceded by Seat established by 36 Stat. 11	Associate Judge of the United States Court of Customs Appeals; 1910–1921	Succeeded by Oscar E. Bland
Preceded by Robert Morris Montgomery	Presiding Judge of the United States Court of Customs Appeals; 1921–1922	Succeeded by George Ewing Martin
