= Joseph Biddle Wilkinson Jr. =

American judge

Member of the Board of General Appraisers
- In office July 16, 1890 – December 15, 1899
- Appointed by: Benjamin Harrison
- Preceded by: Seat established by 26 Stat. 131
- Succeeded by: Marion De Vries

Personal details
- Born: Joseph Biddle Wilkinson Jr. February 20, 1845 Plaquemines Parish, Louisiana, U.S.
- Died: October 23, 1915 (aged 70) Waterproof, Louisiana, U.S.
- Spouse: Lydia Deloris Duval (1847–1937)
- Children: Lilla (1867–1955); Joseph Biddle (1870–1935); Marcellus Clement (1879–1967); Violet; Mae
- Parents: Dr Joseph Biddle Wilkinson (1817–1902) (father); Josephine Osborne Stark Wilkinson (1823–1908) (mother)
- Relatives: James Wilkinson ((great-grandfather)); Theodore S. Wilkinson (brother); Theodore Stark Wilkinson (nephew); Biddle family (great-great-grandmother)
- Education: Virginia Military Institute

Joseph Biddle Wilkinson Jr. (February 20, 1845 – October 23, 1915) was a member of the Board of General Appraisers.

== Education and career ==
He was born on February 20, 1845, in Pointe Celeste Plantation, Plaquemines Parish, Louisiana, the eldest of seven boys born to Dr. Joseph Biddle and Josephine Osborne (nee Stark) Wilkinson.

Wilkinson attended the Virginia Military Institute and served as a lieutenant in the Confederate States Army from 1861 to 1865, during the American Civil War. After the war, he was a planter in Plaquemines Parish from 1865 to 1885. He served as Chief Clerk for the New Orleans Customs House from 1866 to 1890.

== Federal judicial service ==
Wilkinson was nominated by President Benjamin Harrison on July 2, 1890, to the Board of General Appraisers, to a new seat created by 26 Stat. 131. He was confirmed by the United States Senate on July 16, 1890, and received his commission the same day. His service terminated on December 15, 1899, due to his resignation. He was succeeded by Marion De Vries.

== Death ==
Wilkinson died on October 23, 1915, in Myrtle Grove Plantation, Louisiana.

== Family ==
Wilkinson was the great-grandson of James Wilkinson.

== Sources ==
- "Board of General Appraisers: Wilkinson, Joseph Biddle Jr. - Federal Judicial Center". www.fjc.gov.

Legal offices
Preceded by Seat established by 26 Stat. 131	Member of the Board of General Appraisers; 1890–1899	Succeeded by Marion De Vries
