= 1896 United States House of Representatives elections in California =

- November 3, 1896

All 7 California seats to the United States House of Representatives
| | Majority party | Minority party | Third party |
|---|---|---|---|
| Party | Republican | Democratic | Populist |
| Last election | 6 | 1 | 0 |
| Seats won | 3 | 2 | 2 |
| Seat change | ▼3 | ▲1 | ▲2 |
| Popular vote | 128,941 | 86,449 | 53,662 |
| Percentage | 46.4% | 31.1% | 19.3% |
- Election results by district.

The United States House of Representatives elections in California, 1896 was an election for California's delegation to the United States House of Representatives, which occurred as part of the general election of the House of Representatives on November 3, 1896. Republicans lost one seat to the Democrats and two to the Populists.

== Overview ==
United States House of Representatives elections in California, 1896
| Party | Votes | Percentage | Seats | +/– |
|---|---|---|---|---|
| Republican | 128,941 | 46.4% | 3 | -3 |
| Democratic | 86,449 | 31.1% | 2 | +1 |
| Populist | 53,662 | 19.3% | 2 | +2 |
| Prohibition | 4,251 | 1.5% | 0 | 0 |
| Socialist Labor | 2,654 | 1.0% | 0 | 0 |
| Independent | 2,139 | 0.8% | 0 | 0 |
| Totals | 278,096 | 100.0% | 7 | — |

== Delegation Composition ==
| Pre-election | Seats |
| Republican-Held | 6 |
| Democratic-Held | 1 |

| Post-election | Seats |
| Republican-Held | 3 |
| Democratic-Held | 2 |
| Populist-Held | 2 |

== Results ==
=== District 1 ===
California's 1st congressional district election, 1896
| Party | Candidate | Votes | % |
|---|---|---|---|
| Republican | John All Barham (incumbent) | 17,826 | 49.7 |
| Democratic | Fletcher A. Cutler | 16,328 | 45.5 |
| Populist | George W. Monteith | 1,497 | 4.2 |
| Prohibition | B. F. Taylor | 249 | 0.7 |
| Total votes | | 35,900 | 100.0 |
| Turnout | | | |
| Republican hold | | | |

=== District 2 ===
California's 2nd congressional district election, 1896
| Party | Candidate | Votes | % |
|---|---|---|---|
| Democratic | Marion De Vries | 24,434 | 55.5 |
| Republican | Grove L. Johnson (incumbent) | 18,613 | 42.3 |
| Prohibition | F. E. Coulter | 974 | 2.2 |
| Total votes | | 44,021 | 100.0 |
| Turnout | | | |
| Democratic gain from Republican | | | |

=== District 3 ===
California's 3rd congressional district election, 1896
| Party | Candidate | Votes | % |
|---|---|---|---|
| Republican | Samuel G. Hilborn (incumbent) | 19,778 | 54.0 |
| Democratic | Warren B. English | 16,119 | 44.0 |
| Socialist Labor | John H. Eustice | 387 | 1.1 |
| Prohibition | W. Shafer | 327 | 0.9 |
| Total votes | | 36,611 | 100.0 |
| Turnout | | | |
| Republican hold | | | |

=== District 4 ===
California's 4th congressional district election, 1896
| Party | Candidate | Votes | % |
|---|---|---|---|
| Democratic | James G. Maguire (incumbent) | 19,074 | 61.0 |
| Republican | Thomas B. O'Brien | 10,940 | 35.0 |
| Socialist Labor | E. T. Kingsley | 968 | 3.0 |
| Prohibition | Joseph Rowell | 299 | 1.0 |
| Total votes | | 31,281 | 100.0 |
| Turnout | | | |
| Democratic hold | | | |

=== District 5 ===
California's 5th congressional district election, 1896
| Party | Candidate | Votes | % |
|---|---|---|---|
| Republican | Eugene F. Loud (incumbent) | 19,351 | 48.6 |
| Democratic | Joseph P. Kelly | 10,494 | 26.3 |
| Populist | A. B. Kinne | 8,825 | 22.2 |
| Socialist Labor | Henry Daniels | 757 | 1.9 |
| Prohibition | T. H. Lawson | 404 | 1.0 |
| Total votes | | 39,831 | 100.0 |
| Turnout | | | |
| Republican hold | | | |

=== District 6 ===
California's 6th congressional district election, 1896
| Party | Candidate | Votes | % |
|---|---|---|---|
| Populist | Charles A. Barlow | 24,157 | 48.9 |
| Republican | James McLachlan (incumbent) | 23,494 | 47.6 |
| Prohibition | Henry Clay Needham | 1,196 | 2.4 |
| Socialist Labor | Job Harriman | 542 | 1.1 |
| Total votes | | 49,389 | 100.0 |
| Turnout | | | |
| Populist gain from Republican | | | |

=== District 7 ===
California's 7th congressional district election, 1896
| Party | Candidate | Votes | % |
|---|---|---|---|
| Populist | Curtis H. Castle | 19,183 | 46.7 |
| Republican | William W. Bowers (incumbent) | 18,939 | 46.1 |
| Independent | William H. "Billy" Carlson | 2,139 | 5.2 |
| Prohibition | James W. Webb | 802 | 2.0 |
| Total votes | | 41,063 | 100.0 |
| Turnout | | | |
| Populist gain from Republican | | | |

== See also ==
- 55th United States Congress
- Political party strength in California
- Political party strength in U.S. states
- United States House of Representatives elections, 1896
