= 1894 United States House of Representatives elections in California =

- November 6, 1894

All 7 California seats to the United States House of Representatives
	Majority party	Minority party	Third party
Party	Republican	Democratic	Populist
Last election	3	3	1
Seats before	2	4	1
Seats won	6	1	0
Seat change	▲4	▼3	▼1
Popular vote	106,972	92,911	55,289
Percentage	39.8%	34.6%	20.6%
- Election results by district.

The United States House of Representatives elections in California, 1894 was an election for California's delegation to the United States House of Representatives, which occurred as part of the general election of the House of Representatives on November 6, 1894. Republicans picked up three Democratic-held districts and the lone Populist open seat.

== Overview ==
United States House of Representatives elections in California, 1894
Party	Votes	Percentage	Seats	+/–
Republican	106,972	39.8%	6	+3
Democratic	92,911	34.6%	1	-2
Populist	55,289	20.6%	0	-1
Prohibition	13,281	4.9%	0	0
Totals	268,453	100.0%	7	—

== Delegation Composition ==
Pre-election	Seats
Democratic-Held	4
Republican-Held	2
Populist-Held	1

Post-election	Seats
Republican-Held	6
Democratic-Held	1

== Results ==
=== District 1 ===
California's 1st congressional district election, 1894
Party	Candidate	Votes	%
Republican	John All Barham	15,101	41.1
Democratic	Thomas J. Geary (incumbent)	13,570	37.0
Populist	Roger F. Grigsby	7,246	19.7
Prohibition	J. R. Gregory	790	2.2
Total votes		36,707	100.0
Turnout			
Republican gain from Democratic			

=== District 2 ===
California's 2nd congressional district election, 1894
Party	Candidate	Votes	%
Republican	Grove L. Johnson	19,302	43.0
Democratic	Anthony Caminetti (incumbent)	15,732	35.1
Populist	Burdett Cornell	8,946	20.0
Prohibition	Elam Briggs	866	1.9
Total votes		44,846	100.0
Turnout			
Republican gain from Democratic			

=== District 3 ===
California's 3rd congressional district election, 1894
Party	Candidate	Votes	%
Republican	Samuel G. Hilborn	15,795	45.5
Democratic	Warren B. English (incumbent)	13,103	37.8
Populist	W. A. Vann	5,162	14.9
Prohibition	L. B. Scranton	637	1.8
Total votes		34,697	100.0
Turnout			
Republican gain from Democratic			

=== District 4 ===
California's 4th congressional district election, 1894
Party	Candidate	Votes	%
Democratic	James G. Maguire (incumbent)	14,748	48.3
Republican	Thomas Bowles Shannon	9,785	32.0
Populist	B. K. Collier	5,627	18.4
Prohibition	Joseph Rowell	388	1.3
Total votes		30,548	100.0
Turnout			
Democratic hold			

=== District 5 ===
California's 5th congressional district election, 1894
Party	Candidate	Votes	%
Republican	Eugene F. Loud (incumbent)	13,379	36.8
Democratic	Joseph P. Kelly	8,384	23.0
Populist	James T. Rogers	7,820	21.5
Prohibition	James Denman	6,811	18.7
Total votes		36,394	100.0
Turnout			
Republican hold			

=== District 6 ===
California's 6th congressional district election, 1894
Party	Candidate	Votes	%
Republican	James McLachlan	18,746	44.3
Democratic	George S. Patton	11,693	27.6
Populist	W. C. Bowman	9,769	23.1
Prohibition	J. E. McComas	2,120	5.0
Total votes		42,328	100.0
Turnout			
Republican gain from Populist			

=== District 7 ===
California's 7th congressional district election, 1894
Party	Candidate	Votes	%
Republican	William W. Bowers (incumbent)	18,434	42.9
Democratic	William H. Alford	12,111	28.2
Populist	J. L. Gilbert	10,719	25.0
Prohibition	W. H. Somers	1,669	3.9
Total votes		42,933	100.0
Turnout			
Republican hold			

== See also ==
- 54th United States Congress
- Political party strength in California
- Political party strength in U.S. states
- United States House of Representatives elections, 1894
