= 1875 California lieutenant gubernatorial election =

- September 7, 1875
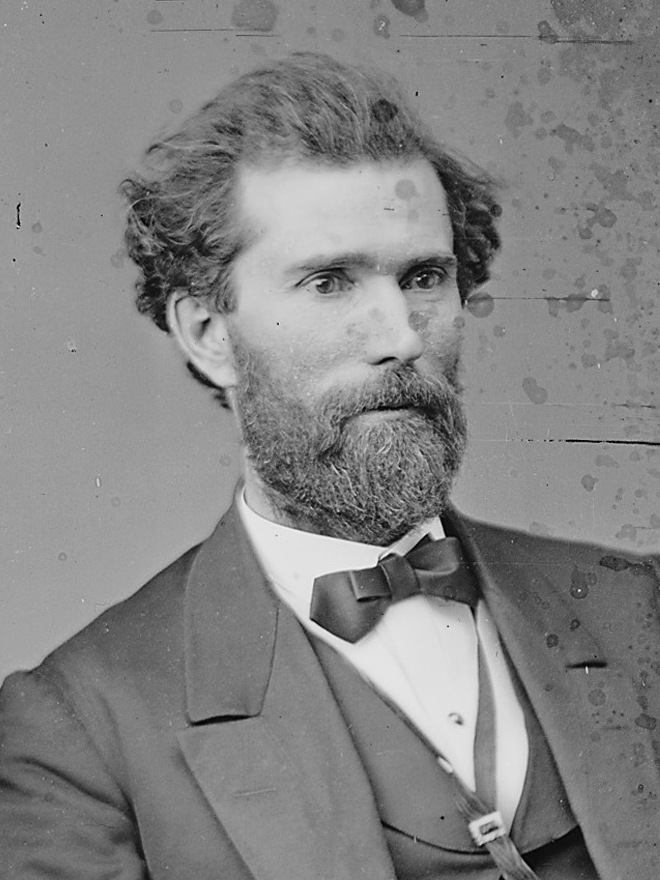

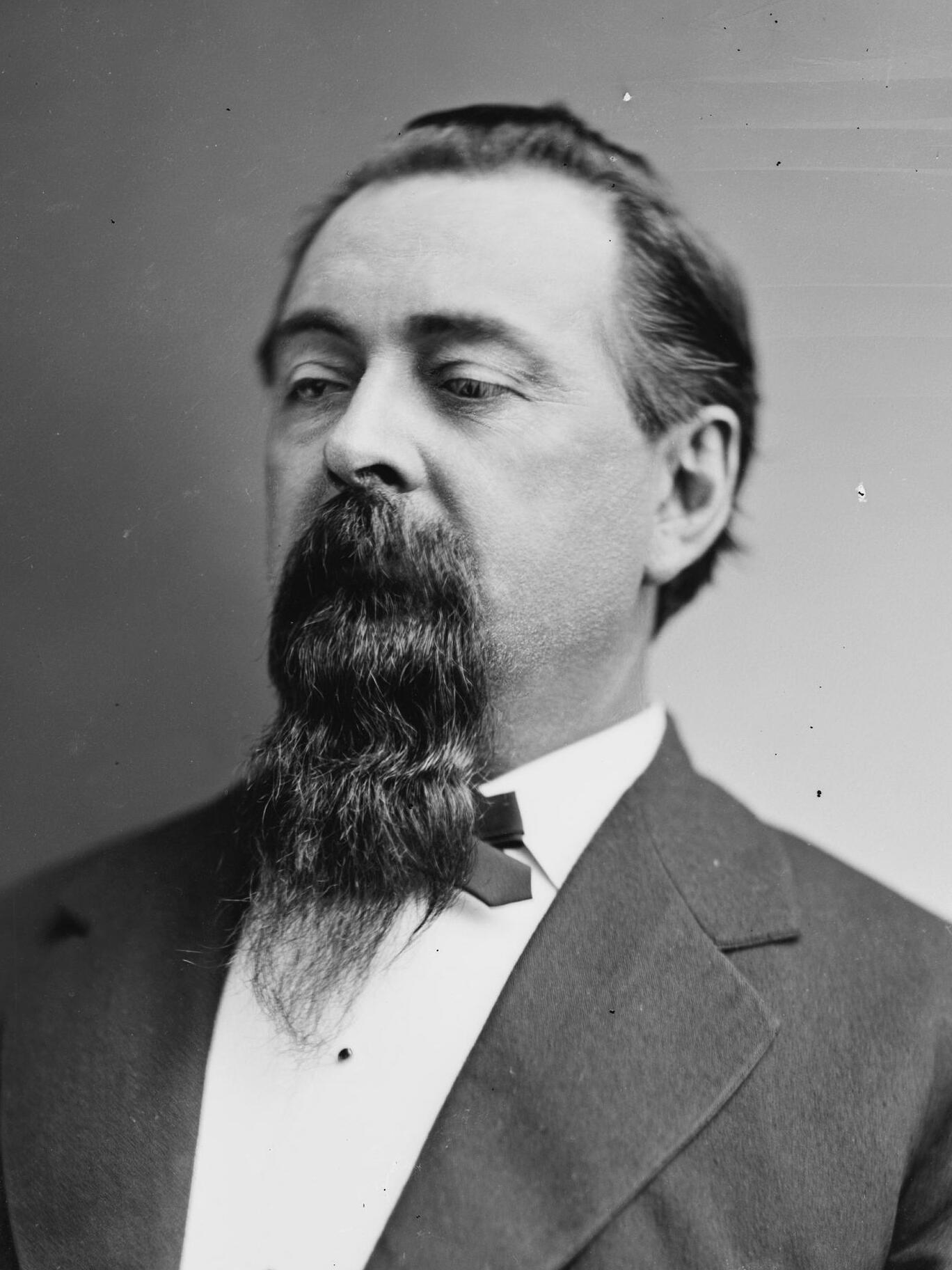

Nominee	James A. Johnson	Romualdo Pacheco	Joseph M. Cavis
Party	Democratic	People's Independent	Republican
Popular vote	58,424	33,335	30,932
Percentage	47.53%	27.12%	25.16%
- County results Johnson: 30–40% 40–50% 50–60% 60–70% 70–80% Pacheco: 30–40% 40–50% 50–60% Cavis: 30–40% 40–50% 50–60%
Lieutenant Governor before election
William Irwin (Acting)
Democratic
Elected Lieutenant Governor
James A. Johnson
Democratic

The 1875 California lieutenant gubernatorial election was held on September 7, 1875, in order to elect the lieutenant governor of California. Democratic nominee and former member of the U.S. House of Representatives from California's 3rd district James A. Johnson defeated Independent candidate and incumbent Governor of California Romualdo Pacheco, Republican nominee Joseph M. Cavis and Prohibition nominee W. D. Hobson.

== General election ==
On election day, September 7, 1875, Democratic nominee James A. Johnson won the election by a margin of 25,089 votes against his foremost opponent Independent candidate Romualdo Pacheco, thereby retaining Democratic control over the office of lieutenant governor. Johnson was sworn in as the 14th lieutenant governor of California on December 9, 1875.

=== Results ===
California lieutenant gubernatorial election, 1875
Party	Candidate	Votes	%
Democratic	James A. Johnson	58,424	47.53
People's Independent	Romualdo Pacheco	33,335	27.12
Republican	Joseph M. Cavis	30,932	25.16
Prohibition	W. D. Hobson	242	0.19
Total votes		122,933	100.00
Democratic hold			
