= 1876 United States House of Representatives elections in California =

1876 elections in California, United States

United States House of Representatives elections in California, 1876
- November 7, 1876

All 4 California seats to the United States House of Representatives
	Majority party	Minority party
Party	Republican	Democratic
Last election	1	3
Seats won	3	1
Seat change	▲2	▼2
Popular vote	81,043	74,228
Percentage	52.2%	47.8%
Swing	▲19.7%	▼0.2%
- Election results by district.

The United States House of Representatives elections in California, 1876 was an election for California's delegation to the United States House of Representatives, which occurred as part of the general election of the House of Representatives on November 7, 1876. Republicans gained two districts.

== Overview ==
United States House of Representatives elections in California, 1876
Party	Votes	Percentage	Seats	+/–
Republican	81,043	52.2%	3	+2
Democratic	74,228	47.8%	1	-2
Totals	155,271	100.0%	4	—

== Delegation Composition ==
Pre-election	Seats
Democratic-Held	3
Republican-Held	1

Post-election	Seats
Republican-Held	3
Democratic-Held	1

== Results ==
Final results from the Clerk of the House of Representatives:

=== District 1 ===
California's 1st congressional district election, 1876
Party	Candidate	Votes	%
Republican	Horace Davis	22,134	53.3
Democratic	William Adam Piper (incumbent)	19,363	46.7
Total votes		41,497	100.0
Turnout			
Republican gain from Democratic			

=== District 2 ===
California's 2nd congressional district election, 1876
Party	Candidate	Votes	%
Republican	Horace F. Page (incumbent)	20,815	56.7
Democratic	Gideon J. Carpenter	15,916	43.3
Total votes		36,731	100.0
Turnout			
Republican hold			

=== District 3 ===
California's 3rd congressional district election, 1876
Party	Candidate	Votes	%
Democratic	John K. Luttrell (incumbent)	19,846	51.1
Republican	Joseph McKenna	18,990	48.9
Total votes		38,836	100.0
Turnout			
Democratic hold			

=== District 4 ===
California's 4th congressional district election, 1876
Party	Candidate	Votes	%
Republican	Romualdo Pacheco	19,104	50.0
Democratic	Peter D. Wigginton (incumbent)	19,103	50.0
Total votes		38,207	100.0
Turnout			
Republican gain from Democratic			

== See also ==
- 45th United States Congress
- Political party strength in California
- Political party strength in U.S. states
- United States House of Representatives elections, 1876
