= Barclay Henley =

American politician

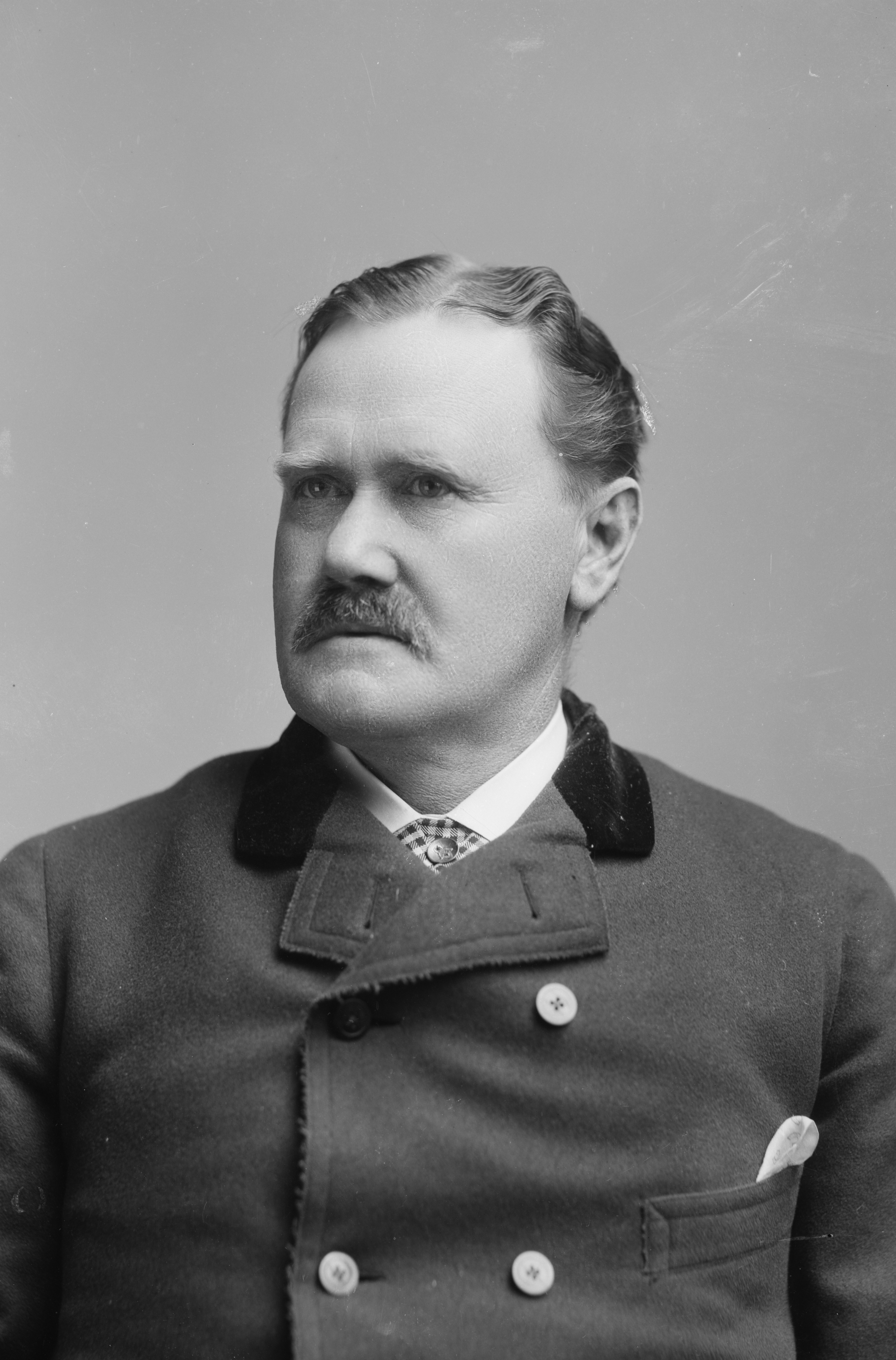
- Portrait by C. M. Bell c. 1883–1887

Member of the U.S. House of Representatives from California
- In office March 4, 1883 – March 3, 1887
- Preceded by: Campbell Polson Berry
- Succeeded by: Thomas Larkin Thompson
- Constituency: 3rd district (1883–1885); 1st district (1885–1887)

Personal details
- Born: March 17, 1843 Charlestown, Indiana, U.S.
- Died: February 15, 1914 (aged 70) San Francisco, California, U.S.
- Resting place: Santa Rosa Rural Cemetery, Santa Rosa, California
- Party: Democratic
- Education: Hanover College

Barclay Henley (March 17, 1843 – February 15, 1914) was an attorney and politician who served two terms as United States Representative from California from 1883 to 1887.

== Early life and career ==
Henley was born in Charlestown, Indiana, and was the son of Thomas J. Henley. He moved with his parents to San Francisco, California in 1853 and returned to Indiana in 1858 to attend Hanover College. He returned to San Francisco in 1861 and studied law. He was admitted to the bar in 1864 and commenced practice in Santa Rosa, California.

== Politics ==
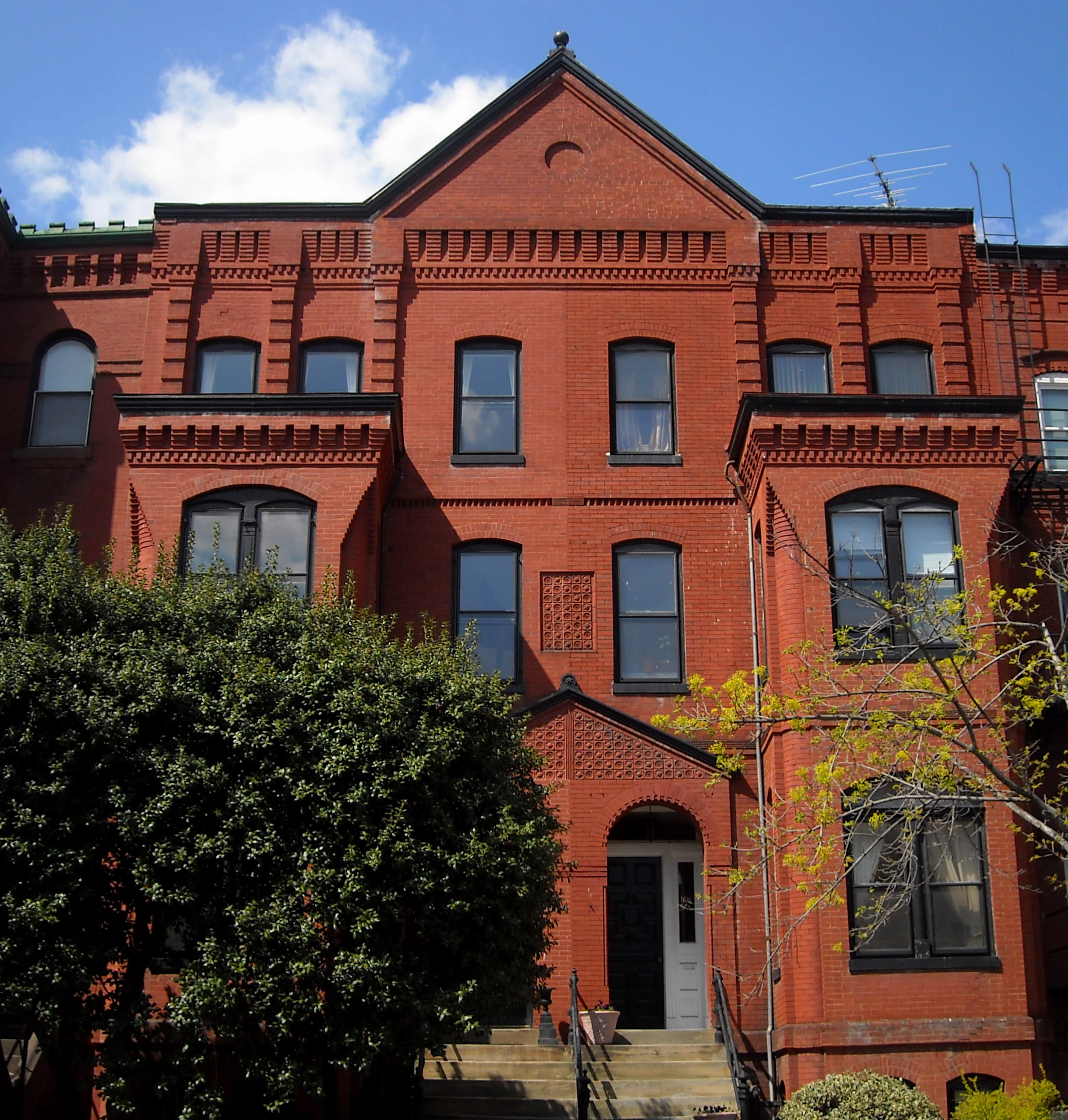
Barclay Henley's former residence in Washington, D.C.

Henley was a member of the State assembly in 1869 and 1870. He was the district attorney of Sonoma County in 1875 and 1876.

=== Congress ===
He was elected as a Democrat to the 48th and 49th United States Congresses, serving from March 4, 1883, to March 3, 1887.

== Later career and death ==
Henley's son Barclay Jr. c. 1903

He again settled in San Francisco and continued the practice of law until his death in that city in 1914. His remains were cremated and the ashes interred in the Santa Rosa Rural Cemetery, Santa Rosa, California.

== Electoral history ==
1882 United States House of Representatives elections in California, District 3
Party	Candidate	Votes	%
Democratic	Barclay Henley	21,807	51.3
Republican	John J. De Haven	19,473	45.8
Prohibition	H. S. Graves	862	2.0
Greenback	W. Howe	401	0.9
Total votes		42,543	100.0
Democratic hold			

1884 United States House of Representatives elections
Party	Candidate	Votes	%
Democratic	Barclay Henley	16,461	49.7
Republican	Thomas L. Carothers	16,316	49.3
Independent	C. C. Bateman	321	1.0
Total votes		33,098	100.0
Democratic hold			

U.S. House of Representatives
Preceded by Campbell Polson Berry	Member of the U.S. House of Representatives from California's 3rd congressional district 1883–1885	Succeeded by Joseph McKenna
Preceded by William Rosecrans	Member of the U.S. House of Representatives from California's 1st congressional district 1885–1887	Succeeded by Thomas Larkin Thompson
