= 1872 United States House of Representatives elections in California =

United States House of Representatives elections in California, 1872
- November 5, 1872

All 4 California seats to the United States House of Representatives
	Majority party	Minority party
Party	Republican	Democratic
Last election	3	0
Seats won	3	1
Seat change	Steady	▲1
Popular vote	49,237	46,743
Percentage	51.3%	48.7%
Swing	▼1.0%	▲1.0%
- Election results by district.

The United States House of Representatives elections in California, 1872 was an election for California's delegation to the United States House of Representatives, which occurred as part of the general election of the House of Representatives on November 5, 1872. California gained one seat as a result of the 1870 census, which the Republicans won. The Democrats, however, gained a Republican-held district. (Note: The Democratic candidates here ran under the label "Liberal Republican".)

== Overview ==
United States House of Representatives elections in California, 1872
Party	Votes	Percentage	Seats	+/–
Republican	49,237	51.3%	3	0
Democratic	46,743	48.7%	1	+1
Totals	95,980	100.0%	4	+1

== Delegation Composition ==
Pre-election	Seats
Republican-Held	3

Post-election	Seats
Republican-Held	3
Democratic-Held	1

== Results ==
Final results from the Clerk of the House of Representatives:

=== District 1 ===
California's 1st congressional district election, 1872
Party	Candidate	Votes	%
Republican	Charles Clayton	11,938	52.3
Democratic	William Adam Piper	10,883	47.7
Total votes		22,821	100.0
Turnout			
Republican win (new seat)			

=== District 2 ===
California's 2nd congressional district election, 1872
Party	Candidate	Votes	%
Republican	Horace Francis Page	13,803	51.9
Democratic	Pasz Coggins	12,816	48.1
Total votes		26,619	100.0
Turnout			
Republican hold			

=== District 3 ===
California's 3rd congressional district election, 1872
Party	Candidate	Votes	%
Democratic	John K. Luttrell	14,032	51.7
Republican	John M. Coghlan (incumbent)	13,105	48.3
Total votes		27,137	100.0
Turnout			
Democratic gain from Republican			

=== District 4 ===
California's 4th congressional district election, 1872
Party	Candidate	Votes	%
Republican	Sherman Otis Houghton (inc.)	10,391	53.5
Democratic	Edward J. Kewen	9,012	46.5
Total votes		19,403	100.0
Turnout			
Republican hold			

== See also ==
- 43rd United States Congress
- Political party strength in California
- Political party strength in U.S. states
- United States House of Representatives elections, 1872
