= 1868 United States House of Representatives elections in California =

United States House of Representatives elections in California, 1868
- November 3, 1868

All 3 California seats to the United States House of Representatives
	Majority party	Minority party
Party	Democratic	Republican
Last election	2	1
Seats won	2	1
Seat change	Steady	Steady
Popular vote	54,548	53,873
Percentage	50.3%	49.7%
Swing	▼1.8%	▲1.8%

Democratic
50–60%
Republican
50–60%
Winners
Democratic hold
Republican hold

The United States House of Representatives elections in California, 1868 were elections for California's delegation to the United States House of Representatives, which occurred as part of the general election of the House of Representatives on November 3, 1868. California's delegation remained at two Democrats and one Republican.

== Results ==
=== District 1 ===
California's 1st congressional district election, 1868
Party	Candidate	Votes	%
Democratic	Samuel Beach Axtell (incumbent)	23,632	54.1
Republican	Frank M. Pixley	20,081	45.9
Total votes		43,713	100.0
Turnout			
Democratic hold			

=== District 2 ===
California's 2nd congressional district election, 1868
Party	Candidate	Votes	%
Republican	Aaron Augustus Sargent	18,264	54.7
Democratic	James W. Coffroth	15,124	45.3
Total votes		33,388	100.0
Turnout			
Republican hold			

=== District 3 ===
California's 3rd congressional district election, 1868
Party	Candidate	Votes	%
Democratic	James A. Johnson (incumbent)	15,792	50.4
Republican	Chancellor Hartson	15,528	49.6
Total votes		31,320	100.0
Turnout			
Democratic hold			

== See also ==
- 41st United States Congress
- Political party strength in California
- Political party strength in U.S. states
- United States House of Representatives elections, 1868
