= John K. Luttrell =

American politician

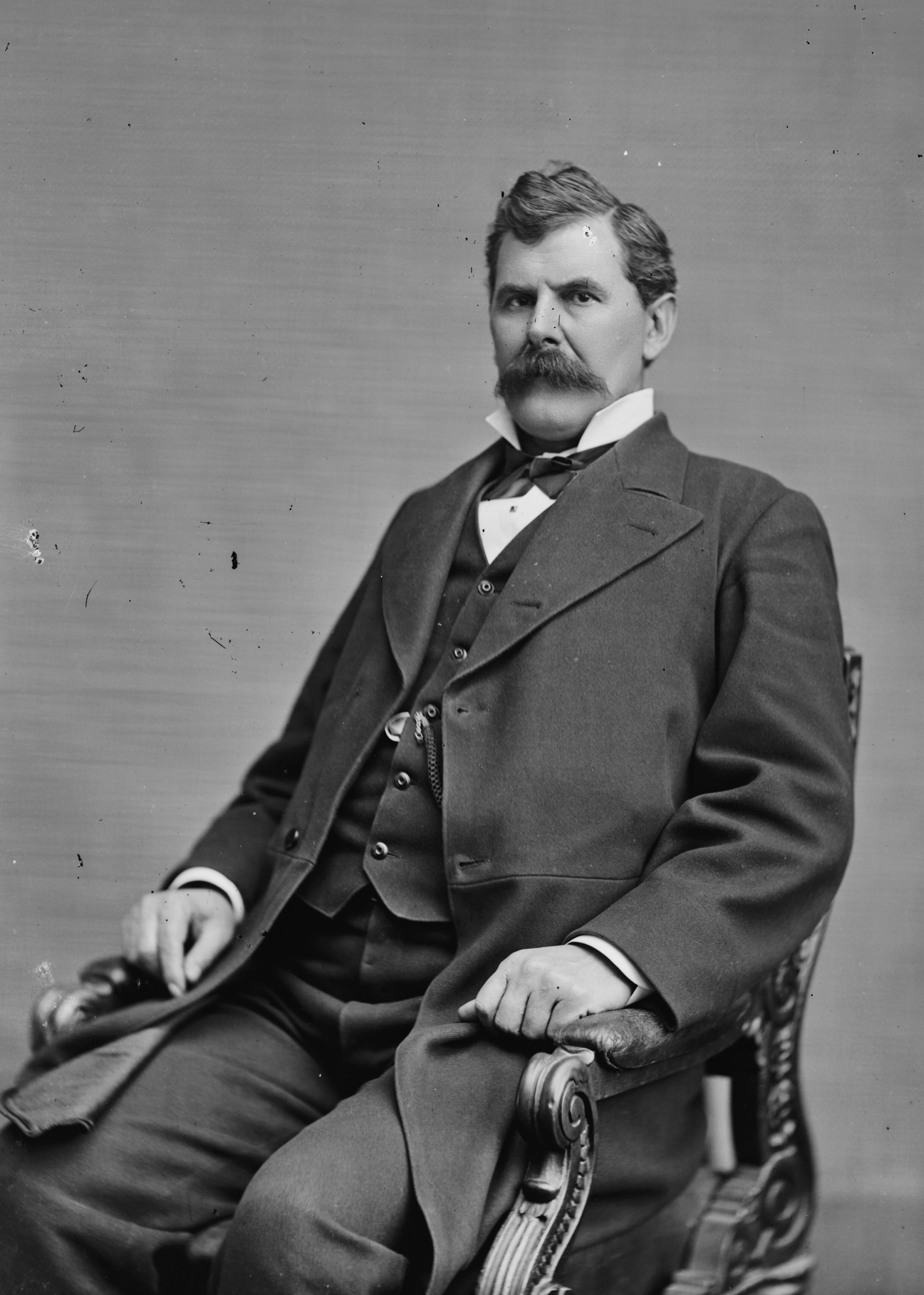
- Portrait by Brady c. 1873–1879

Member of the U.S. House of Representatives from California's 3rd district
- In office March 4, 1873 – March 3, 1879
- Preceded by: John M. Coghlan
- Succeeded by: Campbell Polson Berry

Personal details
- Born: John King Luttrell; June 27, 1831 Knoxville, Tennessee, U.S.
- Died: October 4, 1893 (aged 62) Sitka, District of Alaska, U.S.
- Resting place: Fort Jones Cemetery, Fort Jones, California
- Party: Democratic
- Spouse: Samantha Jane Patterson
- Children: Henry; Francis; Herbert; Paul
- Profession: Lawyer, politician

John King Luttrell (June 27, 1831 – October 4, 1893) was an American miner, lawyer and politician who served three terms as a U.S. representative from California from 1873 to 1879.

== Early life ==
Born near Knoxville, Tennessee, Luttrell attended the common schools. He moved with his parents to a farm in Alabama in 1844. He moved to Missouri in 1845 with his parents, who settled on a farm near St. Joseph. He moved to California in 1852 and engaged in mining. He also studied law.

He settled in Yolo County and engaged in agricultural pursuits. He moved to Prairie City (later Folsom) in 1853, to El Dorado County in 1854 and thence to Watsonville in Santa Cruz County, and to Alameda County. In the 1870s he moved to Sonoma County, living on a ranch there (now part of Sugarloaf Ridge State Park) for ten years prior to being appointed U.S. Commissioner of Fisheries for Alaska.

== Early career ==
He was admitted to the bar and commenced practice in Oakland in 1856. He was a Justice of the Peace in Brooklyn (now a part of Oakland) in 1856 and 1857. He moved to Siskiyou County in 1858 and purchased a ranch near Fort Jones. He engaged in agricultural pursuits, mining, and the practice of law.

He was sergeant at arms of the California State Assembly in 1865 and 1866. He again served as a member of the Assembly in 1871 and 1872.

== Congress ==
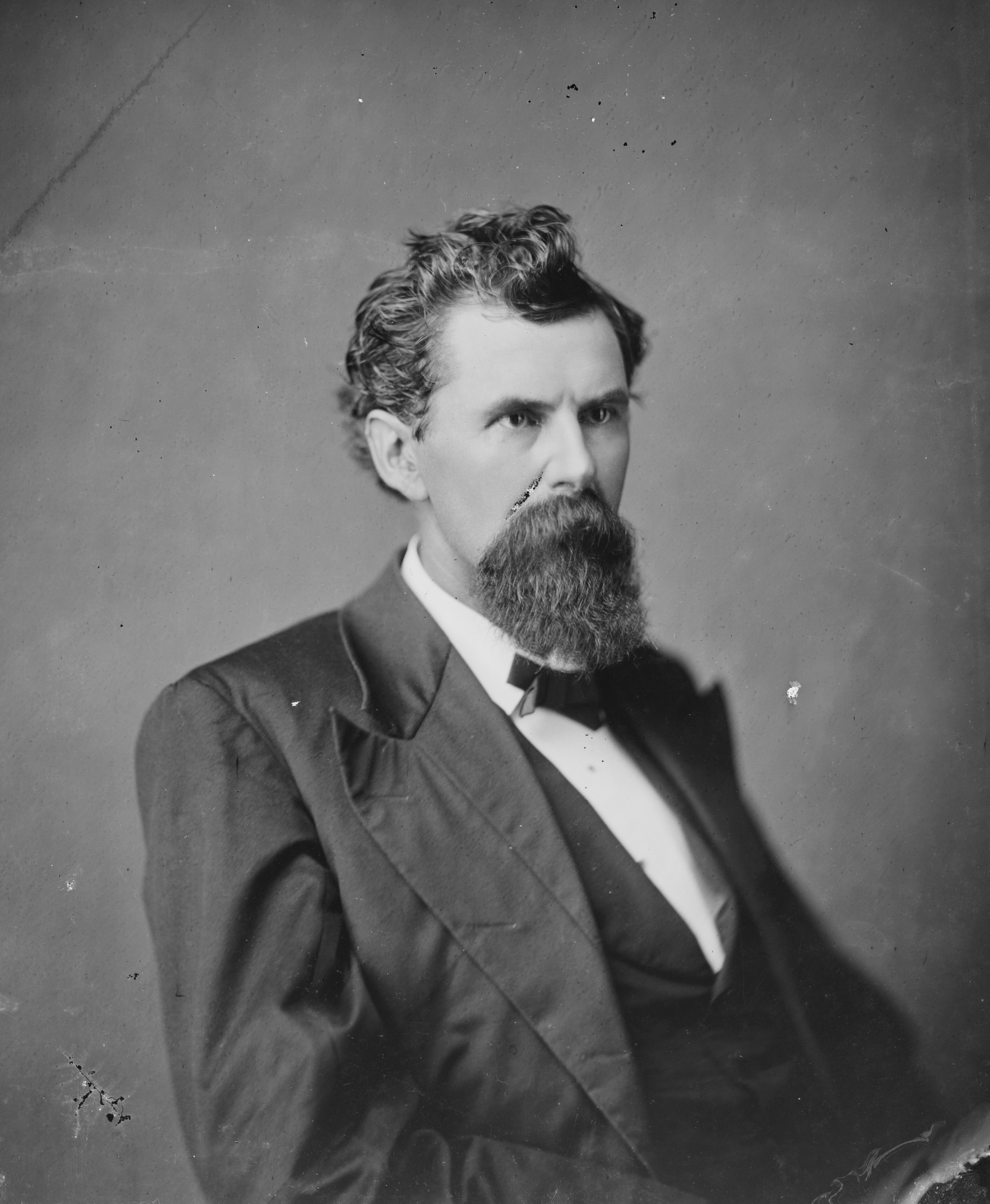
Portrait by Brady c. 1873–1879

Luttrell was elected as a Democrat to the Forty-third, Forty-fourth, and Forty-fifth Congresses (March 4, 1873 – March 3, 1879). He declined to be a candidate for reelection.

== Later career ==
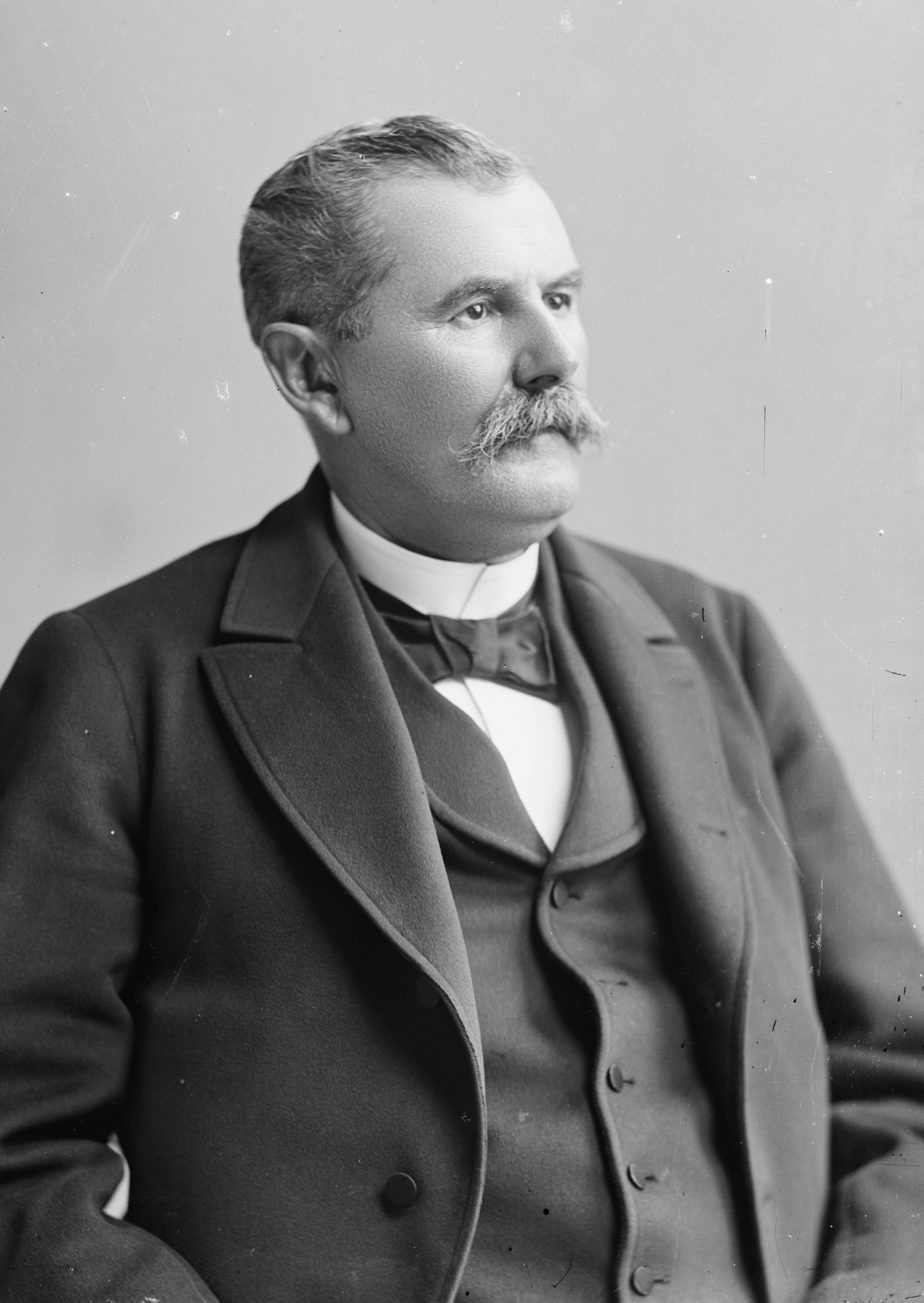
Portrait by C. M. Bell c. 1891–1893

He resumed the practice of law, farming, and mining. He served as member of the board of state prison directors from 1887 to 1889. He was appointed United States Commissioner of Fisheries and special agent of the United States Treasury for Alaska in 1893.

== Death and burial ==
He died in Sitka, Alaska at age 62, and was interred in Fort Jones Cemetery, Fort Jones, California.

== Electoral history ==
1872 United States House of Representatives elections in California, District 3
Party	Candidate	Votes	%
Democratic	John K. Luttrell	14,032	51.7
Republican	John M. Coghlan (Incumbent)	13,105	48.3
Total votes		27,137	100.0
Democratic gain from Republican			

1875 United States House of Representatives elections in California, District 3
Party	Candidate	Votes	%
Democratic	John K. Luttrell (Incumbent)	18,468	55.1
Republican	C. B. Denio	8,284	24.7
Independent	Charles F. Reed	6,761	20.2
Total votes		33,513	100.0
Democratic hold			

1876 United States House of Representatives elections in California, District 3
Party	Candidate	Votes	%
Democratic	John K. Luttrell (Incumbent)	19,846	51.1
Republican	Joseph McKenna	18,990	48.9
Total votes		38,836	100.0
Democratic hold			

== Sources ==
- United States Congress. "John K. Luttrell (id: L000522)". Biographical Directory of the United States Congress.

Political offices
Preceded by S. L. Littlefield, R. C. Scott	California State Assemblyman, 28th District; 1865–1867 (with[Thomas H. Steele)	Succeeded by John A. Fairchild, Elijah Steele
Preceded by Robert M. Martin, William Shores	California State Assemblyman, 28th District; 1871–1873 (with W. A. Little)	Succeeded by William T. Cressler, John W. McBride
U.S. House of Representatives
Preceded by John M. Coghlan	Member of the U.S. House of Representatives from California's 3rd congressional district March 4, 1873 – March 3, 1879	Succeeded by Campbell P. Berry
