= John M. Coghlan =

American politician (1835–1879)

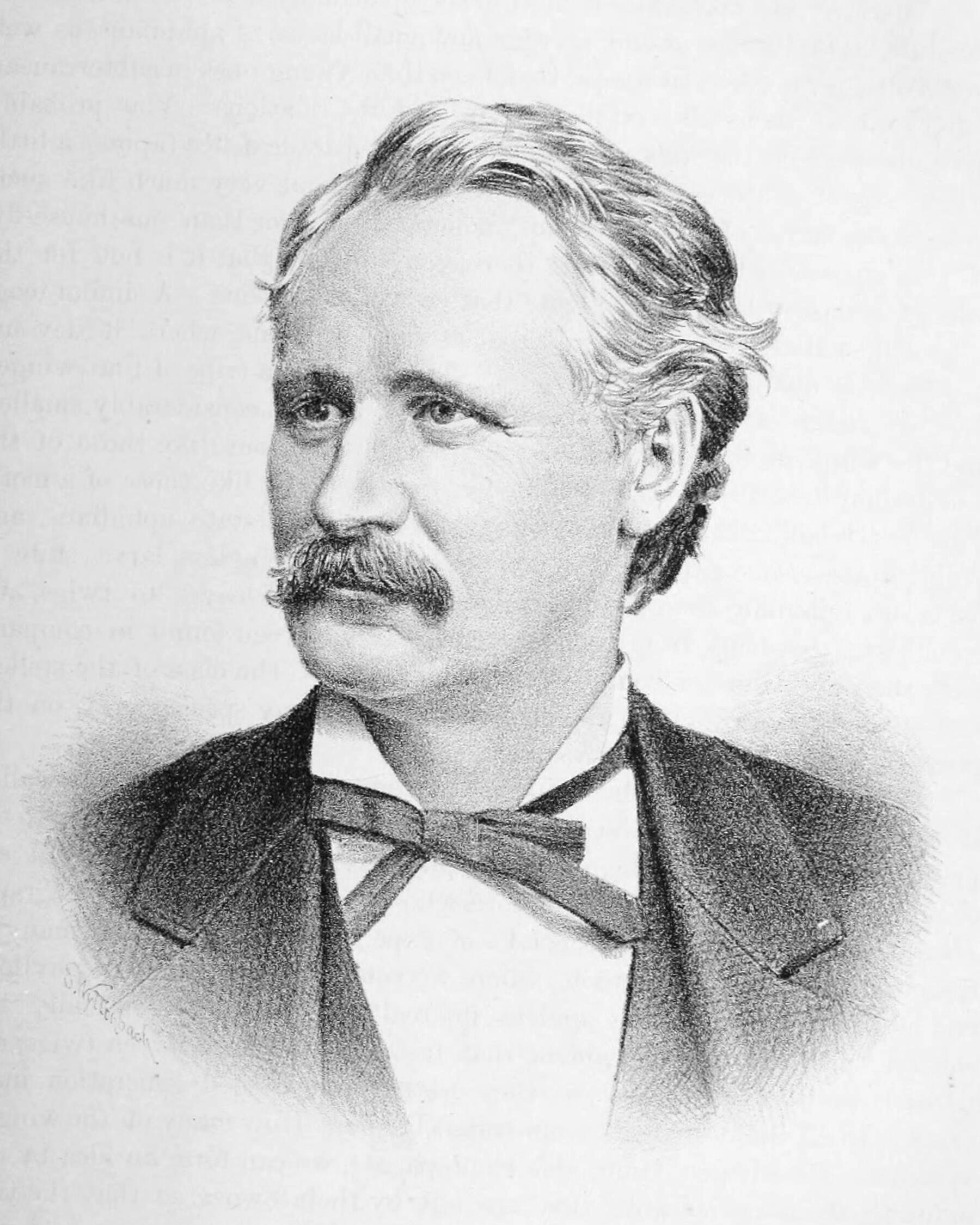

Member of the U.S. House of Representatives from California's 3rd district
- In office March 4, 1871 – March 3, 1873
- Preceded by: James A. Johnson
- Succeeded by: John K. Luttrell

Member of the California State Assembly from the 18th district
- In office December 4, 1865 – December 2, 1867
- Preceded by: Multi-member district
- Succeeded by: Multi-member district

United States Attorney for the Northern District of California
- In office 1876–1878

Personal details
- Born: December 8, 1835 Louisville, Kentucky, U.S.
- Died: March 26, 1879 (aged 43) Oakland, California, U.S.
- Resting place: Mountain View Cemetery
- Party: Republican
- Spouse: Eva Coombs
- Children: 3, including Nathan
- Relatives: Nathan Coombs (father-in-law); Frank Coombs (brother-in-law)

John Maxwell Coghlan (December 8, 1835 – March 26, 1879) was a California Republican politician who represented California's 3rd congressional district in the 42nd United States Congress from 1871 to 1873.

== Early life ==
Coghlan was born in Louisville, Kentucky and moved with his parents to Illinois in 1847, and again in 1850 to California during the California Gold Rush, where they settled in Suisun City.

Coghlan studied law and was admitted to the bar and practiced in Suisun City. He married Eva Coombs, the daughter of state assemblyman Nathan Coombs.

== Political career ==
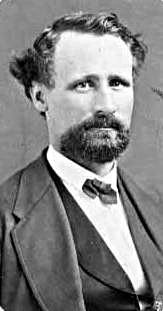
Coghlan, undated

He was a member of the California State Assembly from 1865 to 1867, representing Napa and Lake counties.

=== Congress ===
He was elected as a Republican to the 42nd Congress (1871–1873), but lost his bid for reelection in 1872 to Democrat John K. Luttrell.

== Later career and death ==
He was the United States Attorney for the Northern District of California from 1876 to 1878, and was appointed Chief Justice of the Territorial Utah Supreme Court, and confirmed by the United States Senate, but declined to serve. He practiced law in Oakland, California until his death in 1879. He is buried in Mountain View Cemetery.

== Electoral results ==
1871 United States House of Representatives elections in California, District 3
Party	Candidate	Votes	%
Republican	John M. Coghlan	18,503	51.7
Democratic	George Pearce	17,309	48.3
Total votes		35,812	100.0
Republican gain from Democratic			

1872 United States House of Representatives elections in California, District 3
Party	Candidate	Votes	%
Democratic	John K. Luttrell	14,032	51.7
Republican	John M. Coghlan (Incumbent)	13,105	48.3
Total votes		27,137	100.0
Democratic gain from Republican			

Political offices
Preceded by W. B. H. Dodson	California State Assemblyman, 18th District (Napa/Lake County seat); 1865–1867	Succeeded by John C. Crigler
U.S. House of Representatives
Preceded by James A. Johnson	Member of the U.S. House of Representatives from California's 3rd congressional district 1871–1873	Succeeded by John K. Luttrell
