= 1875 United States House of Representatives elections in California =

United States House of Representatives elections in California, 1875
- September 7, 1875

All 4 California seats to the United States House of Representatives
	Majority party	Minority party
Party	Democratic	Republican
Last election	1	3
Seats won	3	1
Seat change	▲2	▼2
Popular vote	58,688	39,789
Percentage	48.0%	32.5%
Swing	▼0.7%	▼18.8%
- Election results by district.

The United States House of Representatives elections in California, 1875 were elections for California's delegation to the United States House of Representatives, which occurred on September 7, 1875. Democrats gained two districts.

== Results ==
Final results from the Clerk of the House of Representatives:

=== District 1 ===
California's 1st congressional district election, 1875
Party	Candidate	Votes	%
Democratic	William Adam Piper	12,417	49.1
Republican	Ira P. Rankin	6,791	26.8
Independent	John F. Swift	6,103	24.1
Total votes		25,311	100.0
Turnout			
Democratic gain from Republican			

=== District 2 ===
California's 2nd congressional district election, 1875
Party	Candidate	Votes	%
Republican	Horace F. Page (incumbent)	13,624	43.4
Democratic	Hy Larkin	12,154	38.8
Independent	Charles R. Tuttle	5,589	17.8
Total votes		31,367	100.0
Turnout			
Republican hold			

=== District 3 ===
California's 3rd congressional district election, 1875
Party	Candidate	Votes	%
Democratic	John K. Luttrell (incumbent)	18,468	55.1
Republican	C. B. Denio	8,284	24.7
Independent	Charles F. Reed	6,761	20.2
Total votes		33,513	100.0
Turnout			
Democratic hold			

=== District 4 ===
California's 4th congressional district election, 1875
Party	Candidate	Votes	%
Democratic	Peter D. Wigginton	15,649	48.8
Republican	Sherman Otis Houghton (inc.)	11,090	34.6
Independent	J. S. Thompson	5,343	16.7
Total votes		32,082	100.0
Turnout			
Democratic gain from Republican			

== See also ==
- 44th United States Congress
- Political party strength in California
- Political party strength in U.S. states
- United States House of Representatives elections, 1874
