= 1879 United States House of Representatives elections in California =

United States House of Representatives elections in California, 1879
- September 3, 1879

All 4 California seats to the United States House of Representatives
	Majority party	Minority party
Party	Republican	Democratic
Last election	3	1
Seats won	3	1
Seat change	Steady	Steady
Popular vote	74,651	47,915
Percentage	47.6%	30.6%
Swing	▼4.6%	▼17.2%
- Election results by district.

The United States House of Representatives elections in California, 1879 were elections for California's delegation to the United States House of Representatives, which occurred on September 3, 1879. California's delegation remained unchanged, at three Republicans and one Democrat.

== Results ==
Final results from the Clerk of the House of Representatives:

=== District 1 ===
California's 1st congressional district election, 1879
Party	Candidate	Votes	%
Republican	Horace Davis (incumbent)	20,074	48.4
Workingman's	Clitus Barbour	18,449	44.5
Democratic	Charles A. Sumner	2,940	7.1
Total votes		41,463	100.0
Turnout			
Republican hold			

=== District 2 ===
California's 2nd congressional district election, 1879
Party	Candidate	Votes	%
Republican	Horace F. Page (incumbent)	19,386	51.9
Democratic	Thomas J. Clunie	12,847	34.4
Workingman's	H. P. Williams	5,139	13.8
Total votes		37,372	100.0
Turnout			
Republican hold			

=== District 3 ===
California's 3rd congressional district election, 1879
Party	Candidate	Votes	%
Democratic	Campbell P. Berry	20,019	50.2
Republican	Joseph McKenna	19,800	49.6
Workingman's	George T. Elliott	93	0.2
Total votes		39,912	100.0
Turnout			
Democratic hold			

=== District 4 ===
California's 4th congressional district election, 1879
Party	Candidate	Votes	%
Republican	Romualdo Pacheco	15,391	40.5
Democratic	R. Wallace Leach	12,109	31.8
Workingman's	James J. Ayers	10,527	27.7
Total votes		38,027	100.0
Turnout			
Republican hold			

== See also ==
- 46th United States Congress
- Political party strength in California
- Political party strength in U.S. states
- United States House of Representatives elections, 1878
