= Warren B. English =

American politician

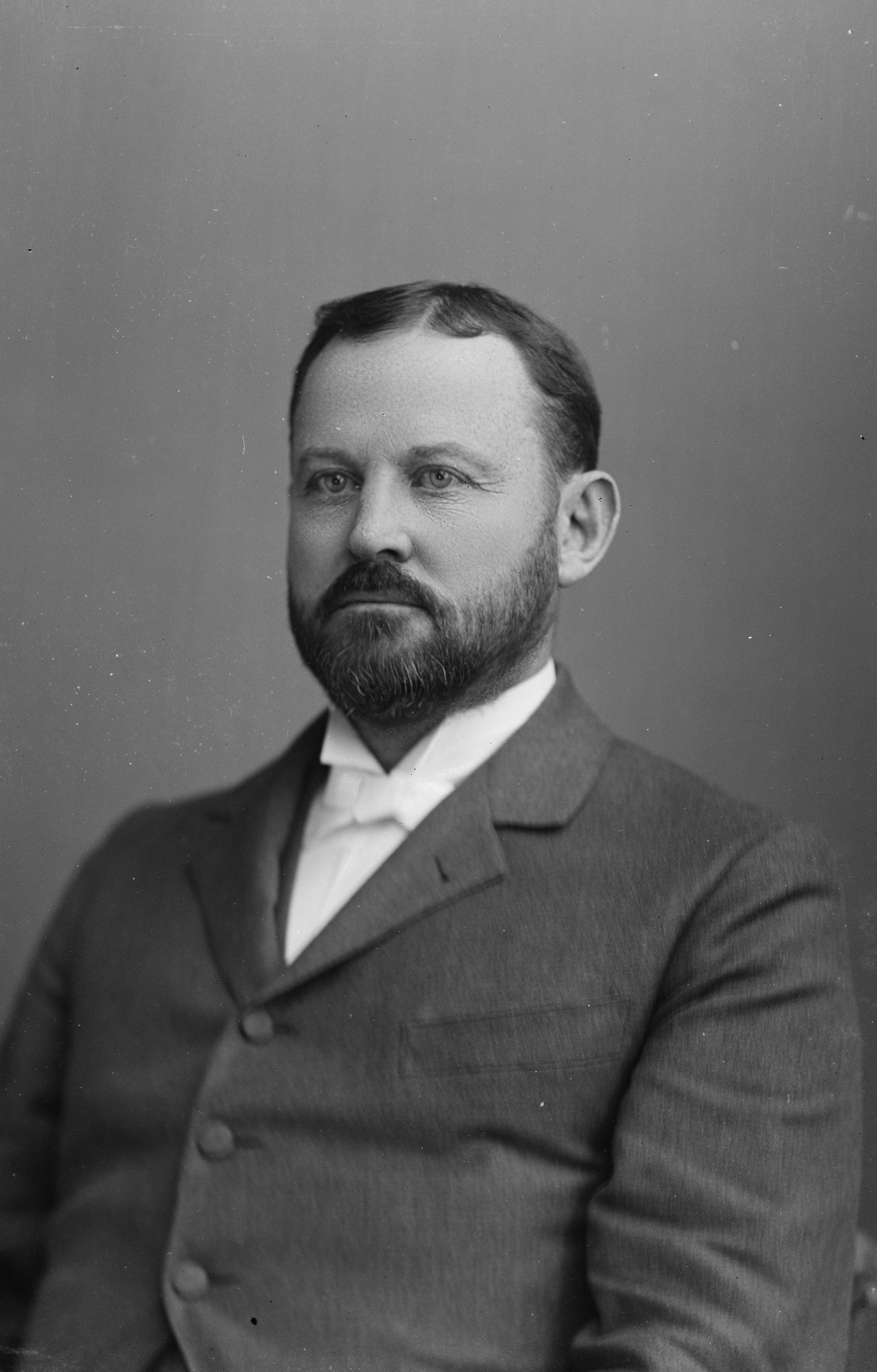
- Portrait by C. M. Bell c. 1894–1895

Member of the U.S. House of Representatives from California's 3rd district
- In office April 4, 1894 – March 3, 1895
- Preceded by: Samuel G. Hilborn
- Succeeded by: Samuel G. Hilborn

Member of the California Senate from the 15th district
- In office January 8, 1883 – January 5, 1885
- Preceded by: William H. Sears
- Succeeded by: Frank Coye De Long

Personal details
- Born: May 1, 1840 Charles Town, Virginia, U.S.
- Died: January 9, 1913 (aged 72) Santa Rosa, California, U.S.
- Party: Democratic
- Spouse: Clara Norris English
- Children: 5

Military service
- Branch/service: Confederate Army
- Battles/wars: American Civil War

Warren Barkley English (May 1, 1840 – January 9, 1913) was an American politician who served one year as a United States representative from California from 1894 to 1895.

== Biography ==
Born in Charles Town, Virginia (now West Virginia), he attended the public schools and Charles Town Academy until June 1861. He served in the Confederate Army during the American Civil War and after the war moved to Oakland, California where he attended the California Military Academy.

English was elected a member of the board of supervisors of Contra Costa County in 1877 and served four years. He was elected State Senator in 1882 and was named a delegate to the Democratic National Convention in 1884.

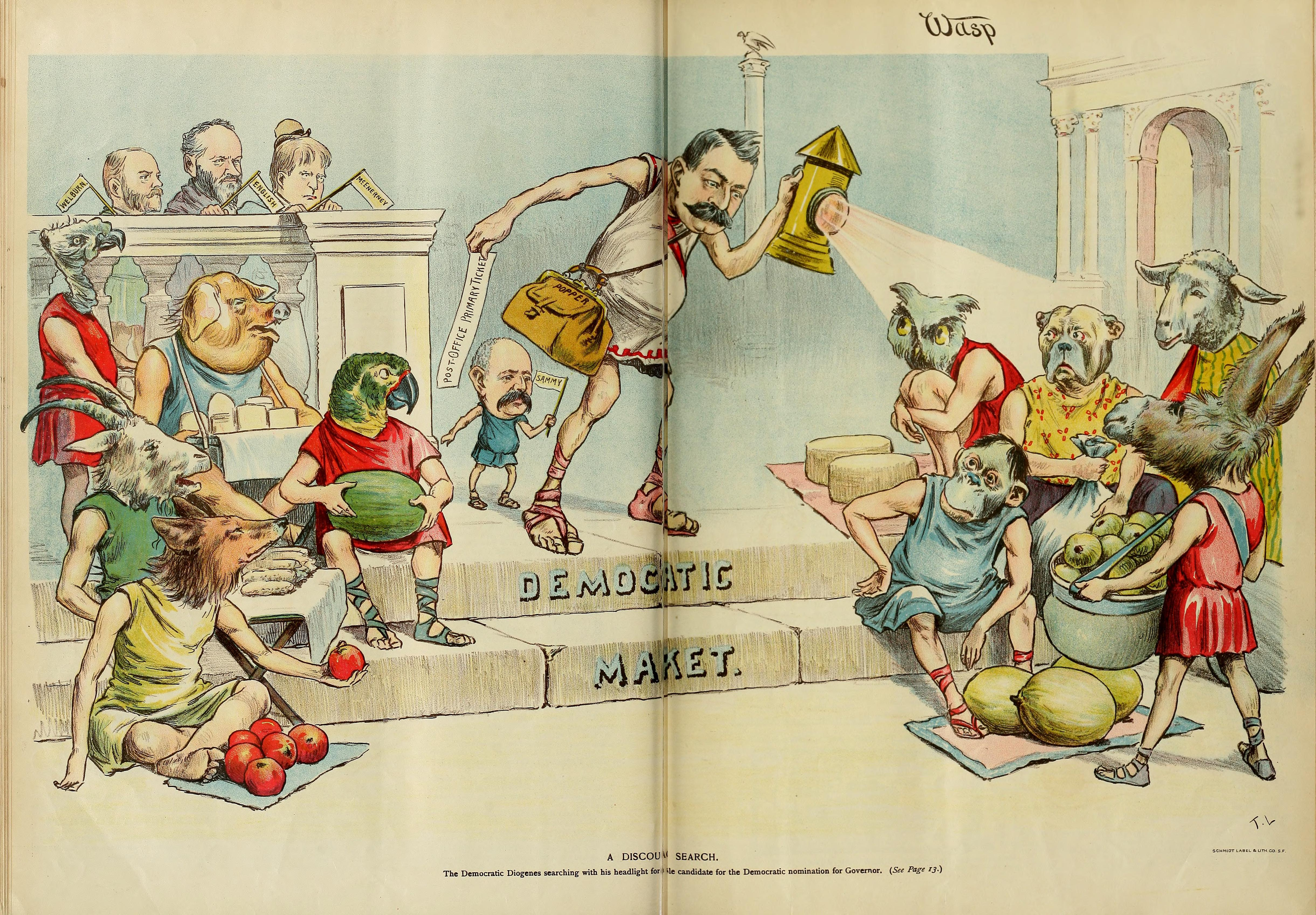
"A Discouraging Search," a political cartoon published in The Wasp depicting San Francisco political boss Max Popper as Diogenes searching for a candidate for Governor as English's brother William looks on, June 30, 1894

His brother, William D. English sought the 1890 Democratic nomination for governor of California. The California Democratic State Convention was controlled by San Francisco Boss, Christopher Buckley. Buckley secured the nomination for San Francisco Mayor Edward B. Pond over Alameda County's favorite son, W.D. English. Pond would go on to lose to Henry Markham in the general election.

Warren English successfully contested as a Democrat the election of Samuel G. Hilborn to the Fifty-third Congress and took his seat April 4, 1894, serving until March 3, 1895. He was unsuccessful candidate for reelection in 1894 to the Fifty-fourth Congress. After leaving Congress, he engaged in the real estate business in Oakland. In 1905, he moved to Sonoma County, California where he engaged in viticulture. He died in Santa Rosa, California in 1913 and was buried in Mountain View Cemetery, Oakland, California.

U.S. House of Representatives
Preceded by Samuel G. Hilborn	Member of the U.S. House of Representatives from California's 3rd congressional district 1894-1895	Succeeded by Samuel G. Hilborn
