= James A. Johnson (California politician) =

American politician (1829-1896)

James Augustus Johnson
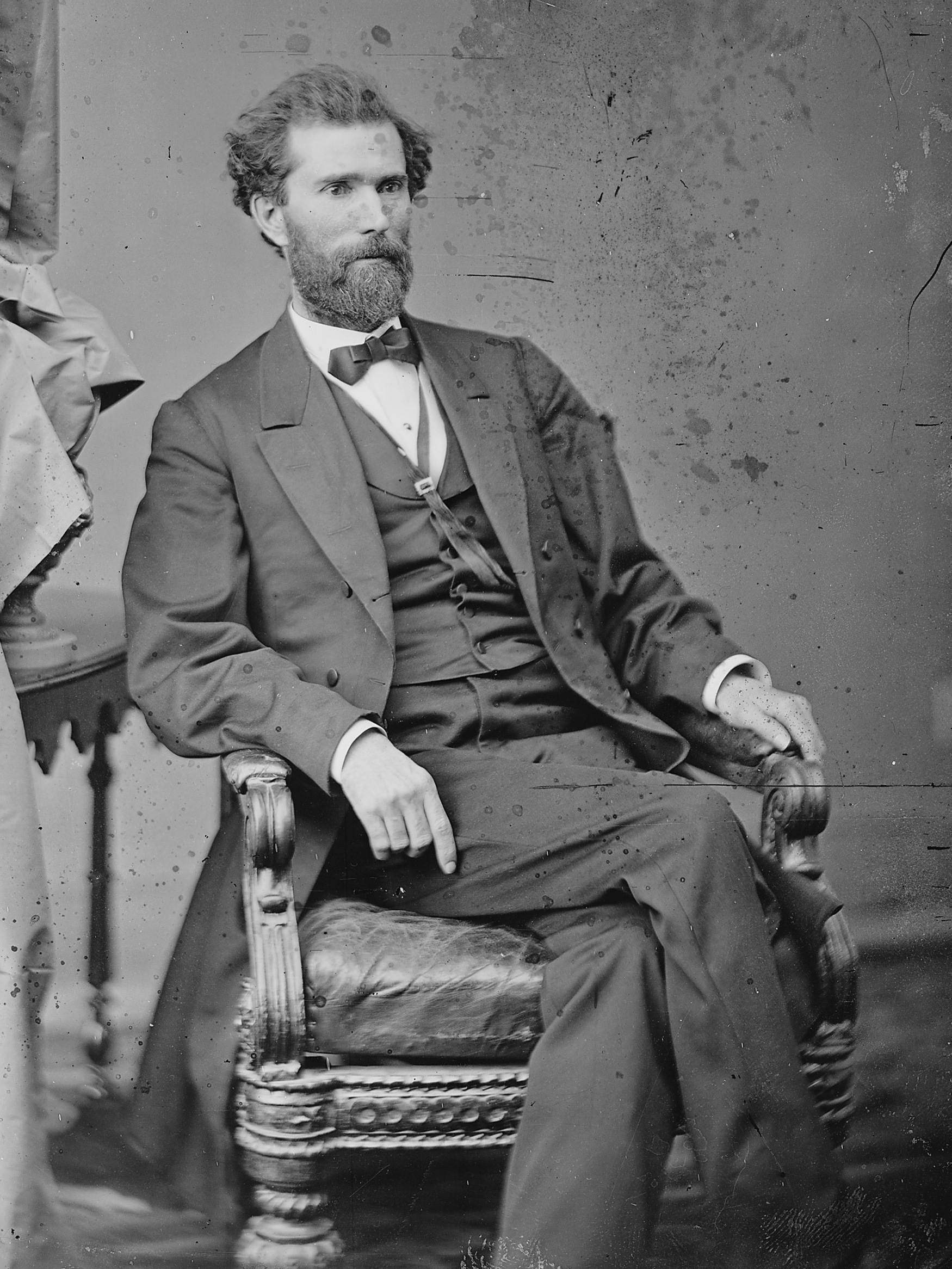
- Portrait by Brady c. 1860–1865

14th Lieutenant Governor of California
- In office December 9, 1875 – January 14, 1880
- Governor: William Irwin
- Preceded by: William Irwin
- Succeeded by: John Mansfield

Member of the U.S. House of Representatives from California's 3rd district
- In office March 4, 1867 – March 3, 1871
- Preceded by: John Bidwell
- Succeeded by: John M. Coghlan

Member of the California Assembly
- In office 1859–1861 Serving with Joshiah Lefever, Thomas J. Haliday
- Preceded by: J. A. Clarke, R. D. Hill
- Succeeded by: John Dougherty, Thomas Wright

Personal details
- Born: May 16, 1829 Spartanburg, South Carolina, US
- Died: May 11, 1896 (aged 66) San Francisco, California, US
- Resting place: Woodlawn Memorial Park Cemetery, Colma, California.
- Party: Democratic
- Occupation: lawyer

James Augustus Johnson (May 16, 1829 – May 11, 1896) was an American physician, lawyer, and politician. He served as a U.S. representative from California from 1867 to 1871. He went on to serve as the 14th lieutenant governor of California from 1875 to 1880.

== Early life ==
Johnson was born May 16, 1829, in Spartanburg, South Carolina. When he was quite young he moved with his parents to Arkansas where he attended the common schools. He moved to California in 1853. He studied medicine and was graduated from Jefferson Medical College in Philadelphia, Pennsylvania. He then studied law and was admitted to the bar in 1859, then commenced the practice of law in Downieville, California.

== Political career ==
Johnson served as a member of the California State Assembly in 1859 and 1860, representing Sierra County.

=== Congress ===
He was elected as a Democrat to the U.S. House of Representatives for the Fortieth and Forty-first U.S. Congresses, serving from March 4, 1867, until March 3, 1871.

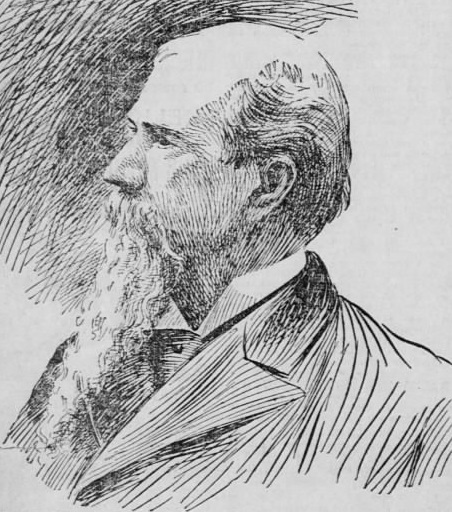
Johnson c. 1896

=== Lieutenant Governor ===
He was elected Lieutenant Governor of California in 1875, serving from 1875 until 1880. After leaving office he moved to San Francisco.

== Later career ==
He served as registrar of voters in 1883 and 1884.

== Death ==
He continued practicing law until his death on May 11, 1896, in San Francisco, at age 66. He was interred in the Masonic Cemetery, and in 1931 was re-interred in Woodlawn Memorial Park Cemetery in Colma, California.

== Federal electoral history ==
1867 United States House of Representatives elections in California, District 3
Party	Candidate	Votes	%
Democratic	James A. Johnson	14,767	50.6
Republican	Chancellor Hartson	14,394	49.4
Total votes		29,161	100.0
Democratic gain from Republican			

1868 United States House of Representatives elections in California, District 3
Party	Candidate	Votes	%
Democratic	James A. Johnson (Incumbent)	15,792	50.4
Republican	Chancellor Hartson	15,528	49.6
Total votes		31,320	100.0
Democratic hold			

Political offices
Preceded by J. A. Clarke, R. D. Hill	Member of the California Assembly from the California's 20th assembly district 1859–1861 (with Joshiah Lefever, then Thomas J. Haliday)	Succeeded by John Dougherty, Thomas Wright
U.S. House of Representatives
Preceded by John Bidwell	Member of the U.S. House of Representatives from California's 3rd congressional district 1867–1871	Succeeded by John M. Coghlan
Political offices
Preceded by William Irwin; Acting Lieutenant Governor	Lieutenant Governor of California; 1875–1880	Succeeded by John Mansfield
