= 1871 United States House of Representatives elections in California =

United States House of Representatives elections in California, 1871
- September 6, 1871

All 3 California seats to the United States House of Representatives
	Majority party	Minority party
Party	Republican	Democratic
Last election	1	2
Seats won	3	0
Seat change	▲2	▼2
Popular vote	62,539	57,065
Percentage	52.3%	47.7%
Swing	▲2.0%	▼2.0%

Republican
50–60%
Winners
Republican hold
Republican gain

The United States House of Representatives elections in California, 1871 were elections for California's delegation to the United States House of Representatives, which occurred on September 6, 1871. Republicans gained both Democratic districts.

== Results ==
Final results from the Clerk of the House of Representatives:

=== District 1 ===
California's 1st congressional district election, 1871
Party	Candidate	Votes	%
Republican	Sherman Otis Houghton	25,971	51.6
Democratic	Lawrence Archer	24,374	48.4
Total votes		50,345	100.0
Turnout			
Republican gain from Democratic			

=== District 2 ===
California's 2nd congressional district election, 1871
Party	Candidate	Votes	%
Republican	Aaron Augustus Sargent (inc.)	18,065	54.0
Democratic	James W. Coffroth	15,382	46.0
Total votes		33,447	100.0
Turnout			
Republican hold			

=== District 3 ===
California's 3rd congressional district election, 1871
Party	Candidate	Votes	%
Republican	John M. Coghlan	18,503	51.7
Democratic	George Pearce	17,309	48.3
Total votes		35,812	100.0
Turnout			
Republican gain from Democratic			

== See also ==
- 42nd United States Congress
- Political party strength in California
- Political party strength in U.S. states
- United States House of Representatives elections, 1870
