= 1880 United States House of Representatives elections in California =

United States House of Representatives elections in California, 1880
- November 2, 1880

All 4 California seats to the United States House of Representatives
	Majority party	Minority party
Party	Republican	Democratic
Last election	3	1
Seats won	2	2
Seat change	▼1	▲1
Popular vote	79,796	79,184
Percentage	48.8%	48.4%
- Election results by district.

The United States House of Representatives elections in California, 1880 was an election for California's delegation to the United States House of Representatives, which occurred as part of the general election of the House of Representatives on November 2, 1880. Democrats gained one district.

== Overview ==
United States House of Representatives elections in California, 1880
Party	Votes	Percentage	Seats	+/–
Republican	79,796	48.8%	2	-1
Democratic	79,184	48.4%	2	+1
Greenback	4,298	2.5%	0	0
Independent	196	0.1%	0	0
Prohibition	126	0.1%	0	0
Totals	163,600	100.0%	4	—

== Delegation Composition ==
Pre-election	Seats
Republican-Held	3
Democratic-Held	1

Post-election	Seats
Democratic-Held	2
Republican-Held	2

== Results ==
Final results from the Clerk of the House of Representatives:

=== District 1 ===
California's 1st congressional district election, 1880
Party	Candidate	Votes	%
Democratic	William Rosecrans	21,005	51.0
Republican	Horace Davis (incumbent)	19,496	47.3
Greenback	Stephen Maybell	683	1.7
Total votes		41,184	100.0
Turnout			
Democratic gain from Republican			

=== District 2 ===
California's 2nd congressional district election, 1880
Party	Candidate	Votes	%
Republican	Horace F. Page (incumbent)	22,038	53.6
Democratic	John R. Glascock	18,859	45.9
Greenback	Benjamin Todd	180	0.4
Prohibition	B. K. Lowe	41	0.1
Total votes		41,118	100.0
Turnout			
Republican hold			

=== District 3 ===
California's 3rd congressional district election, 1880
Party	Candidate	Votes	%
Democratic	Campbell P. Berry (incumbent)	21,743	51.1
Republican	George A. Knight	20,494	48.2
Independent	W. A. Howe	172	0.4
Prohibition	A. Musselman	85	0.2
Independent	A. G. Clark	26	0.1
Total votes		42,520	100.0
Turnout			
Democratic hold			

=== District 4 ===
California's 4th congressional district election, 1880
Party	Candidate	Votes	%
Republican	Romualdo Pacheco (incumbent)	17,768	45.8
Democratic	R. Wallace Leach	17,577	45.3
Greenback	John F. Godfrey	3,435	8.9
Total votes		38,780	100.0
Turnout			
Republican hold			

== See also ==
- 47th United States Congress
- Political party strength in California
- Political party strength in U.S. states
- United States House of Representatives elections, 1880
