= Page Act of 1875 =

United States immigration law

- Long title: An Act supplementary to the acts in relation to immigration.
- Nicknames: Oriental Exclusion Act of 1875
- Enacted by: the 43rd United States Congress
- Effective: March 3, 1875

Citations
- Public law: Pub. L. 43–141
- Statutes at Large: 18 Stat. 477, Chap. 141

Legislative history
- Introduced in the House as H.R. 4747 by Horace F. Page (R–CA) on February 18, 1875; Committee consideration by House Foreign Relations, Senate Committee of the Whole; Passed the House on February 22, 1875 (Passed); Passed the Senate on March 3, 1875 (Passed); Signed into law by President Ulysses S. Grant on March 3, 1875

The Page Act of 1875 (18 Stat. 477, 3 March 1875), was an act which prohibited the immigration of anyone from Asia who was involved in forced labor, any woman from Asia who was involved in prostitution, and anyone from anywhere who was convicted of a criminal offense in their country of origin. The Page Act was at the time of enactment the newest restrictive federal immigration and nationality law passed by Congress since the Alien Enemies Act of 1798.

The law was named after its sponsor, Representative Horace F. Page, a Republican representing California who introduced it to "end the danger of cheap Chinese labor and immoral Chinese women." The Page Act was supposed to strengthen the ban against "coolie" laborers, by imposing a fine of up to $2,000 and maximum jail sentence of one year upon anyone who tried to bring a person from Asia to the United States "without their free and voluntary consent, for the purpose of holding them to a term of service."

Only the ban on female East Asian immigrants was effectively and heavily enforced and proved to be a barrier for all East Asian women trying to immigrate, especially Chinese women. Moreover, the Page Act created the policing of immigrants around sexuality, which "gradually became extended to every immigrant who sought to enter America" and has remained a central feature of immigration restriction, according to some scholars.

In 1875, President Ulysses Grant delivered a Seventh Annual Message to the United States Senate and House of Representatives. President Grant reaffirmed the United States bearing regarding the immigration of women originating from the Far East.

While this is being done I invite the attention of Congress to another, though perhaps no less an evil—the importation of Chinese women, but few of whom are brought to our shores to pursue honorable or useful occupations.

Ulysses S. Grant

December 7, 1875

== Factors that influenced the creation of the Page Act ==
The first Chinese immigrants to the United States were mostly males, the majority of whom began arriving in 1848 as a part of the California Gold Rush. The California State Legislature assumed that Chinese men were forced to work under long-term service contracts, when in reality immigrants to America were not coolies, but borrowed money from brokers for their trip and paid the money back plus interest through work at their first job. Without enough money to send for their wives, a prostitution industry developed in the male Chinese immigrant community and became a serious issue to Americans living in San Francisco. Laws specifically directed at Chinese female immigrants were created even though prostitution was fairly common in the American West among many nationalities.

Both Chinese male "coolies" and Chinese female prostitutes were linked to slavery, which added to the American animosity toward them since slavery and involuntary servitude was abolished in 1865. Male laborers were central to the anti-Chinese movement, so one might expect legislators to focus on excluding men from immigration, but instead they concentrated on women in order to protect the American system of monogamy. Therefore, the number of immigrants (majority male) entering the U.S. from China during the Page Act's enforcement "exceeded the total for any other seven year period, before passage of the Exclusion Act in 1882, by at least thirteen thousand," but the female population dropped from 6.4% in 1870 to 4.6% in 1880.

Furthermore, the American Medical Association believed that Chinese immigrants "carried distinct germs to which they were immune but from which whites would die if exposed." That fear became concentrated on Chinese women because some white Americans believed that germs and disease could most easily be transmitted to white men through labor of Chinese prostitutes. Additionally, during difficult times in China, women and girls were sold into "domestic service, concubinage, or prostitution." Some Chinese men had a wife as well as a concubine, usually a lower class woman obtained through purchase and recognized as a legal member of the family. A woman's status depended on her relationship with Chinese men; "first wives enjoyed the highest status, followed by second wives and concubines, followed in turn by several classes of prostitutes." An additional concern was that the children of Chinese couples would become U.S. citizens under the Fourteenth Amendment and their cultural practices would become a part of American democracy. As a result, the Page Law responded to "what were believed to be serious threats to white values, lives, and futures." California state laws could not exclude women for being Chinese, so they were crafted as regulations of public morals, but the laws were still struck down as "impermissible encroachment on federal immigration power." However, the Page Law sailed through Congress without any expressed concerns of having a federal law that racially restricted immigration or violated the Burlingame Treaty of 1868, which allowed the free migration and emigration of Chinese people, because Americans were focused on protecting the social ideals of marriage and morality.

== Implementation ==
The American consul in Hong Kong from 1875 to 1877, David H. Bailey, was put in charge of regulating which Chinese women were actual wives of laborers, allowed to travel to the United States, as opposed to prostitutes. Bailey set up the process with the Hong Kong authorities and the Tung Wah Hospital Committee, an "association of the most prominent Chinese businessmen in Hong Kong." Before a Chinese woman could immigrate to the United States she had to submit "an official declaration of purpose in emigration and personal morality statement, accompanied by an application for clearance and a fee to the American Consul." The declaration was then sent to the Tung Wah Hospital Committee who would do a careful examination and then report back to Bailey about the character of each woman. Also, a list of the potential emigrants was sent to the government in Hong Kong for investigation. In addition, the day before a ship sailed to America, Chinese women reported to the American consul for a series of questioning, which included the following questions:

Have you entered into contract or agreement with any person or persons whomsoever, for a term of service, within the United States for lewd and immoral purposes? Do you wish of your own free and voluntary will to go to the United States? Do you go to the United States for the purposes of prostitution? Are you married or single? What are you going to the United States for? What is to be your occupation there? Have you lived in a house of prostitution in Hong Kong, Macao, or China? Have you engaged in prostitution in either of the above places? Are you a virtuous woman? Do you intend to live a virtuous life in the United States? Do you know that you are at liberty now to go to the United States, or remain in your own country, and that you cannot be forced to go away from your home?

The Chinese women who "passed" these questions according to the American consul were then sent to be questioned by the harbor master on duty. He would ask the women the same questions in an effort to catch liars, but if the women were approved they were then allowed to board the steamer to America. Once on board the ship, the women were questioned again. The first year that Bailey was assigned to differentiate wives from prostitutes he did not yet have the assistance of the Tung Wah Hospital Committee, and 173 women were allowed to sail to California, he was disappointed with that figure and granted only 77 women passage in 1877. In 1878, under the authority of American consul Sheldon Loring, 354 women arrived in the U.S., a substantial number compared to John S. Mosby's grant of less than 200 women to be sent to the U.S. from 1879 to 1882. Upon their arrival in San Francisco, Colonel Bee, the American consul for the Chinese would observe the documents with photographs of each woman included and ask her the same questions she had heard in Hong Kong. If women changed their answers to the questions, did not match their pictures, or had incomplete paperwork, they could be detained, and sent back to Hong Kong. As a result, from 1875 to 1882 at least one hundred and possibly several hundred women were returned to China. The entire process was "shaped by the larger, explicit assumption" that Chinese women, like Chinese men, were dishonest.

Photographs were used as a means to identify the Chinese women through each stage of the examination process in order to ensure that unqualified women would not be substituted for a woman who was properly questioned at any point in time. Chinese women were subject to this method of identification prior to any other immigrant group because of the "threat of their sexuality to the United States." In addition to all the questioning that took place in regard to a woman's character, there were also detailed questions about Chinese women's fathers and husbands. Therefore, these women were subject to this because officials "accepted that male intentions and actions were more likely to determine a woman's sexual future than her own actions and intentions." Chinese women had to demonstrate that they grew up in respectable families and that their husbands could afford to support them in the United States. Also, "the appearance of the body and clothing supposedly offered a range of possible clues about inner character, on which some officials drew when trying to differentiate prostitutes from real wives." Bodily clues used to examine Chinese women included bound feet, "prettiness, youth, demeanor," and how they walked. However, the task of differentiating "real" wives from prostitutes was virtually impossible. Men, on the other hand, faced more lenient restriction practices and were not required to "carry photographs, nor to match photographs that had been sent in advance to San Francisco Port authorities."

== Effects on Chinese families and future immigrants to the U.S. ==
By forcing Chinese women to undergo invasive examinations to prove they were not sex workers, the Page Act effectively prevented immigration to the United States by Chinese women and resulted in a sharply skewed gender ratio in the Chinese-American community. This gender imbalance lasted until the mid-20th century.

Most Chinese women who immigrated to the U.S. in the 1860s and the 1870s were "second wives, concubines in polygamous marriages, or prostitutes," but not all Chinese women worked as prostitutes. Enforcement of the Page Act resulted not only in fewer prostitutes but also the "virtually complete exclusion of Chinese women from the United States." In 1882 alone, during the few months before the enactment of the Chinese Exclusion Act of 1882 and the beginning of its enforcement, 39,579 Chinese entered the U.S., only 136 of them women. Therefore, Chinese immigrants were unable to create families with each other within the U.S. The Page Act was so successful in preventing Chinese women from immigrating and consequently keeping the ratio of females to males low that the law "paradoxically encouraged the very vice it purported to be fighting: prostitution." Not until after World War II was an appropriate sex balance established because between 1946 and 1952, almost 90% of all Chinese immigrants were women.

The sojourner mentality of the Chinese limited the number of wives who chose to immigrate as did the financial cost of the trip; however, documents relating to the enforcement of the Page Act suggest that some women were able to overcome these barriers and join their husbands, but without this law, the numbers would have been far higher. According to historian George Peffer, "all the evidence suggests that the women who survived this ordeal were most likely the wives of Chinese laborers" because they would have possessed the determination needed to endure the questioning, while importers of prostitutes "might have been reluctant to risk prosecution." Yet, this is difficult to conclusively prove, especially since Peffer himself noted that the cost of immigration as well as possible bribes paid to American consuls would have created a greater hardship for the "wives of immigrants who possessed limited resources, than for the wealthy tongs" who sent prostitutes to the U.S. Therefore, although the Chinese Exclusion Act was extremely important in transforming the Chinese into a "declining immigrant group, it was the Page Law that exacerbated the problem of life without families in America's Chinatowns."

== See also ==
- Chinese Exclusion Act
