= Campbell Polson Berry =

American politician (1834–1901)

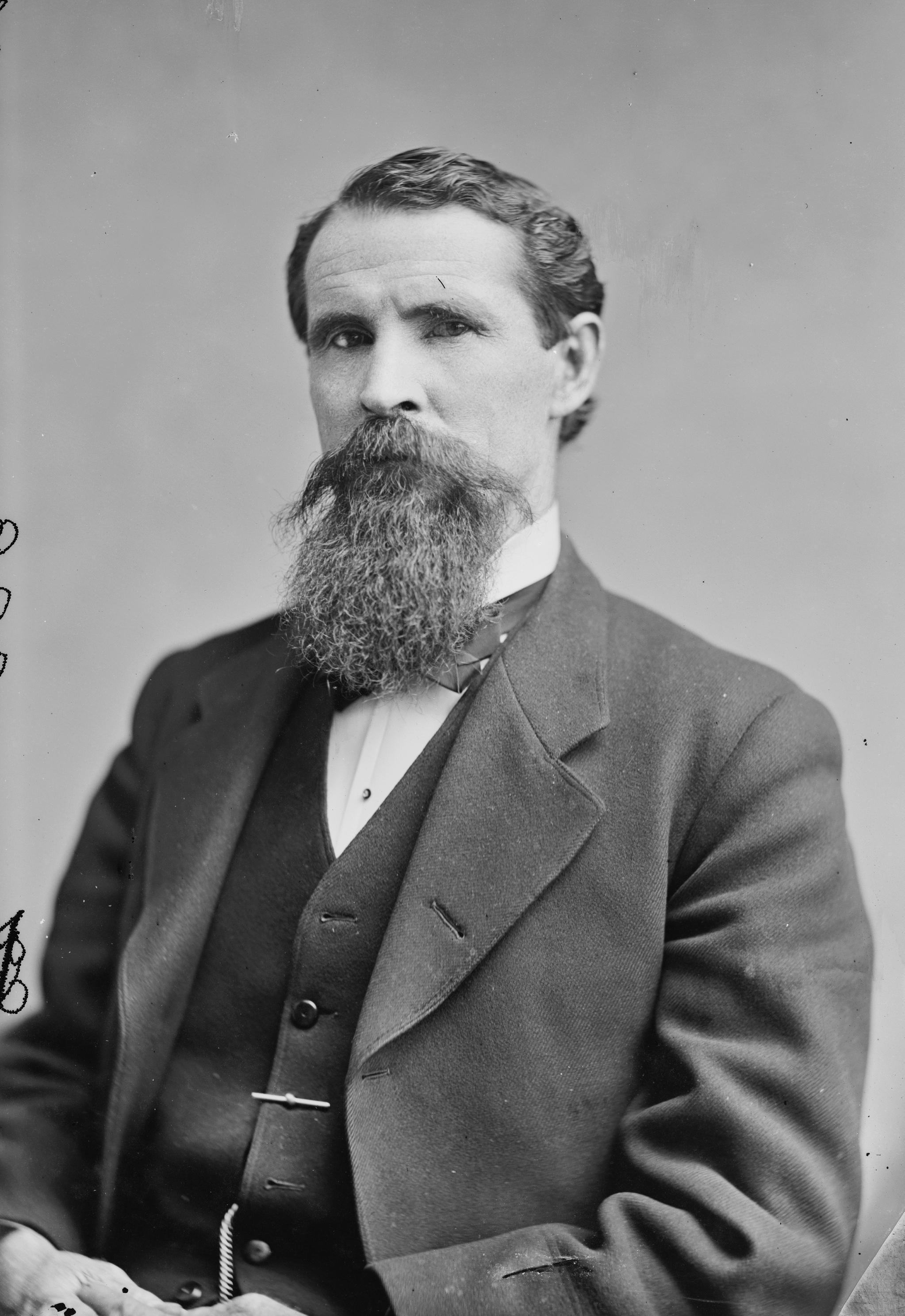

Member of the U.S. House of Representatives from California's 3rd district
- In office March 4, 1879 – March 3, 1883
- Preceded by: John K. Luttrell
- Succeeded by: Barclay Henley

22nd Speaker of the California State Assembly
- In office December 1877 – April 1878
- Preceded by: Gideon J. Carpenter
- Succeeded by: Jabez F. Cowdery

Member of the California State Assembly
- In office 1869–1878
- Constituency: 25th district (1875–1878)
- Constituency: 23rd district (1869–1875)

Personal details
- Born: November 7, 1834 Jackson County, Alabama, U.S.
- Died: January 8, 1901 (aged 66) Wheatland, California, U.S.
- Party: Democratic

Campbell Polson Berry (November 7, 1834 – January 8, 1901) was a Democratic politician from California. He served in the California State Assembly from 1869 to 1873 and again from 1875 to 1880, representing Sutter County, and became Speaker of the Assembly in 1877–78. He later served in the U.S. House of Representatives, representing California's 3rd District for two terms from 1879 to 1883.

== Early life ==
Born in Jackson County, Alabama; Berry moved with his parents to Berryville, Arkansas in 1841. He attended grammar school in Berryville, and moved to California in 1848, settling near Yuba City.

=== Career ===
Berry engaged in agricultural pursuits and worked in the mercantile business before being elected to the California State Assembly in the 1868 election. For a year, Berry served as the Speaker of the California State Assembly for one year before his election the U.S. House of Representatives in 1878.

In 1882, Berry declined to be a candidate for renomination and was succeeded by Democrat Barclay Henley.

=== Death ===
In 1901, Berry died. He is interred in Fairview Cemetery in Sutter County, California.

== Electoral history ==
1879 United States House of Representatives elections in California, District 3
Party	Candidate	Votes	%
Democratic	Campbell Polson Berry	20,019	50.2
Republican	Joseph McKenna	19,800	49.6
Workingman's	George T. Elliott	93	0.2
Total votes		39,912	100.0
Democratic hold			

1880 United States House of Representatives elections in California, District 3
Party	Candidate	Votes	%
Democratic	Campbell Polson Berry (Incumbent)	21,743	51.1
Republican	George A. Knight	20,494	48.2
Independent	W. A. Howe	172	0.4
Greenback	A. Musselman	85	0.2
Independent	A. G. Clark	26	0.1
Total votes		42,520	100.0
Democratic hold			

Political offices
Preceded by B. R. Spilman	California State Assemblyman, 23rd District (Sutter County seat); 1869–1873	Succeeded by Augustus L. Chandler
Preceded by John Simpson	California State Assemblyman, 25th District; 1875–1880	Succeeded by Augustus L. Chandler
Preceded by Gideon J. Carpenter	Speaker of the California State Assembly; December 1877 – April 1878	Succeeded by Jabez F. Cowdery
U.S. House of Representatives
Preceded by John K. Luttrell	Member of the U.S. House of Representatives from California's 3rd congressional district 1879–1883	Succeeded by Barclay Henley
