= Gideon J. Carpenter =

American politician

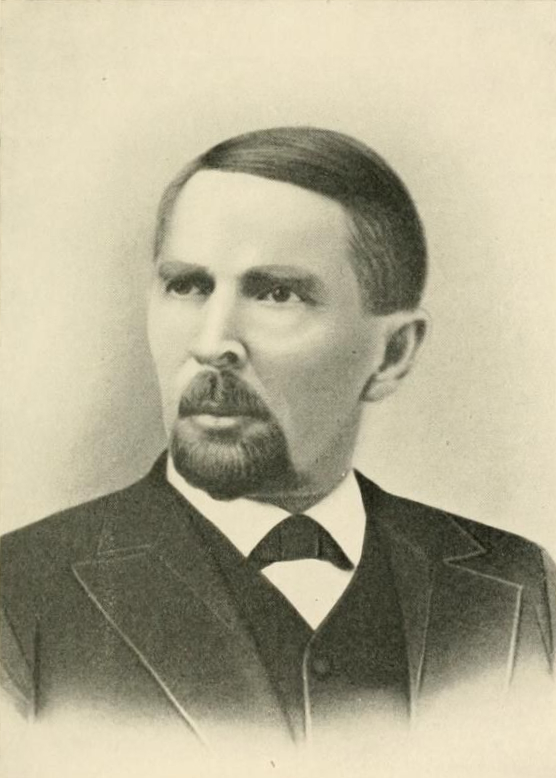

21st Speaker of the California State Assembly
- In office December 1875–April 1876
- Preceded by: Morris M. Estee
- Succeeded by: Campbell Polson Berry

Member of the California State Assembly from the 23rd district
- In office 1875–1878

Member of the California State Senate from the 18th district
- In office 1856–1860

Personal details
- Born: Gideon Judd Carpenter; May 4, 1823 Harford, Pennsylvania, U.S.
- Died: May 6, 1910 (age 87) Placerville, California, U.S.
- Party: Democratic
- Spouse: Mary A. Whitney
- Children: 4
- Relatives: Cyrus C. Carpenter (brother)
- Other offices: Clerk of El Dorado County; District Attorney of El Dorado County

Gideon Judd Carpenter (May 4, 1823 - May 6, 1910) was a Democratic politician who served in the California State Senate and Assembly, also serving as the Speaker of the Assembly between 1875 and 1876. He was also the county clerk and district attorney of El Dorado County.

== Life ==
Carpenter was born in Harford, Pennsylvania in 1823 and was the younger brother of future Governor of Iowa and Congressman Cyrus C. Carpenter. He moved to California in 1850 and became a miner in the Big Bar area of the Middle Fork American River but later shifted his focus to practicing law and being involved in politics.

=== Political career ===
Engraving of Carpenter published 1858

Carpenter was elected to the California State Senate from the 18th District in 1856 and served until 1860. He was then county clerk and district attorney of El Dorado County in California during the 1860s.

He returned to the state legislature when he was elected to the California State Assembly from the 23rd District in 1875, and was elected Speaker of the Assembly in the same year. In 1876 Carpenter stepped down from the Assembly to become the Democratic nominee in the 2nd Congressional District, but was defeated in the general election by Republican incumbent Horace F. Page.

After losing the congressional race, Carpenter was a reporter for the California Supreme Court until 1880. In 1882, he was elected to a single four-year term on the California Railroad Commission, now the California Public Utilities Commission.

=== Later life ===
In 1889, Carpenter purchased the Placerville Mountain Democrat, a newspaper, alongside George E. Williams and became the sole owner in 1891. Carpenter's son died in 1902, and Carpenter himself died in 1910 in Placerville.

Preceded by Morris M. Estee	Speaker of the California State Assembly; December 1875–April 1876	Succeeded by Campbell Polson Berry
