= Horace F. Page =

American politician and lawyer (1833–1890)

Horace Francis Page
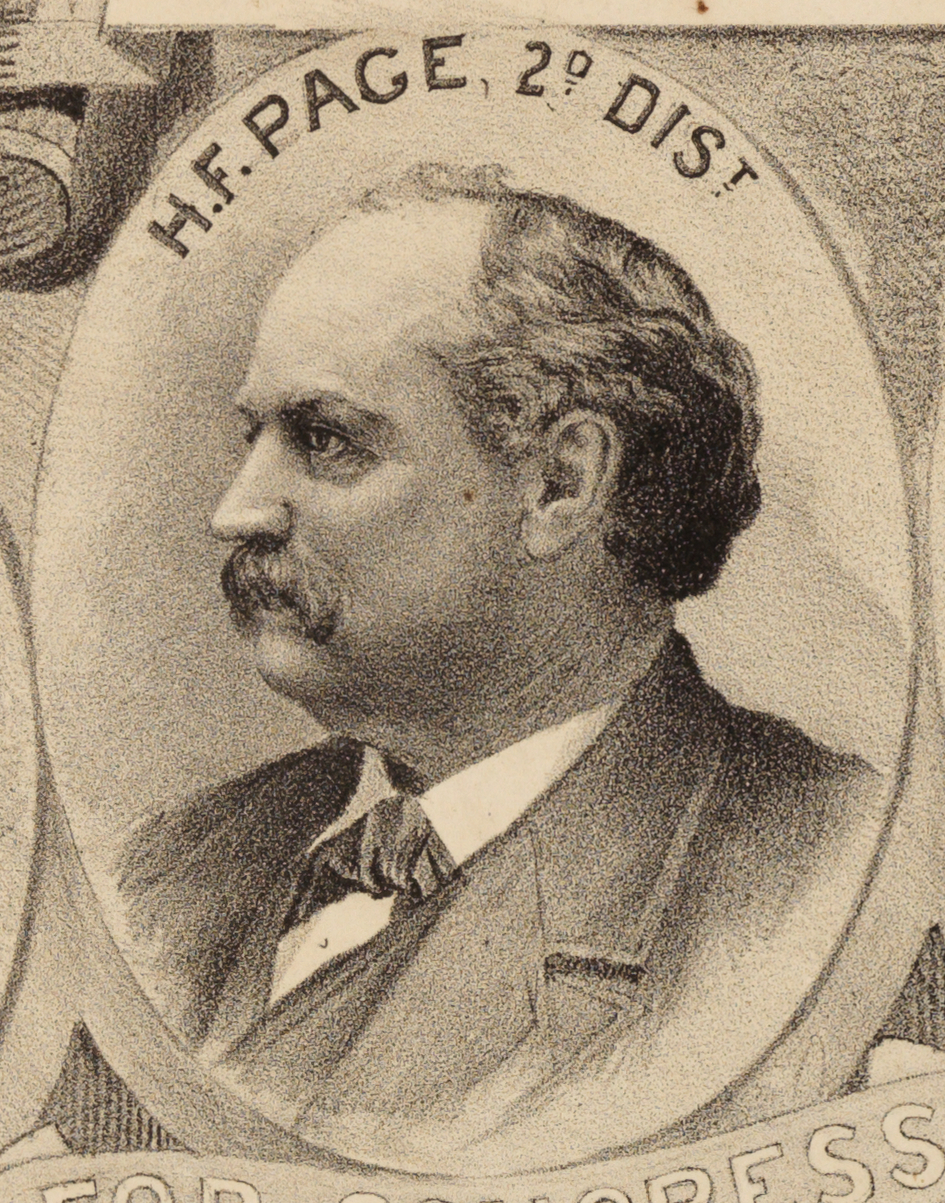
- Engraving by Britton & Rey from a photograph by G. D. Morse, 1882

Member of the U.S. House of Representatives from California's 2nd district
- In office March 4, 1873 – March 3, 1883
- Preceded by: Aaron A. Sargent
- Succeeded by: James Budd

Personal details
- Born: Horace Francis Page; October 20, 1833 Medina, New York, U.S.
- Died: August 23, 1890 (aged 56) San Francisco, California, U.S.
- Resting place: Mountain View Cemetery, Oakland, California
- Party: Republican
- Profession: Attorney

Horace Francis Page (October 20, 1833 – August 23, 1890) was a 19th-century American lawyer and politician who represented California in the United States House of Representatives for five terms between 1873 and 1883.

He is perhaps best known for the Page Act of 1875 which began the racial prohibitions against Asian, primarily Chinese, immigration.

== Biography ==
Page was born near Medina, Orleans County, New York. He attended public schools and Millville Academy and then taught school in La Porte County, Indiana until 1854. He then moved to California and engaged in the sawmill business near Colfax. He moved to Placerville and engaged in the livery-stable business. He became engaged in mining, as a mail contractor, and as a stage proprietor.

Horace Page studied law, was admitted to the bar, and commenced practice in California.

=== Early career ===
He was an unsuccessful Republican candidate for state senate in 1869.

He served as a major in the California Militia.

=== Congress ===
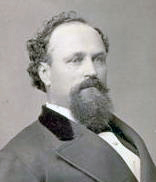
Page, undated

Page was elected as a Republican to the 43rd United States Congress and the four succeeding Congresses. He served from March 4, 1873, to March 3, 1883. During the 47th United States Congress, he was the chairman of the Committee on Commerce. In 1882.

Page introduced the Chinese Exclusion Act to the House. When arguing for a ban on the immigration of Chinese laborers, he sought to win support from those who believed in white racial superiority, telling his fellow members that "there is not a member upon this floor... who believes that the coming of the African race... was a blessing to us or to the African himself."

He was an unsuccessful candidate for re-election to the 48th United States Congress.

=== Later career and death ===
In 1884 Horace Page was a delegate to the Republican National Convention. He resumed the practice of law in Washington DC. He died in San Francisco, and was interred in Mountain View Cemetery, Oakland, California.

== Election results ==
1872 United States House of Representatives elections in California, 2nd district
| Party | Candidate | Votes | % |
|---|---|---|---|
| Republican | Horace F. Page | 13,803 | 51.9 |
| Democratic | Pasz Coggins | 12,816 | 48.1 |
| Total votes | | 26,619 | 100.0 |
| Turnout | | | |
| Republican hold | | | |

1875 United States House of Representatives elections in California, 2nd district
| Party | Candidate | Votes | % |
|---|---|---|---|
| Republican | Horace F. Page (incumbent) | 13,624 | 43.4 |
| Democratic | Hy Larkin | 12,154 | 38.8 |
| Independent | Charles R. Tuttle | 5,589 | 17.8 |
| Total votes | | 31,367 | 100.0 |
| Turnout | | | |
| Republican hold | | | |

1876 United States House of Representatives elections in California, 2nd district
| Party | Candidate | Votes | % |
|---|---|---|---|
| Republican | Horace F. Page (incumbent) | 20,815 | 56.7 |
| Democratic | G. J. Carpenter | 15,916 | 43.3 |
| Total votes | | 36,731 | 100.0 |
| Turnout | | | |
| Republican hold | | | |

1879 United States House of Representatives elections in California, 2nd district
| Party | Candidate | Votes | % |
|---|---|---|---|
| Republican | Horace F. Page (incumbent) | 19,386 | 51.9 |
| Democratic | Thomas J. Clunie | 12,847 | 34.4 |
| Workingman's | H. B. Williams | 5,139 | 13.8 |
| Total votes | | 37,372 | 100.0 |
| Turnout | | | |
| Republican hold | | | |

1880 United States House of Representatives elections in California, 2nd district
| Party | Candidate | Votes | % |
|---|---|---|---|
| Republican | Horace F. Page (incumbent) | 22,038 | 53.6 |
| Democratic | John R. Glasscock | 18,859 | 45.9 |
| Greenback | Benjamin Todd | 296 | 0.4 |
| Prohibition | B. K. Lowe | 41 | 0.1 |
| Total votes | | 41,118 | 100.0 |
| Turnout | | | |
| Republican hold | | | |

=== 1882 ===
1882 United States House of Representatives elections in California, 2nd district
| Party | Candidate | Votes | % |
|---|---|---|---|
| Democratic | James Budd | 20,229 | 50.5 |
| Republican | Horace F. Page (incumbent) | 19,246 | 48.1 |
| Prohibition | J. L. Coles | 478 | 1.2 |
| Greenback | F. J. Woodward | 78 | 0.2 |
| Total votes | | 40,031 | 100.0 |
| Turnout | | | |
| Democratic gain from Republican | | | |

U.S. House of Representatives
| Preceded by Aaron Augustus Sargent | Member of the U.S. House of Representatives from California's 2nd congressional district 1873-1883 | Succeeded by James Budd |
