= California's 3rd congressional district =

U.S. House district for California

Coordinates: 38.9°N 122.0°W

- Interactive map of district boundaries
- Representative: Kevin Kiley; I–Roseville
- Population (2025): 810,585
- Median household income: $112,514
- Ethnicity: 69.1% White; 14.3% Hispanic; 7.4% Asian; 6.1% Two or more races; 1.5% Black; 0.9% Native American; 0.8% other
- Cook PVI: R+2

California's 3rd congressional district is a U.S. congressional district in California. It includes the northern Sierra Nevada and northeastern suburbs of Sacramento, stretching south to Death Valley. It encompasses Alpine, Inyo, Mono, Nevada, Placer (where the majority of the district's population lives), Plumas, and Sierra counties, as well as parts of El Dorado, Sacramento, and Yuba counties. It includes the Sacramento suburbs of Roseville (the district's largest city), Folsom, Orangevale, Rocklin, Auburn, and Lincoln, along with the mountain towns of Quincy, South Lake Tahoe, Truckee, Mammoth Lakes, and Bishop. The district is represented in the House of Representatives by the only independent in the House, Kevin Kiley, although he caucuses with the Republican Party.

Prior to redistricting in 2020, the 3rd district encompassed most of the Sacramento Valley north and west of Sacramento. It covered all of Colusa, Sutter and Yuba counties, most of Glenn, Lake, Solano and Yolo counties and a portion of Sacramento County. The district was represented by John Garamendi, a Democrat.

== Recent election results from statewide races ==
=== 2023–2027 boundaries ===
Year	Office	Results
2008	President	McCain 53% – 46%
2010	Governor	Whitman 54% – 41%
2010	Lt. Governor	Maldonado 54% – 36%
2010	Secretary of State	Dunn 52% – 40%
2010	Attorney General	Cooley 59% – 31%
2010	Treasurer	Walters 50% – 43%
2010	Controller	Chiang 47% – 45%
2012	President	Romney 56% – 42%
2014	Governor	Kashkari 52% – 48%
2016	President	Trump 50% – 42%
2018	Governor	Cox 56% – 44%
2018	Attorney General	Bailey 54% – 46%
2020	President	Trump 50% – 48%
2022	Senate (Reg.)	Meuser 54% – 46%
2022	Governor	Dahle 57% – 43%
2022	Lt. Governor	Underwood Jacobs 55% – 45%
2022	Secretary of State	Bernosky 55% – 45%
2022	Attorney General	Hochman 56% – 44%
2022	Treasurer	Guerrero 56% – 44%
2022	Controller	Chen 59% – 41%
2024	President	Trump 50% – 47%
2024	Senate (Reg.)	Garvey 54% – 46%

== Recent history ==
The 3rd district once extended up the Sacramento Valley from Sacramento to take in rural territory up to Tehama County. Once a Democratic bastion, the district was pushed into more rural and Republican-leaning territory after the 1990 census, and elected a Republican in 1998. The 2001 reapportionment made the district more compact and Republican than its predecessor, though it was far less Republican than the neighboring 4th district. Although there was some movement in registration in favor of the Democrats, it still had a strong GOP flavor as most of the Sacramento area's Democratic voters lived in the neighboring 5th district.

=== Presidential performance ===
While George W. Bush carried the district in 2004 with 58.2% of the vote, the district swung rapidly in the Democratic column in 2008 with Barack Obama narrowly winning a plurality with 49.28% of the vote over John McCain's 48.81%. However, despite Obama's win, in the congressional election held on the same day, the Republicans retained the seat.

=== Reapportionment ===
After redistricting, this district essentially became the 7th district, while a new 3rd was created with lines similar to what the old 3rd had in the 1990s. This version of the 3rd was considered a swing district, though the bulk of its population lives in Democratic-leaning areas in the outer Bay Area and in the closer-in suburbs of Sacramento.
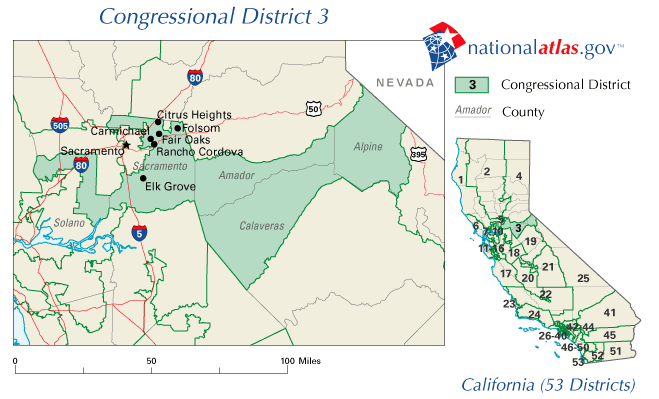

=== Election results from statewide races before 2012 ===
Election results from statewide races
Year	Office	Results
1992	President	Clinton (D) 40.9–37.2%
1992	Senator	Herschensohn (R) 45.2–44.2%
1992	Senator	Feinstein (D) 49.3–41.7%
1994	Governor	Wilson (R) 60.2–35.1%
1994	Senator	Feinstein (D) 46.7-44.8%
1996	President	Clinton (D) 45.2–44.4%
1998	Governor	Davis (D) 58.0-38.4%
1998	Senator	Boxer (D) 53.1-43.0%
2000	President	Bush (R) 51.1–43.6%
2000	Senator	Feinstein (D) 48.9–43.4%
2002	Governor	Simon (R) 54.5–34.0%
2003	Recall	✓ Yes 66.8–33.2%
2003	Recall	Schwarzenegger (R) 58.2–20.3%
2004	President	Bush (R) 58.2–40.8%
2004	Senator	Jones (R) 51.1–46.7%
2006	Governor	Schwarzenegger (R) 68.6–26.8%
2006	Senator	Feinstein (D) 48.8–46.1%
2008	President	Obama (D) 49.3–48.8%
2010	Governor	Brown (D) 47.6–47.4%
2010	Senator	Fiorina (R) 52.9–40.7%

== Composition ==
FIPS County Code	County	Seat	Population
3	Alpine	Markleeville	1,141
17	El Dorado	Placerville	192,215
27	Inyo	Independence	18,527
51	Mono	Bridgeport	13,066
57	Nevada	Nevada City	102,037
61	Placer	Auburn	423,561
63	Plumas	Quincy	19,131
67	Sacramento	Sacramento	1,584,288
91	Sierra	Downieville	3,200
115	Yuba	Marysville	85,722

Under the 2020 redistricting, California's 3rd congressional district was located in the Sierra Nevada region, encompassing Alpine, Inyo, Mono, Nevada, Placer, Plumas, and Sierra Counties, as well as parts of El Dorado, Sacramento, and Yuba Counties.

The area in El Dorado County includes the city of South Lake Tahoe; and the census-designated places Auburn Lake Trails, Camino, Georgetown, Grizzly Flats, Meyers, and Pollock Pines. The area in Sacramento County includes the city of Folsom and the census-designated place Orangevale. The area in Yuba County includes the census-designated places Challenge-Brownsville, Comptonville, Dobbins, Loma Rica, and Smartsville.

=== Geography ===
El Dorado County is split between this district and the 5th district. They are partitioned by Scott Creek, Perry Creek, Perry Creek Rd, Rocky Bar Rd, Grizzly Flat Rd, Happy Valley Rd, Canon Creek, E16 Highway, Pleasant Valley Rd, Cedar Ravine Rd, Woodland Dr, Weber Creek, Highway 50, Chili Bar Reservoir, South Fork American River, Marshall Rd, Hastings Creek, Highway 49, Pilot Creek, North Fork American River, and the Folsom Lake State Recreation Area.

Sacramento County is split between this district and both the 6th district and 7th district. The 6th and 3rd districts are partitioned by Latrobe Rd, Scott Rd, Deer Creek, Carson Creek, Nimbus Rd, E3 Highway, Illinois Ave, Madison Ave, Kenneth Ave, Wachtel Way, and Old Auburn Rd.

Yuba County is split between this district and the 1st district. They are partitioned by State Highway 70, Ellis Rd, and Union Pacific.

=== Cities and CDPs with 10,000 or more people ===
- Roseville – 147,773
- Folsom – 80,454
- Rocklin – 71,601
- Lincoln – 49,757
- Orangevale – 35,569
- Fair Oaks – 32,514
- South Lake Tahoe – 21,330
- Granite Bay – 21,247
- Truckee – 16,729
- Grass Valley – 14,016
- Auburn – 13,776
- North Auburn – 13,452

=== 2,500 – 10,000 people ===
- Alta Sierra – 7,204
- Mammoth Lakes – 7,191
- Pollock Pines – 7,112
- Loomis – 6,836
- Lake Wildwood – 5,158
- Lake of the Pines – 4,301
- Bishop – 3,819
- Kings Beach – 3,563
- Auburn Lake Trails – 3,388
- Meadow Vista – 3,263
- Nevada City – 3,152
- Dixon Lane-Meadow Creek – 2,780
- West Bishop – 2,754

== Future composition ==
Beginning with the 2026 election, the 3rd district will consist of the following counties:

- El Dorado (part)
- Nevada
- Placer (part)
- Sacramento (part)

== List of members representing the district ==
Member	Party	Dates	Cong ress	Electoral history	Counties
District created March 4, 1865
John Bidwell (Chico)	Republican	March 4, 1865 – March 3, 1867	39th	Elected in 1864. Retired.	1865–1885; Butte, Colusa, Del Norte, Humboldt, Lake, Lassen, Marin, Mendocino, Modoc, Napa, Plumas, Shasta, Sierra, Siskiyou, Solano, Sonoma, Sutter, Tehama, Trinity, Yolo, Yuba
James A. Johnson (Downieville)	Democratic	March 4, 1867 – March 3, 1871	40th 41st	Elected in 1867. Re-elected in 1868. Retired.	1865–1885; Butte, Colusa, Del Norte, Humboldt, Lake, Lassen, Marin, Mendocino, Modoc, Napa, Plumas, Shasta, Sierra, Siskiyou, Solano, Sonoma, Sutter, Tehama, Trinity, Yolo, Yuba
John M. Coghlan (Suisun City)	Republican	March 4, 1871 – March 3, 1873	42nd	Elected in 1871. Lost re-election.	1865–1885; Butte, Colusa, Del Norte, Humboldt, Lake, Lassen, Marin, Mendocino, Modoc, Napa, Plumas, Shasta, Sierra, Siskiyou, Solano, Sonoma, Sutter, Tehama, Trinity, Yolo, Yuba
John K. Luttrell (Santa Rosa)	Democratic	March 4, 1873 – March 3, 1879	43rd 44th 45th	Elected in 1872. Re-elected in 1875. Re-elected in 1876. Retired.	1865–1885; Butte, Colusa, Del Norte, Humboldt, Lake, Lassen, Marin, Mendocino, Modoc, Napa, Plumas, Shasta, Sierra, Siskiyou, Solano, Sonoma, Sutter, Tehama, Trinity, Yolo, Yuba
Campbell P. Berry (Wheatville)	Democratic	March 4, 1879 – March 3, 1883	46th 47th	Elected in 1879. Re-elected in 1880. Retired.	1865–1885; Butte, Colusa, Del Norte, Humboldt, Lake, Lassen, Marin, Mendocino, Modoc, Napa, Plumas, Shasta, Sierra, Siskiyou, Solano, Sonoma, Sutter, Tehama, Trinity, Yolo, Yuba
Barclay Henley (Santa Rosa)	Democratic	March 4, 1883 – March 3, 1885	48th	Elected in 1882. Redistricted to the 1st district.	1865–1885; Butte, Colusa, Del Norte, Humboldt, Lake, Lassen, Marin, Mendocino, Modoc, Napa, Plumas, Shasta, Sierra, Siskiyou, Solano, Sonoma, Sutter, Tehama, Trinity, Yolo, Yuba
Joseph McKenna (Suisun City)	Republican	March 4, 1885 – March 28, 1892	49th 50th 51st 52nd	Elected in 1884. Re-elected in 1886. Re-elected in 1888. Re-elected in 1890. Resigned to become U.S. Circuit Judge.	1885–1895; Alameda, Contra Costa, Marin, Sacramento, Solano, Yolo
Vacant		March 28, 1892 – December 5, 1892	52nd		1885–1895; Alameda, Contra Costa, Marin, Sacramento, Solano, Yolo
Samuel G. Hilborn (Oakland)	Republican	December 5, 1892 – April 4, 1894	52nd 53rd	Lost election contest.	1885–1895; Alameda, Contra Costa, Marin, Sacramento, Solano, Yolo
Warren B. English (Oakland)	Democratic	April 4, 1894 – March 3, 1895	53rd	Won election contest. Lost re-election.	1895–1903; Alameda, Colusa, Contra Costa, Glenn, Lake, Solano, Yolo
Samuel G. Hilborn (Oakland)	Republican	March 4, 1895 – March 3, 1899	54th 55th	Elected in 1894. Re-elected in 1896. Lost renomination.	1895–1903; Alameda, Colusa, Contra Costa, Glenn, Lake, Solano, Yolo
Victor H. Metcalf (Oakland)	Republican	March 4, 1899 – July 1, 1904	56th 57th 58th	Elected in 1898. Re-elected in 1900. Re-elected in 1902. Resigned to become U.S. Secretary of Commerce and Labor.	1895–1903; Alameda, Colusa, Contra Costa, Glenn, Lake, Solano, Yolo
Victor H. Metcalf (Oakland)	Republican	March 4, 1899 – July 1, 1904	56th 57th 58th	Elected in 1898. Re-elected in 1900. Re-elected in 1902. Resigned to become U.S. Secretary of Commerce and Labor.	1903–1913; Alameda, Contra Costa, Solano
Vacant		July 1, 1904 – November 8, 1904	58th		1903–1913; Alameda, Contra Costa, Solano
Joseph R. Knowland (Alameda)	Republican	November 8, 1904 – March 3, 1913	58th 59th 60th 61st 62nd	Elected to finish Metcalf's term. Elected in 1904. Re-elected in 1906. Re-elected in 1908. Re-elected in 1910. Redistricted to the 6th district.	1903–1913; Alameda, Contra Costa, Solano
Charles F. Curry (Sacramento)	Republican	March 4, 1913 – October 10, 1930	63rd 64th 65th 66th 67th 68th 69th 70th 71st	Elected in 1912. Re-elected in 1914. Re-elected in 1916. Re-elected in 1918. Re-elected in 1920. Re-elected in 1922. Re-elected in 1924. Re-elected in 1926. Re-elected in 1928. Died.	1913–1933; Contra Costa, Napa, Sacramento, San Joaquin, Solano, Yolo
Vacant		October 11, 1930 – March 3, 1931	71st		1913–1933; Contra Costa, Napa, Sacramento, San Joaquin, Solano, Yolo
Charles F. Curry Jr. (Sacramento)	Republican	March 4, 1931 – March 3, 1933	72nd	Elected in 1930. Lost re-election.	1913–1933; Contra Costa, Napa, Sacramento, San Joaquin, Solano, Yolo
Frank H. Buck (Vacaville)	Democratic	March 4, 1933 – September 17, 1942	73rd 74th 75th 76th 77th	Elected in 1932. Re-elected in 1934. Re-elected in 1936. Re-elected in 1938. Re-elected in 1940. Died.	1933–1953; Napa, Sacramento, San Joaquin, Solano, Yolo
Vacant		September 17, 1942 – January 3, 1943	77th		1933–1953; Napa, Sacramento, San Joaquin, Solano, Yolo
J. Leroy Johnson (Stockton)	Republican	January 3, 1943 – January 3, 1953	78th 79th 80th 81st 82nd	Elected in 1942. Re-elected in 1944. Re-elected in 1946. Re-elected in 1948. Re-elected in 1950. Redistricted to the 11th district.	1933–1953; Napa, Sacramento, San Joaquin, Solano, Yolo
John E. Moss (Sacramento)	Democratic	January 3, 1953 – December 31, 1978	83rd 84th 85th 86th 87th 88th 89th 90th 91st 92nd 93rd 94th 95th	Elected in 1952. Re-elected in 1954. Re-elected in 1956. Re-elected in 1958. Re-elected in 1960. Re-elected in 1962. Re-elected in 1964. Re-elected in 1966. Re-elected in 1968. Re-elected in 1970. Re-elected in 1972. Re-elected in 1974. Re-elected in 1976. Retired; resigned before the term ended.	1953–1963; Colusa, Glenn, Sacramento, Sutter, Yolo, Yuba
John E. Moss (Sacramento)	Democratic	January 3, 1953 – December 31, 1978	83rd 84th 85th 86th 87th 88th 89th 90th 91st 92nd 93rd 94th 95th	Elected in 1952. Re-elected in 1954. Re-elected in 1956. Re-elected in 1958. Re-elected in 1960. Re-elected in 1962. Re-elected in 1964. Re-elected in 1966. Re-elected in 1968. Re-elected in 1970. Re-elected in 1972. Re-elected in 1974. Re-elected in 1976. Retired; resigned before the term ended.	1963–1967; Sacramento
John E. Moss (Sacramento)	Democratic	January 3, 1953 – December 31, 1978	83rd 84th 85th 86th 87th 88th 89th 90th 91st 92nd 93rd 94th 95th	Elected in 1952. Re-elected in 1954. Re-elected in 1956. Re-elected in 1958. Re-elected in 1960. Re-elected in 1962. Re-elected in 1964. Re-elected in 1966. Re-elected in 1968. Re-elected in 1970. Re-elected in 1972. Re-elected in 1974. Re-elected in 1976. Retired; resigned before the term ended.	1967–1975; Sacramento (Sacramento city)
John E. Moss (Sacramento)	Democratic	January 3, 1953 – December 31, 1978	83rd 84th 85th 86th 87th 88th 89th 90th 91st 92nd 93rd 94th 95th	Elected in 1952. Re-elected in 1954. Re-elected in 1956. Re-elected in 1958. Re-elected in 1960. Re-elected in 1962. Re-elected in 1964. Re-elected in 1966. Re-elected in 1968. Re-elected in 1970. Re-elected in 1972. Re-elected in 1974. Re-elected in 1976. Retired; resigned before the term ended.	1975–1983; Eastern two-thirds of Sacramento
Vacant		December 31, 1978 – January 3, 1979	95th		1975–1983; Eastern two-thirds of Sacramento
Bob Matsui (Sacramento)	Democratic	January 3, 1979 – January 3, 1993	96th 97th 98th 99th 100th 101st 102nd	Elected in 1978. Re-elected in 1980. Re-elected in 1982. Re-elected in 1984. Re-elected in 1986. Re-elected in 1988. Re-elected in 1990. Redistricted to the 5th district.	1975–1983; Eastern two-thirds of Sacramento
Bob Matsui (Sacramento)	Democratic	January 3, 1979 – January 3, 1993	96th 97th 98th 99th 100th 101st 102nd	Elected in 1978. Re-elected in 1980. Re-elected in 1982. Re-elected in 1984. Re-elected in 1986. Re-elected in 1988. Re-elected in 1990. Redistricted to the 5th district.	1983–1993; Sacramento (Sacramento city and eastern suburbs)
Vic Fazio (West Sacramento)	Democratic	January 3, 1993 – January 3, 1999	103rd 104th 105th	Redistricted from the 4th district and re-elected in 1992. Re-elected in 1994. Re-elected in 1996. Retired.	1993–2003; Southwestern Butte, Colusa, Glenn, northwestern Sacramento, eastern Solano, Sutter, Tehama, Yolo
Doug Ose (Sacramento)	Republican	January 3, 1999 – January 3, 2005	106th 107th 108th	Elected in 1998. Re-elected in 2000. Re-elected in 2002. Retired.	1993–2003; Southwestern Butte, Colusa, Glenn, northwestern Sacramento, eastern Solano, Sutter, Tehama, Yolo
Doug Ose (Sacramento)	Republican	January 3, 1999 – January 3, 2005	106th 107th 108th	Elected in 1998. Re-elected in 2000. Re-elected in 2002. Retired.	2003–2013 Alpine, Amador, Calaveras, most of suburban Sacramento, northern and eastern Solano
Dan Lungren (Gold River)	Republican	January 3, 2005 – January 3, 2013	109th 110th 111th 112th	Elected in 2004. Re-elected in 2006. Re-elected in 2008. Re-elected in 2010. Redistricted to the 7th district and lost re-election.	2003–2013 Alpine, Amador, Calaveras, most of suburban Sacramento, northern and eastern Solano
John Garamendi (Walnut Grove)	Democratic	January 3, 2013 – January 3, 2023	113th 114th 115th 116th 117th	Redistricted from the 10th district and re-elected in 2012. Re-elected in 2014. Re-elected in 2016. Re-elected in 2018. Re-elected in 2020. Redistricted to the 8th district.	2013–2023 North central California including Davis, Fairfield, and Yuba City
Kevin Kiley (Roseville)	Republican	January 3, 2023 – March 9, 2026	118th 119th	Elected in 2022. Re-elected in 2024. Redistricted to the 6th district and lost re-election.	2023–present Sierra Nevada region, including all of Alpine, Inyo, Mono, Nevada, Placer, Plumas, and Sierra and parts of El Dorado, Sacramento, and Yuba
Kevin Kiley (Roseville)	Independent	March 9, 2026 – present	118th 119th	Elected in 2022. Re-elected in 2024. Redistricted to the 6th district and lost re-election.	2023–present Sierra Nevada region, including all of Alpine, Inyo, Mono, Nevada, Placer, Plumas, and Sierra and parts of El Dorado, Sacramento, and Yuba
Ami Bera (Elk Grove)	Democratic	Assuming office on January 3, 2027		Redistricted from the 6th district and re-elected in 2026.	2023–present Sierra Nevada region, including all of Alpine, Inyo, Mono, Nevada, Placer, Plumas, and Sierra and parts of El Dorado, Sacramento, and Yuba

== Election results ==
=== 1864 ===
1864 United States House of Representatives elections in California, District 3
Party	Candidate	Votes	%
Republican	John Bidwell	18,255	56.1
Democratic	Jack Temple	14,273	43.9
Total votes		32,528	100.0
Republican hold			

=== 1867 ===
1867 United States House of Representatives elections in California, District 3
Party	Candidate	Votes	%
Democratic	James A. Johnson	14,767	50.6
Republican	Chancellor Hartson	14,394	49.4
Total votes		29,161	100.0
Democratic gain from Republican			

=== 1868 ===
1868 United States House of Representatives elections in California, District 3
Party	Candidate	Votes	%
Democratic	James A. Johnson (Incumbent)	15,792	50.4
Republican	Chancellor Hartson	15,528	49.6
Total votes		31,320	100.0
Democratic hold			

=== 1871 ===
1871 United States House of Representatives elections in California, District 3
Party	Candidate	Votes	%
Republican	John M. Coghlan	18,503	51.7
Democratic	George Pearce	17,309	48.3
Total votes		35,812	100.0
Republican gain from Democratic			

=== 1872 ===
1872 United States House of Representatives elections in California, District 3
Party	Candidate	Votes	%
Democratic	John K. Luttrell	14,032	51.7
Republican	John M. Coghlan (Incumbent)	13,105	48.3
Total votes		27,137	100.0
Democratic gain from Republican			

=== 1875 ===
1875 United States House of Representatives elections in California, District 3
Party	Candidate	Votes	%
Democratic	John K. Luttrell (Incumbent)	18,468	55.1
Republican	C. B. Denio	8,284	24.7
Independent	Charles F. Reed	6,761	20.2
Total votes		33,513	100.0
Democratic hold			

=== 1876 ===
1876 United States House of Representatives elections in California, District 3
Party	Candidate	Votes	%
Democratic	John K. Luttrell (Incumbent)	19,846	51.1
Republican	Joseph McKenna	18,990	48.9
Total votes		38,836	100.0
Democratic hold			

=== 1879 ===
1879 United States House of Representatives elections in California, District 3
Party	Candidate	Votes	%
Democratic	Campbell Polson Berry	20,019	50.2
Republican	Joseph McKenna	19,800	49.6
Workingman's	George T. Elliott	93	0.2
Total votes		39,912	100.0
Democratic hold			

=== 1880 ===
1880 United States House of Representatives elections in California, District 3
Party	Candidate	Votes	%
Democratic	Campbell Polson Berry (Incumbent)	21,743	51.1
Republican	George A. Knight	20,494	48.2
Independent	W. A. Howe	172	0.4
Greenback	A. Musselman	85	0.2
Independent	A. G. Clark	26	0.1
Total votes		42,520	100.0
Democratic hold			

=== 1882 ===
1882 United States House of Representatives elections in California, District 3
Party	Candidate	Votes	%
Democratic	Barclay Henley	21,807	51.3
Republican	John J. De Haven	19,473	45.8
Prohibition	H. S. Graves	862	2.0
Greenback	W. Howe	401	0.9
Total votes		42,543	100.0
Democratic hold			

=== 1884 ===
1884 United States House of Representatives elections in California, District 3
Party	Candidate	Votes	%
Republican	Joseph McKenna	17,435	55.8
Democratic	John R. Glascock (Incumbent)	13,197	42.3
Prohibition	Joshua B. Wills	322	1.0
Populist	A. B. Burns	273	0.9
Total votes		31,227	100.0
Republican win (new seat)			

=== 1886 ===
1886 United States House of Representatives elections in California, District 3
Party	Candidate	Votes	%
Republican	Joseph McKenna (Incumbent)	15,801	53.0
Democratic	Henry C. McPike	13,277	44.5
Prohibition	W. W. Smith	707	2.4
Independent	W. J. Cuthbertson	32	0.1
Total votes		29,817	100.0
Republican hold			

=== 1888 ===
1888 United States House of Representatives elections in California, District 3
Party	Candidate	Votes	%
Republican	Joseph McKenna (Incumbent)	19,912	56.0
Democratic	Ben Morgan	14,633	41.2
Prohibition	W. W. Smith	657	1.9
Know Nothing	S. Solon Hall	338	1.0
Total votes		35,540	100.0
Republican hold			

=== 1890 ===
1890 United States House of Representatives elections in California, District 3
Party	Candidate	Votes	%
Republican	Joseph McKenna (Incumbent)	20,834	55.4
Democratic	John P. Irish	15,997	42.5
Prohibition	O. O. Felkner	774	2.1
Total votes		37,605	100.0
Republican hold			

=== 1892 (Special) ===
1892 United States House of Representatives elections in California, District 3
Party	Candidate	Votes	%
Republican	Samuel G. Hilborn	13,163	43.2
Democratic	Warren B. English	13,138	43.1
Populist	J. L. Lyon	3,495	11.5
Prohibition	L. B. Scranton	671	2.2
Total votes		30,467	100.0
Republican hold			

=== 1894 ===
1894 United States House of Representatives elections in California, District 3
Party	Candidate	Votes	%
Republican	Samuel G. Hilborn	15,795	45.5
Democratic	Warren B. English (Incumbent)	13,103	37.8
Populist	W. A. Vann	5,162	14.9
Prohibition	L. B. Scranton	637	1.8
Total votes		34,697	100.0
Republican gain from Democratic			

=== 1896 ===
1896 United States House of Representatives elections in California, District 3
Party	Candidate	Votes	%
Republican	Samuel Hilborn (Incumbent)	19,778	54.0
Democratic	Warren B. English	16,119	44.0
Socialist	John H. Eustice	387	1.1
Prohibition	W. Shafer	327	0.9
Total votes		36,611	100.0
Republican hold			

=== 1898 ===
1898 United States House of Representatives elections in California, District 3
Party	Candidate	Votes	%
Republican	Victor H. Metcalf	20,592	57.3
Democratic	John A. Jones	14,051	39.1
Socialist Labor	Thomas F. Burns	1,309	3.6
Total votes		35,952	100.0
Republican hold			

=== 1900 ===
1900 United States House of Representatives elections in California, District 3
Party	Candidate	Votes	%
Republican	Victor H. Metcalf (Incumbent)	22,109	58.9
Democratic	Frank Freeman	14,408	38.4
Socialist	R. A. Dague	596	1.6
Prohibition	Alvin W. Holt	431	1.1
Total votes		37,544	100.0
Republican hold			

=== 1902 ===
1902 United States House of Representatives elections in California, District 3
Party	Candidate	Votes	%
Republican	Victor H. Metcalf (Incumbent)	20,532	66.2
Democratic	Calvin B. White	8,574	27.7
Socialist	M. W. Wilkins	1,556	5.0
Prohibition	T. H. Montgomery	338	1.1
Total votes		31,000	100.0
Republican hold			

=== 1904 (Special) ===
1904 United States House of Representatives elections in California, District 3
Party	Candidate	Votes	%
Republican	Joseph R. Knowland (Incumbent)	24,637	68.6
Democratic	Henry C. McPike	7,210	20.1
Socialist	M. Lesser	3,617	10.1
Prohibition	Bates Morris	471	1.3
Total votes		35,935	100.0
Republican hold			

=== 1906 ===
1906 United States House of Representatives elections in California, District 3
Party	Candidate	Votes	%
Republican	Joseph R. Knowland (Incumbent)	21,510	60.0
Democratic	Hugh W. Brunk	7,716	21.5
Independence	Charles C. Boynton	3,614	10.1
Socialist	William McDevitt	2,514	7.0
Prohibition	T. H. Montgomery	482	1.4
Total votes		35,836	100.0
Republican hold			

=== 1908 ===
1908 United States House of Representatives elections in California, District 3
Party	Candidate	Votes	%
Republican	Joseph R. Knowland (Incumbent)	27,857	64.1
Democratic	George Peckham	9,889	22.8
Socialist	O. W. Philbrick	4,052	9.3
Independence	John A. Sands	923	2.1
Prohibition	T. H. Montgomery	717	1.7
Total votes		43,438	100.0
Republican hold			

=== 1910 ===
1910 United States House of Representatives elections in California, District 3
Party	Candidate	Votes	%
Republican	Joseph R. Knowland (Incumbent)	34,291	81.9
Socialist	S. Miller	6,653	15.9
Prohibition	James N. Christian	906	2.2
Total votes		41,850	100.0
Republican hold			

=== 1912 ===
1912 United States House of Representatives elections in California, District 3
Party	Candidate	Votes	%
Republican	Charles F. Curry	31,060	58.8
Democratic	Gilbert M. Ross	15,197	28.8
Socialist	William L. Wilson	6,522	12.4
Total votes		52,779	100.0
Republican hold			

=== 1914 ===
1914 United States House of Representatives elections in California, District 3
Party	Candidate	Votes	%
Republican	Charles F. Curry (Incumbent)	66,034	85.0
Socialist	David T. Ross	6,752	8.7
Prohibition	Edwin F. Van Vlear	4,911	6.3
Total votes		77,697	100.0
Republican hold			

=== 1916 ===
1916 United States House of Representatives elections in California, District 3
Party	Candidate	Votes	%
Republican	Charles F. Curry (Incumbent)	48,193	66.7
Democratic	O. W. Kennedy	16,900	23.4
Socialist	Ben Cooper	4,455	6.2
Prohibition	Edwin F. Van Vlear	2,694	3.7
Total votes		72,242	100.0
Republican hold			

=== 1918 ===
1918 United States House of Representatives elections in California, District 3
Party	Candidate	Votes	%
Republican	Charles F. Curry (Incumbent)	51,690	91.6
Socialist	Allen K. Gifford	4,746	8.4
Total votes		56,436	100.0
Republican hold			

=== 1920 ===
United States House of Representatives elections
Party	Candidate	Votes	%
Republican	Charles F. Curry (Incumbent)	54,984	74.7
Democratic	J. W. Struckenbruck	14,964	20.4
Socialist	Miles William Beck	3,631	4.9
Total votes		73,579	100.0
Republican hold			

=== 1922 ===
United States House of Representatives elections
Party	Candidate	Votes	%
Republican	Charles F. Curry (Incumbent)	71,316	91.6
Socialist	Marcus H. Steely	6,561	8.4
Total votes		77,877	100.0
Republican hold			

=== 1924 ===
United States House of Representatives elections
Party	Candidate	Votes	%
Republican	Charles F. Curry (Incumbent)	61,512	80.7
Socialist	James H. Barkley	14,665	19.3
Total votes		76,177	100.0
Republican hold			

=== 1926 ===
United States House of Representatives elections
Party	Candidate	Votes	%
Republican	Charles F. Curry (Incumbent)	72,912	100.0
Republican hold			

=== 1928 ===
United States House of Representatives elections
Party	Candidate	Votes	%
Republican	Charles F. Curry (Incumbent)	77,750	100.0
Republican hold			

=== 1930 ===
United States House of Representatives elections
Party	Candidate	Votes	%
Republican	Charles F. Curry Jr.	43,336	53.4
Republican	J. M. Inman	26,785	33.0
Democratic	Frank H. Buck	9,172	11.3
Independent	Katherine Braddock	1,753	2.2
Independent	E. M. Turner	49	0.1
Total votes		80,095	100.0
Republican hold			

=== 1932 ===
United States House of Representatives elections
Party	Candidate	Votes	%
Democratic	Frank H. Buck	61,694	56.8
Republican	Charles F. Curry (Incumbent)	46,887	43.2
Total votes		108,581	100.0
Democratic gain from Republican			

=== 1934 ===
United States House of Representatives elections
Party	Candidate	Votes	%
Democratic	Frank H. Buck (Incumbent)	66,566	53.3
Republican	J. M. Inman	56,222	45.7
Communist	Albert Hougardy	1,167	1.0
Total votes		122,955	100.0
Democratic hold			

=== 1936 ===
United States House of Representatives elections
Party	Candidate	Votes	%
Democratic	Frank H. Buck (Incumbent)	93,110	90.6
Independent	Walter Schaefer (write-in)	5,310	5.2
Communist	Perry Hill	4,390	4.2
Total votes		98,810	100.0
Democratic hold			

=== 1938 ===
United States House of Representatives elections
Party	Candidate	Votes	%
Democratic	Frank H. Buck (Incumbent)	119,236	93.3
Communist	Nora Conklin	8,271	6.5
Independent	Walter Schaefer (write-in)	327	0.2
Total votes		127,834	100.0
Democratic hold			

=== 1940 ===
United States House of Representatives elections
Party	Candidate	Votes	%
Democratic	Frank H. Buck (Incumbent)	135,461	91.0
Prohibition	C. H. Farman	10,539	7.1
Communist	Charles Gricus	2,751	1.8
No party	George Kimber (write-in)	122	0.1
Total votes		148,873	100.0
Democratic hold			

=== 1942 ===
United States House of Representatives elections
Party	Candidate	Votes	%
Republican	Justin L. Johnson (Incumbent)	63,982	54.5
Democratic	Joseph B. O'Neil	53,521	45.5
Total votes		117,503	100.0
Republican hold			

=== 1944 ===
United States House of Representatives elections
Party	Candidate	Votes	%
Republican	Justin L. Johnson (Incumbent)	131,705	100.0
Republican hold			

=== 1946 ===
United States House of Representatives elections
Party	Candidate	Votes	%
Republican	Justin L. Johnson (Incumbent)	116,792	100.0
Republican hold			

=== 1948 ===
United States House of Representatives elections
Party	Candidate	Votes	%
Republican	Justin L. Johnson (Incumbent)	166,571	84.4
Progressive	James B. "Bert" Willard	30,878	15.6
Total votes		197,449	100.0
Republican hold			

=== 1950 ===
United States House of Representatives elections
Party	Candidate	Votes	%
Republican	Justin L. Johnson (Incumbent)	177,269	100.0
Republican hold			

=== 1952 ===
United States House of Representatives elections
Party	Candidate	Votes	%
Democratic	John E. Moss	87,335	50.8
Republican	Leslie E. Wood	82,133	47.8
Progressive	Helen C. Thomsen	2,443	1.4
Total votes		171,911	100.0
Democratic hold			

=== 1954 ===
United States House of Representatives elections
Party	Candidate	Votes	%
Democratic	John E. Moss (Incumbent)	96,238	65.3
Republican	James H. Phillips	51,111	34.7
Total votes		147,349	100.0
Democratic hold			

=== 1956 ===
United States House of Representatives elections
Party	Candidate	Votes	%
Democratic	John E. Moss (Incumbent)	132,930	68.6
Republican	Noel C. Stevenson	60,889	31.4
Total votes		193,819	100.0
Democratic hold			

=== 1958 ===
United States House of Representatives elections
Party	Candidate	Votes	%
Democratic	John E. Moss (Incumbent)	169,727	100.0
Democratic hold			

=== 1960 ===
1960 United States House of Representatives elections
Party	Candidate	Votes	%
Democratic	John E. Moss (Incumbent)	200,439	100.0
Democratic hold			

=== 1962 ===
United States House of Representatives elections
Party	Candidate	Votes	%
Democratic	John E. Moss (Incumbent)	138,257	74.8
Republican	George W. G. Smith	46,510	25.2
Total votes		184,767	100.0
Democratic hold			

=== 1964 ===
United States House of Representatives elections
Party	Candidate	Votes	%
Democratic	John E. Moss (Incumbent)	166,688	74.3
Republican	Einer B. Gjelsteen	57,630	25.7
Total votes		224,318	100.0
Democratic hold			

=== 1966 ===
United States House of Representatives elections
Party	Candidate	Votes	%
Democratic	John E. Moss (Incumbent)	143,177	67.5
Republican	Terry G. Feil	69,057	32.5
Total votes		212,234	100.0
Democratic hold			

=== 1968 ===
United States House of Representatives elections
Party	Candidate	Votes	%
Democratic	John E. Moss (Incumbent)	106,694	56.0
Republican	Elmore J. Duffy	79,717	41.8
American Independent	James Tarleton Slaughter	4,188	2.2
Total votes		190,599	100.0
Democratic hold			

=== 1970 ===
United States House of Representatives elections
Party	Candidate	Votes	%
Democratic	John E. Moss (Incumbent)	117,496	61.6
Republican	Elmore J. Duffy	69,811	36.6
American Independent	Allen E. Priest	3,554	1.8
Total votes		190,861	100.0
Democratic hold			

=== 1972 ===
United States House of Representatives elections
Party	Candidate	Votes	%
Democratic	John E. Moss (Incumbent)	151,035	69.9
Republican	John Rakus	64,949	30.1
Total votes		215,984	100.0
Democratic hold			

=== 1974 ===
United States House of Representatives elections
Party	Candidate	Votes	%
Democratic	John E. Moss (Incumbent)	121,842	72.3
Republican	Ivaldo Lenci	46,585	27.7
Total votes		168,427	100.0
Democratic hold			

=== 1976 ===
United States House of Representatives elections
Party	Candidate	Votes	%
Democratic	John E. Moss (Incumbent)	139,779	72.9
Republican	George R. Marsh Jr.	52,075	27.1
Total votes		191,854	100.0
Democratic hold			

=== 1978 ===
United States House of Representatives elections
Party	Candidate	Votes	%
Democratic	Bob Matsui	105,537	53.4
Republican	Sandy Smoley	91,966	46.6
Total votes		197,503	100.0
Democratic hold			

=== 1980 ===
United States House of Representatives elections
Party	Candidate	Votes	%
Democratic	Robert Matsui (Incumbent)	170,670	70.6
Republican	Joseph Murphy	64,215	26.5
Libertarian	Bruce A. Daniel	6,980	2.9
Total votes		241,865	100.0
Democratic hold			

=== 1982 ===
United States House of Representatives elections
Party	Candidate	Votes	%
Democratic	Robert Matsui (Incumbent)	194,680	89.6
Libertarian	Bruce A. Daniel	16,222	7.5
Peace and Freedom	John Newmeyer	6,294	2.9
Total votes		217,196	100.0
Democratic hold			

=== 1984 ===
United States House of Representatives elections
Party	Candidate	Votes	%
Democratic	Robert Matsui (Incumbent)	131,369	100.0
Democratic hold			

=== 1986 ===
United States House of Representatives elections
Party	Candidate	Votes	%
Democratic	Robert Matsui (Incumbent)	158,709	75.9
Republican	Lowell Patrick Landowski	50,265	24.1
Total votes		208,974	100.0
Democratic hold			

=== 1988 ===
United States House of Representatives elections
Party	Candidate	Votes	%
Democratic	Robert Matsui (Incumbent)	183,470	71.2
Republican	Lowell Patrick Landowski	74,296	28.8
Total votes		257,766	100.0
Democratic hold			

=== 1990 ===
United States House of Representatives elections
Party	Candidate	Votes	%
Democratic	Robert Matsui (Incumbent)	132,143	60.3
Republican	Lowell Patrick Landowski	76,148	34.8
Libertarian	David M. McCann	10,797	4.9
Total votes		219,088	100.0
Democratic hold			

=== 1992 ===
United States House of Representatives elections
Party	Candidate	Votes	%
Democratic	Vic Fazio (Incumbent)	112,149	51.2
Republican	H. L. Richardson	96,092	40.3
Libertarian	Ross Crain	20,444	8.6
Total votes		228,685	100.0
Democratic hold			

=== 1994 ===
United States House of Representatives elections
Party	Candidate	Votes	%
Democratic	Vic Fazio (Incumbent)	97,093	49.75
Republican	Tim Lefever	89,964	46.10
Libertarian	Ross Crain	8,100	4.15
Total votes		195,157	100.0
Democratic hold			

=== 1996 ===
United States House of Representatives elections
Party	Candidate	Votes	%
Democratic	Vic Fazio (Incumbent)	118,663	53.6
Republican	Tim Lefever	91,134	41.1
Reform	Timothy Erich	7,701	3.4
Libertarian	Erin Donelle	4,239	1.9
Total votes		221,737	100.0
Democratic hold			

=== 1998 ===
United States House of Representatives elections
Party	Candidate	Votes	%
Republican	Doug Ose	100,621	52.41
Democratic	Sandie Dunn	86,471	45.04
Libertarian	Ross Crain	4,914	2.56
Total votes		192,006	100.0
Republican gain from Democratic			

=== 2000 ===
United States House of Representatives elections
Party	Candidate	Votes	%
Republican	Doug Ose (Incumbent)	129,254	56.2
Democratic	Bob Kent	93,067	40.4
Libertarian	Douglas Arthur Tuma	5,227	2.2
Natural Law	Channing E. Jones	2,634	1.1
Total votes		230,182	100.0
Republican hold			

=== 2002 ===
United States House of Representatives elections
Party	Candidate	Votes	%
Republican	Doug Ose (Incumbent)	117,466	62.4
Democratic	Howard Beeman	64,990	34.5
Libertarian	Douglas Arthur Tuma	5,847	3.1
Total votes		188,303	100.0
Republican hold			

=== 2004 ===
United States House of Representatives elections
Party	Candidate	Votes	%
Republican	Dan Lungren	177,113	61.9
Democratic	Gabe Castillo	99,750	34.9
Libertarian	Douglas Tuma	9,274	3.2
Total votes		286,137	100.0
Republican hold			

=== 2006 ===
United States House of Representatives elections
Party	Candidate	Votes	%
Republican	Dan Lungren (Incumbent)	135,709	59.5
Democratic	William E. Durston	86,318	37.8
Libertarian	Douglas A. Tuma	3,772	1.6
Peace and Freedom	Michael L. Roskey	2,370	1.0
Total votes		228,169	100.0
Republican hold			

=== 2008 ===
United States House of Representatives elections
Party	Candidate	Votes	%
Republican	Dan Lungren (Incumbent)	155,424	49.5
Democratic	William E. Durston	137,971	44.0
Libertarian	Douglas A. Tuma	7,273	2.3
Peace and Freedom	Dina J. Padilla	13,378	4.2
Total votes		314,046	100.0
Republican hold			

=== 2010 ===
United States House of Representatives elections
Party	Candidate	Votes	%
Republican	Dan Lungren (Incumbent)	131,169	50
Democratic	Ami Bera	113,128	43
American Independent	Jerry L. Leidecker	6,577	3%
Libertarian	Douglas Arthur Tuma	6,275	2%
Peace and Freedom	Mike Roskey	4,789	2%
Total votes		261,938	100
Republican hold			

=== 2012 ===
United States House of Representatives elections, 2012
Party	Candidate	Votes	%
Democratic	John Garamendi (Incumbent)	126,882	54.2%
Republican	Kim Vann	107,086	45.8%
Total votes		233,968	100.0%
Democratic hold			

=== 2014 ===
United States House of Representatives elections, 2014
Party	Candidate	Votes	%
Democratic	John Garamendi (Incumbent)	79,224	52.7%
Republican	Dan Logue	71,036	47.3%
Total votes		150,260	100.0%
Democratic hold			

=== 2016 ===
United States House of Representatives elections, 2016
Party	Candidate	Votes	%
Democratic	John Garamendi (Incumbent)	152,513	59.4%
Republican	Eugene Cleek	104,453	40.6%
Total votes		256,966	100.0%
Democratic hold			

=== 2018 ===
2018 United States House of Representatives elections in California, District 3
Party	Candidate	Votes	%
Democratic	John Garamendi (Incumbent)	134,875	58.1
Republican	Charlie Schaupp	97,376	41.9
Total votes		232,251	100.0
Democratic hold			

=== 2020 ===
2020 United States House of Representatives elections in California, District 3
Party	Candidate	Votes	%
Democratic	John Garamendi (incumbent)	176,036	54.7
Republican	Tamika Hamilton	145,941	45.3
Total votes		321,977	100.0
Democratic hold			

=== 2022 ===
2022 United States House of Representatives elections in California, District 3
Party	Candidate	Votes	%
Republican	Kevin Kiley	181,438	53.6
Democratic	Kermit Jones	156,761	46.4
Total votes		338,199	100.0
Republican win (new seat)			

=== 2024 ===
2024 United States House of Representatives election in California, District 3
Party	Candidate	Votes	%
Republican	Kevin Kiley (incumbent)	234,246	55.5
Democratic	Jessica Morse	188,067	44.5
Total votes		422,313	100.0
Republican hold			

== Historical district boundaries ==
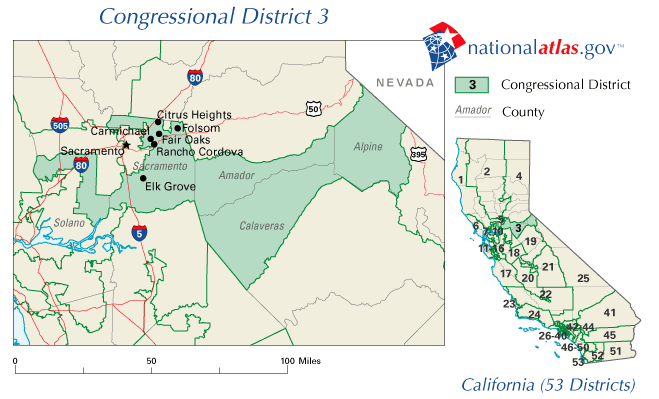
2003 - 2013

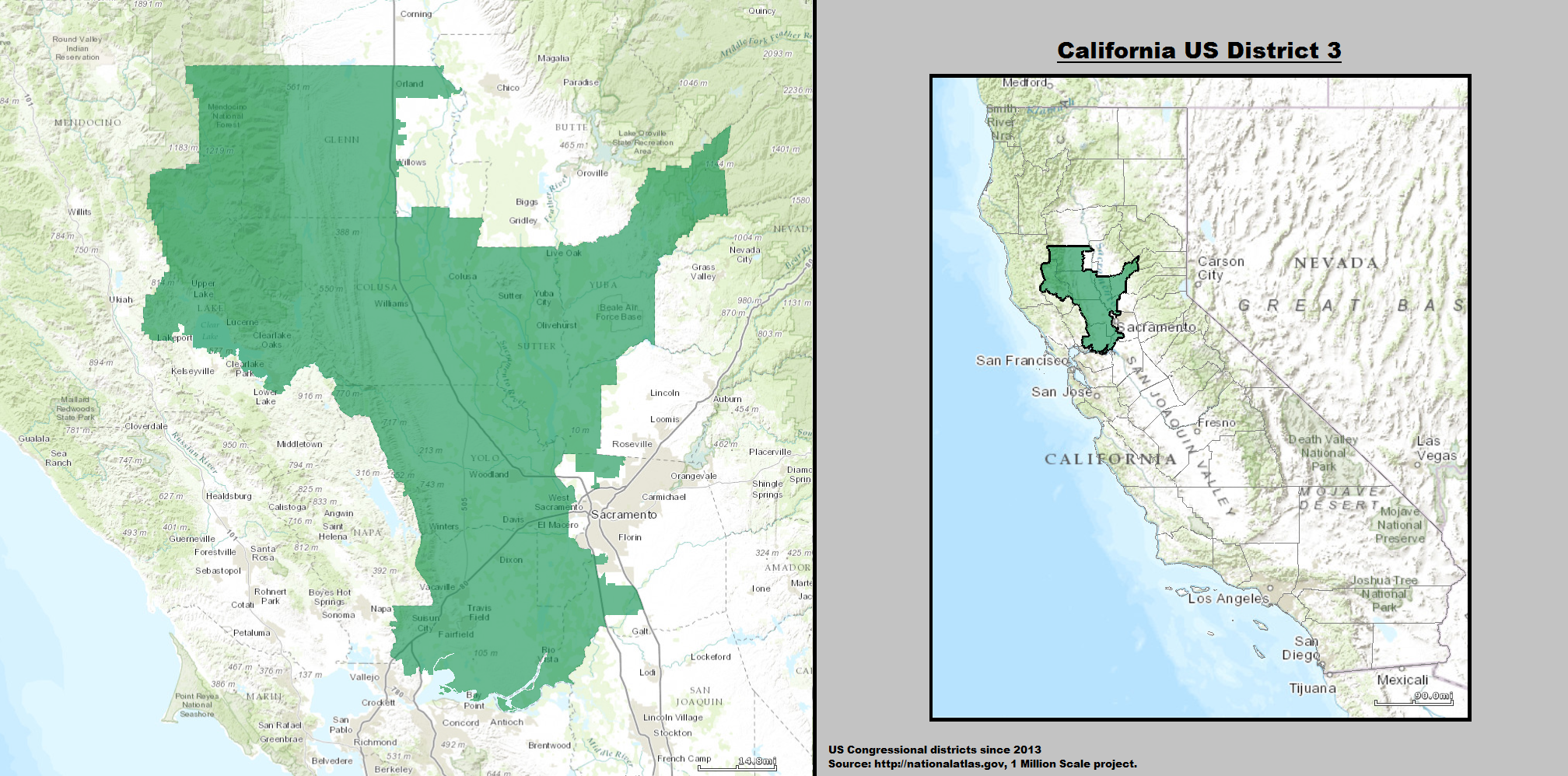
2013 - 2023

== See also ==
- List of United States congressional districts
- California's congressional districts
