= James McLachlan (American politician) =

American politician

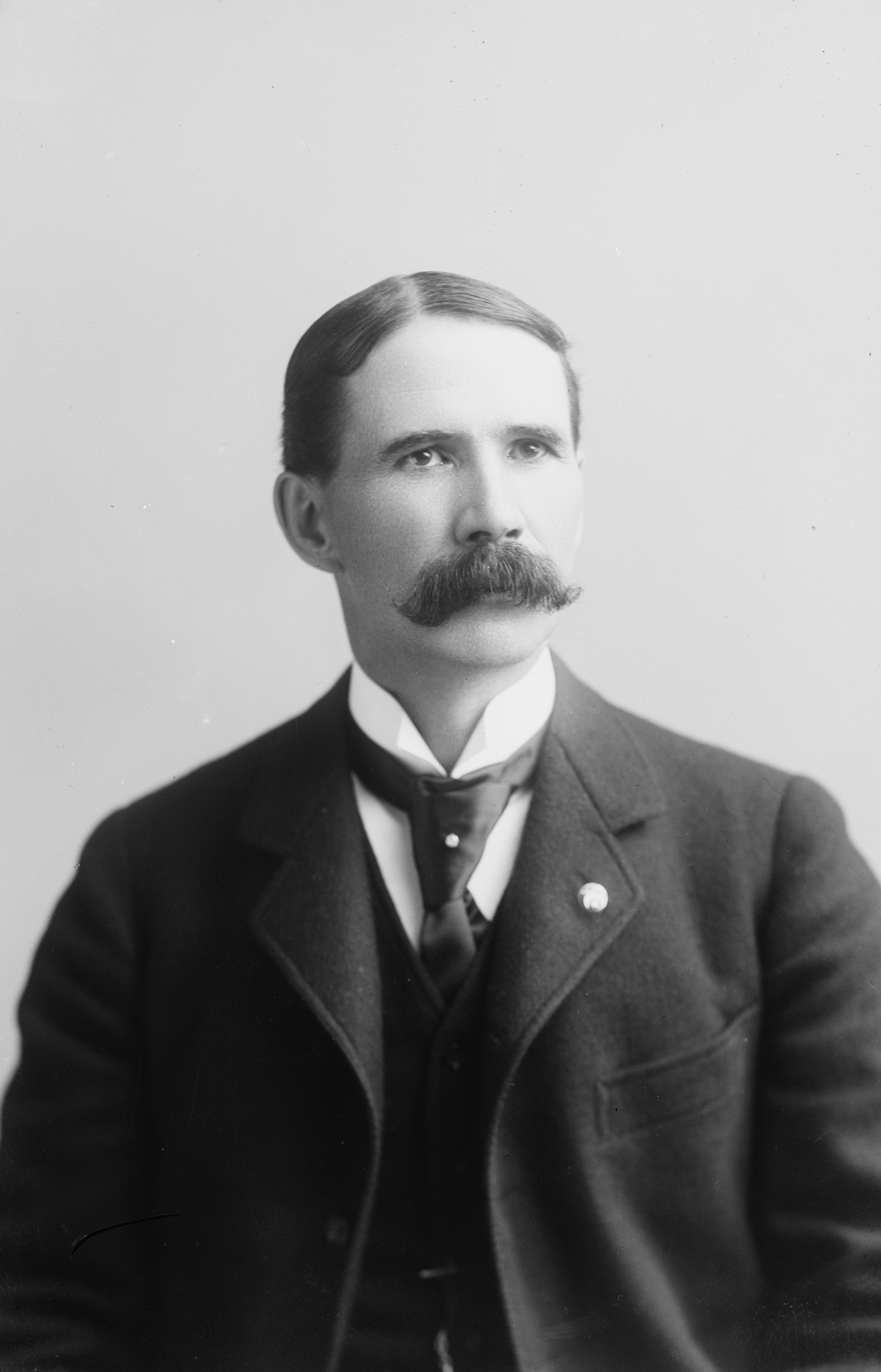
- Portrait by C. M. Bell c. 1895–1896

Member of the U.S. House of Representatives from California
- In office March 4, 1901 – March 3, 1911
- Preceded by: Russell J. Waters
- Succeeded by: William Stephens
- Constituency: 6th district (1901–1903); 7th district (1903–1911)
- In office March 4, 1895 – March 3, 1897
- Preceded by: Marion Cannon
- Succeeded by: Charles A. Barlow
- Constituency: 6th district

22nd Los Angeles County District Attorney
- In office 1890–1892
- Preceded by: Frank P. Kelly
- Succeeded by: Henry C. Dillon

Personal details
- Born: August 1, 1852 Argyllshire, Scotland
- Died: November 21, 1940 (aged 88) Los Angeles, California, U.S.
- Resting place: Forest Lawn Memorial Park; Glendale, California
- Party: Republican

James McLachlan (August 1, 1852 – November 21, 1940) was an American educator, lawyer and politician who served six terms as a U.S. representative from California.

== Early life ==
McLachlan was born in Argyllshire, Scotland, on August 1, 1852. He immigrated to the United States in 1855 with his parents, who settled in Tompkins County, New York. He was reared on a farm there.

== Education ==
He attended the public schools in Tompkins County. Eventually, he attended Hamilton College in Clinton, New York, graduating in 1878.

== Career ==
Even before McLachlan went to college, he was a teacher in the public schools he had attended. He was elected school commissioner of Tompkins County in 1877, while still earning his degree.

After his college graduation, McLachlan studied law. He was admitted to practice in New York State in 1880, and practiced law in Ithaca, New York from 1881 to 1888, when he moved to Pasadena, California

McLachlan continued his law practice in Pasadena. From 1890 to 1892, he served as Los Angeles County District Attorney.

=== Congress ===
On November 6, 1894, McLachlan was elected as a Republican to the Fifty-fourth Congress (March 4, 1895 – March 3, 1897), defeating Democrat George S. Patton (father of George S. Patton, Jr., the famous World War II general). In 1896, McLachlan was unsuccessful in his re-election bid, losing to Charles A. Barlow, a "fusion" candidate supported by both the Populist and Democratic parties.

McLachlan was elected to the Fifty-seventh through the Sixty-first Congresses (March 4, 1901 – March 3, 1911). He was defeated for renomination to Congress in 1910 by future governor William Stephens.

=== Later life and death ===
McLachlan resumed the practice of law in Los Angeles and served as a member of the National Monetary Commission in 1911–1912. He died in Los Angeles on November 21, 1940 at the age of 88, and was interred at Forest Lawn Memorial-Park in Glendale, California.

== Electoral history ==
1894 United States House of Representatives elections
Party	Candidate	Votes	%
Republican	James McLachlan	18,746	44.3
Democratic	George S. Patton	11,693	27.6
Populist	W. C. Bowman	9,769	23.1
Prohibition	J. E. McComas	2,120	5.0
Total votes		42,328	100.0
Republican gain from Populist			

1896 United States House of Representatives elections
Party	Candidate	Votes	%
Populist	Charles A. Barlow	24,157	48.9
Republican	James McLachlan (Incumbent)	23,494	47.6
Prohibition	Henry Clay Needham	1,196	2.4
Socialist Labor	Job Harriman	542	1.1
Total votes		49,389	100.0
Populist gain from Republican			

1900 United States House of Representatives elections
Party	Candidate	Votes	%
Republican	James McLachlan	27,081	51.8
Democratic	William Graves	19,793	37.9
Socialist	H. G. Wilshire	3,674	7.0
Prohibition	James Campbell	1,693	3.2
Total votes		52,241	100.0
Republican hold			

United States House of Representatives elections, 1902
Party	Candidate	Votes	%
Republican	James McLachlan (inc.)	19,407	64.8
Democratic	Carl A. Johnson	8,075	27.0
Socialist	George H. Hewes	1,261	4.2
Prohibition	Frederick F. Wheeler	1,195	4.0
Total votes		30,638	100.0
Turnout			
Republican hold			

United States House of Representatives elections, 1904
Party	Candidate	Votes	%
Republican	James McLachlan (inc.)	31,091	64.2
Democratic	W. O. Morton	11,259	23.3
Socialist	F. I. Wheat	3,594	7.4
Prohibition	John Sobieski	2,467	5.1
Total votes		48,411	100.0
Turnout			
Republican hold			

United States House of Representatives elections, 1906
Party	Candidate	Votes	%
Republican	James McLachlan (inc.)	22,338	56.8
Democratic	Robert G. Laucks	11,197	28.4
Socialist	Claude Riddle	3,641	9.2
Prohibition	Levi D. Johnson	2,189	5.6
Total votes		39,365	100.0
Turnout			
Republican hold			

United States House of Representatives elections, 1908
Party	Candidate	Votes	%
Republican	James McLachlan (inc.)	37,244	51.9
Democratic	Jud R. Rush	25,445	35.4
Socialist	A. R. Holston	4,432	6.2
Prohibition	Marshall W. Atwood	3,899	5.4
Independence	F. G. Hentig	791	1.1
Total votes		71,811	100.0
Turnout			
Republican hold			

United States House of Representatives elections, 1910
Party	Candidate	Votes	%
Republican	William Stephens (incumbent)	36,435	58.7
Democratic	Lorin A. Handley	13,340	21.5
Socialist	Thomas V. Williams	10,305	16.6
Prohibition	C. V. LeFontaine	1,990	3.2
Total votes		62,070	100.0
Turnout			
Republican hold			

== See also ==
- 1894 United States House of Representatives elections in California

== Additional sources ==
- United States Congress. "James McLachlan (id: M000532)". Biographical Directory of the United States Congress.

U.S. House of Representatives
Preceded by Marion Cannon	Member of the U.S. House of Representatives from California's 6th congressional district 1895–1897	Succeeded by Charles A. Barlow
Preceded by Russell J. Waters	Member of the U.S. House of Representatives from California's 6th congressional district 1901–1903	Succeeded by James C. Needham
Preceded by James C. Needham	Member of the U.S. House of Representatives from California's 7th congressional district 1903–1911	Succeeded by William D. Stephens
