= William Vandever =

Union Army general

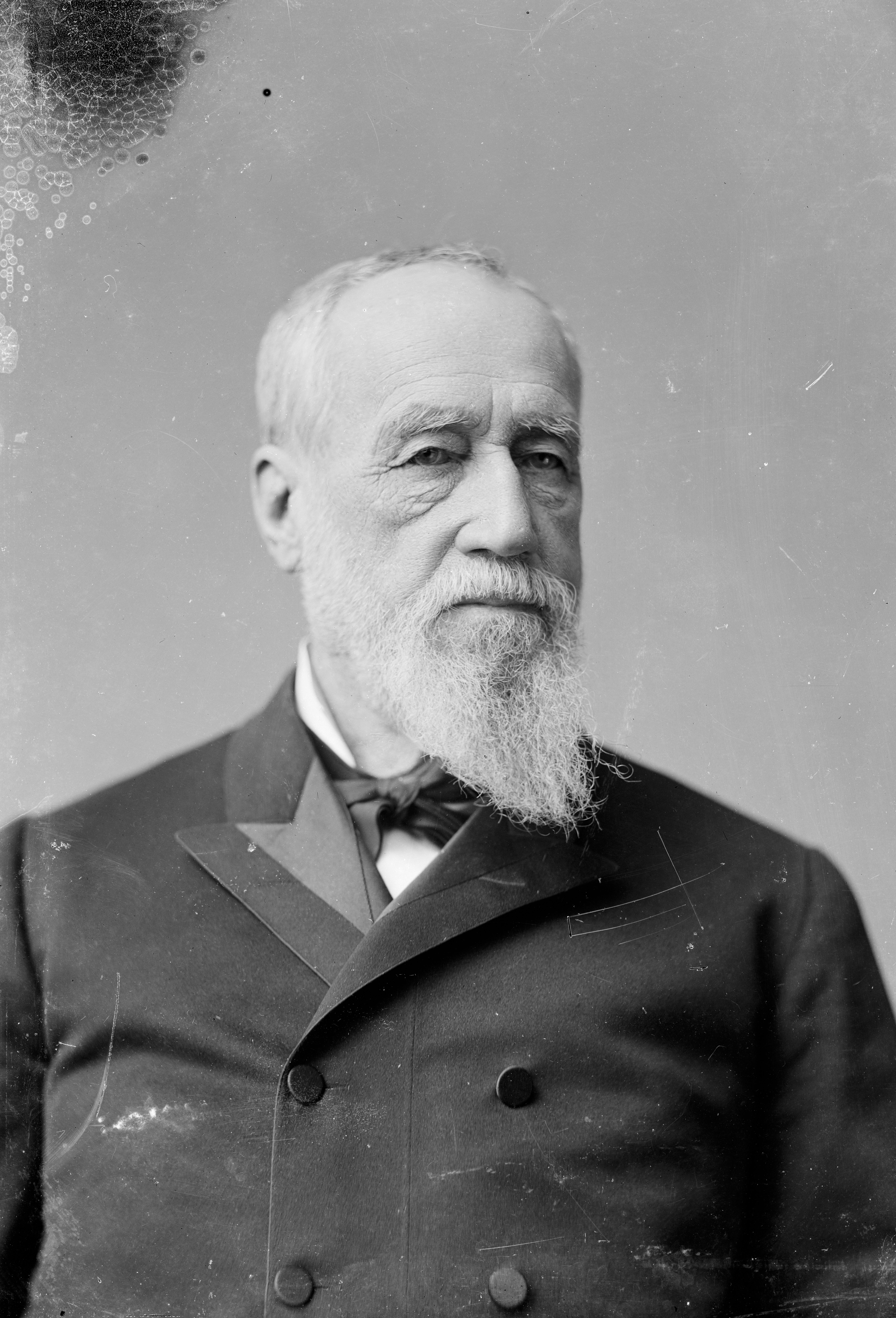
- Portrait by C. M. Bell c. 1887–1891

Member of the U.S. House of Representatives from California's 6th district
- In office March 4, 1887 – March 3, 1891
- Preceded by: Henry Markham
- Succeeded by: William W. Bowers

Member of the U.S. House of Representatives from Iowa's 2nd district
- In office March 4, 1859 – March 3, 1863
- Preceded by: Timothy Davis
- Succeeded by: Hiram Price

Personal details
- Born: March 31, 1817 Baltimore, Maryland, U.S.
- Died: July 24, 1893 (aged 76) Ventura, California, U.S.
- Resting place: Ventura Cemetery, Ventura, California

Military service
- Allegiance: United States
- Branch/service: United States Army
- Years of service: 1861–1865
- Rank: Brevet Major General
- Battles/wars: American Civil War; Battle of Pea Ridge; Battle of Arkansas Post; Battle of Chalk Bluff; Siege of Vicksburg; Yazoo City Expedition; Red River Campaign; Atlanta Campaign; Battle of Bentonville

William Vandever (March 31, 1817 – July 23, 1893) was a United States representative from Iowa and later from California, and a general in the Union Army during the American Civil War.

== Biography ==
=== Early life ===
Vandever was born in Baltimore, Maryland, where he attended the common schools and pursued an academic course. He moved to Illinois in 1839 and to Iowa in 1851. He studied law and was admitted to the bar in 1852 and commenced practice in Dubuque, Iowa. He was of Swedish and Dutch descent.

=== Congress ===
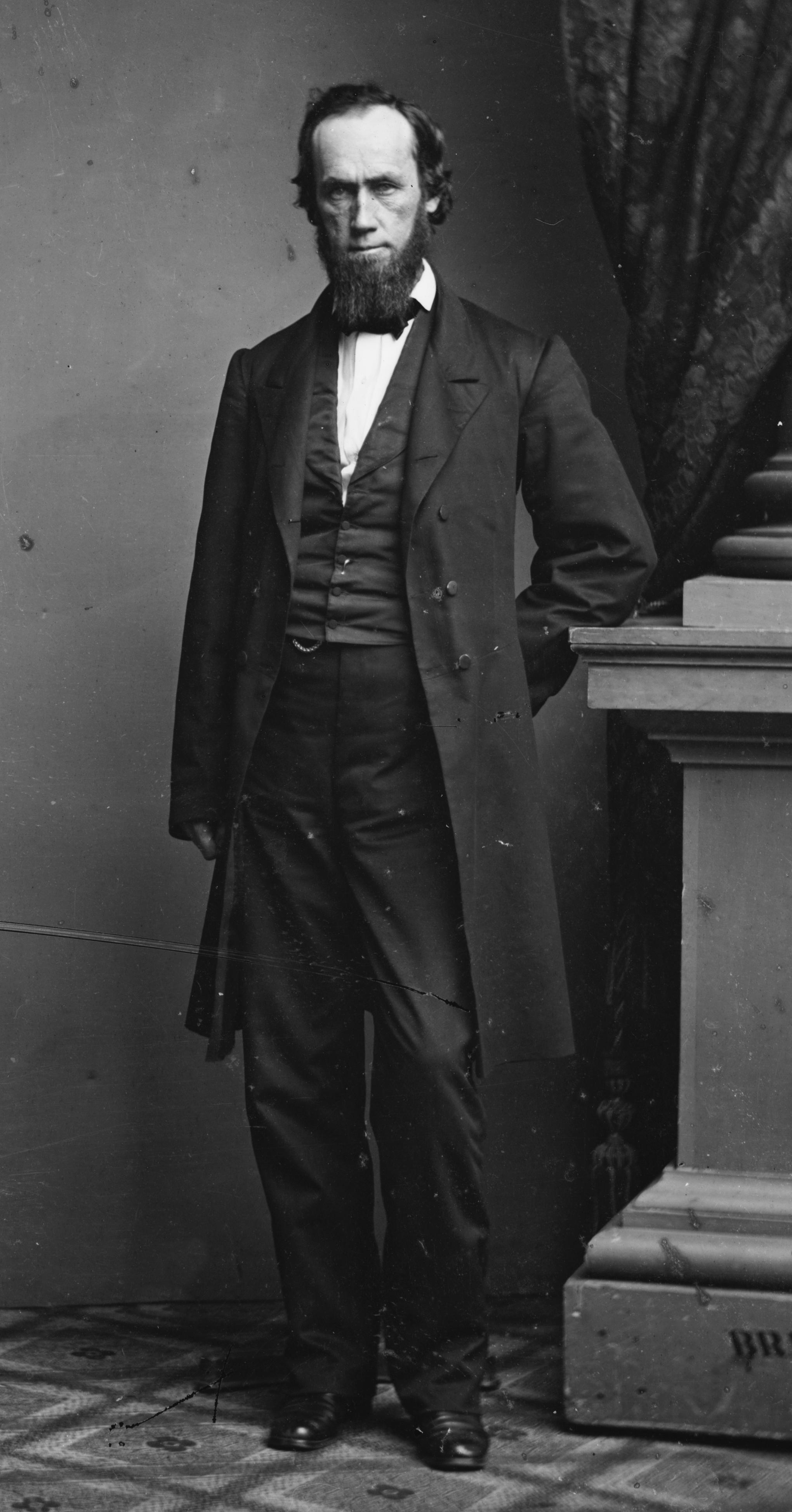
Portrait by Brady c. 1859–1863

In 1858 he was elected as a Republican to represent Iowa's 2nd congressional district in the Thirty-sixth Congress, and was re-elected in 1860 to represent it in the Thirty-seventh Congress. He was a member of the peace conference of 1861 held in Washington, D.C., in an effort to devise means to prevent the impending war.

=== Civil War ===
Carte de visite of Francis J. Herron (left), Vandever (center) and a third officer, possibly William H. Coyle, c. 1862–1865

In 1861, Vandever was mustered into the Union Army as colonel of the 9th Iowa Volunteer Infantry Regiment. He commanded the 2nd Brigade in Eugene A. Carr's 4th Division at the battle of Pea Ridge. He was promoted to brigadier general of Volunteers on November 29, 1862, and sent to command a brigade in the XIII Corps of the Army of the Tennessee. He returned to the Trans-Mississippi Theater to command the 2nd Division in the Army of the Frontier at the Battle of Chalk Bluff. He reverted to brigade command under Francis J. Herron during the siege of Vicksburg. He returned to Iowa as a recruiting officer in January 1864. He joined up with William T. Sherman's army in command of the 3rd Brigade, 2nd Division, XVI Corps and fought at the battles of Kennesaw Mountain, Atlanta and Ezra Church. He commanded the Post of Marietta during the fall of 1864 then rejoined Sherman's army in command of the 1st Brigade, 2nd Division, XIV Corps and fought at the battle of Bentonville. He was brevetted to major general in 1865. After the war, he was elected as a companion of the Military Order of the Loyal Legion of the United States.

=== Congressional vacancy ===
Although his official congressional biography states that Vandever only served in Congress until September 24, 1861 (early in his second term), he never resigned his seat. Iowa's only other congressional seat (in the First District) was vacant from August 4 to October 8, 1861, because Representative Samuel Curtis had resigned his seat after receiving command of the 2nd Iowa Infantry, so for a time Iowa was effectively unrepresented in the U.S. House. In May 1862, Democratic Congressman George H. Browne of Rhode Island raised a challenge to the constitutionality of Vandever holding a military commission and commanding a regiment while remaining a member of Congress, but consideration by the House on that issue was deferred until December 1862. On March 4, 1863, the day after Vandever's second House term ended, his appointment as a brigadier general was confirmed by the Senate.

He resumed the practice of law in Dubuque and was appointed United States Indian inspector by President Ulysses S. Grant in 1873, and served until 1877.

=== Tenure in Congress ===
Vandever moved to San Buenaventura, California in 1884. He was elected as a Republican to represent California's 6th congressional district in the House in the Fiftieth and Fifty-first Congresses (March 4, 1887 – March 3, 1891). At the time, the Sixth District included more than half of the area of the state, extending from San Diego County to Mono County. He was not a candidate for renomination in 1890.

=== Death ===
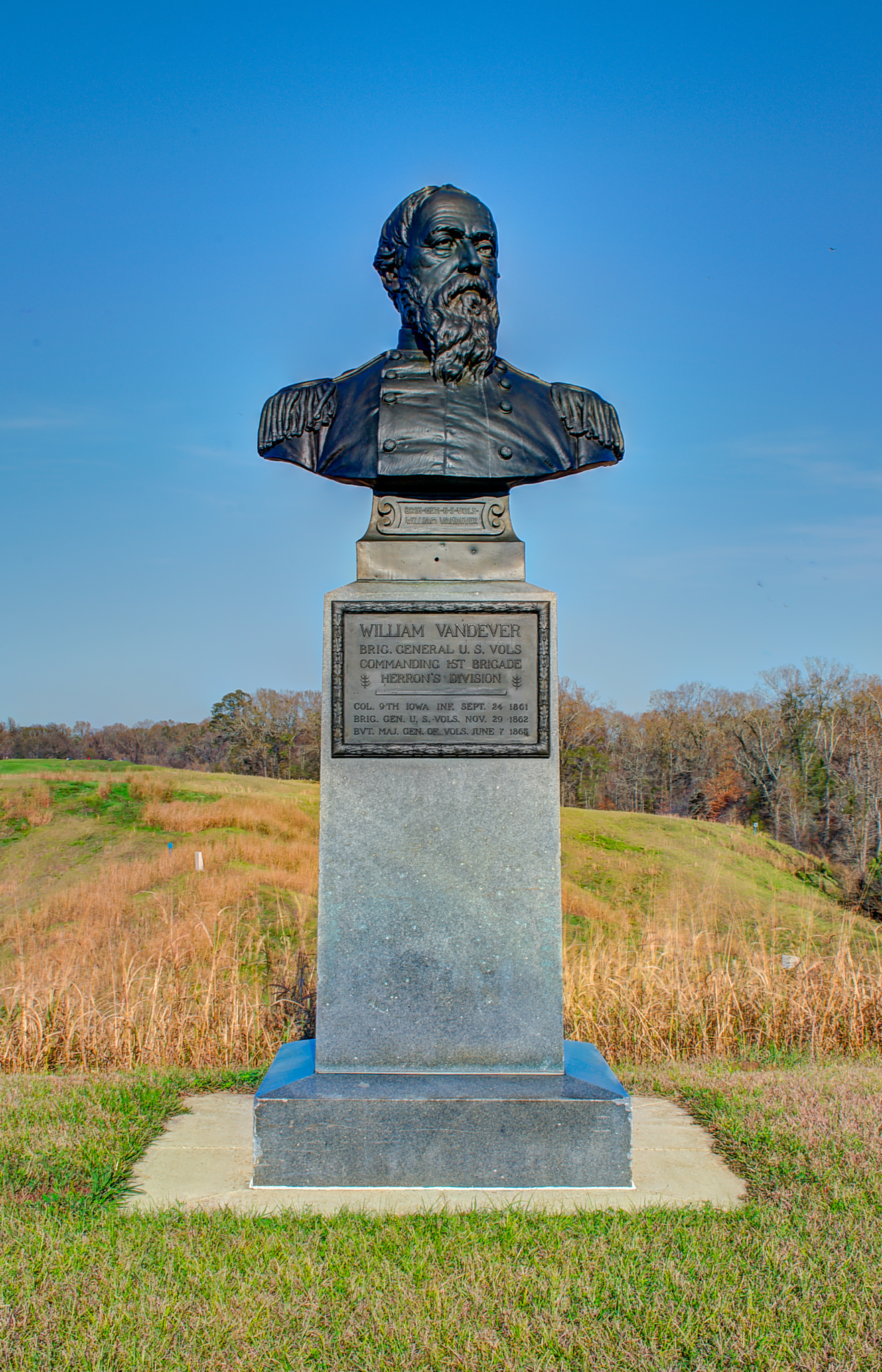
Bust of Vandever by George Brewster at Vicksburg National Military Park

He died in Ventura, California, in 1893 and was buried in Ventura Cemetery.

== Electoral history ==
1886 United States House of Representatives elections
Party	Candidate	Votes	%
Republican	William Vandever	18,259	47.3
Democratic	Joseph D. Lynch	18,204	47.1
Prohibition	W. A. Harris	2,159	5.6
Total votes		38,622	100.0
Republican hold			

1888 United States House of Representatives elections
Party	Candidate	Votes	%
Republican	William Vandever (Incumbent)	35,406	52.5
Democratic	Reel B. Terry	29,453	43.7
Prohibition	J. G. Miller	2,375	3.5
Know Nothing	Alfred Daggett	150	0.2
Total votes		67,384	100.0
Republican hold			

== See also ==
- List of American Civil War generals (Union)
- Vandever Mountain

U.S. House of Representatives
Preceded by Timothy Davis	Member of the U.S. House of Representatives from Iowa's 2nd congressional district March 4, 1859 – March 3, 1863	Succeeded by Hiram Price
Preceded by Henry H. Markham	Member of the U.S. House of Representatives from California's 6th congressional district March 4, 1887 – March 3, 1891	Succeeded by William W. Bowers
