= William W. Bowers =

American politician (1834–1917)

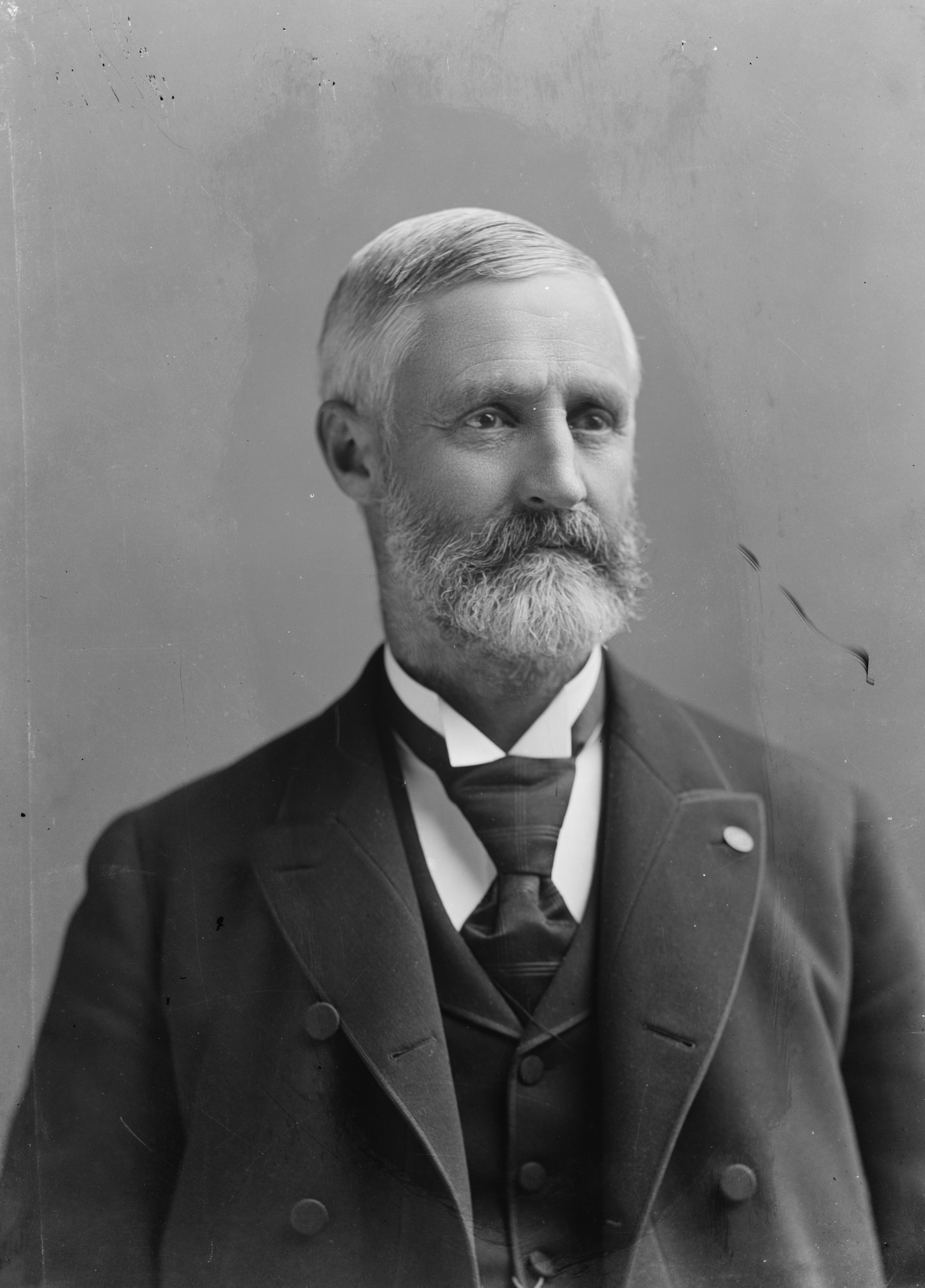
- Portrait by C. M. Bell, c. 1891–1894

Member of the U.S. House of Representatives from California
- In office March 4, 1891 – March 3, 1897
- Preceded by: William Vandever
- Succeeded by: Curtis H. Castle
- Constituency: 6th district (1891–1893); 7th district (1893–1897)

Member of the California Senate from the 40th district
- In office January 3, 1887 – January 5, 1891
- Preceded by: District created

Member of the California State Assembly from the 1st district
- In office December 1, 1873 – December 6, 1875
- Preceded by: Multi-member district
- Succeeded by: Multi-member district

Personal details
- Born: October 20, 1834 Whitestown, New York, U.S.
- Died: May 2, 1917 (aged 82) San Diego, California, U.S.
- Party: Republican

William Wallace Bowers (October 20, 1834 – May 2, 1917) was an American Civil War veteran and politician who served three terms as a U.S. representative from California from 1891 to 1897.

== Biography ==
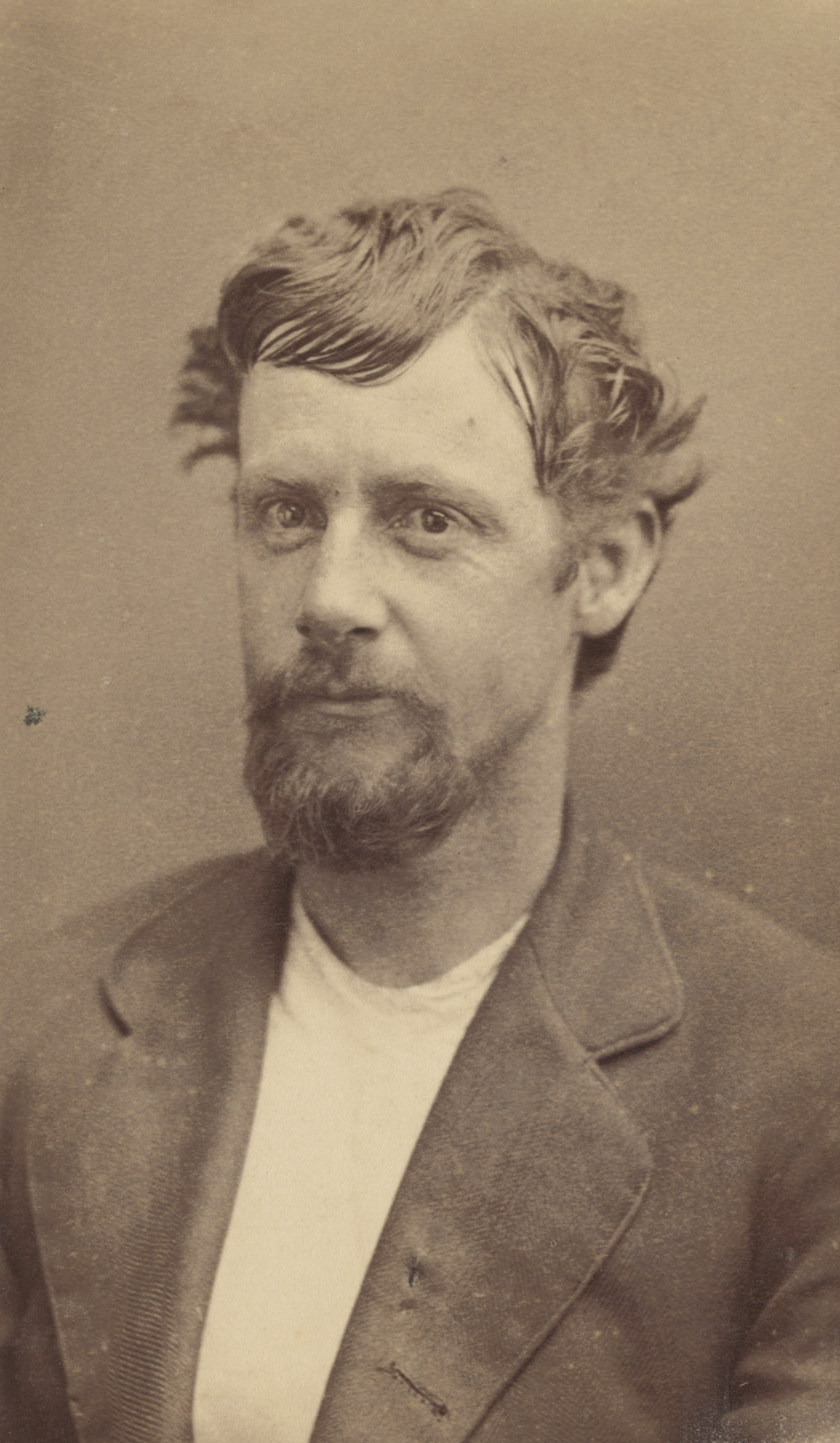
Bowers c. 1865

Born in Whitestown, New York, Bowers attended the common schools. He moved to Wisconsin in 1854.

During the American Civil War, he enlisted as a private in Company I, First Wisconsin Cavalry, on February 22, 1862. He was discharged from the service as second sergeant February 22, 1865.

He moved to San Diego, California, in 1869 where he engaged in ranching and served as a member of the California State Assembly in 1873 and 1874. He was appointed collector of customs of the port of San Diego, California, September 25, 1874, and served until his resignation on February 3, 1879. He owned and operated a hotel in San Diego from 1884 to 1891, and served as member of the California State Senate from 1887 to 1889.

=== Congress ===
Bowers was elected as a Republican to the Fifty-second, Fifty-third, and Fifty-fourth Congresses (March 4, 1891 – March 3, 1897). He served as chairman of the Committee on Revision of the Laws (Fifty-fourth Congress). He was an unsuccessful candidate for reelection in 1896 to the Fifty-fifth Congress. In 1889, Senator W. W. Bowers included hemp in a comprehensive anti-narcotics bill

=== After Congress ===
He was again appointed collector of customs of the port of San Diego, California, on March 15, 1902, and served until March 4, 1906.

=== Death ===
Bowers resided in San Diego in retirement until his death there on May 2, 1917. He was interred in the Masonic Cemetery.

== Electoral history ==
1890 United States House of Representatives elections
Party	Candidate	Votes	%
Republican	William W. Bowers	33,522	51.1
Democratic	W. J. Curtis	28,904	44.1
Prohibition	O. R. Dougherty	3,130	4.8
Total votes		65,556	100.0
Republican hold			

United States House of Representatives elections, 1892
Party	Candidate	Votes	%
Republican	William W. Bowers (inc.)	15,856	41.6
Democratic	Olin Welborn	14,869	39.0
Populist	Hiram Hamilton	5,578	14.6
Prohibition	M. B. Harris	1,844	4.8
Total votes		38,147	100.0
Turnout			
Republican hold			

United States House of Representatives elections, 1894
Party	Candidate	Votes	%
Republican	William W. Bowers (inc.)	18,434	42.9
Democratic	William H. Alford	12,111	28.2
Populist	J. L. Gilbert	10,719	25.0
Prohibition	W. H. Somers	1,669	3.9
Total votes		42,933	100.0
Turnout			
Republican hold			

United States House of Representatives elections, 1896
Party	Candidate	Votes	%
Populist	Curtis H. Castle	19,183	46.7
Republican	William W. Bowers (inc.)	18,939	46.1
Independent	William H. "Billy" Carlson	2,139	5.2
Prohibition	James W. Webb	802	2.0
Total votes		41,063	100.0
Turnout			
Populist gain from Republican			

== Sources ==
- United States Congress. "William W. Bowers (id: B000692)". Biographical Directory of the United States Congress.

U.S. House of Representatives
Preceded by William Vandever	Member of the U.S. House of Representatives from California's 6th congressional district 1891–1893	Succeeded by Marion Cannon
New district	Member of the U.S. House of Representatives from California's 7th congressional district 1893–1897	Succeeded by Curtis H. Castle
