= Charles A. Barlow =

American businessman and politician

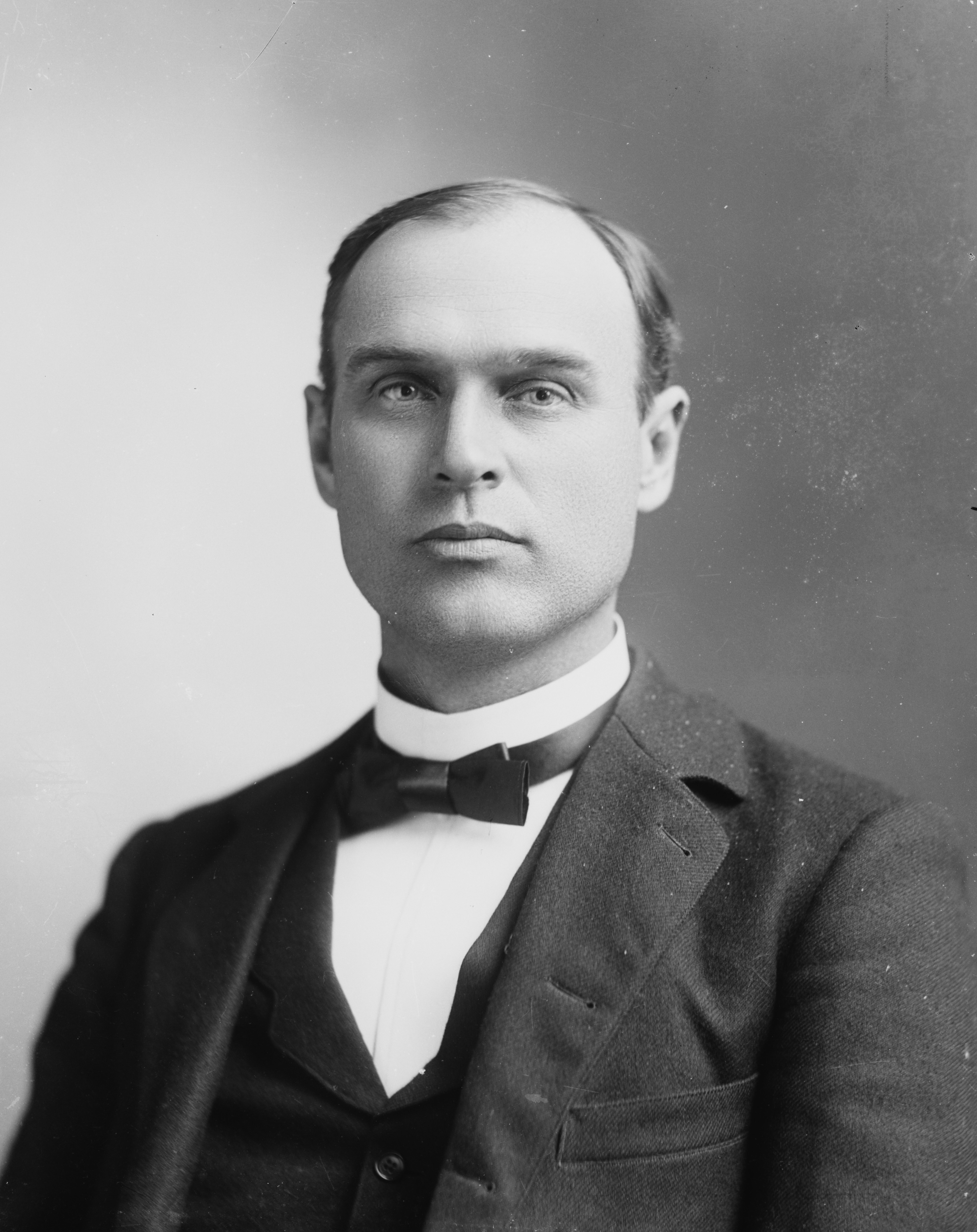
- Portrait by C. M. Bell, c. 1897–1898

Member of the U.S. House of Representatives from California's 6th district
- In office March 4, 1897 – March 3, 1899
- Preceded by: James McLachlan
- Succeeded by: Russell J. Waters

Member of the California State Assembly from the 67th district
- In office January 2, 1893 - January 7, 1895
- Preceded by: Frank H. Gould
- Succeeded by: J. H. Glass

Personal details
- Born: Charles Averill Barlow; March 17, 1858 Cleveland, Ohio, US
- Died: October 3, 1927 (aged 69) Bakersfield, California, US
- Resting place: Union Cemetery in Bakersfield, California
- Party: Populist
- Other political affiliations: Democratic
- Spouse(s): Elizabeth "Lizzie" McDonnell; Julia Lillis Caldwell
- Children: 1
- Occupation: Businessman, politician

Charles Averill Barlow (March 17, 1858 – October 3, 1927) was an American farmer, businessman and politician. He was most notable for his service as a member of the California State Assembly and as a U.S. Representative from California's 6th congressional district for one term from 1897 to 1899.

== Early life ==
Barlow was born in Cleveland, Ohio on March 17, 1858, the son of Merrill Barlow and Ann Frances (Arnold) Barlow. The Barlow family, including Barlow's three brothers and sisters, moved to Ventura, California in 1875. Barlow was educated in the public schools of Cleveland and Ventura, and after completing his education he supported himself by working as a harness maker and farm laborer.

== Career ==
Barlow became a businessman. He purchased an interest in his employer's harness making business, and then invested in other ventures, including a business drying and shipping fruit grown in California.

He moved to San Luis Obispo in the early 1880s, where he grew wheat and with a partner began a weekly newspaper, the Reasoner. He became interested in reform causes including the Free Silver movement that led him to join the Populist Party, and the Reasoner became a major pro-Populist outlet.

=== State assembly ===
Barlow was elected to the California State Assembly as a Populist, and served one term, 1892 to 1893. He served as chairman of the Populist Party state convention in 1896.

=== Congress ===
Later that year, Barlow was elected to the 55th Congress primarily as a Populist, but also received the Democratic nomination, and served one term, March 4, 1897 – March 3, 1899. He did not seek another term in 1898.

=== Later career ===
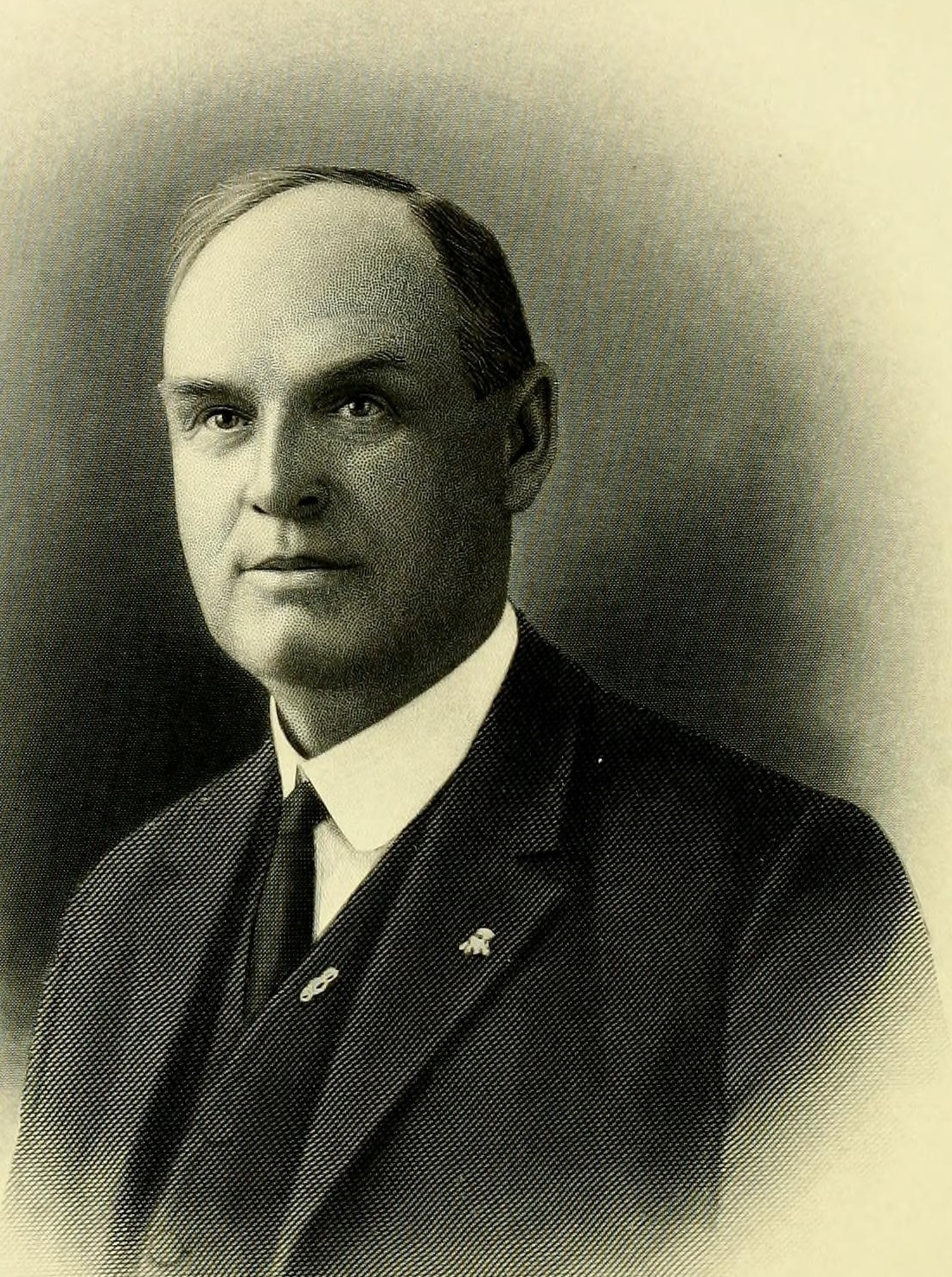
From 1914's History of Kern County, California by Wallace M. Morgan

After leaving Congress, Barlow turned his attention to business and moved to Bakersfield. He was one of the major shareholders in, and a member of the board of directors of, Bakersfield's Security Trust Company. He was also a partner in Barlow & Hill, a company that dealt in land for oil exploration, and helped found several oil companies, some of which Barlow & Hill continued to operate, and some of which were sold to other investors.

Barlow served as president of the Kern County Board of Trade and was active in several civic organizations, including Modern Woodmen, Elks, and Odd Fellows. He joined the Democratic Party after the end of the Populist movement, and served as a delegate to the 1912 and 1920 Democratic National Conventions.

== Personal life ==
Barlow was first married to Elizabeth "Lizzie" McDonnell (1867–1914) of Ventura.

After the death of Barlow's first wife, he married Julia Lillis Caldwell (1878–1971) of Santa Rosa, who had been Lizzie Barlow's nurse. They adopted a daughter, Mamie.

== Death and burial ==
On October 3, 1927, Barlow died in Bakersfield. He was interred at Bakersfield's Union Cemetery.

== Electoral history ==
1896 United States House of Representatives elections
Party	Candidate	Votes	%
Populist	Charles A. Barlow	24,157	48.9
Republican	James McLachlan (Incumbent)	23,494	47.6
Prohibition	Henry Clay Needham	1,196	2.4
Socialist Labor	Job Harriman	542	1.1
Total votes		49,389	100.0
Populist gain from Republican			

1898 United States House of Representatives elections
Party	Candidate	Votes	%
Republican	Russell J. Waters	24,050	52.6
Populist	Charles A. Barlow (Incumbent)	20,499	44.9
Socialist Labor	James T. Van Ransselaer	1,132	2.5
Total votes		45,681	100.0
Republican gain from Populist			

== Additional sources ==
=== Books ===
- Morgan, Wallace M. (1914). History of Kern County, California. Los Angeles, CA: Historic Record Company.
- U.S. Congress, Joint Committee on Printing (1897). Official Congressional Directory. Washington, DC: US Government Printing Office.

=== Newspapers ===
- "Death Ends Active Life: Charles A. Barlow Dies at Bakersfield". Los Angeles Times. Los Angeles, CA. October 4, 1927 – via Newspapers.com.
- Gavin, Camille (March 24, 2008). "This old house: Celebrate the coming centennial of a stately Bakersfield home". The Bakersfield Californian. Bakersfield, CA.
- Hamilton, Edward H. (July 8, 1920). "Californians Go Down With McAdoo". location=San Francisco, CA – via Newspapers.com.

U.S. House of Representatives
Preceded by James McLachlan	Member of the U.S. House of Representatives from California's 6th congressional district 1897–1899	Succeeded by Russell J. Waters
