= James C. Needham =

American politician

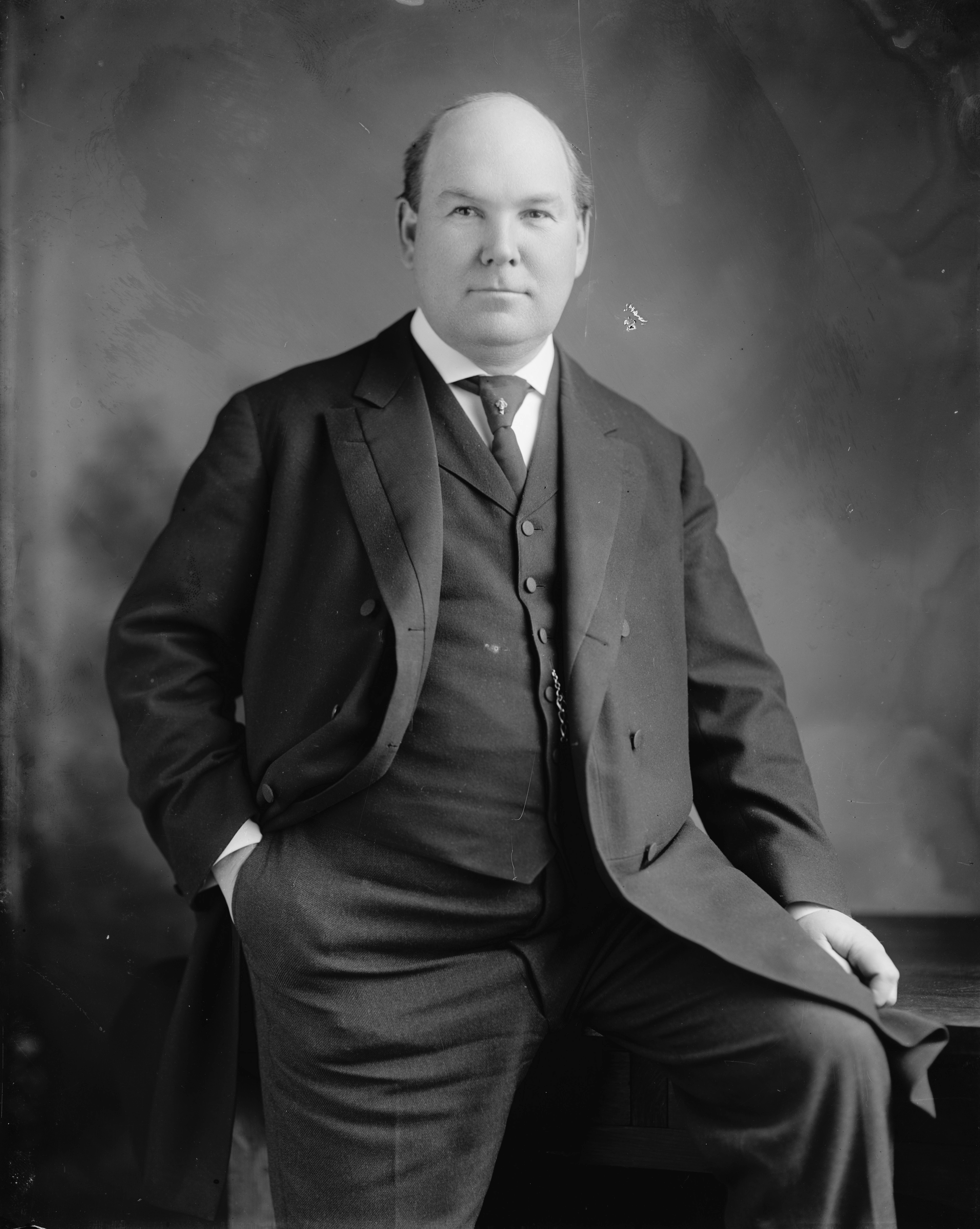

Member of the U.S. House of Representatives from California's 6th district
- In office March 4, 1899 – March 3, 1913
- Preceded by: Curtis H. Castle
- Succeeded by: Joseph R. Knowland
- Constituency: 7th district (1899–1903); 6th district (1903–1913)

Personal details
- Born: James Carson Needham; September 17, 1864 Carson City, Nevada
- Died: July 11, 1942 (aged 77) Modesto, California
- Resting place: Masonic Cemetery
- Party: Republican
- Education: California Wesleyan College; University of Michigan Law School

James Carson Needham (September 17, 1864 – July 11, 1942) was an American lawyer and politician who served as a seven-term U.S. Representative from California from 1899 to 1913.

== Biography ==
Born in a covered wagon at Carson City, Nevada, James Needham arrived as a baby with his parents Charles and Olive at Mayfield, Santa Clara, California, October 1, 1864. He attended the Santa Clara County public schools. He was graduated from the California Wesleyan College at San Jose in 1886 and from the law department of the University of Michigan at Ann Arbor in 1889. He served as clerk in The Adjutant General's Office of the War Department in Washington, D.C., from September 1, 1887, until September 1, 1888, when he resigned to complete his law course. He was admitted to the bar in 1889 and commenced practice in Modesto, California. He was an unsuccessful candidate for election to the State senate in 1890.

=== Congress ===
Portrait by C. M. Bell c. 1899–1901

Needham was elected as a Republican to the Fifty-sixth and to the six succeeding Congresses (March 4, 1899 – March 3, 1913). He was an unsuccessful candidate in 1912 for reelection to the Sixty-third Congress.

=== Later career ===
Needham resumed the practice of law in San Diego, California from 1913 to 1916, when he returned to Modesto, California, and continued his profession.

Needham was appointed a judge of the Stanislaus County Superior Court January 1, 1919. He was elected to the same office in 1920 to fill an unexpired term. He was reelected in 1922 and again in 1926, and served until January 1, 1935.

=== Death ===
He died in Modesto, California on July 11, 1942. He was interred in the Masonic Cemetery.

== Electoral history ==
United States House of Representatives elections, 1898
Party	Candidate	Votes	%
Republican	James C. Needham	20,793	50.1
Populist	Curtis H. Castle (incumbent)	20,680	49.9
Total votes		41,473	100.0
Turnout			
Republican gain from Populist			

United States House of Representatives elections, 1900
Party	Candidate	Votes	%
Republican	James C. Needham (inc.)	23,450	52.4
Democratic	W. D. Crichton	18,981	42.4
Socialist	Noble A. Richardson	1,385	3.1
Prohibition	A. H. Hensley	919	2.1
Total votes		44,735	100.0
Turnout			
Republican hold			

1902 United States House of Representatives elections
Party	Candidate	Votes	%
Republican	James C. Needham (Incumbent)	17,268	53.5
Democratic	Gaston M. Ashe	13,732	42.5
Socialist	J. L. Cobb	815	2.5
Prohibition	Joel H. Smith	466	1.4
Total votes		32,281	100.0
Republican hold			

1904 United States House of Representatives elections
Party	Candidate	Votes	%
Republican	James C. Needham (Incumbent)	18,828	55.1
Democratic	William M. Conley	13,074	38.2
Socialist	J. L. Cobb	1,537	4.5
Prohibition	Joel H. Smith	740	2.2
Total votes		34,079	100.0
Republican hold			

=== 1906 ===
1906 United States House of Representatives elections
Party	Candidate	Votes	%
Republican	James C. Needham (Incumbent)	18,928	55.6
Democratic	Harry A. Greene	12,868	37.8
Socialist	Richard Kirk	1,303	3.8
Prohibition	Herman E. Burbank	964	2.8
Total votes		34,063	100.0
Republican hold			

=== 1908 ===
1908 United States House of Representatives elections
Party	Candidate	Votes	%
Republican	James C. Needham (Incumbent)	21,323	52.0
Democratic	Fred P. Feliz	15,868	38.7
Socialist	W. M. Pattison	2,288	5.6
Prohibition	James W. Webb	1,509	3.7
Total votes		40,988	100.0
Republican hold			

=== 1910 ===
1910 United States House of Representatives elections
Party	Candidate	Votes	%
Republican	James C. Needham (Incumbent)	19,717	47.3
Democratic	A. L. Cowell	18,408	44.2
Socialist	Richard Kirk	2,568	6.2
Prohibition	Ira E. Surface	951	2.3
Total votes		41,644	100.0
Republican hold			

U.S. House of Representatives
Preceded by Curtis H. Castle	Member of the U.S. House of Representatives from California's 7th congressional district 1899–1903	Succeeded by James McLachlan
Preceded by James McLachlan	Member of the U.S. House of Representatives from California's 6th congressional district 1903–1913	Succeeded by Joseph R. Knowland
