= Curtis H. Castle =

American politician

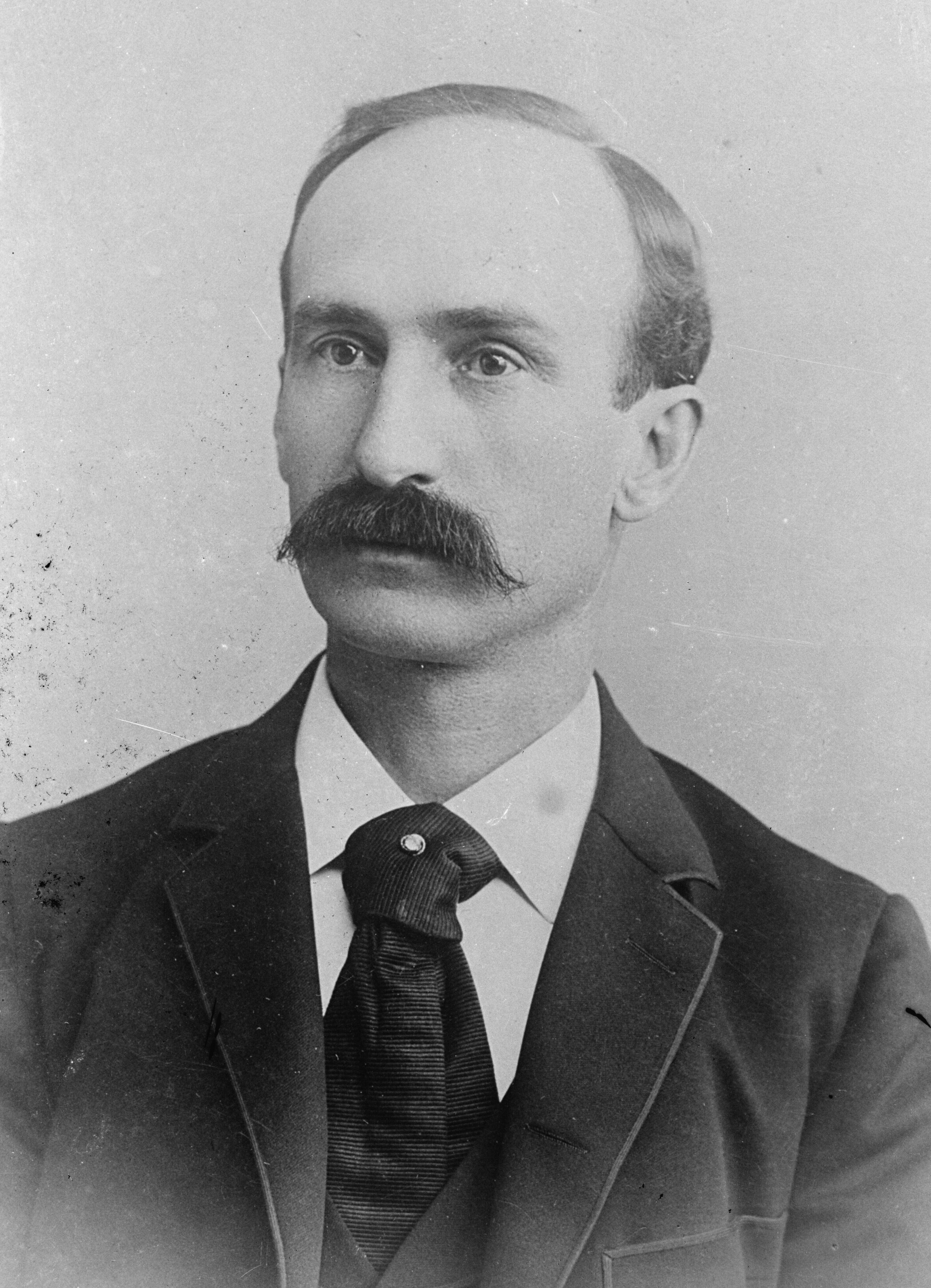
- Portrait by C. M. Bell, c. 1896

Member of the U.S. House of Representatives from California's 7th district
- In office March 4, 1897 – March 3, 1899
- Preceded by: William W. Bowers
- Succeeded by: James C. Needham

Personal details
- Born: Curtis Harvey Castle; October 4, 1848 Galesburg, Illinois, U.S.
- Died: July 12, 1928 (aged 79) Santa Barbara, California, U.S.
- Resting place: Santa Barbara Cemetery, California, U.S.
- Party: Populist

Curtis Harvey Castle (October 4, 1848 – July 12, 1928) was an American educator, physician and politician who served one term as a U.S. Representative from California from 1897 to 1899.

== Biography ==
Castle was born near Galesburg, Illinois on October 4, 1848, and attended the public schools and Knox College. In 1872, he graduated from Northwestern University in Evanston, Illinois with a Bachelor of Arts degree, and Northwestern later awarded him a Master of Arts degree.

=== Early career ===
After graduating from college, Castle served as principal of the Washington, Texas public schools from 1872 to 1876. In 1878, he graduated from the College of Physicians and Surgeons in Keokuk, Iowa. After becoming a doctor, he practiced in Fulton County, Illinois and Wayland, Iowa until 1882.

Castle moved to Point Arena, California in 1882, and to Merced County in 1888, where he continued the practice of medicine. After moving to California, he was a member of the American Academy of Medicine and several local and county medical societies. Having previously been a Republican, in the 1890s he became active in politics as a Populist. He served as chairman of the party in Merced County, and a member of its California state executive committee.

=== Congress ===
In 1896, Castle was elected to the Fifty-fifth Congress as a Populist with support from the Democrats, and served one term (March 4, 1897 – March 3, 1899). He was an unsuccessful candidate for reelection in 1898, and resumed practicing of medicine in Merced. In 1901, Castle moved to San Francisco, where he continued to practice medicine. In 1903, Castle moved to Dinuba, where he practiced medicine in addition to owning and operating a peach orchard, vineyard, and land for growing grapes that were used in producing raisins. Castle also had ownership stakes in companies that developed the Coalinga Oil Field.

== Retirement and death ==
Castle retired to Santa Barbara, California, where he lived until his death on July 12, 1928. He was cremated and the ashes were deposited in the mausoleum of the Santa Barbara Cemetery and Crematory.

== Family ==
Castle's first wife was Susan Alma Tabor, with whom he had two children, Grace Imogene Castle and Curtis Harvey Castle Jr. After her death, Castle married Virginia Nixon Wills, with whom he had four children, Paul Long Castle, Chandos Barret Castle, Mercedes Castle, and Genevieve Wills Castle. Paul Long Castle died shortly after his birth on the first of February 1892.

== Electoral history ==
United States House of Representatives elections, 1896
Party	Candidate	Votes	%
Populist	Curtis H. Castle	19,183	46.7
Republican	William W. Bowers (inc.)	18,939	46.1
Independent	William H. "Billy" Carlson	2,139	5.2
Prohibition	James W. Webb	802	2.0
Total votes		41,063	100.0
Turnout			
Populist gain from Republican			

United States House of Representatives elections, 1898
Party	Candidate	Votes	%
Republican	James C. Needham	20,793	50.1
Populist	Curtis H. Castle (incumbent)	20,680	49.9
Total votes		41,473	100.0
Turnout			
Republican gain from Populist			

== Sources ==
=== Books ===
- Guinn, James Miller (1905). History of the State of California and Biographical Record of the San Joaquin Valley, California. Chicago, IL: Chapman Publishing. p. 774.
- Spencer, Thomas E. (1998). Where They're Buried. Baltimore, MD: Clearfield Company, Inc. p. 153. ISBN 978-0-8063-4823-0.

=== Newspapers ===
- "Pioneer Mendecino Physician Succumbs". The Press Democrat. Santa Rosa, CA. Associated Press. July 13, 1928 – via Newspapers.com.

U.S. House of Representatives
Preceded by William W. Bowers	Member of the U.S. House of Representatives from California's 7th congressional district 1897–1899	Succeeded by James C. Needham
