= Marion Cannon =

American politician

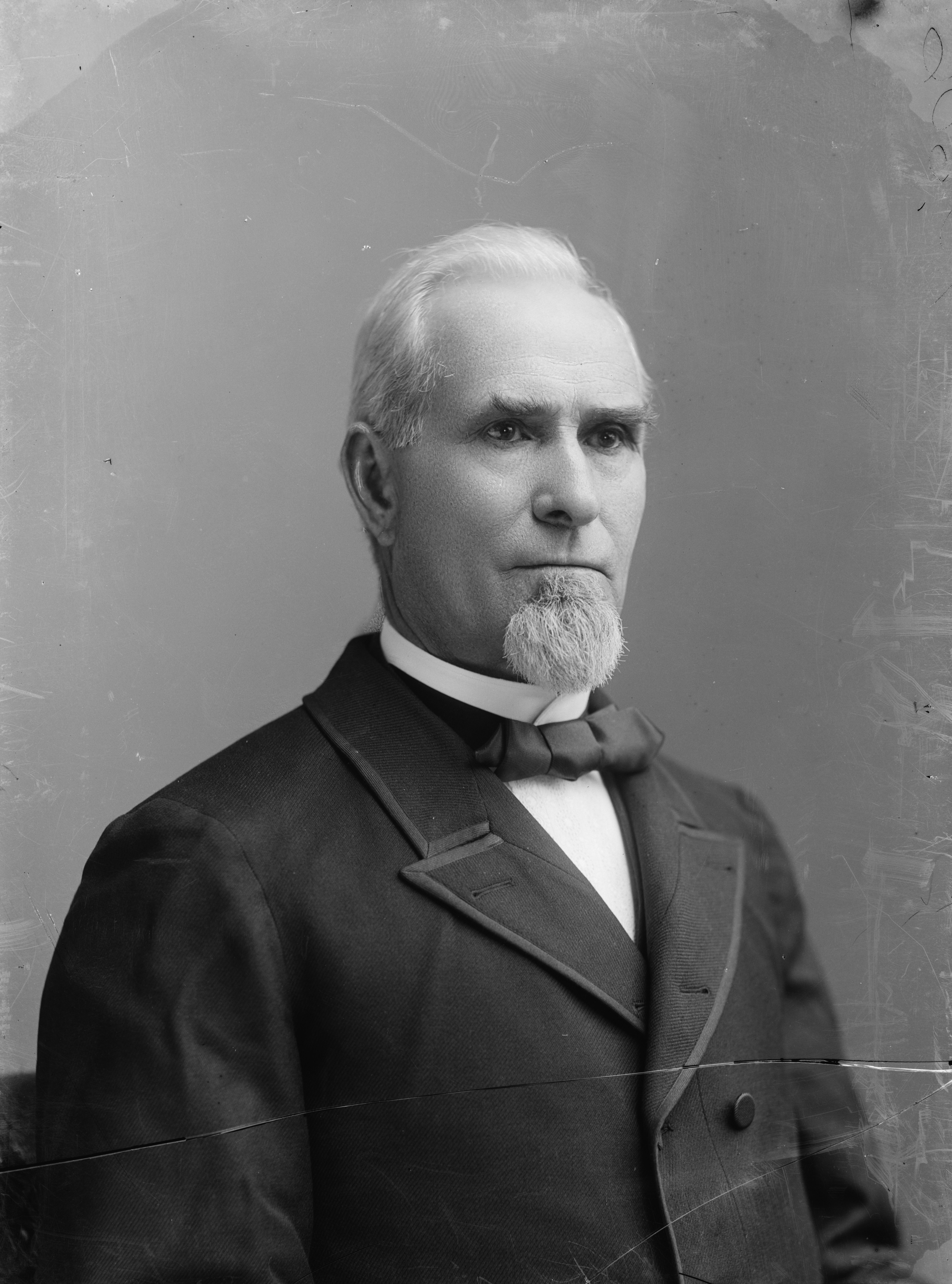
- Portrait by C. M. Bell, c. 1893–1894

Member of the U.S. House of Representatives from California's 6th district
- In office March 4, 1893 – March 3, 1895
- Preceded by: William W. Bowers
- Succeeded by: James McLachlan

Personal details
- Born: October 30, 1834 Morgantown, West Virginia, US
- Died: August 27, 1920 (aged 85) Ventura, California, US
- Resting place: Ivy Lawn Cemetery, Ventura
- Party: Populist

Marion Cannon (October 30, 1834 – August 27, 1920) was an American blacksmith and politician who served one term as a United States representative from California from 1893 to 1895.

== Early life and career ==
Cannon was born near Morgantown, Virginia (now in West Virginia) where he learned the blacksmith trade as a teenager and left home, carrying his blacksmith shop with him, from Mt. Morris, PA at the age of 18. He loaded his business onto a Conestoga wagon pulled by two oxen named Buck and Berry. Because of his oxen he had to walk the six months of his crossing. During this time he used his blacksmith's trade to replenish his supplies.He arrived with a wagon train in Salt Lake City in time to witness the laying of the foundation stone for the Mormon Temple.

He crossed the Sierra's to Diamond Springs arriving sometime in 1853. From there he sought a mining community where he could set up shop as a blacksmith. While in Diamond Springs he probably met the Holland family and around 1860 married Lydia Jane Holland, built a home, and began raising a family of 5 children in a place called Omega. He served as Grand Master of the Nevada City Masonic Lodge and also one term (two years) as the county recorder for Nevada County. At some point he bought the Volcan gold mine, which he then sold in 1874 to purchase acreage in Ventura, California on Telephone Road to engage in agricultural pursuits.

== Political career ==
November 20, 1890, Cannon was elected first State President of the Farmers’ Alliance and was reelected October 22, 1891.

=== Congress ===
He helped to organize the People's Party of California and was elected as a Populist to the Fifty-third Congress (March 4, 1893 - March 3, 1895), but was not a candidate for renomination in 1894.

== Later career ==
He was chosen as a representative to the Supreme Council in Indianapolis in November 1891 and was selected by that body to represent California in the industrial conference at St. Louis February 22, 1892. He was delegate to the People's Party National Convention in 1892.

=== Business ===
In Ventura he maintained his blacksmith shop business. He was listed as a blacksmith until the 1900 census. He also began farming, and ran in farming political and social circles. He did not think much of the post Civil War east coast, and was an ardent booster of the West for the rest of his life. He was a member of the California Grange, and, as a member of the Grange, was an ardent enemy of the railroads’ manipulation of costs for shipping produce. Marion Cannon was also a founding member of the Ventura Bank, which became the Bank of Italy, which later became the Bank of America.

== Death and burial ==
Cannon resumed agricultural pursuits until his death at Ranch Home, near Ventura, August 27, 1920. The Cannon family established a longstanding relationship with the Methodist church in Ventura. He was buried in Ivy Lawn Cemetery, Ventura, California.

== Electoral history ==
1892 United States House of Representatives elections
Party	Candidate	Votes	%
Populist	Marion Cannon	20,680	56.3
Republican	Hervey Lindley	14,271	38.8
Prohibition	O. R. Dougherty	1,805	4.9
Total votes		36,756	100.0
Populist gain from Republican			

U.S. House of Representatives
Preceded by William W. Bowers	Member of the U.S. House of Representatives from California's 6th congressional district 1893–1895	Succeeded by James McLachlan
