= Russell J. Waters =

American politician

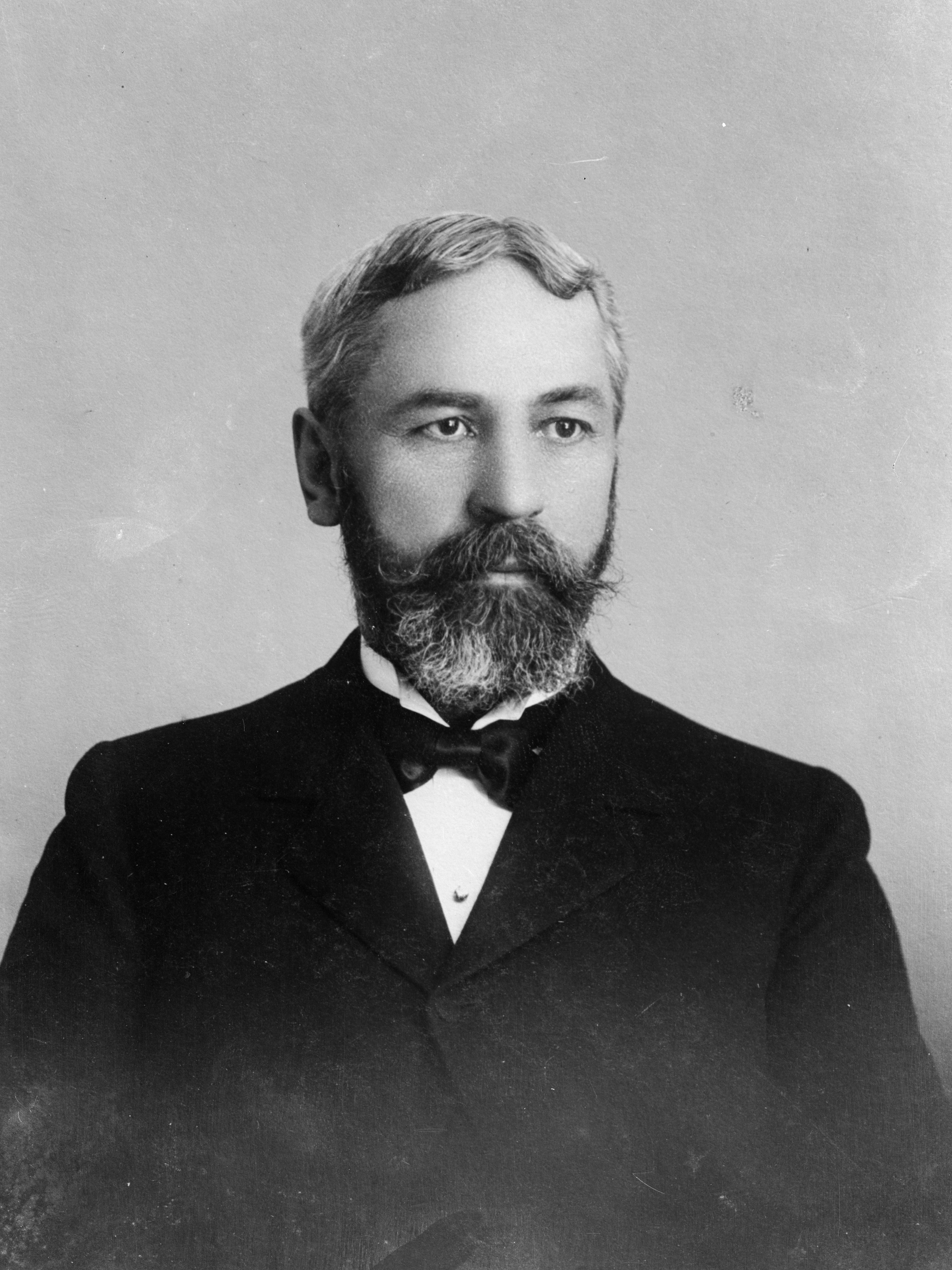
- Portrait by C. M. Bell c. 1899–1901

Member of the U.S. House of Representatives from California's 6th district
- In office March 4, 1899 – March 3, 1901
- Preceded by: Charles A. Barlow
- Succeeded by: James McLachlan

Personal details
- Born: Russell Judson Waters; June 6, 1843 Halifax, Vermont
- Died: September 25, 1911 (aged 68) Los Angeles, California
- Resting place: Hollywood Forever Cemetery
- Party: Republican

Russell Judson Waters (June 6, 1843 – September 25, 1911) was an American teacher, lawyer, businessman, author and one-term U.S. representative from California at the turn of the 20th century.

== Early life and education ==
Born in Halifax, Vermont, Waters moved with his parents to Franklin County, Massachusetts, in 1846. He attended the district schools. Learned the machinist's trade in Shelburne Falls, Massachusetts. He taught school at Charlemont Center, Massachusetts. He was graduated from Franklin Institute (later Arms Academy), Shelburne Falls, Massachusetts, where he later was professor of Latin and mathematics. He moved to Chicago, Illinois, in 1867. He studied law. He was admitted to the bar in 1868 and practiced in Chicago until 1886.

== Career ==
He moved to California and settled in Redlands in 1886, serving as city attorney of Redlands in 1888. He moved to Los Angeles in 1894. He served as president of the Pasadena Consolidated Gas Co., treasurer of the Los Angeles Chamber of Commerce, and vice president of the Citizens' Bank, and was connected with many public institutions.

=== Congress ===
Waters was elected as a Republican to the Fifty-sixth Congress (March 4, 1899 – March 3, 1901). He was not a candidate for renomination in 1900.

== Later career ==
He resumed banking as president of the Citizens' National Bank, Los Angeles. He served as president of the California Cattle Co., San Jacinto, California, from 1903 to 1911. He served as president of the San Jacinto Water Co. in 1910 and 1911.

=== Death and burial ===
He died in Los Angeles, California, September 25, 1911, and was interred in Hollywood Cemetery.

== Electoral history ==
1898 United States House of Representatives elections
Party	Candidate	Votes	%
Republican	Russell J. Waters	24,050	52.6
Populist	Charles A. Barlow (Incumbent)	20,499	44.9
Socialist Labor	James T. Van Ransselaer	1,132	2.5
Total votes		45,681	100.0
Republican gain from Populist			

== Bibliography ==
- Lyric Echos. Los Angeles, CA: Times-Mirror Printing and Binding House, 1907.
- El Estranjero (The stranger): a story a Southern California. Chicago, New York: Rand, McNally & company, 1910.

== Sources ==
- United States Congress. "Russell J. Waters (id: W000188)". Biographical Directory of the United States Congress.

U.S. House of Representatives
Preceded by Charles A. Barlow	Member of the U.S. House of Representatives from California's 6th congressional district 1899–1901	Succeeded by James McLachlan
