= California's 6th congressional district =

U.S. House district for California

Coordinates: 38.56°N 121.47°W

- Interactive map of district boundaries
- Representative: Ami Bera; D–Elk Grove
- Population (2025): 758,488
- Median household income: $91,562
- Ethnicity: 47.2% White; 23.0% Hispanic; 12.0% Asian; 8.9% Black; 6.9% Two or more races; 2.0% other
- Cook PVI: D+8

California's 6th US congressional district is entirely in Sacramento County and includes the north side of the city of Sacramento and its suburbs of Rosemont, Rancho Cordova, Citrus Heights, Rio Linda, Elverta, Arden-Arcade, Antelope, Foothill Farms, North Highlands, and most of Fair Oaks.

The district is represented since 2023 by Ami Bera, a Democrat, who was re-elected in 2024. Prior to redistricting by the California Citizens Redistricting Commission of 2021, the district included the entire city of Sacramento and some of its suburbs. The district was represented by Democrat Doris Matsui.

== Recent election results from statewide races ==
Year	Office	Results
2008	President	Obama 57% - 43%
2010	Governor	Brown 54% - 41%
2010	Lt. Governor	Newsom 46% - 44%
2010	Secretary of State	Bowen 51% - 40%
2010	Attorney General	Cooley 49% - 42%
2010	Treasurer	Lockyer 55% - 38%
2010	Controller	Chiang 60% - 34%
2012	President	Obama 57% - 43%
2014	Governor	Brown 59% - 41%
2016	President	Clinton 55% - 38%
2018	Governor	Newsom 55% - 45%
2018	Attorney General	Becerra 57% - 43%
2020	President	Biden 58% - 39%
2022	Senate (Reg.)	Padilla 57% - 43%
2022	Governor	Newsom 54% - 46%
2022	Lt. Governor	Kounalakis 56% - 44%
2022	Secretary of State	Weber 56% - 44%
2022	Attorney General	Bonta 55% - 45%
2022	Treasurer	Ma 55% - 45%
2022	Controller	Cohen 52% - 48%
2024	President	Harris 55% - 41%
2024	Senate (Reg.)	Schiff 56% - 44%

== Composition ==
FIPS County Code	County	Seat	Population
67	Sacramento	Sacramento	1,588,921

Under the 2020 redistricting, California's 6th district is located in an area of Sacramento County that includes the north side of the city of Sacramento; the cities of Citrus Heights and Rancho Cordova; and the census-designated places Antelope, Arden-Arcade, Carmichael, Elverta, Fair Oaks, Foothill Farms, Gold River, Mather, McClellan Park, North Highlands, La Riviera, Rosemont, and Rio Linda.

Sacramento County is split between this district and both the 3rd district and 7th district. The 6th and 3rd districts are partitioned by Latrobe Rd, Scott Rd, Deer Creek, Carson Creek, Nimbus Rd, E3 Highway, Illinois Ave, Madison Ave, Kenneth Ave, Wachtel Way, and Old Auburn Rd. The 6th and 7th districts are partitioned by the Sacramento River, American River, Fair Oaks Blvd, Watt Ave, Kiefer Blvd, Highway 16, Bradshaw Rd, Highway E2, and Stonehouse Dr.

=== Cities and CDPs with 10,000 or more people ===
- Sacramento – 524,943
- Arden-Arcade – 94,659
- Citrus Heights – 87,583
- Carmichael – 79,793
- Rancho Cordova – 79,332
- North Highlands – 49,327
- Antelope – 48,733
- Foothill Farms – 33,121
- Fair Oaks – 32,514
- Rosemont – 23,510
- Rio Linda – 15,944
- La Riviera – 11,252

=== 2,500 – 10,000 people ===
- Gold River – 7,912
- Elverta – 5,492
- Mather – 4,698

== Future composition ==
Beginning with the 2026 election, the 6th district will consist of the following counties:

- Placer (part)
- Sacramento (part)
- Yolo (part)

== List of members representing the district ==
Member	Party	Dates	Cong ress(es)	Electoral history	Counties
District created March 4, 1885
Henry Markham (Pasadena)	Republican	March 4, 1885 – March 3, 1887	49th	Elected in 1884. Retired.	1885–1893; Alpine, Fresno, Inyo, Kern, Los Angeles, Mono, Monterey, San Benito, San Bernardino, San Diego, San Luis Obispo, Santa Barbara, Tulare, Ventura
William Vandever (San Buenaventura)	Republican	March 4, 1887 – March 3, 1891	50th 51st	Elected in 1886. Re-elected in 1888. Retired.	1885–1893; Alpine, Fresno, Inyo, Kern, Los Angeles, Mono, Monterey, San Benito, San Bernardino, San Diego, San Luis Obispo, Santa Barbara, Tulare, Ventura
William W. Bowers (San Diego)	Republican	March 4, 1891 – March 3, 1893	52nd	Elected in 1890. Redistricted to the 7th district.	1885–1893; Alpine, Fresno, Inyo, Kern, Los Angeles, Mono, Monterey, San Benito, San Bernardino, San Diego, San Luis Obispo, Santa Barbara, Tulare, Ventura
Marion Cannon (Ventura)	Populist	March 4, 1893 – March 3, 1895	53rd	Elected in 1892. Retired.	1893–1903; Los Angeles, Monterey, San Luis Obispo, Santa Barbara, Santa Cruz, Ventura
James McLachlan (Pasadena)	Republican	March 4, 1895 – March 3, 1897	54th	Elected in 1894. Lost re-election.	1893–1903; Los Angeles, Monterey, San Luis Obispo, Santa Barbara, Santa Cruz, Ventura
Charles A. Barlow (San Luis Obispo)	Populist	March 4, 1897 – March 3, 1899	55th	Elected in 1896. Lost re-election.	1893–1903; Los Angeles, Monterey, San Luis Obispo, Santa Barbara, Santa Cruz, Ventura
Russell J. Waters (Los Angeles)	Republican	March 4, 1899 – March 3, 1901	56th	Elected in 1898. Retired.	1893–1903; Los Angeles, Monterey, San Luis Obispo, Santa Barbara, Santa Cruz, Ventura
James McLachlan (Pasadena)	Republican	March 4, 1901 – March 3, 1903	57th	Elected in 1900. Redistricted to the 7th district.	1893–1903; Los Angeles, Monterey, San Luis Obispo, Santa Barbara, Santa Cruz, Ventura
James C. Needham (Modesto)	Republican	March 4, 1903 – March 3, 1913	58th 59th 60th 61st 62nd	Redistricted from the 7th district and re-elected in 1902. Re-elected in 1904. Re-elected in 1906. Re-elected in 1908. Re-elected in 1910. Lost re-election.	1903–1913; Fresno, Kings, Madera, Merced, Monterey, San Benito, San Joaquin, Santa Cruz, Stanislaus
Joseph R. Knowland (Alameda)	Republican	March 4, 1913 – March 3, 1915	63rd	Redistricted from the 3rd district and re-elected in 1912. Retired to run for U.S. Senate.	1903–1943; Alameda
John A. Elston (Berkeley)	Progressive	March 4, 1915 – March 3, 1917	64th 65th 66th 67th	Elected in 1914. Re-elected in 1916. Re-elected in 1918. Re-elected in 1920. Died.	1903–1943; Alameda
John A. Elston (Berkeley)	Republican	March 4, 1917 – December 15, 1921	64th 65th 66th 67th	Elected in 1914. Re-elected in 1916. Re-elected in 1918. Re-elected in 1920. Died.	1903–1943; Alameda
Vacant		December 15, 1921 – November 7, 1922	67th		1903–1943; Alameda
James H. MacLafferty (Oakland)	Republican	November 7, 1922 – March 3, 1925	67th 68th	Elected to finish Elston's term. Re-elected in 1922. Lost renomination.	1903–1943; Alameda
Albert E. Carter (Oakland)	Republican	March 4, 1925 – January 3, 1945	69th 70th 71st 72nd 73rd 74th 75th 76th 77th 78th	Elected in 1924. Re-elected in 1926. Re-elected in 1928. Re-elected in 1930. Re-elected in 1932. Re-elected in 1934. Re-elected in 1936. Re-elected in 1938. Re-elected in 1940. Re-elected in 1942. Lost re-election.	1903–1943; Alameda
Albert E. Carter (Oakland)	Republican	March 4, 1925 – January 3, 1945	69th 70th 71st 72nd 73rd 74th 75th 76th 77th 78th	Elected in 1924. Re-elected in 1926. Re-elected in 1928. Re-elected in 1930. Re-elected in 1932. Re-elected in 1934. Re-elected in 1936. Re-elected in 1938. Re-elected in 1940. Re-elected in 1942. Lost re-election.	1943–1953; Alameda, Contra Costa
George P. Miller (Alameda)	Democratic	January 3, 1945 – January 3, 1953	79th 80th 81st 82nd	Elected in 1944. Re-elected in 1946. Re-elected in 1948. Re-elected in 1950. Redistricted to the 8th district.	1943–1953; Alameda, Contra Costa
Robert Condon (Walnut Creek)	Democratic	January 3, 1953 – January 3, 1955	83rd	Elected in 1952. Lost re-election.	1953–1963; Solano, Contra Costa
John F. Baldwin Jr. (Martinez)	Republican	January 3, 1955 – January 3, 1963	84th 85th 86th 87th	Elected in 1954. Re-elected in 1956. Re-elected in 1958. Re-elected in 1960. Redistricted to the 14th district.	1953–1963; Solano, Contra Costa
William S. Mailliard (San Francisco)	Republican	January 3, 1963 – March 5, 1974	88th 89th 90th 91st 92nd 93rd	Redistricted from the 4th district and re-elected in 1962. Re-elected in 1964. Re-elected in 1966. Re-elected in 1968. Re-elected in 1970. Re-elected in 1972. Resigned to become U.S. Representative to the Organization of American States.	1963–1969; San Francisco
William S. Mailliard (San Francisco)	Republican	January 3, 1963 – March 5, 1974	88th 89th 90th 91st 92nd 93rd	Redistricted from the 4th district and re-elected in 1962. Re-elected in 1964. Re-elected in 1966. Re-elected in 1968. Re-elected in 1970. Re-elected in 1972. Resigned to become U.S. Representative to the Organization of American States.	1969–1973; Southeast Marin, western San Francisco
William S. Mailliard (San Francisco)	Republican	January 3, 1963 – March 5, 1974	88th 89th 90th 91st 92nd 93rd	Redistricted from the 4th district and re-elected in 1962. Re-elected in 1964. Re-elected in 1966. Re-elected in 1968. Re-elected in 1970. Re-elected in 1972. Resigned to become U.S. Representative to the Organization of American States.	1973–1983; Marin, western San Francisco
Vacant		March 5, 1974 – June 4, 1974	93rd		1973–1983; Marin, western San Francisco
John Burton (San Francisco)	Democratic	June 4, 1974 – January 3, 1975	93rd	Elected to finish Mailliard's term. Redistricted to the 5th district.	1973–1983; Marin, western San Francisco
Phillip Burton (San Francisco)	Democratic	January 3, 1975 – January 3, 1983	94th 95th 96th 97th	Redistricted from the 5th district and re-elected in 1974. Re-elected in 1976. Re-elected in 1978. Re-elected in 1980. Redistricted to the 5th district.	Most of San Francisco
Barbara Boxer (Greenbrae)	Democratic	January 3, 1983 – January 3, 1993	98th 99th 100th 101st 102nd	Elected in 1982. Re-elected in 1984. Re-elected in 1986. Re-elected in 1988. Re-elected in 1990. Retired to run for U.S. senator.	1983–1993; Marin, eastern San Francisco, San Mateo (Daly City), far southwestern Solano, southern Sonoma
Lynn Woolsey (Petaluma)	Democratic	January 3, 1993 – January 3, 2013	103rd 104th 105th 106th 107th 108th 109th 110th 111th 112th	Elected in 1992. Re-elected in 1994. Re-elected in 1996. Re-elected in 1998. Re-elected in 2000. Re-elected in 2002. Re-elected in 2004; Re-elected in 2006. Re-elected in 2008. Re-elected in 2010. Retired.	1993–2003; Marin and southern Sonoma
Lynn Woolsey (Petaluma)	Democratic	January 3, 1993 – January 3, 2013	103rd 104th 105th 106th 107th 108th 109th 110th 111th 112th	Elected in 1992. Re-elected in 1994. Re-elected in 1996. Re-elected in 1998. Re-elected in 2000. Re-elected in 2002. Re-elected in 2004; Re-elected in 2006. Re-elected in 2008. Re-elected in 2010. Retired.	2003–2013 Marin and southern Sonoma
Doris Matsui (Sacramento)	Democratic	January 3, 2013 – January 3, 2023	113th 114th 115th 116th 117th	Redistricted from the 5th district and re-elected in 2012. Re-elected in 2014. Re-elected in 2016. Re-elected in 2018. Re-elected in 2020. Redistricted to the 7th district.	2013–2023 Portions of Sacramento and Yolo Counties, including the city of Sacramento
Ami Bera (Elk Grove)	Democratic	January 3, 2023 – present	118th 119th	Redistricted from the 7th district and re-elected in 2022. Re-elected in 2024. Redistricted to the 3rd district.	2023–2027: southern Sacramento County, part of Yolo County, and a tiny portion of Solano County, all of Sacramento south of the American River, including Downtown Sacramento, West Sacramento, Elk Grove, and Galt
Richard Pan (Sacramento)	Democratic	Taking office on January 3, 2027		Elected in 2026.	

== Election results for members ==
=== 1884 ===
1884 United States House of Representatives elections
Party	Candidate	Votes	%
Republican	Henry Markham	17,397	49.1
Democratic	R. A. Del Valle	16,990	47.9
Prohibition	Will D. Gould	821	2.3
Populist	Isaac Kinley	237	0.7
Total votes		35,445	100.0
Republican win (new seat)			

=== 1886 ===
1886 United States House of Representatives elections
Party	Candidate	Votes	%
Republican	William Vandever	18,259	47.3
Democratic	Joseph D. Lynch	18,204	47.1
Prohibition	W. A. Harris	2,159	5.6
Total votes		38,622	100.0
Republican hold			

=== 1888 ===
1888 United States House of Representatives elections
Party	Candidate	Votes	%
Republican	William Vandever (Incumbent)	35,406	52.5
Democratic	Reel B. Terry	29,453	43.7
Prohibition	J. G. Miller	2,375	3.5
Know Nothing	Alfred Daggett	150	0.2
Total votes		67,384	100.0
Republican hold			

=== 1890 ===
1890 United States House of Representatives elections
Party	Candidate	Votes	%
Republican	William W. Bowers	33,522	51.1
Democratic	W. J. Curtis	28,904	44.1
Prohibition	O. R. Dougherty	3,130	4.8
Total votes		65,556	100.0
Republican hold			

=== 1892 ===
1892 United States House of Representatives elections
Party	Candidate	Votes	%
Populist	Marion Cannon	20,680	56.3
Republican	Hervey Lindley	14,271	38.8
Prohibition	O. R. Dougherty	1,805	4.9
Total votes		36,756	100.0
Populist gain from Republican			

=== 1894 ===
1894 United States House of Representatives elections
Party	Candidate	Votes	%
Republican	James McLachlan	18,746	44.3
Democratic	George S. Patton	11,693	27.6
Populist	W. C. Bowman	9,769	23.1
Prohibition	J. E. McComas	2,120	5.0
Total votes		42,328	100.0
Republican gain from Populist			

=== 1896 ===
1896 United States House of Representatives elections
Party	Candidate	Votes	%
Populist	Charles A. Barlow	24,157	48.9
Republican	James McLachlan (Incumbent)	23,494	47.6
Prohibition	Henry Clay Needham	1,196	2.4
Socialist Labor	Job Harriman	542	1.1
Total votes		49,389	100.0
Populist gain from Republican			

=== 1898 ===
1898 United States House of Representatives elections
Party	Candidate	Votes	%
Republican	Russell J. Waters	24,050	52.6
Populist	Charles A. Barlow (Incumbent)	20,499	44.9
Socialist Labor	James T. Van Ransselaer	1,132	2.5
Total votes		45,681	100.0
Republican gain from Populist			

=== 1900 ===
1900 United States House of Representatives elections
Party	Candidate	Votes	%
Republican	James McLachlan	27,081	51.8
Democratic	William Graves	19,793	37.9
Socialist	H. G. Wilshire	3,674	7.0
Prohibition	James Campbell	1,693	3.2
Total votes		52,241	100.0
Republican hold			

=== 1902 ===
1902 United States House of Representatives elections
Party	Candidate	Votes	%
Republican	James C. Needham (Incumbent)	17,268	53.5
Democratic	Gaston M. Ashe	13,732	42.5
Socialist	J. L. Cobb	815	2.5
Prohibition	Joel H. Smith	466	1.4
Total votes		32,281	100.0
Republican hold			

=== 1904 ===
1904 United States House of Representatives elections
Party	Candidate	Votes	%
Republican	James C. Needham (Incumbent)	18,828	55.1
Democratic	William M. Conley	13,074	38.2
Socialist	J. L. Cobb	1,537	4.5
Prohibition	Joel H. Smith	740	2.2
Total votes		34,079	100.0
Republican hold			

=== 1906 ===
1906 United States House of Representatives elections
Party	Candidate	Votes	%
Republican	James C. Needham (Incumbent)	18,928	55.6
Democratic	Harry A. Greene	12,868	37.8
Socialist	Richard Kirk	1,303	3.8
Prohibition	Herman E. Burbank	964	2.8
Total votes		34,063	100.0
Republican hold			

=== 1908 ===
1908 United States House of Representatives elections
Party	Candidate	Votes	%
Republican	James C. Needham (Incumbent)	21,323	52.0
Democratic	Fred P. Feliz	15,868	38.7
Socialist	W. M. Pattison	2,288	5.6
Prohibition	James W. Webb	1,509	3.7
Total votes		40,988	100.0
Republican hold			

=== 1910 ===
1910 United States House of Representatives elections
Party	Candidate	Votes	%
Republican	James C. Needham (Incumbent)	19,717	47.3
Democratic	A. L. Cowell	18,408	44.2
Socialist	Richard Kirk	2,568	6.2
Prohibition	Ira E. Surface	951	2.3
Total votes		41,644	100.0
Republican hold			

=== 1912 ===
1912 United States House of Representatives elections
Party	Candidate	Votes	%
Republican	Joseph R. Knowland (Incumbent)	35,219	53.7
Socialist	J. Stitt Wilson	26,234	40.0
Democratic	Hiram A. Luttrell	4,135	6.3
Total votes		65,588	100.0
Republican hold			

=== 1914 ===
1914 United States House of Representatives elections
Party	Candidate	Votes	%
Progressive	John A. Elston		44.4
Republican	George H. Derrick		37.7
Socialist	Howard H. Caldwell		13.9
Prohibition	Harlow E. Wolcott		3.9
Total votes			100.0
Progressive gain from Republican			

=== 1916 ===
1916 United States House of Representatives elections
Party	Candidate	Votes	%
Republican	John A. Elston (Incumbent)	56,520	64.6
Democratic	H. Avery Whitney	19,787	22.6
Socialist	Luella Twining	7,588	8.7
Prohibition	Harlow E. Wolcott	3,605	4.1
Total votes		87,500	100.0
Republican hold			

=== 1918 ===
1918 United States House of Representatives elections
Party	Candidate	Votes	%
Republican	John A. Elston (Incumbent)	59,082	88.4
Socialist	Luella Twining	7,721	11.6
Total votes		66,803	100.0
Republican hold			

=== 1920 ===
1920 United States House of Representatives elections
Party	Candidate	Votes	%
Republican	John A. Elston (Incumbent)	75,610	83.3
Democratic	Maynard Shipley	15,151	16.7
Total votes		90,761	100.0
Republican hold			

=== 1922 (Special) ===
1922 Special election
Candidate	Votes	%
James H. MacLafferty		68.4
Hugh W. Brunk		31.6
Total votes		100.0
Turnout	{{{votes}}}	%

=== 1922 ===
1922 United States House of Representatives elections
Party	Candidate	Votes	%
Republican	James H. MacLafferty (Incumbent)	59,858	66.4
Democratic	Hugh W. Brunk	22,711	25.2
Socialist	Elvina S. Beals	7,616	8.4
Total votes		90,185	100.0
Republican hold			

=== 1924 ===
1924 United States House of Representatives elections
Party	Candidate	Votes	%
Republican	Albert E. Carter	68,547	57.5
Independent	John L. Davie	42,873	35.9
Socialist	Herbert L. Coggins	7,858	6.6
Total votes		119,278	100.0
Republican hold			

=== 1926 ===
1926 United States House of Representatives elections
Party	Candidate	Votes	%
Republican	Albert E. Carter (Incumbent)	91,995	100.0
Republican hold			

=== 1928 ===
1928 United States House of Representatives elections
Party	Candidate	Votes	%
Republican	Albert E. Carter (Incumbent)	113,579	100.0
Republican hold			

=== 1930 ===
1930 United States House of Representatives elections
Party	Candidate	Votes	%
Republican	Albert E. Carter (Incumbent)	110,190	100.0
Republican hold			

=== 1932 ===
1932 United States House of Representatives elections
Party	Candidate	Votes	%
Republican	Albert E. Carter (Incumbent)	75,528	100.0
Republican hold			

=== 1934 ===
1934 United States House of Representatives elections
Party	Candidate	Votes	%
Republican	Albert E. Carter (Incumbent)	93,213	100.0
Republican hold			

=== 1936 ===
1936 United States House of Representatives elections
Party	Candidate	Votes	%
Republican	Albert E. Carter (Incumbent)	103,712	91.0
Socialist	Clarence E. Rust	8,247	7.2
Communist	Lloyd L. Harris	2,021	1.8
Total votes		113,980	100.0
Republican hold			

=== 1938 ===
1938 United States House of Representatives elections
Party	Candidate	Votes	%
Republican	Albert E. Carter (Incumbent)	118,632	94.4
Communist	Dave L. Saunders	7,015	5.6
Total votes		125,647	100.0
Republican hold			

=== 1940 ===
1940 United States House of Representatives elections
Party	Candidate	Votes	%
Republican	Albert E. Carter (Incumbent)	131,584	96
Communist	Clarence Paton	5,426	4
Total votes		137,010	100
Republican hold			

=== 1942 ===
1942 United States House of Representatives elections
Party	Candidate	Votes	%
Republican	Albert E. Carter (Incumbent)	108,585	92.6
Communist	Clarence Paton	8,532	7.3
No party	William H. Hollander (write-in)	185	0.1
Total votes		117,302	100.0
Republican hold			

=== 1944 ===
1944 United States House of Representatives elections
Party	Candidate	Votes	%
Democratic	George Paul Miller	104,441	52
Republican	Albert E. Carter (Incumbent)	96,395	48
Total votes		200,836	100.0
Democratic gain from Republican			

=== 1946 ===
1946 United States House of Representatives elections
Party	Candidate	Votes	%
Democratic	George P. Miller (Incumbent)	118,548	100.0
Democratic hold			

=== 1948 ===
1948 United States House of Representatives elections
Party	Candidate	Votes	%
Democratic	George P. Miller (Incumbent)	194,985	100.0
Democratic hold			

=== 1950 ===
1950 United States House of Representatives elections
Party	Candidate	Votes	%
Democratic	George P. Miller (Incumbent)	192,342	100.0
Democratic hold			

=== 1952 ===
1952 United States House of Representatives elections
Party	Candidate	Votes	%
Democratic	Robert Condon	87,768	50.6
Republican	John F. Baldwin Jr.	85,756	49.4
Total votes		173,524	100.0
Democratic win (new seat)			

=== 1954 ===
1954 United States House of Representatives elections
Party	Candidate	Votes	%
Republican	John F. Baldwin Jr.	72,336	50.9
Democratic	Robert Condon (Incumbent)	69,776	49.1
Total votes		142,112	100.0
Republican gain from Democratic			

=== 1956 ===
1956 United States House of Representatives elections
Party	Candidate	Votes	%
Republican	John F. Baldwin Jr. (Incumbent)	98,683	53.7
Democratic	H. Roberts Quinney	84,965	46.3
Total votes		183,648	100.0
Republican hold			

=== 1958 ===
1958 United States House of Representatives elections
Party	Candidate	Votes	%
Republican	John F. Baldwin Jr. (Incumbent)	92,669	51
Democratic	Howard H. Jewel	89,192	49
Total votes		181,861	100
Republican hold			

=== 1960 ===
1960 United States House of Representatives elections
Party	Candidate	Votes	%
Republican	John F. Baldwin Jr. (Incumbent)	128,418	58.7
Democratic	Douglas R. Page	90,260	41.3
Total votes		218,678	100.0
Republican hold			

=== 1962 ===
1962 United States House of Representatives elections
Party	Candidate	Votes	%
Republican	William S. Mailliard (Incumbent)	105,762	58.7
Democratic	John A. O'Connell	74,429	41.3
Total votes		180,191	100.0
Republican hold			

=== 1964 ===
1964 United States House of Representatives elections
Party	Candidate	Votes	%
Republican	William S. Mailliard (Incumbent)	125,869	63.6
Democratic	Thomas P. O'Toole	71,894	36.3
Total votes		197,763	100.0
Republican hold			

=== 1966 ===
1966 United States House of Representatives elections
Party	Candidate	Votes	%
Republican	William S. Mailliard (Incumbent)	132,506	76.6
Democratic	Le Rue Grim	40,514	23.4
Total votes		173,020	100.0
Republican hold			

=== 1968 ===
1968 United States House of Representatives elections
Party	Candidate	Votes	%
Republican	William S. Mailliard (Incumbent)	140,071	72.8
Democratic	Phillip Drath	52,433	27.2
Total votes		192,504	100.0
Republican hold			

=== 1970 ===
1970 United States House of Representatives elections
Party	Candidate	Votes	%
Republican	William S. Mailliard (Incumbent)	96,393	53.3
Democratic	Russell R. Miller	84,255	46.6
Total votes		180,648	100.0
Republican hold			

=== 1972 ===
1972 United States House of Representatives elections
Party	Candidate	Votes	%
Republican	William S. Mailliard (Incumbent)	118,197	52.0
Democratic	Roger Boas	108,934	48.0
Total votes		227,131	100.0
Republican hold			

=== 1974 (Special) ===
1974 Special election
Party	Candidate	Votes	%
Democratic	John Burton		50.0
Republican	Thomas Caylor		21.1
Democratic	Terrence "T.V." McGuire		8.7
Republican	Jean Wall		5.8
Republican	Sean McCarthy		5.3
Democratic	Alan F. Reeves		4.1
Republican	Wesley Wilkes		2.7
Democratic	Leslie Alan Grant		2.1
Total votes			100.0
Democratic gain from Republican			

=== 1974 ===
1974 United States House of Representatives elections
Party	Candidate	Votes	%
Democratic	Phillip Burton	84,585	71.3
Republican	Tom Spinosa	25,721	21.7
Peace and Freedom	Emily Siegel	4,753	4.0
American Independent	Carl Richard Davis	3,456	2.9
Total votes		118,515	100.0
Democratic hold			

=== 1976 ===
1976 United States House of Representatives elections
Party	Candidate	Votes	%
Democratic	Phillip Burton (Incumbent)	86,493	66.1
Republican	Tom Spinosa	35,359	27.0
Peace and Freedom	Emily Siegel	6,570	5.0
American Independent	Raymond O. Heaps	2,494	1.9
Total votes		130,916	100.0
Democratic hold			

=== 1978 ===
1978 United States House of Representatives elections
Party	Candidate	Votes	%
Democratic	Phillip Burton (Incumbent)	81,801	68.3
Republican	Tom Spinosa	33,515	27.9
American Independent	Raymond O. Heaps	4,452	3.7
Total votes		119,768	100.0
Democratic hold			

=== 1980 ===
1980 United States House of Representatives elections
Party	Candidate	Votes	%
Democratic	Phillip Burton (Incumbent)	93,400	69.3
Republican	Tom Spinosa	34,500	25.6
Libertarian	Roy Childs	6,750	5.0
Total votes		134,650	100.0
Democratic hold			

=== 1982 ===
1982 United States House of Representatives elections
Party	Candidate	Votes	%
Democratic	Barbara Boxer	96,379	52.3
Republican	Dennis McQuaid	82,128	44.6
Libertarian	Howard Crieghton	3,191	1.7
Peace and Freedom	Timothy-Allen Albertson	2,366	1.3
Total votes		184,064	100.0
Democratic hold			

=== 1984 ===
1984 United States House of Representatives elections
Party	Candidate	Votes	%
Democratic	Barbara Boxer (Incumbent)	162,511	67.9
Republican	Douglas Binderup	71,011	29.7
Libertarian	Howard Crieghton	5,574	2.3
Total votes		239,096	100.0
Democratic hold			

=== 1986 ===
1986 United States House of Representatives elections
Party	Candidate	Votes	%
Democratic	Barbara Boxer (Incumbent)	142,946	73.8
Republican	Franklin Ernst III	50,606	26.1
Total votes		193,552	100.0
Democratic hold			

=== 1988 ===
1988 United States House of Representatives elections
Party	Candidate	Votes	%
Democratic	Barbara Boxer (Incumbent)	176,645	73.3
Republican	William Steinmetz	64,174	26.6
Total votes		240,819	100.0
Democratic hold			

=== 1990 ===
1990 United States House of Representatives elections
Party	Candidate	Votes	%
Democratic	Barbara Boxer (Incumbent)	137,306	68.1
Republican	Bill Boerum	64,402	31.9
Total votes		201,708	100.0
Democratic hold			

=== 1992 ===
1992 United States House of Representatives elections
Party	Candidate	Votes	%
Democratic	Lynn Woolsey	190,322	65.2
Republican	Bill Filante	98,171	33.6
No party	Write-in	3,293	1.1
Total votes		291,786	100.0
Democratic hold			

=== 1994 ===
1994 United States House of Representatives elections
Party	Candidate	Votes	%
Democratic	Lynn Woolsey (Incumbent)	137,642	58.1
Republican	Michael J. Nugent	88,940	37.5
Libertarian	Louis Beary	6,203	2.6
Peace and Freedom	Ernest K. Jones Jr.	4,055	1.7
Total votes		236,840	100.0
Democratic hold			

=== 1996 ===
1996 United States House of Representatives elections
Party	Candidate	Votes	%
Democratic	Lynn Woolsey (Incumbent)	156,958	61.6
Republican	Duane C. Hughes	86,278	33.8
Peace and Freedom	Ernest K. Jones Jr.	6,459	2.5
Natural Law	Bruce Kendall	5,240	2.1
Total votes		254,935	100.0
Democratic hold			

=== 1998 ===
1998 United States House of Representatives elections
Party	Candidate	Votes	%
Democratic	Lynn Woolsey (Incumbent)	158,446	68.0
Republican	Ken McAuliffe	69,295	29.7
Natural Law	Alan R. Barreca	5,240	2.2
Total votes		232,981	100.0
Democratic hold			

=== 2000 ===
2000 United States House of Representatives elections in California
Party	Candidate	Votes	%
Democratic	Lynn Woolsey (Incumbent)	182,166	64.3
Republican	Ken McAuliffe	80,169	28.3
Green	Justin Moscoso	13,248	4.7
Libertarian	Richard O. Barton	4,691	1.9
Natural Law	Alan R. Barreca	2,894	1.1
Total votes		283,118	100.0
Democratic hold			

=== 2002 ===
2002 United States House of Representatives elections in California
Party	Candidate	Votes	%
Democratic	Lynn Woolsey (Incumbent)	139,750	66.7
Republican	Paul L. Erickson	62,052	29.7
Libertarian	Richard O. Barton	4,936	2.3
Reform	Jeff Rainforth	2,825	1.3
Total votes		209,563	100.0
Democratic hold			

=== 2004 ===
2004 United States House of Representatives elections in California
Party	Candidate	Votes	%
Democratic	Lynn Woolsey (Incumbent)	226,423	72.7
Republican	Paul L. Erickson	85,244	27.3
Total votes		311,667	100.0
Democratic hold			

=== 2006 ===
2006 United States House of Representatives elections in California
Party	Candidate	Votes	%
Democratic	Lynn Woolsey (Incumbent)	173,190	70.3
Republican	Todd Hooper	64,405	26.1
Libertarian	Richard W. Friesen	9,028	3.6
Total votes		246,623	100.0
Democratic hold			

=== 2008 ===
2008 United States House of Representatives elections in California
Party	Candidate	Votes	%
Democratic	Lynn Woolsey (Incumbent)	229,672	71.7
Republican	Mike Halliwell	77,073	24.1
Libertarian	Joel R. Smolen	13,617	4.2
Total votes		320,362	100.0
Democratic hold			

=== 2010 ===
2010 United States House of Representatives elections in California
Party	Candidate	Votes	%
Democratic	Lynn Woolsey (Incumbent)	172,216	66
Republican	Jim Judd	77,361	30
Peace and Freedom	Eugene E. Ruyle	5,915	2%
Libertarian	Joel R. Smolen	5,660	2%
Total votes		261,152	100
Democratic hold			

=== 2012 ===
United States House of Representatives elections, 2012
Party	Candidate	Votes	%
Democratic	Doris Matsui (Incumbent)	160,667	75.1%
Republican	Joseph Mc Cray, Sr.	53,406	24.9%
Total votes		214,073	100.0%
Democratic hold			

=== 2014 ===
United States House of Representatives elections, 2014
Party	Candidate	Votes	%
Democratic	Doris Matsui (Incumbent)	97,008	72.7%
Republican	Joseph McCray Sr.	36,448	27.3%
Total votes		133,456	100.0%
Democratic hold			

=== 2016 ===
United States House of Representatives elections, 2016
Party	Candidate	Votes	%
Democratic	Doris Matsui (Incumbent)	177,565	75.4%
Republican	Robert Evans	57,848	24.6%
Total votes		235,413	100.0%
Democratic hold			

=== 2018 ===
2018 United States House of Representatives elections in California
Party	Candidate	Votes	%
Democratic	Doris Matsui (Incumbent)	162,411	80.4
Democratic	Jrmar Jefferson	39,528	19.6
Total votes		201,939	100.00
Democratic hold			

=== 2020 ===
2020 United States House of Representatives elections in California
Party	Candidate	Votes	%
Democratic	Doris Matsui (incumbent)	229,648	73.3
Republican	Chris Bish	83,466	26.7
Total votes		313,114	100.0
Democratic hold			

=== 2022 ===
2022 United States House of Representatives elections in California
Party	Candidate	Votes	%
Democratic	Ami Bera (incumbent)	121,058	55.9
Republican	Tamika Hamilton	95,325	44.1
Total votes		216,383	100.0
Democratic hold			

=== 2024 ===
2024 United States House of Representatives elections in California
Party	Candidate	Votes	%
Democratic	Ami Bera (incumbent)	165,408	57.6
Republican	Christine Bish	121,664	42.4
Total votes		287,072	100.0
Democratic hold			

== See also ==
- List of United States congressional districts
- California's congressional districts
