= Robert Condon =

American politician

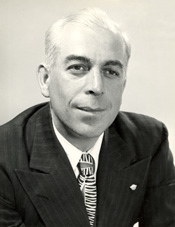

Member of the U.S. House of Representatives from California's 6th district
- In office January 3, 1953 – January 3, 1955
- Preceded by: George Paul Miller
- Succeeded by: John F. Baldwin, Jr.

Member of the California State Assembly from the 10th district
- In office January 3, 1949 - January 3, 1953
- Preceded by: George Miller Jr.
- Succeeded by: Donald D. Doyle

Personal details
- Born: November 10, 1912 Berkeley, California, U.S.
- Died: June 3, 1976 (aged 63) Walnut Creek, California, U.S.
- Party: Democratic Party
- Education: University of California at Berkeley; UC Berkeley School of Law

Military service
- Allegiance: United States
- Branch/service: United States Army
- Years of service: 1942-1946
- Rank: Staff Sergeant
- Battles/wars: World War II

Robert Likens Condon (November 10, 1912 – June 3, 1976) was a U.S. representative from California from 1953 to 1955. During World War II he served in the United States Army.

== Career ==
Born in Berkeley, California, Condon attended the public schools. He graduated from the University of California at Berkeley in 1934 and from the law college of the same university in 1938. He was editor in chief of the California Law Review in 1938 and was admitted to the California bar in the same year. Between 1938 and 1942 he served as attorney for the National Labor Relations Board. He also studied chemistry and physiology.

He served with the Office of Price Administration in 1942 as chief enforcement attorney for northern California and later as regional investigator for five Western States.

=== World War II ===
Condon entered the United States Army as a private in December 1942. He served overseas in the European Theater with Company G, Three Hundred and Tenth Infantry Regiment, Seventy-eighth Division, in France, Belgium, and Germany. He was discharged in February 1946 as a staff sergeant, having been decorated with two battle stars and the Silver Star.

=== California Assembly ===
He engaged in private practice of law in 1946 in Martinez, California and served as a member of the California State Assembly from 1948 to 1952.

=== Congress ===
Condon was elected as a Democrat to the Eighty-third Congress (January 3, 1953 – January 3, 1955). He was an unsuccessful candidate for reelection in 1954 to the Eighty-fourth Congress.

=== Later career and death ===
He resumed law practice in Martinez, California. After his death in Walnut Creek, California, on June 3, 1976 at age 63, Condon was cremated and his ashes were scattered at sea, three miles beyond the Golden Gate Bridge, San Francisco, California.

== Electoral history ==
1952 United States House of Representatives elections
Party	Candidate	Votes	%
Democratic	Robert Condon	87,768	50.6
Republican	John F. Baldwin Jr.	85,756	49.4
Total votes		173,524	100.0
Democratic win (new seat)			

1954 United States House of Representatives elections
Party	Candidate	Votes	%
Republican	John F. Baldwin Jr.	72,336	50.9
Democratic	Robert Condon (Incumbent)	69,776	49.1
Total votes		142,112	100.0
Republican gain from Democratic			

== Sources ==
- United States Congress. "Robert Condon (id: C000674)". Biographical Directory of the United States Congress.
- Join California Robert L. Condon

U.S. House of Representatives
Preceded by George P. Miller	Member of the U.S. House of Representatives from California's 6th congressional district 1953–1955	Succeeded by John F. Baldwin, Jr.
