= John F. Baldwin Jr. =

American politician (1915–1966)

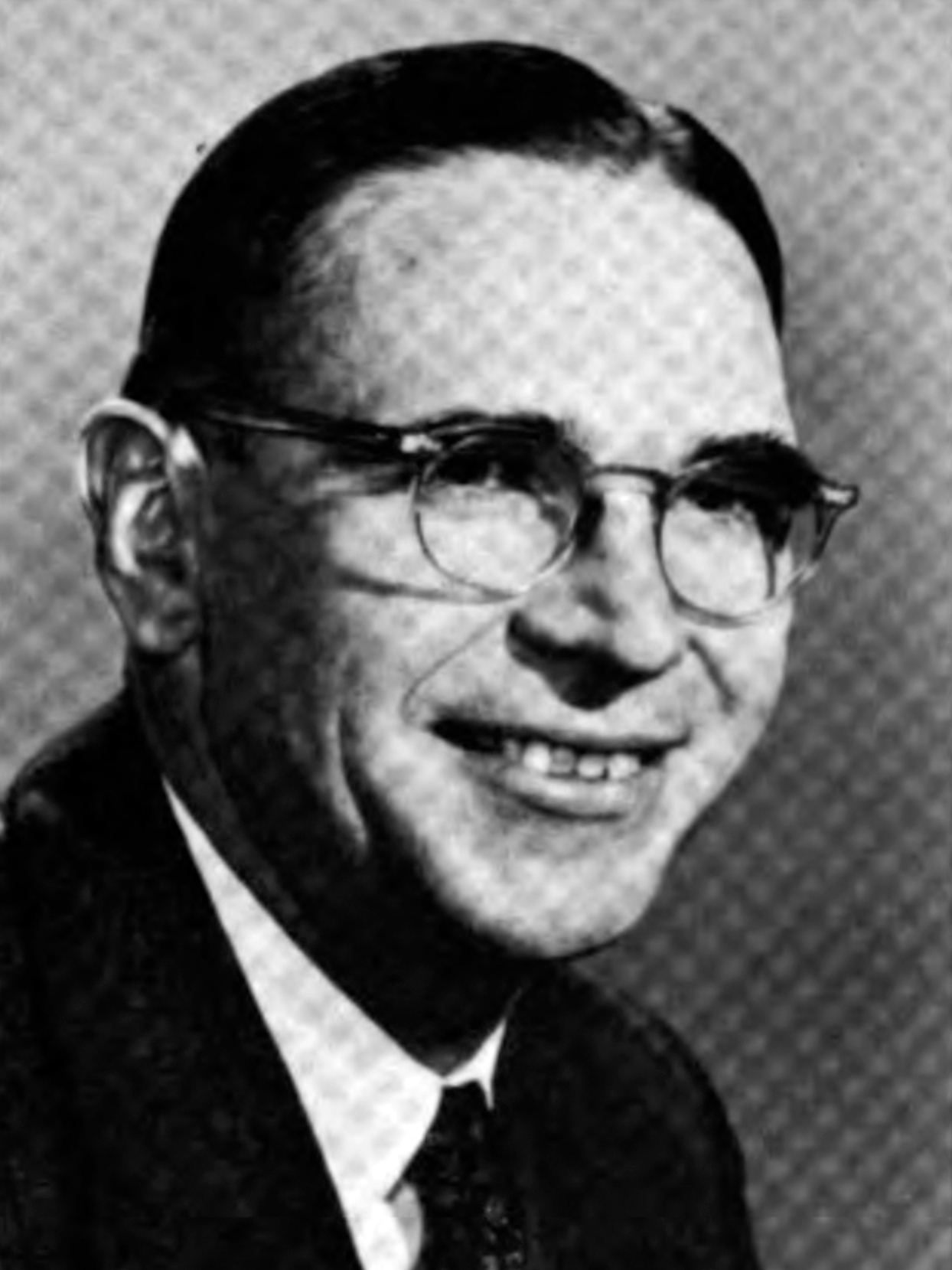
- Official portrait, 1967

Member of the U.S. House of Representatives from California
- In office January 3, 1955 – March 9, 1966
- Preceded by: Robert Condon
- Succeeded by: Jerome R. Waldie
- Constituency: 6th district (1955–1963); 14th district (1963–1966)

Personal details
- Born: John Finley Baldwin, Jr. June 28, 1915 Oakland, California, U.S.
- Died: March 9, 1966 (aged 50) Bethesda, Maryland, U.S.
- Resting place: Oakmont Memorial Park
- Party: Republican
- Spouse: Mary Isaacs Baldwin (m. 1944)
- Education: University of California at Berkeley, UC Berkeley School of Law

Military service
- Allegiance: United States of America
- Branch/service: United States Army
- Years of service: 1941–1946
- Rank: Lieutenant Colonel
- Battles/wars: World War II

John Finley Baldwin Jr. (June 28, 1915 – March 9, 1966) was an American lawyer, military officer, and liberal politician who served as a U.S. representative from California from 1955 to 1966.

== Early life ==
Born in Oakland, California, in 1915 to John Finley Baldwin and Nellie Linekin, John F. Baldwin Jr. graduated from San Ramon Valley High School in Danville, California. He went on to the University of California, Berkeley, where he majored in accounting and finance and graduated in 1935. Soon after he became the assistant manager of South-Western Publishing Co. in San Francisco.

Baldwin married Mary Isaacs at the Presidio of San Francisco in December 1944, while he was a major in the U.S. Army and she was a secretary.

== Career ==
Baldwin joined the U.S. Army in 1941 and served in the area of finance, first as a training director at the Army Finance School and later with the Office of Fiscal Director. By the time he was discharged in 1946, he had attained the rank of lieutenant colonel.

He returned to UC Berkeley to study law, graduating from its Boalt Hall School of Law in 1949.

=== Congress ===
Baldwin was elected to Congress as a Republican in 1954, was re-elected five times, and served from January 3, 1955, until his death from cancer at Bethesda Naval Hospital on March 9, 1966, aged 50.

He voted in favor of the Civil Rights Acts of 1957, 1960, and 1964, as well as the 24th Amendment to the U.S. Constitution and the Voting Rights Act of 1965.

== Electoral history ==
1952 United States House of Representatives elections
Party	Candidate	Votes	%
Democratic	Robert Condon	87,768	50.6
Republican	John F. Baldwin Jr.	85,756	49.4
Total votes		173,524	100.0
Democratic win (new seat)			

1954 United States House of Representatives elections
Party	Candidate	Votes	%
Republican	John F. Baldwin Jr.	72,336	50.9
Democratic	Robert Condon (Incumbent)	69,776	49.1
Total votes		142,112	100.0
Republican gain from Democratic			

1956 United States House of Representatives elections
Party	Candidate	Votes	%
Republican	John F. Baldwin Jr. (Incumbent)	98,683	53.7
Democratic	H. Roberts Quinney	84,965	46.3
Total votes		183,648	100.0
Republican hold			

1958 United States House of Representatives elections
Party	Candidate	Votes	%
Republican	John F. Baldwin Jr. (Incumbent)	92,669	51
Democratic	Howard H. Jewel	89,192	49
Total votes		181,861	100
Republican hold			

1960 United States House of Representatives elections
Party	Candidate	Votes	%
Republican	John F. Baldwin Jr. (Incumbent)	128,418	58.7
Democratic	Douglas R. Page	90,260	41.3
Total votes		218,678	100.0
Republican hold			

1962 United States House of Representatives elections
Party	Candidate	Votes	%
Republican	John F. Baldwin Jr. (Incumbent)	99,040	62.9
Democratic	Charles R. Weidner	58,469	37.1
Total votes		157,509	100.0
Turnout			
Republican hold			

1964 United States House of Representatives elections
Party	Candidate	Votes	%
Republican	John F. Baldwin Jr. (Incumbent)	117,272	64.9
Democratic	Russell M. Koch	63,469	35.1
Total votes		180,741	100.0
Turnout			
Republican hold			

== Legacy ==
- John F. Baldwin Elementary School, in Danville, was named after him. John F. Baldwin Park in Concord was also established to honor him.
- John F. Baldwin Shipping Channel is named after him.

== See also ==
- List of members of the United States Congress who died in office (1950–1999)

U.S. House of Representatives
Preceded by Robert Condon	Member of the U.S. House of Representatives from California's 6th congressional district 1955–1963	Succeeded by William S. Mailliard
Preceded by Harlan Hagen	Member of the U.S. House of Representatives from California's 14th congressional district 1963–1966	Succeeded by Jerome R. Waldie
