= Charles Milton Bell =

American photographer (1848–1893)

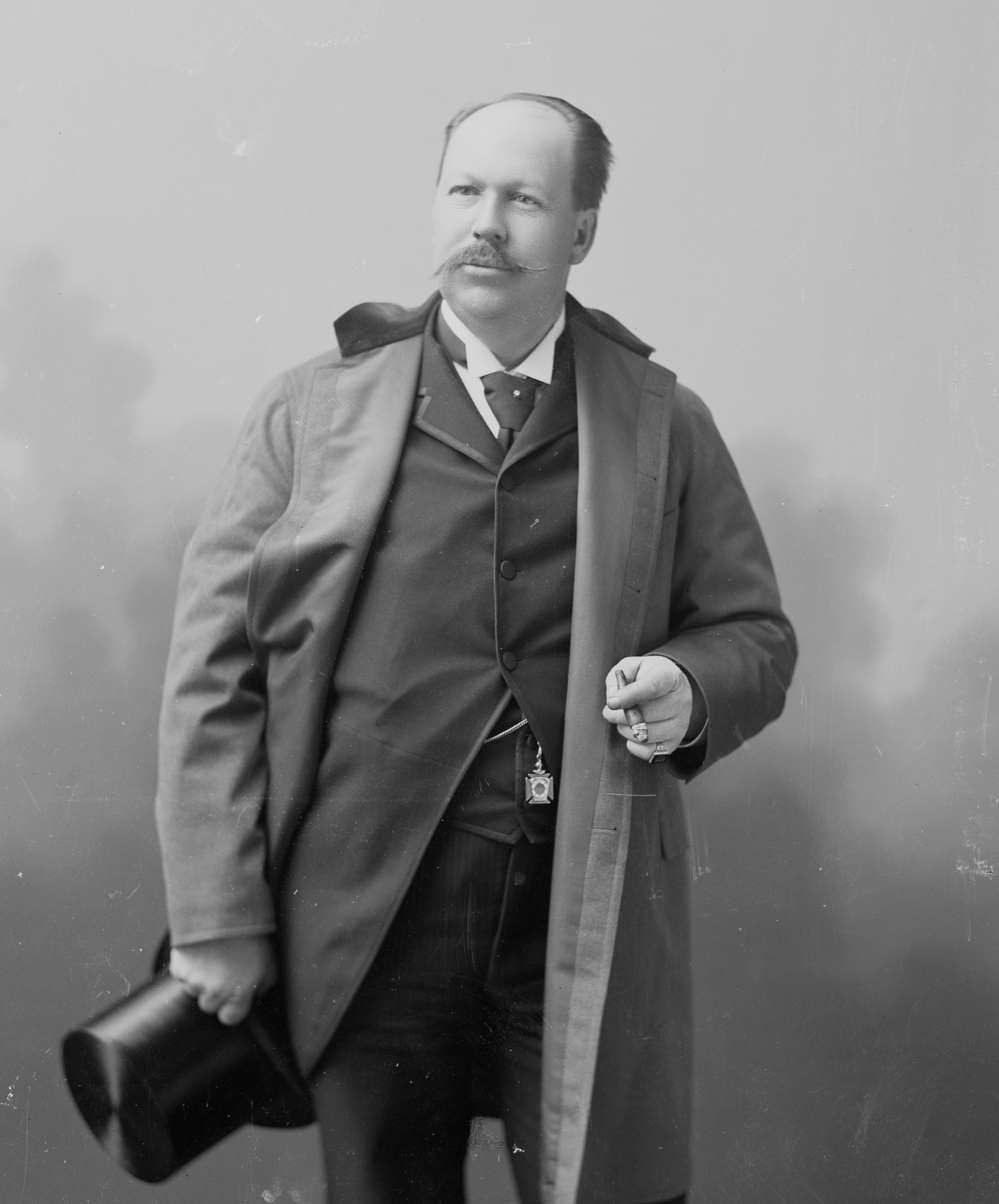
- Portrait of Bell from his own studio
- Born: 1848; Fredericksburg, Virginia, U.S.
- Died: May 12, 1893 (aged 44–45); Washington, D.C., U.S.
- Resting place: Oak Hill Cemetery; Washington, D.C., U.S. 38.913575, -77.058380
- Other name: C.M. Bell
- Known for: Photography
- Spouse: Annie E. Colley (m. 1880)
- Children: 2
- Website: cmbellstudio.com

Charles Milton Bell (1848 – May 12, 1893) was an American photographer who was noted for his portraits of Native Americans and other figures of the United States in the late 1800s. He was called "one of Washington's leading portrait photographers during the last quarter of the nineteenth century" by the Library of Congress.

== Early life ==
Charles Milton Bell was born in 1848 in Fredericksburg, Virginia, to Francis Hamilton Bell. He was the youngest member of a photographer family and his father was a gunsmith. In the late 1850s, the family moved from Fredericksburg to Washington, D.C.

Bell's family had a studio in Washington, D.C., from around 1860 to 1874. The firm was originally called the Turner and Company studio on Pennsylvania Avenue and was run by his brothers Thomas and Nephi. The studio was renamed to Bell & Brother in 1862. It was renamed briefly from 1866 to 1867 to Bell and Hall with the inclusion of their brother-in-law Allen F. Hall in the business. The firm made many carte de visites and stereograph views of Washington, D.C., and had a sales stand at the Smithsonian Institution.

== Career ==
Bell joined the family studio Bell & Brother in 1867. He left the studio and started his own studio on Pennsylvania Avenue, C. M. Bell, in 1873. Around 1874, the family closed their studio and his family would instead work in his studio. The studio expanded to four adjacent addresses on Pennsylvania Avenue. He also had an office on 15th Street. His studio became known for its portraits of notable people in Washington, D.C. He was a partner of the Bell Lithographic Company.

Bell worked with Ferdinand Vandeveer Hayden, who sent visiting Native Americans to Bell's studio to have their portraits made. Bell also made photographs of Native Americans for the Department of the Interior and the Bureau of American Ethnology, where he assisted in-house photographers.

== Personal life ==
Bell married Annie E. Colley, daughter of the owner of the Windsor Hotel in Washington, D.C., on November 17, 1880. They had two children, Charles Milton Jr. and Colley Wood.

Bell became ill while observing a naval review at Fort Monroe in Hampton, Virginia, in the spring of 1893. He died on May 12, 1893, at his home at Windsor Hotel in Washington, D.C. His funeral was held at Trinity Episcopal Church. He was buried at Oak Hill Cemetery in Washington, D.C.

== Legacy ==
After Bell's death, his wife continued to operate the studio with her sons. It was sold in the early 1900s to Atha and Cunningham who retained the original name. The negatives were sold to I. M. Boyce, who sold the Native American images to the Bureau of American Ethnology and most of the remainder to Alexander Graham Bell. From there they would end up owned by the American Genetic Association who donated them to the Library of Congress. The C. M. Bell Studio Collection held at the Library of Congress 30,000 glass negatives from 1873 to 1916 created by the studio and its successors.

== Example works ==
Year	Subject	Image	Dimensions	Collection	Comments
1879, January	Chief Yellow Bull of the Nez Perce			Hood Museum of Art, Dartmouth College, Hanover, New Hampshire	
1882	Chester A. Arthur (1829–1886), 21st president of the United States (1881–1885)		Film negative, B&W	Library of Congress, Washington, D.C.	Digital ID cph 3a53294
1886	Frances Cleveland (1864–1947), First Lady of the United States for two non-consecutive terms (1886–1889; 1893–1897)		Cropped from an albumen print cabinet card; Image has been restored	National Portrait Gallery, Washington, D.C.|NPG.2007.292	
1890–1893	Helen Adams Keller (1880–1968)			Fogg Museum, Harvard University, Cambridge, Massachusetts	Collodion print on card
1893	Omaha Chief		14 × 12 in. (35.6 × 30.5 cm.)	Smithsonian American Art Museum, Washington, D.C.	Albumen silver print
1888	Grover Cleveland (1837–1908), 22nd and 24th president of the United States (1885–1889; 1893–1897)			Prints and Photographs Division (1,085,783)	
