= Electoral history of Maxine Waters =

American political record

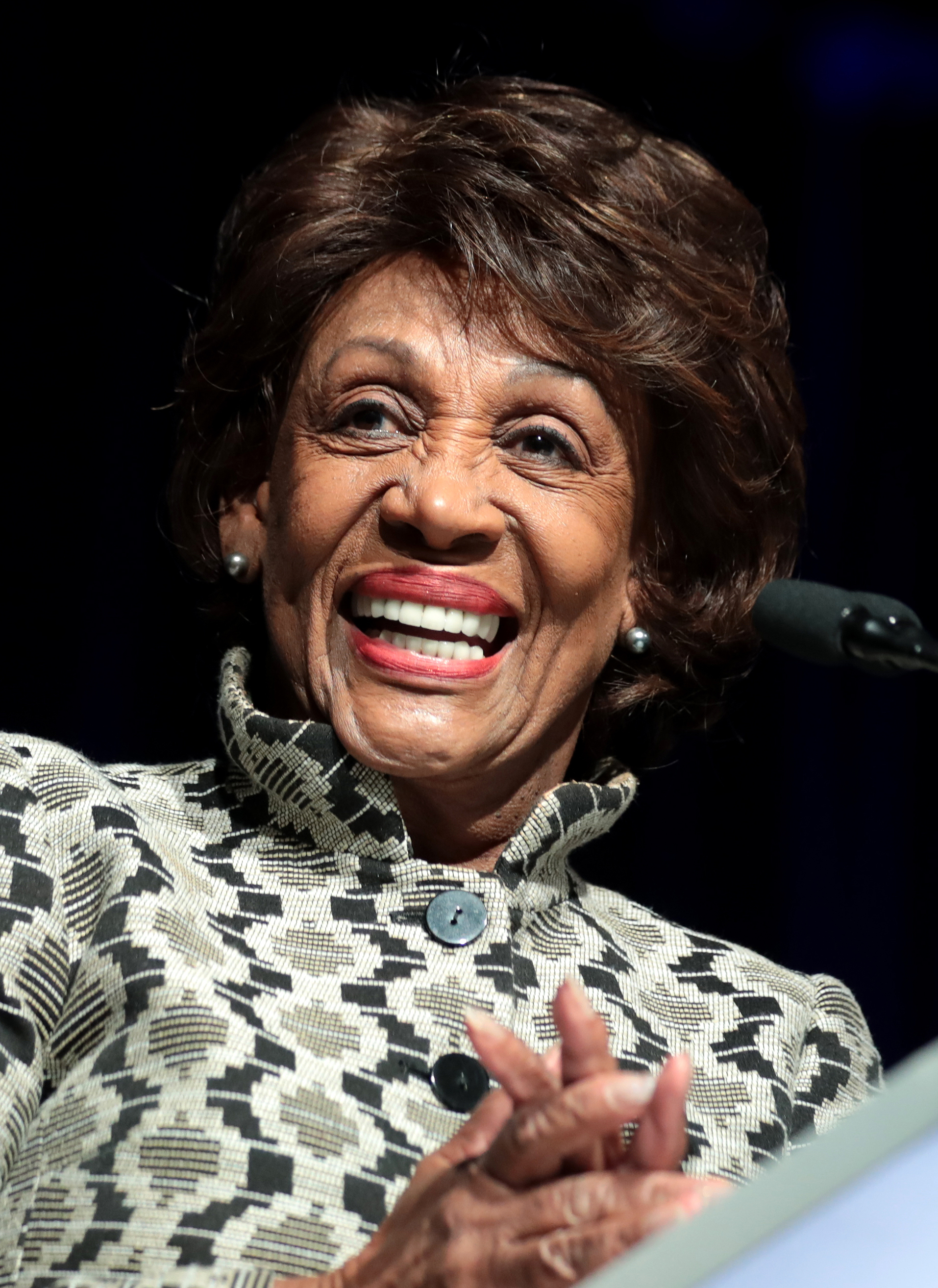
Waters in 2019.

Maxine Waters is an American politician from California who is currently serving in the U.S. House of Representatives since 1991. She represented the 29th district from 1991 to 1993, the 35th district from 1993 to 2013, and the 43rd district since 2013. Prior to her tenure in Congress, Waters represented the 48th district in the California State Assembly from 1976 to 1990.

== California State Assembly ==
1976 California State Assembly 48th district election
| Party | Candidate | Votes | % |
|---|---|---|---|
| Democratic | Maxine Waters | 38,133 | 80.6 |
| Republican | Johnnie G. Neely | 9,188 | 19.4 |
| Total votes | | 47,321 | 100.0 |
| Democratic hold | | | |

1978 California State Assembly 48th district election
| Party | Candidate | Votes | % |
|---|---|---|---|
| Democratic | Maxine Waters (incumbent) | 30,449 | 80.8 |
| Republican | Timothy F. Faulkner | 7,247 | 19.2 |
| Total votes | | 37,696 | 100.0 |
| Democratic hold | | | |

1980 California State Assembly 48th district election
| Party | Candidate | Votes | % |
|---|---|---|---|
| Democratic | Maxine Waters (incumbent) | 39,660 | 82.9 |
| Republican | Yva Hallburn | 8,194 | 17.1 |
| Total votes | | 47,854 | 100.0 |
| Democratic hold | | | |

1982 California State Assembly 48th district election
| Party | Candidate | Votes | % |
|---|---|---|---|
| Democratic | Maxine Waters (incumbent) | 54,209 | 100.0 |
| Total votes | | 54,209 | 100.0 |
| Democratic hold | | | |

1984 California State Assembly 48th district election
| Party | Candidate | Votes | % |
|---|---|---|---|
| Democratic | Maxine Waters (incumbent) | 59,507 | 85.8 |
| Republican | Donald "Don" Weiss | 9,884 | 14.2 |
| Total votes | | 69,391 | 100.0 |
| Democratic hold | | | |

1986 California State Assembly 48th district election
| Party | Candidate | Votes | % |
|---|---|---|---|
| Democratic | Maxine Waters (incumbent) | 42,706 | 84.5 |
| Republican | Ezola Foster | 6,450 | 12.8 |
| Libertarian | José "Joe" Castañeda | 1,360 | 2.7 |
| Total votes | | 50,516 | 100.0 |
| Democratic hold | | | |

1988 California State Assembly 48th district election
| Party | Candidate | Votes | % |
|---|---|---|---|
| Democratic | Maxine Waters (incumbent) | 49,946 | 100.0 |
| Total votes | | 49,946 | 100.0 |
| Democratic hold | | | |

== U.S. House of Representatives ==
=== 1990s ===
1990 California's 29th congressional district election
Primary election
| Party | Candidate | Votes | % |
|---|---|---|---|
| Democratic | Maxine Waters | 36,182 | 88.5 |
| Democratic | Lionel Allen | 2,666 | 6.5 |
| Democratic | Twain Wilson | 1,115 | 2.7 |
| Democratic | Ted Andromidas | 930 | 2.3 |
| Total votes | | 40,893 | 100 |
General election
| Democratic | Maxine Waters | 51,350 | 79.4 |
| Republican | Bill DeWitt | 12,054 | 18.6 |
| Libertarian | Waheed R. Boctor | 1,268 | 2.0 |
| Total votes | | 64,672 | 100.0 |
| Democratic hold | | | |

1992 California's 35th congressional district election
Primary election
| Party | Candidate | Votes | % |
|---|---|---|---|
| Democratic | Maxine Waters (incumbent) | 51,534 | 89.2 |
| Democratic | Roger A. Young | 6,252 | 10.8 |
| Total votes | | 57,786 | 100.0 |
General election
| Democratic | Maxine Waters (incumbent) | 102,941 | 82.5 |
| Republican | Nate Truman | 17,417 | 14.0 |
| Peace and Freedom | Alice Mae Miles | 2,797 | 2.2 |
| Libertarian | Carin Rogers | 1,618 | 1.3 |
| No party | Gordan Michael Mego (write-in) | 3 | 0.0 |
| Total votes | | 124,776 | 100.0 |
| Democratic gain from Republican | | | |

1994 California's 35th congressional district election
Primary election
| Party | Candidate | Votes | % |
|---|---|---|---|
| Democratic | Maxine Waters (incumbent) | 31,813 | 100.0 |
| Total votes | | 31,813 | 100.0 |
General election
| Democratic | Maxine Waters (incumbent) | 65,688 | 78.1 |
| Republican | Nate Truman | 18,390 | 21.9 |
| No party | Gordan Michael Mego (write-in) | 3 | 0.0 |
| Total votes | | 84,081 | 100.0 |
| Democratic hold | | | |

1996 California's 35th congressional district election
Primary election
| Party | Candidate | Votes | % |
|---|---|---|---|
| Democratic | Maxine Waters (incumbent) | 41,993 | 100.0 |
| Total votes | | 41,993 | 100.0 |
General election
| Democratic | Maxine Waters (incumbent) | 92,762 | 85.5 |
| Republican | Eric Carlson | 13,116 | 12.1 |
| American Independent | Gordan Michael Mego | 2,610 | 2.4 |
| Total votes | | 108,398 | 100.0 |
| Democratic hold | | | |

1998 California's 35th congressional district election
Primary election
| Party | Candidate | Votes | % |
|---|---|---|---|
| Democratic | Maxine Waters (incumbent) | 48,892 | 100.0 |
| Total votes | | 48,892 | 100.0 |
General election
| Democratic | Maxine Waters (incumbent) | 78,732 | 89.3 |
| American Independent | Gordan Michael Mego | 9,413 | 10.7 |
| Total votes | | 88,145 | 100.0 |
| Democratic hold | | | |

=== 2000s ===
2000 California's 35th congressional district election
Primary election
| Party | Candidate | Votes | % |
|---|---|---|---|
| Democratic | Maxine Waters (incumbent) | 64,176 | 100.0 |
| Total votes | | 64,176 | 100.0 |
General election
| Democratic | Maxine Waters (incumbent) | 100,569 | 86.5 |
| Republican | Carl McGill | 12,582 | 10.8 |
| American Independent | Gordan Michael Mego | 1,911 | 1.6 |
| Natural Law | Rick Dunstan | 1,153 | 1.0 |
| Total votes | | 116,215 | 100.0 |
| Democratic hold | | | |

2002 California's 35th congressional district election
Primary election
| Party | Candidate | Votes | % |
|---|---|---|---|
| Democratic | Maxine Waters (incumbent) | 36,351 | 100.0 |
| Total votes | | 36,351 | 100.0 |
General election
| Democratic | Maxine Waters (incumbent) | 72,401 | 77.5 |
| Republican | Ross Moen | 18,094 | 19.4 |
| American Independent | Gordan Michael Mego | 2,912 | 3.1 |
| Total votes | | 93,407 | 100.0 |
| Democratic hold | | | |

2004 California's 35th congressional district election
Primary election
| Party | Candidate | Votes | % |
|---|---|---|---|
| Democratic | Maxine Waters (incumbent) | 41,452 | 100.0 |
| Total votes | | 41,452 | 100.0 |
General election
| Democratic | Maxine Waters (incumbent) | 125,949 | 80.5 |
| Republican | Ross Moen | 23,591 | 15.1 |
| American Independent | Gordan Michael Mego | 3,440 | 2.2 |
| Libertarian | Charles Tate | 3,427 | 2.2 |
| Total votes | | 156,407 | 100.0 |
| Democratic hold | | | |

2006 California's 35th congressional district election
Primary election
| Party | Candidate | Votes | % |
|---|---|---|---|
| Democratic | Maxine Waters (incumbent) | 34,338 | 86.1 |
| Democratic | Carl McGill | 5,538 | 13.9 |
| Total votes | | 39,876 | 100.0 |
General election
| Democratic | Maxine Waters (incumbent) | 82,498 | 83.8 |
| American Independent | Gordan Mego | 8,343 | 8.5 |
| Libertarian | Paul Ireland | 7,665 | 7.8 |
| Total votes | | 98,506 | 100.0 |
| Democratic hold | | | |

2008 California's 35th congressional district election
Primary election
| Party | Candidate | Votes | % |
|---|---|---|---|
| Democratic | Maxine Waters (incumbent) | 36,685 | 100.0 |
| Total votes | | 36,685 | 100.0 |
General election
| Democratic | Maxine Waters (incumbent) | 150,778 | 82.6 |
| Republican | Theodore Hayes Jr. | 24,169 | 13.2 |
| Libertarian | Herbert G. Peters | 7,632 | 4.2 |
| Total votes | | 182,579 | 100.0 |
| Democratic hold | | | |

=== 2010s ===
2010 California's 35th congressional district election
Primary election
| Party | Candidate | Votes | % |
|---|---|---|---|
| Democratic | Maxine Waters (incumbent) | 32,946 | 100.0 |
| Total votes | | 32,946 | 100.0 |
General election
| Democratic | Maxine Waters (incumbent) | 98,131 | 79.3 |
| Republican | K. Bruce Brown | 25,561 | 20.7 |
| Democratic | Suleiman Charles Edmondson (write-in) | 2 | 0.0 |
| Total votes | | 123,694 | 100.0 |
| Democratic hold | | | |

2012 California's 43rd congressional district election
Primary election
| Party | Candidate | Votes | % |
|---|---|---|---|
| Democratic | Maxine Waters (incumbent) | 36,062 | 65.4 |
| Democratic | Bob Flores | 19,061 | 34.5 |
| Total votes | | 55,123 | 100.0 |
General election
| Democratic | Maxine Waters (incumbent) | 143,123 | 71.2 |
| Democratic | Bob Flores | 57,771 | 28.8 |
| Total votes | | 200,894 | 100.0 |
| Democratic hold | | | |

2014 California's 43rd congressional district election
Primary election
| Party | Candidate | Votes | % |
|---|---|---|---|
| Democratic | Maxine Waters (incumbent) | 33,746 | 67.2 |
| Republican | John Wood Jr. | 16,440 | 32.8 |
| American Independent | Brandon M. Cook (write-in) | 12 | 0.0 |
| Total votes | | 50,198 | 100.0 |
General election
| Democratic | Maxine Waters (incumbent) | 69,681 | 71.0 |
| Republican | John Wood Jr. | 28,521 | 29.0 |
| Total votes | | 99,202 | 100.0 |
| Democratic hold | | | |

2016 California's 43rd congressional district election
Primary election
| Party | Candidate | Votes | % |
|---|---|---|---|
| Democratic | Maxine Waters (incumbent) | 92,909 | 76.1 |
| Republican | Omar Navarro | 29,152 | 23.9 |
| Total votes | | 122,061 | 100.0 |
General election
| Democratic | Maxine Waters (incumbent) | 167,017 | 76.1 |
| Republican | Omar Navarro | 52,499 | 23.9 |
| Total votes | | 219,516 | 100.0 |
| Democratic hold | | | |

2018 California's 43rd congressional district election
Primary election
| Party | Candidate | Votes | % |
|---|---|---|---|
| Democratic | Maxine Waters (incumbent) | 63,908 | 72.4 |
| Republican | Omar Navarro | 12,522 | 14.1 |
| Republican | Frank T. DeMartini | 6,156 | 7.0 |
| Republican | Edwin P. Duterte | 3,673 | 4.3 |
| Green | Miguel Angel Zuniga | 2,074 | 2.4 |
| Total votes | | 88,333 | 100.0 |
General election
| Democratic | Maxine Waters (incumbent) | 152,272 | 77.7 |
| Republican | Omar Navarro | 43,780 | 22.3 |
| Total votes | | 196,052 | 100.0 |
| Democratic hold | | | |

=== 2020s ===
2020 California's 43rd congressional district election
Primary election
| Party | Candidate | Votes | % |
|---|---|---|---|
| Democratic | Maxine Waters (incumbent) | 100,468 | 78.1 |
| Republican | Joe Edward Collins III | 14,189 | 11.0 |
| Republican | Omar Navarro | 13,939 | 10.8 |
| Total votes | | 128,596 | 100.0 |
General election
| Democratic | Maxine Waters (incumbent) | 199,210 | 71.7 |
| Republican | Joe Edward Collins III | 78,688 | 28.3 |
| Total votes | | 277,898 | 100.0 |
| Democratic hold | | | |

2022 California's 43rd congressional district election
Primary election
| Party | Candidate | Votes | % |
|---|---|---|---|
| Democratic | Maxine Waters (incumbent) | 55,889 | 74.3 |
| Republican | Omar Navarro | 8,927 | 11.9 |
| Republican | Allison Pratt | 5,489 | 7.3 |
| Democratic | Jean Monestime | 4,952 | 6.6 |
| Total votes | | 75,257 | 100.0 |
General election
| Democratic | Maxine Waters (incumbent) | 95,462 | 77.3 |
| Republican | Omar Navarro | 27,985 | 22.7 |
| Total votes | | 123,447 | 100.0 |
| Democratic hold | | | |

2024 California's 43rd congressional district election
Primary election
| Party | Candidate | Votes | % |
|---|---|---|---|
| Democratic | Maxine Waters (incumbent) | 54,673 | 69.8 |
| Republican | Steve Williams | 10,896 | 13.9 |
| Republican | David Knight | 5,647 | 7.2 |
| Democratic | Chris Wiggins | 4,999 | 6.4 |
| Democratic | Gregory Cheadle | 2,075 | 2.7 |
| Total votes | | 78,290 | 100.0 |
General election
| Democratic | Maxine Waters (incumbent) | 160,080 | 75.1 |
| Republican | Steve Williams | 53,152 | 24.9 |
| Total votes | | 213,232 | 100.0 |
| Democratic hold | | | |

2026 California's 43rd congressional district election
Primary election
| Party | Candidate | Votes | % |
|---|---|---|---|
| Democratic | Maxine Waters (incumbent) | 75,693 | 63.8 |
| Republican | Cristian Morales | 20,009 | 16.9 |
| Democratic | Myla Rahman | 17,847 | 15.0 |
| Democratic | David Sedlik | 5,102 | 4.3 |
| Total votes | | 118,651 | 100.0 |
