= Omar Navarro (disambiguation) =

Omar Navarro (born 1989) is as a perennial candidate in California's 43rd congressional district.

Omar Navarro may also refer to:

- Gran Omar or Omar Jose Navarro, Puerto Rican reggaeton musician
- Omar Navarro, a recurring character on Ozark
