= 1998 United States House of Representatives elections in California =

- November 3, 1998

All 52 California seats to the United States House of Representatives
	Majority party	Minority party
Party	Democratic	Republican
Last election	29	23
Seats won	28	24
Seat change	▼1	▲1
Popular vote	4,131,092	3,527,244
Percentage	51.41%	43.90%
- Results: Democratic hold Democratic gain Republican hold Republican gain

The United States House of Representatives elections in California, 1998 was an election for California's delegation to the United States House of Representatives, which occurred as part of the general election of the House of Representatives on November 3, 1998. Democrats gained the 1st district but lost the 3rd and 36th (which they would gain back in 2000) districts for a net loss of one seat.

This was the last time until a special election in 2020 where a Republican flipped a Democratic-held U.S. House seat in California, and also the last time until 2020 that Republicans flipped a Democratic-held seat in a general election.

== Overview ==
United States House of Representatives elections in California, 1998
Party	Votes	%	Before	After	+/–
Democratic	4,131,092	51.41%	29	28	-1
Republican	3,527,244	43.90%	23	24	+1
Libertarian	202,542	2.52%	0	0	0
Natural Law	113,601	1.41%	0	0	0
Green	23,906	0.30%	0	0	0
American Independent	14,587	0.18%	0	0	0
Peace and Freedom	14,070	0.18%	0	0	0
Reform	7,628	0.09%	0	0	0
Write-ins	793	0.01%	0	0	0
Invalid or blank votes	628,189	7.25%	—	—	—
Totals	8,662,859	100.00%	52	52	—

== Separate elections ==
Three special elections were held apart from those in November. The elected winners would serve the remainder of the incumbent Congress and face re-election in November.

Date	District	Reason & Result	Candidates
March 10, 1998	California 22	Walter Capps (D) died October 28, 1997; Democratic hold Winner was subsequently re-elected in November	Lois Capps (D); Tom Bordonaro (R); Robert Bakhaus (L)
April 7, 1998	California 9	Ron Dellums (D) resigned February 6, 1998; Democratic hold Winner was subsequently re-elected in November	Barbara Lee (D); Greg Harper (D); Claiborne Sanders (R); Randal Stewart (D)
April 7, 1998	California 44	Sonny Bono (R) died January 5, 1998; Republican hold Winner was subsequently re-elected in November	Mary Bono (R); Ralph Waite (D); Anna Nevenich (D); John W. J. Overman (D); Tom Hamey (R); Bud Mathewson (R)

== Results ==
Final results from the Secretary of State of California:

=== District 1 ===
California's 1st congressional district election, 1998
Party	Candidate	Votes	%
Democratic	Mike Thompson	121,713	61.85
Republican	Mark Luce	64,622	32.84
Libertarian	Emil Rossi	5,404	2.75
Peace and Freedom	Ernest K. Jones, Jr.	4,996	2.54
No party	Lawrence R. Weisner (write-in)	37	0.02
Invalid or blank votes		11,017	5.30
Total votes		207,789	100.00
Turnout			
Democratic gain from Republican			

=== District 2 ===
California's 2nd congressional district election, 1998
Party	Candidate	Votes	%
Republican	Wally Herger (incumbent)	128,372	62.51
Democratic	Roberts "Rob" Braden	70,837	34.49
Natural Law	Patrice Thiessen	6,138	2.99
No party	Stephen F. Scott (write-in)	20	0.01
Invalid or blank votes		10,185	4.73
Total votes		215,552	100.00
Turnout			
Republican hold			

=== District 3 ===
California's 3rd congressional district election, 1998
Party	Candidate	Votes	%
Republican	Doug Ose	100,621	52.41
Democratic	Sandie Dunn	86,471	45.04
Libertarian	Ross Crain	4,914	2.56
Invalid or blank votes		12,040	5.90
Total votes		204,046	100.00
Turnout			
Republican gain from Democratic			

=== District 4 ===
California's 4th congressional district election, 1998
Party	Candidate	Votes	%
Republican	John Doolittle (incumbent)	155,306	62.57
Democratic	David Shapiro	85,394	34.40
Libertarian	Dan Winterrowd	7,524	3.03
Invalid or blank votes		15,715	5.95
Total votes		263,939	100.00
Turnout			
Republican hold			

=== District 5 ===
California's 5th congressional district election, 1998
Party	Candidate	Votes	%
Democratic	Robert Matsui (incumbent)	130,715	71.89
Republican	Robert Dinsmore	47,307	26.02
Libertarian	Douglas Arthur Tuma	3,746	2.06
No party	Ken Adams (write-in)	70	0.04
Invalid or blank votes		9,856	5.14
Total votes		191,694	100.00
Turnout			
Democratic hold			

=== District 6 ===
California's 6th congressional district election, 1998
Party	Candidate	Votes	%
Democratic	Lynn Woolsey (incumbent)	158,446	68.01
Republican	Ken McAuliffe	69,295	29.74
Natural Law	Alan R. Barreca	5,240	2.25
Invalid or blank votes		10,861	4.45
Total votes		243,842	100.00
Turnout			
Democratic hold			

=== District 7 ===
California's 7th congressional district election, 1998
Party	Candidate	Votes	%
Democratic	George Miller (incumbent)	125,842	76.67
Republican	Norman H. Reece	38,290	23.33
Invalid or blank votes		10,178	5.84
Total votes		174,310	100.00
Turnout			
Democratic hold			

=== District 8 ===
California's 8th congressional district election, 1998
Party	Candidate	Votes	%
Democratic	Nancy Pelosi (incumbent)	148,027	85.83
Republican	David J. Martz	20,781	12.05
Natural Law	David Smithstein	3,654	2.12
Invalid or blank votes		20,405	10.58
Total votes		195,996	100.00
Turnout			
Democratic hold			

=== District 9 ===
California's 9th congressional district election, 1998
Party	Candidate	Votes	%
Democratic	Barbara Lee (incumbent)	140,722	82.83
Republican	Claiborne "Clay" Sanders	22,431	13.20
Peace and Freedom	Gerald Sanders	4,767	2.81
Natural Law	Walter Ruehlig	1,975	1.16
Invalid or blank votes		14,602	7.91
Total votes		184,497	100.00
Turnout			
Democratic hold			

=== District 10 ===
California's 10th congressional district election, 1998
Party	Candidate	Votes	%
Democratic	Ellen Tauscher (incumbent)	127,134	53.46
Republican	Charles Ball	103,299	43.44
Natural Law	Valerie Janlois	3,941	1.66
Reform	John Place	3,435	1.44
Invalid or blank votes		12,418	4.96
Total votes		250,227	100.00
Turnout			
Democratic hold			

=== District 11 ===
California's 11th congressional district election, 1998
Party	Candidate	Votes	%
Republican	Richard Pombo (incumbent)	95,496	61.43
Democratic	Robert L. Figueroa	56,345	36.25
Libertarian	Jesse Baird	3,608	2.32
Invalid or blank votes		12,653	7.53
Total votes		168,102	100.00
Turnout			
Republican hold			

=== District 12 ===
California's 12th congressional district election, 1998
Party	Candidate	Votes	%
Democratic	Tom Lantos (incumbent)	128,135	73.98
Republican	Robert H. Evans, Jr.	36,562	21.11
Libertarian	Michael J. Moloney	8,515	4.92
Invalid or blank votes		14,592	7.77
Total votes		187,804	100.00
Turnout			
Democratic hold			

=== District 13 ===
California's 13th congressional district election, 1998
Party	Candidate	Votes	%
Democratic	Pete Stark (incumbent)	101,671	71.20
Republican	James R. Goetz	38,050	26.65
Natural Law	Karnig Beylikjian	3,066	2.15
Invalid or blank votes		11,847	7.66
Total votes		154,634	100.00
Turnout			
Democratic hold			

=== District 14 ===
California's 14th congressional district election, 1998
Party	Candidate	Votes	%
Democratic	Anna Eshoo (incumbent)	129,663	68.64
Republican	John C. "Chris" Haugen	53,719	28.44
Libertarian	Joseph W. Dehn III	3,166	1.68
Natural Law	Anna Currivan	2,362	1.25
Invalid or blank votes		9,744	4.91
Total votes		198,654	100.00
Turnout			
Democratic hold			

=== District 15 ===
California's 15th congressional district election, 1998
Party	Candidate	Votes	%
Republican	Tom Campbell (incumbent)	111,876	60.54
Democratic	Dick Lane	70,059	37.91
Natural Law	Frank Strutner	2,843	1.54
No party	Constant Vlakancic (write-in)	8	0.00
Invalid or blank votes		12,654	6.41
Total votes		197,440	100.00
Turnout			
Republican hold			

=== District 16 ===
California's 16th congressional district election, 1998
Party	Candidate	Votes	%
Democratic	Zoe Lofgren (incumbent)	85,503	72.82
Republican	Horace Eugene Thayn	27,494	23.42
Natural Law	John H. Black	4,417	3.76
Invalid or blank votes		8,511	6.76
Total votes		125,925	100.00
Turnout			
Democratic hold			

=== District 17 ===
California's 17th congressional district election, 1998
Party	Candidate	Votes	%
Democratic	Sam Farr (incumbent)	103,719	64.55
Republican	Bill McCampbell	52,470	32.65
Libertarian	Rick Garrett	2,791	1.74
Natural Law	Scott R. Hartley	1,710	1.06
Invalid or blank votes		9,020	5.31
Total votes		169,710	100.00
Turnout			
Democratic hold			

=== District 18 ===
California's 18th congressional district election, 1998
Party	Candidate	Votes	%
Democratic	Gary Condit (incumbent)	118,842	86.79
Libertarian	Linda M. Degroat	18,089	13.21
Invalid or blank votes		10,790	7.30
Total votes		147,721	100.00
Turnout			
Democratic hold			

=== District 19 ===
California's 19th congressional district election, 1998
Party	Candidate	Votes	%
Republican	George Radanovich (incumbent)	131,105	79.4
Libertarian	Jonathan Richter	34,044	20.6
Invalid or blank votes		18,249	9.95
Total votes		183,398	100.00
Turnout			
Republican hold			

=== District 20 ===
California's 20th congressional district election, 1998
Party	Candidate	Votes	%
Democratic	Cal Dooley (incumbent)	60,599	60.73
Republican	Cliff Unruh	39,183	39.27
Invalid or blank votes		6,181	5.83
Total votes		105,963	100.00
Turnout			
Democratic hold			

=== District 21 ===
California's 21st congressional district election, 1998
Party	Candidate	Votes	%
Republican	Bill Thomas (incumbent)	115,989	78.91
Reform	John Evans	30,994	21.09
Invalid or blank votes		14,516	8.99
Total votes		161,499	100.00
Turnout			
Republican hold			

=== District 22 ===
California's 22nd congressional district election, 1998
Party	Candidate	Votes	%
Democratic	Lois Capps (incumbent)	111,388	55.09
Republican	Tom J. Bordonaro Jr.	86,921	42.99
Libertarian	Robert Bakhaus	2,618	1.29
Reform	Richard D. "Dick" Porter	1,263	0.62
Invalid or blank votes		6,575	3.15
Total votes		208,765	100.00
Turnout			
Democratic hold			

=== District 23 ===
California's 23rd congressional district election, 1998
Party	Candidate	Votes	%
Republican	Elton Gallegly (incumbent)	96,362	60.06
Democratic	Daniel "Dan" Gonzalez	64,068	39.94
Invalid or blank votes		10,739	6.27
Total votes		171,169	100.00
Turnout			
Republican hold			

=== District 24 ===
==== Polling ====
Poll source	Date(s)	Sample size	Margin of error	Brad Sherman (D)	Randy Hoffman (R)	Other / undecided (Note: Calculated by taking the difference of 100% and all other candidates combined.)
Zogby Interactive/JZ Analytics	October 25, 1998	300	—	47%	34%	19%

==== Results ====
California's 24th congressional district election, 1998
Party	Candidate	Votes	%
Democratic	Brad Sherman (incumbent)	103,491	57.31
Republican	Randy Hoffman	69,501	38.49
Natural Law	Catherine Carter	3,033	1.68
Libertarian	Erich D. Miller	2,695	1.49
Peace and Freedom	Ralph Shroyer	1,860	1.03
Invalid or blank votes		11,710	6.09
Total votes		192,290	100.00
Turnout			
Democratic hold			

=== District 25 ===
California's 25th congressional district election, 1998
Party	Candidate	Votes	%
Republican	Howard McKeon (incumbent)	114,013	74.67
Libertarian	Bruce Acker	38,669	25.33
Invalid or blank votes		19,092	11.11
Total votes		171,774	100.00
Turnout			
Republican hold			

=== District 26 ===
California's 26th congressional district election, 1998
Party	Candidate	Votes	%
Democratic	Howard Berman (incumbent)	69,000	82.47
Libertarian	Juan Carlos Ros	6,556	7.84
Green	Maria Armoudian	4,858	5.81
Natural Law	David L. Cossak	3,248	3.88
Invalid or blank votes		9,803	10.49
Total votes		93,465	100.00
Turnout			
Democratic hold			

=== District 27 ===
California's 27th congressional district election, 1998
Party	Candidate	Votes	%
Republican	Jim Rogan (incumbent)	80,702	50.73
Democratic	Barry A. Gordon	73,875	46.44
Libertarian	Bob New	4,489	2.82
Invalid or blank votes		10,853	6.39
Total votes		169,919	100.00
Turnout			
Republican hold			

=== District 28 ===
California's 28th congressional district election, 1998
Party	Candidate	Votes	%
Republican	David Dreier (incumbent)	90,607	57.64
Democratic	Janice M. Nelson	61,721	39.26
Libertarian	Jerry R. Douglas	2,099	1.34
Green	Walt Contreras Sheasby	1,954	1.24
Natural Law	M. Lawrence Allison	819	0.52
Invalid or blank votes		10,620	6.33
Total votes		167,820	100.00
Turnout			
Republican hold			

=== District 29 ===
California's 29th congressional district election, 1998
Party	Candidate	Votes	%
Democratic	Henry Waxman (incumbent)	131,561	73.87
Republican	Mike Gottlieb	40,282	22.62
Libertarian	Mike Binkley	3,534	1.98
Natural Law	Karen Blasdell-Wilkinson	2,717	1.53
Invalid or blank votes		11,809	6.22
Total votes		189,903	100.00
Turnout			
Democratic hold			

=== District 30 ===
California's 30th congressional district election, 1998
Party	Candidate	Votes	%
Democratic	Xavier Becerra (incumbent)	58,230	81.25
Republican	Patricia Parker	13,441	18.75
Invalid or blank votes		6,325	8.11
Total votes		77,996	100.00
Turnout			
Democratic hold			

=== District 31 ===
California's 31st congressional district election, 1998
Party	Candidate	Votes	%
Democratic	Matthew G. Martinez (incumbent)	61,173	70.02
Republican	Frank C. Moreno	19,786	22.65
Green	Krista Lieberg-Wong	4,377	5.01
Libertarian	Michael B. Everling	1,121	1.28
Natural Law	Gary Hearne	903	1.03
Invalid or blank votes		7,683	8.08
Total votes		95,043	100.00
Turnout			
Democratic hold			

=== District 32 ===
California's 32nd congressional district election, 1998
Party	Candidate	Votes	%
Democratic	Julian C. Dixon (incumbent)	112,253	86.69
Republican	Laurence Ardito	14,622	11.29
Libertarian	Velko Milosevich	2,617	2.02
Invalid or blank votes		11,836	8.37
Total votes		141,328	100.00
Turnout			
Democratic hold			

=== District 33 ===
California's 33rd congressional district election, 1998
Party	Candidate	Votes	%
Democratic	Lucille Roybal-Allard (incumbent)	43,310	87.19
Republican	Wayne Miller	6,364	12.81
Invalid or blank votes		4,996	9.14
Total votes		54,670	100.00
Turnout			
Democratic hold			

=== District 34 ===
California's 34th congressional district election, 1998
Party	Candidate	Votes	%
Democratic	Grace Napolitano	76,471	67.63
Republican	Ed Perez	32,321	28.58
Libertarian	Jason Heath	2,195	1.94
American Independent	Walter Scott	2,088	1.85
Invalid or blank votes		9,381	7.66
Total votes		122,456	100.00
Turnout			
Democratic hold			

=== District 35 ===
California's 35th congressional district election, 1998
Party	Candidate	Votes	%
Democratic	Maxine Waters (incumbent)	78,732	89.32
American Independent	Gordon Michael Mego	9,413	10.68
Invalid or blank votes		9,079	9.34
Total votes		117,567	100.00
Turnout			
Democratic hold			

=== District 36 ===
==== Polling ====
Poll source	Date(s)	Sample size	Margin of error	Steve Kuykendall (R)	Janice Hahn (D)	Other / undecided
Zogby Interactive/JZ Analytics	October 25, 1998	300	—	47%	30%	23%

==== Results ====
California's 36th congressional district election, 1998
Party	Candidate	Votes	%
Republican	Steven T. Kuykendall	88,843	48.89
Democratic	Janice Hahn	84,624	46.57
Green	Robin Barrett	3,612	1.99
Libertarian	Kerry Welsh	3,066	1.69
Reform	John R. Konopka	1,561	0.86
Invalid or blank votes		13,140	6.74
Total votes		194,846	100.00
Turnout			
Republican gain from Democratic			

=== District 37 ===
California's 37th congressional district election, 1998
Party	Candidate	Votes	%
Democratic	Juanita Millender-McDonald (inc.)	70,026	85.06
Republican	Saul E. Lankster	12,301	14.94
Invalid or blank votes		11,036	11.82
Total votes		93,363	100.00
Turnout			
Democratic hold			

=== District 38 ===
California's 38th congressional district election, 1998
Party	Candidate	Votes	%
Republican	Steve Horn (incumbent)	88,136	52.93
Democratic	Peter Mathews	71,627	44.31
Libertarian	David Bowers	3,705	2.75
No party	Margherita Underhill (write-in)	17	0.01
Invalid or blank votes		10,085	6.96
Total votes		173,570	100.00
Turnout			
Republican hold			

=== District 39 ===
California's 39th congressional district election, 1998
Party	Candidate	Votes	%
Republican	Ed Royce (incumbent)	97,366	62.63
Democratic	A. "Cecy" R. Groom	52,815	33.97
Libertarian	Jack Dean	3,347	2.15
Natural Law	Ron Jevning	1,937	1.25
Invalid or blank votes		12,719	7.56
Total votes		168,184	100.00
Turnout			
Republican hold			

=== District 40 ===
California's 40th congressional district election, 1998
Party	Candidate	Votes	%
Republican	Jerry Lewis (incumbent)	97,406	64.88
Democratic	Robert "Bob" Conaway	47,897	31.90
Libertarian	Maurice Maybena	4,822	3.21
Invalid or blank votes		10,135	6.32
Total votes		160,260	100.00
Turnout			
Republican hold			

=== District 41 ===
California's 41st congressional district election, 1998
Party	Candidate	Votes	%
Republican	Gary Miller	68,310	53.20
Democratic	Eileen R. Ansari	52,264	40.70
Green	Cynthia Allaire	3,597	2.80
Libertarian	Kenneth E. Valentine	2,529	1.97
Natural Law	David F. Kramer	1,714	1.33
Invalid or blank votes		8,048	5.90
Total votes		136,462	100.00
Turnout			
Republican hold			

=== District 42 ===
California's 42nd congressional district election, 1998
Party	Candidate	Votes	%
Democratic	George Brown, Jr. (incumbent)	62,207	55.29
Republican	Elia Pirozzi	45,328	40.28
American Independent	Hale McGee	3,086	2.74
Libertarian	David Lynn Hollist	1,899	1.69
Invalid or blank votes		6,576	5.52
Total votes		119,096	100.00
Turnout			
Democratic hold			

=== District 43 ===
California's 43rd congressional district election, 1998
Party	Candidate	Votes	%
Republican	Ken Calvert (incumbent)	83,012	55.69
Democratic	Mike Rayburn	56,373	37.82
Green	Phill Courtney	5,508	3.69
Natural Law	Annie Wallack	4,178	2.80
Invalid or blank votes		9,064	5.73
Total votes		158,135	100.00
Turnout			
Republican hold			

=== District 44 ===
California's 44th congressional district election, 1998
Party	Candidate	Votes	%
Republican	Mary Bono (incumbent)	97,013	60.06
Democratic	Ralph Waite	57,697	35.72
Natural Law	Jim J. Meuer	6,818	4.22
Invalid or blank votes		8,675	5.10
Total votes		170,203	100.00
Turnout			
Republican hold			

=== District 45 ===
California's 45th congressional district election, 1998
Party	Candidate	Votes	%
Republican	Dana Rohrabacher (incumbent)	94,296	58.65
Democratic	Patricia W. Neal	60,022	37.33
Libertarian	Don Hull	4,337	2.70
Natural Law	William "Bill" Verkamp Jr.	2,115	1.32
Invalid or blank votes		13,724	7.87
Total votes		174,494	100.00
Turnout			
Republican hold			

=== District 46 ===
==== Polling ====
Poll source	Date(s)	Sample size	Margin of error	Loretta Sanchez (D)	Bob Dornan (R)	Other / undecided
Los Angeles Times	October 17, 1998	1,000	—	48%	34%	18%

==== Results ====
California's 46th congressional district election, 1998
Party	Candidate	Votes	%
Democratic	Loretta Sanchez (incumbent)	47,964	56.43
Republican	Bob Dornan	33,388	39.28
Libertarian	Thomas E. Reimer	2,316	2.72
Natural Law	Larry G. Engwall	1,334	1.57
Invalid or blank votes		4,698	5.24
Total votes		89,700	100.00
Turnout			
Democratic hold			

=== District 47 ===
California's 47th congressional district election, 1998
Party	Candidate	Votes	%
Republican	Christopher Cox (incumbent)	132,711	67.60
Democratic	Christina Avalos	57,938	29.51
Libertarian	Victor A. Wagner, Jr.	2,991	1.52
Reform	Raymond O. Mills	1,369	0.70
Natural Law	Paul Fisher	1,307	0.67
Invalid or blank votes		15,026	7.11
Total votes		211,342	100.00
Turnout			
Republican hold			

=== District 48 ===
California's 48th congressional district election, 1998
Party	Candidate	Votes	%
Republican	Ron Packard (incumbent)	138,948	76.89
Natural Law	Sharon K. Miles	23,262	12.87
Libertarian	Daniel L. Muhe	18,509	10.24
Invalid or blank votes		25,874	12.52
Total votes		206,593	100.00
Turnout			
Republican hold			

=== District 49 ===
California's 49th congressional district election, 1998
Party	Candidate	Votes	%
Republican	Brian Bilbray (incumbent)	90,516	48.79
Democratic	Christine Kehoe	86,400	46.57
Libertarian	Ernest Lippe	3,327	1.79
Natural Law	Julia F. Simon	2,829	1.52
Peace and Freedom	Janice Jordan	2,447	1.32
Invalid or blank votes		11,370	5.77
Total votes		196,889	100.00
Turnout			
Republican hold			

=== District 50 ===
California's 50th congressional district election, 1998
Party	Candidate	Votes	%
Democratic	Bob Filner (incumbent)	77,354	99.18
No party	Jon Parungoa (write-in)	596	0.77
No party	Petra E. Barajas (write-in)	41	0.05
Invalid or blank votes		37,243	32.32
Total votes		115,234	100.00
Turnout			
Democratic hold			

=== District 51 ===
California's 51st congressional district election, 1998
Party	Candidate	Votes	%
Republican	Duke Cunningham (incumbent)	126,229	61.02
Democratic	Dan Kripke	71,706	34.66
Libertarian	Jack Anderson	5,411	2.62
Natural Law	Eric Bourdette	3,532	1.71
No party	Don J. Pando (write-in)	0	0.00
Invalid or blank votes		15,616	7.02
Total votes		222,494	100.00
Turnout			
Republican hold			

=== District 52 ===
California's 52nd congressional district election, 1998
Party	Candidate	Votes	%
Republican	Duncan Hunter (incumbent)	116,251	75.70
Libertarian	Lynn Badler	21,933	14.28
Natural Law	Adrienne Pelton	15,380	10.02
No party	Bill Warren (write-in)	4	0.00
Invalid or blank votes		18,625	10.82
Total votes		172,193	100.00
Turnout			
Republican hold			

== See also ==
- 106th United States Congress
- Political party strength in California
- Political party strength in U.S. states
- 1998 United States House of Representatives elections
