= Ron Packard =

American politician (born 1931)

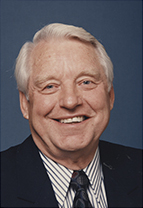

Member of the U.S. House of Representatives from California
- In office January 3, 1983 – January 3, 2001
- Preceded by: Clair Burgener
- Succeeded by: Darrell Issa
- Constituency: 43rd district (1983–1993); 48th district (1993–2001)

Personal details
- Born: January 19, 1931 (age 95) Meridian, Idaho, U.S.
- Party: Republican
- Spouse(s): Jean Packard; Verdie Packard
- Education: Brigham Young University; Portland State University; Oregon Health and Science University (DMD)

Ronald C. Packard (born January 19, 1931) is an American retired Republican politician from California who served in the U.S. House of Representatives from 1983 to 2001.

== Biography ==
Ronald C. Packard was born and raised in Meridian, Idaho. He attended Meridian High School, Brigham Young University, Portland State University, and University of Oregon Dental School (now the Oregon Health & Science University School of Dentistry), where he received a D.M.D. in 1957. He was in the Navy Dental Corps during 1957–1959, and worked as a dentist after leaving the navy.

Packard first entered politics as a trustee of the Carlsbad Unified School District in California, and served during 1962–1974. He was elected to the Carlsbad City Council in 1976, then elected Mayor of Carlsbad in 1978. While mayor, he was active in community and regional affairs, serving on the transportation policy committee of the League of California Cities, as a Director of North County Transit District, and as President of the Council of Mayors for San Diego County.

== 1982 election ==
In 1982, Packard lost the Republican primary for the United States House of Representatives in a crowded field of candidates to Johnnie R. Crean by 92 votes. Crean's character came into issue, with his negative ads and false claim of endorsement by Ronald Reagan, so Packard launched a campaign as a write-in candidate. Packard ran a poll which found that voters would vote for him, especially if they knew how to write him in. Packard campaigned with a gigantic pencil as a prop while giving out golf pencils to district residents. An organized effort among fellow Mormons helped the campaign. Packard won the election by 11,000 votes to become the first independent write-in candidate to defeat candidates of both the Democratic and Republican parties. NPR's Ken Rudin described the race this way:

Eighteen Republicans were running in the primary for the seat being vacated by Rep. Clair Burgener (R). The winner was political novice Johnnie Crean, whose family wealth bankrolled his saturation of the airwaves in the district, situated just north of San Diego. Crean spent well over $750,000 in the primary, then a substantial amount, mostly attacking his fellow Republicans, while ducking candidate forums and personal appearances. Crean defeated Carlsbad Mayor Ron Packard in the primary by 92 votes out of more than 83,000 cast. Furious, Packard announced a write-in effort. Fearful that the GOP split in this overwhelming GOP district could end up electing a Democrat, there was great pressure on Packard to end his bid. But he refused, and won the seat with 37 percent of the vote. The Democrat, Roy "Pat" Archer, finished second with 32 percent; Crean received 31 percent.

Packard was only the third person to be elected to Congress as a write-in candidate, a victory later documented in Campaigns and Elections and due in part to the efforts of Russell Reed Benedict. The two previously successful congressional write-in candidates were U.S. Rep. Joe Skeen (R-New Mexico 2nd District) in 1980 and Sen. Strom Thurmond (R-South Carolina) in 1954. Subsequently, Alaska Republican U.S. Senator Lisa Murkowski lost her party primary in 2010, but waged a successful write-in campaign against Joe Miller, the Republican primary winner and narrowly defeated him in the general election. Upon being sworn in, Packard joined the Republican caucus. He was reelected as a Republican eight times with little opposition in the heavily Republican district.

== Tenure ==
Packard's congressional career included membership on the House Appropriations Committee. Packard served a total of nine terms and then retired from the House at the end of his term in 2001. He was succeeded by Republican Darrell Issa.

== Retirement and private life ==
A U.S. Post Office building in Oceanside, California was named for him in 2002. The westernmost 16.6-miles of California State Route 78 between Interstate 5 in Oceanside, California and Interstate 15 in Escondido, California is designated Ronald Packard Parkway.

== Electoral history ==
1982 United States House of Representatives elections in California
Party	Candidate	Votes	%
Republican	Ron Packard (write-in)	66,444	36.8
Democratic	Roy Pat Archer	57,995	32.1
Republican	Johnnie R. Crean	56,297	31.1
Total votes		180,736	100.0
Republican hold			

1984 United States House of Representatives elections in California
Party	Candidate	Votes	%
Republican	Ron Packard (Incumbent)	165,643	74.1
Democratic	Lois E. Humphreys	50,996	22.8
Libertarian	Phyllis Avery	6,878	3.1
Total votes		223,517	100.0
Republican hold			

1986 United States House of Representatives elections in California
Party	Candidate	Votes	%
Republican	Ron Packard (Incumbent)	137,341	73.1
Democratic	Joseph Chirra	45,078	24.0
Libertarian	Phyllis Avery	5,370	2.9
Total votes		187,789	100.0
Republican hold			

1988 United States House of Representatives elections in California
Party	Candidate	Votes	%
Republican	Ron Packard (Incumbent)	202,478	71.7
Democratic	Howard Greenbaum	72,499	25.6
Libertarian	Daniel L. Muhe	7,552	2.7
Total votes		282,529	100.0
Republican hold			

1990 United States House of Representatives elections in California
Party	Candidate	Votes	%
Republican	Ron Packard (Incumbent)	151,206	68.1
Peace and Freedom	Doug Hansen	40,212	18.1
Libertarian	Richard L. "Rick" Arnold	30,720	13.8
Total votes		222,138	100.0
Republican hold			

1992 United States House of Representatives elections in California
Party	Candidate	Votes	%
Republican	Ron Packard (Incumbent)	140,935	61.1
Democratic	Michael P. "Mike" Farber	67,415	29.3
Peace and Freedom	Donna White	13,396	5.8
Libertarian	Ted Lowe	8,749	3.8
Total votes		230,495	100.0
Republican hold			

1994 United States House of Representatives elections in California
Party	Candidate	Votes	%
Republican	Ron Packard (Incumbent)	143,570	73.4
Democratic	Andrei Leschick	43,523	22.2
Reform	Donna White	8,543	4.4
Total votes		195,636	100.0
Republican hold			

1996 United States House of Representatives elections in California
Party	Candidate	Votes	%
Republican	Ron Packard (Incumbent)	145,814	65.9
Democratic	Dan Farrell	59,558	26.9
Reform	William Dreu	8,013	3.6
Natural Law	Sharon Miles	8,006	3.6
Total votes		221,391	100.0
Republican hold			

1998 United States House of Representatives elections in California
Party	Candidate	Votes	%
Republican	Ron Packard (Incumbent)	138,948	76.9
Natural Law	Sharon K. Miles	23,262	12.9
Libertarian	Daniel L. Muhe	18,509	10.2
Total votes		180,719	100.0
Republican hold			

U.S. House of Representatives
Preceded by Clair Burgener	Member of the U.S. House of Representatives from California's 43rd congressional district 1983–1993	Succeeded by Ken Calvert
New constituency	Member of the U.S. House of Representatives from California's 48th congressional district 1993–2001	Succeeded by Darrell Issa
U.S. order of precedence (ceremonial)
Preceded by Dan Lungren as Former U.S. Representative	Order of precedence of the United States as Former U.S. Representative	Succeeded by John Doolittle as Former U.S. Representative
