= California's 52nd congressional district =

U.S. House district for California

Coordinates: 32.87°N 117.18°W

- Interactive map of district boundaries
- Representative: Juan Vargas; D–San Diego
- Population (2025): 744,227
- Median household income: $90,814
- Ethnicity: 60.1% Hispanic; 14.7% Asian; 13.4% White; 7.5% Black; 3.3% Two or more races; 1.1% other
- Cook PVI: D+13

California's 52nd congressional district is a congressional district in the U.S. state of California. The district is currently represented by Democrat Juan Vargas.

The district currently includes the South Bay region of San Diego County. Cities in the district include National City, Chula Vista and Imperial Beach as well as the Hispanic-majority southern portion of San Diego.

== Recent election results from statewide races ==
=== 2023–2027 boundaries ===
Year	Office	Results
2008	President	Obama 65% - 34%
2010	Governor	Brown 57% - 35%
2010	Lt. Governor	Newsom 51% - 36%
2010	Secretary of State	Bowen 58% - 31%
2010	Attorney General	Harris 51% - 38%
2010	Treasurer	Lockyer 60% - 31%
2010	Controller	Chiang 62% - 28%
2012	President	Obama 68% - 32%
2014	Governor	Brown 65% - 35%
2016	President	Clinton 71% - 24%
2018	Governor	Newsom 67% - 33%
2018	Attorney General	Becerra 70% - 30%
2020	President	Biden 67% - 31%
2022	Senate (Reg.)	Padilla 65% - 35%
2022	Governor	Newsom 63% - 37%
2022	Lt. Governor	Kounalakis 63% - 37%
2022	Secretary of State	Weber 64% - 36%
2022	Attorney General	Bonta 63% - 37%
2022	Treasurer	Ma 62% - 38%
2022	Controller	Cohen 60% - 40%
2024	President	Harris 59% - 38%
2024	Senate (Reg.)	Schiff 61% - 39%

=== 2027–2033 boundaries ===
Year	Office	Results
2008	President	Obama 65% - 34%
2010	Governor	Brown 57% - 35%
2010	Lt. Governor	Newsom 51% - 36%
2010	Secretary of State	Bowen 58% - 31%
2010	Attorney General	Harris 51% - 38%
2010	Treasurer	Lockyer 60% - 31%
2010	Controller	Chiang 62% - 28%
2012	President	Obama 68% - 32%
2014	Governor	Brown 65% - 35%
2016	President	Clinton 71% - 24%
2018	Governor	Newsom 67% - 33%
2018	Attorney General	Becerra 70% - 30%
2020	President	Biden 67% - 31%
2022	Senate (Reg.)	Padilla 65% - 35%
2022	Governor	Newsom 63% - 37%
2022	Lt. Governor	Kounalakis 63% - 37%
2022	Secretary of State	Weber 64% - 36%
2022	Attorney General	Bonta 63% - 37%
2022	Treasurer	Ma 62% - 38%
2022	Controller	Cohen 60% - 40%
2024	President	Harris 59% - 38%
2024	Senate (Reg.)	Schiff 61% - 39%

== Composition ==
FIPS County Code	County	Seat	Population
73	San Diego	San Diego	3,269,973

Under the 2020 redistricting, California's 52nd congressional district is located in Southern California, encompassing the South Bay region of San Diego County. It includes the San Diego neighborhoods of Paradise Hills, Logan Heights, Encanto, Mountain View, Barrio Logan, Shelltown, Lincoln Park, Nestor, Otay Mesa, and South San Diego; the cities of Chula Vista, National City, and Imperial Beach; and the census-designated place Bonita.

San Diego County is split between this district, the 50th district, the 51st district, and the 48th district. The 52nd and 48th are partitioned by San Miguel Rd, Proctor Valley Rd, Camino Mojave/Jonel Way, Highway 125, Upper Otay Reservoir, Otay Lakes Rd, Otay Valley Regional Park, Alta Rd, and Otay Mountain Truck Trail.

The 52nd and 50th are partitioned by Iowa St, University Ave, Inland Freeway, Escondido Freeway, Martin Luther King Jr Freeway, John J Montgomery Freeway, and San Diego Bay.

The 52nd and the 51st are partitioned by El Cajon Blvd, 58th St, Streamview Dr, College Ave, Meridian Ave, Lemarand Ave, Highway 94, Charlene Ave, 69th St, Imperial Ave, Larwood Rd, Taft St, Lincoln Pl, Glencoe Dr, Braddock St, Carlisle Dr, Carlsbad Ct/Osage Dr, Potrero St, Carlsbad St, Innsdale Ave, Worthington St/Innsdale Ln, Brady Ct/Innsdale Ln, Parkbrook Way/Alene St, Tinaja Ln/Bluffview Rd, Highway 54, Sweetwater Rd, and Bonita Rd.

=== Cities and CDPs with 10,000 or more people ===
- San Diego – 1,388,320
- Chula Vista – 275,487
- National City – 56,173
- Imperial Beach – 26,137
- Bonita – 12,917

== List of members representing the district ==
Member	Party	Dates	Cong ress(es)	Electoral history	Counties
District created January 3, 1993
Duncan L. Hunter (Alpine)	Republican	January 3, 1993 – January 3, 2009	103rd 104th 105th 106th 107th 108th 109th 110th	Redistricted from the 45th district and re-elected in 1992. Re-elected in 1994. Re-elected in 1996. Re-elected in 1998. Re-elected in 2000. Re-elected in 2002. Re-elected in 2004. Re-elected in 2006. Retired.	1993–2003; Imperial; Eastern San Diego
Duncan L. Hunter (Alpine)	Republican	January 3, 1993 – January 3, 2009	103rd 104th 105th 106th 107th 108th 109th 110th	Redistricted from the 45th district and re-elected in 1992. Re-elected in 1994. Re-elected in 1996. Re-elected in 1998. Re-elected in 2000. Re-elected in 2002. Re-elected in 2004. Re-elected in 2006. Retired.	2003–2013 Eastern San Diego
Duncan D. Hunter (Lakeside)	Republican	January 3, 2009 – January 3, 2013	111th 112th	Elected in 2008. Re-elected in 2010. Redistricted to the 50th district.	2003–2013 Eastern San Diego
Scott Peters (San Diego)	Democratic	January 3, 2013 – January 3, 2023	113th 114th 115th 116th 117th	Elected in 2012. Re-elected in 2014. Re-elected in 2016. Re-elected in 2018. Re-elected in 2020. Redistricted to the 50th district.	2013–2023 Coastal San Diego (La Jolla and Poway)
Juan Vargas (San Diego)	Democratic	January 3, 2023 – present	118th 119th	Redistricted from the 51st district and re-elected in 2022. Re-elected in 2024. Re-elected in 2026.	2023–present: Southwestern San Diego County

== Election results ==
=== 1992 ===
1992 United States House of Representatives elections in California
Party	Candidate	Votes	%
Republican	Duncan Hunter (incumbent)	112,995	52.9
Democratic	Janet M. Gastil	88,076	41.2
Libertarian	Joe Shea	6,977	3.3
Peace and Freedom	Dennis P. Gretsinger	5,734	2.7
Total votes		213,784	100.0
Republican hold			

=== 1994 ===
1994 United States House of Representatives elections in California
Party	Candidate	Votes	%
Republican	Duncan Hunter (incumbent)	109,201	64.0
Democratic	Janet M. Gastil	53,024	31.1
Libertarian	Joe Shea	5,240	3.0
Peace and Freedom	Art Edelman	3,221	1.9
Total votes		170,686	100.0
Republican hold			

=== 1996 ===
1996 United States House of Representatives elections in California
Party	Candidate	Votes	%
Republican	Duncan Hunter (incumbent)	116,746	65.5
Democratic	Darity Wesley	53,104	29.8
Peace and Freedom	Janice Jordan	3,649	2.1
Libertarian	Dante Ridley	3,329	1.8
Natural Law	Peter Ballantyne	1,493	0.8
Total votes		178,321	100.0
Republican hold			

=== 1998 ===
1998 United States House of Representatives elections in California
Party	Candidate	Votes	%
Republican	Duncan Hunter (incumbent)	116,251	75.7
Libertarian	Lynn Badler	21,933	14.3
Natural Law	Adrienne Pelton	15,380	10.0
Republican	Bill Warren (write-in)	4	0.0
Total votes		153,568	100.0
Republican hold			

=== 2000 ===
2000 United States House of Representatives elections in California
Party	Candidate	Votes	%
Republican	Duncan Hunter (incumbent)	131,345	64.8
Democratic	Craig Barkacs	63,537	31.3
Libertarian	Michael Benoit	5,995	2.9
Natural Law	Robert A. Sherman	2,117	1.0
Total votes		202,994	100.0
Republican hold			

=== 2002 ===
2002 United States House of Representatives elections in California
Party	Candidate	Votes	%
Republican	Duncan Hunter (incumbent)	118,561	70.2
Democratic	Peter Moore-Kochlacs	43,526	25.8
Libertarian	Michael Benoit	6,923	4.0
Total votes		169,010	100.0
Republican hold			

=== 2004 ===
2004 United States House of Representatives elections in California
Party	Candidate	Votes	%
Republican	Duncan Hunter (incumbent)	187,799	67.0
Democratic	Brian S. Keliher	74,857	27.7
Libertarian	Michael Benoit	8,782	3.3
Total votes		271,438	100.0
Republican hold			

=== 2006 ===
2006 United States House of Representatives elections in California
Party	Candidate	Votes	%
Republican	Duncan Hunter (incumbent)	123,696	64.7
Democratic	John Rinaldi	61,208	32.0
Libertarian	Michael Benoit	6,465	3.3
Total votes		191,369	100.0
Republican hold			

=== 2008 ===
2008 United States House of Representatives elections in California
Party	Candidate	Votes	%
Republican	Duncan D. Hunter	160,724	56.4
Democratic	Mike Lumpkin	111,051	39.0
Libertarian	Michael Benoit	13,316	4.6
Total votes		285,091	100.0
Republican hold			

=== 2010 ===
2010 United States House of Representatives elections in California
Party	Candidate	Votes	%
Republican	Duncan D. Hunter (incumbent)	139,437	63.1
Democratic	Ray Lutz	70,860	32.1
Libertarian	Michael Benoit	10,731	4.8
Total votes		221,028	100.0
Republican hold			

=== 2012 ===
2012 United States House of Representatives elections in California
Party	Candidate	Votes	%
Democratic	Scott Peters	151,451	51.2
Republican	Brian Bilbray (Incumbent)	144,459	48.8
Total votes		295,910	100.0
Democratic gain from Republican			

=== 2014 ===
2014 United States House of Representatives elections in California
Party	Candidate	Votes	%
Democratic	Scott Peters (Incumbent)	98,826	51.6
Republican	Carl DeMaio	92,746	48.4
Total votes		191,572	100.0
Democratic hold			

=== 2016 ===
2016 United States House of Representatives elections in California
Party	Candidate	Votes	%
Democratic	Scott Peters (incumbent)	181,253	56.5
Republican	Denise Gitsham	139,403	43.5
Total votes		320,656	100.0
Democratic hold			

=== 2018 ===
2018 United States House of Representatives elections in California
Party	Candidate	Votes	%
Democratic	Scott Peters (incumbent)	188,992	63.8
Republican	Omar Qudrat	107,015	36.2
Total votes		296,007	100.0
Democratic hold			

=== 2020 ===
2020 United States House of Representatives elections in California
Party	Candidate	Votes	%
Democratic	Scott Peters (incumbent)	244,145	61.6
Republican	Jim DeBello	152,350	38.4
Total votes		396,495	100.0
Democratic hold			

=== 2022 ===
2022 United States House of Representatives elections in California
Party	Candidate	Votes	%
Democratic	Juan Vargas (incumbent)	100,686	66.7
Republican	Tyler Geffeney	50,330	33.3
Total votes		151,016	100.0
Democratic hold			

=== 2024 ===
2024 United States House of Representatives elections in California
Party	Candidate	Votes	%
Democratic	Juan Vargas (incumbent)	172,217	66.3
Republican	Justin Lee	87,501	33.7
Total votes		259,718	100.0
Democratic hold			

== Historical district boundaries ==
From 2003 through 2013, the district consisted of many of San Diego's northern and eastern suburbs, including Lakeside, Poway, Ramona, La Mesa, and Spring Valley. Due to redistricting after the 2010 United States census, much of this area is now in the 50th district.

=== 2003–13 ===
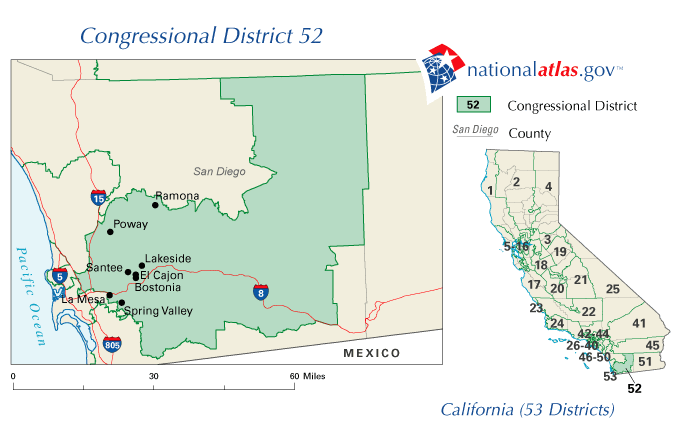

=== 2013–23 ===
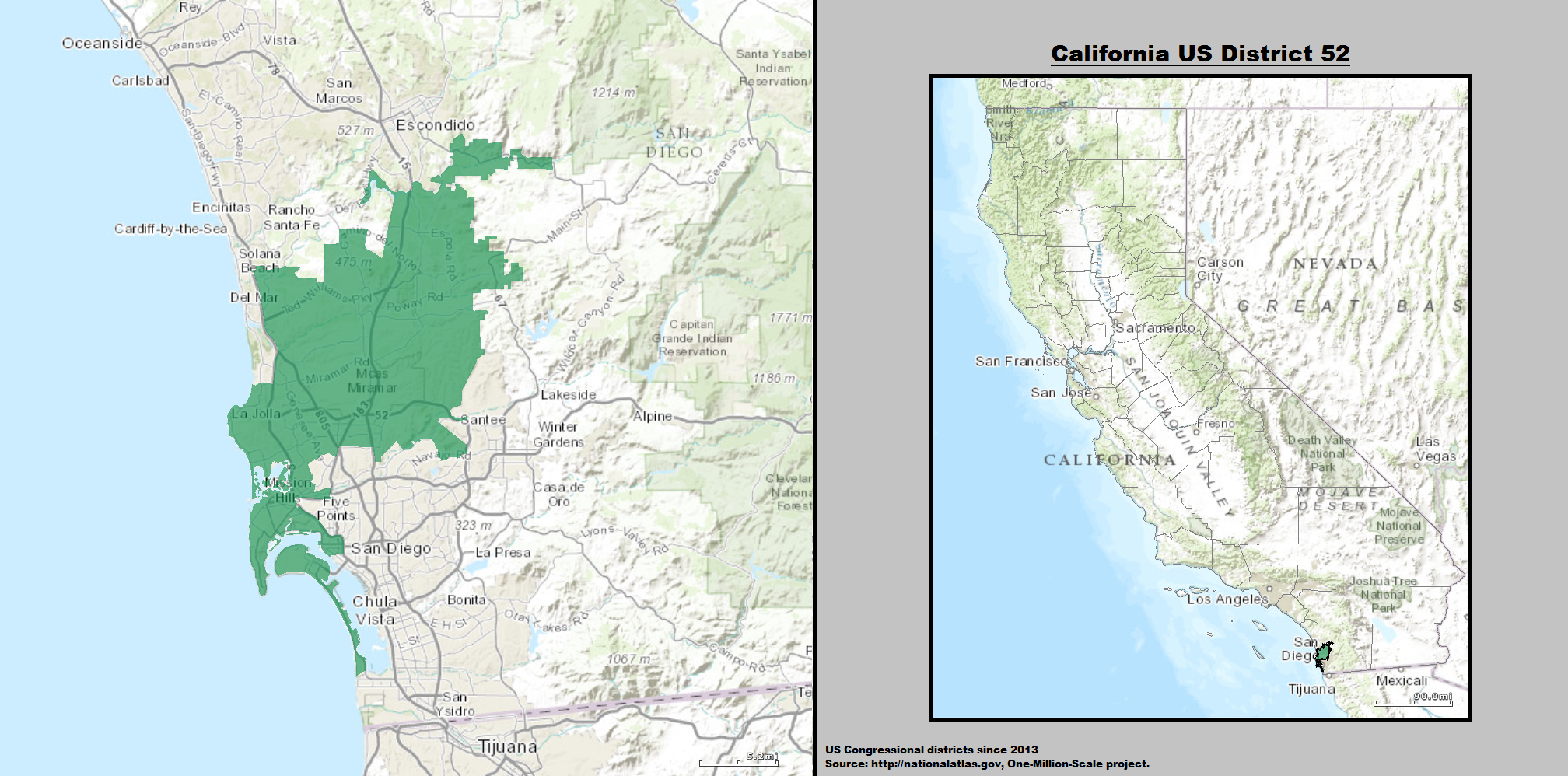

== See also ==
- California's congressional delegations
- California's congressional districts
- List of United States congressional districts
