= California's 43rd congressional district =

U.S. House district for California

Coordinates: 33°54′11″N 118°20′11″W

- Interactive map of district boundaries since January 3, 2023 (Note: The district includes the same census blocks as drawn by the Citizens Redistricting Commission in 2021 and during mid-decade redistricting as passed in Prop 50 (2025). As such, boundaries of the district will not change at the 2026 elections.)
- Representative: Maxine Waters; D–Los Angeles
- Population (2025): 718,757
- Median household income: $78,192
- Ethnicity: 57.2% Hispanic; 23.8% Black; 8.3% Asian; 6.9% White; 2.6% Two or more races; 1.2% other
- Cook PVI: D+27

California's 43rd congressional district is a congressional district in the U.S. state of California that is currently represented by Democrat Maxine Waters. The district is centered in the southern part of Los Angeles County, and includes portions of the cities of Los Angeles (including Los Angeles International Airport) and Torrance. It includes the entirety of the cities of Hawthorne, Lawndale, Gardena, Inglewood, and Lomita. From 2003 until 2013, the 43rd district was based in San Bernardino County. The Hispanic-majority district encompassed the southwestern part of the county, and included San Bernardino and Rialto.

== Recent election results from statewide races ==
=== 2023–2033 boundaries ===
| Year | Office | Results |
|---|---|---|
| 2008 | President | Obama 84%–15% |
| 2010 | Governor | Brown 79%–17% |
| 2010 | Lt. Governor | Newsom 72%–18% |
| 2010 | Secretary of State | Bowen 77%–15% |
| 2010 | Attorney General | Harris 72%–21% |
| 2010 | Treasurer | Lockyer 79%–15% |
| 2010 | Controller | Chiang 78%–15% |
| 2012 | President | Obama 87%–13% |
| 2014 | Governor | Brown 80%–20% |
| 2016 | President | Clinton 84%–11% |
| 2018 | Governor | Newsom 83%–17% |
| 2018 | Attorney General | Becerra 85%–15% |
| 2020 | President | Biden 81%–17% |
| 2022 | Senate (Reg.) | Padilla 80%–20% |
| 2022 | Governor | Newsom 78%–22% |
| 2022 | Lt. Governor | Kounalakis 76%–24% |
| 2022 | Secretary of State | Weber 79%–21% |
| 2022 | Attorney General | Bonta 78%–22% |
| 2022 | Treasurer | Ma 78%–22% |
| 2022 | Controller | Cohen 76%–24% |
| 2024 | President | Harris 73%–24% |
| 2024 | Senate (Reg.) | Schiff 74%–26% |

== Composition ==
| FIPS County Code | County | Seat | Population |
|---|---|---|---|
| 37 | Los Angeles | Los Angeles | 9,663,345 |

Under the 2020 redistricting, California's 43rd congressional district is located in the South Bay region of Los Angeles County. This district includes Los Angeles International Airport; the cities of Hawthorne, Inglewood, Lawndale, Gardena, Compton, northeast Torrance; the Los Angeles neighborhood of Watts; and the census-designated places Lennox, Del Aire, Alondra Park, West Athens, Westmont, West Rancho Dominguez, Willowbrook, and East Rancho Dominguez.

This district, the 36th district, 37th district, 44th district, and the 42nd district are all entirely within Los Angeles County. The 43rd and 36th are partitioned by W Florence Ave, Arbor Vitae St, Westchester Parkway, La Tijera Blvd, W 91st St, Cum Laude Ave, W 92nd St, Waterview St, Napoleon St, Vista Del Mar, W Imperial Highway, Aviation Blvd, Del Aire Park, E Sl Segundo Blvd, S Aviation Blvd, Marine Ave, Inglewood Ave, Highway 91, Redondo Beach Blvd, Hawthorne Blvd, and Sepulveda Blvd.

The 43rd, 37th and 42nd are partitioned by E 91st St, McKinley Ave, E 88th Pl, Avalon Blvd, E Manchester Ave, S Normandie Ave, W 94th Pl, S Halldale Ave, W Century Blvd, La Salle Ave/S Denker Ave, W 104th St, S Western Ave, W 108th St, S Gramercy Pl, S Van Ness Ave, W 76th St, 8th Ave, W 79th St, S Victoria Ave, W 74th St, West Blvd, W 64th St, S La Brea Ave, 6231 S La Brea Ave-Flight Ave, W 64th St, 6404 S Springpark Ave-W Fairview Blvd, W Centinela Ave, Ave, S Central Ave, Firestone Blvd-E 90 St, S Central Ave, E 103rd St, Success Ave, E 92nd St, E 91st, Croesus Ave, and E 97th St.

The 43rd and the 44th are partitioned by Alameda St, E 103rd St, Mona Blvd, E 107th Pl, E 108th St, S Alameda St, Highway 105, Mona Blvd, Santa Fe Ave, E Stockton Ave, N Bullis Rd, Palm Ave/E Killen Pl, N Thorson Ave, McMillan St, Waldorf Dr/N Castlegate Ave, S Gibson Ave, Wright Rd, E Rosecrans Ave, Highway 710, Somerset Blvd, Myrrh St, Hunsake Ave, Alondra Blvd, E Greenleaf Blvd, Main Campus Dr, S Susana Rd, Highway 91, Highway 47, Calle Anita, 2605 Homestead Pl-266 W Apras St, 255 W Victoria St-18300 S Wilmington Ave, W Victoria St, Central Ave, Lincoln Memorial Park, 2600 W Billings St-2973 W Caldwell St, Malloy Ave/S Clymar Ave, W Alondra Blvd, S Figueroa St, W 182nd St, Electric St, and S Western Ave.

=== Cities and CDPs with 10,000 or more people ===
- Los Angeles – 3,820,914
- Torrance – 147,067
- Inglewood – 107,762
- Compton – 95,740
- Hawthorne – 88,083
- Gardena – 61,027
- Westmont – 33,913
- Lawndale – 31,807
- West Rancho Dominguez – 24,347
- Willowbrook – 24,295
- Lennox – 20,323
- East Rancho Dominguez – 15,114
- Del Aire – 10,338

=== 2,500 – 10,000 people ===
- West Athens – 9,393
- Alondra Park – 8,569

== List of members representing the district ==
| Member | Party | Dates | Cong ress(es) | Electoral history | Counties |
|---|---|---|---|---|---|
District created January 3, 1973
| Victor Veysey (Brawley) | Republican | January 3, 1973 – January 3, 1975 | 93rd | Redistricted from the 38th district and re-elected in 1972. Retired. | 1973–1975; Imperial, Riverside, Inland San Diego |
| Clair Burgener (Rancho Santa Fe) | Republican | January 3, 1975 – January 3, 1983 | 94th 95th 96th 97th | Redistricted from the 42nd district and re-elected in 1974. Re-elected in 1976. Re-elected in 1978. Re-elected in 1980. Retired. | 1975–1983; Imperial, Southwestern Riverside, San Diego |
| Ron Packard (Carlsbad) | Republican | January 3, 1983 – January 3, 1993 | 98th 99th 100th 101st 102nd | Elected as a write-in candidate in 1982. Re-elected in 1984. Re-elected in 1986. Re-elected in 1988. Re-elected in 1990. Redistricted to the 48th district. | 1983–1993; Southern Orange, Northwestern San Diego |
| Ken Calvert (Corona) | Republican | January 3, 1993 – January 3, 2003 | 103rd 104th 105th 106th 107th | Elected in 1992. Re-elected in 1994. Re-elected in 1996. Re-elected in 1998. Re-elected in 2000. Redistricted to the 44th district. | 1993–2003; Western Riverside. |
| Joe Baca (Rialto) | Democratic | January 3, 2003 – January 3, 2013 | 108th 109th 110th 111th 112th | Redistricted from the 42nd district and re-elected in 2002. Re-elected in 2004. Re-elected in 2006. Re-elected in 2008. Re-elected in 2010. Redistricted to the 35th district and lost. | 2003–2013 San Bernardino (Fontana, Ontario, San Bernardino) |
| Maxine Waters (Los Angeles) | Democratic | January 3, 2013 – present | 113th 114th 115th 116th 117th 118th 119th | Redistricted from the 35th district and re-elected in 2012. Re-elected in 2014. Re-elected in 2016. Re-elected in 2018. Re-elected in 2020. Re-elected in 2022. Re-elected in 2024. Re-elected in 2026. | 2013–2023 South Los Angeles (Hawthorne and Inglewood) |
| Maxine Waters (Los Angeles) | Democratic | January 3, 2013 – present | 113th 114th 115th 116th 117th 118th 119th | Redistricted from the 35th district and re-elected in 2012. Re-elected in 2014. Re-elected in 2016. Re-elected in 2018. Re-elected in 2020. Re-elected in 2022. Re-elected in 2024. Re-elected in 2026. | 2023–present South Los Angeles (Hawthorne and Inglewood) |

== Election results ==
=== 1972 ===
1972 United States House of Representatives elections in California
| Party | Candidate | Votes | % |
|---|---|---|---|
| Republican | Victor Veysey (Incumbent) | 117,781 | 62.7 |
| Democratic | Ernest Z. Robles | 70,129 | 37.3 |
| Total votes | | 187,910 | 100.0 |
| Republican win (new seat) | | | |

=== 1974 ===
1974 United States House of Representatives elections in California
| Party | Candidate | Votes | % |
|---|---|---|---|
| Republican | Clair Burgener (Incumbent) | 114,102 | 60.4 |
| Democratic | Bill Bandes | 74,905 | 39.6 |
| Total votes | | 189,007 | 100.0 |
| Republican hold | | | |

=== 1976 ===
1976 United States House of Representatives elections in California
| Party | Candidate | Votes | % |
|---|---|---|---|
| Republican | Clair Burgener (Incumbent) | 173,576 | 65.0 |
| Democratic | Pat Kelly | 93,475 | 35.0 |
| Total votes | | 267,051 | 100.0 |
| Republican hold | | | |

=== 1978 ===
1978 United States House of Representatives elections in California
| Party | Candidate | Votes | % |
|---|---|---|---|
| Republican | Clair Burgener (Incumbent) | 167,150 | 68.7 |
| Democratic | Reuben B. Brooks | 76,308 | 31.3 |
| Total votes | | 243,458 | 100.0 |
| Republican hold | | | |

=== 1980 ===
1980 United States House of Representatives elections in California
| Party | Candidate | Votes | % |
|---|---|---|---|
| Republican | Clair Burgener (Incumbent) | 298,815 | 86.6 |
| Democratic | Tom Metzger | 46,361 | 13.4 |
| Total votes | | 345,176 | 100.0 |
| Republican hold | | | |

=== 1982 ===
1982 United States House of Representatives elections in California
| Party | Candidate | Votes | % |
|---|---|---|---|
| Republican | Ron Packard (write-in) | 66,444 | 36.8 |
| Democratic | Roy Pat Archer | 57,995 | 32.1 |
| Republican | Johnnie R. Crean | 56,297 | 31.1 |
| Total votes | | 180,736 | 100.0 |
| Republican hold | | | |

=== 1984 ===
1984 United States House of Representatives elections in California
| Party | Candidate | Votes | % |
|---|---|---|---|
| Republican | Ron Packard (Incumbent) | 165,643 | 74.1 |
| Democratic | Lois E. Humphreys | 50,996 | 22.8 |
| Libertarian | Phyllis Avery | 6,878 | 3.1 |
| Total votes | | 223,517 | 100.0 |
| Republican hold | | | |

=== 1986 ===
1986 United States House of Representatives elections in California
| Party | Candidate | Votes | % |
|---|---|---|---|
| Republican | Ron Packard (Incumbent) | 137,341 | 73.1 |
| Democratic | Joseph Chirra | 45,078 | 24.0 |
| Libertarian | Phyllis Avery | 5,370 | 2.9 |
| Total votes | | 187,789 | 100.0 |
| Republican hold | | | |

=== 1988 ===
1988 United States House of Representatives elections in California
| Party | Candidate | Votes | % |
|---|---|---|---|
| Republican | Ron Packard (Incumbent) | 202,478 | 71.7 |
| Democratic | Howard Greenbaum | 72,499 | 25.6 |
| Libertarian | Daniel L. Muhe | 7,552 | 2.7 |
| Total votes | | 282,529 | 100.0 |
| Republican hold | | | |

=== 1990 ===
1990 United States House of Representatives elections in California
| Party | Candidate | Votes | % |
|---|---|---|---|
| Republican | Ron Packard (Incumbent) | 151,206 | 68.1 |
| Peace and Freedom | Doug Hansen | 40,212 | 18.1 |
| Libertarian | Richard L. "Rick" Arnold | 30,720 | 13.8 |
| Total votes | | 222,138 | 100.0 |
| Republican hold | | | |

=== 1992 ===
1992 United States House of Representatives elections in California
| Party | Candidate | Votes | % |
|---|---|---|---|
| Republican | Ken Calvert | 88,987 | 46.7 |
| Democratic | Mark A. Takano | 88,468 | 46.4 |
| American Independent | Gary Odom | 6,095 | 3.2 |
| Libertarian | Gene L. Berkman | 4,989 | 2.6 |
| Independent | John Schwab (write-in) | 2,100 | 1.1 |
| Invalid or blank votes | | 13,210 | 6.5 |
| Total votes | | 203,849 | 100.0 |
| Republican hold | | | |

=== 1994 ===
1994 United States House of Representatives elections in California
| Party | Candidate | Votes | % |
|---|---|---|---|
| Republican | Ken Calvert (Incumbent) | 84,500 | 54.7 |
| Democratic | Mark A. Takano | 59,342 | 38.4 |
| Libertarian | Gene L. Berkman | 9,636 | 6.3 |
| Independent | John Schwab (write-in) | 767 | 0.5 |
| Independent | Velma Hickey (write-in) | 141 | 0.1 |
| Invalid or blank votes | | 6,421 | 4.0 |
| Total votes | | 160,807 | 100.0 |
| Republican hold | | | |

=== 1996 ===
1996 United States House of Representatives elections in California
| Party | Candidate | Votes | % |
|---|---|---|---|
| Republican | Ken Calvert (Incumbent) | 97,247 | 54.7 |
| Democratic | Guy Kimbrough | 67,422 | 37.9 |
| Natural Law | Annie Wallack | 6,576 | 3.7 |
| Peace and Freedom | Kevin Akin | 3,309 | 1.9 |
| Libertarian | Gene Berkman | 3,086 | 1.7 |
| Independent | Colleen Cummings (write-in) | 84 | 0.1 |
| Invalid or blank votes | | 6,571 | 3.6 |
| Total votes | | 184,295 | 100.0 |
| Republican hold | | | |

=== 1998 ===
1998 United States House of Representatives elections in California
| Party | Candidate | Votes | % |
|---|---|---|---|
| Republican | Ken Calvert (Incumbent) | 83,012 | 55.7 |
| Democratic | Mike Rayburn | 56,373 | 37.8 |
| Green | Phill Courtney | 5,508 | 3.7 |
| Natural Law | Annie Wallack | 4,178 | 2.8 |
| Invalid or blank votes | | 9,064 | 5.7 |
| Total votes | | 158,135 | 100.0 |
| Republican hold | | | |

=== 2000 ===
2000 United States House of Representatives elections in California
| Party | Candidate | Votes | % |
|---|---|---|---|
| Republican | Ken Calvert (Incumbent) | 140,201 | 73.7 |
| Libertarian | Bill Reed | 29,755 | 15.6 |
| Natural Law | Nat Adam | 20,376 | 10.7 |
| Invalid or blank votes | | 0 | 0.0 |
| Total votes | | 190,332 | 100.0 |
| Republican hold | | | |

=== 2002 ===
2002 United States House of Representatives elections in California
| Party | Candidate | Votes | % |
|---|---|---|---|
| Democratic | Joe Baca (Incumbent) | 45,374 | 66.4 |
| Republican | Wendy C. Neighbor | 20,821 | 30.5 |
| Libertarian | Ethel M. Mohler | 2,145 | 3.1 |
| Invalid or blank votes | | 5,273 | 7.2 |
| Total votes | | 73,613 | 100.0 |
| Democratic hold | | | |

=== 2004 ===
2004 United States House of Representatives elections in California
| Party | Candidate | Votes | % |
|---|---|---|---|
| Democratic | Joe Baca (Incumbent) | 86,830 | 66.4 |
| Republican | Ed Laning | 44,004 | 33.6 |
| Independent | Barry J. Patts (write-in) | 0 | 0.0 |
| Total votes | | 130,834 | 100.0 |
| Democratic hold | | | |

=== 2006 ===
2006 United States House of Representatives elections in California
| Party | Candidate | Votes | % |
|---|---|---|---|
| Democratic | Joe Baca (Incumbent) | 52,791 | 64.5 |
| Republican | Scott Folkens | 29,069 | 35.5 |
| Total votes | | 81,860 | 100.0 |
| Democratic hold | | | |

=== 2008 ===
2008 United States House of Representatives elections in California
| Party | Candidate | Votes | % |
|---|---|---|---|
| Democratic | Joe Baca (Incumbent) | 108,259 | 69.1 |
| Republican | John Roberts | 48,312 | 30.9 |
| Total votes | | 156,571 | 100.0 |
| Turnout | | | 63.4 |
| Democratic hold | | | |

=== 2010 ===
2010 United States House of Representatives elections in California
| Party | Candidate | Votes | % |
|---|---|---|---|
| Democratic | Joe Baca (Incumbent) | 70,026 | 65.5 |
| Republican | Scott Folkens | 36,890 | 34.5 |
| Total votes | | 106,916 | 100.0 |
| Democratic hold | | | |

=== 2012 ===
2012 United States House of Representatives elections in California
| Party | Candidate | Votes | % |
|---|---|---|---|
| Democratic | Maxine Waters (Incumbent) | 143,123 | 71.2 |
| Democratic | Bob Flores | 57,771 | 28.8 |
| Total votes | | 200,894 | 100.0 |
| Democratic hold | | | |

=== 2014 ===
2014 United States House of Representatives elections in California
| Party | Candidate | Votes | % |
|---|---|---|---|
| Democratic | Maxine Waters (Incumbent) | 69,681 | 71.0 |
| Republican | John Wood, Jr. | 28,521 | 29.0 |
| Total votes | | 98,202 | 100.0 |
| Democratic hold | | | |

=== 2016 ===
2016 United States House of Representatives elections in California
| Party | Candidate | Votes | % |
|---|---|---|---|
| Democratic | Maxine Waters (Incumbent) | 167,017 | 76.1 |
| Republican | Omar Navarro | 52,499 | 23.9 |
| Total votes | | 219,516 | 100.0 |
| Democratic hold | | | |

=== 2018 ===
2018 United States House of Representatives elections in California
| Party | Candidate | Votes | % |
|---|---|---|---|
| Democratic | Maxine Waters (Incumbent) | 152,272 | 77.7 |
| Republican | Omar Navarro | 43,780 | 22.3 |
| Total votes | | 196,052 | 100.0 |
| Democratic hold | | | |

=== 2020 ===
2020 United States House of Representatives elections in California
| Party | Candidate | Votes | % |
|---|---|---|---|
| Democratic | Maxine Waters (incumbent) | 199,210 | 71.7 |
| Republican | Joe E. Collins III | 78,688 | 28.3 |
| Total votes | | 277,898 | 100.0 |
| Democratic hold | | | |

=== 2022 ===
2022 United States House of Representatives elections in California
| Party | Candidate | Votes | % |
|---|---|---|---|
| Democratic | Maxine Waters (incumbent) | 95,462 | 77.3 |
| Republican | Omar Navarro | 27,985 | 22.7 |
| Total votes | | 123,447 | 100.0 |
| Democratic hold | | | |

=== 2024 ===
2024 United States House of Representatives elections in California
| Party | Candidate | Votes | % |
|---|---|---|---|
| Democratic | Maxine Waters (incumbent) | 160,080 | 75.1 |
| Republican | Steve Williams | 53,152 | 24.9 |
| Total votes | | 213,232 | 100.0 |
| Democratic hold | | | |

=== 2024 ===
California's 43rd congressional district, 2024
Primary election
| Party | Candidate | Votes | % |
|---|---|---|---|
| Democratic | Maxine Waters (incumbent) | 54,673 | 69.8 |
| Republican | Steve Williams | 10,896 | 13.9 |
| Republican | David Knight | 5,647 | 7.2 |
| Democratic | Chris Wiggins | 4,999 | 6.4 |
| Democratic | Gregory Cheadle | 2,075 | 2.7 |
| Total votes | | 78,290 | 100.0 |
General election
| Democratic | Maxine Waters (incumbent) | 160,080 | 75.1 |
| Republican | Steve Williams | 53,152 | 24.9 |
| Total votes | | 213,232 | 100.0 |
| Democratic hold | | | |

== Historical district boundaries ==
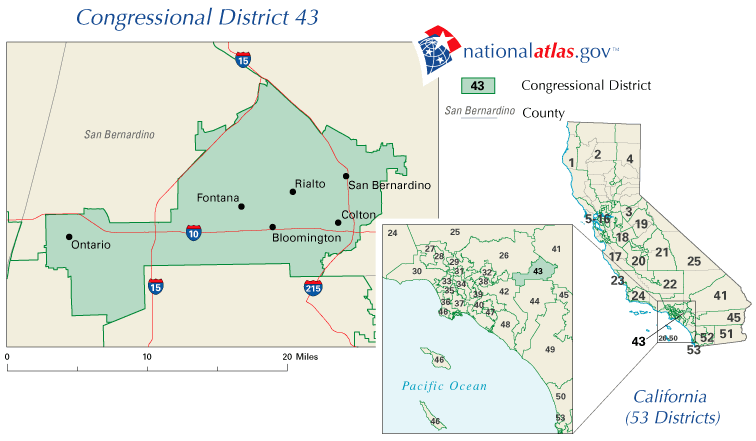
From 2003 through 2013, the district consisted of many of San Bernardino's central suburbs, including San Bernardino, Ontario and Fontana. Due to redistricting after the 2010 United States census, the district has moved south west into South Los Angeles and now includes Hawthorne and Inglewood.

== See also ==
- List of United States congressional districts
- California's congressional districts
