= Maria Armoudian =

American singer-songwriter

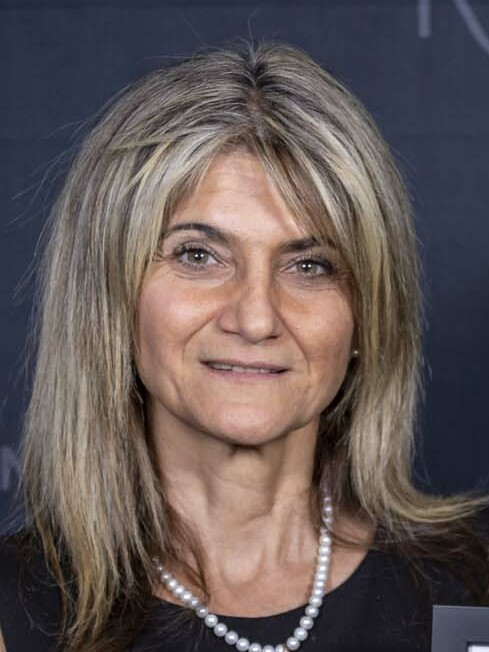
Armoudian received an Early Career Research Award from the Royal Society Te Apārangi in 2023

Maria Armoudian is a politics senior lecturer at the University of Auckland in New Zealand. She is also a published author, radio broadcaster, musician, and journalist. Her three books are Lawyers Beyond Borders: Advancing International Human Rights through Local Laws and Courts; Reporting from the Danger Zone: Frontline Journalists, Their Jobs and an Increasingly Perilous Future (Routledge), and Kill the Messenger: The Media's Role in the Fate of the World (Prometheus Books). Armoudian is of Armenian American descent and is the host and producer of the Scholars' Circle on KPFK. Prior to moving to New Zealand, Armoudian worked as both a city commissioner in Los Angeles for six years and the California State Legislature for eight years. In addition to her academic work, Armoudian has written for several media publications including the Washington Post, Psychology Today, the New York Times syndicate, the Los Angeles Times syndicate, Columbia Journalism Review, the New Zealand Herald, the Los Angeles Daily News, The Progressive, AlterNet, and Salon. Maria's CD is titled "Life in the New World."

== Notable works ==
- Armoudian, Maria. Lawyers Beyond Borders: Advancing International Human Rights through Local Laws and Courts. https://press.umich.edu/Books/L/Lawyers-Beyond-Borders2.
- Armoudian, Maria (2011). Kill the Messenger: The Media's Role in the Fate of the World. Amherst, New York: Prometheus Books. ISBN 978-1616143879.
- Armoudian, Maria (2016). Reporting From the Danger Zone: Frontline Journalists, Their Jobs, and an Increasingly Perilous Future. New York: Routledge. ISBN 978-1138840058.
