= 1996 United States House of Representatives elections in California =

- November 5, 1996

All 52 California seats to the United States House of Representatives
	Majority party	Minority party
Party	Democratic	Republican
Last election	27	25
Seats before	26	26
Seats won	29	23
Seat change	▲3	▼3
Popular vote	4,706,278	4,292,128
Percentage	49.61%	45.25%
- Results: Democratic hold Democratic gain Republican hold

The United States House of Representatives elections in California, 1996 was an election for California's delegation to the United States House of Representatives, which occurred as part of the general election of the House of Representatives on November 5, 1996. The delegation went from being tied to slightly majority-Democratic, with Democrats gaining 3 seats.

== Overview ==
United States House of Representatives elections in California, 1996
Party	Votes	%	Before	After	+/–
Democratic	4,706,278	49.61%	26	29	+3
Republican	4,292,128	45.25%	26	23	-3
Libertarian	213,583	2.25%	0	0	0
Natural Law	131,023	1.38%	0	0	0
Reform	57,513	0.61%	0	0	0
Peace and Freedom	48,136	0.51%	0	0	0
American Independent	17,814	0.19%	0	0	0
Independent	9,845	0.10%	0	0	0
Green	8,805	0.09%	0	0	0
Write-ins	541	0.01%	0	0	0
Invalid or blank votes	780,588	7.60%	—	—	—
Totals	10,266,254	100.00%	52	52	—

== Results ==
Final results from the Secretary of State of California:

=== District 1 ===
California's 1st congressional district election, 1996
Party	Candidate	Votes	%
Republican	Frank Riggs (incumbent)	110,242	49.63
Democratic	Michela Alioto	96,522	43.46
Libertarian	Emil Rossi	15,354	6.91
Invalid or blank votes		19,176	7.95
Total votes		241,294	100.00
Turnout			
Republican hold			

=== District 2 ===
California's 2nd congressional district election, 1996
Party	Candidate	Votes	%
Republican	Wally Herger (incumbent)	144,913	60.80
Democratic	Roberts Braden	80,401	33.73
Natural Law	Patrice Thiessen	7,253	3.04
Libertarian	William Brunner	5,759	2.42
No party	Bob Todd (write-in)	7	0.00
Invalid or blank votes		15,260	6.02
Total votes		253,593	100.00
Turnout			
Republican hold			

=== District 3 ===
California's 3rd congressional district election, 1996
Party	Candidate	Votes	%
Democratic	Vic Fazio (incumbent)	118,663	53.52
Republican	Tim Lefever	91,134	41.10
Reform	Timothy Erich	7,701	3.47
Libertarian	Erin Donelle	4,239	1.91
Invalid or blank votes		11,887	5.09
Total votes		233,624	100.00
Turnout			
Democratic hold			

=== District 4 ===
California's 4th congressional district election, 1996
Party	Candidate	Votes	%
Republican	John Doolittle (incumbent)	164,048	60.46
Democratic	Katie Hirning	97,948	36.10
Libertarian	Patrick McHargue	9,319	3.43
Invalid or blank votes		17,386	6.02
Total votes		288,701	100.00
Turnout			
Republican hold			

=== District 5 ===
California's 5th congressional district election, 1996
Party	Candidate	Votes	%
Democratic	Robert Matsui (incumbent)	142,618	70.44
Republican	Robert Dinsmore	52,940	26.15
Libertarian	Joseph Miller	2,548	1.26
American Independent	Gordon Mors	2,231	1.10
Natural Law	Charles Kersey	2,123	1.05
Invalid or blank votes		12,301	5.73
Total votes		214,761	100.00
Turnout			
Democratic hold			

=== District 6 ===
California's 6th congressional district election, 1996
Party	Candidate	Votes	%
Democratic	Lynn Woolsey (incumbent)	156,958	61.83
Republican	Duane Hughes	86,278	33.99
Peace and Freedom	Ernest Jones	6,459	2.54
Natural Law	Bruce Kendall	4,141	1.63
Invalid or blank votes		22,736	8.22
Total votes		276,572	100.00
Turnout			
Democratic hold			

=== District 7 ===
California's 7th congressional district election, 1996
Party	Candidate	Votes	%
Democratic	George Miller (incumbent)	137,089	71.81
Republican	Norman Reece	42,542	22.28
Reform	William Thompson	6,866	3.60
Natural Law	Bob Liatunick	4,420	2.32
Invalid or blank votes		13,179	6.46
Total votes		204,096	100.00
Turnout			
Democratic hold			

=== District 8 ===
California's 8th congressional district election, 1996
Party	Candidate	Votes	%
Democratic	Nancy Pelosi (incumbent)	175,216	84.34
Republican	Justin Raimondo	25,739	12.39
Natural Law	David Smithstein	6,783	3.26
No party	Ed Murray (write-in)	22	0.01
Invalid or blank votes		24,797	10.66
Total votes		232,557	100.00
Turnout			
Democratic hold			

=== District 9 ===
California's 9th congressional district election, 1996
Party	Candidate	Votes	%
Democratic	Ronald Dellums (incumbent)	154,806	77.03
Republican	Deborah Wright	37,126	18.47
Peace and Freedom	Tom Condit	5,561	2.77
Natural Law	Jack Forem	3,475	1.73
No party	Omari Musa (write-in)	8	0.00
Invalid or blank votes		13,712	6.39
Total votes		214,688	100.00
Turnout			
Democratic hold			

=== District 10 ===
California's 10th congressional district election, 1996
Party	Candidate	Votes	%
Democratic	Ellen Tauscher	137,726	48.63
Republican	Bill Baker (incumbent)	133,633	47.19
Reform	John Place	6,354	2.24
Natural Law	Valerie Janlois	3,047	1.08
Libertarian	Gregory Lyon	2,423	0.86
Invalid or blank votes		7,504	2.58
Total votes		290,687	100.00
Turnout			
Democratic gain from Republican			

=== District 11 ===
California's 11th congressional district election, 1996
Party	Candidate	Votes	%
Republican	Richard Pombo (incumbent)	107,477	59.35
Democratic	Jason Silva	65,536	36.19
Libertarian	Kelly Rego	5,077	2.80
Natural Law	Selene Bush	3,006	1.66
Invalid or blank votes		6,522	3.48
Total votes		187,618	100.00
Turnout			
Republican hold			

=== District 12 ===
California's 12th congressional district election, 1996
Party	Candidate	Votes	%
Democratic	Tom Lantos (incumbent)	149,052	71.69
Republican	Storm Jenkins	49,278	23.70
Libertarian	Christopher Schmidt	6,111	2.94
Natural Law	Richard Borg	3,472	1.67
Invalid or blank votes		17,306	7.68
Total votes		225,219	100.00
Turnout			
Democratic hold			

=== District 13 ===
California's 13th congressional district election, 1996
Party	Candidate	Votes	%
Democratic	Pete Stark (incumbent)	114,408	65.18
Republican	James Fay	53,385	30.41
Libertarian	Terry Savage	7,746	4.41
Invalid or blank votes		14,620	7.65
Total votes		191,159	100.00
Turnout			
Democratic hold			

=== District 14 ===
California's 14th congressional district election, 1996
Party	Candidate	Votes	%
Democratic	Anna Eshoo (incumbent)	149,313	64.87
Republican	Ben Brink	71,573	31.10
Peace and Freedom	Timothy Thompson	3,653	1.59
Libertarian	Joseph Dehn	3,492	1.52
Natural Law	Robert Wells	2,144	0.93
Invalid or blank votes		11,814	4.88
Total votes		241,989	100.00
Turnout			
Democratic hold			

=== District 15 ===
California's 15th congressional district election, 1996
Party	Candidate	Votes	%
Republican	Tom Campbell (incumbent)	132,737	58.50
Democratic	Dick Lane	79,048	34.84
Reform	Valli Sharpe-Geisler	6,230	2.75
Libertarian	Ed Wimmers	5,481	2.42
Natural Law	Bruce Currivan	3,372	1.49
No party	Linh Dao (write-in)	9	0.00
No party	Conner Vlakancic (write-in)	9	0.00
Invalid or blank votes		16,275	6.69
Total votes		243,161	100.00
Turnout			
Republican hold			

=== District 16 ===
California's 16th congressional district election, 1996
Party	Candidate	Votes	%
Democratic	Zoe Lofgren (incumbent)	94,020	65.65
Republican	Chuck Wojslaw	43,197	30.16
Libertarian	David Bonino	4,124	2.88
Natural Law	Abaan Abu-Shumays	1,866	1.30
Invalid or blank votes		10,572	6.87
Total votes		153,779	100.00
Turnout			
Democratic hold			

=== District 17 ===
California's 17th congressional district election, 1996
Party	Candidate	Votes	%
Democratic	Sam Farr (incumbent)	115,116	58.87
Republican	Jess Brown	73,856	37.77
Natural Law	John Black	6,573	3.36
Invalid or blank votes		6,812	3.37
Total votes		202,357	100.00
Turnout			
Democratic hold			

=== District 18 ===
California's 18th congressional district election, 1996
Party	Candidate	Votes	%
Democratic	Gary Condit (incumbent)	108,827	65.72
Republican	Bill Conrad	52,695	31.82
Libertarian	James Morzella	2,233	1.35
Natural Law	Page Riskin	1,831	1.11
Invalid or blank votes		8,304	4.78
Total votes		173,890	100.00
Turnout			
Democratic hold			

=== District 19 ===
California's 19th congressional district election, 1996
Party	Candidate	Votes	%
Republican	George Radanovich (incumbent)	137,402	66.58
Democratic	Paul Barile	58,452	28.32
Libertarian	Pamela Pescosolido	6,083	2.95
Natural Law	David Adalian	4,442	2.15
Invalid or blank votes		15,110	6.82
Total votes		221,489	100.00
Turnout			
Republican hold			

=== District 20 ===
California's 20th congressional district election, 1996
Party	Candidate	Votes	%
Democratic	Cal Dooley (incumbent)	65,381	56.51
Republican	Trice Harvey	45,276	39.13
Libertarian	Jonathan Richter	5,048	4.36
Invalid or blank votes		6,966	5.68
Total votes		122,671	100.00
Turnout			
Democratic hold			

=== District 21 ===
California's 21st congressional district election, 1996
Party	Candidate	Votes	%
Republican	Bill Thomas (incumbent)	125,916	65.81
Democratic	Deborah Vollmer	50,694	26.50
Reform	John Evans	8,113	4.24
Natural Law	Jane Bialosky	3,380	1.77
Libertarian	Mike Hodges	3,049	1.59
No party	Karen Gentry (write-in)	172	0.09
Invalid or blank votes		5,852	2.97
Total votes		197,176	100.00
Turnout			
Republican hold			

=== District 22 ===
California's 22nd congressional district election, 1996
Party	Candidate	Votes	%
Democratic	Walter Capps	118,299	48.45
Republican	Andrea Seastrand (incumbent)	107,987	44.22
Independent	Steven Wheeler	9,845	4.03
Reform	Richard Porter	3,975	1.63
Libertarian	David Bersohn	2,233	0.91
Natural Law	Dawn Tomastik	1,847	0.76
Invalid or blank votes		5,569	2.23
Total votes		249,755	100.00
Turnout			
Democratic gain from Republican			

=== District 23 ===
California's 23rd congressional district election, 1996
Party	Candidate	Votes	%
Republican	Elton Gallegly (incumbent)	118,880	59.59
Democratic	Robert Unruhe	70,035	35.10
Libertarian	Gail Lightfoot	8,346	4.18
Natural Law	Stephen Hospodar	2,246	1.13
Invalid or blank votes		7,198	3.48
Total votes		206,705	100.00
Turnout			
Republican hold			

=== District 24 ===
California's 24th congressional district election, 1996
Party	Candidate	Votes	%
Democratic	Brad Sherman	106,193	49.43
Republican	Rich Sybert	93,629	43.58
Peace and Freedom	Ralph Shroyer	6,267	2.92
Libertarian	Erich Miller	5,691	2.65
Natural Law	Ron Lawrence	3,068	1.43
Invalid or blank votes		16,957	7.32
Total votes		231,805	100.00
Turnout			
Democratic hold			

=== District 25 ===
California's 25th congressional district election, 1996
Party	Candidate	Votes	%
Republican	Howard McKeon (incumbent)	122,428	62.40
Democratic	Diane Trautman	65,089	33.17
Libertarian	Bruce Acker	6,173	3.15
Peace and Freedom	Justin Gerber	2,513	1.28
Invalid or blank votes		14,280	6.78
Total votes		210,483	100.00
Turnout			
Republican hold			

=== District 26 ===
California's 26th congressional district election, 1996
Party	Candidate	Votes	%
Democratic	Howard Berman (incumbent)	67,525	65.87
Republican	Bill Glass	29,332	28.61
Libertarian	Scott Fritschler	3,539	3.45
Natural Law	Gary Hearne	2,119	2.07
Invalid or blank votes		11,530	10.11
Total votes		114,045	100.00
Turnout			
Democratic hold			

=== District 27 ===
California's 27th congressional district election, 1996
Party	Candidate	Votes	%
Republican	Jim Rogan	95,310	50.18
Democratic	Doug Kahn	82,014	43.18
Libertarian	Elizabeth Michael	6,645	3.50
Green	Walt Sheasby	4,195	2.21
Natural Law	Martin Zucker	1,766	0.93
Invalid or blank votes		16,419	7.96
Total votes		206,349	100.00
Turnout			
Republican hold			

=== District 28 ===
California's 28th congressional district election, 1996
Party	Candidate	Votes	%
Republican	David Dreier (incumbent)	113,389	60.67
Democratic	David Levering	69,037	36.94
Libertarian	Ken Saurenman	4,459	2.39
Invalid or blank votes		15,619	7.71
Total votes		202,504	100.00
Turnout			
Republican hold			

=== District 29 ===
California's 29th congressional district election, 1996
Party	Candidate	Votes	%
Democratic	Henry Waxman (incumbent)	145,278	67.62
Republican	Paul Stepanek	52,857	24.60
Peace and Freedom	John Daly	8,819	4.10
Libertarian	Mike Binkley	4,766	2.22
Natural Law	Brian Rees	3,097	1.44
Invalid or blank votes		19,378	8.27
Total votes		234,195	100.00
Turnout			
Democratic hold			

=== District 30 ===
California's 30th congressional district election, 1996
Party	Candidate	Votes	%
Democratic	Xavier Becerra (incumbent)	58,283	72.32
Republican	Patricia Parker	15,078	18.71
Libertarian	Pam Probst	2,759	3.42
Peace and Freedom	Shirley Mandel	2,499	3.10
Natural Law	Rosemary Watson-Frith	1,971	2.45
Invalid or blank votes		10,199	11.23
Total votes		90,789	100.00
Turnout			
Democratic hold			

=== District 31 ===
California's 31st congressional district election, 1996
Party	Candidate	Votes	%
Democratic	Matthew G. Martinez (incumbent)	69,285	67.47
Republican	John Flores	28,705	27.95
Libertarian	Michael Everling	4,700	4.58
Invalid or blank votes		10,855	9.56
Total votes		113,545	100.00
Turnout			
Democratic hold			

=== District 32 ===
California's 32nd congressional district election, 1996
Party	Candidate	Votes	%
Democratic	Julian C. Dixon (incumbent)	124,712	82.36
Republican	Larry Ardito	18,768	12.39
Libertarian	Neal Donner	6,390	4.22
Natural Law	Rashied Jibri	1,557	1.03
Invalid or blank votes		17,257	10.23
Total votes		168,684	100.00
Turnout			
Democratic hold			

=== District 33 ===
California's 33rd congressional district election, 1996
Party	Candidate	Votes	%
Democratic	Lucille Roybal-Allard (incumbent)	47,478	82.10
Republican	John Leonard	8,147	14.09
Libertarian	Howard Johnson	2,203	3.81
Invalid or blank votes		6,638	10.30
Total votes		64,466	100.00
Turnout			
Democratic hold			

=== District 34 ===
California's 34th congressional district election, 1996
Party	Candidate	Votes	%
Democratic	Esteban Torres (incumbent)	94,730	68.43
Republican	David Nunez	36,852	26.62
American Independent	J. Scott	4,122	2.98
Libertarian	David Argall	2,736	1.98
Invalid or blank votes		11,697	7.79
Total votes		150,137	100.00
Turnout			
Democratic hold			

=== District 35 ===
California's 35th congressional district election, 1996
Party	Candidate	Votes	%
Democratic	Maxine Waters (incumbent)	92,762	85.50
Republican	Eric Carlson	13,116	12.09
American Independent	Gordon Mego	2,610	2.41
Invalid or blank votes		8,237	7.06
Total votes		116,725	100.00
Turnout			
Democratic hold			

=== District 36 ===
California's 36th congressional district election, 1996
Party	Candidate	Votes	%
Democratic	Jane Harman (incumbent)	117,752	52.46
Republican	Susan Brooks	98,538	43.90
Libertarian	Bruce Dovner	4,933	2.20
Natural Law	Bradley McManus	3,236	1.44
Invalid or blank votes		16,463	6.83
Total votes		240,922	100.00
Turnout			
Democratic hold			

=== District 37 ===
California's 37th congressional district election, 1996
Party	Candidate	Votes	%
Democratic	Juanita Millender-McDonald (inc.)	87,247	85.05
Republican	Michael Voetee	15,339	14.95
Invalid or blank votes		12,482	10.85
Total votes		115,068	100.00
Turnout			
Democratic hold			

=== District 38 ===
California's 38th congressional district election, 1996
Party	Candidate	Votes	%
Republican	Steve Horn (incumbent)	88,136	52.57
Democratic	Rick Zbur	71,627	42.73
Green	William Yeager	4,610	2.75
Libertarian	Paul Gautreau	3,272	1.95
Invalid or blank votes		13,733	7.56
Total votes		209,278	100.00
Turnout			
Republican hold			

=== District 39 ===
California's 39th congressional district election, 1996
Party	Candidate	Votes	%
Republican	Ed Royce (incumbent)	120,761	62.80
Democratic	R. Davis	61,392	31.93
Libertarian	Jack Dean	10,137	5.27
Invalid or blank votes		12,928	6.30
Total votes		205,218	100.00
Turnout			
Republican hold			

=== District 40 ===
California's 40th congressional district election, 1996
Party	Candidate	Votes	%
Republican	Jerry Lewis (incumbent)	98,821	64.90
Democratic	Robert Conaway	44,102	28.96
American Independent	Hale McGee	4,963	3.26
Libertarian	Joseph Kelley	4,375	2.87
Invalid or blank votes		47,258	26.32
Total votes		179,519	100.00
Turnout			
Republican hold			

=== District 41 ===
California's 41st congressional district election, 1996
Party	Candidate	Votes	%
Republican	Jay Kim (incumbent)	83,934	58.46
Democratic	Richard Waldron	47,346	32.98
Libertarian	Richard Newhouse	7,135	4.97
Natural Law	David Kramer	5,030	3.50
No party	Marjorie Mikels (Write-in)	120	0.08
Invalid or blank votes		25,666	15.17
Total votes		169,231	100.00
Turnout			
Republican hold			

=== District 42 ===
California's 42nd congressional district election, 1996
Party	Candidate	Votes	%
Democratic	George Brown, Jr. (incumbent)	52,166	50.48
Republican	Linda Wilde	51,170	49.52
Invalid or blank votes		44,596	30.15
Total votes		147,932	100.00
Turnout			
Democratic hold			

=== District 43 ===
California's 43rd congressional district election, 1996
Party	Candidate	Votes	%
Republican	Ken Calvert (incumbent)	97,247	54.72
Democratic	Guy Kimborough	67,422	37.94
Natural Law	Annie Wallack	6,576	3.70
Peace and Freedom	Kevin Akin	3,309	1.86
Libertarian	Gene Berkman	3,086	1.74
No party	Colleen Cummings (write-in)	84	0.05
Invalid or blank votes		6,571	3.57
Total votes		184,295	100.00
Turnout			
Republican hold			

=== District 44 ===
California's 44th congressional district election, 1996
Party	Candidate	Votes	%
Republican	Sonny Bono (incumbent)	110,643	57.74
Democratic	Anita Rufus	73,844	38.54
American Independent	Donald Cochran	3,888	2.03
Natural Law	Karen Wilkinson	3,143	1.64
No party	Bud Mathewson (write-in)	110	0.05
Invalid or blank votes		4,245	2.17
Total votes		195,873	100.00
Turnout			
Republican hold			

=== District 45 ===
California's 45th congressional district election, 1996
Party	Candidate	Votes	%
Republican	Dana Rohrabacher (incumbent)	125,326	60.98
Democratic	Sally Alexander	68,312	33.24
Libertarian	Mark Murphy	8,813	4.29
Natural Law	Rand McDevitt	3,071	1.49
Invalid or blank votes		11,113	5.13
Total votes		216,635	100.00
Turnout			
Republican hold			

=== District 46 ===
This election was unsuccessfully challenged by Dornan due to electoral fraud allegations.

California's 46th congressional district election, 1996
Party	Candidate	Votes	%
Democratic	Loretta Sanchez	47,964	46.80
Republican	Bob Dornan (incumbent)	46,980	45.84
Reform	Lawrence Stafford	3,235	3.16
Libertarian	Thomas Reimer	2,333	2.28
Natural Law	J. Aguirre	1,972	1.92
Invalid or blank votes		3,771	3.55
Total votes		106,255	100.00
Turnout			
Democratic gain from Republican			

=== District 47 ===
California's 47th congressional district election, 1996
Party	Candidate	Votes	%
Republican	Christopher Cox (incumbent)	160,078	65.73
Democratic	Tina Laine	70,362	28.89
Natural Law	Iris Adam	6,573	2.70
Libertarian	Victor Wagner	6,530	2.68
Invalid or blank votes		12,574	4.90
Total votes		256,351	100.00
Turnout			
Republican hold			

=== District 48 ===
California's 48th congressional district election, 1996
Party	Candidate	Votes	%
Republican	Ron Packard (incumbent)	145,814	65.86
Democratic	Dan Farrell	59,558	26.90
Reform	William Dreu	8,013	3.62
Natural Law	Sharon Miles	8,006	3.62
Invalid or blank votes		20,545	8.49
Total votes		241,936	100.00
Turnout			
Republican hold			

=== District 49 ===
California's 49th congressional district election, 1996
Party	Candidate	Votes	%
Republican	Brian Bilbray (incumbent)	108,806	52.62
Democratic	Peter Navarro	86,657	41.91
Libertarian	Ernie Lippe	4,218	2.04
Reform	Kevin Hambsch	3,773	1.82
Natural Law	Peter Sterling	3,314	1.60
Invalid or blank votes		25,565	11.00
Total votes		232,333	100.00
Turnout			
Republican hold			

=== District 50 ===
California's 50th congressional district election, 1996
Party	Candidate	Votes	%
Democratic	Bob Filner (incumbent)	73,200	59.62
Republican	Jim Baize	38,351	31.24
Natural Law	Earl Shepard	2,138	1.81
Reform	Dan Clark	3,253	2.65
Libertarian	Philip Zoebisch	1,398	1.14
Invalid or blank votes		18,845	13.74
Total votes		118,240	100.00
Turnout			
Democratic hold			

=== District 51 ===
California's 51st congressional district election, 1996
Party	Candidate	Votes	%
Republican	Duke Cunningham (incumbent)	149,032	65.07
Democratic	Rita Tamerius	66,250	28.93
Peace and Freedom	Miriam Clark	5,407	2.36
Libertarian	J.C. Anderson	5,298	2.31
Natural Law	Eric Bourdette	3,037	1.33
Invalid or blank votes		29,484	12.05
Total votes		244,766	100.00
Turnout			
Republican hold			

=== District 52 ===
California's 52nd congressional district election, 1996
Party	Candidate	Votes	%
Republican	Duncan Hunter (incumbent)	116,746	65.47
Democratic	Darity Wesley	53,104	29.78
Peace and Freedom	Janice Jordan	3,649	2.05
Libertarian	Dante Ridley	3,329	1.87
Natural Law	Peter Ballantyne	1,493	0.84
Invalid or blank votes		24,825	12.22
Total votes		203,146	100.00
Turnout			
Republican hold			

== See also ==
- 105th United States Congress
- Political party strength in California
- Political party strength in U.S. states
- 1996 United States House of Representatives elections
