= 1994 United States House of Representatives elections in California =

- November 8, 1994

All 52 California seats to the United States House of Representatives
	Majority party	Minority party
Party	Democratic	Republican
Last election	30	22
Seats won	27	25
Seat change	▼3	▲3
Popular vote	3,969,864	4,071,280
Percentage	47.57%	48.78%
- Results: Democratic hold Republican hold Republican gain

The United States House of Representatives elections in California, 1994 was an election for California's delegation to the United States House of Representatives, which occurred as part of the general election of the House of Representatives on November 8, 1994. As in much of the country during the Republican Revolution, Republicans made gains in California's House delegation, gaining three seats. In a December 12, 1995, special election former Rep. Tom Campbell won Rep. Norman Mineta's old seat and tied the delegation at 26 seats a piece. This would be the last time that Republicans defeated an incumbent Democrat in a general election in California until 2020. As of 2026 this is the last time Republicans won the house popular vote in California.

== Overview ==
United States House of Representatives elections in California, 1994
Party	Votes	%	Before	After	Special	+/–
Republican	4,071,280	48.78%	22	25	26	+4
Democratic	3,969,864	47.57%	30	27	26	-4
Libertarian	187,987	2.25%	0	0	0	0
Peace and Freedom	54,907	0.66%	0	0	0	0
American Independent	39,291	0.47%	0	0	0	0
Green	12,002	0.14%	0	0	0	0
Reform	8,543	0.10%	0	0	0	0
Write-ins	1,826	0.02%	0	0	0	0
Invalid or blank votes	565,838	6.35%	—	—	—	—
Totals	8,911,538	100.00%	52	52	52	—

== Results ==
Final results from the Secretary of State of California:

=== District 1 ===
California's 1st congressional district election, 1994
Party	Candidate	Votes	%
Republican	Frank Riggs	106,870	53.26
Democratic	Dan Hamburg (incumbent)	93,717	46.70
No party	Russel J. Chase (write-in)	86	0.04
Invalid or blank votes		10,997	5.20
Total votes		211,570	100.00
Turnout			
Republican gain from Democratic			

=== District 2 ===
California's 2nd congressional district election, 1994
Party	Candidate	Votes	%
Republican	Wally Herger (incumbent)	137,864	64.16
Democratic	Mary Jacobs	55,959	26.04
American Independent	Devvy Kidd	15,619	7.27
Libertarian	Harry H. "Doc" Pendery	5,418	2.52
Invalid or blank votes		8,355	3.74
Total votes		223,215	100.00
Turnout			
Republican hold			

=== District 3 ===
California's 3rd congressional district election, 1994
Party	Candidate	Votes	%
Democratic	Vic Fazio (incumbent)	97,093	49.75
Republican	Tim Lefever	89,964	46.10
Libertarian	Ross Crain	8,100	4.15
Invalid or blank votes		8,698	4.27
Total votes		203,855	100.00
Turnout			
Democratic hold			

=== District 4 ===
California's 4th congressional district election, 1994
Party	Candidate	Votes	%
Republican	John Doolittle (incumbent)	144,936	61.33
Democratic	Katie Hirning	82,505	34.91
Libertarian	Damon C. Falconi	8,882	3.76
Invalid or blank votes		11,055	4.47
Total votes		247,378	100.00
Turnout			
Republican hold			

=== District 5 ===
California's 5th congressional district election, 1994
Party	Candidate	Votes	%
Democratic	Robert Matsui (incumbent)	125,042	68.48
Republican	Robert S. Dinsmore	52,905	28.97
American Independent	Gordon Mors	4,649	2.55
Invalid or blank votes		9,762	5.07
Total votes		192,358	100.00
Turnout			
Democratic hold			

=== District 6 ===
California's 6th congressional district election, 1994
Party	Candidate	Votes	%
Democratic	Lynn Woolsey (incumbent)	137,642	58.12
Republican	Michael J. Nugent	88,940	37.55
Libertarian	Louis Beary	6,203	2.62
Peace and Freedom	Ernest K. Jones, Jr.	4,055	1.71
Invalid or blank votes		13,092	5.24
Total votes		249,932	100.00
Turnout			
Democratic hold			

=== District 7 ===
California's 7th congressional district election, 1994
Party	Candidate	Votes	%
Democratic	George Miller (incumbent)	116,015	69.69
Republican	Charles V. Hughes	45,698	27.43
Peace and Freedom	William A. "Bill" Callison	4,798	2.88
Invalid or blank votes		9,219	5.24
Total votes		175,820	100.00
Turnout			
Democratic hold			

=== District 8 ===
California's 8th congressional district election, 1994
Party	Candidate	Votes	%
Democratic	Nancy Pelosi (incumbent)	137,642	81.85
Republican	Elsa C. Cheung	30,528	18.15
No party	Robert Bowman (write-in)	1	0.00
Invalid or blank votes		22,040	11.59
Total votes		190,211	100.00
Turnout			
Democratic hold			

=== District 9 ===
California's 9th congressional district election, 1994
Party	Candidate	Votes	%
Democratic	Ronald Dellums (incumbent)	129,233	72.25
Republican	Deborah Wright	40,448	22.61
Peace and Freedom	Emma Wong Mar	9,194	5.14
Invalid or blank votes		13,337	6.94
Total votes		192,212	100.00
Turnout			
Democratic hold			

=== District 10 ===
California's 10th congressional district election, 1994
Party	Candidate	Votes	%
Republican	Bill Baker (incumbent)	138,916	59.30
Democratic	Ellen Schwartz	90,523	38.65
Peace and Freedom	Craig W. Cooper	4,802	2.05
Invalid or blank votes		12,637	5.12
Total votes		246,878	100.00
Turnout			
Republican hold			

=== District 11 ===
California's 11th congressional district election, 1994
Party	Candidate	Votes	%
Republican	Richard Pombo (incumbent)	99,302	62.14
Democratic	Randy A. Perry	55,794	34.91
Libertarian	Joseph B. Miller	4,718	2.95
Invalid or blank votes		7,372	4.41
Total votes		167,186	100.00
Turnout			
Republican hold			

=== District 12 ===
California's 12th congressional district election, 1994
Party	Candidate	Votes	%
Democratic	Tom Lantos (incumbent)	118,408	67.42
Republican	Deborah Wilder	57,228	32.58
Invalid or blank votes		18,689	9.62
Total votes		194,325	100.00
Turnout			
Democratic hold			

=== District 13 ===
California's 13th congressional district election, 1994
Party	Candidate	Votes	%
Democratic	Pete Stark (incumbent)	97,344	64.62
Republican	Larry Molton	45,555	30.24
Libertarian	Robert "Bob" Gough	7,743	5.14
Invalid or blank votes		12,735	7.79
Total votes		163,377	100.00
Turnout			
Democratic hold			

=== District 14 ===
California's 14th congressional district election, 1994
Party	Candidate	Votes	%
Democratic	Anna Eshoo (incumbent)	130,713	60.60
Republican	Ben Brink	78,475	39.40
Invalid or blank votes		14,865	6.94
Total votes		214,053	100.00
Turnout			
Democratic hold			

=== District 15 ===
California's 15th congressional district election, 1994
Party	Candidate	Votes	%
Democratic	Norm Mineta (incumbent)	119,921	59.90
Republican	Robert Wick	80,266	40.09
No party	Doris F. Liu (write-in)	17	0.01
Invalid or blank votes		14,129	6.59
Total votes		214,333	100.00
Turnout			
Democratic hold			

=== District 16 ===
California's 16th congressional district election, 1994
Party	Candidate	Votes	%
Democratic	Zoe Lofgren	74,935	64.96
Republican	Lyle J. Smith	40,409	35.03
No party	Fred Luke Barraza (write-in)	8	0.01
Invalid or blank votes		11,673	9.19
Total votes		127,025	100.00
Turnout			
Democratic hold			

=== District 17 ===
California's 17th congressional district election, 1994
Party	Candidate	Votes	%
Democratic	Sam Farr (incumbent)	87,222	52.17
Republican	Bill McCampbell	74,830	44.49
Green	E. Craig Coffin	5,591	3.34
Invalid or blank votes		7,816	4.47
Total votes		175,009	100.00
Turnout			
Democratic hold			

=== District 18 ===
California's 18th congressional district election, 1994
Party	Candidate	Votes	%
Democratic	Gary Condit (incumbent)	91,106	65.52
Republican	Tom Carter	44,046	31.68
Libertarian	James B. Morzella	3,902	2.81
Invalid or blank votes		8,494	5.76
Total votes		147,548	100.00
Turnout			
Democratic hold			

=== District 19 ===
California's 19th congressional district election, 1994
Party	Candidate	Votes	%
Republican	George Radanovich	104,435	56.78
Democratic	Richard Lehman (incumbent)	72,912	39.64
Libertarian	Dolores Comstock	6,579	3.58
Invalid or blank votes		8,081	4.21
Total votes		192,007	100.00
Turnout			
Republican gain from Democratic			

=== District 20 ===
California's 20th congressional district election, 1994
Party	Candidate	Votes	%
Democratic	Cal Dooley (incumbent)	57,394	56.70
Republican	Paul Young	43,836	43.30
Invalid or blank votes		7,127	6.58
Total votes		108,357	100.00
Turnout			
Democratic hold			

=== District 21 ===
California's 21st congressional district election, 1994
Party	Candidate	Votes	%
Republican	Bill Thomas (incumbent)	116,874	68.10
Democratic	John L. Evans	47,517	27.69
Libertarian	Mike Hodges	6,899	4.02
No party	Deborah A. Vollmer (write-in)	339	0.20
Invalid or blank votes		6,167	3.47
Total votes		177,796	100.00
Turnout			
Republican hold			

=== District 22 ===
California's 22nd congressional district election, 1994
Party	Candidate	Votes	%
Republican	Andrea Seastrand	102,987	49.27
Democratic	Walter Capps	101,424	48.53
Libertarian	David L. Bersohn	4,597	2.20
Invalid or blank votes		8,509	3.91
Total votes		217,517	100.00
Turnout			
Republican hold			

=== District 23 ===
California's 23rd congressional district election, 1994
Party	Candidate	Votes	%
Republican	Elton Gallegly (incumbent)	114,043	66.17
Democratic	Kevin Ready	47,345	27.47
Libertarian	Bill Brown	6,481	3.76
Green	Robert T. Marston	4,457	2.59
No party	Mark Nagode (write-in)	14	0.01
Invalid or blank votes		7,894	4.38
Total votes		180,234	100.00
Turnout			
Republican hold			

=== District 24 ===
California's 24th congressional district election, 1994
Party	Candidate	Votes	%
Democratic	Anthony C. Beilenson (incumbent)	95,342	49.35
Republican	Rich Sybert	91,806	47.52
Libertarian	John C. Koehler	6,031	3.12
Invalid or blank votes		13,331	6.46
Total votes		206,510	100.00
Turnout			
Democratic hold			

=== District 25 ===
California's 25th congressional district election, 1994
Party	Candidate	Votes	%
Republican	Howard McKeon (incumbent)	110,301	64.89
Democratic	James H. Gilmartin	53,445	31.44
Libertarian	Devin Cutler	6,205	3.65
No party	Sandra F. Tulley (write-in)	20	0.01
Invalid or blank votes		13,105	7.16
Total votes		183,076	100.00
Turnout			
Republican hold			

=== District 26 ===
California's 26th congressional district election, 1994
Party	Candidate	Votes	%
Democratic	Howard Berman (incumbent)	55,145	62.57
Republican	Gary E. Forsch	28,423	32.25
Libertarian	Erich D. Miller	4,570	5.19
Invalid or blank votes		8,963	9.23
Total votes		97,101	100.00
Turnout			
Democratic hold			

=== District 27 ===
California's 27th congressional district election, 1994
Party	Candidate	Votes	%
Republican	Carlos J. Moorhead (incumbent)	88,341	52.97
Democratic	Doug Kahn	70,267	42.13
American Independent	Bill Gibbs	4,328	2.60
Libertarian	Dennis Decherd	3,838	2.30
Invalid or blank votes		13,123	7.29
Total votes		179,897	100.00
Turnout			
Republican hold			

=== District 28 ===
California's 28th congressional district election, 1994
Party	Candidate	Votes	%
Republican	David Dreier (incumbent)	110,179	67.07
Democratic	Tommy Randle	50,022	30.45
Libertarian	Jorj Clayton Baker	4,069	2.48
No party	Barry L. Hatch (write-in)	7	0.00
Invalid or blank votes		12,928	7.30
Total votes		177,205	100.00
Turnout			
Republican hold			

=== District 29 ===
California's 29th congressional district election, 1994
Party	Candidate	Votes	%
Democratic	Henry Waxman (incumbent)	129,413	66.15
Republican	Paul Stepanek	53,801	28.26
Libertarian	Mike Binkley	7,162	3.76
Invalid or blank votes		17,339	8.35
Total votes		207,715	100.00
Turnout			
Democratic hold			

=== District 30 ===
California's 30th congressional district election, 1994
Party	Candidate	Votes	%
Democratic	Xavier Becerra (incumbent)	43,943	66.15
Republican	David A. Ramirez	18,741	28.21
Libertarian	R. William Weilberg	3,741	5.63
Invalid or blank votes		7,499	10.14
Total votes		73,924	100.00
Turnout			
Democratic hold			

=== District 31 ===
California's 31st congressional district election, 1994
Party	Candidate	Votes	%
Democratic	Matthew G. Martinez (incumbent)	50,541	59.14
Republican	John V. Flores	34,926	40.86
Invalid or blank votes		8,886	9.42
Total votes		94,353	100.00
Turnout			
Democratic hold			

=== District 32 ===
California's 32nd congressional district election, 1994
Party	Candidate	Votes	%
Democratic	Julian C. Dixon (incumbent)	98,017	77.60
Republican	Ernie A. Farhat	22,190	17.57
Peace and Freedom	John Honigsfeld	6,099	4.83
Invalid or blank votes		15,594	10.99
Total votes		141,900	100.00
Turnout			
Democratic hold			

=== District 33 ===
California's 33rd congressional district election, 1994
Party	Candidate	Votes	%
Democratic	Lucille Roybal-Allard (incumbent)	33,814	81.46
Peace and Freedom	Kermit Booker	7,694	18.54
Invalid or blank votes		6,130	12.87
Total votes		47,638	100.00
Turnout			
Democratic hold			

=== District 34 ===
California's 34th congressional district election, 1994
Party	Candidate	Votes	%
Democratic	Esteban Torres (incumbent)	72,439	61.67
Republican	Albert J. Nunez	40,068	34.11
Libertarian	Carl M. "Marty" Swinney	4,921	4.19
No party	James W. Scott (write-in)	27	0.02
Invalid or blank votes		10,670	8.33
Total votes		128,125	100.00
Turnout			
Democratic hold			

=== District 35 ===
California's 35th congressional district election, 1994
Party	Candidate	Votes	%
Democratic	Maxine Waters (incumbent)	65,688	78.12
Republican	Nate Truman	18,930	21.87
No party	Gordon Michael Mego (write-in)	3	0.00
Invalid or blank votes		9,589	10.24
Total votes		94,210	100.00
Turnout			
Democratic hold			

=== District 36 ===
California's 36th congressional district election, 1994
Party	Candidate	Votes	%
Democratic	Jane Harman (incumbent)	93,939	47.98
Republican	Susan Brooks	93,127	47.56
Libertarian	Jack Tyler	4,932	2.52
American Independent	Joseph J. "Joe" Fields	3,810	1.95
Invalid or blank votes		14,355	6.83
Total votes		210,163	100.00
Turnout			
Democratic hold			

=== District 37 ===
California's 37th congressional district election, 1994
Party	Candidate	Votes	%
Democratic	Walter Tucker (incumbent)	64,166	77.37
Libertarian	Guy Wilson	18,502	22.31
No party	Lewis B. Prulitsky (write-in)	263	0.32
Invalid or blank votes		11,353	12.04
Total votes		94,284	100.00
Turnout			
Democratic hold			

=== District 38 ===
California's 38th congressional district election, 1994
Party	Candidate	Votes	%
Republican	Steve Horn (incumbent)	85,225	58.47
Democratic	Peter Mathews	53,681	36.83
Libertarian	Lester W. Mueller	3,795	2.60
Peace and Freedom	Richard K. Green	2,995	2.05
No party	John Duke (write-in)	73	0.05
Invalid or blank votes		12,186	7.71
Total votes		157,955	100.00
Turnout			
Republican hold			

=== District 39 ===
California's 39th congressional district election, 1994
Party	Candidate	Votes	%
Republican	Ed Royce (incumbent)	113,641	66.36
Democratic	R. O. "Bob" Davis	49,696	29.02
Libertarian	Jack Dean	7,907	4.62
Invalid or blank votes		11,771	6.43
Total votes		183,015	100.00
Turnout			
Republican hold			

=== District 40 ===
California's 40th congressional district election, 1994
Party	Candidate	Votes	%
Republican	Jerry Lewis (incumbent)	115,728	70.68
Democratic	Donald M. "Don" Rusk	48,003	29.32
Invalid or blank votes		10,775	6.17
Total votes		174,506	100.00
Turnout			
Republican hold			

=== District 41 ===
California's 41st congressional district election, 1994
Party	Candidate	Votes	%
Republican	Jay Kim (incumbent)	82,100	62.13
Democratic	Ed Tessier	50,043	37.87
Invalid or blank votes		11,627	8.09
Total votes		143,770	100.00
Turnout			
Republican hold			

=== District 42 ===
California's 42nd congressional district election, 1994
Party	Candidate	Votes	%
Democratic	George Brown, Jr. (incumbent)	58,888	51.12
Republican	Rob Guzman	56,259	48.83
No party	Denis LaBine (write-in)	44	0.04
No party	Manuel M. Sanchez (write-in)	14	0.01
Invalid or blank votes		8,866	7.15
Total votes		124,071	100.00
Turnout			
Democratic hold			

=== District 43 ===
California's 43rd congressional district election, 1994
Party	Candidate	Votes	%
Republican	Ken Calvert (incumbent)	84,500	54.73
Democratic	Mark A. Takano	59,342	38.44
Libertarian	Gene L. Berkman	9,636	6.24
No party	John Schwab (write-in)	767	0.50
No party	Velma Hickey (write-in)	141	0.09
Invalid or blank votes		6,421	3.99
Total votes		160,807	100.00
Turnout			
Republican hold			

=== District 44 ===
California's 44th congressional district election, 1994
Party	Candidate	Votes	%
Republican	Sonny Bono	95,521	55.61
Democratic	Steve Clute	65,370	38.06
American Independent	Donald Cochran	10,885	6.34
Invalid or blank votes		4,803	2.72
Total votes		176,579	100.00
Turnout			
Republican hold			

=== District 45 ===
California's 45th congressional district election, 1994
Party	Candidate	Votes	%
Republican	Dana Rohrabacher (incumbent)	124,875	69.10
Democratic	Brett Williamson	55,849	30.90
Invalid or blank votes		13,071	6.74
Total votes		193,795	100.00
Turnout			
Republican hold			

=== District 46 ===
California's 46th congressional district election, 1994
Party	Candidate	Votes	%
Republican	Bob Dornan (incumbent)	50,616	57.07
Democratic	Michael P. "Mike" Farber	33,004	37.21
Libertarian	Richard G. Newhouse	5,077	5.72
Invalid or blank votes		4,112	4.43
Total votes		92,809	100.00
Turnout			
Republican hold			

=== District 47 ===
California's 47th congressional district election, 1994
Party	Candidate	Votes	%
Republican	Christopher Cox (incumbent)	154,071	71.66
Democratic	Gary Kingsbury	53,669	24.96
Libertarian	Victor A. Wagner, Jr.	7,257	3.38
Invalid or blank votes		12,687	5.57
Total votes		227,684	100.00
Turnout			
Republican hold			

=== District 48 ===
California's 48th congressional district election, 1994
Party	Candidate	Votes	%
Republican	Ron Packard (incumbent)	143,570	73.39
Democratic	Andrei Leschick	43,523	22.25
Reform	Donna White	8,543	4.37
Invalid or blank votes		12,658	6.08
Total votes		208,294	100.00
Turnout			
Republican hold			

=== District 49 ===
California's 49th congressional district election, 1994
Party	Candidate	Votes	%
Republican	Brian Bilbray	90,283	48.51
Democratic	Lynn Schenk (incumbent)	85,597	45.99
Libertarian	Chris Hoogenboom	5,288	2.84
Peace and Freedom	Renate M. Kline	4,948	2.66
No party	Perry T. Thompson (write-in)	2	0
Invalid or blank votes		10,186	5.19
Total votes		196,304	100.00
Turnout			
Republican gain from Democratic			

=== District 50 ===
California's 50th congressional district election, 1994
Party	Candidate	Votes	%
Democratic	Bob Filner (incumbent)	59,214	58.90
Republican	Mary Alice Acevedo	36,955	32.50
Libertarian	Richardo Duenez	3,326	3.18
Peace and Freedom	Guillermo Ramirez	3,002	2.87
Green	Kip Krueger	1,954	1.87
Invalid or blank votes		7,108	6.37
Total votes		125,448	100.00
Turnout			
Democratic hold			

=== District 51 ===
California's 51st congressional district election, 1994
Party	Candidate	Votes	%
Republican	Duke Cunningham (incumbent)	138,547	66.93
Democratic	Rita K. Tamerius	57,374	27.72
Libertarian	Bill Holmes	6,968	3.37
Peace and Freedom	Miriam Clark	4,099	1.98
Invalid or blank votes		14,522	6.56
Total votes		221,490	100.00
Turnout			
Republican hold			

=== District 52 ===
California's 52nd congressional district election, 1994
Party	Candidate	Votes	%
Republican	Duncan Hunter (incumbent)	109,201	63.98
Democratic	Janet M. Gastil	53,024	31.07
Libertarian	Joe Shea	5,240	3.07
Peace and Freedom	Art Edelman	3,221	1.89
Invalid or blank votes		9,437	5.24
Total votes		180,123	100.00
Turnout			
Republican hold			

== See also ==
- 104th United States Congress
- Political party strength in California
- Political party strength in U.S. states
- 1994 United States House of Representatives elections
