= Gregory Cheadle =

American real estate broker

- Born: Gregory Edward Cheadle; Cleveland, Ohio
- Website: cheadleforcongress.com

Gregory Edward Cheadle is an American real estate broker and politician.

== Personal life ==
Cheadle was born in Cleveland, Ohio. He grew up in inner-city Oakland, California and Cleveland, as after his parents divorced his time was divided between Oakland where his mother was a secretary and Cleveland where his father was a shoe shiner. He moved to Redding, California in 2001. He is divorced and has three children: two daughters and one son. As of September 13, 2020, he was working on his memoir titled My African American.

== Involvement in politics ==
=== Trump rally controversy ===
On June 3, 2016, Cheadle attended a rally in Redding, California for then-presidential candidate Donald Trump. During the rally, Trump began speaking about a previous event in which an African-American Trump supporter punched a protester wearing a Ku Klux Klan outfit. While Trump was talking, Cheadle shouted "I'm here!". Trump then said "Oh, look at my African American over here. Look at him. Are you the greatest? Do you know what I'm talking about?". According to Cheadle, after the rally ended and Trump was about to leave after greeting supporters, Cheadle yelled out "Uncle Donald, Uncle Donald." Trump, who recognized Cheadle as the man he had called out, told him "You know what I was talking about? Jobs, jobs, jobs," and Cheadle responded "Yeah, jobs."

Trump's remark and use of the possessive "my" attracted criticism, with some viewing it as racist. Cheadle was also the subject of criticism, with many criticizing him for attending the rally, and friends and family leaving him angry messages "wanting to know why he let Trump insult him". According to Cheadle, his girlfriend broke up with him because of the incident, as "she was an influential Democrat and she just couldn't handle the pressure of even being seen in public with someone associated with Trump". Cheadle later clarified that he was not a Trump supporter, and said that he had previously gone to a Bernie Sanders rally, but did not go in. He said that he took Trump's comments towards him positively, but noted that many were left uncertain as to their meaning.

=== Political positions ===
Cheadle has described himself as an "1856 Republican", and has said that "the Republican party of today has left its core principles of truth, fairness, and justice". He dislikes the Affordable Care Act, and did not vote for Barack Obama, whom he has described as an "elitist". In 2016, he said that he supports decriminalizing marijuana, claiming that criminalizing the drug "has led to mass incarceration via the war on drugs". In 2016, he said on the topic of abortion that "I believe that women have the right of abortion via a convoluted Supreme Court decision, but government should not be responsible for the funding of that right"; a 2019 article in The Independent described him as anti-abortion. In 2017, he supported the NFL players who took a knee during the national anthem. In 2018, he suggested a link between vaccinations and autism.

Cheadle announced in 2019 that he was leaving the Republican Party. He described Trump as "a rich guy who is mired in white privilege to the extreme", and said he has a "white superiority complex". He also said he is now more critical of Trump's comments in the June 2016 rally, and that "today I wonder to what extent he said that for political gain or for attention." He said he didn't join the Democratic Party because he disagrees with the party's stance on gun control and its support of abortion rights. In the leadup to the 2020 United States presidential election, he was undecided on whether to vote for Trump or Joe Biden, saying, "you’re asking me to choose between projectile vomit and diarrhea." He praised Biden's vice-presidential pick, Kamala Harris, however, saying, "If I vote for Biden, it’ll probably be because I’m voting for Harris."

=== Congressional campaigns ===
Cheadle has run for Congress in California's 1st congressional district five times. He ran as a Republican in 2012, 2014, 2016, and 2018, losing in the district's primary election each time. He ran as an independent in 2020, and also lost the primary election that year.
