= Omar Navarro =

American perennial candidate and convicted felon

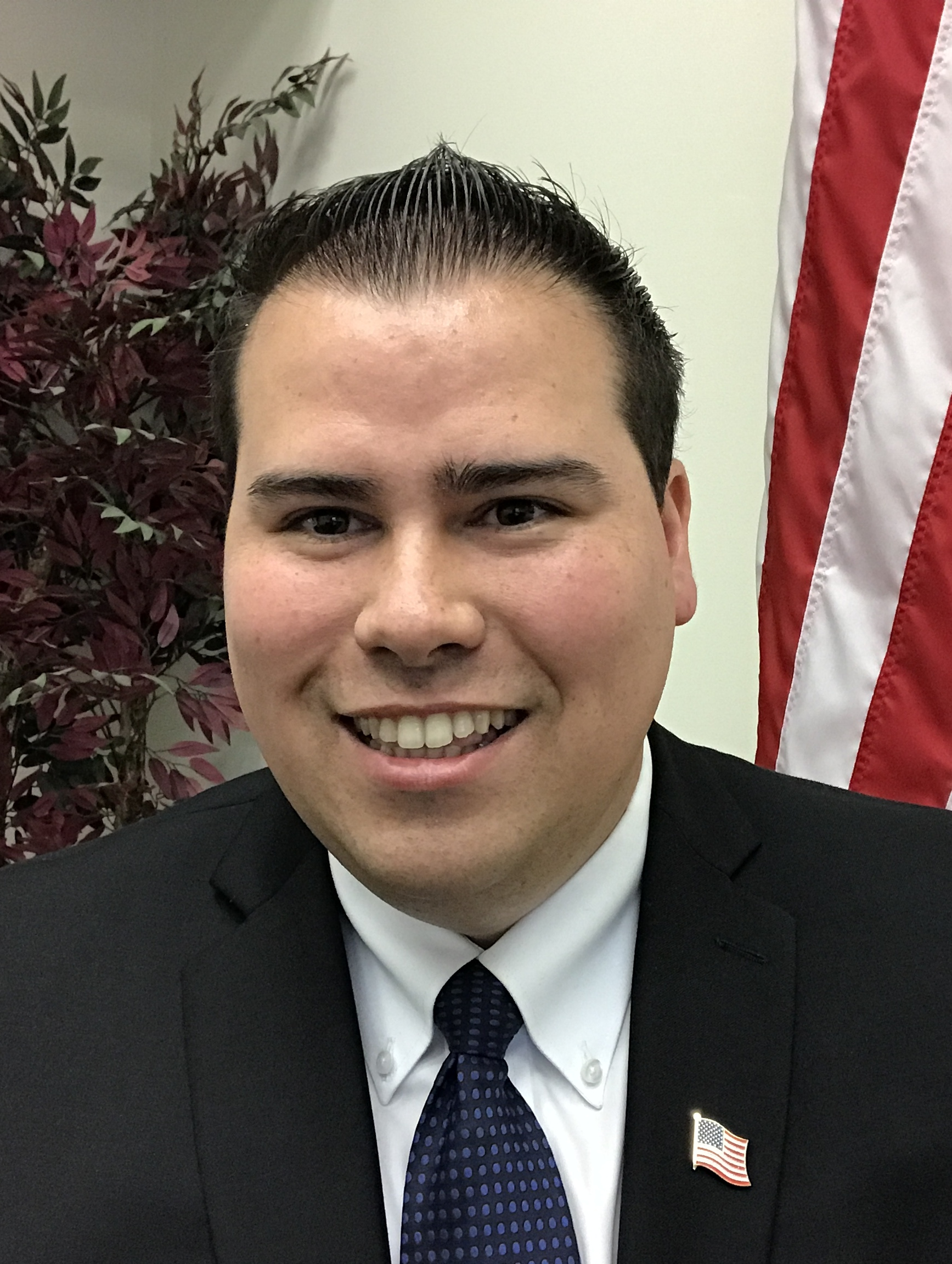
- Navarro in 2017
- Born: January 9, 1989 (age 37); Inglewood, California, U.S.
- Education: ITT-Technical Institute
- Known for: Perennial candidate for Congress in Southern California
- Political party: Republican
- Convictions: Illegal tracking with an electronic device, Stalking, Wire fraud
- Penalty: Four years in prison

Omar Navarro (born January 9, 1989) is an American politician known for being a perennial candidate for the seat of California's 43rd congressional district against longtime Democratic congresswoman Maxine Waters. A member of the Republican Party, he ran unsuccessfully against Waters in 2016, 2018, 2020, and 2022.

In December 2019, Navarro pleaded guilty to one count of stalking, having harassed an ex-girlfriend and was sentenced to six months in county jail.

In June 2025, Navarro pleaded guilty to one count of wire fraud, having embezzled approximately $250,000 from his political campaign. On February 23, 2026, Navarro was sentenced to four years in federal prison.

== Early life and career ==
Navarro was born and raised in Inglewood, California. He spent a significant portion of his life in Hawthorne and Torrance. Navarro's parents are Mexican and Cuban immigrants.

Navarro was previously an independent business owner in the tech industry specializing in marketing. Navarro served as volunteer traffic commissioner for Torrance, California, until July 2017, following a resignation forced by the vote of Torrance City Council to remove him from his position.

== Electoral history ==
=== 2016 ===
After declaring for Congress, Navarro was defeated by Waters who received 76.1% of the vote. The district includes parts of L.A., Torrance, Carson, Gardena, Hawthorne, Inglewood, Lawndale and Lomita.

=== 2018 ===
Navarro challenged Waters for her seat in 2018. He was again defeated, with Waters receiving 77.7% of the vote to Navarro's 22.3%.

Navarro's campaign raised more than $450,000 in the third quarter and spent $11,845 on rental fees and meals at the Trump National Golf Club in Rancho Palos Verdes as well as multiple stays at the Trump International Hotel in Las Vegas. Navarro received national attention for raising over $1,000,000 during his 2018 campaign as a whole.

=== 2020 ===
In the March 3, 2020, California primary, Navarro failed to qualify for the general election, finishing third with 10.9% of the total vote. In the general election, Waters received 78.1% of the vote with Republican Joe Collins finishing second with 11.1%. Navarro was unable to campaign at the time of the primary as he was incarcerated in San Francisco; however, he still raised $500,000 in donations.

=== 2022 ===
On January 11, 2021, Navarro announced that he would be challenging Waters again in 2022. In the June 7, 2022, California primary, Navarro finished second to Waters with 13.2% of the total vote. In the general election, Waters received 77.3% of the vote with Navarro receiving 22.7%, marking the fourth consecutive election cycle that Navarro has been defeated. Following this loss, Navarro announced he was moving to Florida.

=== Endorsements ===
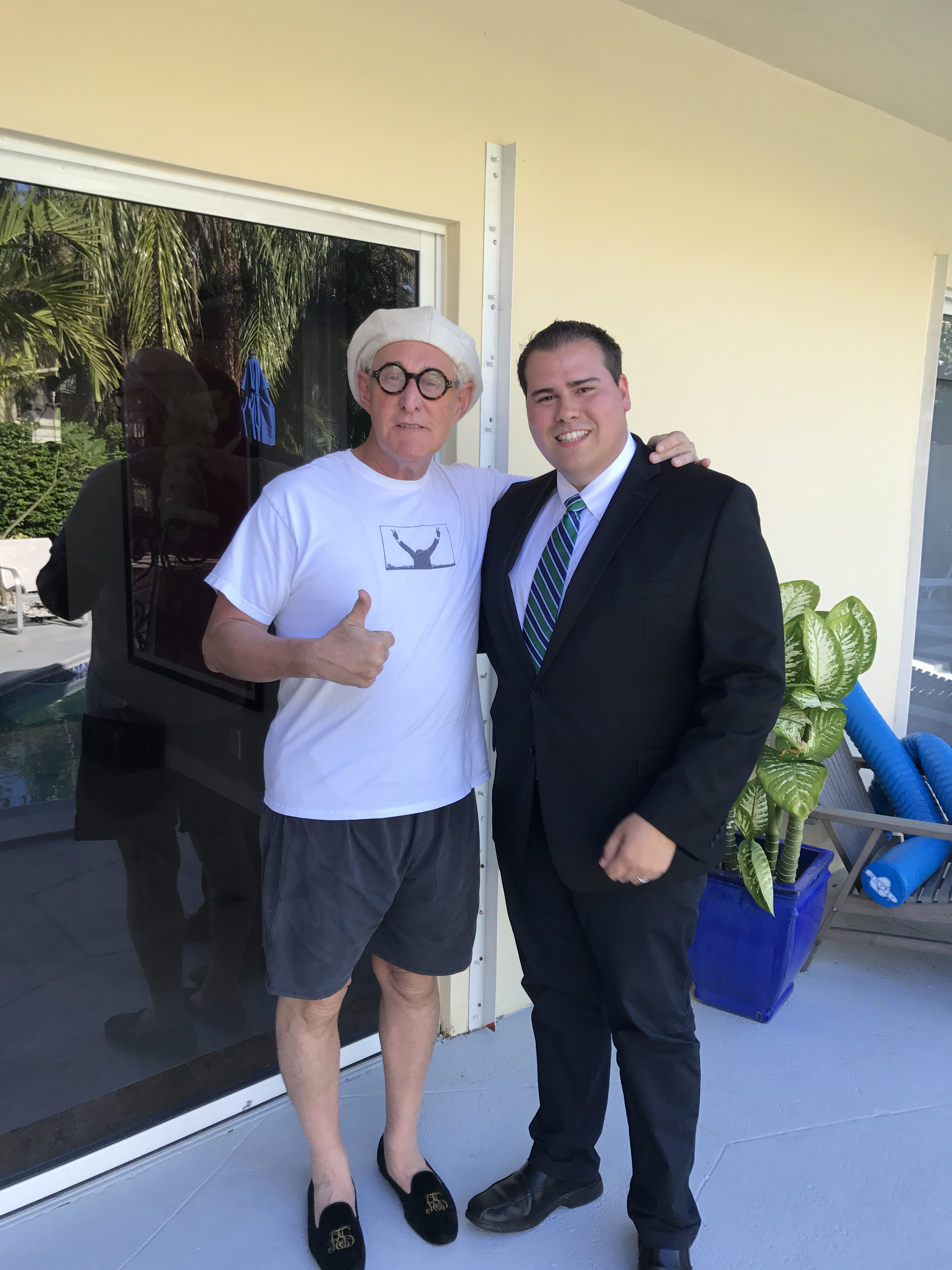
Navarro with advisor Roger Stone

Navarro has had endorsements from Roger Stone, Michael Flynn, Joe Arpaio, Herman Cain, and Alex Jones, among others. He met Flynn in person in February 2018, while in Washington to attend the Conservative Political Action Conference.

=== Conspiracy theories ===
In October 2020, Navarro tweeted "Where we go one, we go all", a slogan adopted by the community surrounding the QAnon conspiracy theory.

== Criminal history ==
=== Electronic tracking device ===
Navarro was convicted of attaching an illegal electronic tracking device to his wife's car on February 14, 2016. He pleaded guilty to the misdemeanor charge in Orange County and was sentenced to a day in jail and 18 months' probation in September 2016. He was also ordered to take an anger management course. He was on probation until March 2018.

Navarro was found guilty just two weeks before the 2016 election. Before Navarro pleaded guilty, he blamed the Orange County District Attorney's Office and the media for spreading fake news.

=== Forged letter ===
Navarro released a fraudulent letter on his Twitter account that indicated Maxine Waters wanted to resettle tens of thousands of refugees into her Los Angeles district. The letter appeared to be printed on Waters' House office stationery and looked as if written by her, bearing her signature, alleging that she was in communication with CAIR-LA (a Los Angeles-based chapter of the Council on American-Islamic Relations) and Hussam Ayloush (the executive director of CAIR-LA) to relocate refugees in Los Angeles. The letter contained several inaccuracies, including references to committees and subcommittees on which Waters does not serve, and listing an address for a district office that had been closed for nearly a decade.

Navarro was interrogated by the FBI and Capitol Police regarding the matter. He told the Los Angeles Times that he did not fabricate the letter and claimed that he received it from a person whose name he would not reveal and with whom he had not been in touch since he received the letter.

=== Restraining order, alleged stalking, and state incarceration ===
On August 1, 2019, a restraining order was issued against Navarro for five years for his former girlfriend, conservative activist DeAnna Lorraine Tesoriero, who is publicly known as DeAnna Lorraine. In the ruling, the judge cited Navarro's "harassing and stalking" behavior towards Tesoriero. He sent various text messages to his ex-girlfriend stating that he would threaten to get her evicted from her home and killed, kill her family, take her cat, and post naked photos of her if she did not meet with him. This is Navarro's second restraining order against a former partner in two years as one was previously issued in 2017 for his ex-wife.

On December 7, 2019, Navarro attempted to meet with Lorraine and was charged with stalking, criminal threats, attempted extortion (all felonies), and violating a restraining order (a misdemeanor). On December 12, 2019, Navarro was remanded into custody on a further seven charges by San Francisco County Superior Court judge Suzanne Bolanos for being a threat to public safety, and he was ordered to undergo a psychiatric evaluation. He pleaded guilty to one charge and served six months in jail.

=== Campaign finance violations and federal incarceration ===
On September 27, 2023, Navarro was indicted on 43 federal charges including misuse of campaign finances. Navarro was already in state custody on unrelated charges and was expected to be turned over soon to federal authorities.

In June 2025, Navarro pleaded guilty to one count of wire fraud after embezzling approximately $250,000 from his political campaign between 2017 and 2021. On February 23, 2026, Navarro was sentenced to four years in federal prison. Navarro's mother and another co-conspirator also plead guilty to federal charges in relation to the scheme where money was funnelled from his campaign funds to be ultimately used for personal expenses, including Las Vegas trips, a Nintendo Switch, legal fees for his criminal stalking defense in 2019, and personal bank deposits. Navarro is currently housed at FCI Phoenix with a release date in July 2029.

As of 2026, Navarro still contends that his arrest and prosecution was politically motivated by the Democratic Party for his challenging of Maxine Waters despite the fact that he pleaded guilty and was ultimately prosecuted and sentenced by the Department of Justice under the Trump Administration.
