= Jim Bates (politician) =

American politician (born 1941)

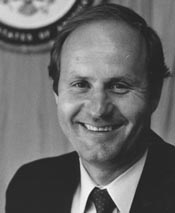

Member of the U.S. House of Representatives from California's 44th district
- In office January 3, 1983 – January 3, 1991
- Preceded by: New constituency
- Succeeded by: Duke Cunningham

Chair of the San Diego County Board of Supervisors
- In office 1982
- Preceded by: Paul Eckert
- Succeeded by: Paul Fordem
- In office January 5, 1977 – January 5, 1978
- Preceded by: Lee Taylor
- Succeeded by: Tom Hamilton

Member of the San Diego County Board of Supervisors from the 4th district
- In office 1976–1982
- Preceded by: Jim Bear
- Succeeded by: Leon Williams

Member of the San Diego City Council from the 8th district
- In office 1971 – January 23, 1975
- Preceded by: Mike Schaefer
- Succeeded by: Jess Haro

Personal details
- Born: July 21, 1941 (age 85) Denver, Colorado, U.S.
- Party: Democratic
- Education: San Diego State University (BA)

Jim Bates (born July 21, 1941) is an American former politician who served as a Democratic elected official from San Diego, California. He served four terms in the United States House of Representatives from 1983 to 1991. He was the first congressman to be disciplined for sexual harassment.

== Biography ==
Bates was born in Denver, Colorado, and graduated from East High School (Denver) in 1959. He joined the United States Marine Corps in 1959, and served in the Corps until 1963. Relocating to San Diego, Bates became a banker and was employed in the aerospace industry. He obtained his bachelor's degree from San Diego State University in 1975.

== Political career ==
Bates was elected to the San Diego city council in 1971 and served until 1974. He was elected chairman of the San Diego County board of supervisors in 1977, and would serve in that position again in 1982. At the time he was the youngest chairman of the board.

=== US House of Representatives ===
Bates resigned from the board in 1982 to run for a seat in the U.S. House of Representatives, representing California's newly created 44th Congressional District. The district was created after the 1980 census round of redistricting as the most Democratic district in the San Diego area; it included much of the territory represented for 18 years by Lionel Van Deerlin before his defeat by Duncan Hunter. Bates won election in 1982 with 65% of the vote, and was re-elected in 1984, 1986, and 1988, with 69.7%, 64.2%, and 59.7% of the vote, respectively.

Bates was defeated in the 1990 election 46.3%-44.8% by Randy "Duke" Cunningham. Bates ran in the Democratic primary in June 1992 for the newly created 50th District, which included much of his former territory. However, he lost the nomination to his former aide, Bob Filner.

== Ethics investigations and sexual harassment ==
In 1988, stories surfaced of Bates having groped and touched both women and men who worked for him as well as others. Dorena Bertussi, a legislative assistant for Bates, testified that "he put my leg in between his and started to do a bump and grind on it, like a dog," and sued Bates for sexual harassment. In 1989, Bates was reprimanded by the House with their lightest possible censure, a "letter of reproval". He was the first congressman to be sanctioned by the House for sexual harassment; his case is now explicitly cited in the House ethics manual as an example of impermissible sexual harassment. Following Bates's loss in the 1990 election, Bertussi dropped her suit against him.

Bates was later implicated in the House banking scandal; he had written four bad checks to his congressional campaign.

== Later career ==
In 2017 Bates founded the United States-Bangladesh Friendship Group, of which he is currently Executive Director. That group helps promotes clean water supplies and recently facilitated delivery of $3.7 million in medical equipment and supplies, donated by the non-profit Helping Hand.

== Electoral history ==
1982 United States House of Representatives elections in California
Party	Candidate	Votes	%
Democratic	Jim Bates	78,474	64.9
Republican	Shirley M. Gissendanner	38,447	31.8
Libertarian	Jim Conole	3,904	3.3
Total votes		120,825	100.0
Democratic win (new seat)			

1984 United States House of Representatives elections in California
Party	Candidate	Votes	%
Democratic	Jim Bates (Incumbent)	99,378	69.7
Republican	Neill Campbell	39,977	28.1
Libertarian	Jim Conole	3,206	2.2
Total votes		142,561	100.0
Democratic hold			

1986 United States House of Representatives elections in California
Party	Candidate	Votes	%
Democratic	Jim Bates (Incumbent)	70,557	64.2
Republican	Bill Mitchell	36,359	33.2
Peace and Freedom	Shirley Rachel Issacson	1,676	1.5
Libertarian	Dennis Thompson	1,244	1.1
Total votes		109,836	100.0
Democratic hold			

1988 United States House of Representatives elections in California
Party	Candidate	Votes	%
Democratic	Jim Bates (Incumbent)	90,796	59.7
Republican	Rob Butterfield	55,511	36.5
Libertarian	Dennis Thompson	5,782	3.8
Total votes		152,089	100.0
Democratic hold			

1990 United States House of Representatives elections in California
Party	Candidate	Votes	%
Republican	Duke Cunningham	50,377	46.3
Democratic	Jim Bates (Incumbent)	48,712	44.8
Peace and Freedom	Donna White	5,237	4.9
Libertarian	John Wallner	4,385	4.0
Total votes		108,711	100.0
Republican gain from Democratic			

== See also ==
- List of federal political sex scandals in the United States

U.S. House of Representatives
New constituency	Member of the U.S. House of Representatives from California's 44th congressional district 1983–1991	Succeeded by Duke Cunningham
U.S. order of precedence (ceremonial)
Preceded by Mark Green as Former U.S. Representative	Order of precedence of the United States as Former U.S. Representative	Succeeded by Douglas Bosco as Former U.S. Representative
