= 1988 United States House of Representatives elections in California =

- November 8, 1988

All 45 California seats to the United States House of Representatives
	Majority party	Minority party
Party	Democratic	Republican
Last election	27	18
Seats won	27	18
Seat change	Steady	Steady
Popular vote	4,944,646	4,173,715
Percentage	52.71%	44.49%
- Results: Democratic hold Republican hold

The United States House of Representatives elections in California, 1988 was an election for California's delegation to the United States House of Representatives, which occurred as part of the general election of the House of Representatives on November 8, 1988. No districts switched parties, so the delegation remained at 27 Democrats and 18 Republicans.

== Overview ==
United States HoR elections in California, 1988
Party	Votes	%	Seats
Democratic	4,944,646	52.71%	27
Republican	4,173,715	44.49%	18
Libertarian	170,100	1.81%	0
Peace and Freedom	82,931	0.88%	0
American Independent	7,947	0.08%	0
Write-ins	1,901	0.02%	0
Totals	9,381,240	100.00%	45

== Results ==
Final results from the Clerk of the House of Representatives:

=== District 1 ===
California's 1st congressional district election, 1988
Party	Candidate	Votes	%
Democratic	Douglas H. Bosco (incumbent)	159,815	62.88
Republican	Samuel "Mark" Vanderbilt	72,189	28.40
Peace and Freedom	Eric Fried	22,150	8.72
Total votes		254,154	100.00
Turnout			
Democratic hold			

=== District 2 ===
California's 2nd congressional district election, 1988
Party	Candidate	Votes	%
Republican	Wally Herger (incumbent)	139,010	58.82
Democratic	Wayne R. Meyer	91,088	38.54
Libertarian	Harry Hugh "Doc" Pendery	6,253	2.65
Total votes		236,351	100.00
Turnout			
Republican hold			

=== District 3 ===
California's 3rd congressional district election, 1988
Party	Candidate	Votes	%
Democratic	Robert Matsui (incumbent)	183,470	71.18
Republican	Lowell Patrick Landowski	74,296	28.82
Total votes		257,766	100.00
Turnout			
Democratic hold			

=== District 4 ===
California's 4th congressional district election, 1988
Party	Candidate	Votes	%
Democratic	Vic Fazio (incumbent)	181,184	99.28
No party	Write-ins	1,306	0.72
Total votes		182,490	100.00
Turnout			
Democratic hold			

=== District 5 ===
California's 5th congressional district election, 1988
Party	Candidate	Votes	%
Democratic	Nancy Pelosi (incumbent)	133,530	76.41
Republican	Bruce Michael O'Neill	33,692	19.28
Peace and Freedom	Theodore Adrian "Ted" Zuur	3,975	2.27
Libertarian	Sam Grove	3,561	2.04
Total votes		174,758	100.00
Turnout			
Democratic hold			

=== District 6 ===
California's 6th congressional district election, 1988
Party	Candidate	Votes	%
Democratic	Barbara Boxer (incumbent)	176,645	73.35
Republican	William Quinby Steinmetz	64,174	26.65
Total votes		240,819	100.00
Turnout			
Democratic hold			

=== District 7 ===
California's 7th congressional district election, 1988
Party	Candidate	Votes	%
Democratic	George Miller (incumbent)	170,006	68.42
Republican	Jean Last	78,478	31.58
Total votes		248,484	100.00
Turnout			
Democratic hold			

=== District 8 ===
California's 8th congressional district election, 1988
Party	Candidate	Votes	%
Democratic	Ronald Dellums (incumbent)	163,221	66.57
Republican	John J. Cuddihy, Jr.	76,531	31.21
Peace and Freedom	Tom Condit	5,444	2.22
Total votes		245,196	100.00
Turnout			
Democratic hold			

=== District 9 ===
California's 9th congressional district election, 1988
Party	Candidate	Votes	%
Democratic	Pete Stark (incumbent)	152,866	72.96
Republican	Howard Hertz	56,656	27.04
Total votes		209,522	100.00
Turnout			
Democratic hold			

=== District 10 ===
California's 10th congressional district election, 1988
Party	Candidate	Votes	%
Democratic	Don Edwards (incumbent)	142,500	86.21
Libertarian	Kennita Watson	22,801	13.79
Total votes		165,301	100.00
Turnout			
Democratic hold			

=== District 11 ===
California's 11th congressional district election, 1988
Party	Candidate	Votes	%
Democratic	Tom Lantos (incumbent)	145,484	70.96
Republican	Bill Quarishi	50,050	24.41
Libertarian	Bill Wade	4,683	2.28
Peace and Freedom	Victor Martinez	2,906	1.42
American Independent	Nicholas W. Kudrovzeff	1,893	0.92
Total votes		205,016	100.00
Turnout			
Democratic hold			

=== District 12 ===
California's 12th congressional district election, 1988
Party	Candidate	Votes	%
Republican	Tom Campbell	136,384	51.67
Democratic	Anna Eshoo	121,523	46.04
Libertarian	Tom Grey	6,023	2.28
Total votes		263,930	100.00
Turnout			
Republican hold			

=== District 13 ===
California's 13th congressional district election, 1988
Party	Candidate	Votes	%
Democratic	Norm Mineta (incumbent)	143,980	67.12
Republican	Luke Somner	63,959	29.81
Libertarian	John H. Webster	6,583	3.07
Total votes		214,522	100.00
Turnout			
Democratic hold			

=== District 14 ===
California's 14th congressional district election, 1988
Party	Candidate	Votes	%
Republican	Norman D. Shumway (incumbent)	173,876	62.60
Democratic	Patricia Malberg	103,899	37.40
Total votes		277,775	100.00
Turnout			
Republican hold			

=== District 15 ===
California's 15th congressional district election, 1988
Party	Candidate	Votes	%
Democratic	Tony Coelho (incumbent)	118,710	69.75
Republican	Carol Harner	47,957	28.18
Libertarian	Richard M. Harris	3,526	2.07
Total votes		170,193	100.00
Turnout			
Democratic hold			

=== District 16 ===
California's 16th congressional district election, 1988
Party	Candidate	Votes	%
Democratic	Leon Panetta (incumbent)	177,452	78.58
Republican	Stanley K. Monteith	48,375	21.42
Total votes		225,827	100.00
Turnout			
Democratic hold			

=== District 17 ===
California's 17th congressional district election, 1988
Party	Candidate	Votes	%
Republican	Charles (Chip) Pashayan (inc.)	129,568	71.47
Democratic	Vincent J. Lavery	51,730	28.53
Total votes		181,298	100.00
Turnout			
Republican hold			

=== District 18 ===
California's 18th congressional district election, 1988
Party	Candidate	Votes	%
Democratic	Richard Lehman (incumbent)	125,715	69.94
Republican	David A. Linn	54,034	30.06
Total votes		179,749	100.00
Turnout			
Democratic hold			

=== District 19 ===
California's 19th congressional district election, 1988
Party	Candidate	Votes	%
Republican	Bob Lagomarsino (incumbent)	116,026	50.24
Democratic	Gary K. Hart	112,033	48.52
Libertarian	Robert Donaldson	2,865	1.24
Total votes		230,924	100.00
Turnout			
Republican hold			

=== District 20 ===
California's 20th congressional district election, 1988
Party	Candidate	Votes	%
Republican	Bill Thomas (incumbent)	162,779	71.08
Democratic	Lita Reid	62,037	27.09
Libertarian	David L. Bersohn	4,190	1.83
Total votes		229,006	100.00
Turnout			
Republican hold			

=== District 21 ===
California's 21st congressional district election, 1988
Party	Candidate	Votes	%
Republican	Elton Gallegly (incumbent)	181,413	69.06
Democratic	Donald E. Stevens	75,739	28.83
Libertarian	Robert Jay	5,519	2.10
Total votes		262,671	100.00
Turnout			
Republican hold			

=== District 22 ===
California's 22nd congressional district election, 1988
Party	Candidate	Votes	%
Republican	Carlos J. Moorhead (incumbent)	164,699	69.55
Democratic	John G. Simmons	61,555	25.99
Peace and Freedom	Shirley Rachel Isaacson	6,298	2.66
Libertarian	Ted Brown	4,259	1.80
Total votes		236,811	100.00
Turnout			
Republican hold			

=== District 23 ===
California's 23rd congressional district election, 1988
Party	Candidate	Votes	%
Democratic	Anthony C. Beilenson (incumbent)	147,858	63.49
Republican	Jim Salomon	77,184	33.14
Libertarian	John R. Vernon	4,503	1.93
Peace and Freedom	John Honigsfeld	3,316	1.42
No party	Write-ins	18	0.01
Total votes		232,879	100.00
Turnout			
Democratic hold			

=== District 24 ===
California's 24th congressional district election, 1988
Party	Candidate	Votes	%
Democratic	Henry Waxman (incumbent)	112,038	72.25
Republican	John N. Cowles	36,835	23.75
Peace and Freedom	James Green	3,571	2.30
Libertarian	George Abrahams	2,627	1.69
Total votes		155,071	100.00
Turnout			
Democratic hold			

=== District 25 ===
California's 25th congressional district election, 1988
Party	Candidate	Votes	%
Democratic	Edward R. Roybal (incumbent)	85,378	85.48
Peace and Freedom	Paul Reyes	8,746	8.76
Libertarian	John C. Thie	5,752	5.76
Total votes		99,876	100.00
Turnout			
Democratic hold			

=== District 26 ===
California's 26th congressional district election, 1988
Party	Candidate	Votes	%
Democratic	Howard Berman (incumbent)	126,930	70.34
Republican	Gerald C. "Brodie" Broderson	53,518	29.66
Total votes		180,448	100.00
Turnout			
Democratic hold			

=== District 27 ===
California's 27th congressional district election, 1988
Party	Candidate	Votes	%
Democratic	Mel Levine (incumbent)	148,814	67.54
Republican	Dennis Galbraith	65,307	29.64
Libertarian	William J. Fulco	6,214	2.82
Total votes		220,335	100.00
Turnout			
Democratic hold			

=== District 28 ===
California's 28th congressional district election, 1988
Party	Candidate	Votes	%
Democratic	Julian C. Dixon (incumbent)	109,801	76.07
Republican	George Zaldivar Adams	28,645	19.85
Libertarian	Howard Johnson	3,080	2.13
Peace and Freedom	Salomea Honigsfeld	2,811	1.95
Total votes		144,337	100.00
Turnout			
Democratic hold			

=== District 29 ===
California's 29th congressional district election, 1988
Party	Candidate	Votes	%
Democratic	Augustus F. Hawkins (incumbent)	88,169	82.84
Republican	Reuben D. Franco	14,543	13.66
Libertarian	Gregory P. Gilmore	3,724	3.50
Total votes		106,436	100.00
Turnout			
Democratic hold			

=== District 30 ===
California's 30th congressional district election, 1988
Party	Candidate	Votes	%
Democratic	Matthew G. Martinez (incumbent)	72,253	59.89
Republican	Ralph Roy Ramirez	43,833	36.33
American Independent	Houston A. Myers	2,694	2.23
Libertarian	Kim J. Goldsworthy	1,864	1.55
Total votes		120,644	100.00
Turnout			
Democratic hold			

=== District 31 ===
California's 31st congressional district election, 1988
Party	Candidate	Votes	%
Democratic	Mervyn M. Dymally (incumbent)	100,919	71.56
Republican	Arnold C. May	36,017	25.54
Peace and Freedom	B. Kwaku Duren	4,091	2.90
Total votes		141,027	100.00
Turnout			
Democratic hold			

=== District 32 ===
California's 32nd congressional district election, 1988
Party	Candidate	Votes	%
Democratic	Glenn M. Anderson (incumbent)	114,666	66.92
Republican	Sanford W. Kahn	50,710	29.59
Peace and Freedom	Vikki Murdock	4,032	2.35
Libertarian	Marc F. Denny	1,941	1.13
Total votes		171,349	100.00
Turnout			
Democratic hold			

=== District 33 ===
California's 33rd congressional district election, 1988
Party	Candidate	Votes	%
Republican	David Dreier (incumbent)	151,704	69.15
Democratic	Nelson Gentry	57,586	26.25
Libertarian	Gail Lightfoot	6,601	3.01
Peace and Freedom	James Michael "Mike" Noonan	3,492	1.59
Total votes		219,383	100.00
Turnout			
Republican hold			

=== District 34 ===
California's 34th congressional district election, 1988
Party	Candidate	Votes	%
Democratic	Esteban Torres (incumbent)	92,087	63.19
Republican	Charles M. House	50,954	34.97
Libertarian	Carl M. "Marty" Swinney	2,686	1.84
Total votes		145,727	100.00
Turnout			
Democratic hold			

=== District 35 ===
California's 35th congressional district election, 1988
Party	Candidate	Votes	%
Republican	Jerry Lewis (incumbent)	181,203	70.43
Democratic	Paul Sweeney	71,186	27.67
Libertarian	Jeff Shuman	4,879	1.90
Total votes		257,268	100.00
Turnout			
Republican hold			

=== District 36 ===
California's 36th congressional district election, 1988
Party	Candidate	Votes	%
Democratic	George Brown, Jr. (incumbent)	103,493	54.00
Republican	John Paul Stark	81,413	42.48
Libertarian	Kenneth E. Valentine	3,382	1.76
American Independent	Fred L. Anderson	3,360	1.75
Total votes		191,648	100.00
Turnout			
Democratic hold			

=== District 37 ===
California's 37th congressional district election, 1988
Party	Candidate	Votes	%
Republican	Al McCandless (incumbent)	174,284	64.25
Democratic	Johnny Pearson	89,666	33.06
Libertarian	Bonnie Flickinger	7,169	2.64
No party	Write-ins	123	0.05
Total votes		271,242	100.00
Turnout			
Republican hold			

=== District 38 ===
California's 38th congressional district election, 1988
Party	Candidate	Votes	%
Republican	Bob Dornan (incumbent)	87,690	59.50
Democratic	Jerry Yudelson	52,399	35.56
Libertarian	Bruce McKay	3,733	2.53
Peace and Freedom	Frank German	3,547	2.41
Total votes		147,369	100.00
Turnout			
Republican hold			

=== District 39 ===
California's 39th congressional district election, 1988
Party	Candidate	Votes	%
Republican	William E. Dannemeyer (incumbent)	169,360	73.84
Democratic	Don E. Marquis	52,162	22.74
Libertarian	Lee Connelly	7,470	3.26
No party	Write-ins	367	0.16
Total votes		229,359	100.00
Turnout			
Republican hold			

=== District 40 ===
California's 40th congressional district election, 1988
Party	Candidate	Votes	%
Republican	Christopher Cox	181,269	67.04
Democratic	Lida Lenney	80,782	29.88
Libertarian	Roger Bloxham	4,539	1.68
Peace and Freedom	Gretchen J. Farsai	3,699	1.37
No party	Write-ins	87	0.03
Total votes		270,376	100.00
Turnout			
Republican hold			

=== District 41 ===
California's 41st congressional district election, 1988
Party	Candidate	Votes	%
Republican	Bill Lowery (incumbent)	187,380	65.57
Democratic	Daniel F. "Dan" Kripke	88,192	30.86
Libertarian	Richard "Dick" Rider	5,336	1.87
Peace and Freedom	C. T. Weber	4,853	1.70
Total votes		285,761	100.00
Turnout			
Republican hold			

=== District 42 ===
California's 42nd congressional district election, 1988
Party	Candidate	Votes	%
Republican	Dana Rohrabacher	153,280	64.24
Democratic	Guy C. Kimbrough	78,778	33.01
Libertarian	Richard D. Rose	6,563	2.75
Total votes		238,621	100.00
Turnout			
Republican hold			

=== District 43 ===
California's 43rd congressional district election, 1988
Party	Candidate	Votes	%
Republican	Ron Packard (incumbent)	202,478	71.67
Democratic	Howard Greenbaum	72,499	25.66
Libertarian	Daniel L. Muhe	7,552	2.67
Total votes		282,529	100.00
Turnout			
Republican hold			

=== District 44 ===
California's 44th congressional district election, 1988
Party	Candidate	Votes	%
Democratic	Jim Bates (incumbent)	90,796	59.70
Republican	Rob Butterfield	55,511	36.50
Libertarian	Dennis Thompson	5,782	3.80
Total votes		152,089	100.00
Turnout			
Democratic hold			

=== District 45 ===
California's 45th congressional district election, 1988
Party	Candidate	Votes	%
Republican	Duncan Hunter (incumbent)	166,451	74.01
Democratic	Pete Lepiscopo	54,012	24.02
Libertarian	Perry Willis	4,440	1.97
Total votes		224,903	100.00
Turnout			
Republican hold			

== See also ==
- 101st United States Congress
- Political party strength in California
- Political party strength in U.S. states
- 1988 United States House of Representatives elections
