= Norman D. Shumway =

American politician (1934–2022)

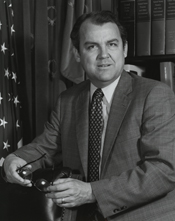

Member of the board of directors of the Legal Services Corporation
- In office September 1991 – 1993
- President: George H. W. Bush
- Preceded by: Luis Guinot Jr.
- Succeeded by: Thomas F. Smegal Jr.

Member of the California Public Utilities Commission
- In office 1991–1995
- Governor: Pete Wilson

Member of the U.S. House of Representatives from California's 14th district
- In office January 3, 1979 – January 3, 1991
- Preceded by: John J. McFall
- Succeeded by: John Doolittle

Member of the San Joaquin County Board of Supervisors
- In office 1974–1979
- Governor: Ronald Reagan

Personal details
- Born: Norman David Shumway; July 28, 1934 Phoenix, Arizona, U.S.
- Died: November 1, 2022 (aged 88) Bountiful, Utah, U.S.
- Party: Republican
- Spouse: Luana Schow
- Children: 6
- Education: Stockton College (AA); University of Utah (BS); University of California, Hastings College of the Law (JD)

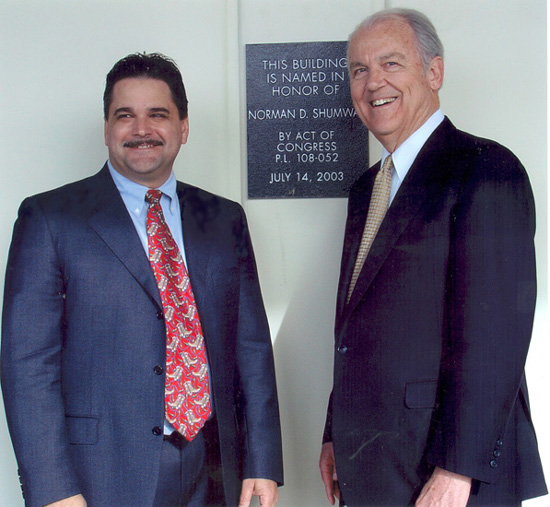
Richard Pombo with Norm Shumway at the Hammer Ranch Post Office dedication in Stockton (2004)

Norman David Shumway (July 28, 1934 – November 1, 2022) was an American lawyer and politician who served six terms as a Republican member of the United States House of Representatives from 1979 to 1991.

== Early life ==
Shumway was born on July 28, 1934, in Phoenix, Arizona. In 1952, Shumway graduated from Stockton High School in Stockton, California.

== Education ==
In 1954, Shumway earned an Associate of Arts degree from Stockton College. In 1960, Shumway earned a Bachelor of Science degree in political science from University of Utah. In 1963, Shumway earned a J.D. degree from University of California, Hastings College of the Law.

== Career ==
Prior to entering public office, Shumway was a partner in a Stockton law firm. He taught legal courses at San Joaquin Delta College and at Humphreys College, and held a lifetime California teaching credential.

In 1974, Shumway was appointed by Governor Ronald Reagan to the San Joaquin County Board of Supervisors. Shumway was elected to the Board in 1974 and in 1978. He was Vice chairman of the board in 1977 and chairman in 1978.

=== Tenure in Congress ===
On November 7, 1978, Shumway won the election and became a Republican member of the United States House of Representatives for California's 14th congressional district. Shumway defeated John J. McFall and George Darold Waldron with 53.39% of the votes.

Shumway won reelection five times but chose not to seek re-election in 1990. A post office building in Stockton was named for him.

As a member of the House Committee on Banking, Finance and Urban Affairs, Shumway served as the ranking minority member of the Subcommittee on Economic Stabilization. He was also a member of the Subcommittee on International Trade, Investment and Monetary Policy. As a member of the House Committee on Merchant Marine and Fisheries, Shumway served as the ranking minority member of the Subcommittee on Oceanography. He further served as a member of the House Select Committee on Aging.

During his years in Congress, Shumway was one of only two members of the House of Representatives who were fluent in spoken Japanese. Consequently, he was selected many times to lead delegations of his colleagues to Japan to meet with representatives of Japanese government, industry and education. He participated in many forums and seminars, in both the United States and Japan, dealing with trade conflicts, defense issues, and the U.S.–Japan relationship in general. He was asked by President Ronald Reagan to represent him at the funeral of former Prime Minister Takeo Miki. Shumway was active in promoting several parliamentary exchanges between Diet members and members of the US Congress, and helped to host Diet members as they visited the United States. He traveled extensively in Japan, and remained a student of Japanese culture.

=== After Congress ===
After leaving Congress, he was hired as a senior legislative analyst at the Washington, D.C.–based lobbying and public relations firm Fleishman-Hillard.

Shumway was appointed by Governor Pete Wilson to the Public Utilities Commission for the State of California. He served as a Commissioner for four years. Governor Wilson then appointed him to the California Narcotic Addict Evaluation Authority, where he served for one year as a parole board member.

President George H. W. Bush appointed Shumway to the board of directors of Legal Services Corporation. He has also served on the boards of U.S. English, Goodwill Industries of America and Omniplex, Ltd. He was a member of the board of visitors of the J. Reuben Clark Law School at Brigham Young University from 1989 to 1991. He has served on the board of trustees of the Utah Council for Citizen Diplomacy and was a member of the Sons of Utah Pioneers. Boy Scouts of America and numerous volunteer associations have honored him. Following his years of service to his church, he became a member of the President's National Advisory Board at Utah Valley University and was president (2014 to 2018) of Mikuni International College in Yuzawa, Niigata Ken, Japan.

== Personal life ==
In 1960, Shumway married Luana Schow. They have six children. Shumway and his family lived in Bountiful, Utah.

Shumway was active as a lifelong member of the Church of Jesus Christ of Latter-day Saints. He served as a missionary to Japan from 1954 to 1958, and as a bishop of the church from 1969 to 1974. He has been a seminary instructor, high priest group leader, gospel doctrine teacher, ward organist, high councilman and a counselor in a stake presidency. From 1996 to 1999 he was president of the Japan Hiroshima Mission. In 2000–2001 he was the Public Affairs Director for the Asia North Area, stationed in Tokyo. He and his wife were Hosting Directors for the First Presidency of the Church from 2002 through 2005. From 2006 to 2008 they served as Church representatives to the United Nations in New York City. They served in the Boston Massachusetts Mission from 2010 to 2012, where they were proselyting and leadership support missionaries. Shumway served as first counselor in the Lynnfield Ward ward bishopric while a missionary and his wife taught early morning seminary. During 2013 and 2014, the Shumways served a mission in the Japan Tokyo Temple.

In October 2009, Shumway published his 570-page autobiography, Times and Seasons of Norman D. Shumway. He later was the major compiler of Pioneer Life in Shumway, Arizona.

In his later years, Shumway continued to share his passion for his country with all with whom he came in contact. He reminded his grandchildren to be "loyal to the constitution and the founding fathers that did so much for our country through God's power."

== Death ==
Shumway was diagnosed with a terminal brain tumor in the fall of 2022. He died on the morning of November 1, 2022, at the age of 88.

== Legacy ==
- Norman D. Shumway Station of the U.S. Post Office.

== Electoral history ==
1978 United States House of Representatives elections in California
Party	Candidate	Votes	%
Republican	Norman D. Shumway (Incumbent)	95,962	53.4
Democratic	John J. McFall (Incumbent)	76,602	42.6
American Independent	George Darold Waldron	7,163	4.0
Total votes		179,727	100.0
Turnout			
Republican gain from Democratic			

1980 United States House of Representatives elections in California
Party	Candidate	Votes	%
Republican	Norman D. Shumway (Incumbent)	133,979	60.7
Democratic	Ann Cerney	79,883	36.2
Libertarian	Douglas G. Housley	6,717	3.0
Total votes		220,579	100.0
Turnout			
Republican hold			

1982 United States House of Representatives elections in California
Party	Candidate	Votes	%
Republican	Norman D. Shumway (Incumbent)	134,225	63.4
Democratic	Baron Reed	77,400	36.6
Total votes		211,625	100.0
Turnout			
Republican hold			

1984 United States House of Representatives elections in California
Party	Candidate	Votes	%
Republican	Norman D. Shumway (Incumbent)	179,238	73.3
Democratic	Ruth Paula Carlson	58,384	23.9
Libertarian	Fred W. Colburn	6,850	2.8
Total votes		244,472	100.0
Turnout			
Republican hold			

1986 United States House of Representatives elections in California
Party	Candidate	Votes	%
Republican	Norman D. Shumway (Incumbent)	146,906	71.6
Democratic	Bill Steele	53,597	26.1
Libertarian	Bruce A. Daniel	4,658	2.3
Total votes		205,161	100.0
Turnout			
Republican hold			

1988 United States House of Representatives elections in California
Party	Candidate	Votes	%
Republican	Norman D. Shumway (Incumbent)	173,876	62.6
Democratic	Patricia Malberg	103,899	37.4
Total votes		277,775	100.0
Turnout			
Republican hold			

U.S. House of Representatives
Preceded by John J. McFall	Member of the U.S. House of Representatives from California's 14th congressional district 1979–1991	Succeeded by John Doolittle
