= 1982 United States House of Representatives elections in California =

- November 2, 1982

All 45 California seats to the United States House of Representatives
| | Majority party | Minority party |
|---|---|---|
| Party | Democratic | Republican |
| Last election | 22 | 21 |
| Seats won | 28 | 17 |
| Seat change | ▲6 | ▼4 |
| Popular vote | 3,815,205 | 3,603,102 |
| Percentage | 50.32% | 47.52% |
- Democratic gain Republican gain Democratic hold Republican hold

The United States House of Representatives elections in California, 1982 was an election for California's delegation to the United States House of Representatives, which occurred as part of the general election of the House of Representatives on November 2, 1982. California gained two seats, both of which were won by Democrats, as a result of the 1980 census, and Democrats picked up three Republican-held districts.

== Overview ==
United States House of Representatives elections in California, 1982
| Party | Votes | % | Before | After | +/– |
|---|---|---|---|---|---|
| Democratic | 3,815,205 | 50.32% | 23 | 28 | +5 |
| Republican | 3,603,102 | 47.52% | 20 | 17 | -3 |
| Libertarian | 127,480 | 1.68% | 0 | 0 | 0 |
| Peace and Freedom | 31,270 | 0.41% | 0 | 0 | 0 |
| American Independent | 5,564 | 0.07% | 0 | 0 | 0 |
| Totals | 7,582,621 | 100.00% | 43 | 45 | +2 |

== Separate elections ==
One special election was held apart from those in November. The elected winner would serve the remainder of the incumbent Congress and face re-election in November.

| Date | District | Reason & Result | Candidates |
|---|---|---|---|
| July 13, 1982 | California 30 | George E. Danielson (D) resigned March 9, 1982. Democratic hold Winner was subsequently re-elected in November | Matthew G. Martinez (D); John H. Rousselot (R) |

== Results ==
Final results from the Clerk of the House of Representatives:

=== District 1 ===
California's 1st congressional district election, 1982
| Party | Candidate | Votes | % |
|---|---|---|---|
| Democratic | Douglas H. Bosco | 107,749 | 49.85 |
| Republican | Don H. Clausen (incumbent) | 102,043 | 47.21 |
| Libertarian | David Redick | 6,374 | 2.95 |
| Total votes | | 216,166 | 100.00 |
| Turnout | | | |
| Democratic gain from Republican | | | |

=== District 2 ===
California's 2nd congressional district election, 1982
| Party | Candidate | Votes | % |
|---|---|---|---|
| Republican | Eugene A. Chappie (incumbent) | 116,172 | 57.91 |
| Democratic | John Newmeyer | 81,314 | 40.53 |
| Peace and Freedom | Howard Fegarsky | 3,126 | 1.56 |
| Total votes | | 200,612 | 100.00 |
| Turnout | | | |
| Republican hold | | | |

=== District 3 ===
California's 3rd congressional district election, 1982
| Party | Candidate | Votes | % |
|---|---|---|---|
| Democratic | Robert Matsui (incumbent) | 194,680 | 89.63 |
| Libertarian | Bruce A. Daniel | 16,222 | 7.47 |
| Peace and Freedom | John Newmeyer | 6,294 | 2.90 |
| Total votes | | 217,196 | 100.00 |
| Turnout | | | |
| Democratic hold | | | |

=== District 4 ===
California's 4th congressional district election, 1982
| Party | Candidate | Votes | % |
|---|---|---|---|
| Democratic | Vic Fazio (incumbent) | 118,476 | 63.86 |
| Republican | Roger B. Canfield | 67,047 | 36.14 |
| Total votes | | 185,523 | 100.00 |
| Turnout | | | |
| Democratic hold | | | |

=== District 5 ===
California's 5th congressional district election, 1982
| Party | Candidate | Votes | % |
|---|---|---|---|
| Democratic | Phillip Burton (incumbent) | 103,268 | 57.91 |
| Republican | Milton Marks | 72,139 | 40.46 |
| Libertarian | Justin Raimondo | 2,904 | 1.63 |
| Total votes | | 178,311 | 100.00 |
| Turnout | | | |
| Democratic hold | | | |

=== District 6 ===
California's 6th congressional district election, 1982
| Party | Candidate | Votes | % |
|---|---|---|---|
| Democratic | Barbara Boxer | 96,379 | 52.36 |
| Republican | Dennis McQuaid | 82,128 | 44.62 |
| Libertarian | Howard C. Creighton | 3,191 | 1.73 |
| Peace and Freedom | Timothy Allen Albertson | 2,366 | 1.29 |
| Total votes | | 184,064 | 100.00 |
| Turnout | | | |
| Democratic hold | | | |

=== District 7 ===
California's 7th congressional district election, 1982
| Party | Candidate | Votes | % |
|---|---|---|---|
| Democratic | George Miller (incumbent) | 126,952 | 67.22 |
| Republican | Paul E. Vallely | 56,960 | 30.16 |
| Libertarian | Richard Newell | 2,752 | 1.46 |
| American Independent | Terry L. Wells | 2,205 | 1.17 |
| Total votes | | 188,869 | 100.00 |
| Turnout | | | |
| Democratic hold | | | |

=== District 8 ===
California's 8th congressional district election, 1982
| Party | Candidate | Votes | % |
|---|---|---|---|
| Democratic | Ronald Dellums (incumbent) | 121,537 | 55.95 |
| Republican | Claude B. Hutchinson Jr. | 95,694 | 44.05 |
| Total votes | | 217,231 | 100.00 |
| Turnout | | | |
| Democratic hold | | | |

=== District 9 ===
California's 9th congressional district election, 1982
| Party | Candidate | Votes | % |
|---|---|---|---|
| Democratic | Pete Stark (incumbent) | 104,393 | 60.66 |
| Republican | William J. "Bill" Kennedy | 67,702 | 39.34 |
| Total votes | | 172,095 | 100.00 |
| Turnout | | | |
| Democratic hold | | | |

=== District 10 ===
California's 10th congressional district election, 1982
| Party | Candidate | Votes | % |
|---|---|---|---|
| Democratic | Don Edwards (incumbent) | 77,263 | 62.67 |
| Republican | Bob Herriott | 41,506 | 33.67 |
| Libertarian | Dale Burrow | 2,403 | 1.95 |
| American Independent | Edmon V. Kaiser | 2,109 | 1.71 |
| Total votes | | 123,281 | 100.00 |
| Turnout | | | |
| Democratic hold | | | |

=== District 11 ===
California's 11th congressional district election, 1982
| Party | Candidate | Votes | % |
|---|---|---|---|
| Democratic | Tom Lantos (incumbent) | 109,812 | 57.08 |
| Republican | William Royer | 76,462 | 39.75 |
| Libertarian | Chuck Olson | 2,920 | 1.52 |
| Peace and Freedom | Wilson G. Branch | 1,928 | 1.00 |
| American Independent | Nicholas W. Kudrovzeff | 1,250 | 0.65 |
| Total votes | | 192,372 | 100.00 |
| Turnout | | | |
| Democratic hold | | | |

=== District 12 ===
California's 12th congressional district election, 1982
| Party | Candidate | Votes | % |
|---|---|---|---|
| Republican | Ed Zschau | 115,365 | 62.97 |
| Democratic | Emmett Lynch | 61,372 | 33.50 |
| Libertarian | William C. "Bill" White | 6,471 | 3.53 |
| Total votes | | 183,208 | 100.00 |
| Turnout | | | |
| Republican hold | | | |

=== District 13 ===
California's 13th congressional district election, 1982
| Party | Candidate | Votes | % |
|---|---|---|---|
| Democratic | Norm Mineta (incumbent) | 110,805 | 65.89 |
| Republican | Tom Kelly | 52,806 | 31.40 |
| Libertarian | Al Hinkle | 4,553 | 2.71 |
| Total votes | | 168,164 | 100.00 |
| Turnout | | | |
| Democratic hold | | | |

=== District 14 ===
California's 14th congressional district election, 1982
| Party | Candidate | Votes | % |
|---|---|---|---|
| Republican | Norman D. Shumway (incumbent) | 134,225 | 63.43 |
| Democratic | Baron Reed | 77,400 | 36.57 |
| Total votes | | 211,625 | 100.00 |
| Turnout | | | |
| Republican hold | | | |

=== District 15 ===
California's 15th congressional district election, 1982
| Party | Candidate | Votes | % |
|---|---|---|---|
| Democratic | Tony Coelho (incumbent) | 86,022 | 63.70 |
| Republican | Ed Bates | 45,948 | 34.02 |
| Libertarian | Stephen L. Gerringer | 3,073 | 2.28 |
| Total votes | | 135,043 | 100.00 |
| Turnout | | | |
| Democratic hold | | | |

=== District 16 ===
California's 16th congressional district election, 1982
| Party | Candidate | Votes | % |
|---|---|---|---|
| Democratic | Leon Panetta (incumbent) | 142,630 | 85.37 |
| Republican | Gary Richard Arnold | 24,448 | 14.63 |
| Total votes | | 167,078 | 100.00 |
| Turnout | | | |
| Democratic hold | | | |

=== District 17 ===
California's 17th congressional district election, 1982
| Party | Candidate | Votes | % |
|---|---|---|---|
| Republican | Charles (Chip) Pashayan (inc.) | 80,271 | 54.01 |
| Democratic | Gene Tackett | 68,364 | 45.99 |
| Total votes | | 148,635 | 100.00 |
| Turnout | | | |
| Republican hold | | | |

=== District 18 ===
California's 18th congressional district election, 1982
| Party | Candidate | Votes | % |
|---|---|---|---|
| Democratic | Richard Lehman | 92,762 | 59.49 |
| Republican | Adrian C. Fondse | 59,664 | 38.26 |
| Libertarian | Marshall William Fritz | 3,501 | 2.25 |
| Total votes | | 155,927 | 100.00 |
| Turnout | | | |
| Democratic win (new seat) | | | |

=== District 19 ===
California's 19th congressional district election, 1982
| Party | Candidate | Votes | % |
|---|---|---|---|
| Republican | Bob Lagomarsino (incumbent) | 112,486 | 61.05 |
| Democratic | Frank Frost | 66,042 | 35.84 |
| Libertarian | R. C. Gordon-McCutchan | 4,198 | 2.28 |
| Peace and Freedom | Charles J. Zekan | 1,520 | 0.82 |
| Total votes | | 184,246 | 100.00 |
| Turnout | | | |
| Republican hold | | | |

=== District 20 ===
California's 20th congressional district election, 1982
| Party | Candidate | Votes | % |
|---|---|---|---|
| Republican | Bill Thomas (incumbent) | 123,312 | 68.10 |
| Democratic | Robert J. Bethea | 57,769 | 31.90 |
| Total votes | | 181,081 | 100.00 |
| Turnout | | | |
| Republican hold | | | |

=== District 21 ===
California's 21st congressional district election, 1982
| Party | Candidate | Votes | % |
|---|---|---|---|
| Republican | Bobbi Fiedler (incumbent) | 138,474 | 71.83 |
| Democratic | George Henry Margolis | 46,412 | 24.08 |
| Libertarian | Daniel Wiener | 7,881 | 4.09 |
| Total votes | | 192,767 | 100.00 |
| Turnout | | | |
| Republican hold | | | |

=== District 22 ===
California's 22nd congressional district election, 1982
| Party | Candidate | Votes | % |
|---|---|---|---|
| Republican | Carlos J. Moorhead (incumbent) | 145,831 | 73.57 |
| Democratic | Harvey L. Goldhammer | 46,521 | 23.47 |
| Libertarian | Robert T. Gerringer | 5,870 | 2.96 |
| Total votes | | 198,222 | 100.00 |
| Turnout | | | |
| Republican hold | | | |

=== District 23 ===
California's 23rd congressional district election, 1982
| Party | Candidate | Votes | % |
|---|---|---|---|
| Democratic | Anthony C. Beilenson (incumbent) | 120,788 | 59.55 |
| Republican | David Armor | 82,031 | 40.45 |
| Total votes | | 202,819 | 100.00 |
| Turnout | | | |
| Democratic hold | | | |

=== District 24 ===
California's 24th congressional district election, 1982
| Party | Candidate | Votes | % |
|---|---|---|---|
| Democratic | Henry Waxman (incumbent) | 88,516 | 65.05 |
| Republican | Jerry Zerg | 42,133 | 30.96 |
| Libertarian | Jeff Mandel | 5,420 | 3.98 |
| Total votes | | 136,069 | 100.00 |
| Turnout | | | |
| Democratic hold | | | |

=== District 25 ===
California's 25th congressional district election, 1982
| Party | Candidate | Votes | % |
|---|---|---|---|
| Democratic | Edward R. Roybal (incumbent) | 71,106 | 84.50 |
| Libertarian | Daniel John Gorham | 12,060 | 14.50 |
| Total votes | | 83,166 | 100.00 |
| Turnout | | | |
| Democratic hold | | | |

=== District 26 ===
California's 26th congressional district election, 1982
| Party | Candidate | Votes | % |
|---|---|---|---|
| Democratic | Howard Berman | 97,383 | 59.58 |
| Republican | Hal Phillips | 66,072 | 40.42 |
| Total votes | | 163,455 | 100.00 |
| Turnout | | | |
| Democratic gain from Republican | | | |

=== District 27 ===
California's 27th congressional district election, 1982
| Party | Candidate | Votes | % |
|---|---|---|---|
| Democratic | Mel Levine | 108,347 | 59.46 |
| Republican | Bart W. Christensen | 67,479 | 37.03 |
| Libertarian | ZacK Richardson | 6,391 | 3.51 |
| Total votes | | 182,217 | 100.00 |
| Turnout | | | |
| Democratic gain from Republican | | | |

=== District 28 ===
California's 28th congressional district election, 1982
| Party | Candidate | Votes | % |
|---|---|---|---|
| Democratic | Julian C. Dixon (incumbent) | 103,469 | 78.89 |
| Republican | David Goerz | 24,473 | 18.66 |
| Libertarian | David W. Meleney | 3,210 | 2.45 |
| Total votes | | 131,152 | 100.00 |
| Turnout | | | |
| Democratic hold | | | |

=== District 29 ===
California's 29th congressional district election, 1982
| Party | Candidate | Votes | % |
|---|---|---|---|
| Democratic | Augustus F. Hawkins (incumbent) | 97,028 | 79.80 |
| Republican | Milton R. Mackaig | 24,568 | 20.20 |
| Total votes | | 121,596 | 100.00 |
| Turnout | | | |
| Democratic hold | | | |

=== District 30 ===
California's 30th congressional district election, 1982
| Party | Candidate | Votes | % |
|---|---|---|---|
| Democratic | Matthew G. Martinez | 60,905 | 53.86 |
| Republican | John H. Rousselot (incumbent) | 52,177 | 46.14 |
| Total votes | | 113,082 | 100.00 |
| Turnout | | | |
| Democratic gain from Republican | | | |

=== District 31 ===
California's 31st congressional district election, 1982
| Party | Candidate | Votes | % |
|---|---|---|---|
| Democratic | Mervyn M. Dymally (incumbent) | 86,718 | 72.41 |
| Republican | Henry C. Minturn | 33,043 | 27.59 |
| Total votes | | 119,761 | 100.00 |
| Turnout | | | |
| Democratic hold | | | |

=== District 32 ===
California's 32nd congressional district election, 1982
| Party | Candidate | Votes | % |
|---|---|---|---|
| Democratic | Glenn M. Anderson (incumbent) | 84,663 | 57.99 |
| Republican | Brian J. Lungren | 57,863 | 39.63 |
| Peace and Freedom | Eugene E. Ryle | 3,473 | 2.38 |
| Total votes | | 145,999 | 100.00 |
| Turnout | | | |
| Democratic hold | | | |

=== District 33 ===
California's 33rd congressional district election, 1982
| Party | Candidate | Votes | % |
|---|---|---|---|
| Republican | David Dreier (incumbent) | 112,362 | 65.19 |
| Democratic | Paul Servelle | 55,514 | 32.21 |
| Libertarian | Phillips B. Franklin | 2,251 | 1.31 |
| Peace and Freedom | James Michael "Mike" Noonan | 2,223 | 1.29 |
| Total votes | | 172,350 | 100.00 |
| Turnout | | | |
| Republican hold | | | |

=== District 34 ===
California's 34th congressional district election, 1982
| Party | Candidate | Votes | % |
|---|---|---|---|
| Democratic | Esteban Torres | 68,316 | 57.24 |
| Republican | Paul R. Jackson | 51,026 | 42.76 |
| Total votes | | 119,342 | 100.00 |
| Turnout | | | |
| Democratic hold | | | |

=== District 35 ===
California's 35th congressional district election, 1982
| Party | Candidate | Votes | % |
|---|---|---|---|
| Republican | Jerry Lewis (incumbent) | 112,786 | 68.30 |
| Democratic | Robert E. Erwin | 52,349 | 31.70 |
| Total votes | | 165,135 | 100.00 |
| Turnout | | | |
| Republican hold | | | |

=== District 36 ===
California's 36th congressional district election, 1982
| Party | Candidate | Votes | % |
|---|---|---|---|
| Democratic | George Brown, Jr. (incumbent) | 76,546 | 54.32 |
| Republican | John Paul Stark | 64,361 | 45.68 |
| Total votes | | 140,907 | 100.00 |
| Turnout | | | |
| Democratic hold | | | |

=== District 37 ===
California's 37th congressional district election, 1982
| Party | Candidate | Votes | % |
|---|---|---|---|
| Republican | Al McCandless | 105,065 | 59.07 |
| Democratic | Curtis R. "Sam" Cross | 68,510 | 38.52 |
| Libertarian | Marc R. Wruble | 4,297 | 2.42 |
| Total votes | | 177,872 | 100.00 |
| Turnout | | | |
| Republican hold | | | |

=== District 38 ===
California's 38th congressional district election, 1982
| Party | Candidate | Votes | % |
|---|---|---|---|
| Democratic | Jerry M. Patterson (incumbent) | 73,914 | 52.35 |
| Republican | William F. "Bill" Dohr | 61,279 | 43.40 |
| Libertarian | Anita K. Barr | 5,989 | 4.24 |
| Total votes | | 141,182 | 100.00 |
| Turnout | | | |
| Democratic hold | | | |

=== District 39 ===
California's 39th congressional district election, 1982
| Party | Candidate | Votes | % |
|---|---|---|---|
| Republican | William E. Dannemeyer (incumbent) | 129,539 | 72.22 |
| Democratic | Frank G. Verges | 46,681 | 26.02 |
| Libertarian | Frank Boeheim | 3,152 | 1.76 |
| Total votes | | 179,372 | 100.00 |
| Turnout | | | |
| Republican hold | | | |

=== District 40 ===
California's 40th congressional district election, 1982
| Party | Candidate | Votes | % |
|---|---|---|---|
| Republican | Robert Badham (incumbent) | 144,228 | 71.54 |
| Democratic | Paul Hasenman | 52,546 | 26.06 |
| Peace and Freedom | Maxine Bell Quirk | 4,826 | 2.39 |
| Total votes | | 201,600 | 100.00 |
| Turnout | | | |
| Republican hold | | | |

=== District 41 ===
California's 41st congressional district election, 1982
| Party | Candidate | Votes | % |
|---|---|---|---|
| Republican | Bill Lowery (incumbent) | 140,130 | 68.87 |
| Democratic | Tony Brandenburg | 58,677 | 28.84 |
| Libertarian | Everett Hale | 4,654 | 2.29 |
| Total votes | | 203,461 | 100.00 |
| Turnout | | | |
| Republican hold | | | |

=== District 42 ===
California's 42nd congressional district election, 1982
| Party | Candidate | Votes | % |
|---|---|---|---|
| Republican | Dan Lungren (incumbent) | 142,845 | 68.99 |
| Democratic | James P. Spellman | 58,690 | 28.35 |
| Peace and Freedom | John S. Donohue | 5,514 | 2.66 |
| Total votes | | 207,049 | 100.00 |
| Turnout | | | |
| Republican hold | | | |

=== District 43 ===
California's 43rd congressional district election, 1982
| Party | Candidate | Votes | % |
|---|---|---|---|
| Republican | Ron Packard (write-in) | 66,444 | 36.76 |
| Democratic | Roy Pat Archer | 57,995 | 32.09 |
| Republican | Johnnie R. Crean | 56,297 | 31.15 |
| Total votes | | 180,736 | 100.00 |
| Turnout | | | |
| Republican win (new seat) | | | |

=== District 44 ===
California's 44th congressional district election, 1982
| Party | Candidate | Votes | % |
|---|---|---|---|
| Democratic | Jim Bates | 78,474 | 64.95 |
| Republican | Shirley M. Gissendanner | 38,447 | 31.82 |
| Libertarian | Jim Conole | 3,904 | 3.23 |
| Total votes | | 120,825 | 100.00 |
| Turnout | | | |
| Democratic win (new seat) | | | |

=== District 45 ===
California's 45th congressional district election, 1982
| Party | Candidate | Votes | % |
|---|---|---|---|
| Republican | Duncan Hunter (incumbent) | 117,771 | 68.57 |
| Democratic | Richard Hill | 50,148 | 29.20 |
| Libertarian | Jack R. Sanders | 3,839 | 2.24 |
| Total votes | | 171,758 | 100.00 |
| Turnout | | | |
| Republican hold | | | |

== See also ==
- 98th United States Congress
- Political party strength in California
- Political party strength in U.S. states
- 1982 United States House of Representatives elections
