= 1986 United States House of Representatives elections in California =

- November 4, 1986

All 45 California seats to the United States House of Representatives
	Majority party	Minority party
Party	Democratic	Republican
Last election	27	18
Seats won	27	18
Seat change	Steady	Steady
Popular vote	3,793,542	3,328,109
Percentage	52.32%	45.90%
- Results: Democratic hold Republican hold

The United States House of Representatives elections in California of 1986 was an election for California's delegation to the United States House of Representatives, which occurred as part of the general election of the House of Representatives on November 4, 1986. No districts switched parties, so the delegation remained at 27 Democrats and 18 Republicans.

== Overview ==
United States HoR elections in California, 1986
Party	Votes	%	Seats
Democratic	3,793,542	52.32%	27
Republican	3,328,109	45.90%	18
Libertarian	71,448	0.99%	0
Peace and Freedom	57,003	0.79%	0
Totals	7,250,102	100.00%	45

== Results ==
Final results from the clerk of the House of Representatives:

=== District 1 ===
California's 1st congressional district election, 1986
Party	Candidate	Votes	%
Democratic	Douglas H. Bosco (incumbent)	138,174	67.48
Republican	Floyd G. Sampson	54,436	26.59
Peace and Freedom	Elden McFarland	12,149	5.93
Total votes		204,759	100.00
Turnout			
Democratic hold			

=== District 2 ===
California's 2nd congressional district election, 1986
Party	Candidate	Votes	%
Republican	Wally Herger	109,758	58.25
Democratic	Stephen C. Swendiman	74,602	39.59
Libertarian	Harry Hugh "Doc" Pendery	4,054	2.15
Total votes		188,414	100.00
Turnout			
Republican hold			

=== District 3 ===
California's 3rd congressional district election, 1986
Party	Candidate	Votes	%
Democratic	Robert Matsui (incumbent)	158,709	75.95
Republican	Lowell Patrick Landowski	50,265	24.05
Total votes		208,974	100.00
Turnout			
Democratic hold			

=== District 4 ===
California's 4th congressional district election, 1986
Party	Candidate	Votes	%
Democratic	Vic Fazio (incumbent)	128,364	70.16
Republican	Jack D. Hite	54,596	29.84
Total votes		182,960	100.00
Turnout			
Democratic hold			

=== District 5 ===
California's 5th congressional district election, 1986
Party	Candidate	Votes	%
Democratic	Sala Burton (incumbent)	122,688	75.17
Republican	Mike Garza	36,039	22.08
Libertarian	Samuel K. "Sam" Grove	2,409	1.48
Peace and Freedom	Theodore Adrian "Ted" Zuur	2,078	1.27
Total votes		163,214	100.00
Turnout			
Democratic hold			

=== District 6 ===
California's 6th congressional district election, 1986
Party	Candidate	Votes	%
Democratic	Barbara Boxer (incumbent)	142,946	73.85
Republican	Franklin "Harry" Ernst III	50,606	26.15
Total votes		193,552	100.00
Turnout			
Democratic hold			

=== District 7 ===
California's 7th congressional district election, 1986
Party	Candidate	Votes	%
Democratic	George Miller (incumbent)	124,174	66.56
Republican	Rosemary Thaker	62,379	33.44
Total votes		186,553	100.00
Turnout			
Democratic hold			

=== District 8 ===
California's 8th congressional district election, 1986
Party	Candidate	Votes	%
Democratic	Ronald Dellums (incumbent)	121,790	60.01
Republican	Steven Eigenberg	76,850	37.87
Peace and Freedom	Lawrence R. Manuel	4,295	2.12
Total votes		202,935	100.00
Turnout			
Democratic hold			

=== District 9 ===
California's 9th congressional district election, 1986
Party	Candidate	Votes	%
Democratic	Pete Stark (incumbent)	113,490	69.72
Republican	David M. "Dave" Williams	49,300	30.28
Total votes		162,790	100.00
Turnout			
Democratic hold			

=== District 10 ===
California's 10th congressional district election, 1986
Party	Candidate	Votes	%
Democratic	Don Edwards (incumbent)	84,240	70.46
Republican	Michael R. La Crone	31,826	26.62
Libertarian	Perr Cardestam	1,797	1.50
Peace and Freedom	Bradley L. Mayer	1,701	1.42
Total votes		119,564	100.00
Turnout			
Democratic hold			

=== District 11 ===
California's 11th congressional district election, 1986
Party	Candidate	Votes	%
Democratic	Tom Lantos (incumbent)	112,380	74.08
Republican	Bill Quarishi	39,315	25.92
Total votes		151,695	100.00
Turnout			
Democratic hold			

=== District 12 ===
California's 12th congressional district election, 1986
Party	Candidate	Votes	%
Republican	Ernie Konnyu	111,252	59.48
Democratic	Lance T. Weil	69,564	37.19
Libertarian	William C. "Bill" White	6,227	3.33
Total votes		187,043	100.00
Turnout			
Republican hold			

=== District 13 ===
California's 13th congressional district election, 1986
Party	Candidate	Votes	%
Democratic	Norm Mineta (incumbent)	107,696	69.73
Republican	Bob Nash	46,754	30.27
Total votes		154,450	100.00
Turnout			
Democratic hold			

=== District 14 ===
California's 14th congressional district election, 1986
Party	Candidate	Votes	%
Republican	Norman D. Shumway (incumbent)	146,906	71.61
Democratic	Bill Steele	53,597	26.12
Libertarian	Bruce A. Daniel	4,658	2.27
Total votes		205,161	100.00
Turnout			
Republican hold			

=== District 15 ===
California's 15th congressional district election, 1986
Party	Candidate	Votes	%
Democratic	Tony Coelho (incumbent)	93,600	71.03
Republican	Carol Harner	35,793	27.16
Libertarian	Richard M. Harris	2,382	1.81
Total votes		131,775	100.00
Turnout			
Democratic hold			

=== District 16 ===
California's 16th congressional district election, 1986
Party	Candidate	Votes	%
Democratic	Leon Panetta (incumbent)	128,151	78.38
Republican	Louis Darrigo	31,386	19.20
Peace and Freedom	Ron Wright	2,017	1.23
Libertarian	Bill Anderson	1,944	1.19
Total votes		163,498	100.00
Turnout			
Democratic hold			

=== District 17 ===
California's 17th congressional district election, 1986
Party	Candidate	Votes	%
Republican	Charles (Chip) Pashayan (inc.)	88,787	60.21
Democratic	John Hartnett	58,682	39.79
Total votes		147,469	100.00
Turnout			
Republican hold			

=== District 18 ===
California's 18th congressional district election, 1986
Party	Candidate	Votes	%
Democratic	Richard Lehman (incumbent)	101,480	71.27
Republican	David C. Crevelt	40,907	28.73
Total votes		142,387	100.00
Turnout			
Democratic hold			

=== District 19 ===
California's 19th congressional district election, 1986
Party	Candidate	Votes	%
Republican	Bob Lagomarsino (incumbent)	122,578	71.88
Democratic	Wayne B. Norris	45,619	26.75
Libertarian	George Hasara	2,341	1.37
Total votes		170,538	100.00
Turnout			
Republican hold			

=== District 20 ===
California's 20th congressional district election, 1986
Party	Candidate	Votes	%
Republican	Bill Thomas (incumbent)	129,989	72.61
Democratic	Jules H. Moquin	49,027	27.39
Total votes		179,016	100.00
Turnout			
Republican hold			

=== District 21 ===
California's 21st congressional district election, 1986
Party	Candidate	Votes	%
Republican	Elton Gallegly	132,090	68.41
Democratic	Gilbert R. Saldana	54,497	28.22
Libertarian	Daniel Wiener	6,504	3.37
Total votes		193,091	100.00
Turnout			
Republican hold			

=== District 22 ===
California's 22nd congressional district election, 1986
Party	Candidate	Votes	%
Republican	Carlos J. Moorhead (incumbent)	141,096	73.80
Democratic	John G. Simmons	44,036	23.03
Libertarian	Jona Joy Bergland	3,114	1.63
Peace and Freedom	Joel Lorimer	2,930	1.53
Total votes		191,176	100.00
Turnout			
Republican hold			

=== District 23 ===
California's 23rd congressional district election, 1986
Party	Candidate	Votes	%
Democratic	Anthony C. Beilenson (incumbent)	121,468	65.75
Republican	George Woolverton	58,746	31.80
Peace and Freedom	Tom Hopke	2,521	1.36
Libertarian	Taylor Rhodes	2,019	1.09
Total votes		184,754	100.00
Turnout			
Democratic hold			

=== District 24 ===
California's 24th congressional district election, 1986
Party	Candidate	Votes	%
Democratic	Henry Waxman (incumbent)	103,914	87.93
Libertarian	George Abrahams	8,871	7.51
Peace and Freedom	James Green	5,388	4.56
Total votes		118,173	100.00
Turnout			
Democratic hold			

=== District 25 ===
California's 25th congressional district election, 1986
Party	Candidate	Votes	%
Democratic	Edward R. Roybal (incumbent)	62,692	76.07
Republican	Gregory L. Hardy	17,558	21.30
Libertarian	Ted Brown	2,163	2.62
Total votes		82,413	100.00
Turnout			
Democratic hold			

=== District 26 ===
California's 26th congressional district election, 1986
Party	Candidate	Votes	%
Democratic	Howard Berman (incumbent)	98,091	65.07
Republican	Robert M. Kerns	52,662	34.93
Total votes		150,753	100.00
Turnout			
Democratic hold			

=== District 27 ===
California's 27th congressional district election, 1986
Party	Candidate	Votes	%
Democratic	Mel Levine (incumbent)	110,403	63.70
Republican	Rob Scribner	59,410	34.28
Peace and Freedom	Thomas L. O'Connor, Jr.	2,078	1.20
Libertarian	Larry Leathers	1,429	0.82
Total votes		173,320	100.00
Turnout			
Democratic hold			

=== District 28 ===
California's 28th congressional district election, 1986
Party	Candidate	Votes	%
Democratic	Julian C. Dixon (incumbent)	92,635	76.35
Republican	George Zaldivar Adams	25,858	21.31
Libertarian	Howard Johnson	2,837	2.34
Total votes		121,330	100.00
Turnout			
Democratic hold			

=== District 29 ===
California's 29th congressional district election, 1986
Party	Candidate	Votes	%
Democratic	Augustus F. Hawkins (incumbent)	78,132	84.54
Republican	John Van de Brooke	13,432	14.53
Libertarian	Waheed R. Boctor	851	0.92
Total votes		92,415	100.00
Turnout			
Democratic hold			

=== District 30 ===
California's 30th congressional district election, 1986
Party	Candidate	Votes	%
Democratic	Matthew G. Martinez (incumbent)	59,369	62.50
Republican	John W. Almquist	33,705	35.48
Libertarian	Kim J. Goldsworthy	1,911	2.01
Total votes		94,985	100.00
Turnout			
Democratic hold			

=== District 31 ===
California's 31st congressional district election, 1986
Party	Candidate	Votes	%
Democratic	Mervyn M. Dymally (incumbent)	77,126	70.25
Republican	Jack McMurray	30,322	27.62
Peace and Freedom	B. Kwaku Duren	2,333	2.13
Total votes		109,781	100.00
Turnout			
Democratic hold			

=== District 32 ===
California's 32nd congressional district election, 1986
Party	Candidate	Votes	%
Democratic	Glenn M. Anderson (incumbent)	90,739	68.46
Republican	Joyce M. Robertson	39,003	29.43
Peace and Freedom	John S. Donohue	2,799	2.11
Total votes		132,541	100.00
Turnout			
Democratic hold			

=== District 33 ===
California's 33rd congressional district election, 1986
Party	Candidate	Votes	%
Republican	David Dreier (incumbent)	118,541	71.69
Democratic	Monty Hempel	44,312	26.80
Peace and Freedom	James Michael "Mike" Noonan	2,500	1.51
Total votes		165,353	100.00
Turnout			
Republican hold			

=== District 34 ===
California's 34th congressional district election, 1986
Party	Candidate	Votes	%
Democratic	Esteban Torres (incumbent)	66,404	60.33
Republican	Charles M. House	43,659	39.67
Total votes		110,063	100.00
Turnout			
Democratic hold			

=== District 35 ===
California's 35th congressional district election, 1986
Party	Candidate	Votes	%
Republican	Jerry Lewis (incumbent)	127,235	76.85
Democratic	Robert J. "Sarge" Hall	38,322	23.15
Total votes		165,557	100.00
Turnout			
Republican hold			

=== District 36 ===
California's 36th congressional district election, 1986
Party	Candidate	Votes	%
Democratic	George Brown, Jr. (incumbent)	78,118	57.11
Republican	Robert L. "Bob" Henley	58,660	42.89
Total votes		136,778	100.00
Turnout			
Democratic hold			

=== District 37 ===
California's 37th congressional district election, 1986
Party	Candidate	Votes	%
Republican	Al McCandless (incumbent)	122,416	63.68
Democratic	David E. "Dave" Skinner	69,808	36.32
Total votes		192,224	100.00
Turnout			
Republican hold			

=== District 38 ===
California's 38th congressional district election, 1986
Party	Candidate	Votes	%
Republican	Bob Dornan (incumbent)	66,032	55.27
Democratic	Richard H. Robinson	50,625	42.38
Libertarian	Lee Connelly	2,807	2.35
Total votes		119,464	100.00
Turnout			
Republican hold			

=== District 39 ===
California's 39th congressional district election, 1986
Party	Candidate	Votes	%
Republican	William E. Dannemeyer (incumbent)	131,603	74.46
Democratic	David D. Vest	42,377	23.98
Peace and Freedom	Frank Boeheim	2,752	1.56
Total votes		176,732	100.00
Turnout			
Republican hold			

=== District 40 ===
California's 40th congressional district election, 1986
Party	Candidate	Votes	%
Republican	Robert Badham (incumbent)	119,829	59.76
Democratic	Bruce W. Sumner	75,664	37.73
Peace and Freedom	Steve Sears	5,025	2.51
Total votes		200,518	100.00
Turnout			
Republican hold			

=== District 41 ===
California's 41st congressional district election, 1986
Party	Candidate	Votes	%
Republican	Bill Lowery (incumbent)	133,566	67.83
Democratic	Daniel F. "Dan" Kripke	59,816	30.38
Libertarian	Richard "Dick" Rider	3,541	1.80
Total votes		196,923	100.00
Turnout			
Republican hold			

=== District 42 ===
California's 42nd congressional district election, 1986
Party	Candidate	Votes	%
Republican	Dan Lungren (incumbent)	140,364	72.84
Democratic	Michael P. Blackburn	47,586	24.69
Peace and Freedom	Kate McClatchy	4,761	2.47
Total votes		192,711	100.00
Turnout			
Republican hold			

=== District 43 ===
California's 43rd congressional district election, 1986
Party	Candidate	Votes	%
Republican	Ron Packard (incumbent)	137,341	73.14
Democratic	Joseph Chirra	45,078	24.00
Libertarian	Phyllis Avery	5,370	2.86
Total votes		187,789	100.00
Turnout			
Republican hold			

=== District 44 ===
California's 44th congressional district election, 1986
Party	Candidate	Votes	%
Democratic	Jim Bates (incumbent)	70,557	64.24
Republican	Bill Mitchell	36,359	33.10
Peace and Freedom	Shirley Rachel Issacson	1,676	1.53
Libertarian	Dennis Thompson	1,244	1.13
Total votes		109,836	100.00
Turnout			
Democratic hold			

=== District 45 ===
California's 45th congressional district election, 1986
Party	Candidate	Votes	%
Republican	Duncan Hunter (incumbent)	118,900	58.09
Democratic	Hewitt Fitts Ryan	82,800	40.45
Libertarian	Lee Schwartz	2,975	1.45
Total votes		204,675	100.00
Turnout			
Republican hold			

== See also ==
- 100th United States Congress
- Political party strength in California
- Political party strength in U.S. states
- 1986 United States House of Representatives elections
