= California's 42nd congressional district =

U.S. House district for California

Coordinates: 33.6°N 117.3°W

- Interactive map of district boundaries
- Representative: Robert Garcia; D–Long Beach
- Population (2025): 715,983
- Median household income: $87,793
- Ethnicity: 64.5% Hispanic; 18.1% White; 7.6% Asian; 6.2% Black; 2.6% Two or more races; 1.0% other
- Cook PVI: D+18

California's 42nd congressional district is a U.S. congressional district in California. The district is currently represented by Democrat Robert Garcia.

The 42nd district is located within Orange County and Los Angeles County, and is centered around Long Beach and its surrounding suburbs.

== Recent election results from statewide races ==
=== 2023–2027 boundaries ===
Year	Office	Results
2008	President	Obama 69% - 30%
2010	Governor	Brown 62% - 32%
2010	Lt. Governor	Newsom 57% - 32%
2010	Secretary of State	Bowen 61% - 29%
2010	Attorney General	Harris 53% - 39%
2010	Treasurer	Lockyer 64% - 28%
2010	Controller	Chiang 61% - 29%
2012	President	Obama 72% - 28%
2014	Governor	Brown 65% - 35%
2016	President	Clinton 72% - 22%
2018	Governor	Newsom 72% - 28%
2018	Attorney General	Becerra 74% - 26%
2020	President	Biden 72% - 26%
2022	Senate (Reg.)	Padilla 69% - 31%
2022	Governor	Newsom 67% - 33%
2022	Lt. Governor	Kounalakis 67% - 33%
2022	Secretary of State	Weber 67% - 33%
2022	Attorney General	Bonta 67% - 33%
2022	Treasurer	Ma 65% - 35%
2022	Controller	Cohen 63% - 37%
2024	President	Harris 64% - 32%
2024	Senate (Reg.)	Schiff 65% - 35%

=== 2027–2033 boundaries ===
Year	Office	Results
2008	President	Obama 69% - 30%
2010	Governor	Brown 62% - 32%
2010	Lt. Governor	Newsom 57% - 32%
2010	Secretary of State	Bowen 61% - 29%
2010	Attorney General	Harris 53% - 39%
2010	Treasurer	Lockyer 64% - 28%
2010	Controller	Chiang 61% - 29%
2012	President	Obama 72% - 28%
2014	Governor	Brown 65% - 35%
2016	President	Clinton 72% - 22%
2018	Governor	Newsom 72% - 28%
2018	Attorney General	Becerra 74% - 26%
2020	President	Biden 72% - 26%
2022	Senate (Reg.)	Padilla 69% - 31%
2022	Governor	Newsom 67% - 33%
2022	Lt. Governor	Kounalakis 67% - 33%
2022	Secretary of State	Weber 67% - 33%
2022	Attorney General	Bonta 67% - 33%
2022	Treasurer	Ma 65% - 35%
2022	Controller	Cohen 63% - 37%
2024	President	Harris 64% - 32%
2024	Senate (Reg.)	Schiff 65% - 35%

== Composition ==
FIPS County Code	County	Seat	Population
37	Los Angeles	Los Angeles	9,663,345

Under the 2020 redistricting, California's 42nd congressional district has been geographically shifted to the South Bay region of Los Angeles County. It also takes in two of the Channel Islands: Santa Catalina and San Clemente, in the Southern California Bight. The district also includes the cities of Huntington Park, Bell, Bell Gardens, Maywood, Signal Hill, Vernon, Cudahy, Commerce, south Long Beach, east side Lakewood, most of Downey and Bellflower; and the census-designated places Florence-Graham and Walnut Park.

Los Angeles County is split between this district, the 34th district, the 37th district, the 38th district, the 45th district, the 44th district, the 47th district, and the 43rd district. The 42nd, 34th and 38th are partitioned by S Gerhart Ave, Simmons Ave, Dewar Ave, W Beverly Blvd, Repetto Ave, Allston St, S Concourse Ave, Ferguson Dr, Simmons Ave/S Gerhart Ave, Highway 72, Goodrich Blvd, Telegraph Rd, S Marianna Ave, Noakes St, S Bonnie Beach Pl, Union Pacific Ave, S Indiana St, Union Pacific Railroad, Holabird Ave, S Grande Vista Ave, AT & SF Railway, Harriet St, and E 25th St.

The 42nd, 37th, and 43rd are partitioned by S Alameda St, E Slauson Ave, S Central Ave, Firestone Blvd-E 90 St, S Central Ave, E 103rd St, Success Ave, E 92nd St, E 91st, Croesus Ave, and E 97th St.

The 42nd, 38th, 45th, and 47th are partitioned by Yates Ave, E Acco St, 6866 E Washington Blvd-2808 Vail Ave, S 14th St, AT & SF Railway, Church Rd, Telegraph Rd, Rio Hondo River, Veterans Memorial Park, Suva St, Guatemala Ave, Shady Oak Dr, Coolgrove Dr, Gallatin Rd, Samoline Ave, Paramount Blvd, Arrington Ave, Suva St, Charloma Dr, Lubet St, Highway 5, San Gabriel River, Palo Verde Ave, South St, Del Amo Blvd, Pioneer Blvd, Coyote Creek, Centralia Creek, Hawaiian Ave, Verne Ave, Bloomfield Park, Highway 605, 226th St, Dorado Cir, Cortner Ave, E Woodson St, Bloomfield Ave, Lilly Ave, Marna Ave, Los Alamos Channel, and the San Gabriel Bike Path.

The 42nd and 44th are partitioned by S Alameda St, Southern Pacific Railroad, Ardmore Ave, Long Beach Blvd, Pacific Blvd, Cudahy St, 2622 Cudahy St-3211 Santa Ana St, Santa Ana St, Salt Lake Ave, Patata St, 7038 Dinwiddie St-10112 Karmont Ave, Imperial Highway, Old River School Rd, Union Pacific Railroad, Gardendale St, Century Blvd, Highway 19. Laurel St, Clark Ave, Beach St, Bellflower Blvd, E Carson St, Woodruff Ave, Gonda Ave, E Wardlow Rd, N Los Coyotes Diagonal, McNab Ave, E Spring St, E Harvey Way, Faculty Ave, E Carson St, Norse Way, Lakewood Golf Course, Cover St, E 36th St, Cherry Ave, Atlantic Ave, E Willow St, Long Beach Blvd, Highway 1, Oregon Ave, W Anaheim St, Los Angeles River, Canal Ave, W 19th St, Santa Fe Ave, Seabright Ave, W 25th St, W Willow St, Middle Rd-East Rd, 2300 E Pacific Coast Highway-W Anaheim St, E Anaheim St-Cerritos Channel, Piers S Ave, Highway 47, and Navy Mole Rd.

=== Cities and CDPs with 10,000 or more people ===
- Long Beach – 466,742
- Downey – 114,355
- Lakewood – 82,496
- Bellflower – 79,190
- Florence-Graham – 61,983
- Huntington Park – 52,633
- Bell Gardens – 39,501
- Bell – 33,559
- Maywood – 25,138
- Cudahy – 22,811
- Walnut Park – 15,214
- Commerce – 12,378
- Signal Hill – 11,848

== Future composition ==
Beginning with the 2026 election, the 42nd district will consist of the following counties:

- Los Angeles (part)
- Orange (part)

== List of members representing the district ==
Member	Party	Dates	Cong ress(es)	Electoral history	Counties
District created January 3, 1973
Clair Burgener (Rancho Santa Fe)	Republican	January 3, 1973 – January 3, 1975	93rd	Elected in 1972. Redistricted to the 43rd district.	1973–1975; Southern Coastal Orange, Coastal San Diego outside the city
Lionel Van Deerlin (Chula Vista)	Democratic	January 3, 1975 – January 3, 1981	94th 95th 96th	Redistricted from the 41st district and re-elected in 1974. Re-elected in 1976. Re-elected in 1978. Lost re-election.	1975–1983; San Diego (San Diego City southern half)
Duncan Hunter (Coronado)	Republican	January 3, 1981 – January 3, 1983	97th	Elected in 1980. Redistricted to the 45th district.	1975–1983; San Diego (San Diego City southern half)
Dan Lungren (Long Beach)	Republican	January 3, 1983 – January 3, 1989	98th 99th 100th	Redistricted from the 34th district and re-elected in 1982. Re-elected in 1984. Re-elected in 1986. Resigned when appointed California State Treasurer.	1983–1993; Los Angeles (Palos Verdes), Northwestern Orange
Dana Rohrabacher (Long Beach)	Republican	January 3, 1989 – January 3, 1993	101st 102nd	Elected in 1988. Re-elected in 1990. Redistricted to the 45th district.	1983–1993; Los Angeles (Palos Verdes), Northwestern Orange
George Brown Jr. (San Bernardino)	Democratic	January 3, 1993 – July 15, 1999	103rd 104th 105th 106th	Redistricted from the 36th district and re-elected in 1992. Re-elected in 1994. Re-elected in 1996. Re-elected in 1998. Died.	1993–2003; San Bernardino (Inland Empire)
Vacant		July 15, 1999 – November 16, 1999	106th		1993–2003; San Bernardino (Inland Empire)
Joe Baca (Fontana)	Democratic	November 16, 1999 – January 3, 2003	106th 107th	Elected to finish Brown's term. Re-elected in 2000. Redistricted to the 43rd district.	1993–2003; San Bernardino (Inland Empire)
Gary Miller (Diamond Bar)	Republican	January 3, 2003 – January 3, 2013	108th 109th 110th 111th 112th	Redistricted from the 41st district and re-elected in 2002. Re-elected in 2004. Re-elected in 2006. Re-elected in 2008. Re-elected in 2010. Redistricted to the 31st district.	2003–2013 Southeastern Los Angeles, Northeastern Orange, Southwestern San Bernardino
Ken Calvert (Corona)	Republican	January 3, 2013 – January 3, 2023	113th 114th 115th 116th 117th	Redistricted from the 44th district and re-elected in 2012. Re-elected in 2014. Re-elected in 2016. Re-elected in 2018. Re-elected in 2020. Redistricted to the 41st district.	2013–2023 Inland Empire (Corona and Murrieta)
Robert Garcia (Long Beach)	Democratic	January 3, 2023 – present	118th 119th	Elected in 2022. Re-elected in 2024. Re-elected in 2026.	2023–present Southern Los Angeles

== Election results ==
=== 1972 ===
1972 United States House of Representatives elections in California
Party	Candidate	Votes	%
Republican	Clair Burgener (Incumbent)	155,965	67.4
Democratic	Bob Lowe	67,477	29.2
American Independent	Armin R. Moths	7,812	3.4
Total votes		231,254	100.0
Republican win (new seat)			

=== 1974 ===
1974 United States House of Representatives elections in California
Party	Candidate	Votes	%
Democratic	Lionel Van Deerlin (Incumbent)	69,746	69.9
Republican	Wes Marden	30,058	30.1
Total votes		99,804	100.0
Democratic hold			

=== 1976 ===
1976 United States House of Representatives elections in California
Party	Candidate	Votes	%
Democratic	Lionel Van Deerlin (Incumbent)	103,062	76.0
Republican	Wes Marden	32,565	24.0
Total votes		135,627	100.0
Democratic hold			

=== 1978 ===
1978 United States House of Representatives elections in California
Party	Candidate	Votes	%
Democratic	Lionel Van Deerlin (Incumbent)	85,126	73.7
Republican	Lawrence C. Mattera	30,319	26.3
Total votes		115,445	100.0
Democratic hold			

=== 1980 ===
1980 United States House of Representatives elections in California
Party	Candidate	Votes	%
Republican	Duncan Hunter	79,713	53.3
Democratic	Lionel Van Deerlin (Incumbent)	69,936	46.7
Total votes		149,649	100.0
Republican gain from Democratic			

=== 1982 ===
1982 United States House of Representatives elections in California
Party	Candidate	Votes	%
Republican	Dan Lungren (Incumbent)	142,845	69.0
Democratic	James P. Spellman	58,690	28.3
Peace and Freedom	John S. Donohue	5,514	2.7
Total votes		207,049	100.0
Republican hold			

=== 1984 ===
1984 United States House of Representatives elections in California
Party	Candidate	Votes	%
Republican	Dan Lungren (Incumbent)	177,783	73.0
Democratic	Mary Lou Brophy	60,025	24.6
Peace and Freedom	John S. Donohue	5,811	2.4
Total votes		243,619	100.0
Republican hold			

=== 1986 ===
1986 United States House of Representatives elections in California
Party	Candidate	Votes	%
Republican	Dan Lungren (Incumbent)	140,364	72.8
Democratic	Michael P. Blackburn	47,586	24.7
Peace and Freedom	Kate McClatchy	4,761	2.5
Total votes		192,711	100.0
Republican hold			

=== 1988 ===
1988 United States House of Representatives elections in California
Party	Candidate	Votes	%
Republican	Dana Rohrabacher	153,280	64.2
Democratic	Guy C. Kimbrough	78,778	33.0
Libertarian	Richard D. Rose	6,563	2.8
Total votes		238,621	100.0
Republican hold			

=== 1990 ===
1990 United States House of Representatives elections in California
Party	Candidate	Votes	%
Republican	Dana Rohrabacher (Incumbent)	109,353	59.3
Democratic	Guy C. Kimbrough	67,189	36.5
Libertarian	Richard Gibb Martin	7,744	4.2
Total votes		184,286	100.0
Republican hold			

=== 1992 ===
1992 United States House of Representatives elections in California
Party	Candidate	Votes	%
Democratic	George Brown, Jr. (Incumbent)	79,780	50.7
Republican	Dick Rutan	69,251	44.0
Libertarian	Fritz R. Ward	8,424	5.3
Total votes		157,455	100.0
Democratic hold			

=== 1994 ===
1994 United States House of Representatives elections in California
Party	Candidate	Votes	%
Democratic	George Brown, Jr. (Incumbent)	58,888	51.1
Republican	Rob Guzman	56,259	48.9
Independent	LaBine (write-in)	44	0.0
Independent	Sanchez (write-in)	14	0.0
Total votes		115,205	100.0
Democratic hold			

=== 1996 ===
1996 United States House of Representatives elections in California
Party	Candidate	Votes	%
Democratic	George Brown, Jr. (Incumbent)	52,166	50.5
Republican	Linda Wilde	51,170	49.5
Total votes		103,336	100.0
Democratic hold			

=== 1998 ===
1998 United States House of Representatives elections in California
Party	Candidate	Votes	%
Democratic	George Brown, Jr. (Incumbent)	62,207	55.3
Republican	Elia Pirozzi	45,328	40.3
American Independent	Hale McGee	3,086	2.7
Libertarian	David Lynn Hollist	1,899	1.7
Total votes		112,520	100.0
Democratic hold			

=== 1999 (special) ===
1999 California's 42nd congressional district special election
Party	Candidate	Votes	%
Democratic	Joe Baca	23,690	50.55%
Republican	Elia Pirozzi	21,018	44.85%
Reform	Rick Simon	1,198	2.56%
Libertarian	Scott Ballard	956	2.04%
Total votes		46,862	100.00%
Democratic hold			

=== 2000 ===
2000 United States House of Representatives elections in California
Party	Candidate	Votes	%
Democratic	Joe Baca (Incumbent)	90,585	59.8
Republican	Eli Pirozzi	53,239	35.2
Libertarian	John "Scott" Ballard	4,059	2.6
Natural Law	Gwyn Hartley	3,694	2.4
Total votes		151,577	100.0
Democratic hold			

=== 2002 ===
2002 United States House of Representatives elections in California
Party	Candidate	Votes	%
Republican	Gary Miller (Incumbent)	98,476	67.8
Democratic	Richard Waldron	42,090	29.0
Libertarian	Donald Yee	4,680	3.2
Total votes		145,186	100.0
Republican hold			

=== 2004 ===
2004 United States House of Representatives elections in California
Party	Candidate	Votes	%
Republican	Gary Miller (Incumbent)	167,632	68.2
Democratic	Lewis Myers	78,393	31.8
Total votes		246,025	100.0
Republican hold			

=== 2006 ===
2006 United States House of Representatives elections in California
Party	Candidate	Votes	%
Republican	Gary Miller (Incumbent)	129,720	100.0
Republican hold			

=== 2008 ===
2008 United States House of Representatives elections in California
Party	Candidate	Votes	%
Republican	Gary Miller (Incumbent)	158,404	60.2
Democratic	Ed Chau	104,909	39.8
Total votes		263,313	100.0
Republican hold			

=== 2010 ===
2010 United States House of Representatives elections in California
Party	Candidate	Votes	%
Republican	Gary Miller (Incumbent)	127,161	62.3
Democratic	Michael Williamson	65,122	31.8
Libertarian	Mark Lambert	12,115	5.9
Total votes		204,398	100.0
Republican hold			

=== 2012 ===
2012 United States House of Representatives elections in California
Party	Candidate	Votes	%
Republican	Ken Calvert (Incumbent)	130,245	60.6
Democratic	Michael Williamson	84,702	39.4
Total votes		214,947	100.0
Republican hold			

=== 2014 ===
2014 United States House of Representatives elections in California
Party	Candidate	Votes	%
Republican	Ken Calvert (Incumbent)	74,540	65.7
Democratic	Tim Sheridan	38,850	34.3
Total votes		113,390	100.0
Republican hold			

=== 2016 ===
2016 United States House of Representatives elections in California
Party	Candidate	Votes	%
Republican	Ken Calvert (Incumbent)	149,547	58.8
Democratic	Tim Sheridan	104,689	41.2
Total votes		254,236	100.0
Republican hold			

=== 2018 ===
2018 United States House of Representatives elections in California
Party	Candidate	Votes	%
Republican	Ken Calvert (Incumbent)	131,040	56.5
Democratic	Julia C. Peacock	100,892	43.5
Total votes		231,932	100.0
Republican hold			

=== 2020 ===
2020 United States House of Representatives elections in California
Party	Candidate	Votes	%
Republican	Ken Calvert (Incumbent)	210,274	57.1
Democratic	William "Liam" O'Mara	157,773	42.9
Total votes		368,047	100.0
Republican hold			

=== 2022 ===
2022 United States House of Representatives elections in California
Party	Candidate	Votes	%
Democratic	Robert Garcia	99,217	68.4
Republican	John Briscoe	45,903	31.6
Total votes		145,120	100.0
Democratic hold			

=== 2024 ===
California's 42nd congressional district, 2024
Primary election
Party	Candidate	Votes	%
Democratic	Robert Garcia (incumbent)	49,891	52.1
Republican	John Briscoe	30,599	31.9
Democratic	Nicole López	8,758	9.1
Democratic	Joaquin Beltran	6,532	6.8
Total votes		95,780	100.0
General election
Democratic	Robert Garcia (incumbent)	159,153	68.1
Republican	John Briscoe	74,410	31.9
Total votes		233,563	100.0
Democratic hold			

== Historical district boundaries ==
From 2003 to 2013, the district covered parts of Los Angeles, Orange, and San Bernardino counties in Southern California.

== See also ==
- List of United States congressional districts
- California's congressional districts
