= California's 44th congressional district =

U.S. House district for California

Coordinates: 33.85°N 118.25°W

- Interactive map of district boundaries
- Representative: Nanette Barragán; D–Los Angeles
- Area: 105.2 mi^{2} (272 km^{2})
- Distribution: 100% urban; 0% rural
- Population (2025): 733,168
- Median household income: $89,628
- Ethnicity: 61.1% Hispanic; 12.5% White; 11.4% Asian; 10.8% Black; 2.6% Two or more races; 0.9% Pacific Islander Americans; 0.7% other
- Cook PVI: D+19

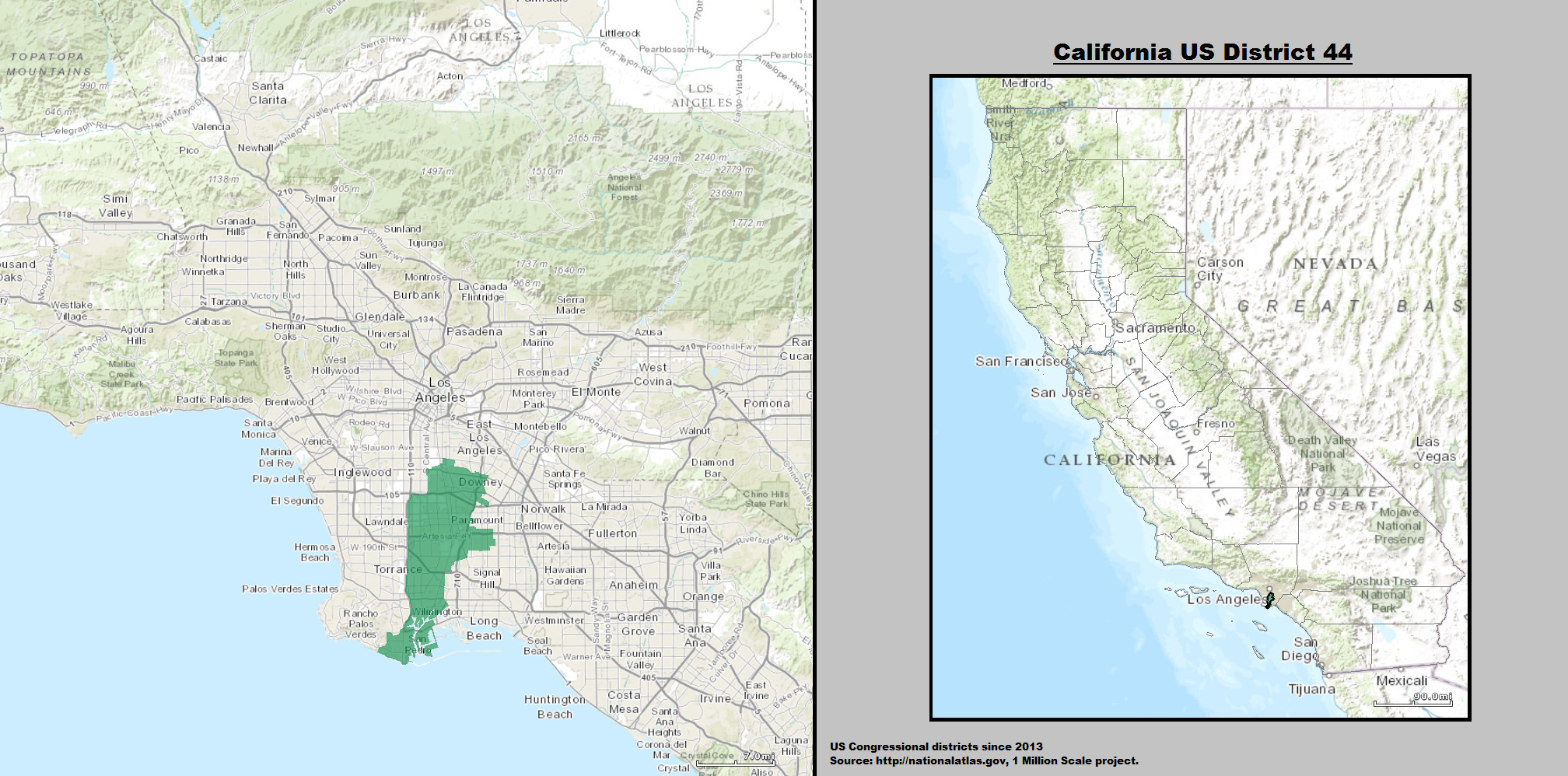
California's 44th congressional district until 2023

California's 44th congressional district is a congressional district in the U.S. state of California. The district is centered in South Los Angeles and the Los Angeles Harbor Region. It is currently represented by Democrat Nanette Barragán. The 44th district was created as a result of the redistricting cycle after the 1980 census.

The 44th district is composed of these cities and communities: Carson, Compton, East Compton, East Rancho Dominguez, Lakewood, Lynwood, North Long Beach, San Pedro, South Gate, Watts, Walnut Park, West Rancho Dominguez, Willowbrook, and Wilmington.

The congressional district is located in the southern portion of the state and includes part of Los Angeles County. The district's current borders are delineated by the 110 freeway in its western border and takes an inward right following the 105 Freeway. Following S. Central Avenue north, it then zig-zags its way to Florence Ave at its apex. Its eastern border runs mostly along the 710 Freeway until reaching the Pacific Ocean.

== Education ==
The following school districts serve the area: Los Angeles Unified School District, Compton Unified School District, Lynwood Unified School District, Long Beach Unified School District, and Paramount Unified School District.

California State University Dominguez Hills, Compton Community College, Charles R Drew University of Medicine and Science, and Los Angeles Harbor College are the only institutions of higher education in the district.

The high school graduation rate is 63.9% and bachelor's degree or higher 13.4%

== Recent election results from statewide races ==
=== 2023–2027 boundaries ===
Year	Office	Results
2008	President	Obama 74% - 26%
2010	Governor	Brown 68% - 26%
2010	Lt. Governor	Newsom 61% - 27%
2010	Secretary of State	Bowen 67% - 24%
2010	Attorney General	Harris 59% - 32%
2010	Treasurer	Lockyer 70% - 23%
2010	Controller	Chiang 67% - 23%
2012	President	Obama 77% - 23%
2014	Governor	Brown 71% - 29%
2016	President	Clinton 76% - 19%
2018	Governor	Newsom 74% - 26%
2018	Attorney General	Becerra 77% - 23%
2020	President	Biden 73% - 25%
2022	Senate (Reg.)	Padilla 72% - 28%
2022	Governor	Newsom 69% - 31%
2022	Lt. Governor	Kounalakis 69% - 31%
2022	Secretary of State	Weber 70% - 30%
2022	Attorney General	Bonta 70% - 30%
2022	Treasurer	Ma 69% - 31%
2022	Controller	Cohen 67% - 33%
2024	President	Harris 65% - 32%
2024	Senate (Reg.)	Schiff 66% - 34%

=== 2027–2033 boundaries ===
Year	Office	Results
2008	President	Obama 74% - 26%
2010	Governor	Brown 68% - 26%
2010	Lt. Governor	Newsom 61% - 27%
2010	Secretary of State	Bowen 67% - 24%
2010	Attorney General	Harris 59% - 32%
2010	Treasurer	Lockyer 70% - 23%
2010	Controller	Chiang 67% - 23%
2012	President	Obama 77% - 23%
2014	Governor	Brown 71% - 29%
2016	President	Clinton 76% - 19%
2018	Governor	Newsom 74% - 26%
2018	Attorney General	Becerra 77% - 23%
2020	President	Biden 73% - 25%
2022	Senate (Reg.)	Padilla 72% - 28%
2022	Governor	Newsom 69% - 31%
2022	Lt. Governor	Kounalakis 69% - 31%
2022	Secretary of State	Weber 70% - 30%
2022	Attorney General	Bonta 70% - 30%
2022	Treasurer	Ma 69% - 31%
2022	Controller	Cohen 67% - 33%
2024	President	Harris 65% - 32%
2024	Senate (Reg.)	Schiff 66% - 34%

== Composition ==
FIPS County Code	County	Seat	Population
37	Los Angeles	Los Angeles	9,663,345

Under the 2020 redistricting, California's 44th congressional district is located in the South Bay region of Los Angeles County. It includes the cities of Carson, Paramount, South Gate, Lynwood, west side Lakewood; the North Long Beach neighborhood of Long Beach; the Los Angeles neighborhoods of San Pedro and Wilmington; and the census-designated place West Carson.

Southern Los Angeles County is split between this district, the 36th district, the 43rd district, and the 42nd district. The 44th and 36th are partitioned by Sepulveda Blvd, Normandie Ave, Frampton Ave, 253rd St, 255th St, Belle Porte Ave, 256th St, 1720 256th St-1733 256th St, 1701 257th St-1733 257th St, 1734 257th St-W 262nd St, Ozone Ave, 263rd St, 26302 Alta Vista Ave-26356 Alta Vista Ave, Pineknoll Ave, Leesdale Ave, Highway 213, Palos Verde Dr N, 26613 Leesdale Ave-Navy Field, S Western Ave, Westmont Dr, Eastview Park, Mt Rose Rd/Amelia Ave, 1102 W Bloomwood Rd-1514 Caddington Dr, N Western Ave, W Summerland St, N Enrose Ave/Miraleste Dr, Miraleste Dr, Martin J. Bogdanovich Recreation Center and Park, and Shoreline Park.

The 44th and 42nd are partitioned by S Alameda St, Southern Pacific Railroad, Ardmore Ave, Long Beach Blvd, Pacific Blvd, Cudahy St, 2622 Cudahy St-3211 Santa Ana St, Santa Ana St, Salt Lake Ave, Patata St, 7038 Dinwiddie St-10112 Karmont Ave, Imperial Highway, Old River School Rd, Union Pacific Railroad, Gardendale St, Century Blvd, Highway 19. Laurel St, Clark Ave, Beach St, Bellflower Blvd, E Carson St, Woodruff Ave, Gonda Ave, E Wardlow Rd, N Los Coyotes Diagonal, McNab Ave, E Spring St, E Harvey Way, Faculty Ave, E Carson St, Norse Way, Lakewood Golf Course, Cover St, E 36th St, Cherry Ave, Atlantic Ave, E Willow St, Long Beach Blvd, Highway 1, Oregon Ave, W Anaheim St, Los Angeles River, Canal Ave, W 19th St, Santa Fe Ave, Seabright Ave, W 25th St, W Willow St, Middle Rd-East Rd, 2300 E Pacific Coast Highway-W Anaheim St, E Anaheim St-Cerritos Channel, Piers S Ave, Highway 47, and Navy Mole Rd.

The 44th and 43rd are partitioned by Alameda St, E 103rd St, Mona Blvd, E 107th Pl, E 108th St, S Alameda St, Highway 105, Mona Blvd, Santa Fe Ave, E Stockton Ave, N Bullis Rd, Palm Ave/E Killen Pl, N Thorson Ave, McMillan St, Waldorf Dr/N Castlegate Ave, S Gibson Ave, Wright Rd, E Rosecrans Ave, Highway 710, Somerset Blvd, Myrrh St, Hunsake Ave, Alondra Blvd, E Greenleaf Blvd, Main Campus Dr, S Susana Rd, Highway 91, Highway 47, Calle Anita, 2605 Homestead Pl-266 W Apras St, 255 W Victoria St-18300 S Wilmington Ave, W Victoria St, Central Ave, Lincoln Memorial Park, 2600 W Billings St-2973 W Caldwell St, Malloy Ave/S Clymar Ave, W Alondra Blvd, S Figueroa St, W 182nd St, Electric St, and S Western Ave.

=== Cities and CDPs with 10,000 or more people ===
- Los Angeles – 3,820,914
- Long Beach – 466,742
- Carson – 95,558
- South Gate – 92,726
- Lakewood – 82,496
- Bellflower – 79,190
- Lynwood – 67,265
- Paramount – 55,733
- West Carson – 22,870

== List of members representing the district ==
Member	Party	Dates	Cong ress(es)	Electoral history	Counties
District created January 3, 1983
Jim Bates (San Diego)	Democratic	January 3, 1983 – January 3, 1991	98th 99th 100th 101st	Elected in 1982. Re-elected in 1984. Re-elected in 1986. Re-elected in 1988. Lost re-election.	1983–1993; San Diego (San Diego)
Duke Cunningham (Chula Vista)	Republican	January 3, 1991 – January 3, 1993	102nd	Elected in 1990. Redistricted to the 51st district.	1983–1993; San Diego (San Diego)
Al McCandless (La Quinta)	Republican	January 3, 1993 – January 3, 1995	103rd	Redistricted from the 37th district and re-elected in 1992. Retired.	1993–2003; Riverside
Sonny Bono (Palm Springs)	Republican	January 3, 1995 – January 5, 1998	104th 105th	Elected in 1994. Re-elected in 1996. Died.	1993–2003; Riverside
Vacant		January 5, 1998 – April 7, 1998	105th		1993–2003; Riverside
Mary Bono (Palm Springs)	Republican	April 7, 1998 – January 3, 2003	105th 106th 107th	Elected to finish her husband's term. Re-elected in 1998. Re-elected in 2000. Redistricted to the 45th district.	1993–2003; Riverside
Ken Calvert (Corona)	Republican	January 3, 2003 – January 3, 2013	108th 109th 110th 111th 112th	Redistricted from the 43rd district and re-elected in 2002. Re-elected in 2004. Re-elected in 2006. Re-elected in 2008. Re-elected in 2010. Redistricted to the 42nd district.	2003–2013 Orange (San Clemente), Riverside (Corona, Riverside)
Janice Hahn (Los Angeles)	Democratic	January 3, 2013 – December 4, 2016	113th 114th	Redistricted from the 36th district and re-elected in 2012. Re-elected in 2014. Resigned when elected to the Los Angeles County Board of Supervisors.	2013–2023 Los Angeles (Carson, Compton, and San Pedro)
Vacant		December 4, 2016 – January 3, 2017	114th		2013–2023 Los Angeles (Carson, Compton, and San Pedro)
Nanette Barragán (Los Angeles)	Democratic	January 3, 2017 – present	115th 116th 117th 118th 119th	Elected in 2016. Re-elected in 2018. Re-elected in 2020. Re-elected in 2022. Re-elected in 2024. Re-elected in 2026.	2013–2023 Los Angeles (Carson, Compton, and San Pedro)
Nanette Barragán (Los Angeles)	Democratic	January 3, 2017 – present	115th 116th 117th 118th 119th	Elected in 2016. Re-elected in 2018. Re-elected in 2020. Re-elected in 2022. Re-elected in 2024. Re-elected in 2026.	2023–present Los Angeles (Carson, San Pedro, and South Gate)

== Election results ==
=== 1982 ===
1982 United States House of Representatives elections in California
Party	Candidate	Votes	%
Democratic	Jim Bates	78,474	64.9
Republican	Shirley M. Gissendanner	38,447	31.8
Libertarian	Jim Conole	3,904	3.3
Total votes		120,825	100.0
Democratic win (new seat)			

=== 1984 ===
1984 United States House of Representatives elections in California
Party	Candidate	Votes	%
Democratic	Jim Bates (Incumbent)	99,378	69.7
Republican	Neill Campbell	39,977	28.1
Libertarian	Jim Conole	3,206	2.2
Total votes		142,561	100.0
Democratic hold			

=== 1986 ===
1986 United States House of Representatives elections in California
Party	Candidate	Votes	%
Democratic	Jim Bates (Incumbent)	70,557	64.2
Republican	Bill Mitchell	36,359	33.2
Peace and Freedom	Shirley Rachel Issacson	1,676	1.5
Libertarian	Dennis Thompson	1,244	1.1
Total votes		109,836	100.0
Democratic hold			

=== 1988 ===
1988 United States House of Representatives elections in California
Party	Candidate	Votes	%
Democratic	Jim Bates (Incumbent)	90,796	59.7
Republican	Rob Butterfield	55,511	36.5
Libertarian	Dennis Thompson	5,782	3.8
Total votes		152,089	100.0
Democratic hold			

=== 1990 ===
1990 United States House of Representatives elections in California
Party	Candidate	Votes	%
Republican	Duke Cunningham	50,377	46.3
Democratic	Jim Bates (Incumbent)	48,712	44.8
Peace and Freedom	Donna White	5,237	4.9
Libertarian	John Wallner	4,385	4.0
Total votes		108,711	100.0
Republican gain from Democratic			

=== 1992 ===
1992 United States House of Representatives elections in California
Party	Candidate	Votes	%
Republican	Al McCandless (Incumbent)	110,333	54.2
Democratic	Georgia Smith	81,693	40.1
Libertarian	Phil Turner	11,515	5.7
Total votes		203,541	100.0
Republican hold			

=== 1994 ===
1994 United States House of Representatives elections in California
Party	Candidate	Votes	%
Republican	Sonny Bono	95,521	55.6
Democratic	Steve Clute	65,370	38.1
American Independent	Donald Cochran	10,885	6.3
Total votes		171,776	100.0
Republican hold			

=== 1996 ===
1996 United States House of Representatives elections in California
Party	Candidate	Votes	%
Republican	Sonny Bono (Incumbent)	110,643	57.8
Democratic	Anita Rufus	73,844	38.6
American Independent	Donald Cochran	3,888	2.0
Natural Law	Karen Wilkinson	3,143	1.6
Republican	Colleen Cummings (write-in)	110	0.0
Total votes		191,628	100.0
Republican hold			

=== 1998 (Special) ===
1998 California's 44th congressional district special election
Party	Candidate	Votes	%
Republican	Mary Bono	53,755	64.0
Democratic	Ralph Waite	24,228	28.8
Democratic	Anna Nevenich	2,415	2.9
Democratic	John W. J. Overman	1,435	1.7
Republican	Tom Hamey	1,235	1.5
Republican	Bud Mathewson	946	1.1
Total votes		84,014	100.0
Turnout			31.1
Republican hold			

=== 1998 ===
1998 United States House of Representatives elections in California
Party	Candidate	Votes	%
Republican	Mary Bono (Incumbent)	97,013	60.1
Democratic	Ralph Waite	57,697	35.7
Natural Law	Jim J. Meuer	6,818	4.2
Total votes		161,528	100.0
Republican hold			

=== 2000 ===
2000 United States House of Representatives elections in California
Party	Candidate	Votes	%
Republican	Mary Bono (Incumbent)	123,738	59.2
Democratic	Ron Oden	79,302	38.0
Reform	Gene Smith	4,135	1.9
Natural Law	Jim Meuer	2,012	0.9
Total votes		209,187	100.0
Republican hold			

=== 2002 ===
2002 United States House of Representatives elections in California
Party	Candidate	Votes	%
Republican	Ken Calvert (Incumbent)	76,686	63.7
Democratic	Louis Vandenberg	38,021	31.6
Green	Phill Courtney	5,756	4.7
Total votes		120,463	100.0
Republican hold			

=== 2004 ===
2004 United States House of Representatives elections in California
Party	Candidate	Votes	%
Republican	Ken Calvert (Incumbent)	138,768	61.7
Democratic	Louis Vandenberg	78,796	35.0
Peace and Freedom	Kevin Akin	7,559	3.3
Total votes		225,123	100.0
Republican hold			

=== 2006 ===
2006 United States House of Representatives elections in California
Party	Candidate	Votes	%
Republican	Ken Calvert (Incumbent)	89,555	60.0
Democratic	Louis Vandenberg	55,275	37.0
Peace and Freedom	Kevin Akin	4,486	3.0
Total votes		149,316	100.0
Republican hold			

=== 2008 ===
2008 United States House of Representatives elections in California
Party	Candidate	Votes	%
Republican	Ken Calvert (Incumbent)	129,937	51.2
Democratic	Bill Hedrick	123,890	48.8
Total votes		253,827	100.0
Republican hold			

=== 2010 ===
2010 United States House of Representatives elections in California
Party	Candidate	Votes	%
Republican	Ken Calvert (Incumbent)	107,482	55.7
Democratic	Bill Hedrick	85,784	44.3
Total votes		193,266	100.0
Republican hold			

=== 2012 ===
2012 United States House of Representatives elections in California
Party	Candidate	Votes	%
Democratic	Janice Hahn (Incumbent)	99,909	60.2
Democratic	Laura Richardson (Incumbent)	65,989	39.8
Total votes		165,898	100.0
Democratic hold			

=== 2014 ===
2014 United States House of Representatives elections in California
Party	Candidate	Votes	%
Democratic	Janice Hahn (Incumbent)	59,670	86.7
Peace and Freedom	Adam Shbeita	9,192	13.3
Total votes		68,862	100.0
Democratic hold			

=== 2016 ===
2016 United States House of Representatives elections in California
Party	Candidate	Votes	%
Democratic	Nanette Barragán	93,124	52.2
Democratic	Isadore Hall	85,289	47.8
Total votes		178,413	100.0
Democratic hold			

=== 2018 ===
2018 United States House of Representatives elections in California
Party	Candidate	Votes	%
Democratic	Nanette Barragán (Incumbent)	97,944	68.3
Democratic	Aja Brown (withdrew)	45,378	31.7
Total votes		143,322	100.0
Democratic hold			

=== 2020 ===
2020 United States House of Representatives elections in California
Party	Candidate	Votes	%
Democratic	Nanette Barragán (incumbent)	139,661	67.8
Democratic	Analilia Joya	66,375	32.2
Total votes		206,036	100.0
Democratic hold			

=== 2022 ===
2022 United States House of Representatives elections in California
Party	Candidate	Votes	%
Democratic	Nanette Barragán (incumbent)	100,160	72.2
Republican	Paul Jones	38,554	27.8
Total votes		138,714	100.0
Democratic hold			

=== 2024 ===
2024 United States House of Representatives elections in California
Party	Candidate	Votes	%
Democratic	Nanette Barragán (incumbent)	164,765	71.4
Republican	Roger Groh	66,087	28.6
Total votes		230,852	100.0
Democratic hold			

== Historical district boundaries ==
What was once the 44th congressional district is now California's 50th congressional district.

In the 1980s, the 44th district was one of four that divided San Diego. It covered some of the northern and eastern parts of San Diego County. The district had been held for eight years by Democrat Jim Bates and was considered the most Democratic district in the San Diego area. However, Bates was bogged down in a scandal involving charges of sexual harassment. Randy "Duke" Cunningham won the Republican nomination and hammered Bates about the scandal. He won by just a point, meaning that the San Diego area was represented entirely by Republicans for only the second time since the city was split into three districts after the 1960 United States census.

In the 1990 U.S. census, the district was renumbered the 51st congressional district, and much of its share of San Diego was moved to the new 50th congressional district.

=== 2003-13 ===
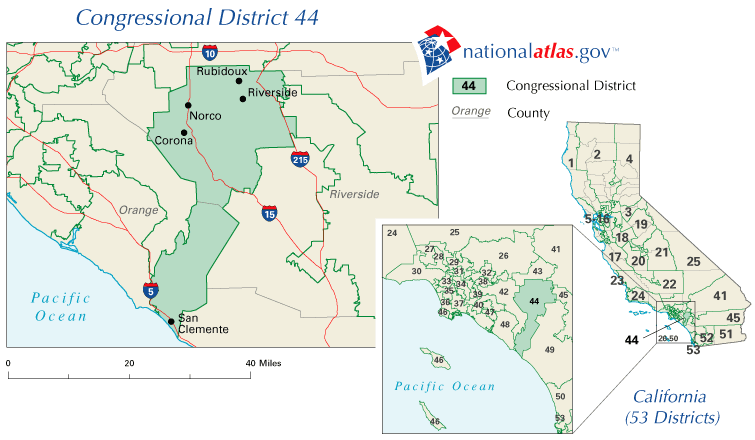
Between 2003 and 2013, the 44th district covered an area of Southern California from San Clemente in Orange County on the coast, north-by-northeast inland to Riverside County, including the cities of Corona, Norco, Rubidoux, and Riverside.

=== 2013-23 ===
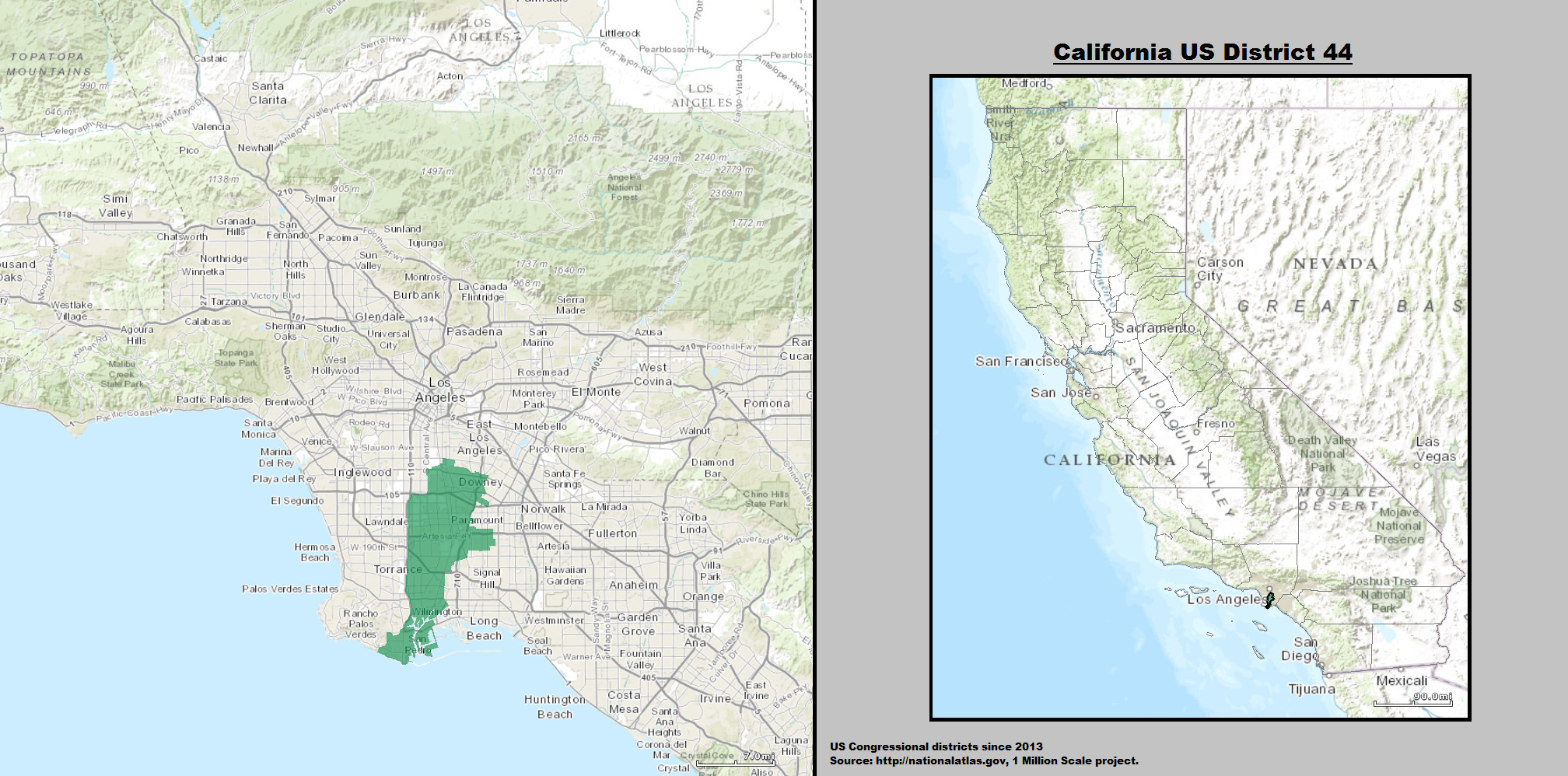

== See also ==
- List of United States congressional districts
- California's congressional districts
