= Al McCandless =

American politician (1927–2017)

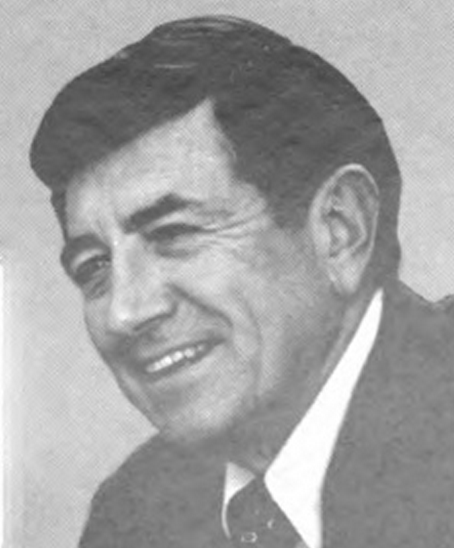

Member of the U.S. House of Representatives from California
- In office January 3, 1983 – January 3, 1995
- Preceded by: Jerry Lewis (redistricting)
- Succeeded by: Sonny Bono
- Constituency: 37th district (1983–93); 44th district (1993–95)

Personal details
- Born: July 23, 1927 Brawley, California, U.S.
- Died: August 9, 2017 (aged 90) La Quinta, California, U.S.
- Party: Republican
- Education: University of California at Los Angeles
- Profession: automotive dealer

Military service
- Allegiance: United States
- Branch/service: United States Marine Corps
- Years of service: 1945–46; 1950–52
- Rank: Captain

Alfred A. McCandless (July 23, 1927 – August 9, 2017) was an American businessman, military veteran, and politician who served six terms as a Republican politician from California from 1983 to 1995.

== Biography ==
McCandless was born in Brawley, Imperial County, California, on July 23, 1927. He attended Los Angeles City schools and received a B.A., University of California at Los Angeles in 1951.

=== Military ===
McCandless served in the United States Marine Corps from 1945 to 1946 and from 1950 to 1952, and attained the rank of captain.

=== Early career ===
He later worked as an automobile and truck dealer from 1953 to 1975, and was a member of the Riverside County board of supervisors from 1972 to 1982 and the Riverside County housing authority from 1974 to 1982.

=== Congress ===
McCandless was elected as a Republican to the 98th and to the five succeeding Congresses (January 3, 1983 to January 3, 1995) and was not a candidate for reelection to the 114th Congress.

=== Death ===
McCandless died at his home in La Quinta, California, on August 9, 2017, at the age of 90.

== Electoral results ==
1982 United States House of Representatives elections in California
| Party | Candidate | Votes | % |
|---|---|---|---|
| Republican | Al McCandless | 105,065 | 59.1 |
| Democratic | Curtis R. "Sam" Cross | 68,510 | 38.5 |
| Libertarian | Marc R. Wruble | 4,297 | 2.4 |
| Total votes | | 177,872 | 100.0 |
| Republican hold | | | |

1984 United States House of Representatives elections in California
| Party | Candidate | Votes | % |
|---|---|---|---|
| Republican | Al McCandless (Incumbent) | 149,955 | 63.6 |
| Democratic | David E. "Dave" Skinner | 85,908 | 36.4 |
| Total votes | | 245,863 | 100.0 |
| Republican hold | | | |

1986 United States House of Representatives elections in California
| Party | Candidate | Votes | % |
|---|---|---|---|
| Republican | Al McCandless (Incumbent) | 122,416 | 63.7 |
| Democratic | David E. "Dave" Skinner | 69,808 | 36.3 |
| Total votes | | 192,224 | 100.0 |
| Republican hold | | | |

1988 United States House of Representatives elections in California
| Party | Candidate | Votes | % |
|---|---|---|---|
| Republican | Al McCandless (Incumbent) | 174,284 | 64.3 |
| Democratic | Johnny Pearson | 89,666 | 33.1 |
| Libertarian | Bonnie Flickinger | 7,169 | 2.6 |
| Independent | Write-ins | 123 | 0.0 |
| Total votes | | 271,242 | 100.0 |
| Republican hold | | | |

1990 United States House of Representatives elections in California
| Party | Candidate | Votes | % |
|---|---|---|---|
| Republican | Al McCandless (Incumbent) | 115,469 | 49.7 |
| Democratic | Ralph Waite | 103,961 | 44.8 |
| American Independent | Gary R. Odom | 6,474 | 2.8 |
| Libertarian | Bonnie Flickinger | 6,178 | 2.7 |
| Total votes | | 232,082 | 100.0 |
| Republican hold | | | |

1992 United States House of Representatives elections in California
| Party | Candidate | Votes | % |
|---|---|---|---|
| Republican | Al McCandless (Incumbent) | 110,333 | 54.2 |
| Democratic | Georgia Smith | 81,693 | 40.1 |
| Libertarian | Phil Turner | 11,515 | 5.7 |
| Total votes | | 203,541 | 100.0 |
| Republican hold | | | |

U.S. House of Representatives
| Preceded by Jerry Lewis | United States Representative for the 37th congressional district of California; 1983–1993 | Succeeded by Walter R. Tucker III |
| Preceded by Randy "Duke" Cunningham | United States Representative for the 44th congressional district of California; 1993–1995 | Succeeded by Sonny Bono |
