= Esteban Torres =

American politician (1930–2022)

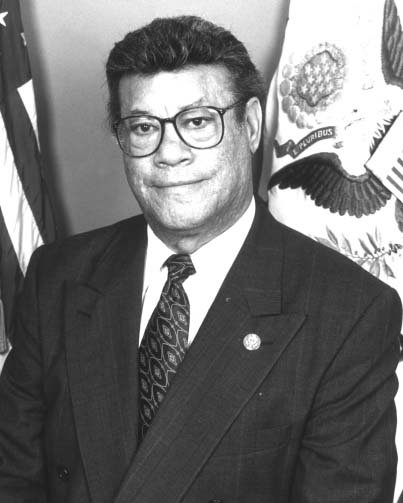

Member of the U.S. House of Representatives from California's 34th district
- In office January 3, 1983 – January 3, 1999
- Preceded by: Dan Lungren
- Succeeded by: Grace Napolitano

Personal details
- Born: Esteban Edward Torres; January 27, 1930 Miami, Arizona, U.S.
- Died: January 25, 2022 (aged 91)
- Party: Democratic
- Spouse: Arcy Sanchez
- Children: 4
- Education: East Los Angeles College (attended); California State University, Los Angeles (BA); University of Maryland, College Park (attended); American University (attended)

Military service
- Branch/service: United States Army
- Years of service: 1949–1953
- Rank: Sergeant First Class
- Battles/wars: Korean War

Esteban Edward Torres (January 27, 1930 – January 25, 2022) was an American politician who served as member of the United States House of Representatives for California's 34th congressional district from 1983 to 1999.

== Early life and education ==
Torres was born in Miami, Arizona, to parents from Mexico. He was raised in East Los Angeles, California mostly by his mother, Rena Gómez. His father was a miner, but was deported to Mexico during the Mexican Repatriation of the 1930s. He graduated from East Los Angeles College and California State University, Los Angeles, and later took graduate courses at the University of Maryland, College Park, and American University.

== Career ==
He served in the United States Army from 1949 to 1953. Torres came up through the United Auto Workers, ultimately serving as the international representative of UAW 1964-68 in Washington, DC. In addition to being active in the labor movement, he was appointed United States Ambassador to the United Nations Educational, Scientific and Cultural Organization (UNESCO), Paris, France, from 1977 to 1979 and served as a special assistant to President Jimmy Carter from 1979 to 1981.

=== Congress ===
Torres was unsuccessful in his attempt to win a seat in the House of Representatives in 1974, but was elected in 1982 as a Democrat. He served from 1983 until 1999. During his time in office, he prioritized issue related to Hispanics, and in 1986 he played a key role in the development and passage of the Immigration Reform and Control Act.

He did not run for reelection in 1998 and was succeeded by Democrat Grace Napolitano.

=== Later life ===
He served as a member of the California Transportation Commission from 1997 to 2007.

== Personal life and death ==
Torres and his wife, Arcy Sanchez, had four children. He died on January 25, 2022, two days shy of his 92nd birthday.

== Legacy and awards ==
- Esteban E. Torres NCLR-Harvard Mid-Career Fellowship Program - a partnership between NCLR and the John F. Kennedy School of Government
- Esteban Torres High School
- In 2001, Torres was awarded an honorary Doctor of Humane Letters (L.H.D.) degree from Whittier College.

== Electoral history ==
Esteban Torres electoral history

1982 United States House of Representatives elections in California
Party	Candidate	Votes	%
Democratic	Esteban Torres	68,316	57.2
Republican	Paul R. Jackson	51,026	42.8
Total votes		119,342	100.0
Democratic hold			

1984 United States House of Representatives elections in California
Party	Candidate	Votes	%
Democratic	Esteban Torres (Incumbent)	87,060	59.8
Republican	Paul R. Jackson	58,467	40.2
Total votes		145,527	100.0
Democratic hold			

1986 United States House of Representatives elections in California
Party	Candidate	Votes	%
Democratic	Esteban Torres (Incumbent)	66,404	60.3
Republican	Charles M. House	43,659	39.7
Total votes		110,063	100.0
Democratic hold			

1988 United States House of Representatives elections in California
Party	Candidate	Votes	%
Democratic	Esteban Torres (Incumbent)	92,087	63.2
Republican	Charles M. House	50,954	35.0
Libertarian	Carl M. "Marty" Swinney	2,686	1.8
Total votes		145,727	100.0
Democratic hold			

1990 United States House of Representatives elections in California
Party	Candidate	Votes	%
Democratic	Esteban Torres (Incumbent)	55,646	60.7
Republican	John C. Eastman	36,024	39.3
Total votes		91,670	100.0
Democratic hold			

1992 United States House of Representatives elections in California
Party	Candidate	Votes	%
Democratic	Esteban Torres (Incumbent)	91,738	61.3
Republican	J. Jay Hernandez	50,907	34.0
Libertarian	Carl M. "Marty" Swinney	7,072	4.7
Independent	M V Paul Worland (write-in)	1	0.0
Total votes		149,718	100.0
Democratic hold			

1994 United States House of Representatives elections in California
Party	Candidate	Votes	%
Democratic	Esteban Torres (Incumbent)	72,439	61.7
Republican	Albert J. Nunez	40,068	34.1
Libertarian	Carl M. "Marty" Swinney	4,921	4.2
American Independent	J. Scott (write-in)	27	0.0
Total votes		117,455	100.0
Democratic hold			

1996 United States House of Representatives elections in California
Party	Candidate	Votes	%
Democratic	Esteban Torres (Incumbent)	94,730	68.5
Republican	David Nunez	36,852	26.7
American Independent	J. Scott	4,122	2.9
Libertarian	David Argall	2,736	1.9
Total votes		138,440	100.0
Democratic hold			

== See also ==
- List of Hispanic and Latino Americans in the United States Congress

U.S. House of Representatives
Preceded by Dan Lungren	Member of the U.S. House of Representatives from California's 34th congressional district 1983–1999	Succeeded by Grace Napolitano
Preceded by Matthew G. Martínez	Chair of the Congressional Hispanic Caucus; 1986–1987	Succeeded by Albert Bustamante
