= Duncan L. Hunter =

American politician (born 1948)

Duncan Hunter
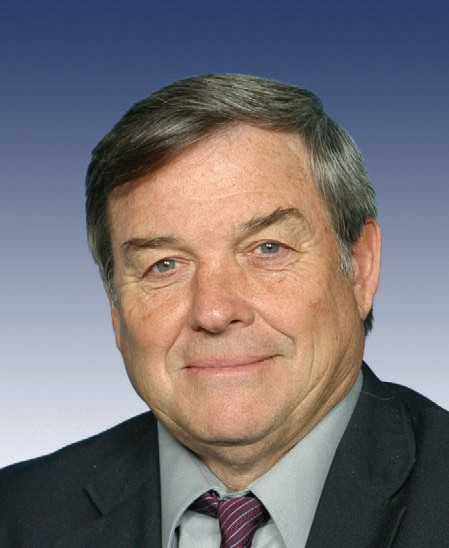

Ranking Member of the House Armed Services Committee
- In office January 3, 2007 – January 3, 2009
- Preceded by: Ike Skelton
- Succeeded by: John McHugh

Chair of the House Armed Services Committee
- In office January 3, 2003 – January 3, 2007
- Preceded by: Bob Stump
- Succeeded by: Ike Skelton

Chair of the House Republican Research Committee
- In office January 3, 1989 – January 3, 1995
- Leader: Bob Michel
- Preceded by: Mickey Edwards
- Succeeded by: Position abolished

Member of the U.S. House of Representatives from California
- In office January 3, 1981 – January 3, 2009
- Preceded by: Lionel Van Deerlin
- Succeeded by: Duncan D. Hunter
- Constituency: 42nd district (1981–1983); 45th district (1983–1993); 52nd district (1993–2009)

Personal details
- Born: Duncan Lee Hunter; May 31, 1948 (age 78) Riverside, California, U.S.
- Party: Republican
- Spouse: Lynne Hunter
- Children: 2, including Duncan
- Education: University of Montana (attended); University of California, Santa Barbara (attended); Western State University (BS, JD)

Military service
- Branch/service: United States Army
- Years of service: 1969–1971
- Rank: First Lieutenant
- Unit: 75th Infantry Regiment (Ranger)
- Battles/wars: Vietnam War
- Awards: Bronze Star Medal; Air Medal; Vietnam Service Medal
- Hunter's voice Hunter on the FY2006 National Defense Authorization Act. Recorded May 25, 2005

Duncan Lee Hunter (born May 31, 1948) is a retired American politician. He was a Republican member of the House of Representatives from California's 52nd, 45th and 42nd districts from 1981 to 2009.

Hunter was the chairman of the House Armed Services Committee during the 108th and 109th Congress. Hunter sought the Republican Party nomination for President of the United States for 2008, but his campaign failed to attract significant voters or delegates in early primary and caucus states, and he dropped out after the Nevada Republican caucuses.

He was succeeded as representative for the 52nd district by his son, Duncan D. Hunter.

== Early life, education, military service, and family ==
Hunter was born in Riverside, California, the son of Lola Lee (née Young) (d. 2004) and Robert Olin Hunter (1915–2006). He graduated from Rubidoux High School in Riverside in 1966. He attended the University of Montana from 1966 to 1967, and then briefly the University of California, Santa Barbara, before being commissioned into the United States Army in 1969.

He served in South Vietnam from 1970 to 1971 during the Vietnam War in the Army Rangers' 75th Infantry Regiment, attached to the 173rd Airborne Brigade. He participated in 24 helicopter assaults as well as in a number of night-time reconnaissance patrols. He held the rank of first lieutenant, and was awarded the Bronze Star, Air Medal, and service ribbons such as the Vietnam Service Medal. He has said, "I didn't do anything special in the U.S. Army, but I served with very special soldiers I will never forget."

Making use of the G.I. Bill in 1973, he enrolled at the San Diego campus of the Western State University College of Law (now Thomas Jefferson School of Law) and earned a Bachelor of Science in Law and Juris Doctor in 1976. Hunter worked farming and construction jobs to supplement his income while finishing his degree. He was admitted to the State Bar of California on December 22, 1976, but has held inactive status since January 1, 1983.

Hunter married Lynne Layh in 1973. Hunter's son, Duncan Duane Hunter (born 1976), a major in the United States Marine Corps Reserve, was deployed to Iraq in 2003 and 2004 and Afghanistan in 2007. On November 4, 2008, Duncan D. Hunter was elected to succeed his father as the congressional representative of the California's 52nd congressional district. On August 21, 2018, Duncan D. Hunter and his wife Margaret, were indicted for criminal activity. In June 2019, federal prosecutors showed that from 2009 to 2016, Hunter had spent campaign funds on extramarital affairs with five women, including lobbyists and congressional staff. In December 2019, Hunter changed his plea to guilty on one count of misusing campaign funds. On March 17, 2020, Hunter was sentenced by the U.S. District Court Southern District of California to 11 months in prison.

Hunter's family attends First Baptist Church of Alpine, which is affiliated with the San Diego Southern Baptist Association. Hunter's Alpine, California home burned down during the October 2003 Cedar Fire. The loss was over $500,000, but insurance covered most of it. Hunter was critical of Governor Gray Davis's response to the fire.

Hunter has another son, Samuel. He has a brother, John Hunter, who has worked as a weapons scientist.

== U.S. House of Representatives ==
=== Initial election and re-elections ===
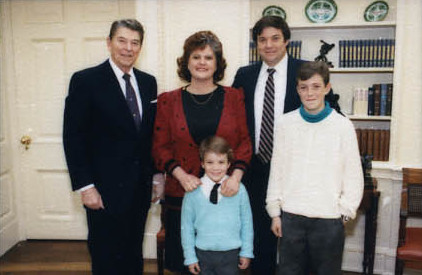
Congressman Hunter and his family with President Ronald Reagan on January 12, 1989

In 1980, Hunter was recruited to run for Congress in what was then the 42nd District against 18-year incumbent Democrat Lionel Van Deerlin. Hunter was initially an underdog in a district where Democrats outnumbered Republicans by almost 2 to 1. However, his attacks on Van Deerlin's record on national defense gained traction in a district dominated by military bases and personnel. Van Deerlin did not respond quickly enough, and Hunter narrowly defeated him. He was one of many Republicans swept into office from historically Democratic districts as a result of the "Reagan revolution"; Van Deerlin had been the district's only congressman since its creation in 1963.

After the 1980 census, many of the more Democratic areas were cut out of Hunter's district, and he was reelected 13 more times with no substantive opposition. During this time, he only won less than 60 percent of the vote once, when he was held to 53.8 percent in 1992. His district was renumbered as the 45th District in 1983 and the 52nd in 1993.

In the 2006 general election, he defeated Navy veteran/minister John Rinaldi, a Democrat, and Michael Benoit, a Libertarian. Hunter was re-elected with 65 percent of the vote, a 33-point margin over Rinaldi.

On March 20, 2007, Hunter announced that, as part of his presidential bid, he would not seek a 15th term in the House of Representatives in 2008. After his son, Duncan D. Hunter, announced his candidacy for his father's seat, the younger Hunter was recalled by the United States Marine Corps to serve in the Operation Enduring Freedom – Afghanistan. During Duncan D. Hunter's active service, his wife, Margaret Hunter, campaigned on his behalf. On June 3, 2008, Duncan D. Hunter won 72% of the Republican Primary vote and became the Republican nominee to replace his father representing the 52nd District.

=== House Armed Services Committee ===
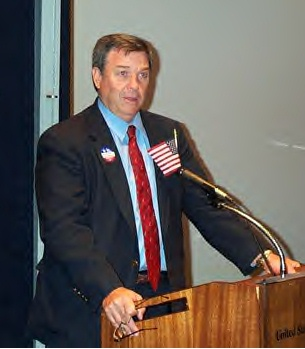
Hunter speaking at the National Maritime Day Events on May 22, 2002

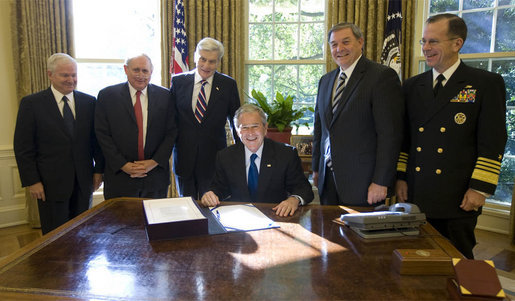
Hunter watches as President George W. Bush signs the Duncan Hunter National Defense Authorization Act for Fiscal Year 2009 on October 14, 2008

Hunter became chairman of the House Armed Services Committee in 2002. As such, he sponsored legislation authorizing defense department fiscal year activities from FY2004 to FY2007. During consideration of the FY2006 Defense Authorization Act, Hunter offered an amendment to the bill clarifying enacted policy restricting women from direct combat units. Hunter's amendment codified existing Army policy enacted in 1994 under former Defense Secretary Les Aspin that prohibited women from submitting or migrating into combat units or operations. The amendment was subsequently withdrawn in order for a study to be conducted on the rationale and future implementation of the policy.

In November 2004, Hunter and Wisconsin Congressman Jim Sensenbrenner withheld their support for a bill creating a Director of National Intelligence (DNI) until specific conditions were met. Hunter argued that the military is the biggest consumer of intelligence and any reforms enacted, including the creation of a DNI, must not endanger the lives of troops on the battlefield. The Intelligence Reform and Terrorism Prevention Act, which created the DNI position, was passed by Congress and signed by President George W. Bush later that year.

In a House Armed Services Committee hearing on November 9, 2005, Hunter strongly criticized a Defense Logistics Agency "prime vendor" buying program that led to the purchase of $20 ice cube trays and a tiny refrigerator for $22,797 (initially exposed by The State). Hunter stated that he wanted explanations from the companies in question and the government purchasing agents who had approved the purchases, accusing the latter of "absolute incompetence." He further stated that the purchases are "a real slap in the face to the guy making $13,000 a year who is engaged in a firefight in Ramadi," and claimed that "A fairly large amount of incompetence is embedded into the system."

On November 18, 2005, in response to Pennsylvania Congressman John Murtha's resolution to terminate the deployment of United States forces in Iraq, to redeploy the forces already involved in Iraq, and to "pursue security and stability in Iraq through diplomacy", Hunter and other Republicans drafted a two-sentence counter-resolution that read:

Expressing the sense of the House of Representatives that the deployment of United States forces in Iraq be terminated immediately.

Resolved, That it is the sense of the House of Representatives that the deployment of United States forces in Iraq be terminated immediately.

Democrats condemned the bill as a political stunt; they made much of the fact that Hunter himself didn't support his own resolution. The bill was defeated, 3–403, in the House of Representatives.

Hunter became ranking member of the committee when Democrats took control of the House in 2007.

On January 31, 2007, Hunter held a press conference on the 2007 Chinese anti-satellite missile test, stating that it "represents the commencement of a new era of military competition in space." He contended that the United States' ability to engage in warfare depends heavily on its space assets, and opined that the country must take steps to "ensure our forces cannot be targeted through an adversarial space strike."

On April 25, 2007, after Senate Majority Leader Harry Reid declared "the war is lost", Hunter wrote "my highest obligation is, like yours, owed to our forces in uniform, especially during this time of war... Given your position of leadership within the United States Government, I find your pronouncement of failure irresponsible and disserving to America's armed forces. In light of the fact that this statement has both been used by our adversaries and has exhibited a marked lack of leadership to U.S. troops, I call on you to resign your leadership position". Hunter further wrote that Reid's declaration "can have no effect but to demoralize the brave men and women, who are honorably fulfilling their mission in Iraq, and to encourage our adversaries... Even if you sincerely believe it to be true, your pronouncement of failure will undoubtedly be used by terrorist leaders to rally their followers – inevitably leading to increased attacks on U.S. and coalition forces".

According to the July 2007 edition of Pacific Flyer, Hunter and Cunningham had pressured the Department of Defense to "... advise DARPA to put an immediate halt to bureaucratic delays and get on with the DuPont Aerospace DP-2 testing." The DP-2 is a Vertical Take-Off and Landing, or VTOL, aircraft designed by DuPont Aerospace to transport special operations forces, but has been repeatedly rejected by the United States Navy, United States Army, United States Air Force, NASA, and DARPA. The design, of which all four constructed models have crashed, has had $63 million appropriated to it since 1991, not including a suggested $6 million for fiscal year 2008. Despite the rejections and reports by multiple military and civilian experts that the aircraft will not fly or hover and will incinerate Special Operations forces rappelling out of the aircraft, Hunter has allegedly repeatedly added funding for the DP-2 in "earmarks" and defended the aircraft in recent testimony to the Subcommittee on Investigations and Oversight of the Committee on Science and Technology. Hunter received $36,000 in donations from DuPont Aerospace. According to his testimony before Congress, Hunter compared the lack of success of the DP-2 to the trials of perfecting the V-22 Osprey. He alleged that such long-term testing is necessary to keep American forces equipped with the best technology.

In April 2023 NPR reported on a "friendly fire" mortar incident in Iraq that occurred in 2004, but had been covered up. Hunter's son Duncan D. Hunter was serving at the command center that ordered the mortar fire, and may have been responsible for the order. Lt. Gen. James Conway, top Marine officer in Iraq, signed off on the report that declined to exact punishments from those responsible for the incident. He did so two days after a personal visit from Hunter. The report was only disseminated to family members three years later, by order of a congressional investigation carried out after Hunter had left the committee. The Marine Corps claimed to be unable to fulfill NPR's FOIA request for the report, as it was said to be "missing."

=== Other legislative actions ===
In November 1997, Hunter was one of eighteen Republicans in the House to co-sponsor a resolution by Bob Barr that sought to launch an impeachment inquiry into President Bill Clinton. The resolution did not specify any charges or allegations. This was an early effort to impeach Clinton, predating the eruption of the Clinton–Lewinsky scandal. The eruption of that scandal would ultimately lead to a more serious effort to impeach Clinton in 1998. On October 8, 1998, Hunter voted in favor of legislation that was passed to open an impeachment inquiry. On December 19, 1998, Hunter voted in favor of all four proposed articles of impeachment against Clinton (only two of which received the needed majority of votes needed to be adopted).

On December 8, 2006, Hunter introduced H.R. 6375, which would have required the defense department to post the purpose of all congressional earmarks in annual defense bills, along with the location and a grade according to the utility of the earmark.

Hunter introduced H.R. 552, The Right to Life Act, on February 2, 2005. The purpose of the bill is to "implement equal protection... for the right to life of each born and preborn human person." In the 109th Congress, the legislation collected 101 cosponsors. Hunter states that The Right to Life Act "would legally define "personhood" as the moment of conception and, therefore, guarantee all constitutional rights and protections, including life, to the unborn without utilizing a constitutional amendment." Hearings for H.R. 552 were scheduled for December 12, 2006, but were cancelled right before the House adjourned.

On April 28, 2004, Hunter introduced legislation that he said could "turn parents into prosecuting attorneys fighting a wave of obscenity." HR 6390 IH, also called the "Parents Empowerment Act", would allow the parent or guardian of a minor to sue in federal court anyone who knowingly disseminates material "that is harmful to minors", or specifically, "any pornographic communication, picture, image, graphic image file, article, recording, writing, or other pornographic matter of any kind", if it is distributed in a way that "a reasonable person can expect a substantial number of minors to be exposed to the material and the minor, as a result to exposure to the material, is likely to suffer personal or emotional injury or injury to mental or moral welfare."

In 1994, Hunter legislatively mandated the construction of 14 miles (23 km) of security fencing on the international land border separating San Diego County and Tijuana, Mexico. In 2005, Hunter introduced legislation calling for the construction of a reinforced fence along the entire U.S.-Mexico border, citing crime statistics as measures of San Diego-Tijuana fence's success. After successfully adding an amendment to a House-passed bill that ultimately stalled in House–Senate negotiations, Hunter's amendment was later incorporated into H.R. 6061, the Secure Fence Act, introduced by New York Congressman Peter T. King. He has said that if he becomes president, the 754-mile (1,213 km) double layer border fence will be built in less than 12 months.

Hunter repeatedly voted against international trade agreements such as the North American Free Trade Agreement (NAFTA), the Central America Free Trade Agreement (CAFTA) and the World Trade Organization (WTO).

=== Cunningham / Wilkes ===
Hunter was not implicated in the Duke Cunningham / Brent R. Wilkes congressional bribery scandal. In December 2005, Hunter directed that the contributions his campaign received from Wilkes and Wade be given to the Injured Marine Semper Fi Fund. "We had options," said Bruce Young, treasurer for Hunter's re-election campaign. "We could keep the money, send it back, send it to the government or send it to a charity. We just felt that because of the situation, we would rather not have the money." More than 100 members of the House and Senate – Republicans and Democrats – accepted money from Wilkes, former MZM Inc. president Mitchell Wade, their relatives, employees or political action committees, according to OpenSecrets, a campaign watchdog group.

== 2008 Presidential campaign ==
On October 30, 2006, Hunter announced his intention to consider running for the Republican nomination for President in 2008. Throughout 2006, his Peace Through Strength PAC raised funds and ran advertising expressing his issues of border security and fair trade. Hunter formally announced his presidential candidacy in Spartanburg, South Carolina, on January 25, 2007.

During 2007, Hunter did well in some county- and state-level straw polls, including a victory at the first GOP Texas Straw Poll on September 1, but those results did not transfer to regular polls at national or state levels.

Conservative commentator Ann Coulter and aviation legend Chuck Yeager both endorsed Hunter as their choice for President, but Hunter received little support from the Republican establishment. Governor Mike Huckabee of Arkansas, who was also seeking the Republican nomination for President, stated that Hunter might play a role in a potential Huckabee administration, noting that he is "extraordinarily well qualified to be Secretary of Defense."

As the caucus and primary season got underway, Hunter began being excluded from Republican debate forums. On January 7, 2008, he held a press conference where reporters thought he would announce his withdrawal. Instead, he surprised pundits by first lambasting ABC News and Fox News not allowing him to participate in previous days' televised debates and then declaring that he would not withdraw from the presidential race: "I am not going to let some arrogant knucklehead executive in a glass office 10 stories above a mall in New York City decide the outcome of this election."

In the Iowa caucuses Hunter finished in seventh place with 524 votes, or one percent of the total. In the New Hampshire primary he finished in seventh and last place again with 1,220 votes, or less than one percent of the total votes cast. In the Wyoming caucuses he had his best showing, coming in third and scoring 1 delegate to the Republican National Convention. However, in the Michigan primary, Hunter once again placed last, coming in eighth behind "Uncommitted" (which received 15,000 more votes than Hunter). On the last day of his campaign, Hunter won just two percent of the vote in the Nevada caucuses, and in the South Carolina primary he received only 0.2 percent of the vote, putting him in last place in both states. He withdrew from the race that night, on January 19, 2008. Hunter subsequently endorsed Huckabee for the Republican nomination.

== Political positions and voting record ==
Hunter voted with a majority of the Republicans 88.7 percent of the time. He was a member of the conservative Republican Study Committee. Hunter is a member of the United States Congressional International Conservation Caucus. Hunter is a staunch conservative. In January 2007, when he announced his presidential candidacy, Hunter had a lifetime rating of 92% from the American Conservative Union, indicating a highly conservative voting record.

=== Economy ===
Hunter was a supporter of the FairTax plan, which would replace all federal income taxes with a federal sales tax.

=== Environment ===
On environmental issues, Hunter score a 9% (out of 100%) lifetime voting score from the League of Conservation Voters, an environmental group. He supporting drilling for oil in the Arctic National Wildlife Refuge (ANWR), voting twice to open the area to drilling. Hunter also voted for legislation reducing protections for endangered species. Hunter twice co-sponsored legislation to end the moratorium on offshore drilling in American waters. Hunter acknowledged the occurrence of climate change, but called the position of former Vice President Al Gore, who agrees with the scientific consensus on climate change, "doomsday alarmism".

=== Foreign relations ===
During his tenure in the House and his unsuccessful campaign for the Republican presidential nomination in 2008, Hunter was a staunch supporter of the Iraq War. Although Hunter generally favored free trade, he condemned Chinese currency devaluation and expressed a desire to protect the U.S. manufacturing sector, and proposed imposing tariffs on imports from China.

=== Healthcare ===
Hunter voted for the 2003 legislation that created Medicare Part D, a partial prescription drug benefit for seniors.

=== LGBT rights ===
Hunter opposed same-sex marriage, and proposed a constitutional amendment to define marriage as between one man and one woman.

=== Military ===
As chairman of the House Armed Services Committee, Hunter "developed a reputation for never meeting a weapons system he didn't like." Hunter used congressional earmarks to "steer money" to defense projects that the Defense Department did not want, including the L-3 Communications Sea Fighter and the DuPont Aerospace DP-1. Hunter defended the use of earmarks by saying that it was the constitutional prerogative of Congress to decide how specifically federal monies should be spent.

=== Social issues ===
==== Abortion ====
He is opposed to abortion in all cases and proposed a constitutional amendment to make abortion illegal. He also introduced a number of bills in the House to restrict abortion. Hunter also opposed embryonic stem cell research, and voted against the Stem Cell Research Enhancement Act of 2005.

==== Immigration ====
Hunter was outspoken in his opposition to illegal immigration, favoring strict measures to combat it. He was a leading voice pushing for faster and more extensive construction of a U.S.–Mexico border fence, naming the border "our biggest homeland security problem" and listing a fence as a top priority. Hunter criticized the U.S. Department of Homeland Security under the George W. Bush administration for planning to build just half of the 700 miles of U.S.–Mexico border barrier authorized by the Secure Fence Act of 2006.

==== Capital punishment ====
Hunter supported the death penalty and voted against legislation to restrict its use.

==== Religious liberty ====
Hunter was a major supporter of the controversial Mount Soledad cross, clashing with advocates for separation of church and state over the issue.

==== Education ====
Hunter favored school vouchers and homeschooling.

== Electoral history ==
Duncan L. Hunter electoral history

1980 United States House of Representatives elections in California
Party	Candidate	Votes	%
Republican	Duncan Hunter	79,713	53.3
Democratic	Lionel Van Deerlin (Incumbent)	69,936	46.7
Total votes		149,649	100.0
Republican gain from Democratic			

1982 United States House of Representatives elections in California
Party	Candidate	Votes	%
Republican	Duncan Hunter (Incumbent)	117,771	68.6
Democratic	Richard Hill	50,148	29.2
Libertarian	Jack R. Sanders	3,839	2.2
Total votes		171,758	100.0
Republican hold			

1984 United States House of Representatives elections in California
Party	Candidate	Votes	%
Republican	Duncan Hunter (Incumbent)	149,011	75.1
Democratic	David W. Guthrie	45,325	22.9
Libertarian	Patrick "Pat" Wright	3,971	2.0
Total votes		198,307	100.0
Republican hold			

1986 United States House of Representatives elections in California
Party	Candidate	Votes	%
Republican	Duncan Hunter (Incumbent)	118,900	58.1
Democratic	Hewitt Fitts Ryan	82,800	40.5
Libertarian	Lee Schwartz	2,975	1.4
Total votes		204,675	100.0
Republican hold			

1988 United States House of Representatives elections in California
Party	Candidate	Votes	%
Republican	Duncan Hunter (Incumbent)	166,451	74.0
Democratic	Pete Lepiscopo	54,012	24.0
Libertarian	Perry Willis	4,440	2.0
Total votes		224,903	100.0
Republican hold			

1990 United States House of Representatives elections in California
Party	Candidate	Votes	%
Republican	Duncan Hunter (Incumbent)	123,591	72.8
Libertarian	Joe Shea	46,068	27.2
Total votes		169,659	100.0
Republican hold			

1992 United States House of Representatives elections in California
Party	Candidate	Votes	%
Republican	Duncan Hunter (incumbent)	112,995	52.9
Democratic	Janet M. Gastil	88,076	41.2
Libertarian	Joe Shea	6,977	3.3
Peace and Freedom	Dennis P. Gretsinger	5,734	2.7
Total votes		213,784	100.0
Republican hold			

1994 United States House of Representatives elections in California
Party	Candidate	Votes	%
Republican	Duncan Hunter (incumbent)	109,201	64.0
Democratic	Janet M. Gastil	53,024	31.1
Libertarian	Joe Shea	5,240	3.0
Peace and Freedom	Art Edelman	3,221	1.9
Total votes		170,686	100.0
Republican hold			

1996 United States House of Representatives elections in California
Party	Candidate	Votes	%
Republican	Duncan Hunter (incumbent)	116,746	65.5
Democratic	Darity Wesley	53,104	29.8
Peace and Freedom	Janice Jordan	3,649	2.1
Libertarian	Dante Ridley	3,329	1.8
Natural Law	Peter Ballantyne	1,493	0.8
Total votes		178,321	100.0
Republican hold			

1998 United States House of Representatives elections in California
Party	Candidate	Votes	%
Republican	Duncan Hunter (incumbent)	116,251	75.7
Libertarian	Lynn Badler	21,933	14.3
Natural Law	Adrienne Pelton	15,380	10.0
Republican	Bill Warren (write-in)	4	0.0
Total votes		153,568	100.0
Republican hold			

2000 United States House of Representatives elections in California
Party	Candidate	Votes	%
Republican	Duncan Hunter (incumbent)	131,345	64.8
Democratic	Craig Barkacs	63,537	31.3
Libertarian	Michael Benoit	5,995	2.9
Natural Law	Robert A. Sherman	2,117	1.0
Total votes		202,994	100.0
Republican hold			

2002 United States House of Representatives elections in California
Party	Candidate	Votes	%
Republican	Duncan Hunter (incumbent)	118,561	70.2
Democratic	Peter Moore-Kochlacs	43,526	25.8
Libertarian	Michael Benoit	6,923	4.0
Total votes		169,010	100.0
Republican hold			

2004 United States House of Representatives elections in California
Party	Candidate	Votes	%
Republican	Duncan Hunter (incumbent)	187,799	67.0
Democratic	Brian S. Keliher	74,857	27.7
Libertarian	Michael Benoit	8,782	3.3
Total votes		271,438	100.0
Republican hold			

2006 United States House of Representatives elections in California
Party	Candidate	Votes	%
Republican	Duncan Hunter (incumbent)	123,696	64.7
Democratic	John Rinaldi	61,208	32.0
Libertarian	Michael Benoit	6,465	3.3
Total votes		191,369	100.0
Republican hold			

U.S. House of Representatives
Preceded by Lionel Van Deerlin	Member of the U.S. House of Representatives from California's 42nd congressional district 1981–1983	Succeeded by Dan Lungren
New constituency	Member of the U.S. House of Representatives from California's 45th congressional district 1983–1993	Succeeded by Dana Rohrabacher
New constituency	Member of the U.S. House of Representatives from California's 52nd congressional district 1993–2009	Succeeded by Duncan D. Hunter
Preceded by Bob Stump	Chair of the House Armed Services Committee; 2003–2007	Succeeded by Ike Skelton
Preceded by Ike Skelton	Ranking Member of the House Armed Services Committee; 2007–2009	Succeeded by John McHugh
Party political offices
Preceded by Mickey Edwards	Chair of the House Republican Research Committee; 1989–1995	Position abolished
U.S. order of precedence (ceremonial)
Preceded by Bill Thomas as Former U.S. Representative	Order of precedence of the United States as Former U.S. Representative	Succeeded by Earl Blumenauer as Former U.S. Representative
