= Foothill (disambiguation) =

A foothill is a hill at the base of a mountain or mountain range.

Foothill or foothills may also refer to:

== Places ==
- Foothills, Alberta, a locality in Yellowhead County
- Foothills County, a municipal district in Alberta
- Foothills (electoral district), a federal electoral district in Alberta
- Foothills (North Carolina), a region between the Piedmont Plateau and the Appalachians
- Foothill, Salt Lake City, a neighborhood of East Bench, Utah

== Roads ==
- Foothill Boulevard (Southern California), a major road in Southern California
- Foothill Drive, also called Foothill Boulevard, in Salt Lake City, Utah
- Foothill Expressway, County Route G5 in Santa Clara County, California
- Foothill Road, a state highway in Douglas County, Nevada
- Foothill Toll Road, a state highway in Orange County, California

== Other uses ==
- Foothill College, a public community college in Los Altos Hills, California
- Foothill Extension, a light rail line in Los Angeles
- Foothill Farm, a historic farmhouse in Dublin, New Hampshire
- Foothill Malls, a series of traffic medians in Queens, New York
- Foothill Observatory, an astronomical observatory in Los Altos Hills, California
- Foothill Productions, an American film company
- Foothills (album), a 2020 album by The Bats
- "Foothills" (song), a 2006 song by Violent Femmes
- Foothills Bank, a division of Glacier Bancorp
- Foothills Park, a nature preserve in Palo Alto, California
- Foothills Parkway, a national parkway in the Great Smoky Mountains, Tennessee
- Foothills Stadium, a stadium in Calgary, Alberta
- Foothills Trail, a National Recreation Trail in the Carolinas, United States

== See also ==
- Foothills Academy (disambiguation)
- Foothill Elementary School (disambiguation)
- Foothill High School (disambiguation)
- Foothills Mall (disambiguation)
