= Electoral history of Ken Calvert =

American political record

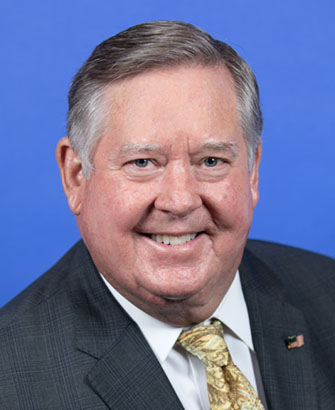

Ken Calvert is an American politician from California who is currently serving in the U.S. House of Representatives since 1993. He has served several congressional districts in California, including the 43rd district from 1993 to 2003, the 44th district from 2003 to 2013, the 42nd district from 2013 to 2023, and the 41st district since 2023. Calvert has served the Inland Empire for the entirety of his term in office.

== U.S. House of Representatives ==
=== 1990s ===
1992 California's 43rd congressional district election
Primary election
Party	Candidate	Votes	%
Republican	Ken Calvert	13,387	27.6
Republican	S. Joseph Khoury	10,624	21.9
Republican	Bob Lynn	8,784	18.1
Republican	Larry P. Arnn	8,750	18.1
Republican	Bill Franklin	2,694	5.6
Republican	Daniel Hantman	2,270	4.7
Republican	William E. Jones	1,958	4.0
Total votes		48,467	100.0
General election
Republican	Ken Calvert	88,987	46.7
Democratic	Mark Takano	88,468	46.4
American Independent	Gary R. Odom	6,095	3.2
Libertarian	Gene L. Berkman	4,989	2.6
No party	John Schwab (write-in)	2,100	1.1
Total votes		190,639	100.0
Republican hold			

1994 California's 43rd congressional district election
Primary election
Party	Candidate	Votes	%
Republican	Ken Calvert (incumbent)	22,149	51.0
Republican	Joe Khoury	21,265	49.0
Total votes		43,414	100.0
General election
Republican	Ken Calvert (incumbent)	84,500	54.7
Democratic	Mark Takano	59,342	38.4
Libertarian	Gene L. Berkman	9,636	6.2
No party	John Schwab (write-in)	767	0.5
No party	Velma Hickey (write-in)	141	0.1
Total votes		154,386	100.0
Republican hold			

1996 California's 43rd congressional district election
Primary election
Party	Candidate	Votes	%
Republican	Ken Calvert (incumbent)	39,364	74.4
Republican	David Davis	13,517	25.6
Total votes		52,881	100.0
General election
Republican	Ken Calvert (incumbent)	97,247	54.7
Democratic	Guy Kimborough	67,422	37.9
Natural Law	Annie Wallack	6,576	3.7
Peace and Freedom	Kevin Akin	3,309	1.9
Libertarian	Gene L. Berkman	3,086	1.7
No party	Colleen Cummings (write-in)	84	0.0
Total votes		177,724	100.0
Republican hold			

1998 California's 43rd congressional district election
Primary election
Party	Candidate	Votes	%
Republican	Ken Calvert (incumbent)	36,952	55.6
Republican	Joe Khoury	23,016	34.6
Republican	R. M. Cook Barela	6,480	9.8
Total votes		66,448	100.0
General election
Republican	Ken Calvert (incumbent)	83,012	55.7
Democratic	Mike Rayburn	56,373	37.8
Green	Phill Courtney	5,508	3.7
Natural Law	Annie Wallack	4,178	2.8
Total votes		149,071	100.0
Republican hold			

=== 2000s ===
2000 California's 43rd congressional district election
Primary election
Party	Candidate	Votes	%
Republican	Ken Calvert (incumbent)	73,660	67.0
Republican	Martin Collen	31,907	29.0
Republican	Khalid Jafri	4,448	4.0
Total votes		110,015	100.0
General election
Republican	Ken Calvert (incumbent)	140,201	73.7
Libertarian	Bill Reed	29,755	15.6
Natural Law	Nat Adam	20,376	10.7
Total votes		190,332	100.0
Republican hold			

2002 California's 44th congressional district election
Primary election
Party	Candidate	Votes	%
Republican	Ken Calvert (incumbent)	30,967	70.2
Republican	Martin Collen	11,106	25.1
Republican	Khalid Jafri	2,087	4.7
Total votes		44,160	100.0
General election
Republican	Ken Calvert (incumbent)	76,686	63.7
Democratic	Louis Vandenberg	38,021	31.6
Green	Phill Courtney	5,756	4.7
Total votes		120,463	100.0
Republican hold			

2004 California's 44th congressional district election
Primary election
Party	Candidate	Votes	%
Republican	Ken Calvert (incumbent)	49,107	85.8
Republican	David J. Rizzo	8,132	14.2
Total votes		57,239	100.0
General election
Republican	Ken Calvert (incumbent)	138,768	61.7
Democratic	Louis Vandenberg	78,796	35.0
Peace and Freedom	Kevin Akin	7,559	3.3
Total votes		225,123	100.0
Republican hold			

2006 California's 44th congressional district election
Primary election
Party	Candidate	Votes	%
Republican	Ken Calvert (incumbent)	35,444	100.0
Total votes		35,444	100.0
General election
Republican	Ken Calvert (incumbent)	89,555	60.0
Democratic	Louis Vandenberg	55,275	37.0
Peace and Freedom	Kevin Akin	4,486	3.0
Total votes		149,316	100.0
Republican hold			

2008 California's 44th congressional district election
Primary election
Party	Candidate	Votes	%
Republican	Ken Calvert (incumbent)	32,702	100.0
Total votes		32,702	100.0
General election
Republican	Ken Calvert (incumbent)	129,937	51.2
Democratic	Bill Hedrick	123,890	48.8
Total votes		253,827	100.0
Republican hold			

=== 2010s ===
2010 California's 44th congressional district election
Primary election
Party	Candidate	Votes	%
Republican	Ken Calvert (incumbent)	37,327	66.3
Republican	Chris Riggs	18,994	33.7
Total votes		56,321	100.0
General election
Republican	Ken Calvert (incumbent)	107,482	55.7
Democratic	Bill Hedrick	85,784	44.3
Total votes		193,266	100.0
Republican hold			

2012 California's 42nd congressional district election
Primary election
Party	Candidate	Votes	%
Republican	Ken Calvert (incumbent)	35,392	51.3
Democratic	Michael Williamson	9,860	14.3
Democratic	Cliff Smith	7,377	10.7
Republican	Clayton Thibodeau	6,374	9.2
Republican	Eva Johnson	5,678	8.2
No party preference	Curt Novack	4,254	6.2
Total votes		69,035	100.0
General election
Republican	Ken Calvert (incumbent)	130,245	60.6
Democratic	Michael Williamson	84,702	39.4
Total votes		214,947	100.0
Republican hold			

2014 California's 42nd congressional district election
Primary election
Party	Candidate	Votes	%
Republican	Ken Calvert (incumbent)	37,506	67.5
Democratic	Tim Sheridan	8,788	15.8
Democratic	Chris Marquez	6,118	11.0
Democratic	Kerri Condley	3,150	5.7
Republican	Floyd Harvey (write-in)	8	0.0
Total votes		55,570	100.0
General election
Republican	Ken Calvert (incumbent)	74,540	65.7
Democratic	Tim Sheridan	38,850	34.3
Total votes		113,390	100.0
Republican hold			

2016 California's 42nd congressional district election
Primary election
Party	Candidate	Votes	%
Republican	Ken Calvert (incumbent)	66,418	54.9
Democratic	Tim Sheridan	45,389	37.5
No party preference	Kerri Condley	9,076	7.5
Total votes		120,883	100.0
General election
Republican	Ken Calvert (incumbent)	149,547	58.8
Democratic	Tim Sheridan	104,689	41.2
Total votes		254,236	100.0
Republican hold			

2018 California's 42nd congressional district election
Primary election
Party	Candidate	Votes	%
Republican	Ken Calvert (incumbent)	70,289	60.8
Democratic	Julia C. Peacock	30,237	26.1
Democratic	Norman Quintero	9,540	8.2
No party preference	Matt Woody	5,587	4.8
Total votes		115,653	100.0
General election
Republican	Ken Calvert (incumbent)	131,040	56.5
Democratic	Julia C. Peacock	100,892	43.5
Total votes		231,932	100.0
Republican hold			

=== 2020s ===
2020 California's 42nd congressional district election
Primary election
Party	Candidate	Votes	%
Republican	Ken Calvert (incumbent)	97,781	58.2
Democratic	William "Liam" O'Mara	38,506	22.9
Democratic	Regina Marston	31,587	18.8
Total votes		167,874	100.0
General election
Republican	Ken Calvert (incumbent)	210,274	57.1
Democratic	William "Liam" O'Mara	157,773	42.9
Total votes		368,047	100.0
Republican hold			

2022 California's 41st congressional district election
Primary election
Party	Candidate	Votes	%
Republican	Ken Calvert (incumbent)	72,700	48.2
Democratic	Will Rollins	45,923	30.4
Democratic	Shrina Kurani	23,483	15.6
Republican	John Michael Lucio	6,880	4.6
No party preference	Anna Nevenic	1,862	1.2
Total votes		150,850	100.0
General election
Republican	Ken Calvert (incumbent)	123,869	52.3
Democratic	Will Rollins	112,769	47.7
Total votes		236,638	100.0
Republican gain from Democratic			

2024 California's 41st congressional district election
Primary election
Party	Candidate	Votes	%
Republican	Ken Calvert (incumbent)	85,959	53.0
Democratic	Will Rollins	62,245	38.4
Democratic	Anna Nevenic	13,862	8.6
Total votes		162,066	100.0
General election
Republican	Ken Calvert (incumbent)	183,216	51.7
Democratic	Will Rollins	171,229	48.3
Total votes		354,445	100.0
Republican hold			
