= Coronita =

- Corona (beer)
- Coronita, California
- Coronita (sg.), (in rum, pl form:coronite), foreign word for care item "teeth bracelet superior and teeth bracelet inferior."
