= Foothill Elementary School =

Foothill Elementary School may refer to a number of elementary schools:

- Foothill Elementary School, Boulder, Colorado, part of Boulder Valley School District
- Foothill Elementary School, Corona, California, part of Corona-Norco Unified School District
- Foothill Elementary School, Monterey, California, part of Monterey Peninsula Unified School District
- Foothill Elementary School, Pittsburg, California, part of Pittsburg Unified School District
- Foothill Elementary School, Riverside, California, part of Alvord Unified School District
- Foothill Elementary School, Santa Barbara, California, part of Goleta Union School District
- Foothill Elementary School, Saratoga, California, part of Saratoga Union Elementary School District

== See also ==
- Foothill High School (disambiguation)
