= Lakeland Village, California =

Lakeland Village
- census-designated place
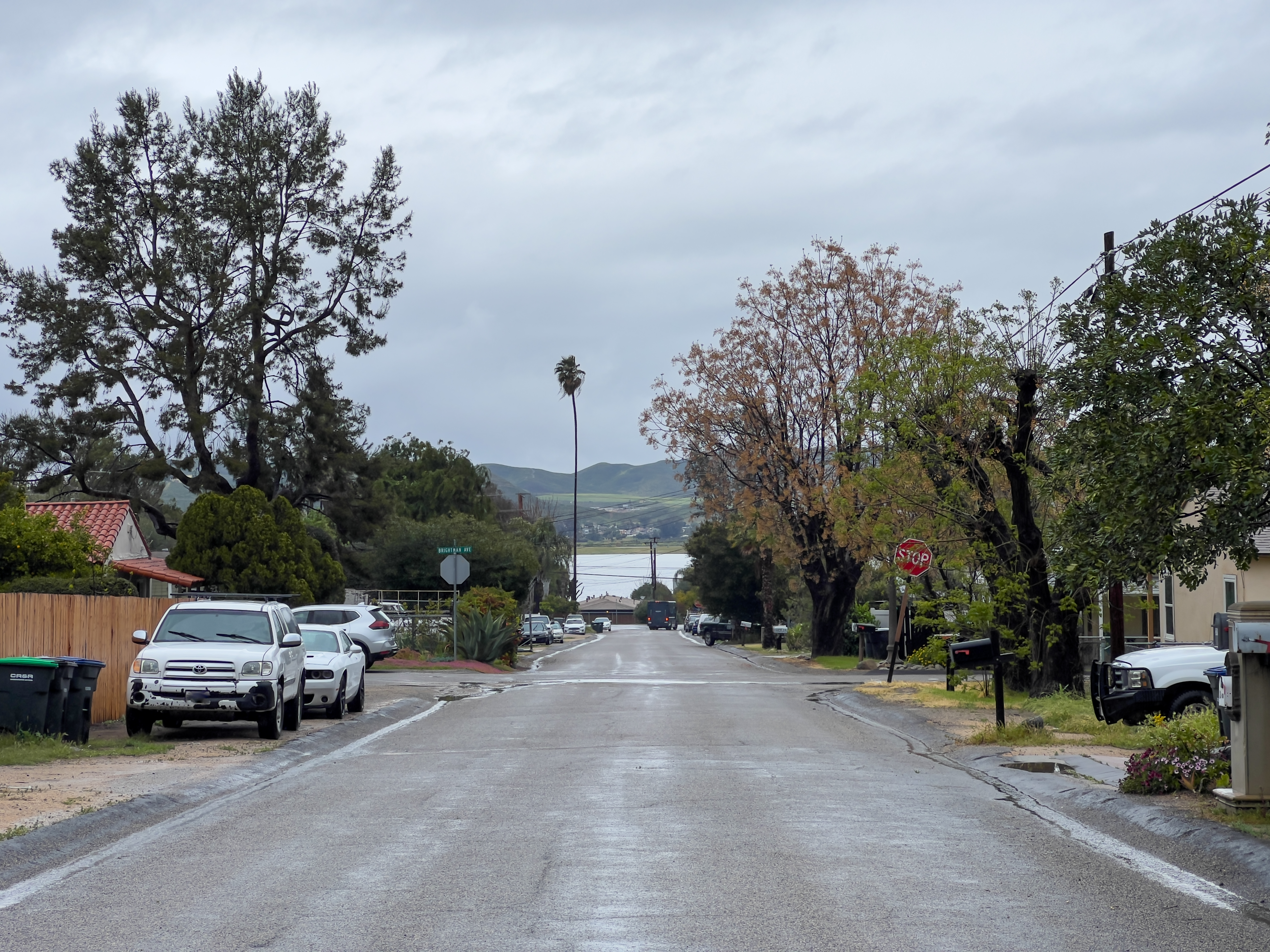
- Lakeland Village neighborhood, with Lake Elsinore in the background
- Interactive map of Lakeland Village
- Location in the United States
- Coordinates: 33°38′19″N 117°20′38″W
- Country: United States
- State: California
- County: Riverside

Area
  - Total: 9.040 sq mi (23.413 km^{2})
  - Land: 8.775 sq mi (22.727 km^{2})
  - Water: 0.265 sq mi (0.686 km^{2}) 2.93%
- Elevation: 1,283 ft (391 m)

Population (2020)
  - Total: 12,364
  - Density: 1,425/sq mi (550/km^{2})
- Time zone: UTC-8 (PST)
  - Summer (DST): UTC-7 (PDT)
- ZIP code: 92530
- Area code: 951
- FIPS code: 06-39598
- GNIS feature ID: 1660880

Lakeland Village is a census-designated place (CDP) in Riverside County, California, United States. The population was 12,364 at the 2020 census, up from 11,541 at the 2010 census.

== Geography ==
According to the United States Census Bureau, the CDP has a total area of 9.0 square miles (23 km^{2}), of which, 8.8 square miles (23 km^{2}) of it is land and 0.27 square miles (0.70 km^{2}) of it (2.93%) is water. It is next to the city of Lake Elsinore. Rome Hill is a 1,444 feet/440 meters hill near the southwest part of Lake Elsinore.

== Demographics ==
Historical population
Census	Pop.	Note	%±
1960	3,539		—
1970	1,724		−51.3%
1980	2,796		62.2%
1990	5,159		84.5%
2000	5,626		9.1%
2010	11,541		105.1%
2020	12,364		7.1%
U.S. Decennial Census; 1860–1870 1880-1890; 1900 1910 1920; 1930 1940 1950; 1960 1970 1980; 1990 2000 2010

Lakeland Village first appeared as an unincorporated place in the 1960 U.S. census; and listed as a census designated place in the 1980 U.S. census.

=== Racial and ethnic composition ===
Lakeland Village CDP, California – Racial and ethnic composition Note: the US Census treats Hispanic/Latino as an ethnic category. This table excludes Latinos from the racial categories and assigns them to a separate category. Hispanics/Latinos may be of any race.
Race / Ethnicity (NH = Non-Hispanic)	Pop 2000	Pop 2010	Pop 2020	% 2000	% 2010	% 2020
White alone (NH)	3,560	5,662	4,738	63.28%	49.06%	38.32%
Black or African American alone (NH)	92	257	293	1.64%	2.23%	2.37%
Native American or Alaska Native alone (NH)	51	50	48	0.91%	0.43%	0.39%
Asian alone (NH)	50	142	208	0.89%	1.23%	1.68%
Native Hawaiian or Pacific Islander alone (NH)	4	17	26	0.07%	0.15%	0.21%
Other race alone (NH)	5	30	60	0.09%	0.26%	0.49%
Mixed race or Multiracial (NH)	121	269	410	2.15%	2.33%	3.32%
Hispanic or Latino (any race)	1,743	5,114	6,581	30.98%	44.31%	53.23%
Total	5,626	11,541	12,364	100.00%	100.00%	100.00%

=== 2020 census ===
As of the 2020 census, Lakeland Village had a population of 12,364. The population density was 1,409.0 inhabitants per square mile (544.0/km^{2}). The median age was 35.4 years; 25.7% of residents were under the age of 18 and 12.1% were 65 years of age or older. For every 100 females, there were 103.6 males, and for every 100 females age 18 and over, there were 101.1 males age 18 and over.

95.6% of residents lived in urban areas, while 4.4% lived in rural areas.

The census reported that 12,355 people (99.9%) lived in households, 9 people (0.1%) lived in non-institutionalized group quarters, and no one was institutionalized. There were 3,912 households, of which 37.4% had children under age 18 living in them. Of all households, 47.6% were married-couple households, 8.6% were cohabiting-couple households, 21.4% had a male householder with no spouse or partner present, and 22.4% had a female householder with no spouse or partner present. About 20.6% of households were made up of individuals, and 7.5% had someone living alone who was 65 years of age or older. The average household size was 3.16, and there were 2,841 families (72.6% of all households).

There were 4,146 housing units at an average density of 472.5 units per square mile (182.4 units/km^{2}), of which 3,912 (94.4%) were occupied. Of occupied units, 62.4% were owner-occupied and 37.6% were occupied by renters. Overall, 5.6% of housing units were vacant; the homeowner vacancy rate was 1.2% and the rental vacancy rate was 2.3%.

Racial composition as of the 2020 census
Race	Number	Percent
White	5,873	47.5%
Black or African American	320	2.6%
American Indian and Alaska Native	275	2.2%
Asian	245	2.0%
Native Hawaiian and Other Pacific Islander	28	0.2%
Some other race	3,338	27.0%
Two or more races	2,285	18.5%

=== Demographic estimates ===
In 2023, the US Census Bureau estimated that 22.1% of the population were foreign-born. Of all people aged 5 or older, 56.8% spoke only English at home, 41.7% spoke Spanish, 0.8% spoke other Indo-European languages, 0.7% spoke Asian or Pacific Islander languages, and 0.1% spoke other languages. Of those aged 25 or older, 79.1% were high school graduates and 14.7% had a bachelor's degree.

=== Income and poverty ===
The median household income in 2023 was $83,371, and the per capita income was $33,285. About 10.0% of families and 10.3% of the population were below the poverty line.

=== 2010 census ===
At the 2010 census Lakeland Village had a population of 11,541. The population density was 1,320.7 inhabitants per square mile (509.9/km^{2}). The racial makeup of Lakeland Village was 7,764 (67.3%) White, 285 (2.5%) African American, 131 (1.1%) Native American, 168 (1.5%) Asian, 21 (0.2%) Pacific Islander, 2,575 (22.3%) from other races, and 597 (5.2%) from two or more races. Hispanic or Latino of any race were 5,114 persons (44.3%).

The census reported that 11,403 people (98.8% of the population) lived in households, 4 (0%) lived in non-institutionalized group quarters, and 134 (1.2%) were institutionalized.

There were 3,538 households, 1,547 (43.7%) had children under the age of 18 living in them, 1,815 (51.3%) were opposite-sex married couples living together, 538 (15.2%) had a female householder with no husband present, 281 (7.9%) had a male householder with no wife present. There were 343 (9.7%) unmarried opposite-sex partnerships, and 24 (0.7%) same-sex married couples or partnerships. 623 households (17.6%) were one person and 180 (5.1%) had someone living alone who was 65 or older. The average household size was 3.22. There were 2,634 families (74.4% of households); the average family size was 3.62.

The age distribution was 3,267 people (28.3%) under the age of 18, 1,216 people (10.5%) aged 18 to 24, 3,070 people (26.6%) aged 25 to 44, 3,076 people (26.7%) aged 45 to 64, and 912 people (7.9%) who were 65 or older. The median age was 33.0 years. For every 100 females, there were 103.3 males. For every 100 females age 18 and over, there were 103.3 males.

There were 3,967 housing units at an average density of 454.0 per square mile, of the occupied units 2,284 (64.6%) were owner-occupied and 1,254 (35.4%) were rented. The homeowner vacancy rate was 3.8%; the rental vacancy rate was 9.3%. 7,152 people (62.0% of the population) lived in owner-occupied housing units and 4,251 people (36.8%) lived in rental housing units.

== Government ==
In the California State Legislature, Lakeland Village is in the 32nd senatorial district, represented by Republican Kelly Seyarto, and in the 63rd Assembly district, represented by Republican Natasha Johnson.

In the United States House of Representatives, Lakeland Village is in California's 41st congressional district, represented by Republican Ken Calvert.

== Education ==
It is in the Lake Elsinore Unified School District.
