= Adams Elementary School =

There are a number of Elementary schools named Adams Elementary School:

- Adams Elementary School (Santa Ana, California)
- Adams Elementary School (Corona, California)
- Adams Elementary School (Coon Rapids, Minnesota)
- Adams Elementary School (Cary, North Carolina)
- Adams Elementary School (Midland, Michigan)
- Adams Elementary School (Seattle, Washington)
- Adams Elementary School (Glen Allen, Virginia)
- Adams Elementary School (Cleburne, Texas)
- Adams Elementary School (Eugene, Oregon)
