= El Cerrito, Riverside County, California =

Census-designated place in California, United States

El Cerrito
- census-designated place
- Location in Riverside County and the state of California
- Coordinates: 33°50′22″N 117°31′20″W
- Country: United States
- State: California
- County: Riverside

Area
  - Total: 2.826 sq mi (7.319 km^{2})
  - Land: 2.610 sq mi (6.761 km^{2})
  - Water: 0.216 sq mi (0.559 km^{2}) 7.63%
- Elevation: 860 ft (262 m)

Population (2020)
  - Total: 5,058
  - Density: 1,938/sq mi (748.1/km^{2})
- Time zone: UTC-8 (PST)
  - Summer (DST): UTC-7 (PDT)
- ZIP code: 92881
- Area code: 951
- GNIS feature ID: 2408053

El Cerrito (Spanish for 'The Little Hill') is a census-designated place (CDP) in the Inland Empire region of Riverside County, California, United States. It is an unincorporated area mostly surrounded by the city of Corona. The population was 5,058 at the 2020 census, down from 5,100 at the 2010 census.

== Geography ==
El Cerrito is located southeast of downtown Corona and about 15 miles (25 km) southwest of the city of Riverside.

According to the United States Census Bureau, the CDP has a total area of 2.8 square miles (7.3 km^{2}), of which, 2.6 square miles (6.7 km^{2}) of it is land and 0.2 square miles (0.52 km^{2}) of it (7.63%) is water.

== Demographics ==
Historical population
Census	Pop.	Note	%±
1990	4,490		—
2000	4,590		2.2%
2010	5,100		11.1%
2020	5,058		−0.8%
U.S. Decennial Census; 1860–1870 1880-1890; 1900 1910 1920; 1930 1940 1950; 1960 1970 1980; 1990 2000 2010

El Cerrito first appeared as a census designated place in the 2010 U.S. census.

=== Racial and ethnic composition ===
El Cerrito CDP, California – Racial and ethnic composition Note: the US Census treats Hispanic/Latino as an ethnic category. This table excludes Latinos from the racial categories and assigns them to a separate category. Hispanics/Latinos may be of any race.
Race / Ethnicity (NH = Non-Hispanic)	Pop 2000	Pop 2010	Pop 2020	% 2000	% 2010	% 2020
White alone (NH)	2,601	2,181	1,690	56.67%	42.76%	33.41%
Black or African American alone (NH)	98	83	101	2.14%	1.63%	2.00%
Native American or Alaska Native alone (NH)	21	17	29	0.46%	0.33%	0.57%
Asian alone (NH)	54	83	182	1.18%	1.63%	3.60%
Native Hawaiian or Pacific Islander alone (NH)	9	11	7	0.20%	0.22%	0.14%
Other race alone (NH)	8	16	27	0.17%	0.31%	0.53%
Mixed race or Multiracial (NH)	91	52	164	1.98%	1.02%	3.24%
Hispanic or Latino (any race)	1,708	2,657	2,858	37.21%	52.10%	56.50%
Total	4,590	5,100	5,058	100.00%	100.00%	100.00%

=== 2020 ===
The 2020 United States census reported that El Cerrito had a population of 5,058. The population density was 1,937.9 inhabitants per square mile (748.2/km^{2}). The racial makeup of El Cerrito was 44.2% White, 2.2% African American, 2.6% Native American, 3.8% Asian, 0.2% Pacific Islander, 26.9% from other races, and 20.2% from two or more races. Hispanic or Latino of any race were 56.5% of the population.

The census reported that 99.6% of the population lived in households, 0.3% lived in non-institutionalized group quarters, and 0.2% were institutionalized.

There were 1,408 households, out of which 39.6% included children under the age of 18, 60.6% were married-couple households, 6.0% were cohabiting couple households, 18.7% had a female householder with no partner present, and 14.7% had a male householder with no partner present. 11.4% of households were one person, and 5.8% were one person aged 65 or older. The average household size was 3.58. There were 1,182 families (83.9% of all households).

The age distribution was 22.6% under the age of 18, 9.7% aged 18 to 24, 25.5% aged 25 to 44, 27.8% aged 45 to 64, and 14.5% who were 65 years of age or older. The median age was 38.3 years. For every 100 females, there were 101.8 males.

There were 1,464 housing units at an average density of 560.9 units per square mile (216.6 units/km^{2}), of which 1,408 (96.2%) were occupied. Of these, 81.0% were owner-occupied, and 19.0% were occupied by renters.

In 2023, the US Census Bureau estimated that the median household income was $122,472, and the per capita income was $37,484. About 3.1% of families and 5.4% of the population were below the poverty line.

=== 2010 ===
At the 2010 census El Cerrito had a population of 5,100. The population density was 1,836.1 inhabitants per square mile (708.9/km^{2}). The racial makeup of El Cerrito was 3,542 (69.5%) White, 91 (1.8%) African American, 54 (1.1%) Native American, 95 (1.9%) Asian, 11 (0.2%) Pacific Islander, 1,122 (22.0%) from other races, and 185 (3.6%) from two or more races. Hispanic or Latino of any race were 2,657 persons (52.1%).

The census reported that 5,088 people (99.8% of the population) lived in households, 12 (0.2%) lived in non-institutionalized group quarters, and no one was institutionalized.

There were 1,386 households, 648 (46.8%) had children under the age of 18 living in them, 937 (67.6%) were opposite-sex married couples living together, 153 (11.0%) had a female householder with no husband present, 97 (7.0%) had a male householder with no wife present. There were 71 (5.1%) unmarried opposite-sex partnerships, and 13 (0.9%) same-sex married couples or partnerships. 126 households (9.1%) were one person and 50 (3.6%) had someone living alone who was 65 or older. The average household size was 3.67. There were 1,187 families (85.6% of households); the average family size was 3.82.

The age distribution was 1,380 people (27.1%) under the age of 18, 548 people (10.7%) aged 18 to 24, 1,274 people (25.0%) aged 25 to 44, 1,387 people (27.2%) aged 45 to 64, and 511 people (10.0%) who were 65 or older. The median age was 35.7 years. For every 100 females, there were 109.0 males. For every 100 females age 18 and over, there were 104.6 males.

There were 1,449 housing units at an average density of 521.7 per square mile, of the occupied units 1,099 (79.3%) were owner-occupied and 287 (20.7%) were rented. The homeowner vacancy rate was 1.2%; the rental vacancy rate was 4.0%. 3,991 people (78.3% of the population) lived in owner-occupied housing units and 1,097 people (21.5%) lived in rental housing units.

== Government ==
=== Municipal ===
In the Riverside County Board of Supervisors, El Cerrito is in the Second District, represented by Karen Spiegel.

=== State ===
In the California State Legislature, El Cerrito is in the 31st senatorial district, represented by Democrat Sabrina Cervantes, and in the 58th Assembly district, represented by Republican Leticia Castillo.

=== Federal ===
In the United States House of Representatives, El Cerrito is in California's 41st congressional district, represented by Republican Ken Calvert. Democrats Alex Padilla and Adam Schiff represent California in the United States Senate.

== Education ==
It is in the Corona-Norco Unified School District.
