= California's 41st congressional district =

U.S. House district for California

Coordinates: 34.6°N 116°W

- Interactive map of district boundaries
- Representative: Ken Calvert; R–Corona
- Population (2025): 824,530
- Median household income: $110,027
- Ethnicity: 44.0% White; 38.3% Hispanic; 7.8% Asian; 4.8% Black; 4.0% Two or more races; 1.2% other
- Cook PVI: R+2

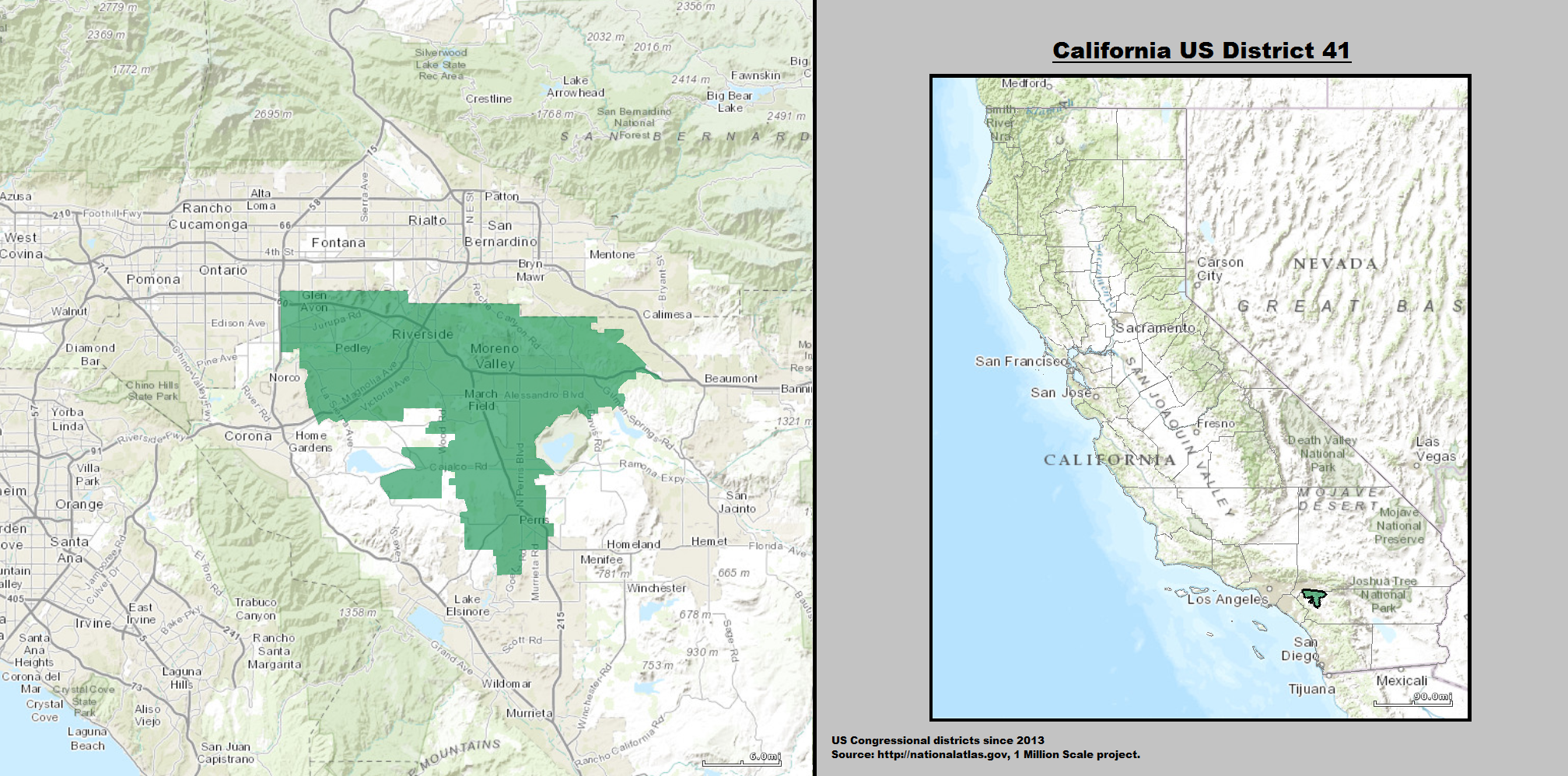
California's 41st congressional district until 2023

California's 41st congressional district is a congressional district in Riverside County, in the U.S. state of California. The district is currently represented by Republican Ken Calvert.

The 41st district currently includes most of the wealthy, majority-white parts of the Coachella Valley, including the cities of Palm Springs, Rancho Mirage, Palm Desert, Indian Wells, and La Quinta. The district then stretches through the sparsely inhabited regions of the San Jacinto Mountains before taking in the vast majority of Corona and its sphere of influence, including Norco, Lake Elsinore, Canyon Lake, and portions of Eastvale. The edges of the district also stretch further south to take in portions of the Perris and Temecula Valleys, such as Menifee, Wildomar, and small portions of Murrieta. The representative for the 41st is Ken Calvert, who was redistricted from the 42nd district.

The district is considered a swing seat, and the 2024 race was rated as a "Toss Up" by the Cook Political Report, although a Democrat has not won election in this seat since redistricting.

== Recent election results from statewide races ==
=== 2023–2027 boundaries ===
Year	Office	Results
2008	President	McCain 52% - 47%
2010	Governor	Whitman 56% - 38%
2010	Lt. Governor	Maldonado 50% - 38%
2010	Secretary of State	Dunn 54% - 39%
2010	Attorney General	Cooley 59% - 33%
2010	Treasurer	Walters 50% - 44%
2010	Controller	Strickland 52% - 39%
2012	President	Romney 55% - 45%
2014	Governor	Kashkari 57% - 43%
2016	President	Trump 51% - 45%
2018	Governor	Cox 55% - 45%
2018	Attorney General	Bailey 53% - 47%
2020	President	Trump 50% - 49%
2022	Senate (Reg.)	Meuser 53% - 47%
2022	Governor	Dahle 55% - 45%
2022	Lt. Governor	Underwood Jacobs 54% - 46%
2022	Secretary of State	Bernosky 54% - 46%
2022	Attorney General	Hochman 55% - 45%
2022	Treasurer	Guerrero 55% - 45%
2022	Controller	Chen 56% - 44%
2024	President	Trump 52% - 46%
2024	Senate (Reg.)	Garvey 54% - 46%

=== 2027–2033 boundaries ===
Year	Office	Results
2008	President	Obama 57% - 43%
2010	Governor	Brown 55% - 37%
2010	Lt. Governor	Newsom 54% - 32%
2010	Secretary of State	Bowen 53% - 37%
2010	Attorney General	Harris 58% - 30%
2010	Treasurer	Lockyer 51% - 40%
2010	Controller	Chiang 47% - 41%
2012	President	Obama 59% - 41%
2014	Governor	Brown 58% - 42%
2016	President	Clinton 57% - 36%
2018	Governor	Newsom 63% - 37%
2018	Attorney General	Becerra 61% - 39%
2020	President	Biden 58% - 39%
2022	Senate (Reg.)	Padilla 64% - 36%
2022	Governor	Newsom 67% - 33%
2022	Lt. Governor	Kounalakis 65% - 35%
2022	Secretary of State	Weber 64% - 36%
2022	Attorney General	Rob Bonta 65% - 35%
2022	Treasurer	Ma 65% - 35%
2022	Controller	Cohen 66% - 34%
2024	President	Harris 61% - 36%
2024	Senate (Reg.)	Schiff 64% - 36%

== Composition ==
FIPS County Code	County	Seat	Population
65	Riverside	Riverside	2,492,442

Under the 2020 redistricting, California's 41st congressional district is located entirely in western Riverside County, in the Inland Empire of Southern California. It includes the cities of Wildomar, Canyon Lake, Menifee, Palm Springs, Palm Desert, La Quinta, Lake Elsinore, Norco, Calimesa, Rancho Mirage, Indian Wells, most of Corona, southern Eastvale, and western Riverside; and the census-designated places Cherry Valley, Nuevo, Homeland, Sage, Idyllwild-Pine Cove, Woodcrest, Coronita, El Sobrante, El Cerrito, Lake Mathews, Temescal Valley, Warm Springs, Lakeland Village, Lakeview, Romoland, Green Acres, French Valley, Anza, and Mountain Center.

Riverside County is split between this district, the 25th district, the 39th district, and the 48th district. The 41st and 25th are partitioned by Terwillinger Rd, Bailey Rd, Candelaria, Elder Creek Rd, Bonny Ln, Tule Peak Rd, Eastgate Trail, Goldrush Rd, Rule Valley Rd, Laura Ln, Dove Dr, Lago Grande, Barbara Trail, Valley Dr, Foolish Pleasure Rd, Highway 371, Gelding Way, Puckit Dr, Indian Rd, Wellman Rd, El Toro Rd, Burnt Valley Rd, Cahuilla Rd, Highway 74, Bull Canyon Rd, Santa Rosa-San Jacinto Mountains National Monument, Fred Waring Dr, Washington St, Highway 10, Davall Dr, Dinah Shore Dr, Plumley Rd, Gerald Ford Dr, E Ramon Rd, San Luis Rey Dr, San Joaquin Dr, Clubhouse View Dr, Mount San Jacinto State Park, Azalea Creek, Black Mountain Trail, Highway 243, North Fork San Jacinto River, Stetson Ave, Hemet St, Cornell St, Girard St, E Newport Rd, Domenigoni Parkway, Leon Rd, Grand Ave, State Highway 74, California Ave, W Devonshire Ave, Warren Rd, Ramona Expressway, San Jacinto River, Highway 79, Oak Valley Parkway, Champions Dr, Union St, Brookside Ave.

The 41st and 39th are partitioned by Corona Freeway, River Trails Park, Redley Substation Rd, Arlington Ave, Alhambra Ave, Golden Ave, Doheny Blvd, Bolivar St, Campbell Ave, Pierce St, Quantico Dr, Collett Ave, Buchanan St, Highway 91, 12397 Doherty Way-Magnolia Ave, BNSF Railroad, N McKinley St, N Temescal St, E 16th St, S Neece St, Indiana Ave, Skyridge Dr, Fillmore St, 2969 Fillmore St-La Sierra Ave, Cleveland Ave, McAllister Parkway, Corsica Ave, Hermosa Dr, John F. Kennedy Dr, Wood Rd, Colt St, Dauchy Ave, Van Buren Blvd, Bobbit Ave, Chicago Ave, Krameria Ave, 16510 Sendero del Charro-Mariposa Ave, Barton St, Cole Ave, Rider St, Greenwood Ave, Kabian Park, Goetz Park, Ethanac Rd, McLaughlin Rd, Sherman Rd, Tumble Rd, Watson Rd, Escondido Expressway, Mapes Rd, Ellis Ave, Antelope Rd, Rico Ave, San Jacinto River, Ramona Expressway, Lake Perris State Recreation Area, Gilman Springs Rd, Moreno Valley Freeway, Quincy St, Cloud Haven Dr, Holly Ct, Reche Vista Dr, Reche Canyon Rd, and Keissel Rd.

The 41st and 48th are partitioned by Ortega Highway, Tenaja Truck Trail, NF-7506, Tenaja, San Mateo Creek, Los Alamos Rd, Und 233, S Main Dv, Wildomar, Grand Ave, Rancho Mirlo Dr, Copper Canyon Park, 42174 Kimberly Way-35817 Darcy Pl, Escondido Expressway, Scott Rd, 33477 Little Reb Pl-33516 Pittman Ln, Keller Rd, Menifee Rd, Clinton Keith Rd, Max Gilliss Blvd, Highway 79, Borel Rd, Lake Skinner, Warren Rd, Summitville St, Indian Knoll Rd, E Benton Rd, Rancho California Rd, Overhill Rd, Green Meadow Rd, Crossover Rd, Exa-Ely Rd, Denise Rd, Wiley Rd, Powerline Rd, Wilson Valley Rd, Wilson Creek, Reed Valley Rd, Centennial St, Beaver Ave, and Lake Vista Dr.

=== Cities and CDPs with 10,000 or more people ===
- Riverside – 317,261
- Corona – 157,136
- Menifee – 109,399
- Lake Elsinore – 71,898
- Eastvale – 69,757
- Palm Desert – 51,583
- Palm Springs – 44,575
- La Quinta – 41,748
- Wildomar – 37,214
- French Valley – 35,280
- Norco – 26,316
- Temescal Valley – 26,232
- Rancho Mirage – 17,633
- Woodcrest – 15,378
- El Sobrante – 14,039
- Lakeland Village – 12,364
- Canyon Lake - 11,142
- Calimesa – 10,026

=== 2,500 – 10,000 people ===
- Nuevo – 7,033
- Homeland – 6,772
- Cherry Valley – 6,509
- Nuevo – 6,447
- Lake Mathews – 5,972
- El Cerrito – 5,058
- Indian Wells – 4,757
- Idyllwild-Pine Cove – 4,163
- Sage – 3,370
- Anza – 3,075
- Idyllwild-Pine Cove – 2,963
- Green Acres – 2,918
- Coronita – 2,639

== Future composition ==
Beginning with the 2026 election, the 41st district will consist of the following counties:

- Los Angeles (part)
- Orange (part)

== List of members representing the district ==
Member	Party	Dates	Cong ress(es)	Electoral history	Counties
District created January 3, 1973
Lionel Van Deerlin (San Diego)	Democratic	January 3, 1973 – January 3, 1975	93rd	Redistricted from the 37th district and re-elected in 1972. Redistricted to the 42nd district.	1973–1975; San Diego (Southern City of San Diego)
Bob Wilson (San Diego)	Republican	January 3, 1975 – January 3, 1981	94th 95th 96th	Redistricted from the 40th district and re-elected in 1974. Re-elected in 1976. Re-elected in 1978. Retired.	1975–1983; San Diego (San Diego City Northern half)
Bill Lowery (San Diego)	Republican	January 3, 1981 – January 3, 1993	97th 98th 99th 100th 101st 102nd	Elected in 1980. Re-elected in 1982. Re-elected in 1984. Re-elected in 1986. Re-elected in 1988. Re-elected in 1990. Retired.	1975–1983; San Diego (San Diego City Northern half)
Bill Lowery (San Diego)	Republican	January 3, 1981 – January 3, 1993	97th 98th 99th 100th 101st 102nd	Elected in 1980. Re-elected in 1982. Re-elected in 1984. Re-elected in 1986. Re-elected in 1988. Re-elected in 1990. Retired.	1983–1993; San Diego (Northern suburbs)
Jay Kim (Diamond Bar)	Republican	January 3, 1993 – January 3, 1999	103rd 104th 105th	Elected in 1992. Re-elected in 1994. Re-elected in 1996. Lost renomination.	1993–2003; Southeastern Los Angeles, Northeastern Orange, Southwestern San Bernardino
Gary Miller (Diamond Bar)	Republican	January 3, 1999 – January 3, 2003	106th 107th	Elected in 1998. Re-elected in 2000. Redistricted to the 42nd district.	1993–2003; Southeastern Los Angeles, Northeastern Orange, Southwestern San Bernardino
Jerry Lewis (Redlands)	Republican	January 3, 2003 – January 3, 2013	108th 109th 110th 111th 112th	Redistricted from the 40th district and re-elected in 2002. Re-elected in 2004. Re-elected in 2006. Re-elected in 2008. Re-elected in 2010. Retired.	2003–2013 San Bernardino
Mark Takano (Riverside)	Democratic	January 3, 2013 – January 3, 2023	113th 114th 115th 116th 117th	Elected in 2012. Re-elected in 2014. Re-elected in 2016. Re-elected in 2018. Re-elected in 2020. Redistricted to the 39th district.	2013–2023 Inland Empire (Moreno Valley, Perris, and Riverside)
Ken Calvert (Corona)	Republican	January 3, 2023 – present	118th 119th	Redistricted from the 42nd district and re-elected in 2022. Re-elected in 2024. Redistricted to the 40th district.	2023–present Within Riverside County in the Inland Empire; Palm Springs, Corona, Menifee, Norco, Lake Elsinore, Wildomar, Rancho Mirage, Palm Desert, Indian Wells, La Quinta, Coachella Valley
Linda Sánchez (Whittier)	Democratic	Assuming office on January 3, 2027		Redistricted from the 38th district and re-elected in 2026.	2023–present Within Riverside County in the Inland Empire; Palm Springs, Corona, Menifee, Norco, Lake Elsinore, Wildomar, Rancho Mirage, Palm Desert, Indian Wells, La Quinta, Coachella Valley

== Election results ==
=== 1972 ===
1972 United States House of Representatives elections in California
Party	Candidate	Votes	%
Democratic	Lionel Van Deerlin (Incumbent)	115,634	74.1
Republican	D. Richard "Dick" Kau	40,514	25.9
Total votes		156,148	100.0
Democratic win (new seat)			

=== 1974 ===
1974 United States House of Representatives elections in California
Party	Candidate	Votes	%
Republican	Bob Wilson (Incumbent)	93,461	54.5
Democratic	Colleen Marie O'Connor	73,954	43.0
American Independent	Robert W. Franson	4,312	2.5
Total votes		171,727	100.0
Republican hold			

=== 1976 ===
1976 United States House of Representatives elections in California
Party	Candidate	Votes	%
Republican	Bob Wilson (Incumbent)	128,784	57.7
Democratic	King Golden, Jr.	94,590	42.3
Total votes		223,374	100.0
Republican hold			

=== 1978 ===
1978 United States House of Representatives elections in California
Party	Candidate	Votes	%
Republican	Bob Wilson (Incumbent)	107,685	58.1
Democratic	King Golden, Jr.	77,540	41.9
Total votes		185,225	100.0
Republican hold			

=== 1980 ===
1980 United States House of Representatives elections in California
Party	Candidate	Votes	%
Republican	Bill Lowery	123,187	52.7
Democratic	Bob Wilson	101,101	43.2
Libertarian	Joseph D. Alldredge	9,630	4.1
Total votes		233,918	100.0
Republican hold			

=== 1982 ===
1982 United States House of Representatives elections in California
Party	Candidate	Votes	%
Republican	Bill Lowery (Incumbent)	140,130	68.9
Democratic	Tony Brandenburg	58,677	28.8
Libertarian	Everett Hale	4,654	2.3
Total votes		203,461	100.0
Republican hold			

=== 1984 ===
1984 United States House of Representatives elections in California
Party	Candidate	Votes	%
Republican	Bill Lowery (Incumbent)	161,068	63.5
Democratic	Bob Simmons	85,475	33.7
Libertarian	Sara Baase	7,303	2.8
Total votes		253,846	100.0
Republican hold			

=== 1986 ===
1986 United States House of Representatives elections in California
Party	Candidate	Votes	%
Republican	Bill Lowery (Incumbent)	133,566	67.8
Democratic	Daniel F. "Dan" Kripke	59,816	30.4
Libertarian	Richard "Dick" Rider	3,541	1.8
Total votes		196,923	100.0
Republican hold			

=== 1988 ===
1988 United States House of Representatives elections in California
Party	Candidate	Votes	%
Republican	Bill Lowery (Incumbent)	187,380	64.8
Democratic	Daniel F. "Dan" Kripke	88,192	31.5
Libertarian	Richard "Dick" Rider	5,336	1.9
Peace and Freedom	C. T. Weber	4,853	1.8
Total votes		285,761	100.0
Republican hold			

=== 1990 ===
1990 United States House of Representatives elections in California
Party	Candidate	Votes	%
Republican	Bill Lowery (Incumbent)	105,723	49.2
Democratic	Daniel F. "Dan" Kripke	93,586	43.6
Peace and Freedom	Karen S.R. Works	15,428	7.2
Total votes		214,737	100.0
Republican hold			

=== 1992 ===
1992 United States House of Representatives elections in California
Party	Candidate	Votes	%
Republican	Jay Kim (Incumbent)	101,753	59.7
Democratic	Bob Baker	58,777	34.4
Peace and Freedom	James Michael "Mike" Noonan	10,136	5.9
Total votes		170,666	100.0
Republican hold			

=== 1994 ===
1994 United States House of Representatives elections in California
Party	Candidate	Votes	%
Republican	Jay Kim (Incumbent)	82,100	62.1
Democratic	Ed Tessier	50,043	37.9
Total votes		132,143	100.0
Republican hold			

=== 1996 ===
1996 United States House of Representatives elections in California
Party	Candidate	Votes	%
Republican	Jay Kim (Incumbent)	83,934	58.5
Democratic	Richard Waldron	47,346	33.0
Libertarian	Richard Newhouse	7,135	5.0
Natural Law	David Kramer	5,030	3.5
Republican	Marjorie Mikels (write-in)	120	0.0
Total votes		143,565	100.0
Republican hold			

=== 1998 ===
1998 United States House of Representatives elections in California
Party	Candidate	Votes	%
Republican	Gary Miller	68,310	53.2
Democratic	Eileen R. Ansari	52,264	40.7
Green	Cynthia Allaire	3,597	2.8
Libertarian	Kenneth E. Valentine	2,529	2.0
Natural Law	David F. Kramer	1,714	1.3
Total votes		128,414	100.0
Republican hold			

=== 2000 ===
2000 United States House of Representatives elections in California
Party	Candidate	Votes	%
Republican	Gary Miller (Incumbent)	104,695	59.0
Democratic	Rodolfo G. Favila	66,361	37.4
Natural Law	David Kramer	6,607	3.6
Total votes		177,616	100.0
Republican hold			

=== 2002 ===
2002 United States House of Representatives elections in California
Party	Candidate	Votes	%
Republican	Jerry Lewis (Incumbent)	91,326	67.4
Democratic	Keith A. Johnson	40,155	29.7
Libertarian	Kevin Craig	4,052	2.9
Total votes		135,533	100.0
Republican hold			

=== 2004 ===
2004 United States House of Representatives elections in California
Party	Candidate	Votes	%
Republican	Jerry Lewis (Incumbent)	181,605	83.0
Libertarian	Peymon Mottahedek	37,332	17.0
Total votes		218,937	100.0
Republican hold			

=== 2006 ===
2006 United States House of Representatives elections in California
Party	Candidate	Votes	%
Republican	Jerry Lewis (Incumbent)	109,761	67.0
Democratic	Louie A. Contreras	54,235	33.0
Independent	Carol Petersen (write-in)	48	0.0
Total votes		164,044	100.0
Republican hold			

=== 2008 ===
2008 United States House of Representatives elections in California
Party	Candidate	Votes	%
Republican	Jerry Lewis (Incumbent)	159,486	61.7
Democratic	Tim Prince	99,214	38.3
Total votes		258,700	100.0
Republican hold			

=== 2010 ===
2010 United States House of Representatives elections in California
Party	Candidate	Votes	%
Republican	Jerry Lewis (Incumbent)	127,857	63.3
Democratic	Pat Meagher	74,394	36.7
Total votes		202,251	100.0
Republican hold			

=== 2012 ===
2012 United States House of Representatives elections in California
Party	Candidate	Votes	%
Democratic	Mark Takano	103,578	59.0
Republican	John Tavaglione	72,074	41.0
Total votes		175,652	100.0
Democratic hold			

=== 2014 ===
2014 United States House of Representatives elections in California
Party	Candidate	Votes	%
Democratic	Mark Takano (Incumbent)	46,948	56.6
Republican	Steve Adams	35,936	43.4
Total votes		82,884	100.0
Democratic hold			

=== 2016 ===
2016 United States House of Representatives elections in California
Party	Candidate	Votes	%
Democratic	Mark Takano (Incumbent)	128,164	65.0
Republican	Doug Shepherd	69,159	35.0
Total votes		197,323	100.0
Democratic hold			

=== 2018 ===
2018 United States House of Representatives elections in California
Party	Candidate	Votes	%
Democratic	Mark Takano (Incumbent)	108,227	65.1
Republican	Aja Smith	58,021	34.9
Total votes		166,248	100.0
Democratic hold			

=== 2020 ===
2020 United States House of Representatives elections in California
Party	Candidate	Votes	%
Democratic	Mark Takano (Incumbent)	167,938	64.0
Republican	Aja Smith	94,289	36.0
Total votes		262,227	100.0
Democratic hold			

=== 2022 ===
2022 United States House of Representatives elections in California
Party	Candidate	Votes	%
Republican	Ken Calvert (Incumbent)	123,869	52.3
Democratic	Will Rollins	112,769	47.6
Total votes		236,638	100.0
Republican hold			

=== 2024 ===
California's 41st congressional district, 2024
Primary election
Party	Candidate	Votes	%
Republican	Ken Calvert (incumbent)	85,959	53.0
Democratic	Will Rollins	62,245	38.4
Democratic	Anna Nevenic	13,862	8.6
Total votes		162,066	100.0
General election
Republican	Ken Calvert (incumbent)	183,216	51.7
Democratic	Will Rollins	171,229	48.3
Total votes		354,445	100.0
Republican hold			

== Historical district boundaries ==
=== San Diego County ===
In the 1980s, the 41st congressional district was one of four that divided San Diego County, formerly located in the North County region. The district had been held for 12 years by Republican Bill Lowery and was considered the most Republican district in the San Diego area. The 41st district was renumbered as the California's 51st congressional district after the 1990 U.S. census in which it became the Inland Empire's 51st.

=== San Bernardino County ===
From 2003 to 2013, the district included large portions of the cavernous San Bernardino County and a small portion of Riverside County. The district formerly represented parts of the Inland Empire region, San Bernardino Mountains, and Mojave Desert, stretching from portions of the city of San Bernardino north to the Nevada border and east to the Colorado River. Redlands was the largest city in that district; other cities included: Loma Linda, Yucaipa, Victorville, Barstow, Hesperia, Highland, Big Bear Lake and Needles.

== See also ==
- List of United States congressional districts
- California's congressional districts
