= Coronita, California =

Coronita
- census-designated place
- Location of Coronita in Riverside County, California

- Position in California
- Coordinates: 33°52′33″N 117°36′41″W
- Country: United States
- State: California
- County: Riverside

Area
  - Total: 0.60 sq mi (1.56 km^{2})
  - Land: 0.60 sq mi (1.56 km^{2})
  - Water: 0 sq mi (0.00 km^{2}) 0%
- Elevation: 630 ft (190 m)

Population (2020)
  - Total: 2,639
  - Density: 4,382.5/sq mi (1,692.09/km^{2})
- Time zone: UTC-8 (Pacific (PST))
  - Summer (DST): UTC-7 (PDT)
- ZIP Code: 92882
- Area code: 951
- GNIS feature ID: 2582983

Coronita (Spanish for "Small crown") is a census-designated place in the Inland Empire region of Riverside County, California. Coronita sits at an elevation of 630 feet (190 m). The 2020 United States census reported Coronita's population was 2,639.

== Geography ==
According to the United States Census Bureau, the CDP covers an area of 0.6 square miles (1.6 km^{2}), all of it land. It is mostly surrounded by the Corona city limits.

== Demographics ==
Historical population
Census	Pop.	Note	%±
2010	2,608		—
2020	2,639		1.2%
U.S. Decennial Census; 1860–1870 1880-1890; 1900 1910 1920; 1930 1940 1950; 1960 1970 1980; 1990 2000 2010

Coronita first appeared as a census designated place in the 2010 U.S. census.

=== Racial and ethnic composition ===
Coronita CDP, California – Racial and ethnic composition Note: the US Census treats Hispanic/Latino as an ethnic category. This table excludes Latinos from the racial categories and assigns them to a separate category. Hispanics/Latinos may be of any race.
Race / Ethnicity (NH = Non-Hispanic)	Pop 2010	Pop 2020	% 2010	% 2020
White alone (NH)	1,035	837	39.69%	31.72%
Black or African American alone (NH)	38	29	1.46%	1.10%
Native American or Alaska Native alone (NH)	22	3	0.84%	0.11%
Asian alone (NH)	105	112	4.03%	4.24%
Native Hawaiian or Pacific Islander alone (NH)	8	6	0.31%	0.23%
Other race alone (NH)	10	10	0.38%	0.38%
Mixed race or Multiracial (NH)	41	52	1.57%	1.97%
Hispanic or Latino (any race)	1,349	1,590	51.73%	60.25%
Total	2,608	2,639	100.00%	100.00%

=== 2020 census ===
As of the 2020 census, Coronita had a population of 2,639 and a population density of 4,383.7 inhabitants per square mile (1,692.6/km^{2}). The census reported that 99.8% of the population lived in households, 0.2% lived in non-institutionalized group quarters, and no one was institutionalized. 100.0% of residents lived in urban areas, while 0.0% lived in rural areas.

The age distribution was 22.2% under the age of 18, 10.9% aged 18 to 24, 27.9% aged 25 to 44, 25.2% aged 45 to 64, and 13.8% who were 65 years of age or older. The median age was 36.5 years. For every 100 females there were 105.7 males, and for every 100 females age 18 and over there were 105.2 males age 18 and over.

There were 727 households, out of which 42.0% included children under the age of 18, 62.6% were married-couple households, 5.5% were cohabiting couple households, 17.3% had a female householder with no spouse or partner present, and 14.6% had a male householder with no spouse or partner present. 10.2% of households were one person, and 3.7% were one person aged 65 or older. The average household size was 3.62. There were 625 families (86.0% of all households).

There were 741 housing units, of which 1.9% were vacant. The homeowner vacancy rate was 0.7% and the rental vacancy rate was 1.5%. At an average density of 1,230.9 units per square mile (475.3 units/km^{2}), 727 units (98.1%) were occupied, of which 82.5% were owner-occupied and 17.5% were occupied by renters.

Racial composition as of the 2020 census
Race	Number	Percent
White	1,102	41.8%
Black or African American	35	1.3%
American Indian and Alaska Native	65	2.5%
Asian	120	4.5%
Native Hawaiian and Other Pacific Islander	7	0.3%
Some other race	848	32.1%
Two or more races	462	17.5%

=== Income and poverty ===
In 2023, the US Census Bureau estimated that the median household income was $106,815, and the per capita income was $35,521. About 0.6% of families and 1.8% of the population were below the poverty line.

== Government ==
Federal:

- In the United States House of Representatives, Coronita is in California's 41st congressional district, represented by Republican Ken Calvert.
- California is represented in the United States Senate by Democrats Laphonza Butler and Alex Padilla.

State:

- In the California State Legislature, Coronita is in the 31st senatorial district, represented by Democrat Sabrina Cervantes, and in the 58th Assembly district, represented by Republican Leticia Castillo.

Local:

- In the Riverside County Board of Supervisors, Coronita is in the Second District, represented by Karen Spiegel.

== Education ==
It is in the Corona-Norco Unified School District.
