= Bill Lowery (politician) =

American politician

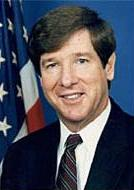

Member of the U.S. House of Representatives from California's 41st district
- In office January 3, 1981 – January 3, 1993
- Preceded by: Bob Wilson
- Succeeded by: Duke Cunningham (redistricted)

Personal details
- Born: William David Lowery; May 2, 1947 (age 79) San Diego, California, U.S.
- Party: Republican
- Education: San Diego State University

William David Lowery (born May 2, 1947) is an American politician and lobbyist from California. A Republican, he served six terms in the U.S. House of Representatives from 1981 to 1993.

== Prior to Election ==
Bill Lowery was born May 2, 1947, in San Diego, California. He attended San Diego State University. His father was a small businessman owning and operating a hardware store. His father died when Bill was nine years old, leaving Bill's mother to struggle to keep the family together. Bill was active in politics from the time he first attended college where he was involved in student politics on the conservative side, arranging peaceful demonstrations on behalf of free speech on campus for American corporations and the right for ROTC to recruit on campus, among other causes. He worked as National Youth Director for President Ford's campaign, and was a political operative for the California Republican Party.

== City Council ==
Lowery was elected to the San Diego City Council in 1977 at the age of 30. As a close ally of then Mayor Pete Wilson, Lowery supported development of the San Diego Trolley, the Gaslamp Quarter, and Horton Plaza. He also was particularly supportive of efforts on behalf of Mission Bay Park. He was elected by his colleagues to the post of Deputy Mayor in 1980.

== Congress ==
In 1980, Lowery was elected to Congress from California's 41st congressional district, which included most of San Diego, after 28-year incumbent Bob Wilson retired. Lowery, who started the campaign 27 points behind his opponent but finished 10 points ahead, proved to be very popular as congressman. He was reelected four times with little difficulty. In his last campaign in 1990 he was reelected over his Democratic opponent with only 49% of the vote.

Lowery focused his efforts in Congress on improving San Diego. He was a major opponent of off-shore oil drilling, a major supporter of the reclamation of waste water and the Otay Mesa border crossing.

=== Controversy ===
Although there was no finding of wrongdoing by any government agency of Lowery's activities, he received substantial bad press in connection with the House banking scandal, and yet again, from his friendship with Don Dixon, a major player in the Savings and Loan scandal.

In the redistricting after the 1990 census, Lowery was moved into the district of a fellow Republican, Duke Cunningham. Lowery was defeated in the primary, obtaining just 15.3 percent of the vote, and coming in third place. Cunningham won the primary and was elected, and ultimately became the center of a multimillion-dollar bribery scandal a decade later and was forced to resign after pleading guilty to bribery in 2005.

== Lobbyist ==
Since leaving Congress, Lowery has worked as a lobbyist in Washington, D.C. He specializes in adding "earmarks" into appropriation bills for his clients. Lowery had been particularly effective in lobbying his friend, ex-Representative Jerry Lewis. Lowery, his firm, and clients have donated 37% of Lewis' $1.3 million PAC income for the period 1999–2005.

Lowery owns two homes, a townhouse on Capitol Hill, and a 14-acre (0.06 km^{2}) waterfront property in King William County, Virginia.

== Electoral history ==
1980 United States House of Representatives elections in California
| Party | Candidate | Votes | % |
|---|---|---|---|
| Republican | Bill Lowery | 123,187 | 52.7 |
| Democratic | Bob Wilson | 101,101 | 43.2 |
| Libertarian | Joseph D. Alldredge | 9,630 | 4.1 |
| Total votes | | 233,918 | 100.0 |
| Republican hold | | | |

1982 United States House of Representatives elections in California
| Party | Candidate | Votes | % |
|---|---|---|---|
| Republican | Bill Lowery (Incumbent) | 140,130 | 68.9 |
| Democratic | Tony Brandenburg | 58,677 | 28.8 |
| Libertarian | Everett Hale | 4,654 | 2.3 |
| Total votes | | 203,461 | 100.0 |
| Republican hold | | | |

1984 United States House of Representatives elections in California
| Party | Candidate | Votes | % |
|---|---|---|---|
| Republican | Bill Lowery (Incumbent) | 161,068 | 63.5 |
| Democratic | Bob Simmons | 85,475 | 33.7 |
| Libertarian | Sara Baase | 7,303 | 2.8 |
| Total votes | | 253,846 | 100.0 |
| Republican hold | | | |

1986 United States House of Representatives elections in California
| Party | Candidate | Votes | % |
|---|---|---|---|
| Republican | Bill Lowery (Incumbent) | 133,566 | 67.8 |
| Democratic | Daniel F. "Dan" Kripke | 59,816 | 30.4 |
| Libertarian | Richard "Dick" Rider | 3,541 | 1.8 |
| Total votes | | 196,923 | 100.0 |
| Republican hold | | | |

1988 United States House of Representatives elections in California
| Party | Candidate | Votes | % |
|---|---|---|---|
| Republican | Bill Lowery (Incumbent) | 187,380 | 64.8 |
| Democratic | Daniel F. "Dan" Kripke | 88,192 | 31.5 |
| Libertarian | Richard "Dick" Rider | 5,336 | 1.9 |
| Peace and Freedom | C. T. Weber | 4,853 | 1.8 |
| Total votes | | 285,761 | 100.0 |
| Republican hold | | | |

1990 United States House of Representatives elections in California
| Party | Candidate | Votes | % |
|---|---|---|---|
| Republican | Bill Lowery (Incumbent) | 105,723 | 49.2 |
| Democratic | Daniel F. "Dan" Kripke | 93,586 | 43.6 |
| Peace and Freedom | Karen S.R. Works | 15,428 | 7.2 |
| Total votes | | 214,737 | 100.0 |
| Republican hold | | | |

U.S. House of Representatives
| Preceded by Bob Wilson | Member of the U.S. House of Representatives from California's 41st congressional district 1981–1993 | Succeeded by Jay Kim |
U.S. order of precedence (ceremonial)
| Preceded by Chip Pashayan as Former U.S. Representative | Order of precedence of the United States as Former U.S. Representative | Succeeded by Brian Bilbray as Former U.S. Representative |
