= Lake Mathews, California =

Lake Mathews
- census-designated place
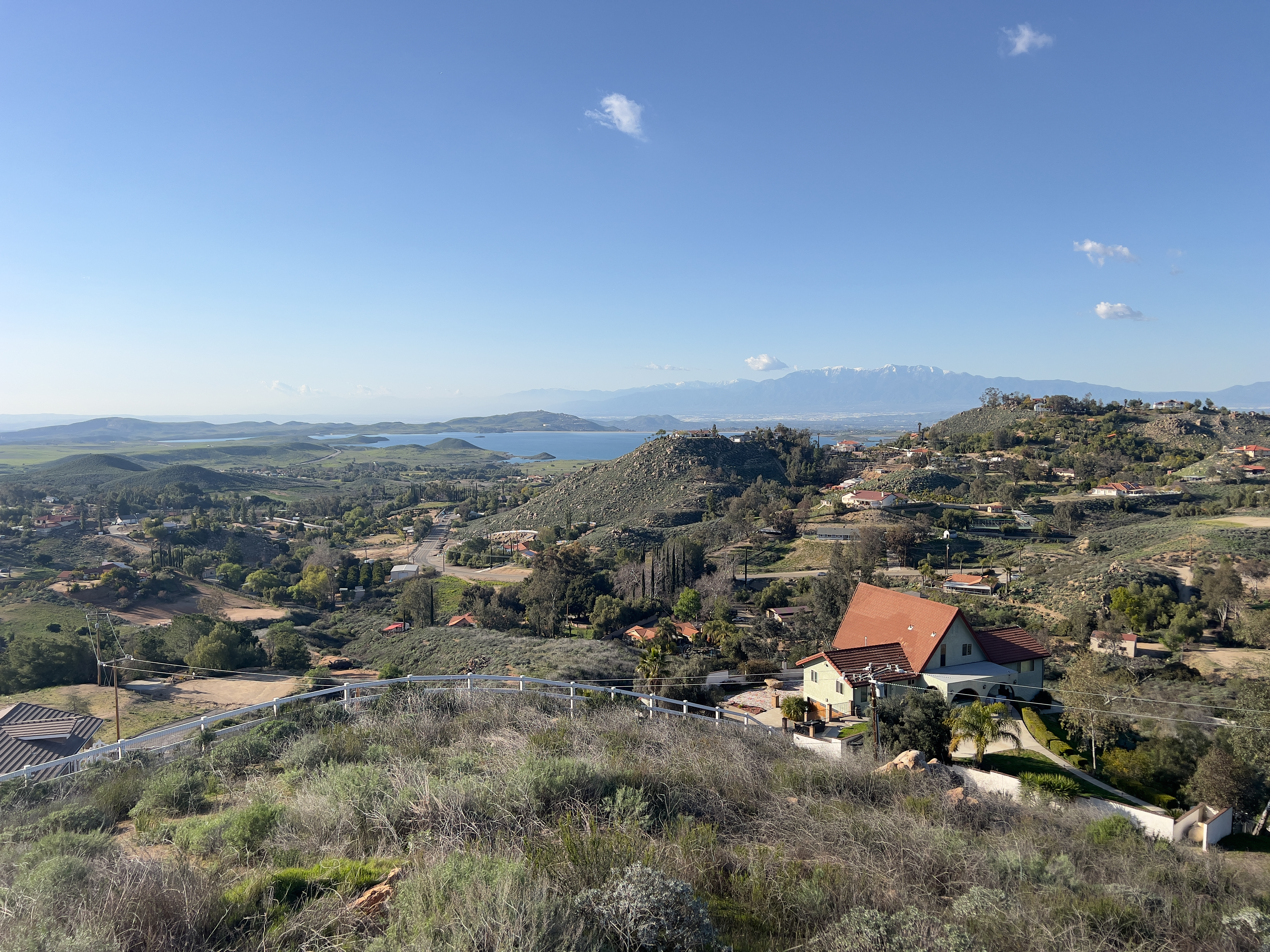
- View of Lake Mathews community, Lake Mathews reservoir, and San Gabriel Mountains

- Location of Lake Mathews in Riverside County, California.

- Position in California.
- Coordinates: 33°49′30″N 117°22′06″W
- Country: United States
- State: California
- County: Riverside

Area
  - Total: 15.927 sq mi (41.252 km^{2})
  - Land: 15.927 sq mi (41.252 km^{2})
  - Water: 0 sq mi (0 km^{2}) 0%
- Elevation: 1,775 ft (541 m)

Population (2020)
  - Total: 5,972
  - Density: 374.9/sq mi (144.8/km^{2})
- Time zone: UTC-8 (Pacific (PST))
  - Summer (DST): UTC-7 (PDT)
- GNIS feature ID: 2583051

Lake Mathews is a census-designated place in the Inland Empire region of Riverside County, California. Lake Mathews sits at an elevation of 1,775 feet (541 m). The 2020 United States census reported Lake Mathews's population was 5,972.

== Geography ==
According to the United States Census Bureau, the CDP covers an area of 15.9 square miles (41.3 km^{2}), all of it land. Woodcrest and the Lake Mathews reservoir are located to the north, and Mead Valley is located to the east. It is situated on the north end of the Temescal Mountains.

== Demographics ==
Historical population
Census	Pop.	Note	%±
2010	5,890		—
2020	5,972		1.4%
U.S. Decennial Census; 1860–1870 1880-1890; 1900 1910 1920; 1930 1940 1950; 1960 1970 1980; 1990 2000 2010

Lake Mathews first appeared as a census designated place in the 2010 U.S. census.

=== Racial and ethnic composition ===
Lake Mathews CDP, California – Racial and ethnic composition Note: the US Census treats Hispanic/Latino as an ethnic category. This table excludes Latinos from the racial categories and assigns them to a separate category. Hispanics/Latinos may be of any race.
Race / Ethnicity (NH = Non-Hispanic)	Pop 2010	Pop 2020	% 2010	% 2020
White alone (NH)	3,469	2,858	58.90%	47.86%
Black or African American alone (NH)	241	188	4.09%	3.15%
Native American or Alaska Native alone (NH)	34	33	0.58%	0.55%
Asian alone (NH)	187	257	3.17%	4.30%
Native Hawaiian or Pacific Islander alone (NH)	3	8	0.05%	0.13%
Other race alone (NH)	9	20	0.15%	0.33%
Mixed race or Multiracial (NH)	139	214	2.36%	3.58%
Hispanic or Latino (any race)	1,808	2,394	30.70%	40.09%
Total	5,890	5,972	100.00%	100.00%

=== 2020 census ===
As of the 2020 census, Lake Mathews had a population of 5,972. The population density was 375.0 inhabitants per square mile (144.8/km^{2}).

The median age was 41.6 years. The age distribution was 21.3% under the age of 18, 8.5% aged 18 to 24, 23.9% aged 25 to 44, 27.7% aged 45 to 64, and 18.6% who were 65 years of age or older. For every 100 females, there were 103.1 males, and for every 100 females age 18 and over there were 101.9 males age 18 and over.

The census reported that 99.9% of the population lived in households, 6 people (0.1%) lived in non-institutionalized group quarters, and no one was institutionalized. 37.7% of residents lived in urban areas, while 62.3% lived in rural areas.

There were 1,880 households, out of which 31.0% had children under the age of 18 living in them. Of all households, 61.3% were married-couple households, 4.1% were cohabiting-couple households, 15.6% were households with a male householder and no spouse or partner present, and 19.0% were households with a female householder and no spouse or partner present. About 16.2% of all households were made up of individuals and 7.7% had someone living alone who was 65 years of age or older. The average household size was 3.17. There were 1,498 families (79.7% of all households).

There were 1,955 housing units, of which 1,880 (96.2%) were occupied and 3.8% were vacant. Of occupied units, 85.1% were owner-occupied and 14.9% were occupied by renters. The homeowner vacancy rate was 0.2% and the rental vacancy rate was 5.4%.

Racial composition as of the 2020 census
Race	Number	Percent
White	3,274	54.8%
Black or African American	203	3.4%
American Indian and Alaska Native	97	1.6%
Asian	259	4.3%
Native Hawaiian and Other Pacific Islander	13	0.2%
Some other race	1,176	19.7%
Two or more races	950	15.9%

=== Demographic estimates ===
In 2023, the US Census Bureau estimated that 21.0% of the population were foreign-born. Of all people aged 5 or older, 63.7% spoke only English at home, 34.5% spoke Spanish, 0.6% spoke other Indo-European languages, 1.0% spoke Asian or Pacific Islander languages, and 0.2% spoke other languages. Of those aged 25 or older, 79.8% were high school graduates and 24.6% had a bachelor's degree.

=== Income and poverty ===
The median household income in 2023 was $102,700, and the per capita income was $34,329. About 5.9% of families and 7.4% of the population were below the poverty line.

== Education ==
It is divided between Val Verde Unified School District, Riverside Unified School District, and Corona-Norco Unified School District.
