= Foothills Academy =

Foothills Academy may refer to:

- Foothills Academy (Alberta), in Calgary, Alberta, Canada
- Foothills Academy (Arizona), in Scottsdale, Arizona
- Foothills Academy (Colorado), in Wheat Ridge, Colorado
- Foothills Academy (Kentucky), in Albany, Kentucky
