= Jay Kim =

Korean-American politician (born 1939)

- 김창준
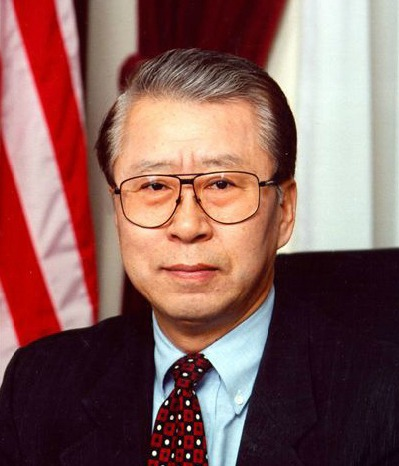

Member of the U.S. House of Representatives from California's 41st district
- In office January 3, 1993 – January 3, 1999
- Preceded by: Bill Lowery
- Succeeded by: Gary Miller

Personal details
- Born: Kim Chang-joon; March 27, 1939 (age 87) Keijō, Japanese Korea (now South Korea)
- Party: Republican
- Spouse(s): June Kim (divorced) Jennifer Ahn
- Education: University of Southern California (BS, MS); Hanyang University (PhD)

Korean name
- Hangul: 김창준
- Hanja: 金昌準
- RR: Gim Changjun
- MR: Kim Ch'angjun

Jay Chang Joon Kim (Korean: 김창준; born March 27, 1939) is a Korean-American politician and former member of the U.S. House of Representatives from California. He was the first Korean American to be elected to the United States Congress.

== Early life, education, and business career ==
Jay Kim was born in 1939 in Keijō, Korea, Empire of Japan (now Seoul, South Korea). His Korean name, Kim Chang Joon, roughly translates to "golden splendid law." During the Korean War, his home was destroyed. He immigrated to the United States in 1961. After attending a community college, Kim transferred to the University of Southern California, where he earned bachelor's and master's degrees in civil engineering. He later earned a doctorate in political science from Hanyang University.

In 1976, Kim started JAYKIM Engineers, a firm that specializes in designing highways and water reclamation projects. He built the business into a firm of 130 employees, with offices in three western states. Kim is an engineer, registered in five western states. JAYKIM Engineers was recognized as one of the top 500 design firms in the country.

== Political career ==
=== Local politics ===
Kim was elected to the city council of Diamond Bar, a newly incorporated suburb of Los Angeles, in 1990 and was elected mayor the following year.

=== U.S. House of Representatives (1993–1999) ===
Kim was elected to the House of Representatives in 1992 as a Republican from the newly created 41st District, making him the first Korean American elected to the United States Congress.

Kim came under scrutiny for campaign donations, eventually pleading guilty to accepting $230,000 in illegal donations, which amounted to one-third of all donations to his 1992 campaign. At the time, it was a record for campaign violations.

In 1998, he lost the primary election to Gary Miller, with whom he had once served on the Diamond Bar City Council. Miller also won the general election and held the seat until he was elected to the 31st Congressional District in 2012. Kim sought to win election in the 42nd District in 2000. He was defeated in the primary by Elia Pirozzi, who in turn was defeated by incumbent Joe Baca.

== Recent activities ==
In recent years, Kim has focused on improving relations and business opportunities between the U.S. and South Korea. He has served as chairman of The Washington Korean-American Forum think tank since 2007. As chairman of Kim Changjoon US-Korea Foundation, he uses his political and professional experience to help develop political leadership in South Korea. The Kim Changjoon Politics and Economy Academy in Korea educates and encourages small business owners to go abroad by providing global market skills and professional knowledge.

With the election of President Park Geun-hye in 2013, Kim was appointed to the National Economic Advisory Council to help small business seek opportunities in the global market. Kim has stated that his "position in both the United States and Korea allows me to encourage economic development between our nations, and the new free-trade agreement lets companies… flourish in new markets." However, Park was also convicted on public corruption and influence peddling charges, and on 6 April 2018, Park was sentenced to 24 years in prison in South Korea.

Kim also regularly contributes articles to The Korea Times, JoongAng Ilbo, and The Korea Economic Daily, and is the honorary Ambassador of Gyeonggi Province.

2021 PyeongChang Peace Forum

The "2021 PyeongChang Peace Forum" took from February 7 to the 10th at the Alpensia Convention Center in Pyeongchang, Gangwon Province. On the morning of February 6, one day ahead of the Peace Forum's opening ceremony, it had the first Korea-U.S. Leaders Peace Strategy Dialogue session.

This 1st Korea-U.S. Leaders Peace Dialogue was organized by the Jay Kim Foundation with Gangwon-do, and it was chaired by Professor Kim Woo-sang of Yonsei University. Members of the National Assembly, including Ahn Min-Suk, Lee Sang-min, Hong Young-Pyo from the Majority Party, and Lee Myung-Soo from the People Power Party, participated as a panel. From the U.S. side, the former U.S. Congressman Jay Kim attended the event, and former U.S. Congresswoman Loretta Sanchez and former Congressman Bart Gordon from the Democratic Party attended virtually.

Korean-American Republican Congresswoman Young Kim and Congressman Ami Bera, a Member of the East Asia Pacific subcommittee of the Foreign Affairs Committee, were unable to attend the forum virtually due to a busy schedule, so instead they sent a video clip of congratulatory remarks hoping for the success of the 1st Peace Forum.

A total of six members of the Korea National Assembly and the United States Congress attended the forum to discuss the current status and importance of the South Korea-U.S. alliance, as well as the denuclearization of the Korean Peninsula and the importance of the peace exchange with North Korea through sports. Each of them gave five-minute presentations on the topic and discussed various solutions and methods in-depth. This event, which will be held every year as part of the PyeongChang Peace Forum, will be expected to contribute to the South Korea-U.S. alliance and a successful Korean Peninsula peace process.

Interview with Gangwon Ilbo on February 7

On the 6th of February, right before the 2021 PyeongChang Peace Forum was held, both former and current Party Members from Korea and the United States gathered at the Alpensia in Pyeongchang, Gangwon Province to discuss peace strategies for the Korean Peninsula. This meeting was organized by former US Congressman Jay Kim. Although he was born and raised in Seoul, Kim has a special attachment to Gangwon-do and was appointed as the Honorary Governor of Gangwon-do in 2016. On the 7th of February, at the start of the 2021 Pyeongchang Peace Forum, Gangwon Ilbo (Gangwon-do's No.1 newspaper) interviewed Kim while he was spending all his efforts for discussing possible measures for peace for the Korean peninsula. During the interview with Gang Won Ilbo, Kim presented his idea that Gangwon Winter Youth Olympics' stimulation would support the Inter-Korean Exchange Plans. He also presented that North Korea's current economic difficulties make for a golden time for US-North Korea dialogue, and the U.S. Strategic Perseverance Policy will bring about North Korean Ballistic Missile Provocation. Kim stated, "Peace is not made with words, but made with strength, through consistent efforts for strengthening the alliance between Korea-U.S."

Article on LA JoongAng Daily Newspaper on February 12

This New Year's Eve (Lunar New Year, 2021), former Congressman Jay Kim donated to a charity run by Happy Village (an NGO operated by LA's JoongAng Daily newspaper) to serve hot rice cake soups to 300 older people living alone in Los Angeles, California.

== Professional and political affiliations ==
- 2019.03 – Chair of the former US Members (FMC) of the delegation to Korea
- 2019.11 – Honorary Ambassador, Catholic Hospital of Yeoido
- 2016.06 – Honorary Governor, Kangwon Province (Place of PyeongChang Winter Olympic)
- 2016.03 – Honorary Citizen, Osan, Gyeonggi Province
- 2015.08 – Honorary Ambassador, Suhyup (National Federation of Fisheries Cooperatives)
- 2015.06 – Foreign investment Advisor, Gangwon Province
- 2015.04 – Board Member, US Korea Institute of Johns Hopkins University
- 2013.05 – National Economic Advisory Council, the Office of the President of Korea (President GH Park)
- 2012.06 – Chairman, KimChangJoon Academy
- 2011.07 – Chairman, KimChangJoon Future US-Korea Foundation
- 2009.09 – Honorary Ambassador, Gyeonggi Province
- 2009.09 – Goodwill Ambassador, Soonchunhyang University Hospital
- 2008.10 – International Advisor, Incheon International City
- 2008.05 – Honorary Citizen of Jeju Province & City of Osan
- 2008.01 – Chairman, Washington Korean-American Forum
- 1995.08 – Honorary Citizen of Seoul

== Electoral history ==
1992 United States House of Representatives elections in California
Party	Candidate	Votes	%
Republican	Jay Kim (Incumbent)	101,753	59.7
Democratic	Bob Baker	58,777	34.4
Peace and Freedom	James Michael "Mike" Noonan	10,136	5.9
Total votes		170,666	100.0
Republican hold			

1994 United States House of Representatives elections in California
Party	Candidate	Votes	%
Republican	Jay Kim (Incumbent)	82,100	62.1
Democratic	Ed Tessier	50,043	37.9
Total votes		132,143	100.0
Republican hold			

1996 United States House of Representatives elections in California
Party	Candidate	Votes	%
Republican	Jay Kim (Incumbent)	83,934	58.5
Democratic	Richard Waldron	47,346	33.0
Libertarian	Richard Newhouse	7,135	5.0
Natural Law	David Kramer	5,030	3.5
Republican	Marjorie Mikels (write-in)	120	0.0
Total votes		143,565	100.0
Republican hold			

== Publications ==
- 1994.08 I am a Conservative, 1994 by Sung Moon Publishing Company
- 1999.11 Politics in Korea & in U.S.A, 1999 by Kyo Moon Sa Publishing Company
- 2010.03 Go ahead Shake Me, I'll never Give Up My Hope, 2010 by Ok Dang Publishing Company
- 2016.10 Be Ready for Next President Trump, 2016 by Raon Book Publishing Company

== Columns and commentaries ==
- Jay Kim's Untold Story of U.S. Politics (Hankook-Ilbo), 2008–2010
- Jay Kim Column in Korea Daily U.S. Edition (Jung Ang-Ilbo), bi-weekly, 2009–present
- Jay Kim Desk on WKTV in Washington DC, bi-weekly, 2008–2016
- Jay Kim's Korean Politics and U.S. Politics in The Korea Economic Daily, bi-weekly, 2009–present
- Jay Kim Column in The Korea Times, English edition, bi-weekly, 2010–2016
- Jay Kim's Congressional Memoir in The Korea Times, English edition, weekly, 2010–2011

== Awards ==
- The President's Medal and Award from South Korea, 2012
- The Political Leadership Award, Korean American Political Leadership Conference, 2012
- 1993 Recipient of the Ellis Island Medal of Honor Award
- US Department of Commerce: Sprit of Enterprise
- Citizens Against Government Waste: Award for Taxpayer Hero
- Watchdogs of the Treasury: Award for Golden Bulldog
- The Free Congress Foundation: Award for Sound Dollar
- The National Federation of Independent Business: Guardian of Small Business
- The League of Private Property Voters: Champion of Property Right
- The 60 Plus Association: Guardian of Seniors Rights
- The National Wholesale Grocers and International Food Service Distributors Association : Award for the Thomas Jefferson
- The National Security Caucus: Award for the National Security Leadership
- 1993 Recipient of the Ellis Island Medal of Honor Award
- Award for National Excellence in Civil Engineering
- Award for Outstanding achievement in Business Community
- Engineer of the Year Award
- Outstanding Legislative Leadership Award of the 103rd Congress
- Outstanding Leadership Award from NAPAW

== See also ==
- List of Asian Americans and Pacific Islands Americans in the United States Congress
- List of American federal politicians convicted of crimes
- List of federal political scandals in the United States

U.S. House of Representatives
Preceded by Bill Lowery	Member of the House of Representatives from California's 41st congressional district 1993–1999	Succeeded by Gary Miller
U.S. order of precedence (ceremonial)
Preceded by Yvonne Brathwaite Burke as Former U.S. Representative	Order of precedence of the United States as Former U.S. Representative	Succeeded by Doug Ose as Former U.S. Representative
