= Woodcrest, California =

Woodcrest
- census-designated place
- Interactive map of Woodcrest
- Location in the United States
- Coordinates: 33°52′56″N 117°21′26″W
- Country: United States
- State: California
- County: Riverside

Area
  - Total: 11.375 sq mi (29.461 km^{2})
  - Land: 11.375 sq mi (29.461 km^{2})
  - Water: 0 sq mi (0 km^{2}) 0%
- Elevation: 1,535 ft (468 m)

Population (2020)
  - Total: 15,378
  - Density: 1,351.9/sq mi (521.98/km^{2})
- Time zone: UTC-8 (PST)
  - Summer (DST): UTC-7 (PDT)
- ZIP codes: 92504, 92508
- Area code: 951
- FIPS code: 06-86244
- GNIS feature ID: 1652815

Woodcrest is a census-designated place (CDP) in the Inland Empire region of Riverside County, California, United States. The population was 15,378 at the 2020 census, up from 14,347 at the 2010 census. The adjacent city of Riverside lists Woodcrest as an area for potential annexation.

== History ==
The Woodcrest area was initially populated by dry land grain farmers in the late 19th century. In 1894, the population had grown enough for the Riverside County Board of Supervisors to establish a school in the area, and on February 6 of that year they authorized the Oak Glen School District.

In 1905 the first subdivision, the Oak Glen Tract, was created. The House Heights tract was formed in April 1924, and in May the Fertile Acres tract was created near the current Washington Street and Van Buren intersection. In February 1926, the first of five subdivisions with the name Woodcrest Acres was formed, and the name “Woodcrest” was subsequently given to the post office that was established later that year. Although the post office was closed in 1936, the Woodcrest name continued to be used to refer to the area from then on.

Water in the Woodcrest area became more affordable after the voters of Riverside, Corona, Lake Elsinore and surrounding unincorporated areas approved the formation of the Western Municipal Water District in 1955. Landowners began diversifying agriculture in the area. Although citrus groves within Riverside city limits were on the decline, groves in the Woodcrest area began to expand.

Beginning in the 1980s, population pressures and the availability of cheaper land resulted in the decline of agriculture in the Woodcrest area. Today, most orange groves in Woodcrest have given way to development. The citrus industry that was the foundation of Riverside and surrounding communities has nearly disappeared.

=== Etymology ===
"Wood" was the name, or part of the name, of several prominent property owners in the area, and the word was combined with "crest" because the original Woodcrest Acres tract was at the crest of the hills in the area. Susan Wood owned property around the current Wood Road, and is the person for whom the road was named in 1916. John C. Woodard owned 160 acres (0.65 km^{2}) off of current day Washington Street. For many years, one of the main routes from Riverside out to Woodcrest was referred to as Woodard Grade, or sometimes Woodward Grade, but the name was later lost when the county realigned the route with current day Washington Street. Additionally, two real estate promoters in the area were named Marie and Charles Wood.

== Geography ==
Woodcrest is located at 33°53′0″N 117°21′50″W (33.883366, -117.363825). Certain locations of Woodcrest reach higher than 2,000 feet (610 m) above sea level.

According to the United States Census Bureau, the CDP has a total area of 11.4 square miles (30 km^{2}), all of it land.

Woodcrest is also an equestrian community with many of its residences owning ranches and horses. However, many new housing developments are being built in Woodcrest due to the increasing population of Riverside.

== Demographics ==
Historical population
Census	Pop.	Note	%±
1990	7,796		—
2000	8,342		7.0%
2010	14,347		72.0%
2020	15,378		7.2%
U.S. Decennial Census; 1860–1870 1880-1890; 1900 1910 1920; 1930 1940 1950; 1960 1970 1980; 1990 2000 2010

Woodcrest first appeared as a census designated place in the 1990 U.S. census.

=== Racial and ethnic composition ===
Woodcrest CDP, California – Racial and ethnic composition Note: the US Census treats Hispanic/Latino as an ethnic category. This table excludes Latinos from the racial categories and assigns them to a separate category. Hispanics/Latinos may be of any race.
Race / Ethnicity (NH = Non-Hispanic)	Pop 2000	Pop 2010	Pop 2020	% 2000	% 2010	% 2020
White alone (NH)	5,999	8,380	7,158	71.91%	58.41%	46.55%
Black or African American alone (NH)	378	687	757	4.53%	4.79%	4.92%
Native American or Alaska Native alone (NH)	53	39	52	0.64%	0.27%	0.34%
Asian alone (NH)	283	697	975	3.39%	4.86%	6.34%
Native Hawaiian or Pacific Islander alone (NH)	20	35	36	0.24%	0.24%	0.23%
Other race alone (NH)	14	21	92	0.17%	0.15%	0.60%
Mixed race or Multiracial (NH)	205	375	628	2.46%	2.61%	4.08%
Hispanic or Latino (any race)	1,390	4,113	5,680	16.66%	28.67%	36.94%
Total	8,342	14,347	15,378	100.00%	100.00%	100.00%

=== 2020 census ===
As of the 2020 census, Woodcrest had a population of 15,378. The population density was 1,351.9 inhabitants per square mile (522.0/km^{2}). The median age was 42.1 years. 21.8% of residents were under the age of 18 and 17.9% were 65 years of age or older. For every 100 females, there were 100.2 males, and for every 100 females age 18 and over, there were 97.2 males age 18 and over.

The census reported that 99.3% of the population lived in households, 0.7% lived in non-institutionalized group quarters, and no one was institutionalized. In addition, 99.3% of residents lived in urban areas, while 0.7% lived in rural areas.

There were 4,648 households, of which 34.8% had children under the age of 18. Of all households, 64.3% were married-couple households, 4.4% were cohabiting couple households, 13.1% had a male householder with no spouse or partner present, and 18.2% had a female householder with no spouse or partner present. About 12.6% of households were one person, and 7.3% had someone living alone who was 65 years of age or older. The average household size was 3.28. There were 3,894 families (83.8% of all households).

There were 4,767 housing units at an average density of 419.1 units per square mile (161.8 units/km^{2}). Of these, 2.5% were vacant and 4,648 (97.5%) were occupied. Among occupied units, 89.1% were owner-occupied and 10.9% were renter-occupied. The homeowner vacancy rate was 0.7%, and the rental vacancy rate was 3.8%.

Racial composition as of the 2020 census
Race	Number	Percent
White	8,207	53.4%
Black or African American	803	5.2%
American Indian and Alaska Native	185	1.2%
Asian	1,014	6.6%
Native Hawaiian and Other Pacific Islander	51	0.3%
Some other race	2,607	17.0%
Two or more races	2,511	16.3%

=== 2023 estimates ===
In 2023, the US Census Bureau estimated that 13.4% of the population were foreign-born. Of all people aged 5 or older, 69.5% spoke only English at home, 24.5% spoke Spanish, 1.4% spoke other Indo-European languages, 3.9% spoke Asian or Pacific Islander languages, and 0.7% spoke other languages. Of those aged 25 or older, 92.3% were high school graduates and 30.0% had a bachelor's degree.

The median household income was $139,659, and the per capita income was $49,085. About 5.1% of families and 7.1% of the population were below the poverty line.

== Government ==
In the California State Legislature, Woodcrest is in the 32nd senatorial district, represented by Republican Kelly Seyarto, and in the 63rd Assembly district, represented by Republican Natasha Johnson.

In the United States House of Representatives, Woodcrest is in California's 41st congressional district, represented by Republican Ken Calvert.

== Education ==
Most of Woodcrest is in Riverside Unified School District while a portion is in Val Verde Unified School District.
