= Foothill Farm =

Historic house in New Hampshire, United States

- U.S. National Register of Historic Places
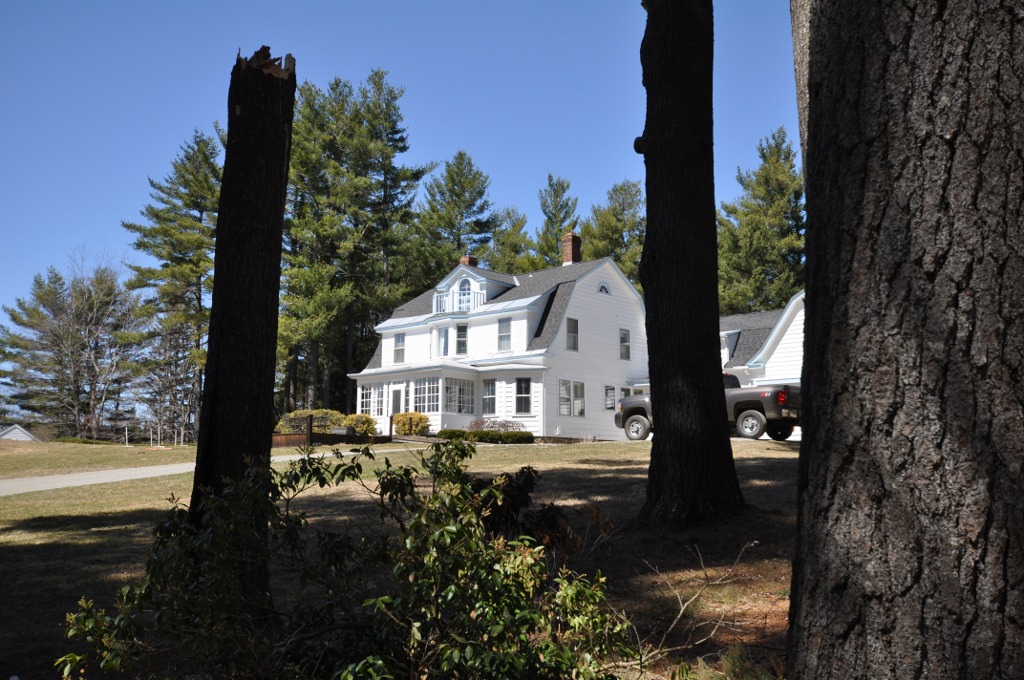

- Location within New Hampshire Location within the United States
- Location: Old Troy Rd., Dublin, New Hampshire
- Coordinates: 42°53′47″N 72°6′16″W
- Area: 1 acre (0.40 ha)
- Built: 1914
- Architect: Lavalle, John
- Architectural style: Colonial Revival
- MPS: Dublin MRA
- NRHP reference No.: 83004025
- Added to NRHP: December 15, 1983

Foothill Farm is a historic farmhouse on Old Troy Road in Dublin, New Hampshire, United States. Built about 1914 as part of the large Amory summer estate, it is a distinctive local example of Dutch Colonial Revival architecture. The house was listed on the National Register of Historic Places in 1983.

== Description and history ==
The Foothill Farm is located in a rural setting southwest of Dublin Pond and north of Mount Monadnock, on the west side of Old Troy Road a short way south of Old Marlborough Road. It is a 2 1/2-story wood-frame structure, with a gambrel roof in the Dutch Colonial style, and a sloping shed-roofed dormer on the front facade, topped by a smaller gable roof dormer with balcony. The house is attached by a 1 1/2-story gambrel roofed ell to a similarly styled barn.

The house was built c. 1914 for Mrs. William Amory as a replacement for an older farmhouse, whose foundation stands nearby. It was probably designed by John Lavalle, who also designed the Amory House that served as the seat of the Amory family's country estate in the early 1900s. The estate extended up the northern flanks of Mount Monadnock between Pumpelly Ridge and Old Troy Road. This property was sold out of that estate in the 1930s.

== See also ==
- National Register of Historic Places listings in Cheshire County, New Hampshire
