= Foothills Academy (Colorado) =

Coordinates: 39.783311°N 105.115350°W

Location
- 4725 Miller Street; Wheat Ridge, Jefferson County, Colorado 80033; United States

Information
- Founder: Mary Lou Faddick
- Head of school: Charlie Szumilas
- Grades: Pre-Kindergarten through 12th grade
- Colors: Silver and Teal
- Mascot: Dragon
- Accreditation: Association of Colorado Independent Schools
- Website: http://www.foothills-academy.org

Foothill Academy was a private school in Wheat Ridge, Colorado. It offers pre-kindergarten through Grade 12. The school was founded in 1984. The school's campus was bought in 2010 by Mountain Phoenix Community School.
