= Foothills Mall =

Foothills Mall refers to multiple shopping centers in the United States of America:

- Foothills Mall (Arizona), near Tucson, Arizona
- Foothills Mall (Tennessee), in Maryville, Tennessee
- The Shops at Foothills, formerly known as Foothills Mall and Foothills Fashion Mall, in Fort Collins, Colorado
