= Foothill Malls =

Traffic medians in Queens, New York

Coordinates: 40°42′55.12″N 73°46′5.95″W

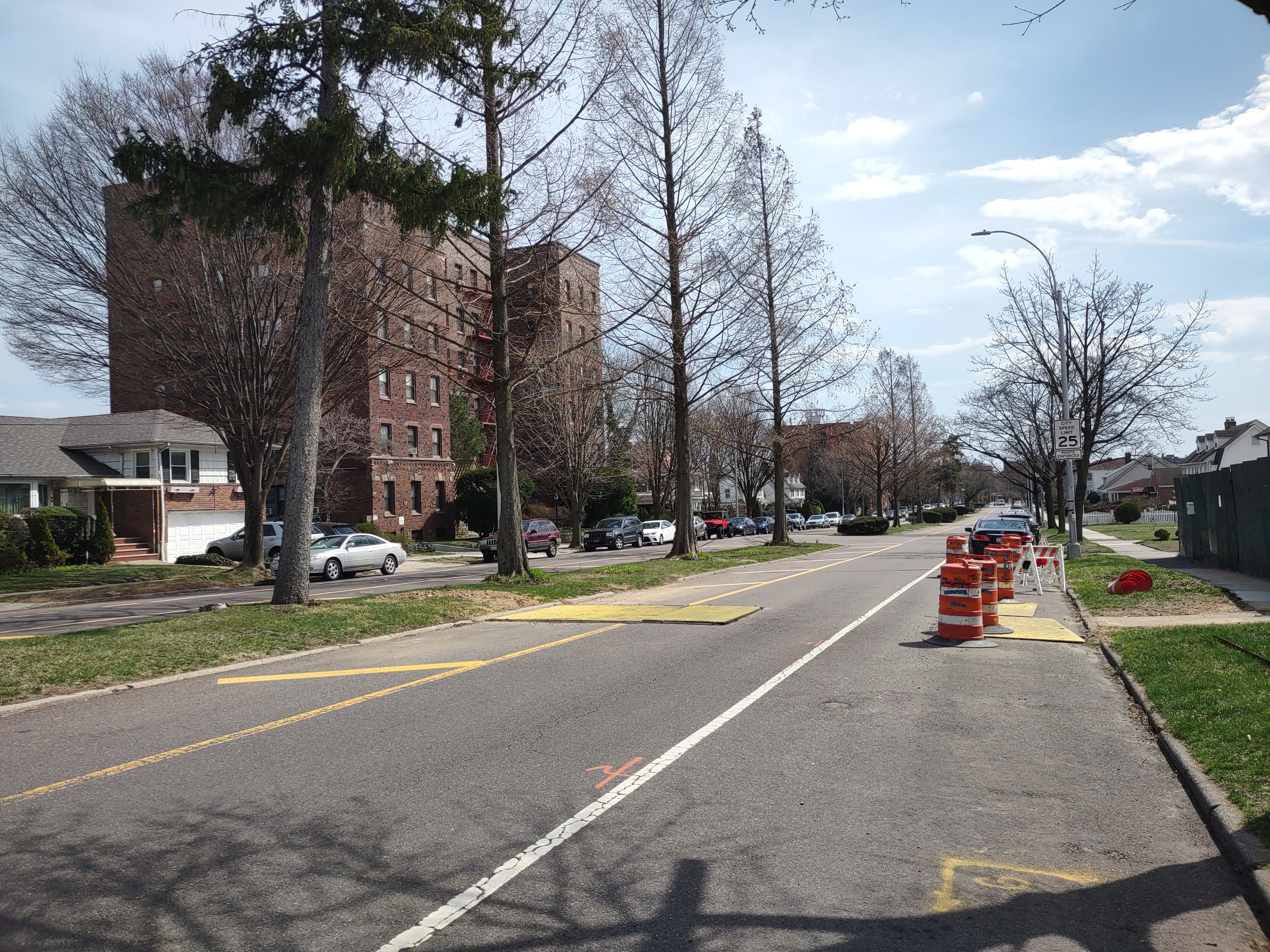
Foothill Malls in March 2025.

Foothill Malls is a series of eight traffic medians straddling 193rd Street between Foothill Avenue and Jamaica Avenue in the Hollis neighborhood of Queens, New York City.

The surrounding neighborhood was developed in 1885 by Frederick W. Dunton who acquired 136 acres of land to the east of Jamaica for a suburban development. Similar in design to Jamaica Estates, the Holliswood section consisted of detached single-family homes, winding streets, and plenty of green landscaping atop the glacial terminal moraine, while parcels to the south of Hillside Avenue were divided in a rectangular grid in a section designated as Hollis Park Gardens. The central road connecting the two developments was Hollis Park Boulevard, later renamed 193rd Street. Inspired by urban boulevards, it contains malls between Foothill Avenue and Jamaica Avenue.

In 1920, the Hollis World War Memorial was installed at the northern side of Hillside Avenue at 193rd Street, listing all Hollis residents killed in World War One, including those who served in the Army, Navy, Marine Corps, Canadian Forces and wartime service through the American Red Cross and YMCA. The plaque on a stone monument is flanked by a flagpole.
