= Foothill High School =

Foothill High School may refer to:

- Foothill High School (Bakersfield, California)
- Foothill High School (Henderson, Nevada)
- Foothill High School (Orange County, California)
- Foothill High School (Palo Cedro, California)
- Foothill High School (Pleasanton, California)
- Foothill High School (Sacramento, California)
- Foothill High School (Ventura, California)

== See also ==
- Foothill Technology High School, Ventura, California
- Foothills Christian High School, El Cajon, San Diego County, California
