= Corona-Norco Unified School District =

Public school district in Riverside County, California

Address
- 2820 Clark Avenue Norco, California, 92860; United States
- Coordinates: 33°55′20″N 117°33′39″W

District information
- Type: Public
- Superintendent: Dr. Sam Buenrostro
- NCES District ID: 0609850

Students and staff
- Students: 51,318 (2020–2021)
- Teachers: 2,062.96 (FTE)
- Staff: 1,972.75 (FTE)
- Student–teacher ratio: 24.88:1

Other information
- Website: www.cnusd.k12.ca.us

The Corona-Norco Unified School District (CNUSD) is a school district in Riverside County, California, United States, serving the cities of Corona, Norco, and Eastvale, along with the CDPs of Coronita, El Cerrito, Home Gardens, Lake Mathews and Temescal Valley, and a small portion of Jurupa Valley. It is the largest public school district in Riverside County (5th largest in SoCal after LA Unified, San Diego Unified, Long Beach Unified, and San Bernardino City Unified) and was named the California Exemplary School District of 2019. CNUSD has 50 schools in operation: 30 elementary schools, 3 K–8 academies, 8 intermediate schools, 1 Hybrid school, and 8 high schools. The school board is composed of five members, elected by geographical district and serve a four-year term with the elections being held in November of even-numbered years.

== High schools ==
- Santiago High School
- Centennial High School
- Corona High School
- Eleanor Roosevelt High School
- John F. Kennedy Middle College High School
- Lee Pollard High School
- Norco High School
- Orange Grove High School
- Academy of Innovation/Online Learning

== Intermediate schools ==
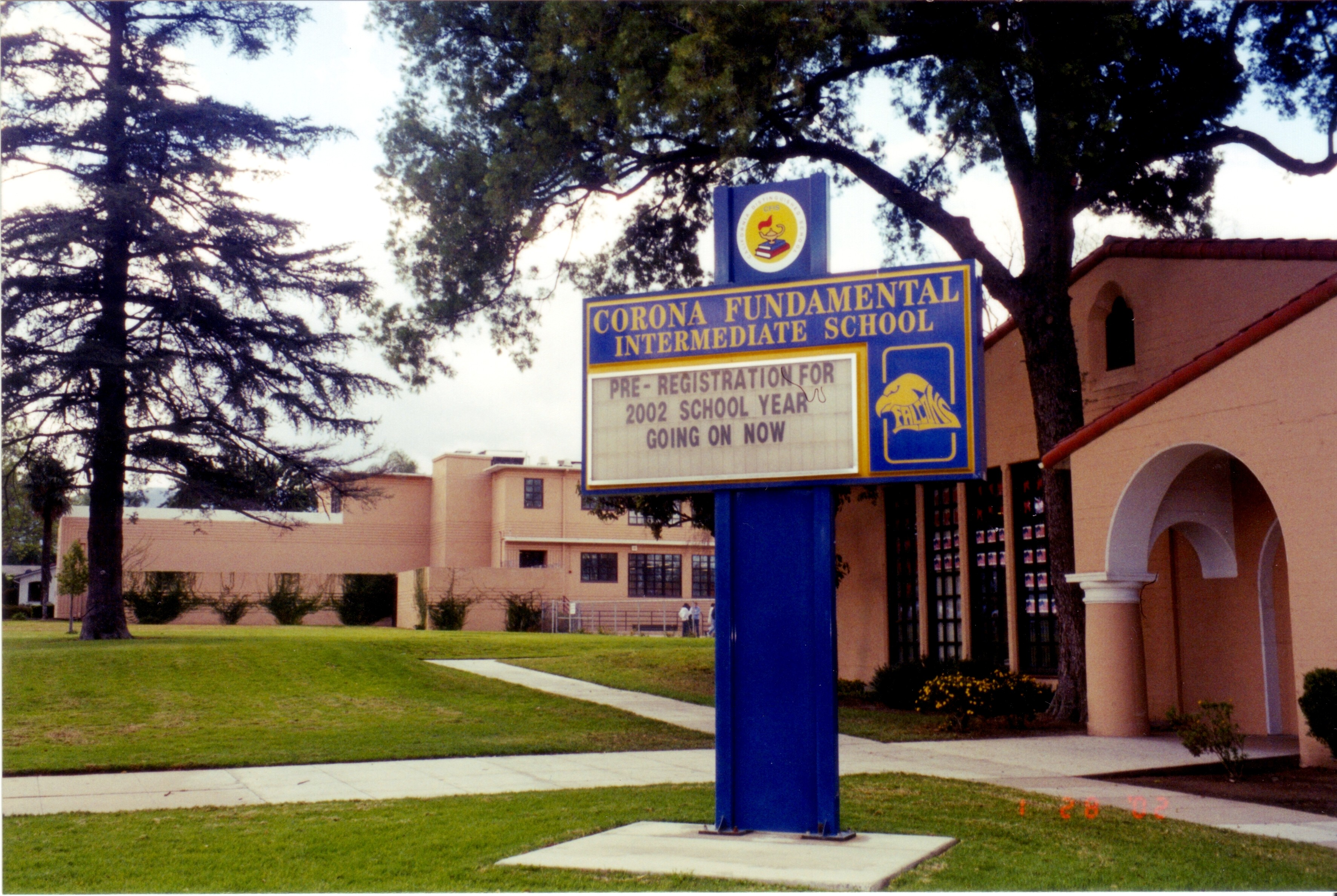
Corona Fundamental Intermediate School (formerly Corona Jr. High School) opened in 1923 and moved to its current site in 1948 (pictured).

- Auburndale Intermediate School
- Citrus Hills Intermediate School
- Corona Fundamental Intermediate School
- El Cerrito Middle School
- Norco Intermediate School
- Raney Intermediate School
- River Heights Intermediate School
- Dr. Augustine Ramirez Intermediate School
- Chavez K–8 Academy
- Home Gardens K–8 Academy

== Elementary schools ==
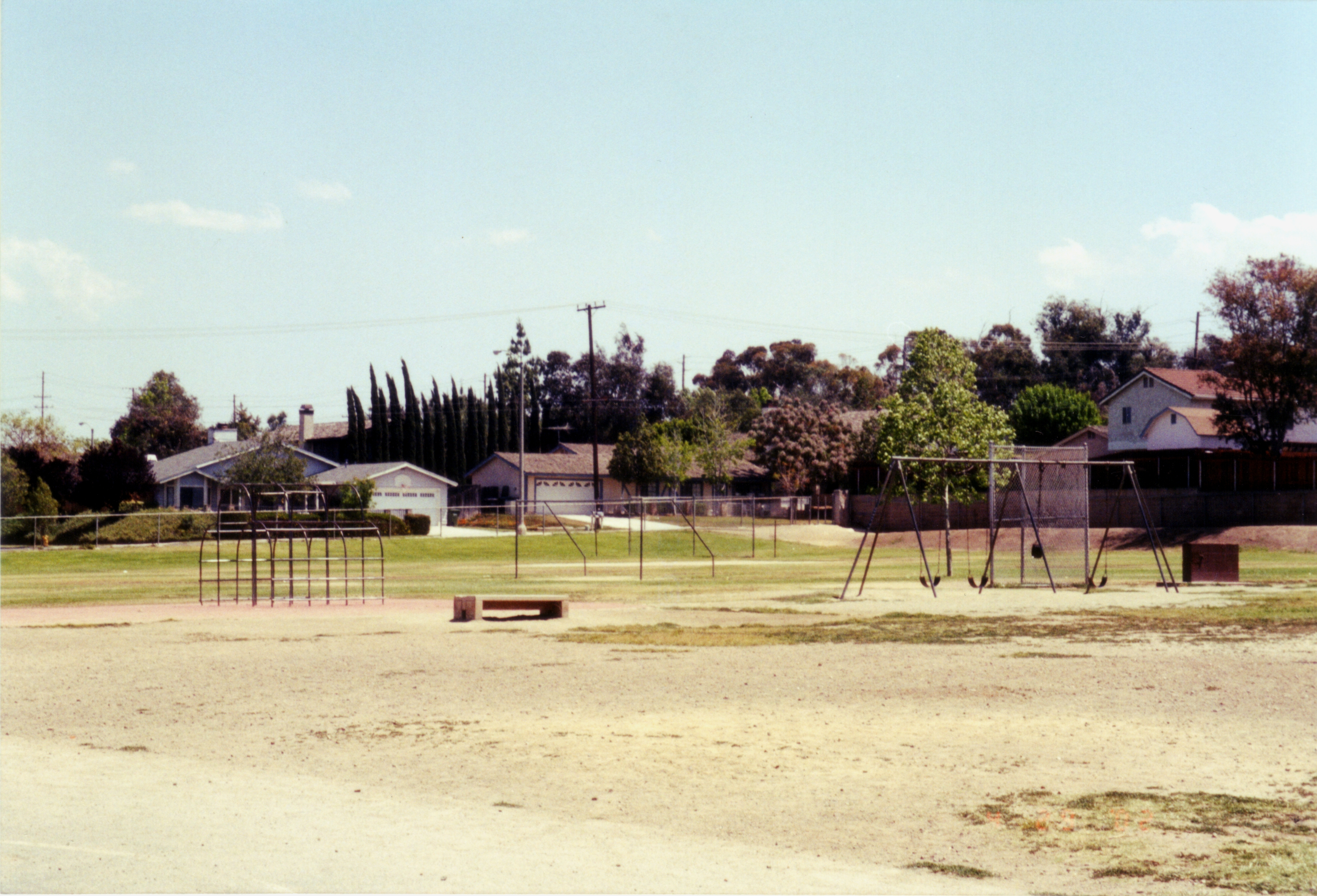
Vicentia Elementary School's playground, pictured in 2002.

- Adams Elementary School
- Susan B. Anthony Elementary School
- Clara Barton Elementary School
- Corona Ranch Elementary School
- Coronita Elementary School
- Eastvale Elementary School
- Eisenhower Elementary School
- Foothill Elementary School
- Franklin Elementary School
- Garretson Elementary School
- Harada Elementary School
- Highland Elementary School
- Jefferson Elementary School
- Lincoln Fundamental School
- McKinley Elementary School
- Norco Elementary School
- Orange Elementary School
- Parkridge School for the Arts
- Parks Elementary School
- Prado View Elementary School
- Rondo School Of Discovery
- Riverview Elementary School
- Ronald Reagan Elementary School
- Sierra Vista Elementary School
- Stallings Elementary School
- Temescal Valley Elementary School
- Dr. Bernice Todd Elementary
- VanderMolen Elementary School
- Vicentia Elementary School
- Washington Elementary School
- Wilson Elementary School

== Alternative Education ==
- Victress Bower School School (For disabled students K-12)
