= Ken Calvert =

American politician (born 1953)

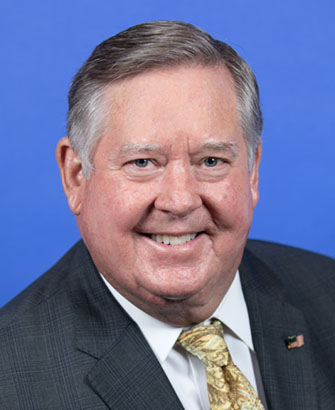
- Official portrait, 2022

Member of the U.S. House of Representatives from California
- Incumbent
- Assumed office January 3, 1993
- Preceded by: Ron Packard (redistricted)
- Constituency: 43rd district (1993–2003); 44th district (2003–2013); 42nd district (2013–2023); 41st district (2023–present)

Personal details
- Born: Kenneth Stanton Calvert; June 8, 1953 (age 73) Corona, California, U.S.
- Party: Republican
- Spouse: Robin Calvert (m. 1978; div. 1993)
- Education: Chaffey College (AA); San Diego State University (BA)
- Website: House website Campaign website
- Calvert's voice Calvert on the death of former U.S. Rep. Jerry Lewis. Recorded July 22, 2021

Kenneth Stanton Calvert (born June 8, 1953) is an American businessman and politician serving as the U.S. representative for California's 41st congressional district, and previously the 44th, 42nd, and 43rd, serving since 1993 as a member of the Republican Party. The district is part of the Inland Empire of Southern California. He chaired the Riverside County Republican Party from 1984 to 1988.

== Early life, education, and business career ==
Calvert was born in Corona, California, to Marceline Hamblen and Ira D. Calvert Jr., and still lives in Corona. In 1970, he joined the congressional campaign of former state Assemblyman Victor Veysey. Calvert graduated from Corona High School in 1971. He worked in Veysey's Washington, D.C., office as an intern after Veysey was re-elected in 1972.

Calvert received an Associate of Arts degree in business from Chaffey Community College in 1973 and a Bachelor of Arts degree from San Diego State University in 1975. After college, he became a small business owner in the restaurant and real estate industries.

== U.S. House of Representatives ==
=== Elections ===
==== 1982 ====
In 1982, the 29-year-old Calvert ran for the United States House of Representatives to represent a newly drawn district. He narrowly lost the Republican primary to Riverside County Supervisor Al McCandless, who was the choice of the Republican establishment. McCandless won the general election.

==== 1992 ====
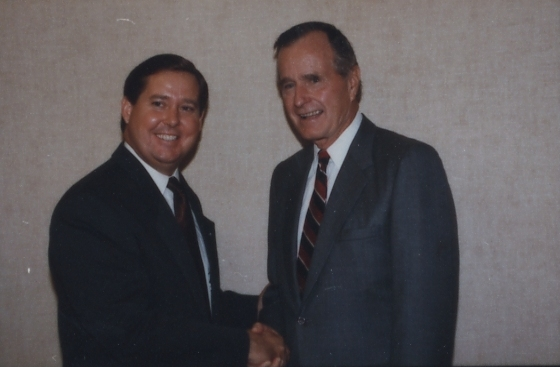
Calvert with President George H. W. Bush in 1992

Calvert was first elected to the US House in a new district in 1992, while McCandless was reelected in a different district. Calvert won the general election with 47% of the vote, defeating Democrat Mark Takano by 519 votes.

==== 1994 ====
In 1994, he defeated Joe Khoury in the Republican primary, 51% to 49%. He was reelected in the 1994 general election with 55% of the vote, again defeating Takano.

==== 1996 ====
In 1996, Calvert was reelected with 54% of the vote, defeating Democrat Guy Kimbrough.

==== 1998 ====
In 1998 he defeated Democrat Mike Rayburn with 55% of the vote.

==== 2000 ====
Calvert won again in 2000 with 74% of the vote, facing no major-party opposition.

==== 2002 ====
Calvert was reelected in 2002, defeating college administrator Louis Vandenberg with 64% of the vote.

==== 2004-2006 ====
He defeated Vandenberg again in 2004 with 61% of the vote, and in 2006 with 60% of the vote.

==== 2008 ====
In 2008, Calvert defeated Democratic nominee Bill Hedrick by 25,582 to 15,952 votes. He declared victory immediately, but Hedrick waited three weeks before conceding, due to unusually high turnout prolonging the vote-counting process.

==== 2010 ====
In 2010, Hedrick ran against Calvert again. While most pundits, such as Larry Sabato, expected him to lose again, sources such as The New York Times ranked the race more competitive. The New York Times re-ranked this race from solid Republican to leaning Republican. Calvert won by ten percentage points.

==== 2012 ====
The National Journal's Cook Political Report named Calvert one of the top 10 Republicans most vulnerable to redistricting in 2012, largely due to his district's rapidly growing Hispanic population. Despite this, Calvert defeated opponent Michael Williamson with 61% of the vote.

==== 2014 ====
Calvert ran for a twelfth term and defeated Democratic candidate Tim Sheridan in the general election.

==== 2016 ====
Calvert ran for a thirteenth term and defeated Democratic candidate Tim Sheridan for a second time in the general election.

==== 2018 ====
Calvert ran for a fourteenth term and defeated Democratic candidate Julia Peacock in the general election.

==== 2020 ====
Calvert ran for a fifteenth term and defeated Democratic candidate Liam O'Mara in the general election

==== 2022 ====
Calvert sought reelection in California's 41st congressional district due to redistricting. He defeated Democrat Will Rollins in the general election, winning a sixteenth term in the U.S. House.

==== 2024 ====
Calvert won a seventeenth term in a rematch against former prosecutor and 2022 Democratic candidate Will Rollins.

==== 2026 ====
Calvert sought reelection to his eighteenth term in California's 40th congressional district due to redistricting after the passage of Proposition 50 in November 2025. He defeated fellow Republican Young Kim, who had represented the district since 2023.

=== Tenure ===
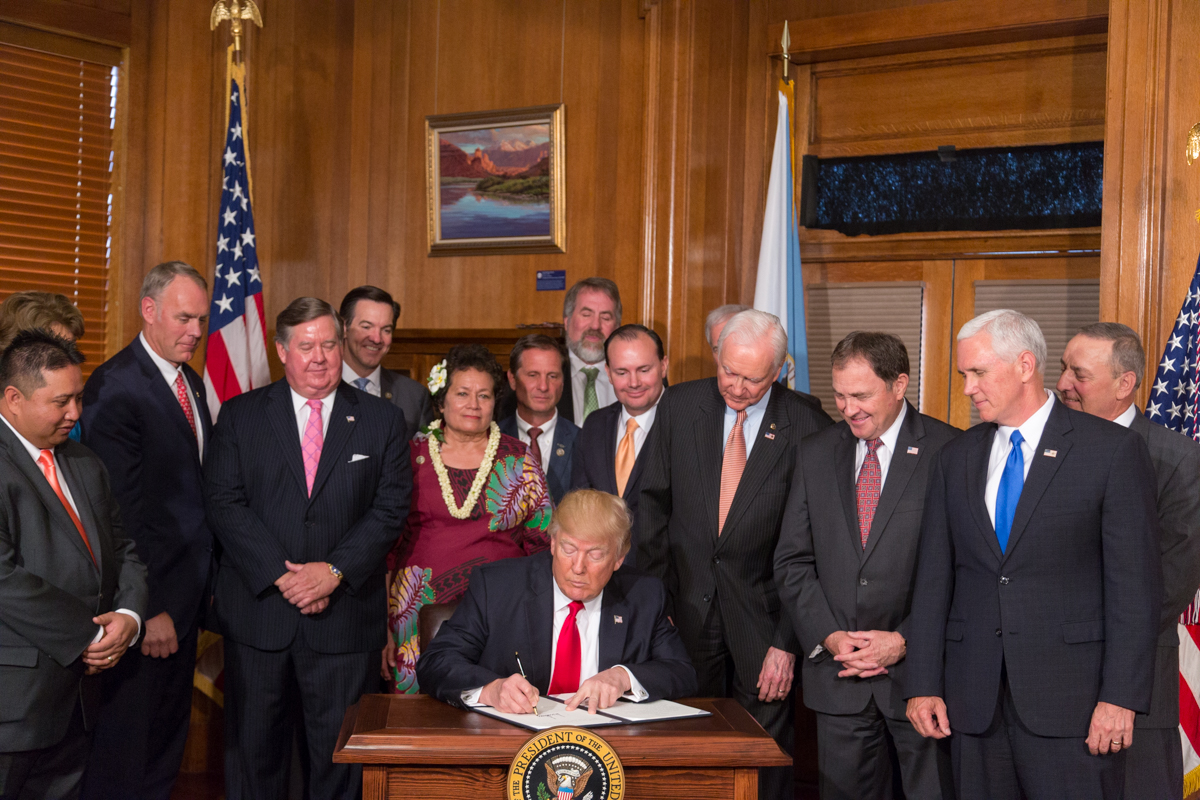
Calvert watches as President Donald Trump signs Executive Order 13792 in 2017

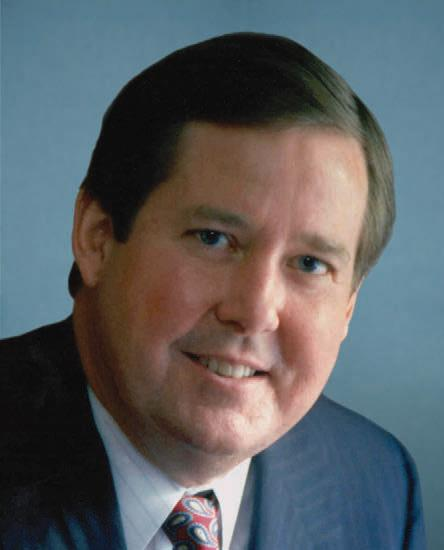
Calvert during the 111th Congress

On June 10, 2009, Calvert introduced H.R. 2788, the Distinguished Flying Cross National Memorial Act. This Act designates a national memorial at March Field Air Museum in honor of current and former members of the armed forces who have been awarded the Distinguished Flying Cross. Calvert worked to assemble a bipartisan group of 48 cosponsors for this legislation. On March 19, 2010, H.R. 2788 unanimously passed the House of Representatives. Calvert introduced H. Res. 377, a bill recognizing Armed Forces Day and the service of the members of the United States Armed Forces on April 29, 2009. This bill received 70 bipartisan cosponsorships and passed the House unanimously on May 14, 2009.

On March 25, 2010, Calvert introduced H. Res. 1219 to support the designation of a National Child Awareness Month to promote awareness of children's charities and youth-serving organizations across the country. He assembled 40 bipartisan cosponsors for this bill and on July 19, 2010, the bill passed the House with unanimous support.

Calvert is a member of the Republican Main Street Partnership.

In December 2017, Calvert voted in favor of the Tax Cuts and Jobs Act, calling it "the most pro-growth tax policy our country has seen in decades." He also said that it would provide "lower taxes, more jobs, and higher wages."

In 2025, Calvert worked with California Governor Gavin Newsom to secure wildfire aid for California after the January 2025 Southern California wildfires.

=== Committee assignments ===
For the 118th Congress:

- Committee on Appropriations
  - Subcommittee on Defense (Chair)
  - Subcommittee on Energy and Water Development and Related Agencies

=== Caucus memberships ===
- House Baltic Caucus
- Congressional Taiwan Caucus
- Congressional Western Caucus
- Rare Disease Caucus
- United States Congressional International Conservation Caucus

== Political positions ==
=== Domestic issues ===
As Chairman of the Resources Subcommittee on Water and Power, Calvert introduced H.R. 2828, The Water Supply, Reliability, and Environmental Improvement Act, which reauthorizes the CALFED Bay-Delta program. The CALFED Bay-Delta Program is a unique collaboration among 25 state and federal agencies that came together with a mission to improve California's water supply and the ecological health of the San Francisco Bay/Sacramento-San Joaquin River Delta. H.R. 2828 provides a long-term federal authorization for the western region for water supply and reliability. The bill became Public Law 108-361.

In December 2020, Calvert signed onto the lawsuit seeking to overturn the 2020 presidential election. The Supreme Court refused to hear the case on December 11.

In January 2021, Calvert voted with six other Republican representatives from California to reject the certification of Arizona's and Pennsylvania's electoral votes. He questioned the results of the election, saying: "during difficult and divisive times in our nation I believe we must follow the Constitution. That's why today I lent my voice to the millions of Americans and my constituents who are deeply concerned by the integrity of the election ... I remain especially troubled by constitutionally questionable changes of voting rules in some states by authorities other than state legislatures."

==== Immigration ====
Calvert is the original author of the E-Verify law, the only employment verification program available to employers to check the work authorization status of newly hired employees. In 1995, he introduced H.R. 502, which was later included in the immigration reform bill, H.R. 2202. The immigration reforms were later wrapped into the FY1997 Omnibus Appropriations Act. The original program, known as the Basic Pilot Program, was only available to five states and employers used a call-in system. In the 12 years since its implementation, the Basic Pilot Program, now known as E-Verify, has expanded nationwide and is used by over 100,000 employers. Arizona and Mississippi have made use of E-Verify mandatory. In the 111th Congress Calvert again introduced legislation to make use of E-Verify mandatory.

=== Military and foreign policy ===
In September 2023, Calvert criticized the Freedom Caucus for stalling annual Pentagon funding legislation. Calvert said "what's happening is the military is being held hostage to these procedural votes, so that can't happen."

Rep. Calvert "favors strategic reviews that could lead to funding cuts for aircraft carriers and Abrams tanks, asserting they are not suitable for modern warfare against a peer adversary like China."

In 2023, Calvert voted to provide Israel with support following the October 7 attacks.

=== Space ===
In the 109th Congress, Calvert chaired the Space and Aeronautics Subcommittee, which oversees NASA. As chair, he introduced and passed into law the NASA Authorization Act of 2005 (P.L. 109–155), the first reauthorization bill of civilian space and aeronautics agency in five years. The reauthorization provided NASA with the direction and tools to implement President George W. Bush's vision for space exploration while stressing the importance of NASA's earth and space science and aeronautics work.

=== Social issues ===
Calvert supported the overturning of Roe v. Wade, saying it "shifts the power to set abortion policies to Congress and to the States".

Calvert opposed gay people serving in the military.

In 2009, he voted against the Matthew Shepard and James Byrd Jr. Hate Crimes Prevention Act.

In July 2022, Calvert and 46 other Republican U.S. representatives voted for the Respect for Marriage Act, which codified the right to same-sex marriage in federal law.

== Personal life ==
Calvert is an Episcopalian. Calvert was previously married to Robin Calvert; they divorced in 1993.

Calvert's father committed suicide in 1993.

In November 1993, two Corona police officers found Calvert with a prostitute in his car. He told the police that he and the woman were "just talking". The Press-Enterprise later went to court to force the Corona police to release the police report. After the report was released, Calvert admitted to having sex with the woman in his car; the police did not have enough evidence to arrest him, as there was no witness to any exchange of money.

U.S. House of Representatives
Preceded by Ron Packard	Member of the U.S. House of Representatives from California's 43rd congressional district 1993–2003	Succeeded by Joe Baca
Preceded by Mary Bono	Member of the U.S. House of Representatives from California's 44th congressional district 2003–2013	Succeeded by Janice Hahn
Preceded by Gary Miller	Member of the U.S. House of Representatives from California's 42nd congressional district 2013–2023	Succeeded by Robert Garcia
Preceded by Mark Takano	Member of the U.S. House of Representatives from California's 41st congressional district 2023–present	Incumbent
U.S. order of precedence (ceremonial)
Preceded by Sanford Bishop	United States representatives by seniority 12th	Succeeded by Jim Clyburn
Preceded by Nydia Velázquez	Order of precedence of the United States	Succeeded by Bennie Thompson
