= 2014 California gubernatorial election =

- November 4, 2014
- Turnout: 30.94% (▼28.65 pp)
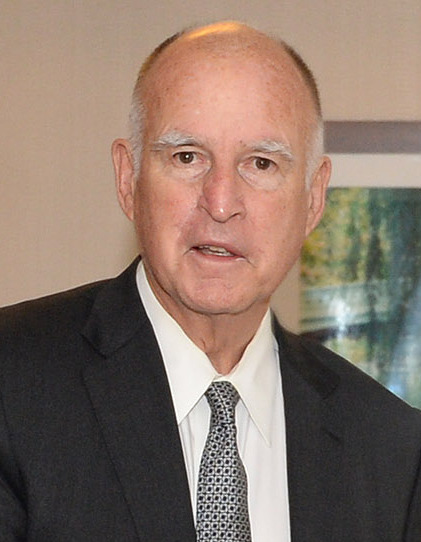

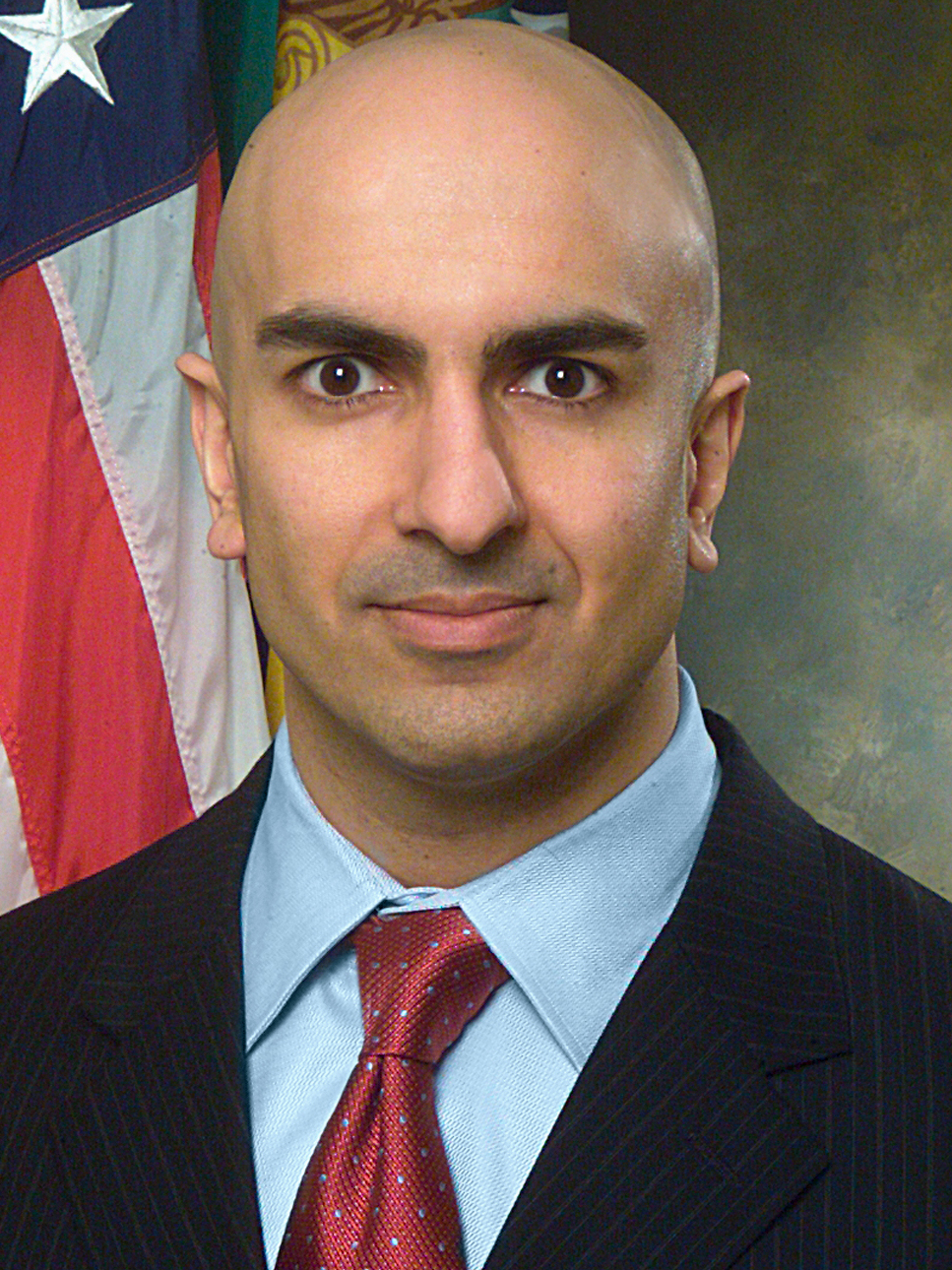
| Candidate | Jerry Brown | Neel Kashkari |
| Party | Democratic | Republican |
| Popular vote | 4,388,368 | 2,929,213 |
| Percentage | 59.97% | 40.03% |
- Brown: 50–60% 60–70% 70–80% 80–90% >90% Kashkari: 50–60% 60–70% 70–80%
Governor before election
Jerry Brown
Democratic
Elected Governor
Jerry Brown
Democratic

The 2014 California gubernatorial election was held on November 4, 2014, to elect the governor of California, concurrently with elections for the rest of California's executive branch, as well as elections to the United States Senate in other states and elections to the United States House of Representatives and various state and local elections.

Incumbent Democratic Governor Jerry Brown ran for election to a second consecutive and fourth overall term in office. Although governors are limited to lifetime service of two terms in office, Brown previously served as governor from 1975 to 1983, and the law only affects terms served after November 6, 1990.

A primary election was held on June 3, 2014. Under California's nonpartisan blanket primary law, all candidates appear on the same ballot, regardless of party. In the primary, voters may vote for any candidate, regardless of their party affiliation. The top two finishers — regardless of party — advance to the general election in November, even if a candidate manages to receive a majority of the votes cast in the primary election. Washington is the only other state with this system, a top two primary (Louisiana has a similar primary). Brown and Republican Neel Kashkari finished first and second, respectively, which Brown won. He won the largest gubernatorial victory since 1986, "despite running a virtually nonexistent campaign." This was the first time since 1978 that a Democrat carried Nevada County.

== Primary election ==
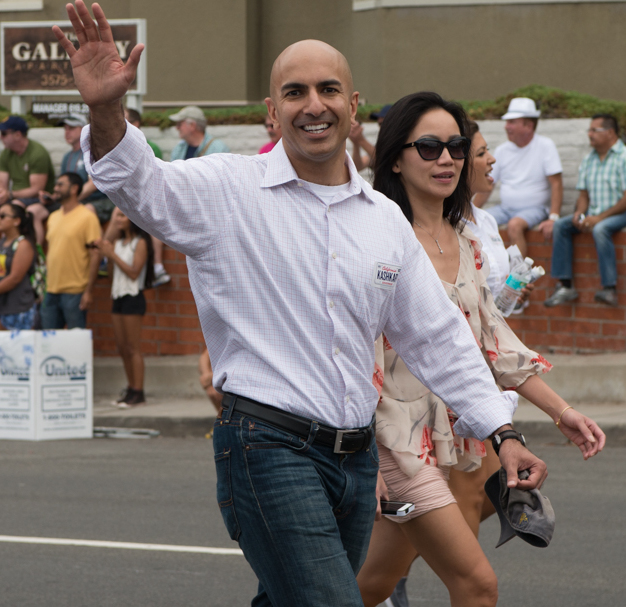
Republican candidate Kashkari campaigns at the San Diego LGBT Pride Parade.

A certified list of candidates was released by the secretary of state on March 27, 2014. The primary election took place on Tuesday, June 3, 2014, from 7am to 8pm.

=== Party candidacies ===
==== Democratic Party ====
===== Declared =====
- Akinyemi Agbede, candidate for Mayor of Orange County, Florida in 2010
- Jerry Brown, incumbent governor of California

===== Withdrew =====
- Geby Espinosa, gym owner
- Hanala Sagal, author and fitness personality
- Michael Strimling, attorney

===== Declined =====
- Kamala Harris, Attorney General of California (ran for re-election)
- Gavin Newsom, Lieutenant Governor of California (ran for re-election)
- Hilda Solis, former United States Secretary of Labor and former U.S. representative (ran for Los Angeles County Board of Supervisors)
- Antonio Villaraigosa, former Mayor of Los Angeles

==== Republican Party ====
===== Declared =====
- Richard Aguirre, real estate investor and Democratic candidate for governor in 2010
- Glenn Champ, businessman and engineer
- Tim Donnelly, state assemblyman and Minuteman founder
- Neel Kashkari, former acting assistant secretary of the Treasury for financial stability
- Alma Marie Winston

===== Withdrew =====
- Andrew Blount, Mayor of Laguna Hills
- Dennis Jackson, manufacturer
- Abel Maldonado, former lieutenant governor of California, candidate for controller in 2006, and candidate for CA-24 in 2012

===== Declined =====
- Kevin McCarthy, U.S. representative and House Majority Whip
- John Moorlach, Orange County Supervisor
- Steve Poizner, former Insurance Commissioner of California and candidate for governor in 2010
- George Radanovich, former U.S. representative
- Meg Whitman, CEO of Hewlett-Packard, former CEO of eBay and nominee for governor in 2010

==== Green Party ====
===== Declared =====
- Luis J. Rodriguez, author, progressive activist and Justice Party nominee for Vice President of the United States in 2012

==== Peace and Freedom Party ====
===== Declared =====
- Cindy Sheehan, anti-war activist and Peace and Freedom Party nominee for Vice President of the United States in 2012

==== Libertarian Party ====
===== Declined =====
- James P. Gray, former Orange County Superior Court Judge and Libertarian Party nominee for Vice President of the United States in 2012

==== American Independent Party ====
Endorsed Tim Donnelly

===== Withdrew =====
- Robert Ornelas, American Independent Party nominee for Vice President of the United States in 2012

==== Independent ====
===== Declared =====
- Bogdan Ambrozewicz, small business owner, Independent candidate for the State Senate in 2012 and Republican candidate for the State Assembly in 2011
- Janel Buycks, minister/business owner
- Rakesh Kumar Christian, small business owner, independent candidate for governor in 2010
- Joe Leicht, golf course operator
- Robert Newman, psychologist, farmer and Republican candidate for governor in 2003, 2006, and 2010

=== Polling ===
| Poll source | Date(s) administered | Sample size | Margin of error | Jerry Brown (D) | Andrew Blount (R) | Tim Donnelly (R) | Neel Kashkari (R) | Abel Maldonado (R) | Other | Undecided |
|---|---|---|---|---|---|---|---|---|---|---|
| GQR | May 21–28, 2014 | 626 | ± 4.4% | 50% | — | 13% | 18% | — | 5% | 14% |
| SurveyUSA | May 16–19, 2014 | 610 | ± 4% | 57% | — | 18% | 11% | — | 4% | 10% |
| PPIC | May 8–15, 2014 | 901 | ± 4.9% | 48% | — | 15% | 10% | — | 1% | 27% |
| PPIC | April 8–15, 2014 | 944 | ± 5.1% | 46% | 3% | 9% | 2% | — | 2% | 38% |
| Field Poll | March 18–April 5, 2014 | 504 | ± 4.5% | 57% | 3% | 17% | 2% | — | 1% | 20% |
| PPIC | March 11–18, 2014 | 936 | ± 4.7% | 47% | 2% | 10% | 2% | — | 3% | 36% |
| Field Poll | November 15–December 3, 2013 | 836 | ± 3.5% | 52% | — | 9% | 3% | 11% | — | 25% |
| PPIC | November 12–19, 2013 | 1,081 | ± 4.5% | 46% | — | 16% | — | 7% | 1% | 29% |

Polling with all candidates listed

Clear Path Strategies poll of 1,000 likely voters, April 2–6, 2014. MoE: ±?
| Party | Candidate | Votes | % |
|---|---|---|---|
| Democratic | Jerry Brown (incumbent) | – | 45.6 |
| Republican | Tim Donnelly | – | 18.3 |
| Republican | Glenn Champ | – | 7.3 |
| Republican | Andrew Blount | – | 5.4 |
| Republican | Alma Marie Winston | – | 4.1 |
| Republican | Neel Kashkari | – | 3.8 |
| No party preference | Robert Newman | – | 3.1 |
| Democratic | Akinyemi Agbede | – | 2.8 |
| Green | Luis J. Rodriguez | – | 2.6 |
| Peace and Freedom | Cindy Sheehan | – | 2.3 |
| Republican | Richard William Aguirre | – | 1.7 |
| No party preference | "Bo" Bogdan Ambrozewicz | – | 0.9 |
| No party preference | Janel Hyeshia Buycks | – | 0.8 |
| No party preference | Rakesh Kumar Christian | – | 0.7 |
| No party preference | Joe Leicht | – | 0.6 |
| Total votes | | – | 100 |

=== Results ===
Results by county: Donnelly ≥ 30% Brown ≥ 30% Brown ≥ 40% Brown ≥ 50% Brown ≥ 60% Brown ≥ 70% Brown ≥ 80%

California gubernatorial primary election, 2014
| Party | Candidate | Votes | % |
|---|---|---|---|
| Democratic | Jerry Brown (incumbent) | 2,354,769 | 54.34% |
| Republican | Neel Kashkari | 839,767 | 19.38% |
| Republican | Tim Donnelly | 643,236 | 14.85% |
| Republican | Andrew Blount | 89,749 | 2.07% |
| Republican | Glenn Champ | 76,066 | 1.76% |
| Green | Luis J. Rodriguez | 66,872 | 1.54% |
| Peace and Freedom | Cindy Sheehan | 52,707 | 1.22% |
| Republican | Alma Marie Winston | 46,042 | 1.06% |
| No party preference | Robert Newman | 44,120 | 1.02% |
| Democratic | Akinyemi Agbede | 37,024 | 0.85% |
| Republican | Richard William Aguirre | 35,125 | 0.81% |
| No party preference | "Bo" Bogdan Ambrozewicz | 14,929 | 0.35% |
| No party preference | Janel Hyeshia Buycks | 12,136 | 0.28% |
| No party preference | Rakesh Kumar Christian | 11,142 | 0.26% |
| No party preference | Joe Leicht | 9,307 | 0.22% |
| Write-In | Karen Jill Bernal | 17 | <0.01% |
| Write-In | Nickolas Wildstar | 17 | <0.01% |
| Write-In | Jimelle L. Walls | 3 | <0.01% |
| Total votes | | 4,333,028 | 100.00% |
| Turnout | | | 14.67% |

== General election ==
=== Debates ===
- Complete video of debate, September 4, 2014 - C-SPAN

=== Predictions ===
| Source | Ranking | As of |
|---|---|---|
| The Cook Political Report | Solid D | November 3, 2014 |
| Sabato's Crystal Ball | Safe D | November 3, 2014 |
| Rothenberg Political Report | Safe D | November 3, 2014 |
| Real Clear Politics | Safe D | November 3, 2014 |

=== Polling ===
| Poll source | Date(s) administered | Sample size | Margin of error | Jerry Brown (D) | Neel Kashkari (R) | Other | Undecided |
|---|---|---|---|---|---|---|---|
| Zogby Analytics | October 28–31, 2014 | 705 | ± 3.8% | 51% | 33% | 16% | |
| GQR/American Viewpoint | October 22–29, 2014 | 1,162 | ± 3.3% | 56% | 37% | — | 7% |
| Field Poll | October 15–28, 2014 | 941 | ± 3.4% | 54% | 33% | — | 13% |
| CBS News/NYT/YouGov | October 16–23, 2014 | 7,463 | ± 2% | 55% | 37% | 1% | 8% |
| PPIC | October 12–19, 2014 | 1,704 | ± 3.5% | 52% | 36% | — | 12% |
| CBS News/NYT/YouGov | September 20 – October 1, 2014 | 7,943 | ± 2% | 56% | 36% | 1% | 7% |
| PPIC | September 8–15, 2014 | 916 | ± 4.9% | 54% | 33% | 2% | 11% |
| LA Times/USC | September 2–9, 2014 | 1,089 | ± 3.3% | 57% | 36% | — | 7% |
| GQR/AV | September 2–8, 2014 | 8,941 | ± 2% | 57% | 32% | — | 11% |
| CBS News/NYT/YouGov | August 18 – September 2, 2014 | 8,941 | ± 2% | 53% | 35% | 2% | 10% |
| Field Poll | August 14–28, 2014 | 467 | ± 4.8% | 50% | 34% | — | 16% |
| Gravis Marketing | July 22–24, 2014 | 580 | ± 4% | 52% | 35% | — | 13% |
| CBS News/NYT/YouGov | July 5–24, 2014 | 9,393 | ± ? | 57% | 33% | 3% | 7% |
| PPIC | July 8–15, 2014 | 984 | ± 4.7% | 52% | 33% | 4% | 11% |
| Field Poll | June 5–22, 2014 | 2,013 | ± 3.2% | 52% | 32% | 0% | 16% |
| Rasmussen Reports | June 4–5, 2014 | 823 | ± 4% | 52% | 33% | 5% | 10% |
| GQR | May 21–28, 2014 | 626 | ± 4.4% | 53% | 35% | 2% | 9% |
| MFour/Tulchin Research | August 27–30, 2013 | 1,001 | ± 3.5% | 44% | 15% | 8% | 33% |

Hypothetical polling

| Poll source | Date(s) administered | Sample size | Margin of error | Jerry Brown (D) | Tim Donnelly (R) | Other | Undecided |
|---|---|---|---|---|---|---|---|
| GQR | May 21–28, 2014 | 626 | ± 4.4% | 54% | 32% | 3% | 11% |
| PPIC | January 14–21, 2014 | 1,706 | ± 3.8% | 53% | 17% | — | 30% |
| MFour/Tulchin Research | August 27–30, 2013 | 1,001 | ± 3.5% | 43% | 21% | 7% | 30% |

| Poll source | Date(s) administered | Sample size | Margin of error | Jerry Brown (D) | Abel Maldonado (R) | Other | Undecided |
|---|---|---|---|---|---|---|---|
| MFour/Tulchin Research | August 27–30, 2013 | 1,001 | ± 3.5% | 42% | 21% | 9% | 29% |

=== Results ===
Brown won easily, by nearly twenty points. He outperformed his majority margin from 2010. As expected, Brown did very well in Los Angeles and in the San Francisco Bay Area. Kashkari conceded defeat right after the polls closed in California.

2014 California gubernatorial election
| Party | Candidate | Votes | % | ±% |
|---|---|---|---|---|
| Democratic | Jerry Brown (incumbent) | 4,388,368 | 59.97% | +6.20% |
| Republican | Neel Kashkari | 2,929,213 | 40.03% | −0.86% |
| Total votes | | 7,317,581 | 100.00% | N/A |
| Democratic hold | | | | |

==== By county ====
| County | Jerry Brown Democratic | | Neel Kashkari Republican | | Margin | | Total votes cast |
| County | # | % | # | % | # | % | Total votes cast |
|---|---|---|---|---|---|---|---|
| Alameda | 293,081 | 82.17% | 63,593 | 17.83% | 229,488 | 64.34% | 356,674 |
| Alpine | 284 | 61.87% | 175 | 38.13% | 109 | 23.75% | 459 |
| Amador | 5,682 | 44.55% | 7,071 | 55.45% | -1,389 | -10.89% | 12,753 |
| Butte | 29,520 | 47.79% | 32,249 | 52.21% | -2,729 | -4.42% | 61,769 |
| Calaveras | 6,870 | 43.73% | 8,841 | 56.27% | -1,971 | -12.55% | 15,711 |
| Colusa | 1,789 | 42.73% | 2,398 | 57.27% | -609 | -14.55% | 4,187 |
| Contra Costa | 174,403 | 68.65% | 79,660 | 31.35% | 94,743 | 37.29% | 254,063 |
| Del Norte | 3,488 | 49.64% | 3,539 | 50.36% | -51 | -0.73% | 7,027 |
| El Dorado | 27,916 | 45.50% | 33,443 | 54.50% | -5,527 | -9.01% | 61,359 |
| Fresno | 76,143 | 47.62% | 83,744 | 52.38% | -7,601 | -4.75% | 159,887 |
| Glenn | 2,049 | 34.40% | 3,908 | 65.60% | -1,859 | -31.21% | 5,957 |
| Humboldt | 24,003 | 64.61% | 13,146 | 35.39% | 10,857 | 29.23% | 37,149 |
| Imperial | 13,457 | 64.26% | 7,484 | 35.74% | 5,973 | 28.52% | 20,941 |
| Inyo | 2,317 | 42.68% | 3,112 | 57.32% | -795 | -14.64% | 5,429 |
| Kern | 54,269 | 40.90% | 78,417 | 59.10% | -24,148 | -18.20% | 132,686 |
| Kings | 8,752 | 39.20% | 13,575 | 60.80% | -4,823 | -21.60% | 22,327 |
| Lake | 10,722 | 61.28% | 6,775 | 38.72% | 3,947 | 22.56% | 17,497 |
| Lassen | 2,213 | 32.44% | 4,609 | 67.56% | -2,396 | -35.12% | 6,822 |
| Los Angeles | 978,142 | 66.84% | 485,186 | 33.16% | 492,956 | 33.69% | 1,463,328 |
| Madera | 9,974 | 37.22% | 16,825 | 62.78% | -6,851 | -25.56% | 26,799 |
| Marin | 69,751 | 79.35% | 18,147 | 20.65% | 51,604 | 58.71% | 87,898 |
| Mariposa | 2,499 | 38.23% | 4,038 | 61.77% | -1,539 | -23.54% | 6,537 |
| Mendocino | 17,340 | 71.76% | 6,825 | 28.24% | 10,515 | 43.51% | 24,165 |
| Merced | 18,945 | 50.13% | 18,848 | 49.87% | 97 | 0.26% | 37,793 |
| Modoc | 770 | 27.20% | 2,061 | 72.80% | -1,291 | -45.60% | 2,831 |
| Mono | 1,632 | 53.09% | 1,442 | 46.91% | 190 | 6.18% | 3,074 |
| Monterey | 51,315 | 69.43% | 22,591 | 30.57% | 28,724 | 38.87% | 73,906 |
| Napa | 25,846 | 68.19% | 12,059 | 31.81% | 13,787 | 36.37% | 37,905 |
| Nevada | 20,976 | 54.63% | 17,419 | 45.37% | 3,557 | 9.26% | 38,395 |
| Orange | 275,707 | 44.43% | 344,817 | 55.57% | -69,110 | -11.14% | 620,524 |
| Placer | 51,241 | 45.41% | 61,604 | 54.59% | -10,363 | -9.18% | 112,845 |
| Plumas | 2,966 | 41.75% | 4,139 | 58.25% | -1,173 | -16.51% | 7,105 |
| Riverside | 165,340 | 47.09% | 185,805 | 52.91% | -20,465 | -5.83% | 351,145 |
| Sacramento | 202,416 | 62.33% | 122,342 | 37.67% | 80,074 | 24.66% | 324,758 |
| San Benito | 8,654 | 63.52% | 4,969 | 36.48% | 3,685 | 27.05% | 13,623 |
| San Bernardino | 134,417 | 46.86% | 152,458 | 53.14% | -18,041 | -6.29% | 286,875 |
| San Diego | 346,419 | 51.07% | 331,942 | 48.93% | 14,477 | 2.13% | 678,361 |
| San Francisco | 196,745 | 88.15% | 26,442 | 11.85% | 170,303 | 76.31% | 223,187 |
| San Joaquin | 62,614 | 53.54% | 54,331 | 46.46% | 8,283 | 7.08% | 116,945 |
| San Luis Obispo | 46,606 | 54.32% | 39,186 | 45.68% | 7,420 | 8.65% | 85,792 |
| San Mateo | 120,280 | 75.22% | 39,615 | 24.78% | 80,665 | 50.45% | 159,895 |
| Santa Barbara | 64,912 | 58.26% | 46,503 | 41.74% | 18,409 | 16.52% | 111,415 |
| Santa Clara | 288,732 | 72.94% | 107,113 | 27.06% | 181,619 | 45.88% | 395,845 |
| Santa Cruz | 56,977 | 78.61% | 15,499 | 21.39% | 41,478 | 57.23% | 72,476 |
| Shasta | 21,509 | 38.06% | 35,007 | 61.94% | -13,498 | -23.88% | 56,516 |
| Sierra | 679 | 44.21% | 857 | 55.79% | -178 | -11.59% | 1,536 |
| Siskiyou | 6,103 | 44.16% | 7,717 | 55.84% | -1,614 | -11.68% | 13,820 |
| Solano | 57,874 | 64.57% | 31,754 | 35.43% | 26,120 | 29.14% | 89,628 |
| Sonoma | 107,328 | 74.75% | 36,249 | 25.25% | 71,079 | 49.51% | 143,577 |
| Stanislaus | 46,566 | 51.54% | 43,786 | 48.46% | 2,780 | 3.08% | 90,352 |
| Sutter | 8,688 | 42.73% | 11,644 | 57.27% | -2,956 | -14.54% | 20,332 |
| Tehama | 5,408 | 35.21% | 9,952 | 64.79% | -4,544 | -29.58% | 15,360 |
| Trinity | 1,711 | 44.17% | 2,163 | 55.83% | -452 | -11.67% | 3,874 |
| Tulare | 23,708 | 38.42% | 37,996 | 61.58% | -14,288 | -23.16% | 61,704 |
| Tuolumne | 7,951 | 46.75% | 9,058 | 53.25% | -1,107 | -6.51% | 17,009 |
| Ventura | 106,072 | 53.07% | 93,797 | 46.93% | 12,275 | 6.14% | 199,869 |
| Yolo | 31,431 | 69.12% | 14,043 | 30.88% | 17,388 | 38.24% | 45,474 |
| Yuba | 5,166 | 41.62% | 7,245 | 58.38% | -2,079 | -16.75% | 12,411 |
| Total | 4,388,368 | 59.97% | 2,929,213 | 40.03% | 1,459,155 | 19.94% | 7,317,581 |

Counties that flipped from Democratic to Republican

- Del Norte (largest community: Crescent City)

Counties that flipped from Republican to Democratic

- Merced (largest community: Merced)
- Mono (largest municipality: Mammoth Lakes)
- Nevada (largest town: Truckee)
- San Luis Obispo (largest town: San Luis Obispo)
- San Diego (largest community: San Diego)
- Stanislaus (largest community: Modesto)
- Ventura (largest city: Ventura)

==== By congressional district ====
Brown won 41 of 53 congressional districts, including two held by Republicans.

| District | Brown | Kashkari | Representative |
|---|---|---|---|
| 1st | 43% | 57% | Doug LaMalfa |
| 2nd | 73% | 27% | Jared Huffman |
| 3rd | 56% | 44% | John Garamendi |
| 4th | 45% | 55% | Tom McClintock |
| 5th | 73% | 27% | Mike Thompson |
| 6th | 73% | 27% | Doris Matsui |
| 7th | 56% | 44% | Ami Bera |
| 8th | 38% | 62% | Paul Cook |
| 9th | 55% | 45% | Jerry McNerney |
| 10th | 52% | 48% | Jeff Denham |
| 11th | 70% | 30% | Mark DeSaulnier |
| 12th | 89% | 11% | Nancy Pelosi |
| 13th | 91% | 9% | Barbara Lee |
| 14th | 78% | 22% | Jackie Speier |
| 15th | 70% | 30% | Eric Swalwell |
| 16th | 54% | 46% | Jim Costa |
| 17th | 75% | 25% | Mike Honda |
| 18th | 72% | 28% | Anna Eshoo |
| 19th | 73% | 27% | Zoe Lofgren |
| 20th | 73% | 27% | Sam Farr |
| 21st | 52% | 48% | David Valadao |
| 22nd | 40% | 60% | Devin Nunes |
| 23rd | 35% | 65% | Kevin McCarthy |
| 24th | 57% | 43% | Lois Capps |
| 25th | 43% | 57% | Steve Knight |
| 26th | 55% | 45% | Julia Brownley |
| 27th | 62% | 38% | Judy Chu |
| 28th | 71% | 29% | Adam Schiff |
| 29th | 74% | 26% | Tony Cárdenas |
| 30th | 64% | 36% | Brad Sherman |
| 31st | 52% | 48% | Pete Aguilar |
| 32nd | 60% | 40% | Grace Napolitano |
| 33rd | 62% | 38% | Ted Lieu |
| 34th | 84% | 16% | Xavier Becerra |
| 35th | 61% | 39% | Norma Torres |
| 36th | 53% | 47% | Raul Ruiz |
| 37th | 84% | 16% | Karen Bass |
| 38th | 60% | 40% | Linda Sánchez |
| 39th | 44% | 56% | Ed Royce |
| 40th | 76% | 24% | Lucille Roybal-Allard |
| 41st | 54% | 46% | Mark Takano |
| 42nd | 37% | 63% | Ken Calvert |
| 43rd | 73% | 27% | Maxine Waters |
| 44th | 80% | 20% | Janice Hahn |
| 45th | 41% | 59% | Mimi Walters |
| 46th | 59% | 41% | Loretta Sánchez |
| 47th | 57% | 43% | Alan Lowenthal |
| 48th | 42% | 58% | Dana Rohrabacher |
| 49th | 45% | 55% | Darrell Issa |
| 50th | 36% | 64% | Duncan Hunter |
| 51st | 66% | 34% | Juan Vargas |
| 52nd | 52% | 48% | Scott Peters |
| 53rd | 60% | 40% | Susan Davis |

==== By city ====
By municipality

Official outcome by city and unincorporated areas of counties, of which Brown won 340 & Kashkari won 199.
| City | County | Jerry Brown Democratic | | Neel Kashkari Republican | | Margin | | Total Votes | 2010 to 2014 Swing % |
| City | County | # | % | # | % | # | % | Total Votes | 2010 to 2014 Swing % |
|---|---|---|---|---|---|---|---|---|---|
| Alameda | Alameda | 18,435 | 83.91% | 3,536 | 16.09% | 14,899 | 67.81% | 21,971 | 15.07% |
| Albany | Alameda | 5,515 | 92.24% | 464 | 7.76% | 5,051 | 84.48% | 5,979 | 6.94% |
| Berkeley | Alameda | 36,828 | 95.32% | 1,807 | 4.68% | 35,021 | 90.65% | 38,635 | 5.82% |
| Dublin | Alameda | 7,204 | 68.43% | 3,324 | 31.57% | 3,880 | 36.85% | 10,528 | 20.27% |
| Emeryville | Alameda | 2,232 | 90.58% | 232 | 9.42% | 2,000 | 81.17% | 2,464 | 9.94% |
| Fremont | Alameda | 29,496 | 74.55% | 10,067 | 25.45% | 19,429 | 49.11% | 39,563 | 21.11% |
| Hayward | Alameda | 16,491 | 80.76% | 3,929 | 19.24% | 12,562 | 61.52% | 20,420 | 10.42% |
| Livermore | Alameda | 13,061 | 58.77% | 9,163 | 41.23% | 3,898 | 17.54% | 22,224 | 15.73% |
| Newark | Alameda | 5,946 | 75.58% | 1,921 | 24.42% | 4,025 | 51.16% | 7,867 | 15.92% |
| Oakland | Alameda | 95,407 | 93.44% | 6,702 | 6.56% | 88,705 | 86.87% | 102,109 | 6.81% |
| Piedmont | Alameda | 4,010 | 81.94% | 884 | 18.06% | 3,126 | 63.87% | 4,894 | 17.29% |
| Pleasanton | Alameda | 12,820 | 61.92% | 7,883 | 38.08% | 4,937 | 23.85% | 20,703 | 20.63% |
| San Leandro | Alameda | 13,818 | 80.94% | 3,254 | 19.06% | 10,564 | 61.88% | 17,072 | 12.84% |
| Union City | Alameda | 10,305 | 80.53% | 2,491 | 19.47% | 7,814 | 61.07% | 12,796 | 15.17% |
| Unincorporated Area | Alameda | 21,513 | 73.05% | 7,936 | 26.95% | 13,577 | 46.10% | 29,449 | 10.31% |
| Unincorporated Area | Alpine | 284 | 61.87% | 175 | 38.13% | 109 | 23.75% | 459 | 7.62% |
| Amador | Amador | 44 | 53.01% | 39 | 46.99% | 5 | 6.02% | 83 | 6.02% |
| Ione | Amador | 570 | 43.15% | 751 | 56.85% | -181 | -13.70% | 1,321 | -6.84% |
| Jackson | Amador | 702 | 49.30% | 722 | 50.70% | -20 | -1.40% | 1,424 | 8.12% |
| Plymouth | Amador | 104 | 45.41% | 125 | 54.59% | -21 | -9.17% | 229 | 2.76% |
| Sutter Creek | Amador | 474 | 49.48% | 484 | 50.52% | -10 | -1.04% | 958 | -2.26% |
| Unincorporated Area | Amador | 3,788 | 43.35% | 4,950 | 56.65% | -1,162 | -13.30% | 8,738 | -0.20% |
| Biggs | Butte | 137 | 42.95% | 182 | 57.05% | -45 | -14.11% | 319 | 1.16% |
| Chico | Butte | 12,401 | 57.65% | 9,111 | 42.35% | 3,290 | 15.29% | 21,512 | 4.39% |
| Gridley | Butte | 486 | 42.63% | 654 | 57.37% | -168 | -14.74% | 1,140 | -11.57% |
| Oroville | Butte | 1,355 | 45.47% | 1,625 | 54.53% | -270 | -9.06% | 2,980 | -2.43% |
| Paradise | Butte | 4,170 | 45.75% | 4,945 | 54.25% | -775 | -8.50% | 9,115 | 4.67% |
| Unincorporated Area | Butte | 10,971 | 41.09% | 15,732 | 58.91% | -4,761 | -17.83% | 26,703 | 0.94% |
| Angels | Calaveras | 614 | 46.52% | 706 | 53.48% | -92 | -6.97% | 1,320 | 8.18% |
| Unincorporated Area | Calaveras | 6,256 | 43.47% | 8,135 | 56.53% | -1,879 | -13.06% | 14,391 | 1.63% |
| Colusa | Colusa | 621 | 48.74% | 653 | 51.26% | -32 | -2.51% | 1,274 | 11.47% |
| Williams | Colusa | 359 | 61.90% | 221 | 38.10% | 138 | 23.79% | 580 | 19.69% |
| Unincorporated Area | Colusa | 809 | 34.68% | 1,524 | 65.32% | -715 | -30.65% | 2,333 | 2.22% |
| Antioch | Contra Costa | 11,727 | 68.32% | 5,439 | 31.68% | 6,288 | 36.63% | 17,166 | 4.99% |
| Brentwood | Contra Costa | 6,469 | 55.57% | 5,173 | 44.43% | 1,296 | 11.13% | 11,642 | 5.11% |
| Clayton | Contra Costa | 2,229 | 55.70% | 1,773 | 44.30% | 456 | 11.39% | 4,002 | 13.31% |
| Concord | Contra Costa | 17,156 | 67.04% | 8,436 | 32.96% | 8,720 | 34.07% | 25,592 | 10.31% |
| Danville | Contra Costa | 8,223 | 56.51% | 6,329 | 43.49% | 1,894 | 13.02% | 14,552 | 21.45% |
| El Cerrito | Contra Costa | 7,447 | 89.82% | 844 | 10.18% | 6,603 | 79.64% | 8,291 | 11.94% |
| Hercules | Contra Costa | 4,108 | 80.98% | 965 | 19.02% | 3,143 | 61.96% | 5,073 | 11.32% |
| Lafayette | Contra Costa | 6,269 | 66.98% | 3,091 | 33.02% | 3,178 | 33.95% | 9,360 | 18.13% |
| Martinez | Contra Costa | 7,487 | 68.54% | 3,436 | 31.46% | 4,051 | 37.09% | 10,923 | 7.36% |
| Moraga | Contra Costa | 3,962 | 64.60% | 2,171 | 35.40% | 1,791 | 29.20% | 6,133 | 20.50% |
| Oakley | Contra Costa | 3,449 | 59.05% | 2,392 | 40.95% | 1,057 | 18.10% | 5,841 | -0.48% |
| Orinda | Contra Costa | 5,543 | 68.46% | 2,554 | 31.54% | 2,989 | 36.91% | 8,097 | 20.00% |
| Pinole | Contra Costa | 3,590 | 76.04% | 1,131 | 23.96% | 2,459 | 52.09% | 4,721 | 9.78% |
| Pittsburg | Contra Costa | 7,443 | 77.89% | 2,113 | 22.11% | 5,330 | 55.78% | 9,556 | 4.24% |
| Pleasant Hill | Contra Costa | 6,702 | 69.91% | 2,884 | 30.09% | 3,818 | 39.83% | 9,586 | 12.49% |
| Richmond | Contra Costa | 17,912 | 89.52% | 2,096 | 10.48% | 15,816 | 79.05% | 20,008 | 6.98% |
| San Pablo | Contra Costa | 2,466 | 88.83% | 310 | 11.17% | 2,156 | 77.67% | 2,776 | 10.76% |
| San Ramon | Contra Costa | 9,859 | 63.08% | 5,771 | 36.92% | 4,088 | 26.15% | 15,630 | 21.19% |
| Walnut Creek | Contra Costa | 15,963 | 67.67% | 7,625 | 32.33% | 8,338 | 35.35% | 23,588 | 16.86% |
| Unincorporated Area | Contra Costa | 26,399 | 63.57% | 15,127 | 36.43% | 11,272 | 27.14% | 41,526 | 10.38% |
| Crescent City | Del Norte | 459 | 56.53% | 353 | 43.47% | 106 | 13.05% | 812 | -7.05% |
| Unincorporated Area | Del Norte | 3,029 | 48.74% | 3,186 | 51.26% | -157 | -2.53% | 6,215 | -9.76% |
| Placerville | El Dorado | 1,533 | 52.92% | 1,364 | 47.08% | 169 | 5.83% | 2,897 | 7.89% |
| South Lake Tahoe | El Dorado | 2,454 | 65.76% | 1,278 | 34.24% | 1,176 | 31.51% | 3,732 | 11.01% |
| Unincorporated Area | El Dorado | 23,929 | 43.72% | 30,801 | 56.28% | -6,872 | -12.56% | 54,730 | 8.38% |
| Clovis | Fresno | 8,256 | 36.18% | 14,563 | 63.82% | -6,307 | -27.64% | 22,819 | 5.72% |
| Coalinga | Fresno | 837 | 44.93% | 1,026 | 55.07% | -189 | -10.14% | 1,863 | -13.22% |
| Firebaugh | Fresno | 470 | 66.01% | 242 | 33.99% | 228 | 32.02% | 712 | 5.21% |
| Fowler | Fresno | 567 | 54.84% | 467 | 45.16% | 100 | 9.67% | 1,034 | 6.49% |
| Fresno | Fresno | 41,171 | 53.89% | 35,223 | 46.11% | 5,948 | 7.79% | 76,394 | -32.53% |
| Huron | Fresno | 292 | 84.15% | 55 | 15.85% | 237 | 68.30% | 347 | 2.08% |
| Kerman | Fresno | 1,083 | 56.20% | 844 | 43.80% | 239 | 12.40% | 1,927 | 4.25% |
| Kingsburg | Fresno | 799 | 27.26% | 2,132 | 72.74% | -1,333 | -45.48% | 2,931 | -4.40% |
| Mendota | Fresno | 612 | 83.15% | 124 | 16.85% | 488 | 66.30% | 736 | 5.68% |
| Orange Cove | Fresno | 955 | 81.76% | 213 | 18.24% | 742 | 63.53% | 1,168 | 7.59% |
| Parlier | Fresno | 1,296 | 86.52% | 202 | 13.48% | 1,094 | 73.03% | 1,498 | 8.32% |
| Reedley | Fresno | 1,603 | 44.07% | 2,034 | 55.93% | -431 | -11.85% | 3,637 | 0.11% |
| San Joaquin | Fresno | 227 | 79.65% | 58 | 20.35% | 169 | 59.30% | 285 | 5.45% |
| Sanger | Fresno | 2,339 | 61.93% | 1,438 | 38.07% | 901 | 23.85% | 3,777 | 3.89% |
| Selma | Fresno | 2,026 | 59.24% | 1,394 | 40.76% | 632 | 18.48% | 3,420 | 9.02% |
| Unincorporated Area | Fresno | 13,610 | 36.45% | 23,729 | 63.55% | -10,119 | -27.10% | 37,339 | 2.00% |
| Orland | Glenn | 520 | 41.53% | 732 | 58.47% | -212 | -16.93% | 1,252 | 2.50% |
| Willows | Glenn | 498 | 40.19% | 741 | 59.81% | -243 | -19.61% | 1,239 | 6.38% |
| Unincorporated Area | Glenn | 1,031 | 29.75% | 2,435 | 70.25% | -1,404 | -40.51% | 3,466 | -3.80% |
| Arcata | Humboldt | 3,615 | 84.01% | 688 | 15.99% | 2,927 | 68.02% | 4,303 | 11.16% |
| Blue Lake | Humboldt | 298 | 70.95% | 122 | 29.05% | 176 | 41.90% | 420 | 9.99% |
| Eureka | Humboldt | 4,712 | 66.19% | 2,407 | 33.81% | 2,305 | 32.38% | 7,119 | 11.16% |
| Ferndale | Humboldt | 310 | 55.46% | 249 | 44.54% | 61 | 10.91% | 559 | 13.22% |
| Fortuna | Humboldt | 1,520 | 49.75% | 1,535 | 50.25% | -15 | -0.49% | 3,055 | 11.11% |
| Rio Dell | Humboldt | 335 | 46.08% | 392 | 53.92% | -57 | -7.84% | 727 | 3.70% |
| Trinidad | Humboldt | 117 | 80.69% | 28 | 19.31% | 89 | 61.38% | 145 | 12.38% |
| Unincorporated Area | Humboldt | 13,096 | 62.90% | 7,725 | 37.10% | 5,371 | 25.80% | 20,821 | 9.04% |
| Brawley | Imperial | 1,870 | 59.61% | 1,267 | 40.39% | 603 | 19.22% | 3,137 | -4.34% |
| Calexico | Imperial | 4,205 | 86.77% | 641 | 13.23% | 3,564 | 73.55% | 4,846 | 5.69% |
| Calipatria | Imperial | 226 | 69.97% | 97 | 30.03% | 129 | 39.94% | 323 | -6.89% |
| El Centro | Imperial | 3,516 | 63.40% | 2,030 | 36.60% | 1,486 | 26.79% | 5,546 | 2.01% |
| Holtville | Imperial | 444 | 57.51% | 328 | 42.49% | 116 | 15.03% | 772 | 7.09% |
| Imperial | Imperial | 1,030 | 51.29% | 978 | 48.71% | 52 | 2.59% | 2,008 | -8.92% |
| Westmorland | Imperial | 171 | 66.02% | 88 | 33.98% | 83 | 32.05% | 259 | 3.26% |
| Unincorporated Area | Imperial | 1,995 | 49.26% | 2,055 | 50.74% | -60 | -1.48% | 4,050 | 2.68% |
| Bishop | Inyo | 444 | 50.06% | 443 | 49.94% | 1 | 0.11% | 887 | -5.33% |
| Unincorporated Area | Inyo | 1,873 | 41.24% | 2,669 | 58.76% | -796 | -17.53% | 4,542 | -9.76% |
| Arvin | Kern | 1,122 | 81.30% | 258 | 18.70% | 864 | 62.61% | 1,380 | 15.63% |
| Bakersfield | Kern | 25,326 | 43.30% | 33,157 | 56.70% | -7,831 | -13.39% | 58,483 | 4.17% |
| California City | Kern | 880 | 36.96% | 1,501 | 63.04% | -621 | -26.08% | 2,381 | -6.24% |
| Delano | Kern | 3,332 | 76.09% | 1,047 | 23.91% | 2,285 | 52.18% | 4,379 | 3.16% |
| Maricopa | Kern | 43 | 22.99% | 144 | 77.01% | -101 | -54.01% | 187 | -8.43% |
| McFarland | Kern | 764 | 74.54% | 261 | 25.46% | 503 | 49.07% | 1,025 | 2.99% |
| Ridgecrest | Kern | 2,019 | 31.06% | 4,482 | 68.94% | -2,463 | -37.89% | 6,501 | -1.77% |
| Shafter | Kern | 910 | 51.01% | 874 | 48.99% | 36 | 2.02% | 1,784 | -3.56% |
| Taft | Kern | 290 | 22.14% | 1,020 | 77.86% | -730 | -55.73% | 1,310 | -8.38% |
| Tehachapi | Kern | 662 | 34.81% | 1,240 | 65.19% | -578 | -30.39% | 1,902 | -14.72% |
| Wasco | Kern | 1,330 | 63.24% | 773 | 36.76% | 557 | 26.49% | 2,103 | 4.37% |
| Unincorporated Area | Kern | 17,591 | 34.32% | 33,660 | 65.68% | -16,069 | -31.35% | 51,251 | -4.14% |
| Avenal | Kings | 400 | 68.61% | 183 | 31.39% | 217 | 37.22% | 583 | 6.50% |
| Corcoran | Kings | 959 | 61.40% | 603 | 38.60% | 356 | 22.79% | 1,562 | -7.88% |
| Hanford | Kings | 4,284 | 40.13% | 6,392 | 59.87% | -2,108 | -19.75% | 10,676 | -8.58% |
| Lemoore | Kings | 1,553 | 38.22% | 2,510 | 61.78% | -957 | -23.55% | 4,063 | -9.95% |
| Unincorporated Area | Kings | 1,556 | 28.59% | 3,887 | 71.41% | -2,331 | -42.83% | 5,443 | -12.48% |
| Clearlake | Lake | 1,889 | 67.95% | 891 | 32.05% | 998 | 35.90% | 2,780 | 10.90% |
| Lakeport | Lake | 879 | 60.50% | 574 | 39.50% | 305 | 20.99% | 1,453 | 12.81% |
| Unincorporated Area | Lake | 7,954 | 59.97% | 5,310 | 40.03% | 2,644 | 19.93% | 13,264 | 10.05% |
| Susanville | Lassen | 794 | 40.26% | 1,178 | 59.74% | -384 | -19.47% | 1,972 | -26.22% |
| Unincorporated Area | Lassen | 1,419 | 29.26% | 3,431 | 70.74% | -2,012 | -41.48% | 4,850 | -26.82% |
| Agoura Hills | Los Angeles | 3,115 | 54.18% | 2,634 | 45.82% | 481 | 8.37% | 5,749 | 11.34% |
| Alhambra | Los Angeles | 7,471 | 70.92% | 3,064 | 29.08% | 4,407 | 41.83% | 10,535 | 7.96% |
| Arcadia | Los Angeles | 4,614 | 50.26% | 4,567 | 49.74% | 47 | 0.51% | 9,181 | 14.54% |
| Artesia | Los Angeles | 1,297 | 60.69% | 840 | 39.31% | 457 | 21.39% | 2,137 | 5.89% |
| Avalon | Los Angeles | 313 | 51.06% | 300 | 48.94% | 13 | 2.12% | 613 | 1.20% |
| Azusa | Los Angeles | 3,017 | 60.44% | 1,975 | 39.56% | 1,042 | 20.87% | 4,992 | -7.57% |
| Baldwin Park | Los Angeles | 4,904 | 76.55% | 1,502 | 23.45% | 3,402 | 53.11% | 6,406 | -0.93% |
| Bell | Los Angeles | 1,860 | 81.29% | 428 | 18.71% | 1,432 | 62.59% | 2,288 | -1.77% |
| Bell Gardens | Los Angeles | 1,898 | 83.39% | 378 | 16.61% | 1,520 | 66.78% | 2,276 | 0.80% |
| Bellflower | Los Angeles | 4,835 | 60.32% | 3,180 | 39.68% | 1,655 | 20.65% | 8,015 | -4.09% |
| Beverly Hills | Los Angeles | 4,529 | 61.08% | 2,886 | 38.92% | 1,643 | 22.16% | 7,415 | 10.05% |
| Bradbury | Los Angeles | 80 | 35.56% | 145 | 64.44% | -65 | -28.89% | 225 | 5.50% |
| Burbank | Los Angeles | 12,395 | 63.37% | 7,165 | 36.63% | 5,230 | 26.74% | 19,560 | 8.64% |
| Calabasas | Los Angeles | 3,308 | 56.77% | 2,519 | 43.23% | 789 | 13.54% | 5,827 | 11.09% |
| Carson | Los Angeles | 12,189 | 78.56% | 3,327 | 21.44% | 8,862 | 57.12% | 15,516 | 1.87% |
| Cerritos | Los Angeles | 6,420 | 57.16% | 4,812 | 42.84% | 1,608 | 14.32% | 11,232 | 8.14% |
| Claremont | Los Angeles | 6,980 | 65.28% | 3,713 | 34.72% | 3,267 | 30.55% | 10,693 | 10.78% |
| Commerce | Los Angeles | 1,219 | 81.27% | 281 | 18.73% | 938 | 62.53% | 1,500 | 0.46% |
| Compton | Los Angeles | 9,126 | 90.34% | 976 | 9.66% | 8,150 | 80.68% | 10,102 | -6.31% |
| Covina | Los Angeles | 3,762 | 51.19% | 3,587 | 48.81% | 175 | 2.38% | 7,349 | -5.21% |
| Cudahy | Los Angeles | 1,069 | 86.35% | 169 | 13.65% | 900 | 72.70% | 1,238 | 6.16% |
| Culver City | Los Angeles | 8,201 | 77.92% | 2,324 | 22.08% | 5,877 | 55.84% | 10,525 | 6.15% |
| Diamond Bar | Los Angeles | 4,867 | 52.79% | 4,353 | 47.21% | 514 | 5.57% | 9,220 | 6.72% |
| Downey | Los Angeles | 9,308 | 59.33% | 6,381 | 40.67% | 2,927 | 18.66% | 15,689 | -1.53% |
| Duarte | Los Angeles | 2,252 | 60.29% | 1,483 | 39.71% | 769 | 20.59% | 3,735 | -3.35% |
| El Monte | Los Angeles | 5,626 | 74.25% | 1,951 | 25.75% | 3,675 | 48.50% | 7,577 | 2.16% |
| El Segundo | Los Angeles | 2,255 | 49.32% | 2,317 | 50.68% | -62 | -1.36% | 4,572 | 6.93% |
| Gardena | Los Angeles | 6,955 | 76.19% | 2,173 | 23.81% | 4,782 | 52.39% | 9,128 | 0.46% |
| Glendale | Los Angeles | 17,604 | 64.45% | 9,709 | 35.55% | 7,895 | 28.91% | 27,313 | 11.34% |
| Glendora | Los Angeles | 4,301 | 38.49% | 6,873 | 61.51% | -2,572 | -23.02% | 11,174 | -2.56% |
| Hawaiian Gardens | Los Angeles | 704 | 70.47% | 295 | 29.53% | 409 | 40.94% | 999 | -5.98% |
| Hawthorne | Los Angeles | 6,804 | 75.63% | 2,193 | 24.37% | 4,611 | 51.25% | 8,997 | -0.25% |
| Hermosa Beach | Los Angeles | 3,574 | 57.61% | 2,630 | 42.39% | 944 | 15.22% | 6,204 | 14.72% |
| Hidden Hills | Los Angeles | 279 | 46.27% | 324 | 53.73% | -45 | -7.46% | 603 | 17.29% |
| Huntington Park | Los Angeles | 2,986 | 85.19% | 519 | 14.81% | 2,467 | 70.39% | 3,505 | 1.88% |
| Industry | Los Angeles | 9 | 21.43% | 33 | 78.57% | -24 | -57.14% | 42 | -35.71% |
| Inglewood | Los Angeles | 14,895 | 90.21% | 1,616 | 9.79% | 13,279 | 80.43% | 16,511 | -1.32% |
| Irwindale | Los Angeles | 147 | 68.69% | 67 | 31.31% | 80 | 37.38% | 214 | -10.92% |
| La Canada Flintridge | Los Angeles | 3,288 | 48.04% | 3,557 | 51.96% | -269 | -3.93% | 6,845 | 15.14% |
| La Habra Heights | Los Angeles | 606 | 35.86% | 1,084 | 64.14% | -478 | -28.28% | 1,690 | 8.28% |
| La Mirada | Los Angeles | 4,173 | 45.52% | 4,995 | 54.48% | -822 | -8.97% | 9,168 | -0.81% |
| La Puente | Los Angeles | 2,718 | 75.54% | 880 | 24.46% | 1,838 | 51.08% | 3,598 | -2.71% |
| La Verne | Los Angeles | 3,587 | 45.13% | 4,361 | 54.87% | -774 | -9.74% | 7,948 | 3.13% |
| Lakewood | Los Angeles | 8,300 | 52.56% | 7,491 | 47.44% | 809 | 5.12% | 15,791 | 0.01% |
| Lancaster | Los Angeles | 10,102 | 45.78% | 11,963 | 54.22% | -1,861 | -8.43% | 22,065 | -4.29% |
| Lawndale | Los Angeles | 2,061 | 67.68% | 984 | 32.32% | 1,077 | 35.37% | 3,045 | -1.56% |
| Lomita | Los Angeles | 1,970 | 50.41% | 1,938 | 49.59% | 32 | 0.82% | 3,908 | -1.63% |
| Long Beach | Los Angeles | 46,186 | 65.22% | 24,634 | 34.78% | 21,552 | 30.43% | 70,820 | 2.12% |
| Los Angeles | Los Angeles | 398,522 | 75.17% | 131,666 | 24.83% | 266,856 | 50.33% | 530,188 | 5.51% |
| Lynwood | Los Angeles | 4,003 | 86.48% | 626 | 13.52% | 3,377 | 72.95% | 4,629 | 1.40% |
| Malibu | Los Angeles | 2,846 | 62.22% | 1,728 | 37.78% | 1,118 | 24.44% | 4,574 | 17.45% |
| Manhattan Beach | Los Angeles | 5,899 | 51.02% | 5,664 | 48.98% | 235 | 2.03% | 11,563 | 10.81% |
| Maywood | Los Angeles | 1,521 | 87.11% | 225 | 12.89% | 1,296 | 74.23% | 1,746 | 2.81% |
| Monrovia | Los Angeles | 4,006 | 55.78% | 3,176 | 44.22% | 830 | 11.56% | 7,182 | 3.49% |
| Montebello | Los Angeles | 5,258 | 74.22% | 1,826 | 25.78% | 3,432 | 48.45% | 7,084 | -1.86% |
| Monterey Park | Los Angeles | 4,843 | 69.79% | 2,096 | 30.21% | 2,747 | 39.59% | 6,939 | 11.32% |
| Norwalk | Los Angeles | 7,673 | 66.67% | 3,836 | 33.33% | 3,837 | 33.34% | 11,509 | -2.03% |
| Palmdale | Los Angeles | 10,517 | 53.10% | 9,289 | 46.90% | 1,228 | 6.20% | 19,806 | -1.94% |
| Palos Verdes Estates | Los Angeles | 2,111 | 41.41% | 2,987 | 58.59% | -876 | -17.18% | 5,098 | 14.29% |
| Paramount | Los Angeles | 2,955 | 78.40% | 814 | 21.60% | 2,141 | 56.81% | 3,769 | -1.51% |
| Pasadena | Los Angeles | 20,390 | 70.53% | 8,519 | 29.47% | 11,871 | 41.06% | 28,909 | 8.23% |
| Pico Rivera | Los Angeles | 5,366 | 74.83% | 1,805 | 25.17% | 3,561 | 49.66% | 7,171 | -5.81% |
| Pomona | Los Angeles | 9,799 | 68.04% | 4,603 | 31.96% | 5,196 | 36.08% | 14,402 | -3.31% |
| Rancho Palos Verdes | Los Angeles | 5,949 | 45.80% | 7,041 | 54.20% | -1,092 | -8.41% | 12,990 | 8.85% |
| Redondo Beach | Los Angeles | 9,680 | 55.78% | 7,673 | 44.22% | 2,007 | 11.57% | 17,353 | 7.53% |
| Rolling Hills | Los Angeles | 213 | 27.41% | 564 | 72.59% | -351 | -45.17% | 777 | 7.13% |
| Rolling Hills Estates | Los Angeles | 1,195 | 41.31% | 1,698 | 58.69% | -503 | -17.39% | 2,893 | 10.89% |
| Rosemead | Los Angeles | 3,062 | 73.17% | 1,123 | 26.83% | 1,939 | 46.33% | 4,185 | 7.65% |
| San Dimas | Los Angeles | 3,290 | 43.91% | 4,203 | 56.09% | -913 | -12.18% | 7,493 | 0.49% |
| San Fernando | Los Angeles | 1,836 | 77.08% | 546 | 22.92% | 1,290 | 54.16% | 2,382 | 2.75% |
| San Gabriel | Los Angeles | 2,893 | 63.71% | 1,648 | 36.29% | 1,245 | 27.42% | 4,541 | 8.68% |
| San Marino | Los Angeles | 1,601 | 46.79% | 1,821 | 53.21% | -220 | -6.43% | 3,422 | 21.32% |
| Santa Clarita | Los Angeles | 16,909 | 41.25% | 24,084 | 58.75% | -7,175 | -17.50% | 40,993 | 0.66% |
| Santa Fe Springs | Los Angeles | 1,557 | 65.48% | 821 | 34.52% | 736 | 30.95% | 2,378 | -5.67% |
| Santa Monica | Los Angeles | 21,270 | 78.05% | 5,981 | 21.95% | 15,289 | 56.10% | 27,251 | 8.66% |
| Sierra Madre | Los Angeles | 2,202 | 57.58% | 1,622 | 42.42% | 580 | 15.17% | 3,824 | 11.57% |
| Signal Hill | Los Angeles | 1,328 | 67.00% | 654 | 33.00% | 674 | 34.01% | 1,982 | 5.82% |
| South El Monte | Los Angeles | 1,224 | 80.58% | 295 | 19.42% | 929 | 61.16% | 1,519 | 3.67% |
| South Gate | Los Angeles | 5,824 | 81.10% | 1,357 | 18.90% | 4,467 | 62.21% | 7,181 | 2.65% |
| South Pasadena | Los Angeles | 5,072 | 72.44% | 1,930 | 27.56% | 3,142 | 44.87% | 7,002 | 14.28% |
| Temple City | Los Angeles | 2,903 | 56.18% | 2,264 | 43.82% | 639 | 12.37% | 5,167 | 7.82% |
| Torrance | Los Angeles | 16,745 | 49.88% | 16,826 | 50.12% | -81 | -0.24% | 33,571 | 5.27% |
| Vernon | Los Angeles | 15 | 68.18% | 7 | 31.82% | 8 | 36.36% | 22 | 49.26% |
| Walnut | Los Angeles | 2,835 | 57.33% | 2,110 | 42.67% | 725 | 14.66% | 4,945 | 12.33% |
| West Covina | Los Angeles | 8,171 | 59.81% | 5,490 | 40.19% | 2,681 | 19.63% | 13,661 | -1.36% |
| West Hollywood | Los Angeles | 7,307 | 85.40% | 1,249 | 14.60% | 6,058 | 70.80% | 8,556 | 9.36% |
| Westlake Village | Los Angeles | 1,362 | 47.21% | 1,523 | 52.79% | -161 | -5.58% | 2,885 | 11.18% |
| Whittier | Los Angeles | 7,837 | 53.88% | 6,709 | 46.12% | 1,128 | 7.75% | 14,546 | -1.87% |
| Unincorporated Area | Los Angeles | 91,994 | 64.11% | 51,511 | 35.89% | 40,483 | 28.21% | 143,505 | 0.00% |
| Chowchilla | Madera | 643 | 33.28% | 1,289 | 66.72% | -646 | -33.44% | 1,932 | -10.62% |
| Madera | Madera | 3,183 | 50.17% | 3,162 | 49.83% | 21 | 0.33% | 6,345 | -9.09% |
| Unincorporated Area | Madera | 6,148 | 33.19% | 12,374 | 66.81% | -6,226 | -33.61% | 18,522 | -3.56% |
| Belvedere | Marin | 603 | 65.90% | 312 | 34.10% | 291 | 31.80% | 915 | 29.36% |
| Corte Madera | Marin | 2,813 | 81.32% | 646 | 18.68% | 2,167 | 62.65% | 3,459 | 16.30% |
| Fairfax | Marin | 2,933 | 91.00% | 290 | 9.00% | 2,643 | 82.00% | 3,223 | 7.74% |
| Larkspur | Marin | 3,916 | 80.05% | 976 | 19.95% | 2,940 | 60.10% | 4,892 | 15.86% |
| Mill Valley | Marin | 4,719 | 85.44% | 804 | 14.56% | 3,915 | 70.89% | 5,523 | 12.21% |
| Novato | Marin | 11,896 | 73.67% | 4,251 | 26.33% | 7,645 | 47.35% | 16,147 | 17.71% |
| Ross | Marin | 721 | 67.57% | 346 | 32.43% | 375 | 35.15% | 1,067 | 27.07% |
| San Anselmo | Marin | 4,296 | 86.42% | 675 | 13.58% | 3,621 | 72.84% | 4,971 | 10.56% |
| San Rafael | Marin | 13,450 | 80.30% | 3,299 | 19.70% | 10,151 | 60.61% | 16,749 | 15.95% |
| Sausalito | Marin | 2,442 | 79.83% | 617 | 20.17% | 1,825 | 59.66% | 3,059 | 16.37% |
| Tiburon | Marin | 2,383 | 72.21% | 917 | 27.79% | 1,466 | 44.42% | 3,300 | 22.70% |
| Unincorporated Area | Marin | 19,579 | 79.61% | 5,014 | 20.39% | 14,565 | 59.22% | 24,593 | 14.13% |
| Unincorporated Area | Mariposa | 2,499 | 38.23% | 4,038 | 61.77% | -1,539 | -23.54% | 6,537 | -6.09% |
| Fort Bragg | Mendocino | 1,341 | 74.75% | 453 | 25.25% | 888 | 49.50% | 1,794 | 8.50% |
| Point Arena | Mendocino | 100 | 90.91% | 10 | 9.09% | 90 | 81.82% | 110 | 21.01% |
| Ukiah | Mendocino | 2,479 | 70.69% | 1,028 | 29.31% | 1,451 | 41.37% | 3,507 | 12.78% |
| Willits | Mendocino | 828 | 73.99% | 291 | 26.01% | 537 | 47.99% | 1,119 | 13.93% |
| Unincorporated Area | Mendocino | 12,592 | 71.40% | 5,043 | 28.60% | 7,549 | 42.81% | 17,635 | 9.31% |
| Atwater | Merced | 1,927 | 44.69% | 2,385 | 55.31% | -458 | -10.62% | 4,312 | -4.69% |
| Dos Palos | Merced | 327 | 44.19% | 413 | 55.81% | -86 | -11.62% | 740 | 0.33% |
| Gustine | Merced | 510 | 54.37% | 428 | 45.63% | 82 | 8.74% | 938 | 8.41% |
| Livingston | Merced | 1,063 | 75.77% | 340 | 24.23% | 723 | 51.53% | 1,403 | -1.46% |
| Los Banos | Merced | 2,836 | 56.73% | 2,163 | 43.27% | 673 | 13.46% | 4,999 | 1.26% |
| Merced | Merced | 6,394 | 55.66% | 5,093 | 44.34% | 1,301 | 11.33% | 11,487 | 5.16% |
| Unincorporated Area | Merced | 5,888 | 42.32% | 8,026 | 57.68% | -2,138 | -15.37% | 13,914 | 4.64% |
| Alturas | Modoc | 229 | 32.62% | 473 | 67.38% | -244 | -34.76% | 702 | -12.36% |
| Unincorporated Area | Modoc | 541 | 25.41% | 1,588 | 74.59% | -1,047 | -49.18% | 2,129 | -5.16% |
| Mammoth Lakes | Mono | 792 | 60.18% | 524 | 39.82% | 268 | 20.36% | 1,316 | 10.15% |
| Unincorporated Area | Mono | 840 | 47.78% | 918 | 52.22% | -78 | -4.44% | 1,758 | 5.84% |
| Carmel-by-the-Sea | Monterey | 938 | 65.78% | 488 | 34.22% | 450 | 31.56% | 1,426 | 21.14% |
| Del Rey Oaks | Monterey | 426 | 72.95% | 158 | 27.05% | 268 | 45.89% | 584 | 21.24% |
| Gonzales | Monterey | 729 | 79.93% | 183 | 20.07% | 546 | 59.87% | 912 | 8.43% |
| Greenfield | Monterey | 1,191 | 81.74% | 266 | 18.26% | 925 | 63.49% | 1,457 | 3.21% |
| King City | Monterey | 719 | 67.26% | 350 | 32.74% | 369 | 34.52% | 1,069 | 2.65% |
| Marina | Monterey | 2,912 | 72.31% | 1,115 | 27.69% | 1,797 | 44.62% | 4,027 | 16.25% |
| Monterey | Monterey | 5,058 | 73.70% | 1,805 | 26.30% | 3,253 | 47.40% | 6,863 | 18.25% |
| Pacific Grove | Monterey | 4,257 | 76.10% | 1,337 | 23.90% | 2,920 | 52.20% | 5,594 | 16.91% |
| Salinas | Monterey | 13,339 | 73.01% | 4,931 | 26.99% | 8,408 | 46.02% | 18,270 | 10.61% |
| Sand City | Monterey | 54 | 69.23% | 24 | 30.77% | 30 | 38.46% | 78 | 14.32% |
| Seaside | Monterey | 3,754 | 78.57% | 1,024 | 21.43% | 2,730 | 57.14% | 4,778 | 17.34% |
| Soledad | Monterey | 1,183 | 81.47% | 269 | 18.53% | 914 | 62.95% | 1,452 | -0.14% |
| Unincorporated Area | Monterey | 16,755 | 61.16% | 10,641 | 38.84% | 6,114 | 22.32% | 27,396 | 16.50% |
| American Canyon | Napa | 2,704 | 75.83% | 862 | 24.17% | 1,842 | 51.65% | 3,566 | 15.39% |
| Calistoga | Napa | 1,013 | 76.74% | 307 | 23.26% | 706 | 53.48% | 1,320 | 20.13% |
| Napa | Napa | 14,586 | 69.38% | 6,436 | 30.62% | 8,150 | 38.77% | 21,022 | 16.48% |
| St. Helena | Napa | 1,390 | 72.28% | 533 | 27.72% | 857 | 44.57% | 1,923 | 26.07% |
| Yountville | Napa | 894 | 71.92% | 349 | 28.08% | 545 | 43.85% | 1,243 | 17.96% |
| Unincorporated Area | Napa | 5,259 | 59.55% | 3,572 | 40.45% | 1,687 | 19.10% | 8,831 | 17.75% |
| Grass Valley | Nevada | 2,233 | 60.75% | 1,443 | 39.25% | 790 | 21.49% | 3,676 | 13.06% |
| Nevada City | Nevada | 1,062 | 77.18% | 314 | 22.82% | 748 | 54.36% | 1,376 | 17.06% |
| Truckee | Nevada | 3,100 | 67.91% | 1,465 | 32.09% | 1,635 | 35.82% | 4,565 | 21.30% |
| Unincorporated Area | Nevada | 14,581 | 50.67% | 14,197 | 49.33% | 384 | 1.33% | 28,778 | 11.76% |
| Aliso Viejo | Orange | 3,987 | 45.01% | 4,872 | 54.99% | -885 | -9.99% | 8,859 | 8.93% |
| Anaheim | Orange | 23,479 | 49.72% | 23,747 | 50.28% | -268 | -0.57% | 47,226 | 6.89% |
| Brea | Orange | 3,807 | 37.66% | 6,301 | 62.34% | -2,494 | -24.67% | 10,108 | 4.84% |
| Buena Park | Orange | 6,209 | 50.25% | 6,147 | 49.75% | 62 | 0.50% | 12,356 | 2.94% |
| Costa Mesa | Orange | 9,190 | 45.53% | 10,994 | 54.47% | -1,804 | -8.94% | 20,184 | 5.88% |
| Cypress | Orange | 5,011 | 44.04% | 6,367 | 55.96% | -1,356 | -11.92% | 11,378 | 5.12% |
| Dana Point | Orange | 4,031 | 39.78% | 6,102 | 60.22% | -2,071 | -20.44% | 10,133 | 6.04% |
| Fountain Valley | Orange | 6,262 | 40.78% | 9,094 | 59.22% | -2,832 | -18.44% | 15,356 | 9.52% |
| Fullerton | Orange | 12,724 | 46.50% | 14,638 | 53.50% | -1,914 | -7.00% | 27,362 | 8.74% |
| Garden Grove | Orange | 14,958 | 52.58% | 13,488 | 47.42% | 1,470 | 5.17% | 28,446 | 13.09% |
| Huntington Beach | Orange | 20,802 | 39.93% | 31,293 | 60.07% | -10,491 | -20.14% | 52,095 | 5.72% |
| Irvine | Orange | 21,751 | 51.70% | 20,320 | 48.30% | 1,431 | 3.40% | 42,071 | 12.25% |
| La Habra | Orange | 3,901 | 44.74% | 4,819 | 55.26% | -918 | -10.53% | 8,720 | -0.30% |
| La Palma | Orange | 1,708 | 47.44% | 1,892 | 52.56% | -184 | -5.11% | 3,600 | 6.07% |
| Laguna Beach | Orange | 4,755 | 55.70% | 3,782 | 44.30% | 973 | 11.40% | 8,537 | 7.46% |
| Laguna Hills | Orange | 2,847 | 38.12% | 4,622 | 61.88% | -1,775 | -23.76% | 7,469 | 4.94% |
| Laguna Niguel | Orange | 6,978 | 40.09% | 10,429 | 59.91% | -3,451 | -19.83% | 17,407 | 9.63% |
| Laguna Woods | Orange | 4,431 | 53.41% | 3,865 | 46.59% | 566 | 6.82% | 8,296 | 9.21% |
| Lake Forest | Orange | 6,555 | 38.50% | 10,472 | 61.50% | -3,917 | -23.00% | 17,027 | 7.23% |
| Los Alamitos | Orange | 1,150 | 43.96% | 1,466 | 56.04% | -316 | -12.08% | 2,616 | -0.09% |
| Mission Viejo | Orange | 9,494 | 37.75% | 15,658 | 62.25% | -6,164 | -24.51% | 25,152 | 7.57% |
| Newport Beach | Orange | 9,162 | 33.07% | 18,544 | 66.93% | -9,382 | -33.86% | 27,706 | 8.63% |
| Orange | Orange | 11,406 | 40.00% | 17,110 | 60.00% | -5,704 | -20.00% | 28,516 | 5.36% |
| Placentia | Orange | 4,205 | 39.05% | 6,564 | 60.95% | -2,359 | -21.91% | 10,769 | 5.27% |
| Rancho Santa Margarita | Orange | 4,196 | 36.88% | 7,181 | 63.12% | -2,985 | -26.24% | 11,377 | 9.81% |
| San Clemente | Orange | 6,381 | 36.72% | 10,997 | 63.28% | -4,616 | -26.56% | 17,378 | 6.76% |
| San Juan Capistrano | Orange | 3,317 | 36.19% | 5,849 | 63.81% | -2,532 | -27.62% | 9,166 | 3.84% |
| Santa Ana | Orange | 24,120 | 68.67% | 11,005 | 31.33% | 13,115 | 37.34% | 35,125 | 11.32% |
| Seal Beach | Orange | 4,584 | 46.05% | 5,370 | 53.95% | -786 | -7.90% | 9,954 | 7.80% |
| Stanton | Orange | 2,732 | 57.47% | 2,022 | 42.53% | 710 | 14.93% | 4,754 | 11.58% |
| Tustin | Orange | 5,177 | 45.56% | 6,185 | 54.44% | -1,008 | -8.87% | 11,362 | 7.65% |
| Villa Park | Orange | 619 | 24.68% | 1,889 | 75.32% | -1,270 | -50.64% | 2,508 | 6.55% |
| Westminster | Orange | 9,125 | 51.17% | 8,706 | 48.83% | 419 | 2.35% | 17,831 | 16.58% |
| Yorba Linda | Orange | 5,799 | 29.91% | 13,587 | 70.09% | -7,788 | -40.17% | 19,386 | 5.90% |
| Unincorporated Area | Orange | 10,854 | 35.83% | 19,440 | 64.17% | -8,586 | -28.34% | 30,294 | 8.26% |
| Auburn | Placer | 2,635 | 52.09% | 2,424 | 47.91% | 211 | 4.17% | 5,059 | 10.55% |
| Colfax | Placer | 216 | 46.25% | 251 | 53.75% | -35 | -7.49% | 467 | -3.12% |
| Lincoln | Placer | 6,914 | 45.76% | 8,196 | 54.24% | -1,282 | -8.48% | 15,110 | 10.51% |
| Loomis | Placer | 839 | 37.57% | 1,394 | 62.43% | -555 | -24.85% | 2,233 | 1.18% |
| Rocklin | Placer | 7,059 | 44.73% | 8,723 | 55.27% | -1,664 | -10.54% | 15,782 | 9.09% |
| Roseville | Placer | 16,562 | 48.13% | 17,849 | 51.87% | -1,287 | -3.74% | 34,411 | 10.69% |
| Unincorporated Area | Placer | 17,016 | 42.77% | 22,767 | 57.23% | -5,751 | -14.46% | 39,783 | 8.98% |
| Portola | Plumas | 232 | 47.15% | 260 | 52.85% | -28 | -5.69% | 492 | 5.42% |
| Unincorporated Area | Plumas | 2,734 | 41.34% | 3,879 | 58.66% | -1,145 | -17.31% | 6,613 | 2.01% |
| Banning | Riverside | 3,005 | 45.59% | 3,587 | 54.41% | -582 | -8.83% | 6,592 | -0.15% |
| Beaumont | Riverside | 3,236 | 45.39% | 3,893 | 54.61% | -657 | -9.22% | 7,129 | 3.39% |
| Blythe | Riverside | 979 | 52.41% | 889 | 47.59% | 90 | 4.82% | 1,868 | -25.77% |
| Calimesa | Riverside | 657 | 33.71% | 1,292 | 66.29% | -635 | -32.58% | 1,949 | -7.17% |
| Canyon Lake | Riverside | 849 | 28.02% | 2,181 | 71.98% | -1,332 | -43.96% | 3,030 | 1.23% |
| Cathedral City | Riverside | 5,706 | 68.45% | 2,630 | 31.55% | 3,076 | 36.90% | 8,336 | 23.36% |
| Coachella | Riverside | 3,041 | 88.35% | 401 | 11.65% | 2,640 | 76.70% | 3,442 | 13.90% |
| Corona | Riverside | 8,736 | 41.46% | 12,333 | 58.54% | -3,597 | -17.07% | 21,069 | -4.09% |
| Desert Hot Springs | Riverside | 2,150 | 64.49% | 1,184 | 35.51% | 966 | 28.97% | 3,334 | 19.21% |
| Eastvale | Riverside | 2,973 | 46.01% | 3,488 | 53.99% | -515 | -7.97% | 6,461 | -10.38% |
| Hemet | Riverside | 5,893 | 40.68% | 8,594 | 59.32% | -2,701 | -18.64% | 14,487 | -3.04% |
| Indian Wells | Riverside | 661 | 33.88% | 1,290 | 66.12% | -629 | -32.24% | 1,951 | 18.20% |
| Indio | Riverside | 7,467 | 59.54% | 5,074 | 40.46% | 2,393 | 19.08% | 12,541 | 17.13% |
| Jurupa Valley | Riverside | 4,475 | 46.16% | 5,220 | 53.84% | -745 | -7.68% | 9,695 | N/A (Note: City not incorporated until after 2010 election) |
| La Quinta | Riverside | 4,429 | 44.50% | 5,524 | 55.50% | -1,095 | -11.00% | 9,953 | 18.13% |
| Lake Elsinore | Riverside | 2,591 | 41.94% | 3,587 | 58.06% | -996 | -16.12% | 6,178 | -8.11% |
| Indio | Riverside | 5,979 | 36.52% | 10,393 | 63.48% | -4,414 | -26.96% | 16,372 | -5.07% |
| Moreno Valley | Riverside | 13,643 | 61.44% | 8,563 | 38.56% | 5,080 | 22.88% | 22,206 | -0.16% |
| Murrieta | Riverside | 6,393 | 34.42% | 12,180 | 65.58% | -5,787 | -31.16% | 18,573 | -1.53% |
| Norco | Riverside | 1,384 | 27.91% | 3,575 | 72.09% | -2,191 | -44.18% | 4,959 | -10.19% |
| Palm Desert | Riverside | 6,557 | 49.17% | 6,779 | 50.83% | -222 | -1.66% | 13,336 | 21.45% |
| Palm Springs | Riverside | 10,081 | 74.95% | 3,369 | 25.05% | 6,712 | 49.90% | 13,450 | 22.65% |
| Perris | Riverside | 3,698 | 70.36% | 1,558 | 29.64% | 2,140 | 40.72% | 5,256 | 1.65% |
| Rancho Mirage | Riverside | 3,102 | 51.06% | 2,973 | 48.94% | 129 | 2.12% | 6,075 | 21.32% |
| Riverside | Riverside | 22,421 | 51.54% | 21,080 | 48.46% | 1,341 | 3.08% | 43,501 | -2.96% |
| San Jacinto | Riverside | 2,551 | 46.58% | 2,926 | 53.42% | -375 | -6.85% | 5,477 | -4.59% |
| Temecula | Riverside | 6,325 | 34.75% | 11,879 | 65.25% | -5,554 | -30.51% | 18,204 | 1.04% |
| Temecula | Riverside | 1,795 | 32.83% | 3,672 | 67.17% | -1,877 | -34.33% | 5,467 | -7.53% |
| Unincorporated Area | Riverside | 24,563 | 40.77% | 35,691 | 59.23% | -11,128 | -18.47% | 60,254 | -3.95% |
| Citrus Heights | Sacramento | 9,973 | 50.35% | 9,834 | 49.65% | 139 | 0.70% | 19,807 | 3.18% |
| Elk Grove | Sacramento | 23,602 | 63.34% | 13,663 | 36.66% | 9,939 | 26.67% | 37,265 | 7.60% |
| Folsom | Sacramento | 10,455 | 50.13% | 10,402 | 49.87% | 53 | 0.25% | 20,857 | 15.39% |
| Galt | Sacramento | 2,073 | 46.37% | 2,398 | 53.63% | -325 | -7.27% | 4,471 | -8.44% |
| Isleton | Sacramento | 76 | 50.67% | 74 | 49.33% | 2 | 1.33% | 150 | -32.00% |
| Rancho Cordova | Sacramento | 8,085 | 59.38% | 5,531 | 40.62% | 2,554 | 18.76% | 13,616 | 2.58% |
| Sacramento | Sacramento | 74,800 | 76.09% | 23,502 | 23.91% | 51,298 | 52.18% | 98,302 | 7.20% |
| Unincorporated Area | Sacramento | 73,352 | 56.30% | 56,938 | 43.70% | 16,414 | 12.60% | 130,290 | 5.35% |
| Hollister | San Benito | 5,079 | 70.23% | 2,153 | 29.77% | 2,926 | 40.46% | 7,232 | 17.18% |
| San Juan Bautista | San Benito | 388 | 74.62% | 132 | 25.38% | 256 | 49.23% | 520 | 20.96% |
| Unincorporated Area | San Benito | 3,187 | 54.28% | 2,684 | 45.72% | 503 | 8.57% | 5,871 | 20.42% |
| Adelanto | San Bernardino | 1,277 | 58.31% | 913 | 41.69% | 364 | 16.62% | 2,190 | -4.19% |
| Apple Valley | San Bernardino | 4,878 | 32.55% | 10,108 | 67.45% | -5,230 | -34.90% | 14,986 | -5.14% |
| Barstow | San Bernardino | 1,222 | 43.91% | 1,561 | 56.09% | -339 | -12.18% | 2,783 | -14.48% |
| Big Bear Lake | San Bernardino | 456 | 31.32% | 1,000 | 68.68% | -544 | -37.36% | 1,456 | -0.09% |
| Chino | San Bernardino | 5,033 | 46.88% | 5,703 | 53.12% | -670 | -6.24% | 10,736 | -2.88% |
| Chino Hills | San Bernardino | 6,329 | 44.39% | 7,930 | 55.61% | -1,601 | -11.23% | 14,259 | 3.50% |
| Colton | San Bernardino | 3,806 | 67.22% | 1,856 | 32.78% | 1,950 | 34.44% | 5,662 | -1.13% |
| Fontana | San Bernardino | 11,652 | 63.16% | 6,795 | 36.84% | 4,857 | 26.33% | 18,447 | -2.46% |
| Grand Terrace | San Bernardino | 1,252 | 45.63% | 1,492 | 54.37% | -240 | -8.75% | 2,744 | -3.51% |
| Hesperia | San Bernardino | 4,084 | 35.51% | 7,416 | 64.49% | -3,332 | -28.97% | 11,500 | -10.94% |
| Highland | San Bernardino | 3,620 | 47.65% | 3,977 | 52.35% | -357 | -4.70% | 7,597 | -9.37% |
| Loma Linda | San Bernardino | 1,689 | 47.94% | 1,834 | 52.06% | -145 | -4.12% | 3,523 | 4.48% |
| Montclair | San Bernardino | 2,318 | 61.75% | 1,436 | 38.25% | 882 | 23.49% | 3,754 | -3.45% |
| Needles | San Bernardino | 394 | 48.70% | 415 | 51.30% | -21 | -2.60% | 809 | -6.78% |
| Ontario | San Bernardino | 9,701 | 57.32% | 7,222 | 42.68% | 2,479 | 14.65% | 16,923 | -3.09% |
| Rancho Cucamonga | San Bernardino | 13,438 | 44.74% | 16,600 | 55.26% | -3,162 | -10.53% | 30,038 | -1.67% |
| Redlands | San Bernardino | 7,981 | 46.39% | 9,223 | 53.61% | -1,242 | -7.22% | 17,204 | 0.97% |
| Rialto | San Bernardino | 6,798 | 68.14% | 3,178 | 31.86% | 3,620 | 36.29% | 9,976 | -4.52% |
| San Bernardino | San Bernardino | 12,390 | 59.57% | 8,410 | 40.43% | 3,980 | 19.13% | 20,800 | -7.47% |
| Twentynine Palms | San Bernardino | 886 | 39.89% | 1,335 | 60.11% | -449 | -20.22% | 2,221 | -1.69% |
| Upland | San Bernardino | 6,819 | 44.17% | 8,620 | 55.83% | -1,801 | -11.67% | 15,439 | -0.47% |
| Victorville | San Bernardino | 5,693 | 49.26% | 5,865 | 50.74% | -172 | -1.49% | 11,558 | -4.95% |
| Yucaipa | San Bernardino | 3,648 | 33.20% | 7,339 | 66.80% | -3,691 | -33.59% | 10,987 | -9.21% |
| Yucca Valley | San Bernardino | 1,716 | 37.38% | 2,875 | 62.62% | -1,159 | -25.25% | 4,591 | -0.51% |
| Unincorporated Area | San Bernardino | 17,337 | 37.13% | 29,355 | 62.87% | -12,018 | -25.74% | 46,692 | -9.58% |
| Carlsbad | San Diego | 14,183 | 44.71% | 17,542 | 55.29% | -3,359 | -10.59% | 31,725 | 10.60% |
| Chula Vista | San Diego | 22,906 | 58.25% | 16,419 | 41.75% | 6,487 | 16.50% | 39,325 | 7.37% |
| Coronado | San Diego | 2,430 | 39.61% | 3,705 | 60.39% | -1,275 | -20.78% | 6,135 | 10.77% |
| Del Mar | San Diego | 967 | 57.94% | 702 | 42.06% | 265 | 15.88% | 1,669 | 17.50% |
| El Cajon | San Diego | 6,310 | 42.33% | 8,595 | 57.67% | -2,285 | -15.33% | 14,905 | 2.11% |
| Encinitas | San Diego | 11,506 | 58.06% | 8,310 | 41.94% | 3,196 | 16.13% | 19,816 | 14.76% |
| Escondido | San Diego | 12,129 | 43.53% | 15,733 | 56.47% | -3,604 | -12.94% | 27,862 | 8.57% |
| Imperial Beach | San Diego | 2,454 | 56.26% | 1,908 | 43.74% | 546 | 12.52% | 4,362 | 6.45% |
| La Mesa | San Diego | 7,850 | 54.19% | 6,636 | 45.81% | 1,214 | 8.38% | 14,486 | 8.13% |
| Lemon Grove | San Diego | 2,669 | 56.88% | 2,023 | 43.12% | 646 | 13.77% | 4,692 | 3.80% |
| National City | San Diego | 4,549 | 70.11% | 1,939 | 29.89% | 2,610 | 40.23% | 6,488 | 10.56% |
| Oceanside | San Diego | 16,722 | 46.94% | 18,904 | 53.06% | -2,182 | -6.12% | 35,626 | 4.25% |
| Poway | San Diego | 6,233 | 39.30% | 9,628 | 60.70% | -3,395 | -21.40% | 15,861 | 10.94% |
| San Diego | San Diego | 173,613 | 60.00% | 115,764 | 40.00% | 57,849 | 19.99% | 289,377 | 10.58% |
| San Marcos | San Diego | 6,788 | 43.66% | 8,760 | 56.34% | -1,972 | -12.68% | 15,548 | 8.21% |
| Santee | San Diego | 4,862 | 36.23% | 8,557 | 63.77% | -3,695 | -27.54% | 13,419 | -1.70% |
| Solana Beach | San Diego | 2,366 | 52.43% | 2,147 | 47.57% | 219 | 4.85% | 4,513 | 13.23% |
| Vista | San Diego | 6,584 | 44.07% | 8,357 | 55.93% | -1,773 | -11.87% | 14,941 | 4.98% |
| Unincorporated Area | San Diego | 41,298 | 35.11% | 76,313 | 64.89% | -35,015 | -29.77% | 117,611 | 1.47% |
| San Francisco | San Francisco | 196,745 | 88.15% | 26,442 | 11.85% | 170,303 | 76.31% | 223,187 | 15.13% |
| Escalon | San Joaquin | 738 | 42.63% | 993 | 57.37% | -255 | -14.73% | 1,731 | 5.04% |
| Lathrop | San Joaquin | 1,866 | 68.75% | 848 | 31.25% | 1,018 | 37.51% | 2,714 | 15.07% |
| Lodi | San Joaquin | 5,461 | 41.23% | 7,784 | 58.77% | -2,323 | -17.54% | 13,245 | 0.76% |
| Manteca | San Joaquin | 6,950 | 52.54% | 6,279 | 47.46% | 671 | 5.07% | 13,229 | 4.84% |
| Ripon | San Joaquin | 1,361 | 34.12% | 2,628 | 65.88% | -1,267 | -31.76% | 3,989 | 5.41% |
| Stockton | San Joaquin | 26,286 | 64.34% | 14,569 | 35.66% | 11,717 | 28.68% | 40,855 | 4.68% |
| Tracy | San Joaquin | 8,080 | 61.44% | 5,070 | 38.56% | 3,010 | 22.89% | 13,150 | 10.34% |
| Unincorporated Area | San Joaquin | 11,872 | 42.35% | 16,160 | 57.65% | -4,288 | -15.30% | 28,032 | -0.38% |
| Arroyo Grande | San Luis Obispo | 3,619 | 52.28% | 3,304 | 47.72% | 315 | 4.55% | 6,923 | 16.46% |
| Atascadero | San Luis Obispo | 4,588 | 49.64% | 4,654 | 50.36% | -66 | -0.71% | 9,242 | 6.95% |
| El Paso de Robles | San Luis Obispo | 3,528 | 45.11% | 4,293 | 54.89% | -765 | -9.78% | 7,821 | 5.98% |
| Grover Beach | San Luis Obispo | 1,949 | 57.19% | 1,459 | 42.81% | 490 | 14.38% | 3,408 | 10.78% |
| Morro Bay | San Luis Obispo | 2,771 | 64.96% | 1,495 | 35.04% | 1,276 | 29.91% | 4,266 | 16.25% |
| Pismo Beach | San Luis Obispo | 1,824 | 53.81% | 1,566 | 46.19% | 258 | 7.61% | 3,390 | 16.86% |
| San Luis Obispo | San Luis Obispo | 9,114 | 72.21% | 3,508 | 27.79% | 5,606 | 44.41% | 12,622 | 20.81% |
| Unincorporated Area | San Luis Obispo | 19,213 | 50.40% | 18,907 | 49.60% | 306 | 0.80% | 38,120 | 12.54% |
| Atherton | San Mateo | 1,301 | 49.77% | 1,313 | 50.23% | -12 | -0.46% | 2,614 | 20.75% |
| Belmont | San Mateo | 5,482 | 74.75% | 1,852 | 25.25% | 3,630 | 49.50% | 7,334 | 18.02% |
| Brisbane | San Mateo | 1,026 | 81.49% | 233 | 18.51% | 793 | 62.99% | 1,259 | 10.47% |
| Burlingame | San Mateo | 5,737 | 72.87% | 2,136 | 27.13% | 3,601 | 45.74% | 7,873 | 19.30% |
| Colma | San Mateo | 218 | 84.82% | 39 | 15.18% | 179 | 69.65% | 257 | 18.63% |
| Daly City | San Mateo | 10,920 | 82.28% | 2,351 | 17.72% | 8,569 | 64.57% | 13,271 | 15.52% |
| East Palo Alto | San Mateo | 2,243 | 89.72% | 257 | 10.28% | 1,986 | 79.44% | 2,500 | 2.22% |
| Foster City | San Mateo | 4,984 | 74.09% | 1,743 | 25.91% | 3,241 | 48.18% | 6,727 | 21.50% |
| Half Moon Bay | San Mateo | 2,791 | 74.13% | 974 | 25.87% | 1,817 | 48.26% | 3,765 | 17.89% |
| Hillsborough | San Mateo | 1,978 | 54.66% | 1,641 | 45.34% | 337 | 9.31% | 3,619 | 28.39% |
| Menlo Park | San Mateo | 7,557 | 75.39% | 2,467 | 24.61% | 5,090 | 50.78% | 10,024 | 17.42% |
| Millbrae | San Mateo | 3,377 | 70.47% | 1,415 | 29.53% | 1,962 | 40.94% | 4,792 | 16.22% |
| Pacifica | San Mateo | 8,554 | 78.86% | 2,293 | 21.14% | 6,261 | 57.72% | 10,847 | 11.77% |
| Portola Valley | San Mateo | 1,341 | 68.80% | 608 | 31.20% | 733 | 37.61% | 1,949 | 19.53% |
| Redwood City | San Mateo | 11,933 | 75.68% | 3,835 | 24.32% | 8,098 | 51.36% | 15,768 | 16.76% |
| San Bruno | San Mateo | 6,134 | 76.95% | 1,837 | 23.05% | 4,297 | 53.91% | 7,971 | 10.37% |
| San Carlos | San Mateo | 6,853 | 73.67% | 2,449 | 26.33% | 4,404 | 47.34% | 9,302 | 20.36% |
| San Mateo | San Mateo | 15,871 | 75.15% | 5,249 | 24.85% | 10,622 | 50.29% | 21,120 | 16.12% |
| South San Francisco | San Mateo | 8,093 | 79.81% | 2,047 | 20.19% | 6,046 | 59.63% | 10,140 | 12.09% |
| Woodside | San Mateo | 1,210 | 58.45% | 860 | 41.55% | 350 | 16.91% | 2,070 | 17.12% |
| Unincorporated Area | San Mateo | 12,677 | 75.94% | 4,016 | 24.06% | 8,661 | 51.88% | 16,693 | 13.90% |
| Buellton | Santa Barbara | 774 | 46.65% | 885 | 53.35% | -111 | -6.69% | 1,659 | 12.99% |
| Carpinteria | Santa Barbara | 2,692 | 67.23% | 1,312 | 32.77% | 1,380 | 34.47% | 4,004 | 19.34% |
| Goleta | Santa Barbara | 6,000 | 63.32% | 3,476 | 36.68% | 2,524 | 26.64% | 9,476 | 15.17% |
| Guadalupe | Santa Barbara | 724 | 74.72% | 245 | 25.28% | 479 | 49.43% | 969 | 8.65% |
| Lompoc | Santa Barbara | 3,979 | 51.18% | 3,795 | 48.82% | 184 | 2.37% | 7,774 | 11.01% |
| Santa Barbara | Santa Barbara | 19,154 | 73.51% | 6,901 | 26.49% | 12,253 | 47.03% | 26,055 | 16.34% |
| Santa Maria | Santa Barbara | 7,447 | 52.23% | 6,810 | 47.77% | 637 | 4.47% | 14,257 | 10.04% |
| Solvang | Santa Barbara | 935 | 44.50% | 1,166 | 55.50% | -231 | -10.99% | 2,101 | 17.76% |
| Unincorporated Area | Santa Barbara | 23,207 | 51.43% | 21,913 | 48.57% | 1,294 | 2.87% | 45,120 | 9.82% |
| Campbell | Santa Clara | 7,296 | 70.75% | 3,016 | 29.25% | 4,280 | 41.51% | 10,312 | 17.23% |
| Cupertino | Santa Clara | 10,860 | 72.55% | 4,109 | 27.45% | 6,751 | 45.10% | 14,969 | 24.89% |
| Gilroy | Santa Clara | 5,941 | 64.96% | 3,204 | 35.04% | 2,737 | 29.93% | 9,145 | 8.82% |
| Los Altos | Santa Clara | 8,398 | 70.58% | 3,501 | 29.42% | 4,897 | 41.15% | 11,899 | 23.10% |
| Los Altos Hills | Santa Clara | 2,025 | 60.14% | 1,342 | 39.86% | 683 | 20.29% | 3,367 | 21.65% |
| Los Gatos | Santa Clara | 6,800 | 65.94% | 3,512 | 34.06% | 3,288 | 31.89% | 10,312 | 20.53% |
| Milpitas | Santa Clara | 9,738 | 74.72% | 3,295 | 25.28% | 6,443 | 49.44% | 13,033 | 26.51% |
| Monte Sereno | Santa Clara | 834 | 58.00% | 604 | 42.00% | 230 | 15.99% | 1,438 | 22.07% |
| Morgan Hill | Santa Clara | 5,840 | 61.27% | 3,691 | 38.73% | 2,149 | 22.55% | 9,531 | 15.28% |
| Mountain View | Santa Clara | 13,722 | 79.61% | 3,515 | 20.39% | 10,207 | 59.22% | 17,237 | 15.36% |
| Palo Alto | Santa Clara | 17,059 | 79.92% | 4,285 | 20.08% | 12,774 | 59.85% | 21,344 | 13.41% |
| San Jose | Santa Clara | 141,644 | 74.18% | 49,304 | 25.82% | 92,340 | 48.36% | 190,948 | 20.77% |
| Santa Clara | Santa Clara | 17,231 | 74.68% | 5,841 | 25.32% | 11,390 | 49.37% | 23,072 | 17.52% |
| Saratoga | Santa Clara | 7,162 | 62.52% | 4,294 | 37.48% | 2,868 | 25.03% | 11,456 | 26.66% |
| Sunnyvale | Santa Clara | 21,264 | 74.87% | 7,139 | 25.13% | 14,125 | 49.73% | 28,403 | 18.49% |
| Unincorporated Area | Santa Clara | 12,918 | 66.66% | 6,461 | 33.34% | 6,457 | 33.32% | 19,379 | 13.52% |
| Capitola | Santa Cruz | 2,353 | 78.80% | 633 | 21.20% | 1,720 | 57.60% | 2,986 | 12.32% |
| Santa Cruz | Santa Cruz | 14,988 | 87.25% | 2,190 | 12.75% | 12,798 | 74.50% | 17,178 | 10.52% |
| Scotts Valley | Santa Cruz | 2,678 | 66.75% | 1,334 | 33.25% | 1,344 | 33.50% | 4,012 | 16.80% |
| Watsonville | Santa Cruz | 4,963 | 80.65% | 1,191 | 19.35% | 3,772 | 61.29% | 6,154 | 10.56% |
| Unincorporated Area | Santa Cruz | 31,995 | 75.91% | 10,151 | 24.09% | 21,844 | 51.83% | 42,146 | 14.26% |
| Anderson | Shasta | 782 | 37.06% | 1,328 | 62.94% | -546 | -25.88% | 2,110 | -7.81% |
| Redding | Shasta | 11,124 | 41.17% | 15,895 | 58.83% | -4,771 | -17.66% | 27,019 | 9.36% |
| Shasta Lake | Shasta | 1,085 | 39.92% | 1,633 | 60.08% | -548 | -20.16% | 2,718 | 1.21% |
| Unincorporated Area | Shasta | 8,518 | 34.53% | 16,151 | 65.47% | -7,633 | -30.94% | 24,669 | 1.97% |
| Loyalton | Sierra | 111 | 41.26% | 158 | 58.74% | -47 | -17.47% | 269 | 8.80% |
| Unincorporated Area | Sierra | 568 | 44.83% | 699 | 55.17% | -131 | -10.34% | 1,267 | 10.98% |
| Dorris | Siskiyou | 59 | 34.71% | 111 | 65.29% | -52 | -30.59% | 170 | -0.76% |
| Dunsmuir | Siskiyou | 313 | 61.37% | 197 | 38.63% | 116 | 22.75% | 510 | 8.73% |
| Etna | Siskiyou | 91 | 39.74% | 138 | 60.26% | -47 | -20.52% | 229 | 1.34% |
| Fort Jones | Siskiyou | 57 | 31.32% | 125 | 68.68% | -68 | -37.36% | 182 | -2.44% |
| Montague | Siskiyou | 110 | 35.37% | 201 | 64.63% | -91 | -29.26% | 311 | 6.93% |
| Mt. Shasta | Siskiyou | 721 | 67.64% | 345 | 32.36% | 376 | 35.27% | 1,066 | 9.13% |
| Tulelake | Siskiyou | 48 | 34.04% | 93 | 65.96% | -45 | -31.91% | 141 | 4.00% |
| Weed | Siskiyou | 340 | 59.75% | 229 | 40.25% | 111 | 19.51% | 569 | 6.47% |
| Yreka | Siskiyou | 850 | 43.84% | 1,089 | 56.16% | -239 | -12.33% | 1,939 | 8.13% |
| Unincorporated Area | Siskiyou | 3,514 | 40.38% | 5,189 | 59.62% | -1,675 | -19.25% | 8,703 | -0.45% |
| Benicia | Solano | 6,372 | 68.86% | 2,882 | 31.14% | 3,490 | 37.71% | 9,254 | 13.60% |
| Dixon | Solano | 2,146 | 52.09% | 1,974 | 47.91% | 172 | 4.17% | 4,120 | 1.07% |
| Fairfield | Solano | 12,895 | 64.31% | 7,155 | 35.69% | 5,740 | 28.63% | 20,050 | 7.65% |
| Rio Vista | Solano | 1,788 | 52.85% | 1,595 | 47.15% | 193 | 5.70% | 3,383 | 0.12% |
| Suisun City | Solano | 3,467 | 69.12% | 1,549 | 30.88% | 1,918 | 38.24% | 5,016 | 5.09% |
| Vacaville | Solano | 11,577 | 55.88% | 9,139 | 44.12% | 2,438 | 11.77% | 20,716 | 6.07% |
| Vallejo | Solano | 17,512 | 79.29% | 4,573 | 20.71% | 12,939 | 58.59% | 22,085 | 9.18% |
| Unincorporated Area | Solano | 2,117 | 42.31% | 2,887 | 57.69% | -770 | -15.39% | 5,004 | 1.49% |
| Cloverdale | Sonoma | 1,801 | 70.43% | 756 | 29.57% | 1,045 | 40.87% | 2,557 | 18.28% |
| Cotati | Sonoma | 1,695 | 78.22% | 472 | 21.78% | 1,223 | 56.44% | 2,167 | 15.78% |
| Healdsburg | Sonoma | 3,168 | 76.61% | 967 | 23.39% | 2,201 | 53.23% | 4,135 | 16.61% |
| Petaluma | Sonoma | 14,525 | 76.48% | 4,466 | 23.52% | 10,059 | 52.97% | 18,991 | 16.47% |
| Rohnert Park | Sonoma | 6,718 | 71.77% | 2,643 | 28.23% | 4,075 | 43.53% | 9,361 | 12.67% |
| Santa Rosa | Sonoma | 33,094 | 74.98% | 11,042 | 25.02% | 22,052 | 49.96% | 44,136 | 15.39% |
| Sebastopol | Sonoma | 2,744 | 87.19% | 403 | 12.81% | 2,341 | 74.39% | 3,147 | 9.87% |
| Sonoma | Sonoma | 3,200 | 76.52% | 982 | 23.48% | 2,218 | 53.04% | 4,182 | 16.49% |
| Windsor | Sonoma | 5,068 | 67.14% | 2,480 | 32.86% | 2,588 | 34.29% | 7,548 | 18.36% |
| Unincorporated Area | Sonoma | 35,315 | 74.58% | 12,038 | 25.42% | 23,277 | 49.16% | 47,353 | 13.55% |
| Ceres | Stanislaus | 3,496 | 61.02% | 2,233 | 38.98% | 1,263 | 22.05% | 5,729 | 13.36% |
| Hughson | Stanislaus | 576 | 42.20% | 789 | 57.80% | -213 | -15.60% | 1,365 | 2.07% |
| Modesto | Stanislaus | 20,573 | 55.24% | 16,673 | 44.76% | 3,900 | 10.47% | 37,246 | 10.50% |
| Newman | Stanislaus | 807 | 58.69% | 568 | 41.31% | 239 | 17.38% | 1,375 | 12.91% |
| Oakdale | Stanislaus | 1,912 | 43.30% | 2,504 | 56.70% | -592 | -13.41% | 4,416 | 6.08% |
| Patterson | Stanislaus | 1,892 | 64.38% | 1,047 | 35.62% | 845 | 28.75% | 2,939 | 9.25% |
| Riverbank | Stanislaus | 1,751 | 53.63% | 1,514 | 46.37% | 237 | 7.26% | 3,265 | 6.01% |
| Turlock | Stanislaus | 6,982 | 50.46% | 6,855 | 49.54% | 127 | 0.92% | 13,837 | 12.92% |
| Waterford | Stanislaus | 566 | 41.86% | 786 | 58.14% | -220 | -16.27% | 1,352 | -4.29% |
| Unincorporated Area | Stanislaus | 8,011 | 42.55% | 10,817 | 57.45% | -2,806 | -14.90% | 18,828 | 6.67% |
| Live Oak | Sutter | 637 | 54.63% | 529 | 45.37% | 108 | 9.26% | 1,166 | -2.19% |
| Yuba City | Sutter | 6,115 | 46.55% | 7,022 | 53.45% | -907 | -6.90% | 13,137 | 4.82% |
| Unincorporated Area | Sutter | 1,936 | 32.11% | 4,093 | 67.89% | -2,157 | -35.78% | 6,029 | 2.24% |
| Corning | Tehama | 425 | 40.32% | 629 | 59.68% | -204 | -19.35% | 1,054 | -2.70% |
| Red Bluff | Tehama | 1,117 | 42.46% | 1,514 | 57.54% | -397 | -15.09% | 2,631 | -3.99% |
| Tehama | Tehama | 47 | 38.84% | 74 | 61.16% | -27 | -22.31% | 121 | -1.02% |
| Unincorporated Area | Tehama | 3,819 | 33.05% | 7,735 | 66.95% | -3,916 | -33.89% | 11,554 | -2.39% |
| Unincorporated Area | Trinity | 1,711 | 44.17% | 2,163 | 55.83% | -452 | -11.67% | 3,874 | -9.77% |
| Dinuba | Tulare | 1,229 | 52.72% | 1,102 | 47.28% | 127 | 5.45% | 2,331 | -0.12% |
| Exeter | Tulare | 539 | 30.42% | 1,233 | 69.58% | -694 | -39.16% | 1,772 | -4.59% |
| Farmersville | Tulare | 461 | 57.13% | 346 | 42.87% | 115 | 14.25% | 807 | -11.01% |
| Lindsay | Tulare | 567 | 61.23% | 359 | 38.77% | 208 | 22.46% | 926 | 0.66% |
| Porterville | Tulare | 3,013 | 45.21% | 3,651 | 54.79% | -638 | -9.57% | 6,664 | -10.55% |
| Tulare | Tulare | 2,771 | 38.18% | 4,486 | 61.82% | -1,715 | -23.63% | 7,257 | -8.53% |
| Visalia | Tulare | 8,022 | 37.03% | 13,644 | 62.97% | -5,622 | -25.95% | 21,666 | -1.02% |
| Woodlake | Tulare | 514 | 71.39% | 206 | 28.61% | 308 | 42.78% | 720 | 3.72% |
| Unincorporated Area | Tulare | 6,592 | 33.70% | 12,969 | 66.30% | -6,377 | -32.60% | 19,561 | -4.94% |
| Sonora | Tuolumne | 372 | 55.61% | 297 | 44.39% | 75 | 11.21% | 669 | 10.69% |
| Unincorporated Area | Tuolumne | 7,031 | 45.83% | 8,311 | 54.17% | -1,280 | -8.34% | 15,342 | 5.90% |
| Multiple Districts | Tuolumne | 548 | 54.91% | 450 | 45.09% | 98 | 9.82% | 998 | N/A |
| Camarillo | Ventura | 10,061 | 47.66% | 11,050 | 52.34% | -989 | -4.68% | 21,111 | 10.93% |
| Fillmore | Ventura | 1,444 | 56.56% | 1,109 | 43.44% | 335 | 13.12% | 2,553 | 5.14% |
| Moorpark | Ventura | 4,330 | 46.62% | 4,957 | 53.38% | -627 | -6.75% | 9,287 | 8.87% |
| Ojai | Ventura | 1,860 | 66.74% | 927 | 33.26% | 933 | 33.48% | 2,787 | 11.72% |
| Oxnard | Ventura | 20,135 | 70.43% | 8,452 | 29.57% | 11,683 | 40.87% | 28,587 | 11.36% |
| Port Hueneme | Ventura | 2,491 | 63.90% | 1,407 | 36.10% | 1,084 | 27.81% | 3,898 | 9.31% |
| San Buenaventura | Ventura | 17,972 | 59.54% | 12,211 | 40.46% | 5,761 | 19.09% | 30,183 | 12.44% |
| Santa Paula | Ventura | 3,150 | 61.63% | 1,961 | 38.37% | 1,189 | 23.26% | 5,111 | 3.18% |
| Simi Valley | Ventura | 11,829 | 39.94% | 17,788 | 60.06% | -5,959 | -20.12% | 29,617 | 2.15% |
| Thousand Oaks | Ventura | 19,297 | 47.79% | 21,082 | 52.21% | -1,785 | -4.42% | 40,379 | 12.16% |
| Unincorporated Area | Ventura | 13,503 | 51.23% | 12,853 | 48.77% | 650 | 2.47% | 26,356 | 9.49% |
| Davis | Yolo | 14,831 | 82.00% | 3,255 | 18.00% | 11,576 | 64.01% | 18,086 | 9.32% |
| West Sacramento | Yolo | 6,423 | 68.70% | 2,927 | 31.30% | 3,496 | 37.39% | 9,350 | 6.21% |
| Winters | Yolo | 838 | 61.75% | 519 | 38.25% | 319 | 23.51% | 1,357 | 4.83% |
| Woodland | Yolo | 6,682 | 59.30% | 4,587 | 40.70% | 2,095 | 18.59% | 11,269 | 8.37% |
| Unincorporated Area | Yolo | 2,657 | 49.09% | 2,755 | 50.91% | -98 | -1.81% | 5,412 | -0.46% |
| Marysville | Yuba | 927 | 46.40% | 1,071 | 53.60% | -144 | -7.21% | 1,998 | -4.42% |
| Wheatland | Yuba | 286 | 39.89% | 431 | 60.11% | -145 | -20.22% | 717 | 4.40% |
| Unincorporated Area | Yuba | 3,953 | 40.77% | 5,743 | 59.23% | -1,790 | -18.46% | 9,696 | -3.09% |
| Totals | | 4,388,368 | 59.97% | 2,929,213 | 40.03% | 1,459,155 | 19.94% | 7,317,581 | 7.05% |

Cities & Unincorporated Areas that flipped from Republican to Democratic

- Clayton (Contra Costa)
- Danville (Contra Costa)
- Placerville (El Dorado)
- Ferndale (Humboldt)
- Agoura Hills (Los Angeles)
- Arcadia (Los Angeles)
- Diamond Bar (Los Angeles)
- Manhattan Beach (Los Angeles)
- Vernon (Los Angeles)
- Unincorporated Area of Nevada
- Buena Park (Orange)
- Garden Grove (Orange)
- Irvine (Orange)
- Laguna Woods (Orange)
- Westminster (Orange)
- Auburn (Placer)
- Rancho Mirage (Riverside)
- Citrus Heights (Sacramento)
- Folsom (Sacramento)
- Unincorporated Area of San Benito
- Del Mar (San Diego)
- Solana Beach (San Diego)
- Arroyo Grande (San Luis Obispo)
- Pismo Beach (San Luis Obispo)
- Unincorporated Area of San Luis Obispo
- Hillsborough (San Mateo)
- Woodside (San Mateo)
- Lompoc (Santa Barbara)
- Santa Maria (Santa Barbara)
- Unincorporated Area of Santa Barbara
- Los Altos Hills (Santa Clara)
- Monte Sereno (Santa Clara)
- Saratoga (Santa Clara)
- Modesto (Stanislaus)
- Turlock (Stanislaus)
- Unincorporated Area of Ventura

Cities & Unincorporated Areas that flipped from Tie to Democratic

- Amador (Amador)

Cities & Unincorporated Areas that flipped from Democratic to Republican

- Sutter Creek (Amador)
- Unincorporated Area of Del Norte
- Coalinga (Fresno)
- Susanville (Lassen)
- Eastvale (Riverside)
- Galt (Sacramento)
- Barstow (San Bernardino)
- Highland (San Bernardino)
- Needles (San Bernardino)
- Victorville (San Bernardino)
- Porterville (Tulare)
