= PPIC =

Protein-coding gene in the species Homo sapiens

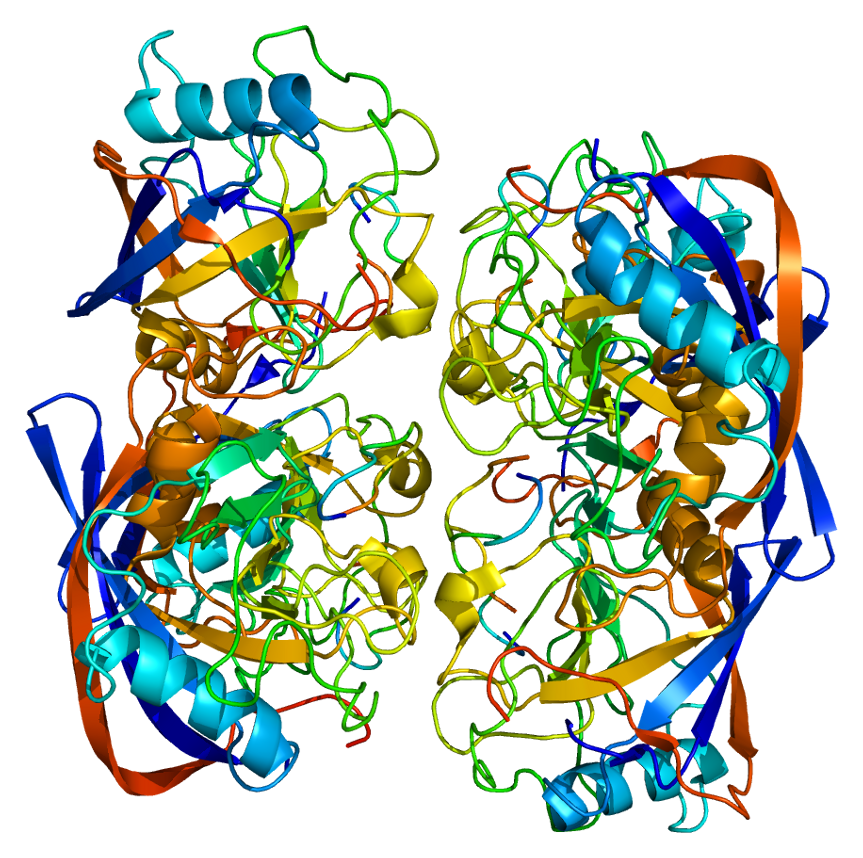

Identifiers
- Aliases: PPIC, CYPC, peptidylprolyl isomerase C
- External IDs: OMIM: 123842; MGI: 97751; GeneCards: PPIC
Available structures
PDB	Ortholog search: PDBe RCSB
PDB	List of PDB id codes 2ESL
Enzyme activity
EC #	BRENDA	ExPASy	KEGG	MetaCyc
5.2.1.8	↗	↗	↗	↗

Gene location (Human)
Chr.	Chromosome 5 (human)
Band	5q23.2	Start	123,023,250 bp
Band	5q23.2	End	123,036,725 bp

Gene location (Mouse)
Chr.	Chromosome 18 (mouse)
Band	18|18 D1	Start	53,539,404 bp
Band	18|18 D1	End	53,551,187 bp
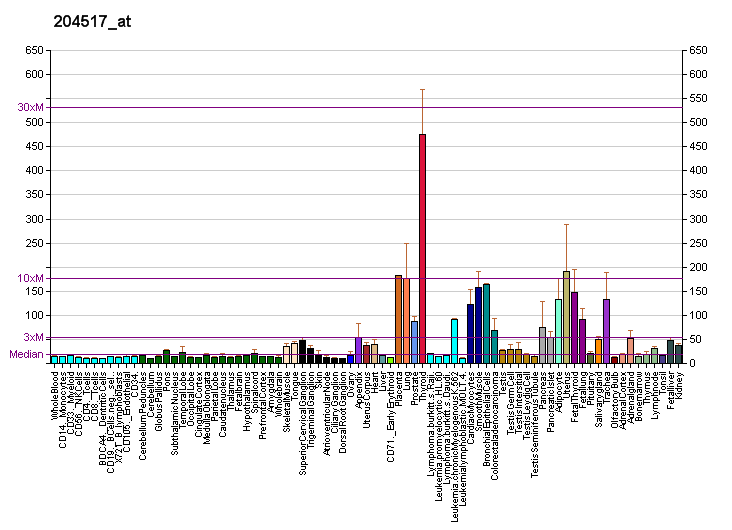

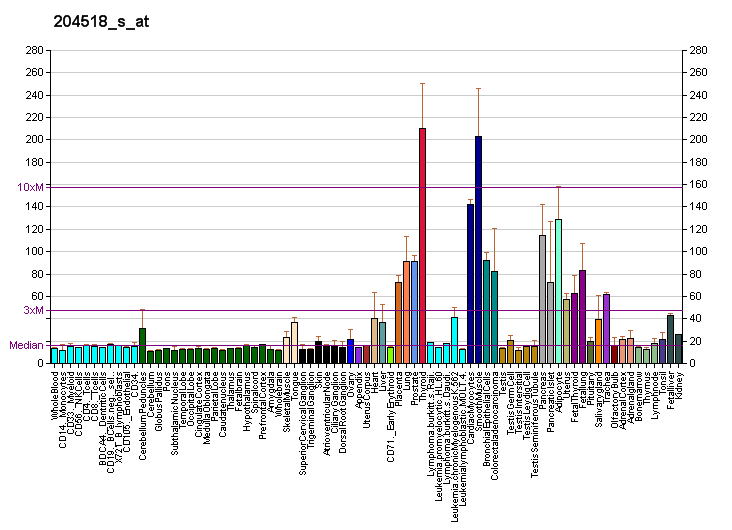
RNA expression pattern
Bgee	Human / Mouse (ortholog); Top expressed in: tibia; tendon of biceps brachii; skin of hip; gums; gingival epithelium; pancreatic ductal cell; mucosa of sigmoid colon; periodontal fiber; palpebral conjunctiva; parotid gland / Top expressed in: molar; calvaria; body of femur; dermis; endothelial cell of lymphatic vessel; efferent ductule; atrium; atrioventricular valve; left lung lobe; endocardial cushion; More reference expression data
BioGPS	More reference expression data
Gene ontology
Molecular function	cyclosporin A binding; protein binding; isomerase activity; peptidyl-prolyl cis-trans isomerase activity; unfolded protein binding
Cellular component	cytoplasm; extracellular exosome
Biological process	protein folding; protein peptidyl-prolyl isomerization; protein refolding
Sources:Amigo / QuickGO
Orthologs
Databases	NCBI: entry; OMA: entry
Species	Human	Mouse
Entrez	5480	19038
Ensembl	ENSG00000168938	ENSMUSG00000024538
UniProt	P45877	P30412
RefSeq (mRNA)	NM_000943	NM_008908
RefSeq (protein)	NP_000934	NP_032934
Location (UCSC)	Chr 5: 123.02 – 123.04 Mb	Chr 18: 53.54 – 53.55 Mb
PubMed search
- Wikidata
View/Edit Human	View/Edit Mouse

Peptidyl-prolyl cis-trans isomerase C (PPIC) is an enzyme that in humans is encoded by the PPIC gene on chromosome 5. As a member of the peptidyl-prolyl cis-trans isomerase (PPIase) family, this protein catalyzes the cis-trans isomerization of proline imidic peptide bonds, which allows it to facilitate folding or repair of proteins. In addition, PPIC participates in many biological processes, including mitochondrial metabolism, apoptosis, redox, and inflammation, as well as in related diseases and conditions, such as ischemic reperfusion injury, AIDS, and cancer.

== Structure ==
Like other cyclophilins, PPIC forms a β-barrel structure with a hydrophobic core. This β-barrel is composed of eight anti-parallel β-strands and capped by two α-helices at the top and bottom. In addition, the β-turns and loops in the strands contribute to the flexibility of the barrel. PPIC in particular is composed of 212 residues and contains a hydrophobic, ER-targeting sequence at the N-terminal. The PPIase domain is homologous to PPIA and can be bound and inhibited by CsA.

== Function ==
The protein encoded by this gene is a member of the peptidyl-prolyl cis-trans isomerase (PPIase) family. PPIases catalyze the cis-trans isomerization of proline imidic peptide bonds in oligopeptides and accelerate the folding of proteins. Generally, PPIases are found in all eubacteria and eukaryotes, as well as in a few archaebacteria, and thus are highly conserved. The PPIase family is further divided into three structurally distinct subfamilies: cyclophilin (CyP), FK506-binding protein (FKBP), and parvulin (Pvn). As a cyclophilin, PPI binds cyclosporin A (CsA) and can be found within the cell or secreted by the cell. In eukaryotes, cyclophilins localize ubiquitously to many cell and tissue types, though PPIC especially is highly expressed in kidney. In addition to PPIase and protein chaperone activities, cyclophilins function in mitochondrial metabolism, apoptosis, immunological response, inflammation, and cell growth and proliferation. Along with PPIB, PPIC localizes to the endoplasmic reticulum (ER), where it maintains redox homeostasis. Depletion of these two cyclophilins lead to hyperoxidation of the ER. In the brain, PPIC complexes with cyclophilin C-associated protein (CyCAP) to activate microglia and macrophage function via the calcineurin/NFAT pathway.

== Clinical Significance ==
As a cyclophilin, PPIC binds the immunosuppressive drug CsA to form a CsA-cyclophilin complex, which then targets calcineurin to inhibit the signaling pathway for T-cell activation.

In cardiac myogenic cells, cyclophilins have been observed to be activated by heat shock and hypoxia-reoxygenation as well as complex with heat shock proteins. Thus, cyclophilins may function in cardioprotection during ischemia-reperfusion injury. Similarly, PPIC may confer neuroprotection by forming a complex with CyCAP to activate survival mechanisms and mitigate ischemic damage in the brain.

Currently, cyclophilin expression is highly correlated with cancer pathogenesis, but the specific mechanisms remain to be elucidated. For instance, studies identify PPIC as a reliable indicator of circulating tumor cells in epithelial ovarian cancer (EOC) and, thus, may serve as a biomarker for detection and treatment of the cancer.

== Interactions ==
PPIC has been shown to interact with:

- CsA,
- CyCAP,
- calcineurin, and
- NFATc1.
