= LGALS3BP =

Protein-coding gene in the species Homo sapiens

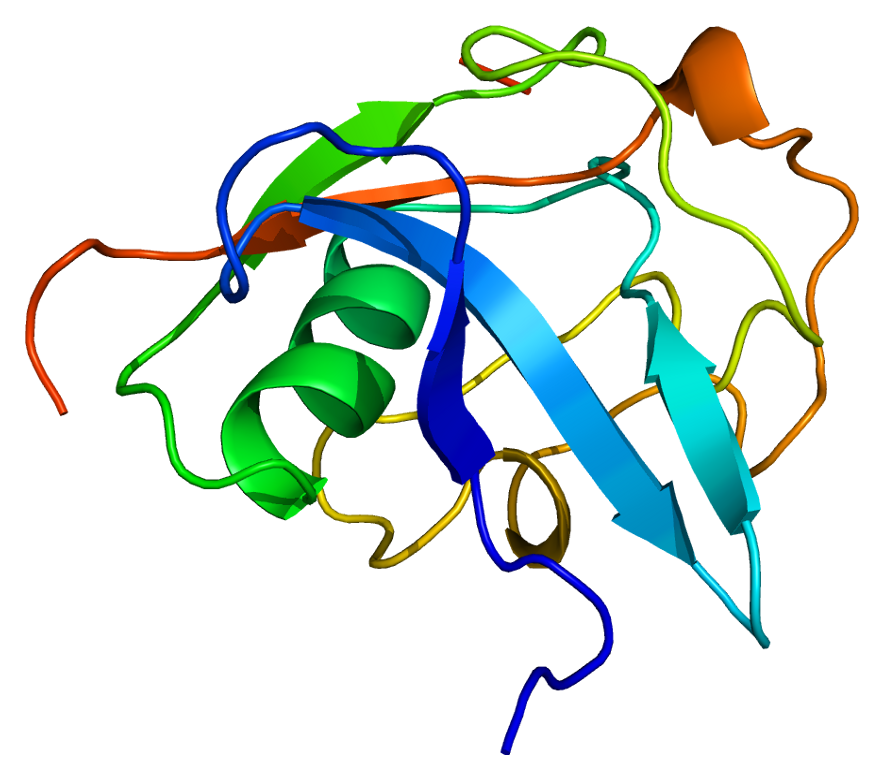

Identifiers
- Aliases: LGALS3BP, 90K, BTBD17B, CyCAP, M2BP, MAC-2-BP, TANGO10B, gp90, galectin 3 binding protein
- External IDs: OMIM: 600626; MGI: 99554; GeneCards: LGALS3BP
Available structures
PDB	Ortholog search: PDBe RCSB
PDB	List of PDB id codes 1BY2

Gene location (Human)
Chr.	Chromosome 17 (human)
Band	17q25.3	Start	78,971,238 bp
Band	17q25.3	End	78,979,947 bp

Gene location (Mouse)
Chr.	Chromosome 11 (mouse)
Band	11|11 E2	Start	118,283,577 bp
Band	11|11 E2	End	118,292,918 bp
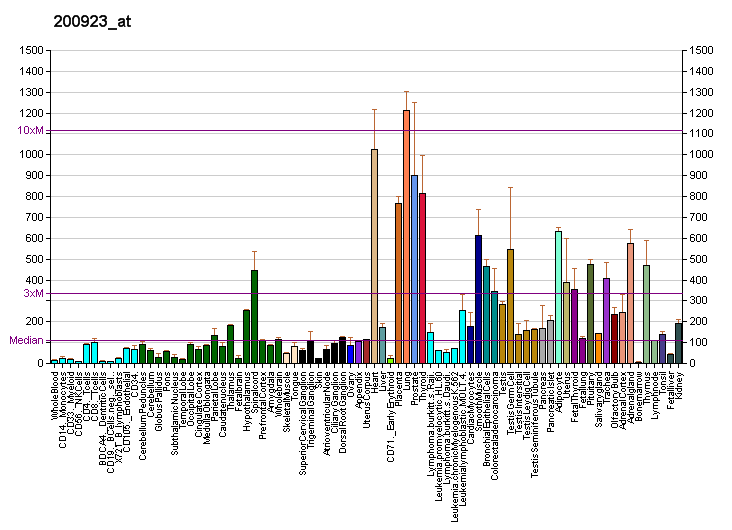
RNA expression pattern
Bgee	Human / Mouse (ortholog); Top expressed in: right adrenal cortex; mucosa of transverse colon; gallbladder; right uterine tube; left adrenal gland; left adrenal cortex; apex of heart; mucosa of ileum; anterior pituitary; right auricle of heart / Top expressed in: stroma of bone marrow; calvaria; gastric mucosa; mucous cell of stomach; islet of Langerhans; epithelium of stomach; duodenum; ileum; subcutaneous adipose tissue; decidua; More reference expression data
BioGPS	More reference expression data
Gene ontology
Molecular function	scavenger receptor activity; protein binding
Cellular component	extracellular matrix; extracellular exosome; blood microparticle; membrane; platelet dense granule lumen; extracellular space; extracellular region; collagen-containing extracellular matrix
Biological process	cellular defense response; cell adhesion; signal transduction; platelet degranulation; receptor-mediated endocytosis; vesicle-mediated transport; endocytosis
Sources:Amigo / QuickGO
Orthologs
Databases	NCBI: entry; OMA: entry
Species	Human	Mouse
Entrez	3959	19039
Ensembl	ENSG00000108679	ENSMUSG00000033880
UniProt	Q08380	Q07797
RefSeq (mRNA)	NM_005567	NM_011150
RefSeq (protein)	NP_005558	NP_035280
Location (UCSC)	Chr 17: 78.97 – 78.98 Mb	Chr 11: 118.28 – 118.29 Mb
PubMed search
- Wikidata
View/Edit Human	View/Edit Mouse

Galectin-3-binding protein is a protein that in humans is encoded by the LGALS3BP gene.

== Function ==
The galectins are a family of beta-galactoside-binding proteins implicated in modulating cell–cell and cell–matrix interactions. Using fluorescence in–situ hybridization, the full length 90K cDNA has been localized to chromosome 17q25. The native protein binds specifically to a human macrophage-associated lectin known as Mac-2 and also binds to galectin 1.

== Clinical significance ==
LGALS3BP has been found elevated in the serum of patients with cancer and in those infected by the human immunodeficiency virus (HIV). It appears to be implicated in immune response associated with natural killer (NK) and lymphokine-activated killer (LAK) cell cytotoxicity.

== Interactions ==
LGALS3BP has been shown to interact with LGALS3.
