= 1904 United States House of Representatives elections in California =

United States House of Representatives elections in California, 1904
- November 8, 1904

All 8 California seats to the United States House of Representatives
	Majority party	Minority party
Party	Republican	Democratic
Last election	5	3
Seats won	8	0
Seat change	▲3	▼3
Popular vote	186,427	112,587
Percentage	56.8%	34.3%
- Election results by district.

The United States House of Representatives elections in California, 1904 was an election for California's delegation to the United States House of Representatives, which occurred as part of the general election of the House of Representatives on November 8, 1904. Republicans won the three Democratic-held districts, giving California an all-Republican House delegation, which it would maintain until 1910.

== Overview ==
United States House of Representatives elections in California, 1904
Party	Votes	Percentage	Seats	+/–
Republican	186,427	56.8%	8	+3
Democratic	112,587	34.3%	0	-3
Socialist	21,635	6.6%	0	0
Prohibition	6,405	2.0%	0	0
Union Labor	916	0.3%	0	0
Totals	327,970	100.0%	8	—

== Delegation Composition ==
Pre-election	Seats
Republican-Held	5
Democratic-Held	3

Post-election	Seats
Republican-Held	8

== Results ==
=== District 1 ===
California's 1st congressional district election, 1904
Party	Candidate	Votes	%
Republican	James Gillett (incumbent)	21,602	54.1
Democratic	Anthony Caminetti	15,706	39.3
Socialist	A. J. Gaylord	2,197	5.5
Prohibition	Jarrot L. Rollins	421	1.1
Total votes		39,926	100.0
Turnout			
Republican hold			

=== District 2 ===
California's 2nd congressional district election, 1904
Party	Candidate	Votes	%
Republican	Duncan E. McKinlay	22,873	51.8
Democratic	Theodore Arlington Bell (incumbent)	21,640	46.6
Socialist	J. H. White	1,524	3.3
Prohibition	Eli P. LaCell	431	0.9
Total votes		46,468	100.0
Turnout			
Republican gain from Democratic			

=== District 3 ===
California's 3rd congressional district election, 1904
Party	Candidate	Votes	%
Republican	Joseph R. Knowland (incumbent)	24,637	68.6
Democratic	Henry C. McPike	7,210	20.1
Socialist	Michael Lesser	3,617	10.1
Prohibition	Bates Morris	471	1.3
Total votes		35,935	100.0
Turnout			
Republican hold			

=== District 4 ===
California's 4th congressional district election, 1904
Party	Candidate	Votes	%
Republican	Julius Kahn	20,012	62.4
Democratic	Edward J. Livernash (incumbent)	12,812	36.4
Socialist	William E. Costley	2,267	6.4
Total votes		35,091	100.0
Turnout			
Republican gain from Democratic			

=== District 5 ===
California's 5th congressional district election, 1904
Party	Candidate	Votes	%
Republican	Everis A. Hayes	23,701	52.3
Democratic	William J. Wynn (incumbent)	18,025	39.7
Socialist	F. R. Whitney	2,263	5.0
Union Labor	Charles J. Williams	916	2.0
Prohibition	George B. Pratt	445	1.0
Total votes		45,350	100.0
Turnout			
Republican gain from Democratic			

=== District 6 ===
California's 6th congressional district election, 1904
Party	Candidate	Votes	%
Republican	James C. Needham (incumbent)	18,828	55.1
Democratic	William M. Conley	13,074	38.2
Socialist	J. L. Cobb	1,537	4.5
Prohibition	Joel H. Smith	740	2.2
Total votes		34,079	100.0
Turnout			
Republican hold			

=== District 7 ===
California's 7th congressional district election, 1904
Party	Candidate	Votes	%
Republican	James McLachlan (incumbent)	31,091	64.2
Democratic	W. O. Morton	11,259	23.3
Socialist	F. I. Wheat	3,594	7.4
Prohibition	John Sobieski	2,467	5.1
Total votes		48,411	100.0
Turnout			
Republican hold			

=== District 8 ===
California's 8th congressional district election, 1904
Party	Candidate	Votes	%
Republican	Sylvester C. Smith	23,683	55.6
Democratic	William T. Lucas	12,861	34.5
Socialist	Noble A. Richardson	4,636	9.9
Prohibition	Benjamin J. Cloes	1,430	3.4
Total votes		42,610	100.0
Turnout			
Republican hold			

== See also ==
- 59th United States Congress
- Political party strength in California
- Political party strength in U.S. states
- United States House of Representatives elections, 1904
