= 1906 United States House of Representatives elections in California =

United States House of Representatives elections in California, 1906
- November 6, 1906

All 8 California seats to the United States House of Representatives
	Majority party	Minority party
Party	Republican	Democratic
Last election	8	0
Seats won	8	0
Seat change	Steady	Steady
Popular vote	155,068	86,885
Percentage	58.4%	32.7%
- Election results by district.

The United States House of Representatives elections in California, 1906 was an election for California's delegation to the United States House of Representatives, which occurred as part of the general election of the House of Representatives on November 6, 1906. All eight districts remained Republican.

== Overview ==
United States House of Representatives elections in California, 1906
Party	Votes	Percentage	Seats
Republican	155,068	58.4%	8
Democratic	86,885	32.7%	0
Socialist	16,052	6.1%	0
Prohibition	3,686	1.4%	0
Independence League	3,614	1.4%	0
Totals	265,305	100.0%	8

== Results ==
=== District 1 ===
California's 1st congressional district election, 1906
Party	Candidate	Votes	%
Republican	William F. Englebright	18,125	95.2
Democratic	F. W. Taft	539	2.8
Socialist	J. C. Weybright	325	1.7
Prohibition	R. L. Webb	51	0.3
Total votes		19,040	100.0
Turnout			
Republican hold			

=== District 2 ===
California's 2nd congressional district election, 1906
Party	Candidate	Votes	%
Republican	Duncan E. McKinlay (incumbent)	23,411	51.8
Democratic	W. A. Beard	20,262	44.8
Socialist	A. J. Gaylord	1,524	3.4
Total votes		45,197	100.0
Turnout			
Republican hold			

=== District 3 ===
California's 3rd congressional district election, 1906
Party	Candidate	Votes	%
Republican	Joseph R. Knowland (incumbent)	21,510	60.0
Democratic	Hugh W. Brunk	7,716	21.5
Independence	Charles C. Boynton	3,614	10.1
Socialist	William McDevitt	2,514	7.0
Prohibition	T. H. Montgomery	482	1.4
Total votes		35,836	100.0
Turnout			
Republican hold			

=== District 4 ===
California's 4th congressional district election, 1906
Party	Candidate	Votes	%
Republican	Julius Kahn (incumbent)	5,678	62.4
Democratic	David S. Hirshberg	3,016	33.2
Socialist	Oliver Everett	399	4.4
Total votes		9,093	100.0
Turnout			
Republican hold			

=== District 5 ===
California's 5th congressional district election, 1906
Party	Candidate	Votes	%
Republican	Everis A. Hayes (incumbent)	22,530	53.4
Democratic	Hiram G. Davis	17,295	41.0
Socialist	Joseph Lawrence	2,343	5.6
Total votes		42,168	100.0
Turnout			
Republican hold			

=== District 6 ===
California's 6th congressional district election, 1906
Party	Candidate	Votes	%
Republican	James C. Needham (incumbent)	18,928	55.6
Democratic	Harry A. Greene	12,868	37.8
Socialist	Richard Kirk	1,303	3.8
Prohibition	Herman E. Burbank	964	2.8
Total votes		34,063	100.0
Turnout			
Republican hold			

=== District 7 ===
California's 7th congressional district election, 1906
Party	Candidate	Votes	%
Republican	James McLachlan (incumbent)	22,338	56.8
Democratic	Robert G. Laucks	11,197	28.4
Socialist	Claude Riddle	3,641	9.2
Prohibition	Levi D. Johnson	2,189	5.6
Total votes		39,365	100.0
Turnout			
Republican hold			

=== District 8 ===
California's 8th congressional district election, 1906
Party	Candidate	Votes	%
Republican	Sylvester C. Smith (incumbent)	22,548	55.6
Democratic	Charles A. Barlow	13,992	34.5
Socialist	Noble A. Richardson	4,003	9.9
Total votes		40,543	100.0
Turnout			
Republican hold			

== See also ==
- 60th United States Congress
- Political party strength in California
- Political party strength in U.S. states
- United States House of Representatives elections, 1906
