= 1908 United States House of Representatives elections in California =

United States House of Representatives elections in California, 1908
- November 3, 1908

All 8 California seats to the United States House of Representatives
	Majority party	Minority party
Party	Republican	Democratic
Last election	8	0
Seats won	8	0
Seat change	Steady	Steady
Popular vote	201,206	135,412
Percentage	53.7%	36.1%
- Election results by district.

The United States House of Representatives elections in California, 1908 was an election for California's delegation to the United States House of Representatives, which occurred as part of the general election of the House of Representatives on November 3, 1908. All eight districts remained Republican.

== Overview ==
United States House of Representatives elections in California, 1908
Party	Votes	Percentage	Seats
Republican	201,206	53.7%	8
Democratic	135,412	36.1%	0
Socialist	27,314	7.3%	0
Prohibition	9,155	2.4%	0
Independence League	1,714	0.5%	0
Totals	374,801	100.0%	8

== Results ==
=== District 1 ===
California's 1st congressional district election, 1908
Party	Candidate	Votes	%
Republican	William F. Englebright (incumbent)	20,624	54.1
Democratic	E. W. Holland	14,031	36.8
Socialist	D. N. Cunningham	2,898	7.6
Prohibition	W. P. Fassett	546	1.4
Total votes		38,099	100.0
Turnout			
Republican hold			

=== District 2 ===
California's 2nd congressional district election, 1908
Party	Candidate	Votes	%
Republican	Duncan E. McKinlay (incumbent)	28,627	57.5
Democratic	W. K. Hays	19,193	38.5
Socialist	A. J. Gaylord	2,003	4.0
Total votes		49,823	100.0
Turnout			
Republican hold			

=== District 3 ===
California's 3rd congressional district election, 1908
Party	Candidate	Votes	%
Republican	Joseph R. Knowland (incumbent)	27,857	64.1
Democratic	George Peckham	9,889	22.8
Socialist	O. W. Philbrick	4,052	9.3
Independence	John A. Sands	923	2.1
Prohibition	T. H. Montgomery	717	1.7
Total votes		43,438	100.0
Turnout			
Republican hold			

=== District 4 ===
California's 4th congressional district election, 1908
Party	Candidate	Votes	%
Republican	Julius Kahn (incumbent)	9,202	52.7
Democratic	James G. Maguire	7,497	42.9
Socialist	K. J. Doyle	699	4.0
Prohibition	William N. Meserve	60	0.3
Total votes		17,458	100.0
Turnout			
Republican hold			

=== District 5 ===
California's 5th congressional district election, 1908
Party	Candidate	Votes	%
Republican	Everis A. Hayes (incumbent)	28,127	49.1
Democratic	George A. Tracy	24,531	42.8
Socialist	E. H. Misner	3,640	6.3
Prohibition	Walter E. Vail	1,045	1.8
Total votes		57,343	100.0
Turnout			
Republican hold			

=== District 6 ===
California's 6th congressional district election, 1908
Party	Candidate	Votes	%
Republican	James C. Needham (incumbent)	21,323	52.0
Democratic	Fred P. Feliz	15,868	38.7
Socialist	W. M. Pattison	2,288	5.6
Prohibition	James W. Webb	1,509	3.7
Total votes		40,988	100.0
Turnout			
Republican hold			

=== District 7 ===
California's 7th congressional district election, 1908
Party	Candidate	Votes	%
Republican	James McLachlan (incumbent)	37,244	51.9
Democratic	Jud R. Rush	25,445	35.4
Socialist	A. R. Holston	4,432	6.2
Prohibition	Marshall W. Atwood	3,899	5.4
Independence	F. G. Hentig	791	1.1
Total votes		71,811	100.0
Turnout			
Republican hold			

=== District 8 ===
California's 8th congressional district election, 1908
Party	Candidate	Votes	%
Republican	Sylvester C. Smith (incumbent)	28,202	50.5
Democratic	William G. Irving	18,958	33.9
Socialist	George A. Garrett	7,302	13.1
Prohibition	James S. Edwards	1,379	2.5
Total votes		45,831	100.0
Turnout			
Republican hold			

== See also ==
- 61st United States Congress
- Political party strength in California
- Political party strength in U.S. states
- United States House of Representatives elections, 1908
