= 1898 United States House of Representatives elections in California =

United States House of Representatives elections in California, 1898
- November 8, 1898

All 7 California seats to the United States House of Representatives
	Majority party	Minority party	Third party
Party	Republican	Democratic	Populist
Last election	3	2	2
Seats won	6	1	0
Seat change	▲3	▼1	▼2
Popular vote	139,382	86,927	41,179
Percentage	51.0%	31.8%	15.1%
- Election results by district.

The United States House of Representatives elections in California, 1898 was an election for California's delegation to the United States House of Representatives, which occurred as part of the general election of the House of Representatives on November 8, 1898. Republicans took an open Democratic seat and defeated the two Populist incumbents.

== Overview ==
United States House of Representatives elections in California, 1898
Party	Votes	Percentage	Seats	+/–
Republican	139,382	51.0%	6	+3
Democratic	86,927	31.8%	1	-1
Populist	41,179	15.1%	0	-2
Socialist Labor	4,979	1.8%	0	0
Independent	594	0.2%	0	0
Totals	273,061	100.0%	7	—

== Delegation Composition ==
Pre-election	Seats
Republican-Held	3
Democratic-Held	2
Populist-Held	2

Post-election	Seats
Republican-Held	6
Democratic-Held	1

== Results ==
=== District 1 ===
California's 1st congressional district election, 1898
Party	Candidate	Votes	%
Republican	John All Barham (incumbent)	19,598	51.8
Democratic	Emmet Seawell	18,244	48.2
Total votes		37,842	100.0
Turnout			
Republican hold			

=== District 2 ===
California's 2nd congressional district election, 1898
Party	Candidate	Votes	%
Democratic	Marion De Vries (incumbent)	25,196	55.3
Republican	Frank D. Ryan	20,400	44.7
Total votes		45,596	100.0
Turnout			
Democratic hold			

=== District 3 ===
California's 3rd congressional district election, 1898
Party	Candidate	Votes	%
Republican	Victor H. Metcalf	20,592	57.3
Democratic	John A. Jones	14,051	39.1
Socialist Labor	Thomas F. Burns	1,309	3.6
Total votes		35,952	100.0
Turnout			
Republican hold			

=== District 4 ===
California's 4th congressional district election, 1898
Party	Candidate	Votes	%
Republican	Julius Kahn	13,695	50.0
Democratic	James H. Barry	12,084	44.1
Socialist Labor	W. J. Martin	1,006	3.7
Independent	Joseph P. Kelly	594	2.2
Total votes		27,379	100.0
Turnout			
Republican gain from Democratic			

=== District 5 ===
California's 5th congressional district election, 1898
Party	Candidate	Votes	%
Republican	Eugene F. Loud (incumbent)	20,254	51.8
Democratic	William Craig	17,352	44.3
Socialist Labor	E. T. Kingsley	1,532	3.9
Total votes		39,138	100.0
Turnout			
Republican hold			

=== District 6 ===
California's 6th congressional district election, 1898
Party	Candidate	Votes	%
Republican	Russell J. Waters	24,050	52.6
Populist	Charles A. Barlow (incumbent)	20,499	44.9
Socialist Labor	James T. Van Ransselaer	1,132	2.5
Total votes		45,681	100.0
Turnout			
Republican gain from Populist			

=== District 7 ===
California's 7th congressional district election, 1898
Party	Candidate	Votes	%
Republican	James C. Needham	20,793	50.1
Populist	Curtis H. Castle (incumbent)	20,680	49.9
Total votes		41,473	100.0
Turnout			
Republican gain from Populist			

== See also ==
- 56th United States Congress
- Political party strength in California
- Political party strength in U.S. states
- United States House of Representatives elections, 1898
