= 1888 United States House of Representatives elections in California =

United States House of Representatives elections in California, 1888
- November 6, 1888

All 6 California seats to the United States House of Representatives
	Majority party	Minority party
Party	Republican	Democratic
Last election	4	2
Seats won	4	2
Seat change	Steady	Steady
Popular vote	126,646	116,069
Percentage	51.0%	46.7%
- Election results by district.

The United States House of Representatives elections in California, 1888 was an election for California's delegation to the United States House of Representatives, which occurred as part of the general election of the House of Representatives on November 6, 1888. Republicans and Democrats each swapped a district.

== Overview ==
United States House of Representatives elections in California, 1888
Party	Votes	Percentage	Seats
Republican	126,646	51.0%	4
Democratic	116,069	46.7%	2
Prohibition	3,945	1.6%	0
Independent	1,517	0.6%	0
American Party	323	0.2%	0
Totals	248,500	100.0%	6

== Results ==
=== District 1 ===
California's 1st congressional district election, 1888
Party	Candidate	Votes	%
Republican	John J. De Haven	19,345	49.9
Democratic	Thomas Larkin Thompson (inc.)	19,019	49.0
Independent	W. D. Reynolds	428	1.1
Total votes		38,792	100.0
Turnout			
Republican gain from Democratic			

=== District 2 ===
California's 2nd congressional district election, 1888
Party	Candidate	Votes	%
Democratic	Marion Biggs (incumbent)	19,064	50.6
Republican	John A. Eagon	17,541	46.6
Prohibition	S. M. McLean	913	2.4
Independent	J. F. McSwain	138	0.4
Total votes		37,656	100.0
Turnout			
Democratic hold			

=== District 3 ===
California's 3rd congressional district election, 1888
Party	Candidate	Votes	%
Republican	Joseph McKenna (incumbent)	19,912	56.0
Democratic	Ben Morgan	14,633	41.2
Prohibition	W. W. Smith	657	1.9
Independent	S. Solon Hall	338	1.0
Total votes		35,540	100.0
Turnout			
Republican hold			

=== District 4 ===
California's 4th congressional district election, 1888
Party	Candidate	Votes	%
Republican	William W. Morrow (incumbent)	14,217	50.8
Democratic	Robert Ferral	13,624	48.6
American Party	Frank M. Pixley	173	0.6
Total votes		28,014	100.0
Turnout			
Republican hold			

=== District 5 ===
California's 5th congressional district election, 1888
Party	Candidate	Votes	%
Democratic	Thomas J. Clunie	20,276	49.3
Republican	Timothy Guy Phelps	20,225	49.2
Independent	Henry French	613	1.5
Total votes		41,114	100.0
Turnout			
Democratic gain from Republican			

=== District 6 ===
California's 6th congressional district election, 1888
Party	Candidate	Votes	%
Republican	William Vandever (incumbent)	35,406	52.5
Democratic	Reel B. Terry	29,453	43.7
Prohibition	J. G. Miller	2,375	3.5
American Party	Alfred Daggett	150	0.2
Total votes		67,384	100.0
Turnout			
Republican hold			

== See also ==
- 51st United States Congress
- Political party strength in California
- Political party strength in U.S. states
- United States House of Representatives elections, 1888
