= 1900 United States House of Representatives elections in California =

United States election

United States House of Representatives elections in California, 1900
- November 6, 1900

All 7 California seats to the United States House of Representatives
	Majority party	Minority party
Party	Republican	Democratic
Last election	6	1
Seats before	7	0
Seats won	7	0
Seat change	Steady	Steady
Popular vote	157,440	120,410
Percentage	54.0%	41.3%
- Election results by district.

The United States House of Representatives elections in California, 1900 was an election for California's delegation to the United States House of Representatives, which occurred as part of the general election of the House of Representatives on November 6, 1900. California's seven-seat delegation remained all-Republican.

== Overview ==
United States House of Representatives elections in California, 1900
Party	Votes	Percentage	Seats
Republican	157,440	54.0%	7
Democratic	120,410	41.3%	0
Socialist	8,567	2.9%	0
Prohibition	4,130	1.4%	0
Independent	1,116	0.4%	0
Totals	291,663	100.0%	7

== Results ==
=== District 1 ===
California's 1st congressional district election, 1900
Party	Candidate	Votes	%
Republican	Frank Coombs	21,227	55.3
Democratic	James F. Farraher	16,270	42.4
Socialist	William Morgan	599	1.6
Prohibition	Charles T. Clark	310	0.8
Total votes		38,406	100.0
Turnout			
Republican hold			

=== District 2 ===
California's 2nd congressional district election, 1900
Party	Candidate	Votes	%
Republican	Samuel D. Woods	23,019	50.4
Democratic	J. D. Sproul	21,851	47.9
Socialist	W. F. Lockwood	402	0.9
Prohibition	W. H. Barron	371	0.8
Total votes		45,643	100.0
Turnout			
Republican hold			

=== District 3 ===
California's 3rd congressional district election, 1900
Party	Candidate	Votes	%
Republican	Victor H. Metcalf (incumbent)	22,109	58.9
Democratic	Frank Freeman	14,408	38.4
Socialist	R. A. Dague	596	1.6
Prohibition	Alvin W. Holt	431	1.1
Total votes		37,544	100.0
Turnout			
Republican hold			

=== District 4 ===
California's 4th congressional district election, 1900
Party	Candidate	Votes	%
Republican	Julius Kahn (incumbent)	17,111	55.2
Democratic	R. Porter Ashe	11,742	37.8
Independent	C. C. O'Donnell	1,116	3.6
Socialist	G. B. Benham	969	3.1
Prohibition	Joseph Rowell	84	0.3
Total votes		31,022	100.0
Turnout			
Republican hold			

=== District 5 ===
California's 5th congressional district election, 1900
Party	Candidate	Votes	%
Republican	Eugene F. Loud (incumbent)	23,443	55.7
Democratic	J. H. Henry	17,365	41.3
Socialist	C. H. King	942	2.2
Prohibition	Fred E. Caton	322	0.8
Total votes		42,072	100.0
Turnout			
Republican hold			

=== District 6 ===
California's 6th congressional district election, 1900
Party	Candidate	Votes	%
Republican	James McLachlan	27,081	51.8
Democratic	William Graves	19,793	37.9
Socialist	H. G. Wilshire	3,674	7.0
Prohibition	James Campbell	1,693	3.2
Total votes		52,241	100.0
Turnout			
Republican hold			

=== District 7 ===
California's 7th congressional district election, 1900
Party	Candidate	Votes	%
Republican	James C. Needham (incumbent)	23,450	52.4
Democratic	W. D. Crichton	18,981	42.4
Socialist	Noble A. Richardson	1,385	3.1
Prohibition	A. H. Hensley	919	2.1
Total votes		44,735	100.0
Turnout			
Republican hold			

== See also ==
- 57th United States Congress
- Political party strength in California
- Political party strength in U.S. states
- United States House of Representatives elections, 1900
