= 1892 United States House of Representatives elections in California =

United States House of Representatives elections in California, 1892
- November 8, 1892

All 7 California seats to the United States House of Representatives
	Majority party	Minority party	Third party
Party	Republican	Democratic	Populist
Last election	4	2	n/a
Seats won	3	3	1
Seat change	▼1	▲1	▲1
Popular vote	105,040	92,787	35,763
Percentage	43.7%	38.6%	14.9%
- Election results by district.

The United States House of Representatives elections in California, 1892 was an election for California's delegation to the United States House of Representatives, which occurred as part of the general election of the House of Representatives on November 8, 1892. California gained one seat as a result of the 1890 census, which was won by the Populist Party. Democrats also picked up an open Republican seat.

== Overview ==
United States House of Representatives elections in California, 1892
Party	Votes	Percentage	Seats	+/–
Republican	105,040	43.7%	3	-1
Democratic	92,787	38.6%	3	+1
Populist	35,763	14.9%	1	+1
Prohibition	6,694	2.8%	0	0
Independent	122	0.1%	0	0
Totals	240,406	100.0%	7	+1

== Delegation Composition ==
Pre-election	Seats
Republican-Held	4
Democratic-Held	2

Post-election	Seats
Democratic-Held	3
Republican-Held	3
Populist-Held	1

== Results ==
=== District 1 ===
California's 1st congressional district election, 1892
Party	Candidate	Votes	%
Democratic	Thomas J. Geary (incumbent)	19,308	56.8
Republican	Edward W. Davis	13,123	38.6
Populist	C. C. Swafford	1,546	4.6
Total votes		33,977	100.0
Turnout			
Democratic hold			

=== District 2 ===
California's 2nd congressional district election, 1892
Party	Candidate	Votes	%
Republican	Anthony Caminetti (incumbent)	20,741	53.3
Democratic	John F. Davis	16,781	43.1
Prohibition	Chauncey H. Dunn	1,307	3.4
Independent	J. H. White	122	0.3
Total votes		38,951	100.0
Turnout			
Republican hold			

=== District 3 ===
California's 3rd congressional district election, 1892
Party	Candidate	Votes	%
Republican	Samuel G. Hilborn	13,163	43.2
Democratic	Warren B. English	13,138	43.1
Populist	J. L. Lyon	3,495	11.5
Prohibition	L. B. Scranton	671	2.2
Total votes		30,467	100.0
Turnout			
Republican hold			

=== District 4 ===
California's 4th congressional district election, 1892
Party	Candidate	Votes	%
Democratic	James G. Maguire	14,997	49.2
Republican	Charles O. Alexander	13,226	43.4
Populist	Edgar P. Burman	1,980	6.5
Prohibition	Henry Collins	296	1.0
Total votes		30,499	100.0
Turnout			
Democratic gain from Republican			

=== District 5 ===
California's 5th congressional district election, 1892
Party	Candidate	Votes	%
Republican	Eugene F. Loud (incumbent)	14,660	46.4
Democratic	J. W. Ryland	13,694	43.3
Populist	Jonas J. Morrison	2,484	7.9
Prohibition	William Kelly	771	2.4
Total votes		31,609	100.0
Turnout			
Republican hold			

=== District 6 ===
California's 6th congressional district election, 1892
Party	Candidate	Votes	%
Populist	Marion Cannon	20,680	56.3
Republican	Hervey Lindley	14,271	38.8
Prohibition	O. R. Dougherty	1,805	4.9
Total votes		36,756	100.0
Turnout			
Populist win (new seat)			

=== District 7 ===
California's 7th congressional district election, 1892
Party	Candidate	Votes	%
Republican	William W. Bowers (incumbent)	15,856	41.6
Democratic	Olin Welborn	14,869	39.0
Populist	Hiram Hamilton	5,578	14.6
Prohibition	M. B. Harris	1,844	4.8
Total votes		38,147	100.0
Turnout			
Republican hold			

== See also ==
- 53rd United States Congress
- Political party strength in California
- Political party strength in U.S. states
- United States House of Representatives elections, 1892
