= 1910 United States House of Representatives elections in California =

United States House of Representatives elections in California, 1910
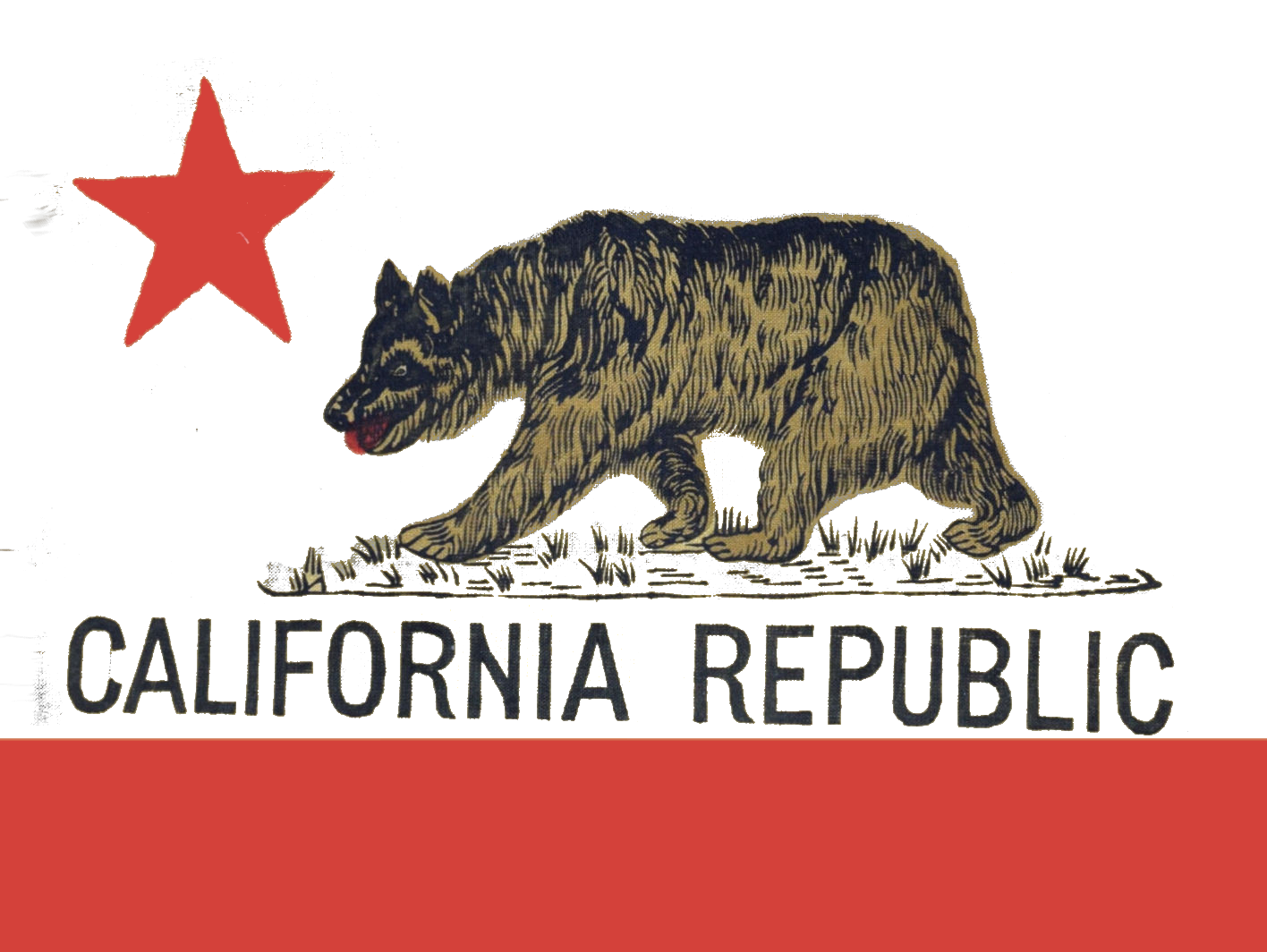
- November 8, 1910

All 8 California seats to the United States House of Representatives
	Majority party	Minority party
Party	Republican	Democratic
Last election	8	0
Seats won	7	1
Seat change	▼1	▲1
Popular vote	204,014	111,620
Percentage	56.2%	30.8%
- Election results by district.

The United States House of Representatives elections in California, 1910 was an election for California's delegation to the United States House of Representatives, which occurred as part of the general election of the House of Representatives on November 8, 1910. Complete Republican dominance of California's congressional delegation ended when Democrats narrowly won one district.

== Overview ==
United States House of Representatives elections in California, 1910
Party	Votes	Percentage	Seats	+/–
Republican	204,014	56.2%	7	-1
Democratic	111,620	30.8%	1	+1
Socialist	40,936	11.3%	0	0
Prohibition	6,208	1.7%	0	0
Totals	362,778	100.0%	8	—

== Delegation composition ==
Pre-election	Seats
Republican-Held	8

Post-election	Seats
Republican-Held	7
Democratic-Held	1

== Results ==
=== District 1 ===
California's 1st congressional district election, 1910
Party	Candidate	Votes	%
Democratic	John E. Raker	16,704	45.4
Republican	William F. Englebright (incumbent)	16,570	45.1
Socialist	William Morgan	3,231	8.8
Prohibition	C. H. Essex	259	0.7
Total votes		37,064	100.0
Turnout			
Democratic gain from Republican			

=== District 2 ===
California's 2nd congressional district election, 1910
Party	Candidate	Votes	%
Republican	William Kent	25,346	50.1
Democratic	I. G. Zumwalt	22,229	44.0
Socialist	W. H. Ferber	2,647	5.2
Prohibition	Henry P. Stipp	329	0.7
Total votes		50,451	100.0
Turnout			
Republican hold			

=== District 3 ===
California's 3rd congressional district election, 1910
Party	Candidate	Votes	%
Republican	Joseph R. Knowland* (incumbent)	34,291	81.9
Socialist	Seymour Miller	6,653	15.9
Prohibition	James N. Christian	906	2.2
Total votes		41,850	100.0
Turnout			
Republican hold			

- Knowland was the nominee for both the Republican and Democratic Parties

=== District 4 ===
California's 4th congressional district election, 1910
Party	Candidate	Votes	%
Republican	Julius Kahn (incumbent)	10,188	56.5
Democratic	Walter Macarthur	6,636	36.8
Socialist	Austin Lewis	1,178	6.5
Prohibition	E. F. Dinsmore	35	0.2
Total votes		18,037	100.0
Turnout			
Republican hold			

=== District 5 ===
California's 5th congressional district election, 1910
Party	Candidate	Votes	%
Republican	Everis A. Hayes (incumbent)	33,265	59.4
Democratic	Thomas E. Hayden	15,345	27.4
Socialist	E. L. Reguin	7,052	12.6
Prohibition	T. E. Caton	359	0.6
Total votes		56,021	100.0
Turnout			
Republican hold			

=== District 6 ===
California's 6th congressional district election, 1910
Party	Candidate	Votes	%
Republican	James C. Needham (incumbent)	19,717	47.3
Democratic	A. L. Cowell	18,408	44.2
Socialist	Richard Kirk	2,568	6.2
Prohibition	Ira E. Surface	951	2.3
Total votes		41,644	100.0
Turnout			
Republican hold			

=== District 7 ===
California's 7th congressional district election, 1910
Party	Candidate	Votes	%
Republican	William Stephens (incumbent)	36,435	58.7
Democratic	Lorin A. Handley	13,340	21.5
Socialist	Thomas V. Williams	10,305	16.6
Prohibition	C. V. LeFontaine	1,990	3.2
Total votes		62,070	100.0
Turnout			
Republican hold			

=== District 8 ===
California's 8th congressional district election, 1910
Party	Candidate	Votes	%
Republican	Sylvester C. Smith (incumbent)	28,202	50.5
Democratic	William G. Irving	18,958	33.9
Socialist	George A. Garrett	7,302	13.1
Prohibition	James S. Edwards	1,379	2.5
Total votes		45,831	100.0
Turnout			
Republican hold			

== See also ==
- 62nd United States Congress
- Political party strength in California
- Political party strength in U.S. states
- United States House of Representatives elections, 1910
