= 1902 United States House of Representatives elections in California =

United States House of Representatives elections in California, 1902
- November 4, 1902

All 8 California seats to the United States House of Representatives
	Majority party	Minority party
Party	Republican	Democratic
Last election	7	0
Seats won	5	3
Seat change	▼2	▲3
Popular vote	152,373	126,290
Percentage	52.36%	43.40%
- Election results by district.

An election was held for California's delegation to the United States House of Representatives as part of the general election of the House of Representatives on November 4, 1902. California gained one seat as a result of the 1900 census, which Republicans won. However, of the existing districts, Democrats won three Republican-held districts.

== Overview ==
United States House of Representatives elections in California, 1902
Party	Votes	Percentage	Seats	+/–
Republican	152,373	52.36%	5	–2
Democratic	126,290	43.40%	3	+3
Socialist	8,500	2.92%	0	0
Prohibition	3,860	1.33%	0	0
Totals	291,023	100.00%	8	—

== Delegation composition ==
Pre-election	Seats
Republican-Held	7

Post-election	Seats
Republican-Held	5
Democratic-Held	3

== Results ==
=== District 1 ===
California's 1st congressional district election, 1902
Party	Candidate	Votes	%
Republican	James Gillett	21,268	50.5
Democratic	Anthony Caminetti	19,696	46.7
Socialist	M. F. Shore	810	1.9
Prohibition	W. O. Clark	362	0.9
Total votes		42,136	100.0
Turnout			
Republican hold			

=== District 2 ===
California's 2nd congressional district election, 1902
Party	Candidate	Votes	%
Democratic	Theodore A. Bell	21,536	49.2
Republican	Frank Coombs (incumbent)	21,181	48.3
Socialist	G. H. Rogers	731	1.7
Prohibition	W. P. Fassett	367	0.8
Total votes		43,815	100.0
Turnout			
Democratic gain from Republican			

=== District 3 ===
California's 3rd congressional district election, 1902
Party	Candidate	Votes	%
Republican	Victor H. Metcalf (incumbent)	20,532	66.2
Democratic	Calvin B. White	8,574	27.7
Socialist	M. W. Wilkins	1,556	5.0
Prohibition	T. H. Montgomery	338	1.1
Total votes		31,000	100.0
Turnout			
Republican hold			

=== District 4 ===
California's 4th congressional district election, 1902
Party	Candidate	Votes	%
Democratic	Edward J. Livernash	16,146	49.2
Republican	Julius Kahn (incumbent)	16,005	48.7
Socialist	William Costley	616	1.9
Prohibition	Joseph Rowell	69	0.2
Total votes		16,836	100.0
Turnout			
Democratic gain from Republican			

=== District 5 ===
California's 5th congressional district election, 1902
Party	Candidate	Votes	%
Democratic	William J. Wynn	22,712	56.5
Republican	Eugene F. Loud (incumbent)	16,577	41.2
Socialist	Joseph Lawrence	620	1.5
Prohibition	Fred E. Caton	301	0.8
Total votes		40,210	100.0
Turnout			
Democratic gain from Republican			

=== District 6 ===
California's 6th congressional district election, 1902
Party	Candidate	Votes	%
Republican	James C. Needham (incumbent)	17,268	53.5
Democratic	Gaston M. Ashe	13,732	42.5
Socialist	J. L. Cobb	815	2.5
Prohibition	Joel H. Smith	466	1.4
Total votes		32,281	100.0
Turnout			
Republican hold			

=== District 7 ===
California's 7th congressional district election, 1902
Party	Candidate	Votes	%
Republican	James McLachlan (incumbent)	19,407	64.8
Democratic	Carl A. Johnson	8,075	27.0
Socialist	George H. Hewes	1,261	4.2
Prohibition	Frederick F. Wheeler	1,195	4.0
Total votes		30,638	100.0
Turnout			
Republican hold			

=== District 8 ===
California's 8th congressional district election, 1902
Party	Candidate	Votes	%
Republican	Milton J. Daniels	20,135	55.6
Democratic	William E. Smythe	15,819	40.8
Socialist	Noble A. Richardson	2,091	5.4
Prohibition	Ellsworth Leonardson	762	2.0
Total votes		38,807	100.0
Turnout			
Republican win (new seat)			

== See also ==
- 58th United States Congress
- Political party strength in California
- Political party strength in U.S. states
- United States House of Representatives elections, 1902
