= 1890 United States House of Representatives elections in California =

United States House of Representatives elections in California, 1890
- November 4, 1890

All 6 California seats to the United States House of Representatives
	Majority party	Minority party
Party	Republican	Democratic
Last election	4	2
Seats before	3	3
Seats won	4	2
Seat change	▲1	▼1
Popular vote	128,061	114,869
Percentage	51.1%	45.8%
- Election results by district.

The United States House of Representatives elections in California, 1890 was an election for California's delegation to the United States House of Representatives, which occurred as part of the general election of the House of Representatives on November 4, 1890. Republicans picked up one Democratic-held district.

== Overview ==
United States House of Representatives elections in California, 1890
Party	Votes	Percentage	Seats	+/–
Republican	128,061	51.1%	4	+1
Democratic	114,869	45.8%	2	-1
Prohibition	5,625	2.2%	0	0
American Party	2,066	0.8%	0	0
Totals	250,621	100.0%	6	—

== Delegation composition ==
Pre-election	Seats
Democratic-Held	3
Republican-Held	3

Post-election	Seats
Republican-Held	4
Democratic-Held	2

== Results ==
=== District 1 ===
California's 1st congressional district election, 1890
Party	Candidate	Votes	%
Democratic	Thomas J. Geary	19,334	49.3
Republican	John All Barham	19,153	48.8
Prohibition	L. B. Scranton	759	1.9
Total votes		39,246	100.0
Turnout			
Democratic hold			

=== District 2 ===
California's 2nd congressional district election, 1890
Party	Candidate	Votes	%
Democratic	Anthony Caminetti	18,644	49.0
Republican	George G. Blanchard	18,485	48.6
Prohibition	J. S. Witherell	912	2.4
Total votes		38,041	100.0
Turnout			
Democratic hold			

=== District 3 ===
California's 3rd congressional district election, 1890
Party	Candidate	Votes	%
Republican	Joseph McKenna (incumbent)	20,834	55.4
Democratic	John P. Irish	15,997	42.5
Prohibition	O. O. Felkner	774	2.1
Total votes		37,605	100.0
Turnout			
Republican hold			

=== District 4 ===
California's 4th congressional district election, 1890
Party	Candidate	Votes	%
Republican	John T. Cutting	13,196	49.2
Democratic	Robert Ferral	12,091	45.1
American Party	Thomas V. Cator	1,492	5.6
Prohibition	Joseph Rowell	50	0.2
Total votes		26,829	100.0
Turnout			
Republican hold			

=== District 5 ===
California's 5th congressional district election, 1890
Party	Candidate	Votes	%
Republican	Eugene F. Loud	22,871	52.8
Democratic	Thomas J. Clunie (incumbent)	19,899	45.9
American Party	E. F. Howe	574	1.3
Total votes		43,344	100.0
Turnout			
Republican gain from Democratic			

=== District 6 ===
California's 6th congressional district election, 1890
Party	Candidate	Votes	%
Republican	William W. Bowers	33,522	51.1
Democratic	W. J. Curtis	28,904	44.1
Prohibition	O. R. Dougherty	3,130	4.8
Total votes		65,556	100.0
Turnout			
Republican hold			

== See also ==
- 52nd United States Congress
- Political party strength in California
- Political party strength in U.S. states
- United States House of Representatives elections, 1890
