= Milton J. Daniels =

American politician

- Portrait by C. M. Bell c. 1903

Member of the U.S. House of Representatives from California's 8th district
- In office March 4, 1903 – March 3, 1905
- Preceded by: Constituency established
- Succeeded by: Sylvester C. Smith

Personal details
- Born: Milton John Daniels; April 18, 1838 Cobleskill, New York, U.S.
- Died: December 1, 1914 (aged 76) Riverside, California, U.S.
- Resting place: Evergreen Cemetery
- Party: Republican
- Occupation: Military officer; horticulturist; banker

Military service
- Branch/service: Union Army
- Years of service: 1861–1865
- Rank: Captain
- Unit: 3rd Minnesota Infantry Regiment; 9th Minnesota Infantry Regiment
- Battles/wars: American Civil War; Dakota War of 1862

Milton John Daniels (April 18, 1838 – December 1, 1914) was an American Civil War veteran and politician who served one term as a U.S. representative from California from 1903 to 1905.

== Biography ==
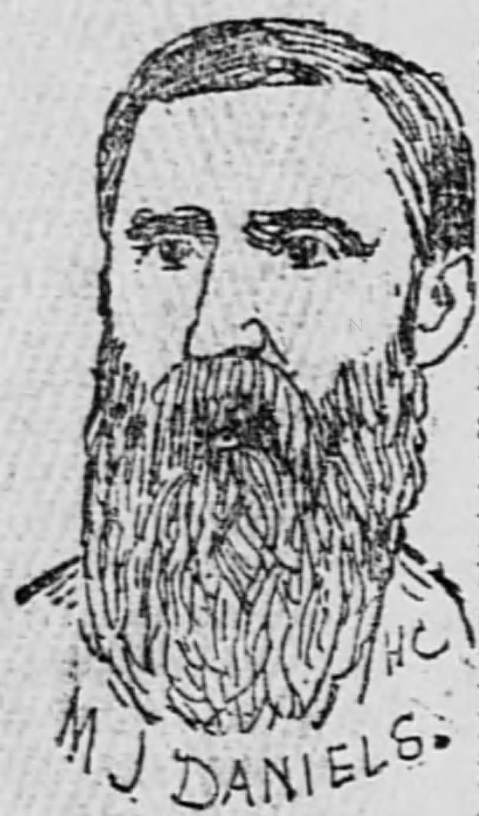
Daniels c. 1887

Born in Cobleskill, New York, Daniels attended the public schools. His family moved to Bradford County, Pennsylvania, and he worked with his father in the lumber business. He moved to Rochester, Minnesota, in 1856, and was appointed deputy postmaster of Rochester in 1859. In 1860 he entered Middlebury Academy, Wyoming County, New York.

During the Civil War he volunteered for service on April 23, 1861. Returning to Minnesota in August 1862, he raised a company and was commissioned second lieutenant of Company F, Ninth Regiment, Minnesota Volunteers. During the Indian War of 1862, he took command of the Third Minnesota Mounted Infantry. In 1863, he joined his company at St. Louis in 1863, and was commissioned captain. In March 1865 he was commissioned captain and commissary of subsistence by President Abraham Lincoln.

After the war he returned to Minnesota and engaged in banking, helping his father to organize the Union Savings Bank of Rochester, Minnesota. Later he served as member of the Minnesota State House of Representatives from 1882 to 1886 and in the Minnesota State Senate from 1886 to 1890. He also served as president of the Minnesota State Board of Asylums for the Insane from 1882 to 1888.

He moved to California in 1889 and located in Riverside where he engaged in horticultural pursuits.

=== Congress ===
Daniels was elected as a Republican to the Fifty-eighth Congress (March 4, 1903 – March 3, 1905). He did not run for renomination to the Fifty-ninth Congress.

=== Later career and death ===
He resumed his occupation as horticulturist in Riverside until his death there on December 1, 1914. He was interred in Evergreen Cemetery.

== Electoral history ==
1902 California's 8th congressional district election
Party	Candidate	Votes	%
Republican	Milton J. Daniels	20,135	55.6%
Democratic	William E. Smythe	15,819	40.8%
Socialist	Noble A. Richardson	2,091	5.4%
Prohibition	Ellsworth Leonardson	762	2.0%
Total votes		38,807	100.0%
Republican win (new seat)			

U.S. House of Representatives
New district	Member of the U.S. House of Representatives from California's 8th congressional district 1903–1905	Succeeded by Sylvester C. Smith
