= Victor H. Metcalf =

American politician

Victor Metcalf
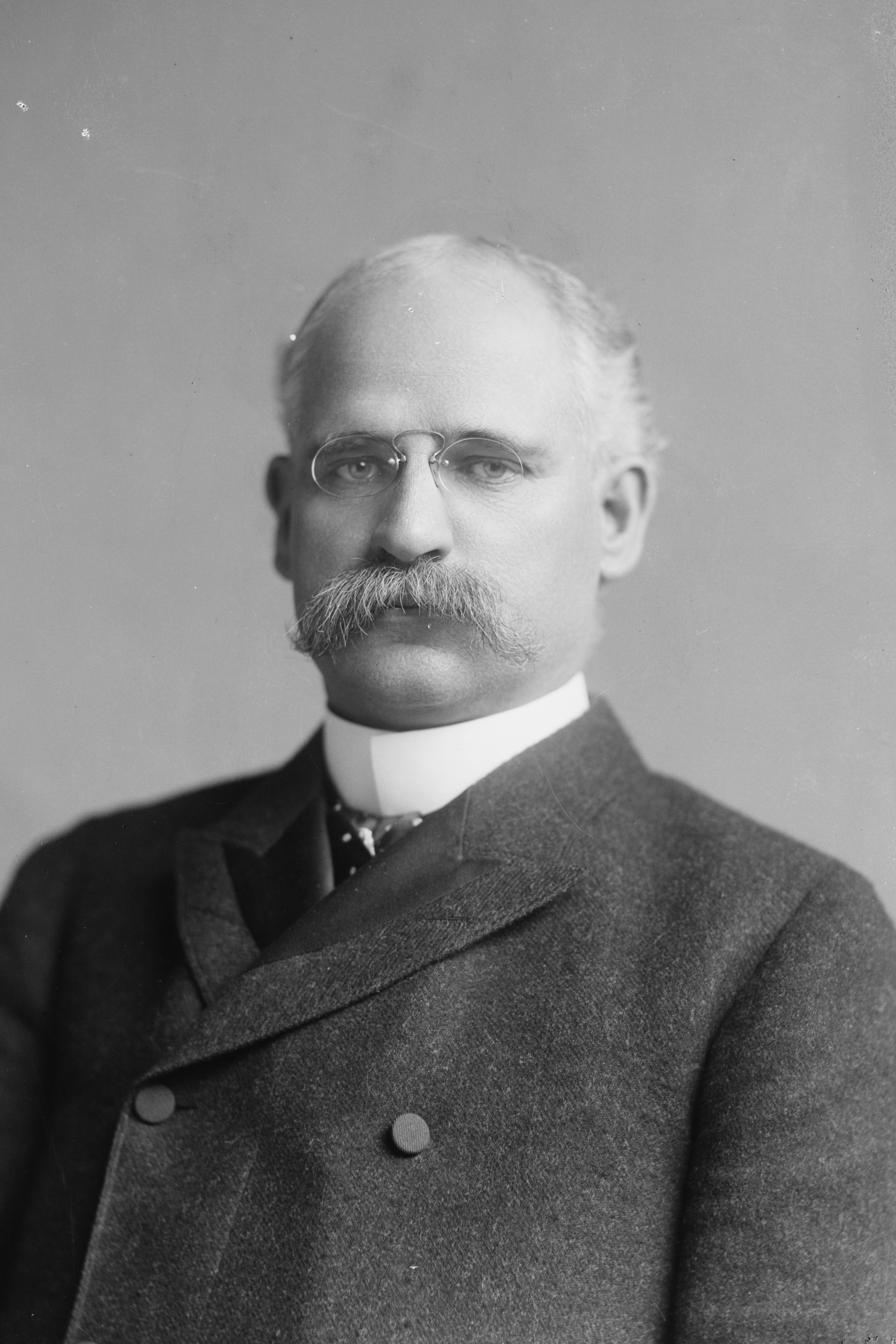
- Portrait by C. M. Bell c. 1901–1903

38th United States Secretary of the Navy
- In office December 17, 1906 – November 30, 1908
- President: Theodore Roosevelt
- Preceded by: Charles Bonaparte
- Succeeded by: Truman Newberry

2nd United States Secretary of Commerce and Labor
- In office July 1, 1904 – December 16, 1906
- President: Theodore Roosevelt
- Preceded by: George B. Cortelyou
- Succeeded by: Oscar Straus

Member of the U.S. House of Representatives from California's 3rd district
- In office March 4, 1899 – July 1, 1904
- Preceded by: Samuel G. Hilborn
- Succeeded by: Joseph R. Knowland

Personal details
- Born: Victor Howard Metcalf; October 10, 1853 Utica, New York, U.S.
- Died: February 20, 1936 (aged 82) New York City, New York, U.S.
- Resting place: Mountain View Cemetery
- Party: Republican
- Spouse: Emily Corinne Nicholson (m. 1881)
- Children: 2
- Education: Yale University (BA); Hamilton College, New York (LLB)

Victor Howard Metcalf (October 10, 1853 – February 20, 1936) was an American politician; he served in President Theodore Roosevelt's cabinet as Secretary of Commerce and Labor, and then as Secretary of the Navy.

== Early life and education ==
Born in Utica, New York, on October 10, 1853, to William and Sarah P. (Howard) Metcalf. He attended the Utica public schools, Utica Free Academy, and Russell's Military Institute at New Haven, Connecticut. In 1872, he entered Yale College where he was a member of the Delta Kappa Epsilon fraternity (Phi chapter); he left in his junior year to attend Yale Law School. He graduated in 1876 and was admitted to the Connecticut bar. In 1877, he continued his legal education at Hamilton College, and was admitted to the New York bar.

== Early career ==
He practiced in Utica in 1877, and then moved to Oakland, California in 1879. His law practice in California handled real property and commercial cases.

== Family ==
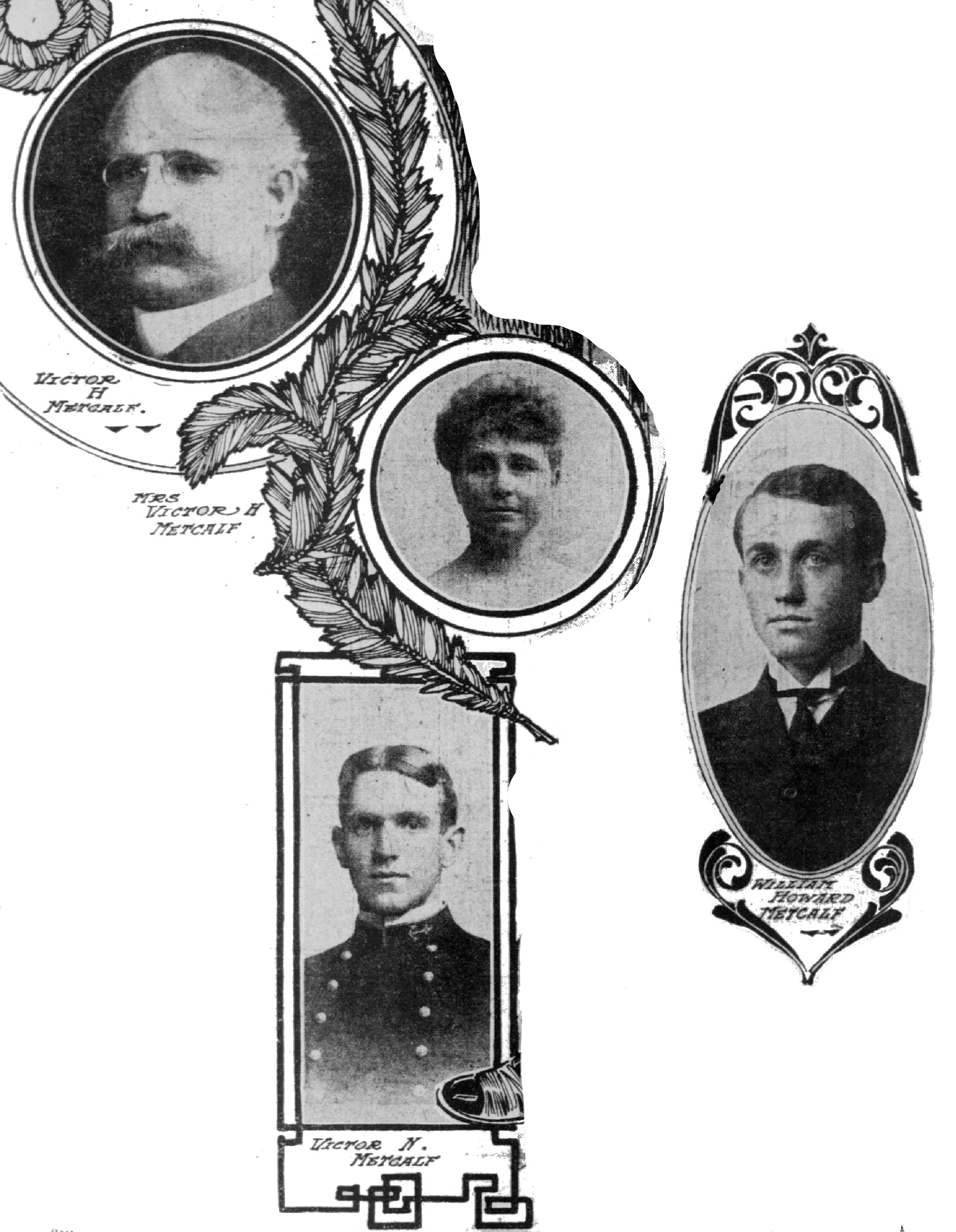
The Metcalf family in 1904

He married Emily Corinne Nicholson in 1881; they had two sons, one of them being educated at the Annapolis Naval Academy, the other becoming a businessman in California.

== Political career ==
=== Congress ===
He was elected as a Republican to the 56th, 57th and 58th United States Congresses, serving from 1899 until 1904. In congress he served on the Naval Affairs and the Ways and Means committees. Metcalf's legislation for reclamation of arid lands put him in touch with President Theodore Roosevelt.

=== Roosevelt cabinet ===
President Roosevelt appointed him, on July 1, 1904, Secretary of Commerce and Labor. As Secretary of Commerce, Roosevelt sent Metcalf to San Francisco in 1905 as an intermediator between the San Francisco school board and 91 Japanese students who were refused entry to public schools. A compromise was reached where the students would be permitted into the public schools while Japan would stop issuing passports to laborers. As President Roosevelt's personal representative, Secretary Metcalf traveled to San Francisco after the 1906 earthquake and fire to survey the damage. He served until December 12, 1906, when he was appointed Secretary of the Navy. During his term, he oversaw the world cruise of the Great White Fleet. The pressures of office took a toll on his health and he resigned as navy secretary November 13, 1908.

== Retirement and death ==
After leaving Roosevelt's Cabinet he returned to Oakland and resumed his practice of law, and engaged in the banking business. Little more than a month after his wife Emily died, Metcalf died in Oakland, February 20, 1936.

He is buried at Mountain View Cemetery, Oakland, Calif.

== Electoral history ==
1898 United States House of Representatives elections in California, District 3
Party	Candidate	Votes	%
Republican	Victor H. Metcalf	20,592	57.3
Democratic	John A. Jones	14,051	39.1
Socialist Labor	Thomas F. Burns	1,309	3.6
Total votes		35,952	100.0
Republican hold			

1900 United States House of Representatives elections in California, District 3
Party	Candidate	Votes	%
Republican	Victor H. Metcalf (Incumbent)	22,109	58.9
Democratic	Frank Freeman	14,408	38.4
Socialist	R. A. Dague	596	1.6
Prohibition	Alvin W. Holt	431	1.1
Total votes		37,544	100.0
Republican hold			

1902 United States House of Representatives elections in California, District 3
Party	Candidate	Votes	%
Republican	Victor H. Metcalf (Incumbent)	20,532	66.2
Democratic	Calvin B. White	8,574	27.7
Socialist	M. W. Wilkins	1,556	5.0
Prohibition	T. H. Montgomery	338	1.1
Total votes		31,000	100.0
Republican hold			

U.S. House of Representatives
Preceded by Samuel G. Hilborn	Member of the U.S. House of Representatives from California's 3rd congressional district 1899–1904	Succeeded by Joseph R. Knowland
Political offices
Preceded by George B. Cortelyou	U.S. Secretary of Commerce and Labor; Served under: Theodore Roosevelt; 1904 – 1906	Succeeded by Oscar S. Straus
Government offices
Preceded by Charles J. Bonaparte	United States Secretary of the Navy; 1906–1908	Succeeded by Truman H. Newberry
