= Eugene F. Loud =

American politician (1847–1908)

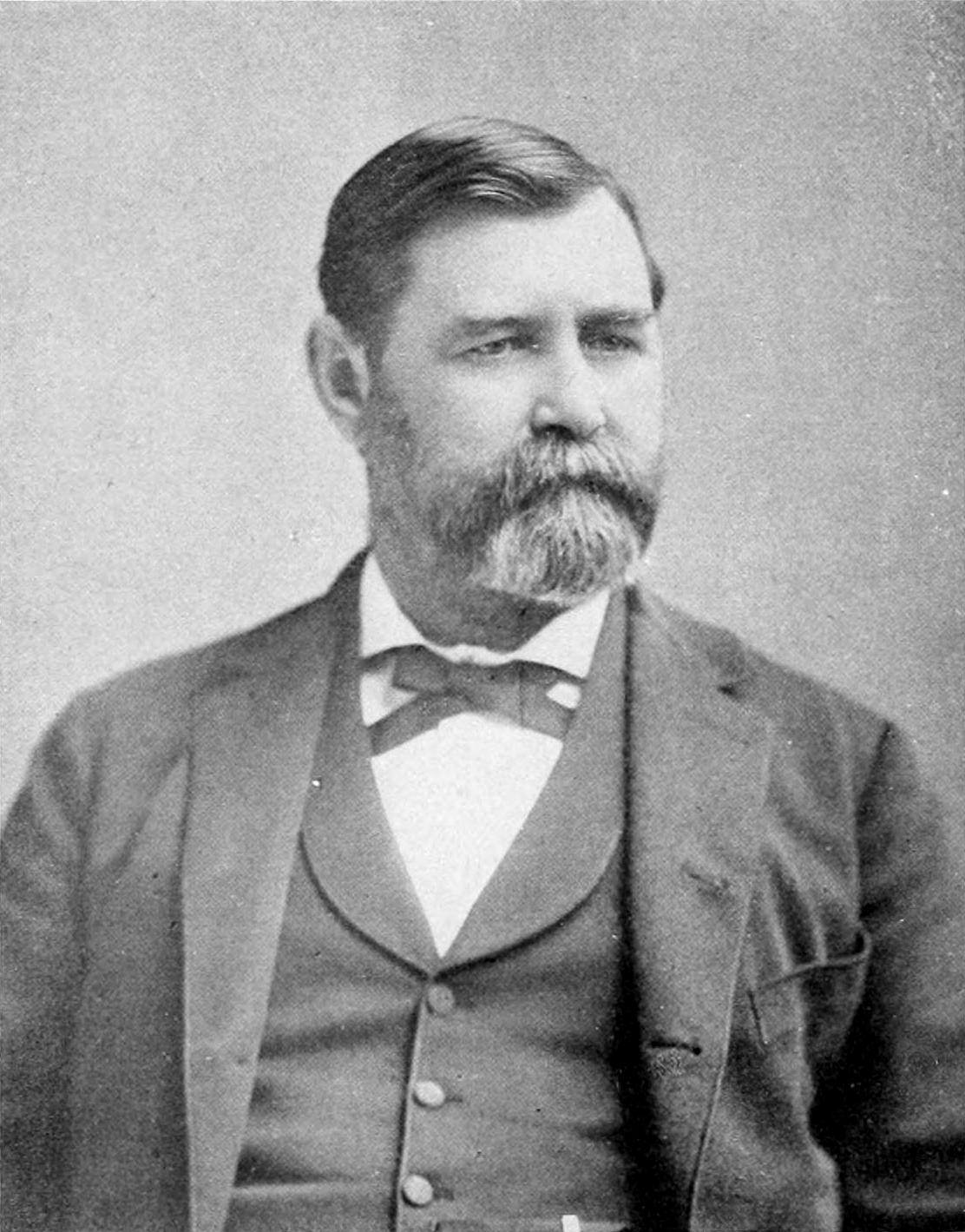
- Loud c. 1896

Member of the U.S. House of Representatives from California's 5th district
- In office March 4, 1891 – March 3, 1903
- Preceded by: Thomas J. Clunie
- Succeeded by: William J. Wynn

Member of the California State Assembly from the 43rd district
- In office January 5, 1885 – January 3, 1887
- Preceded by: District established
- Succeeded by: Luther L. Ewing

Personal details
- Born: Eugene Francis Loud; March 12, 1847 Abington, Massachusetts, U.S.
- Died: December 19, 1908 (aged 61) San Francisco, California, U.S.
- Resting place: Greenlawn Memorial Park, Colma, California, U.S.
- Party: Republican

Eugene Francis Loud (March 12, 1847 – December 19, 1908) was an American politician, lawyer, and merchant. He was a Civil War veteran, who served six terms as a U.S. representative from California from 1891 to 1903.

== Early life ==
Born in Abington, Massachusetts, Loud went to sea and afterward settled in California.

=== Civil War ===
During the Civil War, he enlisted in a California Cavalry Battalion in 1862, which formed a part of the Second Regiment, Massachusetts Volunteer Cavalry.

=== Early career ===
He returned to California, where he engaged in mining and as clerk for fifteen years. He studied law, and served as a clerk in the customs service in San Francisco. He served as a member of the California State Assembly for the 43rd district from 1885 to 1887. He was cashier of the city and county of San Francisco.

== Congress ==
Loud was elected as a Republican to the Fifty-second and to the five succeeding Congresses (March 4, 1891 – March 3, 1903). He served as chairman of the Committee on the Post Office and Post Roads (Fifty-fourth through Fifty-seventh Congresses). In April 1898, Loud was among the six representatives who voted against declaring war on Spain. He was an unsuccessful candidate for reelection in 1902 to the Fifty-eighth Congress. In one of his last acts before leaving office, he voted against the Anarchist Exclusion Act of 1903, the only Republican to do so.

== Death ==
He died in San Francisco, on December 19, 1908. He remains were cremated and the ashes interred in the Odd Fellows Cemetery (which no longer exists). He was re-interred at Greenlawn Memorial Park, Colma.

== Electoral history ==
1890 United States House of Representatives elections in California
Party	Candidate	Votes	%
Republican	Eugene F. Loud	22,871	52.8
Democratic	Thomas J. Clunie (Incumbent)	19,899	45.9
Socialist	E. F. Howe	574	1.3
Total votes		43,344	100.0
Turnout			
Republican gain from Democratic			

1892 United States House of Representatives elections in California
Party	Candidate	Votes	%
Republican	Eugene F. Loud (Incumbent)	14,660	46.4
Democratic	J. W. Ryland	13,694	43.3
Populist	Jonas J. Morrison	2,484	7.9
Prohibition	William Kelly	771	2.4
Total votes		31,609	100.0
Turnout			
Republican hold			

1894 United States House of Representatives elections in California
Party	Candidate	Votes	%
Republican	Eugene F. Loud (Incumbent)	13,379	36.8
Democratic	Joseph P. Kelly	8,384	23.0
Populist	James T. Rogers	7,820	21.5
Prohibition	James Denman	6,811	18.7
Total votes		36,394	100.0
Turnout			
Democratic hold			

1896 United States House of Representatives elections in California
Party	Candidate	Votes	%
Republican	Eugene F. Loud (Incumbent)	19,351	48.6
Democratic	Joseph P. Kelly	10,494	26.3
Populist	A. B. Kinne	8,825	22.2
Socialist Labor	Henry Daniels	757	1.9
Prohibition	T. H. Lawson	404	1.0
Total votes		39,831	100.0
Turnout			
Republican hold			

1898 United States House of Representatives elections in California
Party	Candidate	Votes	%
Republican	Eugene F. Loud (Incumbent)	20,254	51.8
Democratic	William Craig	17,352	44.3
Socialist Labor	E. T. Kingsley	1,532	3.9
Total votes		39,138	100.0
Turnout			
Republican hold			

1900 United States House of Representatives elections in California
Party	Candidate	Votes	%
Republican	Eugene F. Loud (Incumbent)	23,443	55.7
Democratic	J. H. Henry	17,365	41.3
Socialist	C. H. King	942	2.2
Prohibition	Fred E. Caton	322	0.8
Total votes		42,072	100.0
Turnout			
Republican hold			

1902 United States House of Representatives elections in California
Party	Candidate	Votes	%
Democratic	William J. Wynn	22,712	56.5
Republican	Eugene F. Loud (Incumbent)	16,577	41.2
Socialist	Joseph Lawrence	620	1.5
Prohibition	Fred E. Caton	301	0.8
Total votes		40,210	100.0
Turnout			
Democratic gain from Republican			

U.S. House of Representatives
Preceded by Thomas J. Clunie	Member of the U.S. House of Representatives from California's 5th congressional district 1891–1903	Succeeded by William J. Wynn
