= Duncan E. McKinlay =

American politician

- McKinlay c. 1902

Member of the U.S. House of Representatives from California's 2nd district
- In office March 4, 1905 – March 3, 1911
- Preceded by: Theodore A. Bell
- Succeeded by: William Kent

Personal details
- Born: October 6, 1862 Orillia, Ontario, Canada
- Died: December 30, 1914 (aged 52) Berkeley, California, U.S.
- Party: Republican
- Occupation: Attorney, carriage painter

Duncan E. McKinlay (October 6, 1862 – December 30, 1914) was an American lawyer and politician who served three terms as a U.S. representative from California from 1905 to 1911.

== Biography ==
Born in Orillia, Ontario, Canada, McKinlay attended the common schools. He later learned the trade of carriage painting and worked in Flint, Michigan, and San Francisco, Sacramento, and Santa Rosa, California. After studying law, he was admitted to the bar by the Supreme Court of California in 1892 and commenced practice in Santa Rosa. He served as second assistant United States attorney at San Francisco from 1901–1904, and first assistant United States attorney from 1904–1905.

=== Congress ===
McKinlay in Washington, D.C., December 13, 1910

McKinlay was elected as a Republican to the Fifty-ninth, Sixtieth, and Sixty-first Congresses (March 4, 1905 – March 3, 1911). He was unsuccessful for renomination to Congress in 1910. After McKinlay's defeat, President William Howard Taft appointed him United States surveyor of customs for the port of San Francisco. He died in Berkeley, California on December 30, 1914, and was interred in Sunset View Cemetery in nearby El Cerrito.

=== Positions ===
McKinlay was an avowed supporter of the Geary Act restricting Chinese immigration. At the Chinese Exclusion Convention in 1901, he led the speakers with the "Legal Aspects of the Chinese Question", lauded by the San Francisco Call as a "brilliant address". He concluded the speech calling for a renewal of the Geary Act which would "guard and protect [us] from the blighting curse of Asiatic immigration".

== Electoral history ==
1904 United States House of Representatives elections in California, 2nd district
Party	Candidate	Votes	%
Republican	Duncan E. McKinlay	22,873	49.2
Democratic	Theodore A. Bell (incumbent)	21,640	46.6
Socialist	J. H. White	1,524	3.3
Prohibition	Eli P. LaCell	431	0.9
Total votes		46,468	100.0
Turnout			
Republican gain from Democratic			

1906 United States House of Representatives elections in California, 2nd district
Party	Candidate	Votes	%
Republican	Duncan E. McKinlay (incumbent)	23,411	51.8
Democratic	W. A. Beard	20,262	44.8
Socialist	A. J. Gaylord	1,524	3.4
Total votes		45,197	100.0
Turnout			
Republican hold			

1908 United States House of Representatives elections in California, 2nd district
Party	Candidate	Votes	%
Republican	Duncan E. McKinlay (incumbent)	28,627	57.5
Democratic	W. K. Hays	19,193	38.5
Socialist	A. J. Gaylord	2,003	4.0
Total votes		49,823	100.0
Turnout			
Republican hold			

U.S. House of Representatives
Preceded by Theodore A. Bell	Member of the U.S. House of Representatives from California's 2nd congressional district 1905–1911	Succeeded by William Kent
