= Everis A. Hayes =

American politician

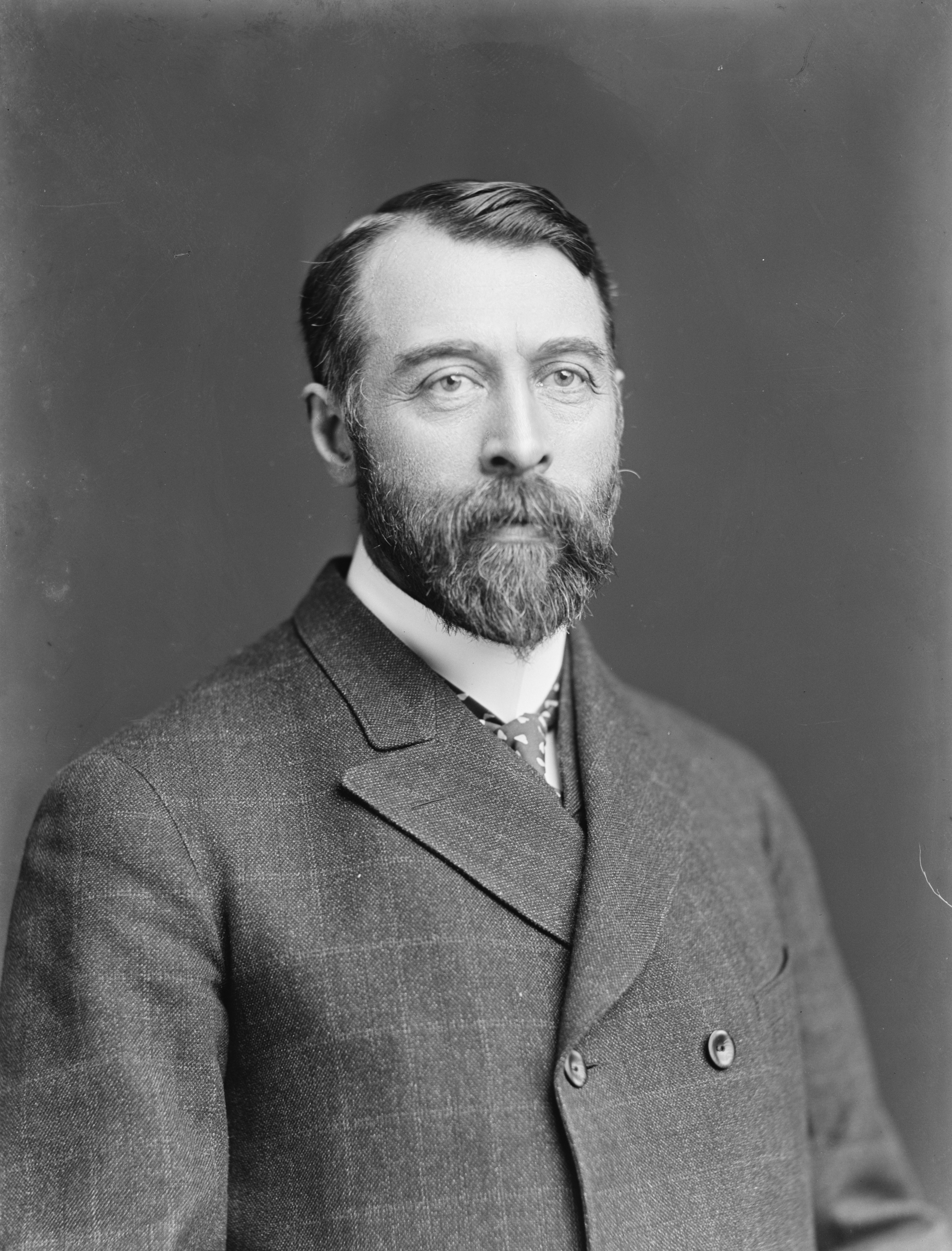
- Portrait by C. M. Bell, 1905

Member of the U.S. House of Representatives from California
- In office March 4, 1905 – March 3, 1919
- Preceded by: William J. Wynn
- Succeeded by: Hugh S. Hersman
- Constituency: 5th district (1905–1913); 8th district (1913–1919)

Personal details
- Born: Everis Anson Hayes; March 10, 1855 Waterloo, Wisconsin
- Died: June 3, 1942 (aged 87) San Jose, California
- Resting place: Oak Hill Memorial Park, San Jose
- Party: Republican

Everis Anson Hayes (March 10, 1855 – June 3, 1942) was an American lawyer and politician who served seven terms as a U.S. representative from California from 1905 to 1919.

== Biography ==
Born in Waterloo, Wisconsin to Anson and Mary Hayes, Hayes attended the public schools. He was graduated from the Waterloo High School in 1873 and from the literary and law departments of the University of Wisconsin–Madison in 1879. He was admitted to the bar in 1879 and commenced practice in Madison, Wisconsin. He moved to Ashland, Wisconsin, in 1883 and in 1886 to Hurley, Wisconsin, and continued the practice of his profession. He moved to Ironwood, Michigan, in 1886 and engaged in the mining of ore. He moved to San Jose, California, in 1887 and engaged in fruit raising and mining. With his brother, Jay Orley Hayes, he purchased the San Jose Mercury in 1900 and the San Jose Herald the following year, becoming publisher and proprietor of the two papers. The Hayes family built the Hayes Mansion in 1903.

=== Congress ===
Hayes (second from left) with other members of the Pujo Committee, 1912

Hayes defeated incumbent Democratic congressman William J. Wynn and was elected as a Republican to the Fifty-ninth and to the six succeeding Congresses (March 4, 1905 – March 3, 1919). He was an outspoken anti-Japanese nativist. On April 5, 1917, he was one of the 50 representatives who voted against declaring war on Germany. He was an unsuccessful candidate for reelection in 1918 to the Sixty-sixth Congress.

=== Later career ===
He resumed his newspaper activities in San Jose, with mining interests in Ironwood, Michigan, and Sierra City, California.

=== Death ===
He died in San Jose, June 3, 1942. He was interred in Oak Hill Memorial Park Cemetery.

== Electoral history ==
1904 United States House of Representatives elections in California
Party	Candidate	Votes	%
Republican	Everis A. Hayes	23,701	52.3
Democratic	William J. Wynn (Incumbent)	18,025	39.7
Socialist	F. R. Whitney	2,263	5.0
Union Labor	Charles J. Williams	916	2.0
Prohibition	George B. Pratt	445	1.0
Total votes		45,350	100.0
Turnout			
Republican gain from Democratic			

1906 United States House of Representatives elections in California
Party	Candidate	Votes	%
Republican	Everis A. Hayes (Incumbent)	22,530	53.4
Democratic	Hiram G. Davis	17,295	41.0
Socialist	Joseph Lawrence	2,343	5.6
Total votes		42,168	100.0
Turnout			
Republican hold			

1908 United States House of Representatives elections in California
Party	Candidate	Votes	%
Republican	Everis A. Hayes (Incumbent)	28,127	49.1
Democratic	George A. Tracy	24,531	42.8
Socialist	E. H. Misner	3,640	6.3
Prohibition	Walter E. Vail	1,045	1.8
Total votes		57,343	100.0
Turnout			
Republican hold			

1910 United States House of Representatives elections in California
Party	Candidate	Votes	%
Republican	Everis A. Hayes (Incumbent)	33,265	59.4
Democratic	Thomas E. Hayden	15,345	27.4
Socialist	E. L. Reguin	7,052	12.6
Prohibition	T. E. Caton	359	0.6
Total votes		56,021	100.0
Turnout			
Republican hold			

United States House of Representatives elections, 1912
Party	Candidate	Votes	%
Republican	Everis A. Hayes (Incumbent)	29,861	50.9%
Democratic	James B. Holohan	20,620	35.2%
Progressive	Robert Whitaker	8,125	13.9%
Total votes		58,606	100.0%
Republican hold			

United States House of Representatives elections, 1914
Party	Candidate	Votes	%
Republican	Everis A. Hayes (Incumbent)	36,499	49.1%
Progressive	Lewis Dan Bohnett	33,706	45.3%
Prohibition	Joseph Merritt Horton	4,157	5.6%
Total votes		74,362	100.0%
Republican hold			

United States House of Representatives elections, 1916
Party	Candidate	Votes	%
Republican	Everis A. Hayes (Incumbent)	50,659	68.6%
Progressive	George S. Walker	17,576	23.8%
Socialist	Cora Pattleton Wilson	5,564	7.5%
Total votes		73,799	100.0%
Republican hold			

United States House of Representatives elections, 1918
Party	Candidate	Votes	%
Democratic	Hugh S. Hersman	31,167	53%
Republican	Everis A. Hayes (Incumbent)	27,641	47%
Total votes		58,808	100%
Democratic gain from Republican			

U.S. House of Representatives
Preceded by William J. Wynn	Member of the U.S. House of Representatives from California's 5th congressional district 1905–1913	Succeeded by John I. Nolan
Preceded by Sylvester C. Smith	Member of the U.S. House of Representatives from California's 8th congressional district 1913–1919	Succeeded by Hugh S. Hersman
