= Thomas J. Clunie =

American politician

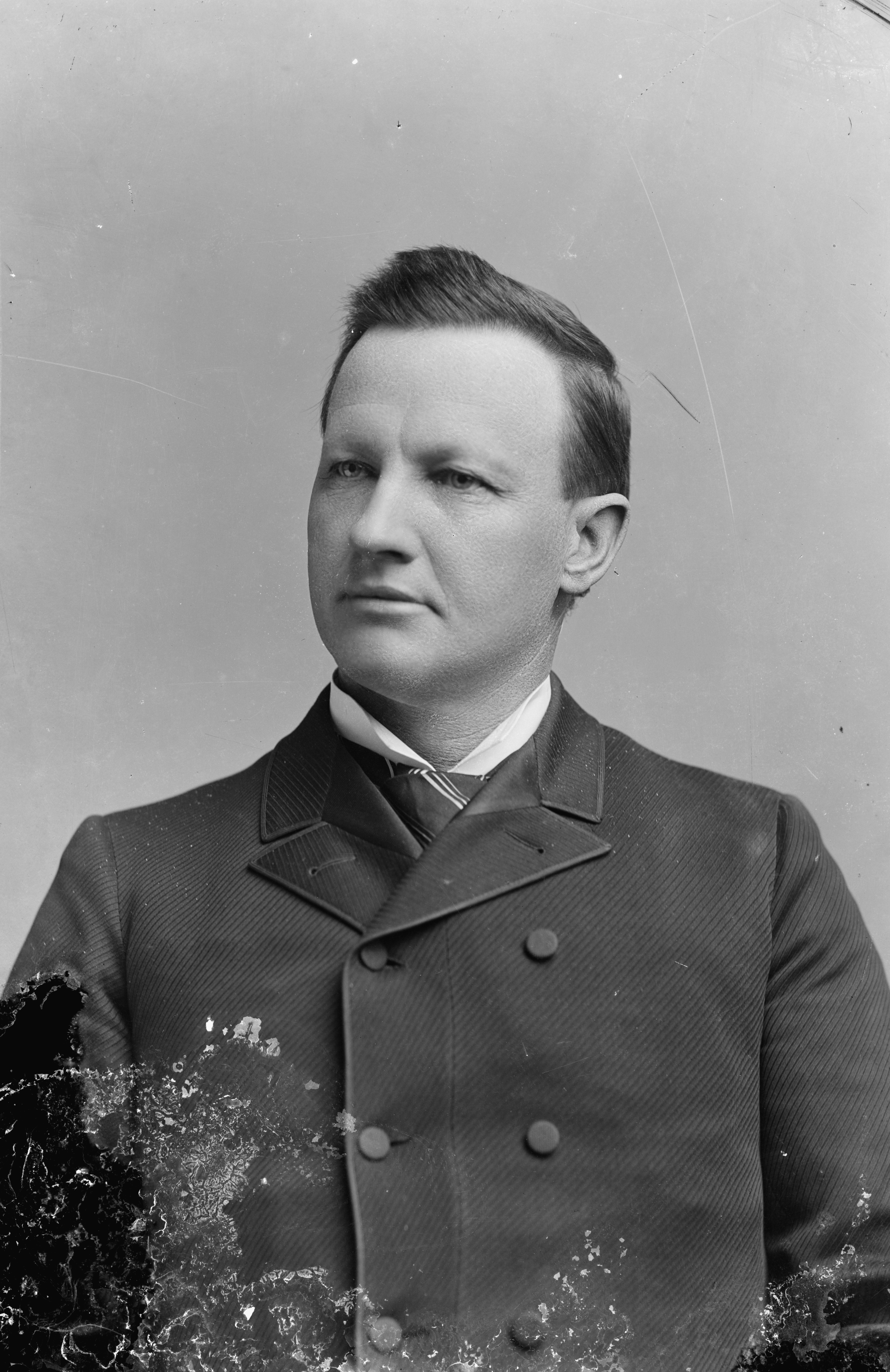
- Portrait by C. M. Bell c. 1889–1890

Member of the U.S. House of Representatives from California's 5th district
- In office March 4, 1889 – March 3, 1891
- Preceded by: Charles N. Felton
- Succeeded by: Eugene F. Loud

Member of the California Senate from the 27th district
- In office January 3, 1887 – January 7, 1889
- Preceded by: Belden Goodwin Hurlburt
- Succeeded by: John E. Hamill

Member of the California State Assembly from the 18th district
- In office December 6, 1875 – December 3, 1877
- Preceded by: Multi-member district
- Succeeded by: Multi-member district

Personal details
- Born: Thomas Jefferson Clunie; March 25, 1852 St. John's, Newfoundland, Canada
- Died: June 30, 1903 (aged 51) San Francisco, California, U.S.
- Resting place: Sacramento Historic City Cemetery
- Party: Democratic
- Occupation: Lawyer, politician

Military service
- Allegiance: United States
- Branch/service: California National Guard
- Rank: Brigadier General
- Commands: 4th Brigade

Thomas Jefferson Clunie (March 25, 1852 – June 30, 1903) was an American lawyer and politician who served one term as a U.S. representative from California from 1889 to 1891.

== Early life ==
Clunie was born in St. John's, Newfoundland on March 25, 1852, while his parents were on a visit there from Massachusetts. He moved with his parents to California in 1854, then to Maine, and then back to California in 1861. He attended public schools in Sacramento, and upon graduation studied law under the tutelage of a Harvard College graduate. He was admitted to the bar in 1868, before the age of majority, under a special act of the legislature. He began his law practice in Sacramento in 1870.

== Political career ==
Clunie served as a member of the California State Assembly from 1875 to 1877, one of three members from a district based in Sacramento County. At just 23 years old, he was the second-youngest member of the Legislature, behind James G. Maguire (who was also later elected to Congress). Clunie served as delegate to the Democratic National Convention in 1884. He served in the State Senate from 1887 to 1889. He served in the state militia, commanding the 4th Brigade, National Guard of California, before he retired as brigadier general.

=== Congress ===
Clunie was elected as a Democrat to the Fifty-first Congress. He served from March 4, 1889 to March 3, 1891. He was unsuccessful running for reelection in 1890 to the Fifty-second Congress. He resumed the practice of his profession.

== Death ==
Clunie died in San Francisco, California, on June 30, 1903. He was interred in the Sacramento Historic City Cemetery.

== Electoral history ==
1888 United States House of Representatives elections in California
Party	Candidate	Votes	%
Democratic	Thomas J. Clunie	20,276	49.3
Republican	Timothy Guy Phelps	20,225	49.2
Independent	Henry French	613	1.5
Total votes		41,114	100.0
Turnout			
Democratic gain from Republican			

1890 United States House of Representatives elections in California
Party	Candidate	Votes	%
Republican	Eugene F. Loud	22,871	52.8
Democratic	Thomas J. Clunie (Incumbent)	19,899	45.9
Socialist	E. F. Howe	574	1.3
Total votes		43,344	100.0
Turnout			
Republican gain from Democratic			

U.S. House of Representatives
Preceded by Charles N. Felton	Member of the U.S. House of Representatives from California's 5th congressional district 1889–1891	Succeeded by Eugene F. Loud
