= California's 5th congressional district =

U.S. House district for California

- Interactive map of district boundaries
- Representative: Tom McClintock; R–Elk Grove
- Population (2025): 788,764
- Median household income: $99,811
- Ethnicity: 59.2% White; 25.6% Hispanic; 6.0% Asian; 5.3% Two or more races; 2.2% Black; 1.8% other
- Cook PVI: R+8

California's 5th congressional district is a U.S. congressional district in California.

The district is located in the northern San Joaquin Valley and central Sierra Nevada. The district includes Gold Country and small parts of the Central Valley, including all of Amador, Calaveras, Tuolumne and Mariposa counties, western El Dorado County, and eastern Stanislaus, Madera and Fresno counties. Cities and communities in the district include most of Modesto, northern Turlock, northern Fresno, Oakdale, Hughson, Riverbank, Sonora, Jackson, Placerville, Mariposa, and El Dorado Hills. It also includes Yosemite National Park and part of Kings Canyon National Park. It is represented by Republican Tom McClintock.

From 2013 to 2023, the district was located in the northern part of the San Francisco Bay Area, including Santa Rosa, Vallejo, and most of the Wine Country. The district was represented by Mike Thompson, a Democrat.

== Recent election results from statewide races ==
=== 2023–2027 boundaries ===
Year	Office	Results
2008	President	McCain 56% - 44%
2010	Governor	Whitman 57% - 38%
2010	Lt. Governor	Maldonado 57% - 33%
2010	Secretary of State	Dunn 54% - 38%
2010	Attorney General	Cooley 60% - 30%
2010	Treasurer	Walters 51% - 42%
2010	Controller	Chiang 46.5% - 45.9%
2012	President	Romney 58% - 42%
2014	Governor	Kashkari 56% - 44%
2016	President	Trump 55% - 39%
2018	Governor	Cox 59% - 41%
2018	Attorney General	Bailey 58% - 42%
2020	President	Trump 55% - 43%
2022	Senate (Reg.)	Meuser 60% - 40%
2022	Governor	Dahle 63% - 37%
2022	Lt. Governor	Underwood Jacobs 61% - 39%
2022	Secretary of State	Bernosky 61% - 39%
2022	Attorney General	Hochman 61% - 39%
2022	Treasurer	Guerrero 61% - 39%
2022	Controller	Chen 64% - 36%
2024	President	Trump 58% - 40%
2024	Senate (Reg.)	Garvey 60% - 40%

== Composition ==
FIPS County Code	County	Seat	Population
5	Amador	Jackson	41,811
9	Calaveras	San Andreas	46,565
17	El Dorado	Placerville	192,215
19	Fresno	Fresno	1,017,162
39	Madera	Madera	162,858
43	Mariposa	Mariposa	16,919
99	Stanislaus	Modesto	551,430
109	Tuolumne	Sonora	54,204

=== Cities and CDPs with 10,000 or more people ===
- Fresno – 542,107
- Modesto – 218,464
- Turlock – 72,740
- El Dorado Hills – 50,547
- Riverbank – 24,865
- Oakdale – 23,181
- Cameron Park – 19,171
- Salida – 13,886
- Diamond Springs – 11,345
- Placerville – 10,747

=== 2,500 – 10,000 people ===
- Waterford – 9,120
- Hughson – 7,481
- Oakhurst – 5,945
- Rancho Calaveras – 5,590
- Ione – 5,141
- Yosemite Lakes – 5,022
- Jackson – 5,019
- Sonora – 5,003
- Denair – 4,865
- Shingle Springs – 4,660
- Phoenix Lake – 4,264
- Coarsegold – 4,144
- Valley Springs – 3,779
- Angels – 3,667
- Jamestown – 3,478
- Copperopolis – 3,400
- Arnold – 3,288
- North Fork – 3,250
- Auberry – 3,238
- Mono Vista – 3,236
- East Oakdale – 3,201
- San Andreas – 2,994
- Pine Grove – 2,891
- Sutter Creek – 2,646
- Pine Mountain Lake – 2,636
- Buckhorn – 2,597
- Columbia – 2,577

== Future composition ==
Beginning with the 2026 election, the 5th district will consist of the following counties:

- Alpine
- Amador
- Calaveras
- El Dorado (part)
- Fresno (part)
- Inyo
- Madera (part)
- Mariposa
- Mono
- San Joaquin (part)
- Stanislaus (part)
- Tuolumne

== List of members representing the district ==
Member	Party	Years	Cong ress(es)	Electoral history	Counties
District created March 4, 1885
Charles N. Felton (San Francisco)	Republican	March 4, 1885 – March 3, 1889	49th 50th	Elected in 1884. Re-elected in 1886. Retired.	1885–1893; San Francisco, San Mateo, Santa Clara, Santa Cruz
Thomas J. Clunie (San Francisco)	Democratic	March 4, 1889 – March 3, 1891	51st	Elected in 1888. Retired.	1885–1893; San Francisco, San Mateo, Santa Clara, Santa Cruz
Eugene F. Loud (San Francisco)	Republican	March 4, 1891 – March 3, 1903	52nd 53rd 54th 55th 56th 57th	Elected in 1890. Re-elected in 1892. Re-elected in 1894. Re-elected in 1896. Re-elected in 1898. Re-elected in 1900. Lost re-election.	1885–1893; San Francisco, San Mateo, Santa Clara, Santa Cruz
Eugene F. Loud (San Francisco)	Republican	March 4, 1891 – March 3, 1903	52nd 53rd 54th 55th 56th 57th	Elected in 1890. Re-elected in 1892. Re-elected in 1894. Re-elected in 1896. Re-elected in 1898. Re-elected in 1900. Lost re-election.	1893–1913; San Francisco, San Mateo, Santa Clara
William J. Wynn (San Francisco)	Democratic/ Union Labor	March 4, 1903 – March 3, 1905	58th	Elected in 1902. Lost re-election.	1893–1913; San Francisco, San Mateo, Santa Clara
Everis A. Hayes (San Jose)	Republican	March 4, 1905 – March 3, 1913	59th 60th 61st 62nd	Elected in 1904. Re-elected in 1906. Re-elected in 1908. Re-elected in 1910. Redistricted to the 8th district.	1893–1913; San Francisco, San Mateo, Santa Clara
John I. Nolan (San Francisco)	Republican	March 4, 1913 – November 18, 1922	63rd 64th 65th 66th 67th	Elected in 1912. Re-elected in 1914. Re-elected in 1916. Re-elected in 1918. Re-elected in 1920. Re-elected in 1922. Died.	1913–1967; San Francisco
Vacant		November 18, 1922 – January 23, 1923	67th		1913–1967; San Francisco
Mae Nolan (San Francisco)	Republican	January 23, 1923 – March 3, 1925	67th 68th	Elected to finish her husband's expiring term, and to the new term to which he had been elected. Retired.	1913–1967; San Francisco
Lawrence J. Flaherty (San Francisco)	Republican	March 4, 1925 – June 13, 1926	69th	Elected in 1924. Died.	1913–1967; San Francisco
Vacant		June 13, 1926 – August 31, 1926	69th		1913–1967; San Francisco
Richard J. Welch (San Francisco)	Republican	August 31, 1926 – September 10, 1949	69th 70th 71st 72nd 73rd 74th 75th 76th 77th 78th 79th 80th 81st	Elected to finish Flaherty's term. Re-elected in 1926; Re-elected in 1928. Re-elected in 1930. Re-elected in 1932. Re-elected in 1934. Re-elected in 1936. Re-elected in 1938. Re-elected in 1940. Re-elected in 1942. Re-elected in 1944. Re-elected in 1946. Re-elected in 1948. Died.	1913–1967; San Francisco
Vacant		September 10, 1949 – November 8, 1949	81st		1913–1967; San Francisco
John F. Shelley (San Francisco)	Democratic	November 8, 1949 – January 7, 1964	81st 82nd 83rd 84th 85th 86th 87th 88th	Elected to finish Welch's term. Re-elected in 1950. Re-elected in 1952. Re-elected in 1954. Re-elected in 1956. Re-elected in 1958. Re-elected in 1960. Re-elected in 1962. Resigned after election as Mayor of San Francisco.	1913–1967; San Francisco
Vacant		January 7, 1964 – February 18, 1964	88th		1913–1967; San Francisco
Phillip Burton (San Francisco)	Democratic	February 18, 1964 – January 3, 1975	88th 89th 90th 91st 92nd 93rd	Elected to finish Shelley's term. Re-elected later in 1964. Re-elected in 1966. Re-elected in 1968. Re-elected in 1970. Re-elected in 1972. Redistricted to the 6th district.	1913–1967; San Francisco
Phillip Burton (San Francisco)	Democratic	February 18, 1964 – January 3, 1975	88th 89th 90th 91st 92nd 93rd	Elected to finish Shelley's term. Re-elected later in 1964. Re-elected in 1966. Re-elected in 1968. Re-elected in 1970. Re-elected in 1972. Redistricted to the 6th district.	Eastern San Francisco
John Burton (San Francisco)	Democratic	January 3, 1975 – January 3, 1983	94th 95th 96th 97th	Redistricted from the 6th district and re-elected in 1974. Re-elected in 1976. Re-elected in 1978. Re-elected in 1980. Retired.	1975–1983; Marin, northwestern San Francisco
Phillip Burton (San Francisco)	Democratic	January 3, 1983 – April 10, 1983	98th	Redistricted from the 6th district and re-elected in 1982. Died.	1983–1993; Western San Francisco
Vacant		April 10, 1983 – June 21, 1983	98th		1983–1993; Western San Francisco
Sala Burton (San Francisco)	Democratic	June 21, 1983 – February 1, 1987	98th 99th 100th	Elected to finish her husband's term. Re-elected in 1984. Re-elected in 1986. Died.	1983–1993; Western San Francisco
Vacant		February 1, 1987 – June 2, 1987	100th		1983–1993; Western San Francisco
Nancy Pelosi (San Francisco)	Democratic	June 2, 1987 – January 3, 1993	100th 101st 102nd	Elected to finish Burton's term. Re-elected in 1988. Re-elected in 1990. Redistricted to the 8th district.	1983–1993; Western San Francisco
Bob Matsui (Sacramento)	Democratic	January 3, 1993 – January 1, 2005	103rd 104th 105th 106th 107th 108th	Redistricted from the 3rd district and re-elected in 1992. Re-elected in 1994. Re-elected in 1996. Re-elected in 1998. Re-elected in 2000. Re-elected in 2002. Re-elected in 2004, but died before his term began.	1993–2003; Sacramento (Sacramento city)
Bob Matsui (Sacramento)	Democratic	January 3, 1993 – January 1, 2005	103rd 104th 105th 106th 107th 108th	Redistricted from the 3rd district and re-elected in 1992. Re-elected in 1994. Re-elected in 1996. Re-elected in 1998. Re-elected in 2000. Re-elected in 2002. Re-elected in 2004, but died before his term began.	2003–2013 Sacramento (Sacramento city)
Vacant		January 1, 2005 – March 8, 2005	108th 109th		2003–2013 Sacramento (Sacramento city)
Doris Matsui (Sacramento)	Democratic	March 8, 2005 – January 3, 2013	109th 110th 111th 112th	Elected to finish her husband's term. Re-elected in 2006. Re-elected in 2008. Re-elected in 2010. Redistricted to the 6th district.	2003–2013 Sacramento (Sacramento city)
Mike Thompson (St. Helena)	Democratic	January 3, 2013 – January 3, 2023	113th 114th 115th 116th 117th	Redistricted from the 1st district and re-elected in 2012. Re-elected in 2014. Re-elected in 2016. Re-elected in 2018. Re-elected in 2020. Redistricted to the 4th district.	2013–2023 North Bay area including Napa, Santa Rosa, and Vallejo
Tom McClintock (Elk Grove)	Republican	January 3, 2023 – present	118th 119th	Redistricted from the 4th district and re-elected in 2022. Re-elected in 2024. Re-elected in 2026.	2023–present Amador, Calaveras, Tuolumne. Mariposa, western El Dorado, eastern Stanislaus, Madera and Fresno.

== Complete election results ==
=== 1884 ===
1884 United States House of Representatives elections in California
Party	Candidate	Votes	%
Republican	Charles N. Felton	17,014	51.7
Democratic	Frank J. Sullivan	15,676	47.6
Prohibition	William Crowhurst	232	0.7
Total votes		32,922	100.0
Turnout			
Republican gain from Democratic			

=== 1886 ===
1886 United States House of Representatives elections in California
Party	Candidate	Votes	%
Republican	Charles N. Felton (Incumbent)	16,328	48.8
Democratic	Frank J. Sullivan	16,209	48.4
Independent	Albert E. Redstone	470	1.4
Prohibition	C. Henderson	460	1.4
Total votes		33,467	100.0
Turnout			
Republican hold			

=== 1888 ===
1888 United States House of Representatives elections in California
Party	Candidate	Votes	%
Democratic	Thomas J. Clunie	20,276	49.3
Republican	Timothy Guy Phelps	20,225	49.2
Independent	Henry French	613	1.5
Total votes		41,114	100.0
Turnout			
Democratic gain from Republican			

=== 1890 ===
1890 United States House of Representatives elections in California
Party	Candidate	Votes	%
Republican	Eugene F. Loud	22,871	52.8
Democratic	Thomas J. Clunie (Incumbent)	19,899	45.9
Socialist	E. F. Howe	574	1.3
Total votes		43,344	100.0
Turnout			
Republican gain from Democratic			

=== 1892 ===
1892 United States House of Representatives elections in California
Party	Candidate	Votes	%
Republican	Eugene F. Loud (Incumbent)	14,660	46.4
Democratic	J. W. Ryland	13,694	43.3
Populist	Jonas J. Morrison	2,484	7.9
Prohibition	William Kelly	771	2.4
Total votes		31,609	100.0
Turnout			
Republican hold			

=== 1894 ===
1894 United States House of Representatives elections in California
Party	Candidate	Votes	%
Republican	Eugene F. Loud (Incumbent)	13,379	36.8
Democratic	Joseph P. Kelly	8,384	23.0
Populist	James T. Rogers	7,820	21.5
Prohibition	James Denman	6,811	18.7
Total votes		36,394	100.0
Turnout			
Republican hold			

=== 1896 ===
1896 United States House of Representatives elections in California
Party	Candidate	Votes	%
Republican	Eugene F. Loud (Incumbent)	19,351	48.6
Democratic	Joseph P. Kelly	10,494	26.3
Populist	A. B. Kinne	8,825	22.2
Socialist Labor	Henry Daniels	757	1.9
Prohibition	T. H. Lawson	404	1.0
Total votes		39,831	100.0
Turnout			
Republican hold			

=== 1898 ===
1898 United States House of Representatives elections in California
Party	Candidate	Votes	%
Republican	Eugene F. Loud (Incumbent)	20,254	51.8
Democratic	William Craig	17,352	44.3
Socialist Labor	E. T. Kingsley	1,532	3.9
Total votes		39,138	100.0
Turnout			
Republican hold			

=== 1900 ===
1900 United States House of Representatives elections in California
Party	Candidate	Votes	%
Republican	Eugene F. Loud (Incumbent)	23,443	55.7
Democratic	J. H. Henry	17,365	41.3
Socialist	C. H. King	942	2.2
Prohibition	Fred E. Caton	322	0.8
Total votes		42,072	100.0
Turnout			
Republican hold			

=== 1902 ===
1902 United States House of Representatives elections in California
Party	Candidate	Votes	%
Democratic	William J. Wynn	22,712	56.5
Republican	Eugene F. Loud (Incumbent)	16,577	41.2
Socialist	Joseph Lawrence	620	1.5
Prohibition	Fred E. Caton	301	0.8
Total votes		40,210	100.0
Turnout			
Democratic gain from Republican			

=== 1904 ===
1904 United States House of Representatives elections in California
Party	Candidate	Votes	%
Republican	Everis A. Hayes	23,701	52.3
Democratic	William J. Wynn (Incumbent)	18,025	39.7
Union Labor	F. R. Whitney	2,263	5.0
Socialist	Charles J. Williams	916	2.0
Prohibition	George B. Pratt	445	1.0
Total votes		45,350	100.0
Turnout			
Republican gain from Democratic			

=== 1906 ===
1906 United States House of Representatives elections in California
Party	Candidate	Votes	%
Republican	Everis A. Hayes (Incumbent)	22,530	53.4
Democratic	Hiram G. Davis	17,295	41.0
Socialist	Joseph Lawrence	2,343	5.6
Total votes		42,168	100.0
Turnout			
Republican hold			

=== 1908 ===
1908 United States House of Representatives elections in California
Party	Candidate	Votes	%
Republican	Everis A. Hayes (Incumbent)	28,127	49.1
Democratic	George A. Tracy	24,531	42.8
Socialist	E. H. Misner	3,640	6.3
Prohibition	Walter E. Vail	1,045	1.8
Total votes		57,343	100.0
Turnout			
Republican hold			

=== 1910 ===
1910 United States House of Representatives elections in California
Party	Candidate	Votes	%
Republican	Everis A. Hayes (Incumbent)	33,265	59.4
Democratic	Thomas E. Hayden	15,345	27.4
Socialist	E. L. Reguin	7,052	12.6
Prohibition	T. E. Caton	359	0.6
Total votes		56,021	100.0
Turnout			
Republican hold			

=== 1912 ===
1912 United States House of Representatives elections in California
Party	Candidate	Votes	%
Republican	John I. Nolan	27,902	52.3
Socialist	Stephen V. Costello	18,516	34.7
Prohibition	E. L. Requin	6,962	13.0
Total votes		53,380	100.0
Turnout			
Republican win (new seat)			

=== 1914 ===
1914 United States House of Representatives elections in California
Party	Candidate	Votes	%
Republican	John I. Nolan (Incumbent)	53,875	83.3
Socialist	Mads Peter Christensen	7,366	11.4
Prohibition	Frederick Head	3,410	5.3
Total votes		64,651	100.0
Turnout			
Republican hold			

=== 1916 ===
1916 United States House of Representatives elections in California
Party	Candidate	Votes	%
Republican	John I. Nolan (Incumbent)	59,333	84.7
Socialist	Charles A. Preston	6,708	9.6
Prohibition	Frederick Head	4,046	5.8
Total votes		70,087	100.0
Turnout			
Republican hold			

=== 1918 ===
1918 United States House of Representatives elections in California
Party	Candidate	Votes	%
Republican	John I. Nolan (Incumbent)	40,375	87
Socialist	Thomas F. Feeley	6,032	13
Total votes		46,407	100.0
Turnout			
Republican hold			

=== 1920 ===
1920 United States House of Representatives elections in California
Party	Candidate	Votes	%
Republican	John I. Nolan (Incumbent)	50,274	81.8
Socialist	Hugo Ernst	10,952	18.2
Total votes		61,226	100.0
Turnout			
Republican hold			

=== 1922 ===
1922 United States House of Representatives elections in California
Party	Candidate	Votes	%
Republican	John I. Nolan (Incumbent)	49,414	100.0
Turnout			
Republican hold			

=== 1923 (Special) ===
Republican Mae Nolan won the special election to replace her husband John I. Nolan, who won re-election but died before the 68th Congress convened. Data for this special election is not available.

=== 1924 ===
1924 United States House of Representatives elections in California
Party	Candidate	Votes	%
Republican	Lawrence J. Flaherty	38,893	72.6
Socialist	Isabel C. King	12,175	27.4
Total votes		51,068	100.0
Turnout			
Republican hold			

=== 1926 (Special) ===
Republican Richard J. Welch won the special election to replace fellow Republican Lawrence J. Flaherty, who died in office. Data for this special election is not available.

=== 1926 ===
1926 United States House of Representatives elections in California
Party	Candidate	Votes	%
Republican	Richard J. Welch (Incumbent)	47,694	100.0
Turnout			
Republican hold			

=== 1928 ===
1928 United States House of Representatives elections in California
Party	Candidate	Votes	%
Republican	Richard J. Welch (Incumbent)	51,708	100.0
Turnout			
Republican hold			

=== 1930 ===
1930 United States House of Representatives elections in California
Party	Candidate	Votes	%
Republican	Richard J. Welch (Incumbent)	59,853	100.0
Turnout			
Republican hold			

=== 1932 ===
1932 United States House of Representatives elections in California
Party	Candidate	Votes	%
Republican	Richard J. Welch (Incumbent)	67,349	100.0
Turnout			
Republican hold			

=== 1934 ===
1934 United States House of Representatives elections in California
Party	Candidate	Votes	%
Republican	Richard J. Welch (Incumbent)	89,751	93.8
Communist	Alexander Noral	5,933	6.2
Total votes		95,684	100.0
Turnout			
Republican hold			

=== 1936 ===
1936 United States House of Representatives elections in California
Party	Candidate	Votes	%
Republican	Richard J. Welch (Incumbent)	82,910	94.8
Communist	Lawrence Ross	4,545	5.2
Total votes		87,455	100.0
Turnout			
Republican hold			

=== 1938 ===
1938 United States House of Representatives elections in California
Party	Candidate	Votes	%
Republican	Richard J. Welch (Incumbent)	91,868	100.0
Turnout			
Republican hold			

=== 1940 ===
1940 United States House of Representatives elections in California
Party	Candidate	Votes	%
Republican	Richard J. Welch (Incumbent)	119,122	95.8
Communist	Walter R. Lambert	5,232	4.2
Total votes		124,354	100.0
Turnout			
Republican hold			

=== 1942 ===
1942 United States House of Representatives elections in California
Party	Candidate	Votes	%
Republican	Richard J. Welch (Incumbent)	85,747	92.7
Communist	Walter R. Lambert	6,749	7.3
Total votes		92,496	100.0
Turnout			
Republican hold			

=== 1944 ===
1944 United States House of Representatives elections in California
Party	Candidate	Votes	%
Republican	Richard J. Welch (Incumbent)	112,151	100.0
Turnout			
Republican hold			

=== 1946 ===
1946 United States House of Representatives elections in California
Party	Candidate	Votes	%
Republican	Richard J. Welch (Incumbent)	94,293	100.0
Turnout			
Republican hold			

=== 1948 ===
1948 United States House of Representatives elections in California
Party	Candidate	Votes	%
Republican	Richard J. Welch (Incumbent)	116,347	100.0
Turnout			
Republican hold			

=== 1949 (Special) ===
Democrat John F. Shelley won the special election to replace Republican Richard J. Welch, who died in office. Data for this special election is not available.

=== 1950 ===
1950 United States House of Representatives elections in California
Party	Candidate	Votes	%
Democratic	John F. Shelley (Incumbent)	117,888	100.0
Turnout			
Democratic hold			

=== 1952 ===
1952 United States House of Representatives elections in California
Party	Candidate	Votes	%
Democratic	John F. Shelley (Incumbent)	107,542	100.0
Turnout			
Democratic hold			

=== 1954 ===
1954 United States House of Representatives elections in California
Party	Candidate	Votes	%
Democratic	John F. Shelley (Incumbent)	86,428	100.0
Turnout			
Democratic hold			

=== 1956 ===
1956 United States House of Representatives elections in California
Party	Candidate	Votes	%
Democratic	John F. Shelley (Incumbent)	104,358	100.0
Turnout			
Democratic hold			

=== 1958 ===
1958 United States House of Representatives elections in California
Party	Candidate	Votes	%
Democratic	John F. Shelley (Incumbent)	99,171	100.0
Turnout			
Democratic hold			

=== 1960 ===
1960 United States House of Representatives elections in California
Party	Candidate	Votes	%
Democratic	John F. Shelley (Incumbent)	104,507	83.7
Republican	Nick Verreos	20,305	16.3
Total votes		124,812	100.0
Turnout			
Democratic hold			

=== 1962 ===
1962 United States House of Representatives elections in California
Party	Candidate	Votes	%
Democratic	John F. Shelley (Incumbent)	64,493	80.4
Republican	Roland S. Charles	15,670	19.6
Total votes		80,163	100.0
Turnout			
Democratic hold			

=== 1964 ===
1964 United States House of Representatives elections in California
Party	Candidate	Votes	%
Democratic	Phillip Burton (Incumbent)	71,638	100.0
Turnout			
Democratic hold			

=== 1966 ===
1966 United States House of Representatives elections in California
Party	Candidate	Votes	%
Democratic	Phillip Burton (Incumbent)	56,476	71.3
Republican	Terry R. Macken	22,778	28.7
Total votes		79,254	100.0
Turnout			
Democratic hold			

=== 1968 ===
1968 United States House of Representatives elections in California
Party	Candidate	Votes	%
Democratic	Phillip Burton (Incumbent)	86,647	72.0
Republican	Waldo Velasquez	29,123	24.2
Peace and Freedom	Marvin Garson	4,549	3.8
Total votes		120,319	100.0
Turnout			
Democratic hold			

=== 1970 ===
1970 United States House of Representatives elections in California
Party	Candidate	Votes	%
Democratic	Phillip Burton (Incumbent)	76,567	70.8
Republican	John E. Parks	31,570	29.2
Total votes		108,137	100.0
Turnout			
Democratic hold			

=== 1972 ===
1972 United States House of Representatives elections in California
Party	Candidate	Votes	%
Democratic	Phillip Burton (Incumbent)	120,819	81.8
Republican	Edlo E. Powell	26,963	18.2
Total votes		147,782	100.0
Turnout			
Democratic hold			

=== 1974 ===
1974 United States House of Representatives elections in California
Party	Candidate	Votes	%
Democratic	John Burton (Incumbent)	87,323	59.6
Republican	Thomas Caylor	55,881	37.7
Peace and Freedom	Raymond Broshears	3,999	2.7
Total votes		147,203	100.0
Turnout			
Democratic hold			

=== 1976 ===
1976 United States House of Representatives elections in California
Party	Candidate	Votes	%
Democratic	John Burton (Incumbent)	103,746	61.8
Republican	Branwell Fanning	64,008	38.2
Total votes		167,754	100.0
Turnout			
Democratic hold			

=== 1978 ===
1978 United States House of Representatives elections in California
Party	Candidate	Votes	%
Democratic	John Burton (Incumbent)	106,046	66.8
Republican	Dolores Skore	52,603	33.2
Total votes		158,649	100.0
Turnout			
Democratic hold			

=== 1980 ===
1980 United States House of Representatives elections in California
Party	Candidate	Votes	%
Democratic	John Burton (Incumbent)	101,105	51.1
Republican	Dennis McQuaid	89,624	45.3
Libertarian	Dan P. Dougherty	7,092	3.6
Total votes		197,821	100.0
Turnout			
Democratic hold			

=== 1982 ===
1982 United States House of Representatives elections in California
Party	Candidate	Votes	%
Democratic	Phillip Burton (Incumbent)	103,268	50.5
Republican	Milton Marks	72,139	35.3
Libertarian	Justin Raimondo	2,904	14.2
Total votes		178,311	100.0
Turnout			
Democratic hold			

=== 1983 (Special) ===
1983 Special election
Party	Candidate	Votes	%
Democratic	Sala Burton		56.9
Republican	Duncan Lent Howard		23.3
Democratic	Richard Doyle		8.4
Republican	Tom Spinosa		3.7
Republican	Gary Richard Arnold		2.0
Democratic	Tibor Uskert		1.4
Republican	Bill Dunlap		1.3
Democratic	Evelyn K. Lantz		1.1
Democratic	Michael O. Plunkett		0.7
Peace and Freedom	Andrew R. "Paul" Kangas		0.6
Libertarian	Eric A. Garris		0.5
No party	Richard Stypman (Write-in)		
No party	Samuel Unger (write-in)		
Total votes			100.0
Turnout			
Democratic hold			

=== 1984 ===
1984 United States House of Representatives elections in California
Party	Candidate	Votes	%
Democratic	Sala Burton (Incumbent)	139,692	72.3
Republican	Tom Spinosa	45,930	23.8
Libertarian	Joseph Fuhrig	4,008	2.1
Peace and Freedom	Henry Clark	3,574	1.8
Total votes		193,204	100.0
Turnout			
Democratic hold			

=== 1986 ===
1986 United States House of Representatives elections in California
Party	Candidate	Votes	%
Democratic	Sala Burton (Incumbent)	122,688	75.2
Republican	Mike Garza	36,039	22.1
Libertarian	Samuel K. "Sam" Grove	2,409	1.5
Peace and Freedom	Theodore Adrian "Ted" Zuur	2,078	1.3
Total votes		163,214	100.0
Turnout			
Democratic hold			

=== 1987 (Special) ===
1987 Special election
Party	Candidate	Votes	%
Democratic	Nancy Pelosi		63.4
Republican	Harriet Ross		23.3
Independent	Karen Edwards		2.2
Independent	Cathy Sedwick		0.9
Peace and Freedom	Theodore Adrian "Ted" Zurr		1.5
Libertarian	Samuel K. "Sam" Grove		1.4
Total votes			100.0
Turnout			
Democratic hold			

=== 1988 ===
1988 United States House of Representatives elections in California
Party	Candidate	Votes	%
Democratic	Nancy Pelosi (Incumbent)	133,530	76.4
Republican	Bruce Michael O'Neill	33,692	19.3
Peace and Freedom	Theodore Adrian "Ted" Zuur	3,975	2.3
Libertarian	Sam Grove	3,561	2.0
Total votes		174,758	100.0
Turnout			
Democratic hold			

=== 1990 ===
1990 United States House of Representatives elections in California
Party	Candidate	Votes	%
Democratic	Nancy Pelosi (Incumbent)	120,633	77.2
Republican	Alan Nichols	35,671	22.8
Total votes		156,304	100.0
Turnout			
Democratic hold			

=== 1992 ===
1992 United States House of Representatives elections in California
Party	Candidate	Votes	%
Democratic	Robert Matsui (Incumbent)	158,250	68.6
Republican	Robert S. Dinsmore	58,698	25.5
American Independent	Gordon Mors	4,745	2.1
Libertarian	Chris J. Rufer	4,547	2.0
Green	Tian Harter	4,316	1.9
No party	Bergeron (write-in)	4	0.0
Total votes		230,560	100.0
Turnout			
Democratic hold			

=== 1994 ===
1994 United States House of Representatives elections in California
Party	Candidate	Votes	%
Democratic	Robert Matsui (Incumbent)	125,042	68.48
Republican	Robert S. Dinsmore	52,905	28.97
American Independent	Gordon Mors	4,649	2.55
Total votes		182,596	100.0
Turnout			
Democratic hold			

=== 1996 ===
1996 United States House of Representatives elections in California
Party	Candidate	Votes	%
Democratic	Robert Matsui (Incumbent)	142,618	70.5
Republican	Robert Dinsmore	52,940	26.2
Libertarian	Joseph Miller	2,548	1.2
American Independent	Gordon Mors	2,231	1.1
Natural Law	Charles Kersey	2,123	1.0
Total votes		202,460	100.0
Turnout			
Democratic hold			

=== 1998 ===
1998 United States House of Representatives elections in California
Party	Candidate	Votes	%
Democratic	Robert Matsui (Incumbent)	130,715	71.89
Republican	Robert Dinsmore	47,307	26.02
Libertarian	Douglas Arthur Tuma	3,746	2.06
Green	Ken Adams (write-in)	70	0.04
Total votes		181,838	100.0
Turnout			
Democratic hold			

=== 2000 ===
2000 United States House of Representatives elections in California
Party	Candidate	Votes	%
Democratic	Robert Matsui (Incumbent)	147,025	68.1
Republican	Ken Payne	55,945	25.9
Green	Ken Adams	6,195	2.9
Libertarian	Cullene Lang	3,746	1.7
Natural Law	Alan Barreca	2,894	1.3
Total votes		215,805	100.0
Turnout			
Democratic hold			

=== 2002 ===
2002 United States House of Representatives elections in California
Party	Candidate	Votes	%
Democratic	Robert Matsui (Incumbent)	90,697	70.9
Republican	Richard Frankhuizen	33,313	26.1
Libertarian	Timothy E. Roloff	3,923	3.0
Total votes		189,717	100.0
Turnout			
Democratic hold			

=== 2004 ===
2004 United States House of Representatives elections in California
Party	Candidate	Votes	%
Democratic	Robert Matsui (Incumbent)	138,004	71.4
Republican	Mike Dugas	45,120	23.4
Green	Pat Driscoll	6,593	3.4
Peace and Freedom	John C. Reiger	3,670	1.8
Total votes		193,387	100.0
Turnout			
Democratic hold			

=== 2005 (special) ===
Incumbent Robert Matsui died January 1, 2005. In a special election held on March 8, 2005, to fill the vacancy, Matsui's widow, Doris, won the seat with almost 68% of the vote. She was sworn in on March 10, 2005.

2005 special election
Party	Candidate	Votes	%
Democratic	Doris Matsui	56,175	67.65
Democratic	Julie Padilla	7,158	8.62
Republican	John Flynn	6,559	7.90
Republican	Serge Chernay	3,742	4.51
Republican	Michael O'Brien	2,591	3.12
Republican	Shane Singh	1,753	2.11
Republican	Bruce Stevens	1,124	1.35
Green	Pat Driscoll	976	1.18
Independent	Leonard Padilla	916	1.10
Democratic	Charles Pineda	659	0.79
Libertarian	Gale Morgan	451	0.54
Peace and Freedom	John Reiger	286	0.34
Democratic	Lara Shapiro (write-in)	6	0.01
Invalid or blank votes		637	0.77
Total votes		83,033	100.0
Turnout			27.72
Democratic hold			

=== 2006 ===
2006 United States House of Representatives elections in California
Party	Candidate	Votes	%
Democratic	Doris Matsui (Incumbent)	89,119	70.7
Republican	Xiaochin Claire Yan	29,824	23.7
Green	Jeff Kravitz	5,394	4.3
Peace and Freedom	John C. Reiger	1,716	1.3
Total votes		126,053	100.0
Turnout			
Democratic hold			

=== 2008 ===
2008 United States House of Representatives elections in California
Party	Candidate	Votes	%
Democratic	Doris Matsui (Incumbent)	164,242	74.3
Republican	Paul A. Smith	46,002	20.9
Peace and Freedom	L. R. Roberts	10,731	4.8
Independent	David B.Lynch (write-in candidate)	180	0.0
Total votes		221,155	100
Turnout			
Democratic hold			

=== 2010 ===
2010 United States House of Representatives elections in California
Party	Candidate	Votes	%
Democratic	Doris Matsui (Incumbent)	124,220	72%
Republican	Paul A. Smith	43,577	25%
Peace and Freedom	Gerald Allen Frink	4,594	3%
Total votes		172,391	100%
Turnout			
Democratic hold			

=== 2012 ===
United States House of Representatives elections, 2012
Party	Candidate	Votes	%
Democratic	Mike Thompson (Incumbent)	202,872	74.5%
Republican	Randy Loftin	69,545	25.5%
Total votes		272,417	100.0%
Democratic hold			

=== 2014 ===
United States House of Representatives elections, 2014
Party	Candidate	Votes	%
Democratic	Mike Thompson (Incumbent)	129,613	75.7%
No party preference	James Hinton	41,535	24.3%
Total votes		171,148	100.0%
Democratic hold			

=== 2016 ===
United States House of Representatives elections, 2016
Party	Candidate	Votes	%
Democratic	Mike Thompson (Incumbent)	224,526	76.9%
Republican	Carlos Santamaria	67,565	23.1%
Total votes		292,091	100.0%
Democratic hold			

=== 2018 ===
2018 United States House of Representatives in California
Party	Candidate	Votes	%
Democratic	Mike Thompson (Incumbent)	205,860	78.9%
No party preference	Anthony Mills	55,158	21.1%
Total votes		261,018	100.0%
Democratic hold			

=== 2020 ===
2020 United States House of Representatives elections in California
Party	Candidate	Votes	%
Democratic	Mike Thompson (incumbent)	271,233	76.1
Republican	Scott Giblin	85,227	23.9
Total votes		356,460	100.0
Democratic hold			

=== 2022 ===
2022 United States House of Representatives election in California
Party	Candidate	Votes	%
Republican	Tom McClintock (incumbent)	173,524	61.3
Democratic	Michael J. Barkley	109,506	38.7
Total votes		283,030	100.0
Republican hold			

=== 2024 ===
2024 United States House of Representatives election in California
Party	Candidate	Votes	%
Republican	Tom McClintock (incumbent)	227,643	61.8
Democratic	Michael J. Barkley	140,919	38.2
Total votes		368,562	100.0
Republican hold			

== Timeline of representatives ==
The following timeline depicts the progression of the representatives and their political affiliation at the time of assuming office.

== See also ==
- List of United States congressional districts
- California's congressional districts
