= William J. Wynn =

American politician

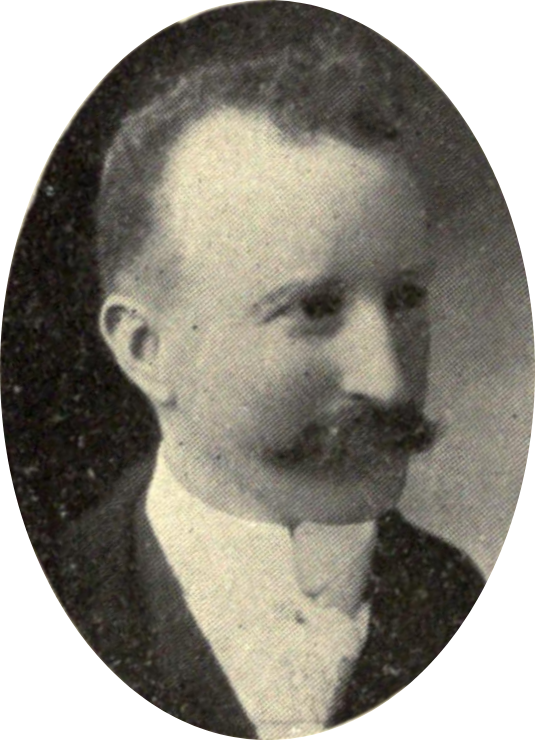
- Wynn c. 1901

Member of the U.S. House of Representatives from California's 5th district
- In office March 4, 1903 – March 3, 1905
- Preceded by: Eugene F. Loud
- Succeeded by: Everis A. Hayes

Member of the San Francisco Board of Supervisors
- In office January 8, 1902 – March 4, 1903
- Preceded by: Joseph S. Tobin
- Succeeded by: Edward I. Walsh

Personal details
- Born: William Joseph Wynn; June 12, 1860 San Francisco, California, U.S.
- Died: January 4, 1935 (aged 74) San Francisco, California, U.S.
- Resting place: Holy Cross Cemetery
- Party: Democratic; Union Labor
- Spouse: Nellie Donovan (m. 1894)
- Children: Harold; William Jr.; John
- Occupation: Machinist

William Joseph Wynn (June 12, 1860 – January 4, 1935) was an American machinist and politician who served as a U.S. representative from California for one term from 1903 to 1905.

== Biography ==
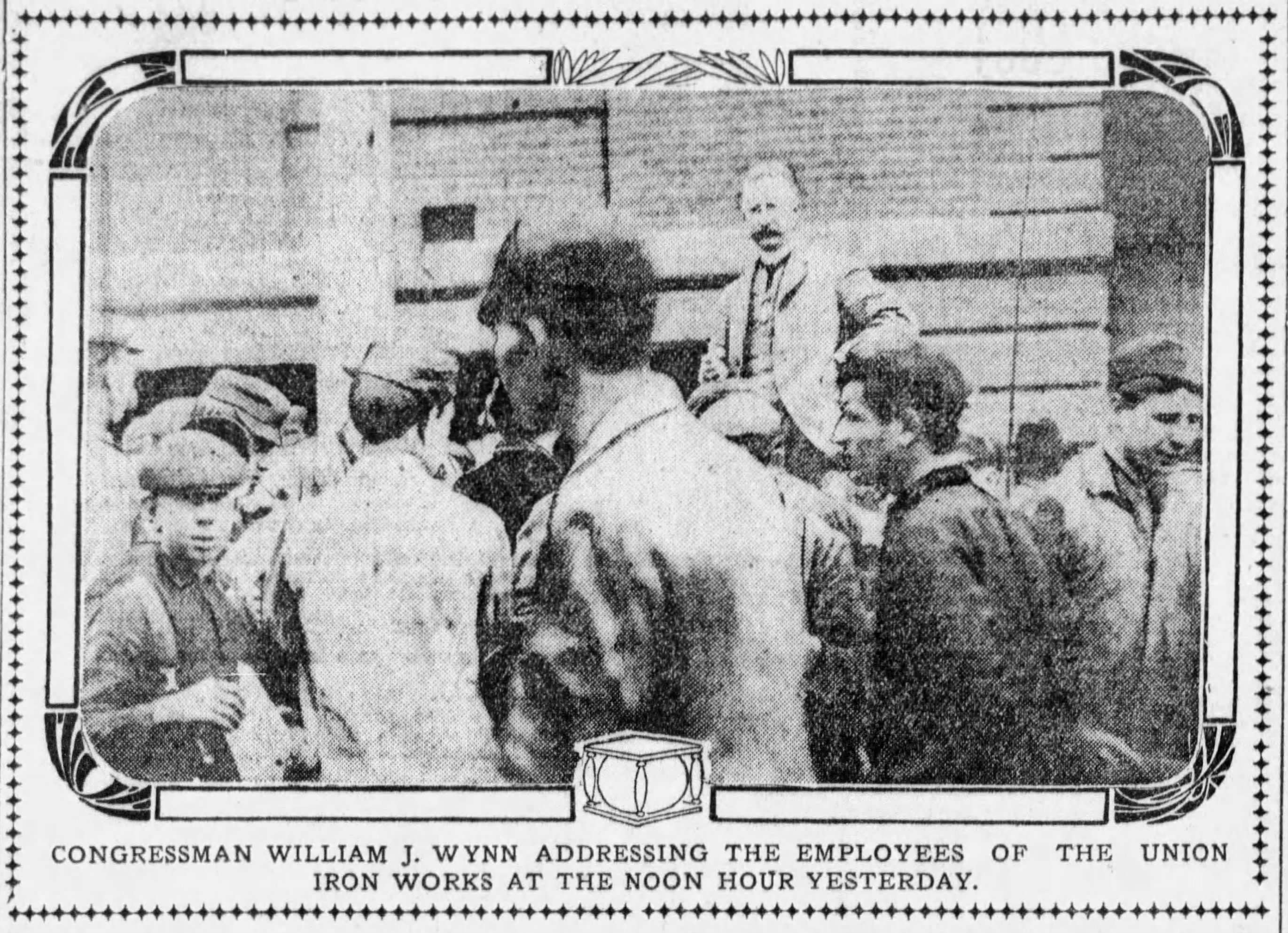
Wynn addresses a meeting of Union Iron Works employees, October 7, 1904

Born to Irish parents in San Francisco, California, Wynn attended the city's public schools. He apprenticed as a machinist and then worked the trade in the city's principal manufacturing establishments. An ally of Republican political operative Abe Ruef, Wynn was chosen to be one of his representatives to the founding convention of the Union Labor Party in 1901, serving as secretary of the convention. He was then elected to the San Francisco Board of Supervisors that November on the Union Labor ticket, serving from January 1902 to March 1903.

=== Congress ===
Wynn was elected on a Democratic and Union Labor ticket to the 58th Congress, serving from 1903 to 1905. During his tenure he turned on Ruef, now political boss of the Union Labor Party, and subsequently lost the party's nomination in 1904. Though he still had the Democratic ballot line, he lost to Republican Everis A. Hayes.

=== Later career and death ===
After leaving office, Wynn worked in the insurance business in San Francisco until his death on January 4, 1935. He is interred at Holy Cross Cemetery in Colma, California.

Wynn was an active member of the Native Sons of the Golden West.

== Electoral history ==
1902 United States House of Representatives elections in California
Party	Candidate	Votes	%
Democratic	William J. Wynn	22,712	56.5
Republican	Eugene F. Loud (Incumbent)	16,577	41.2
Socialist	Joseph Lawrence	620	1.5
Prohibition	Fred E. Caton	301	0.8
Total votes		40,210	100.0
Turnout			
Democratic gain from Republican			

1904 United States House of Representatives elections in California
Party	Candidate	Votes	%
Republican	Everis A. Hayes	23,701	52.3
Democratic	William J. Wynn (Incumbent)	18,025	39.7
Socialist	F. R. Whitney	2,263	5.0
Union Labor	Charles J. Williams	916	2.0
Prohibition	George B. Pratt	445	1.0
Total votes		45,350	100.0
Turnout			
Republican gain from Democratic			

== Sources ==
- United States Congress. "William J. Wynn (id: W000785)". Biographical Directory of the United States Congress.
- Bean, Walton (1952). Boss Ruef's San Francisco: The Story of the Union Labor Party, Big Business, and the Graft Prosecution. Berkeley: University of California Press.

U.S. House of Representatives
Preceded by Eugene F. Loud	Member of the U.S. House of Representatives from California's 5th congressional district 1903–1905	Succeeded by Everis A. Hayes
