= Sylvester C. Smith =

American politician

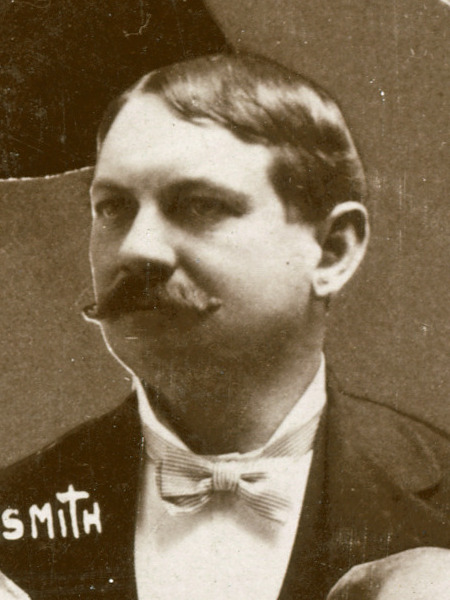
- Smith c. 1899

Member of the U.S. House of Representatives from California's 8th district
- In office March 4, 1905 – January 26, 1913
- Preceded by: Milton J. Daniels
- Succeeded by: Everis A. Hayes

Member of the California Senate from the 34th district
- In office January 7, 1895 – January 5, 1903
- Preceded by: George G. Goucher
- Succeeded by: William H. Savage

Personal details
- Born: Sylvester Clark Smith; August 26, 1858 Mount Pleasant, Iowa, U.S.
- Died: January 26, 1913 (aged 54) Los Angeles, California, U.S.
- Resting place: Union Cemetery, Bakersfield, California, U.S.
- Party: Republican
- Spouse: Maria Hart (m. 1885)
- Children: 2
- Education: Howe's Academy, Mount Pleasant, Iowa, U.S.
- Profession: Attorney; Newspaper editor

Sylvester Clark Smith (August 26, 1858 – January 26, 1913) was an American lawyer and politician. A Republican, he served four terms as a U.S. representative from California from 1905 to 1913.

== Biography ==
Smith was born near Mount Pleasant, Iowa on August 26, 1858, a son of Edward Smith and Celia (Shockley) Smith. He attended the district schools and Howe's Academy in Mount Pleasant, then taught school in Winfield, Iowa. He moved to California in 1879, where he farmed in addition teaching school in Colusa and Kern Counties.

=== Legal career ===
In 1882, Smith and one of his brothers traveled to Walla Walla, Washington. Upon returning to California in 1883, he began to study law in San Francisco. He continued his studies in Bakersfield in 1884, was admitted to the bar in 1885 and commenced practice in Bakersfield. In addition to his legal career, Smith was editor of the Kern County Echo newspaper.

=== California assembly ===
A Republican, Smith served in the California State Senate from 1895 to 1903. Among his legislative achievements was the bill establishing California Polytechnic State University, San Luis Obispo, enacted in 1901. In 1902, he was an unsuccessful candidate for nomination for the United States House of Representatives, losing the primary to Milton J. Daniels.

=== Congress ===
In 1904, Daniels decided not to run again, and Smith won election to the U.S. House. He was re-elected three times, serving in the 59th and the three succeeding Congresses (March 4, 1905 until his death). By the spring of 1912, Smith was seriously ill with heart trouble, and he declined to seek another term in Congress.

=== Death and burial ===
Smith died in Los Angeles, California, on January 26, 1913. He was interred at Union Cemetery in Bakersfield.

== Family ==
On May 7, 1885, Smith married Maria Hart. They were the parents of two daughters, Eva and Dorrit.

== Electoral history ==
United States House of Representatives elections, 1904
Party	Candidate	Votes	%
Republican	Sylvester C. Smith	23,683	55.6%
Democratic	William T. Lucas	12,861	34.5%
Socialist	Noble A. Richardson	4,636	9.9%
Prohibition	Benjamin J. Cloes	1,430	3.4%
Total votes		42,610	100.0%
Republican hold			

United States House of Representatives elections, 1906
Party	Candidate	Votes	%
Republican	Sylvester C. Smith (Incumbent)	22,548	55.6%
Democratic	Charles A. Barlow	13,992	34.5%
Socialist	Noble A. Richardson	4,003	9.9%
Total votes		40,543	100.0%
Republican hold			

United States House of Representatives elections, 1908
Party	Candidate	Votes	%
Republican	Sylvester C. Smith (Incumbent)	28,202	50.5%
Democratic	William G. Irving	18,958	33.9%
Socialist	George A. Garrett	7,302	13.1%
Prohibition	James S. Edwards	1,379	2.5%
Total votes		45,831	100.0%
Republican hold			

United States House of Representatives elections, 1910
Party	Candidate	Votes	%
Republican	Sylvester C. Smith (Incumbent)	28,202	50.5%
Democratic	William G. Irving	18,958	33.9%
Socialist	George A. Garrett	7,302	13.1%
Prohibition	James S. Edwards	1,379	2.5%
Total votes		45,831	100.0%
Republican hold			

== See also ==
- List of members of the United States Congress who died in office (1900–1949)

U.S. House of Representatives
Preceded by Milton J. Daniels	Member of the U.S. House of Representatives from California's 8th congressional district 1905–1913	Succeeded by Everis A. Hayes
