= Political party strength in U.S. states =

Map of relative party strengths in each U.S. state after the 2024 presidential election

Political party strength in U.S. states is the level of representation of the various political parties in the United States in each statewide elective office providing legislators to the state and to the U.S. Congress and electing the executives at the state (U.S. state governor) and national (U.S. President) level.

== History ==
Throughout most of the 20th century, although the Republican and Democratic parties alternated in power at a national level, some states were so overwhelmingly dominated by one party that nomination was usually tantamount to election. This was especially true in the Solid South, where the Democratic Party was dominant for the better part of a century, from the end of Reconstruction in the late 1870s, through the period of Jim Crow Laws into the 1960s. Conversely, the rock-ribbed New England states of Vermont, Maine, and New Hampshire were dominated by the Republican Party, as were some Midwestern states like Iowa and North Dakota.

However, in the 1970s and 1980s the increasingly conservative Republican Party gradually overtook the Democrats in the southeast. The Democrats' support in the formerly Solid South had been eroded during the vast cultural, political, and economic upheaval that surrounded the 1960s. By the 1990s, the Republican Party had completed the transition into the southeast's dominant political party, despite typically having fewer members due to the prevalence of Republican voting generational Democrats. In New England, the opposite trend occurred; the former Republican strongholds of Maine and Vermont became solidly Democratic, as did formerly Republican areas of New Jersey, New York, California, Oregon, and Connecticut.

In the U.S. state legislative elections of 2010, the Republican Party held an outright majority of 3,890 seats (53% of total) compared to the Democratic party's 3,450 (47% of total) seats elected on a partisan ballot. Of the 7,382 seats in all of the state legislatures combined, independents and third parties account for only 16 members, not counting the 49 members of the Nebraska Legislature, which is the only legislature in the nation to hold non-partisan elections to determine its members. As a result of the 2010 elections, Republicans took control of an additional 20 state legislative chambers, giving them majority control of both chambers in 25 states versus the Democrats' majority control of both chambers in only 17 states, with 7 states having split or inconclusive control of both chambers (not including Nebraska). Before the 2010 elections, it was Democrats who controlled both chambers in 27 states versus the Republican party having total control in only 14 states, with 8 states divided, and Nebraska being nonpartisan.

Since this election, Republicans have maintained a majority of state legislative chambers and seats, as well as governorships nationwide. As of 2024, there are 23 Republican trifectas, 17 Democratic trifectas, and 10 divided governments with both parties holding either legislative chambers or the governorship. Additionally, the distribution of the national population living under single-party rule has shifted; approximately 41.5% of the United States population resides in a state with a Republican trifecta, 39.1% lives under a Democratic trifecta, and 19.4% lives under a divided state government.

== Current party strength ==
=== Cook Partisan Voting Index (PVI) ===
Another metric measuring party preference is the Cook Partisan Voting Index (PVI). Cook PVIs are calculated by comparing a state's average Democratic Party or Republican Party share of the two-party presidential vote in the past two presidential elections to the nation's average share of the same. PVIs for the states over time can be used to show the trends of U.S. states towards, or away from, one party or the other.

=== Gallup ===
On Gallup's historical trend tracking through 2025, an average of 27% of Americans identified as Democrats, 27% identified as Republicans, and 45% as Independent. Additionally, when prompted on their political leanings regardless of party affiliation, 47% of Americans identified as Democrats or leaning Democratic, while 42% identified as Republicans or leaning Republican.

In 2023, the number of competitive states according to opinion polling dropped down to 10, the lowest number since 2008. From 2023 to 2024, Wisconsin, Nevada, and Pennsylvania moved from competitive to lean Republican, while Virginia, New Mexico, and Colorado moved from competitive to lean Democratic, and Nebraska moved from lean Republican to competitive.

As of 2018, Massachusetts was the most Democratic state, with 56% of residents identifying as Democrats, while only 27% of residents identified as Republicans. Washington D.C. (while not a state) has 3 electoral votes and 76% of residents identify as Democrats, while 6% identify as Republicans. Wyoming was the most Republican state, with 59% of residents identifying as Republicans, and only 25% of residents identifying as Democrats.

Partisan lean of U.S. adults according to Gallup polling
Year	Party Identification (%)			Leaned Party Identification (%)	
Year	Republican	Independent	Democratic	Rep / Lean Rep	Dem / Lean Dem
1991	33	36	31	48	44
1992	29	37	34	42	49
1993	29	38	34	41	48
1994	30	38	32	44	46
1995	30	39	31	44	46
1996	30	36	34	42	49
1997	29	37	34	40	49
1998	29	37	34	41	49
1999	28	38	34	41	48
2000	30	35	34	42	47
2001	32	35	33	44	45
2002	33	34	32	45	45
2003	32	36	31	45	45
2004	34	31	34	45	48
2005	33	33	33	43	48
2006	30	34	34	40	50
2007	28	39	33	40	51
2008	28	35	36	40	52
2009	27	37	34	41	49
2010	29	38	31	44	45
2011	27	40	31	45	45
2012	28	40	31	42	47
2013	25	42	31	41	47
2014	26	43	30	42	45
2015	26	42	29	42	45
2016	28	39	31	42	47
2017	27	42	29	42	47
2018	26	42	30	41	47
2019	28	41	30	42	47
2020	29	39	30	43	48
2021	27	42	29	43	46
2022	28	41	28	45	44
2023	27	43	27	45	43
2024	28	43	28	46	45
2025	27	45	27	42	47

=== Voter registration ===
The state Democratic or Republican Party controls the governorship, the state legislative houses, and U.S. Senate representation. Nebraska's legislature is unicameral (i.e., it has only one legislative house) and is officially non-partisan, though party affiliation still has an unofficial influence on the legislative process.

The simplest measure of party strength in a state voting population is the affiliation totals from voter registration from the websites of the Secretaries of State or state Boards of Elections for the 31 jurisdictions (30 states and the District of Columbia) that allow registered voters to indicate a party preference when registering to vote. 20 states (Note: Alabama, Arkansas, Georgia, Hawaii, Illinois, Indiana, Michigan, Minnesota, Mississippi, Missouri, Montana, North Dakota, Ohio, South Carolina, Tennessee, Texas, Vermont, Virginia, Washington, and Wisconsin.) do not include party preference with voter registration. The party affiliations in the party control table are obtained from state party registration figures where indicated.

As of 2026, voters in California, Delaware, Maine, Nevada, New Jersey, New Mexico, New York, and Pennsylvania are plurality-Democratic, while the majority of voters in Maryland and the District of Columbia are Democrats. Meanwhile, voters in Arizona, Florida, Louisiana, Iowa, Kansas, Kentucky, Nebraska, and West Virginia are plurality-Republican, and the majority of voters in Idaho, Oklahoma, South Dakota, Utah, and Wyoming are Republicans. In Alaska, Colorado, Connecticut, New Hampshire, North Carolina, Oregon, and Rhode Island, independent/unaffiliated voters outnumber both of the main parties. In Massachusetts, the majority of voters are independent. Ongoing trends through 2026 indicate that the total share of voters registered in either of the two major parties has dropped below 65% for the first time in over 90 years, with Democratic registration hitting an all-time low but the Republican registration is increasing.

Voter Registration Totals (June 2025)
Party name	Total registrants	% of Registrants
Democratic	44,900,000	36.84%
Republican	38,000,000	31.01%
Independent / Unaffiliated	33,700,000	27.70%
Other parties (combined)	5,400,000	4.46%
Total tracked registrants	122,000,000	100.00%

== Party strength by state ==
Local and regional political circumstances often influence party strength.

=== U.S. state party control as of November 2026 ===
State	2024 presidential election	Governor	State Senate	State House	Senior U.S. Senator	Junior U.S. Senator	U.S. House of Representatives
Alabama	Republican	Republican	Republican 27–8	Republican 76–29	Republican	Republican	Republican 5–2
Alaska	Republican	Republican	Coalition 14–6 (Note: A coalition of 14 Democrats, 2 Republicans, and 5 Independents make up the majority caucus in the Alaska House of Representatives, while a grand coalition of 9 Democrats and 5 Republicans make up the majority caucus in the Alaska Senate.)	Coalition 21–19	Republican	Republican	Republican 1–0
Arizona	Republican	Democratic	Republican 17–13	Republican 33–27	Democratic	Democratic	Republican 6–3
Arkansas	Republican	Republican	Republican 29–6	Republican 81–19	Republican	Republican	Republican 4–0
California	Democratic	Democratic	Democratic 30–10	Democratic 60–20	Democratic	Democratic	Democratic 43–9
Colorado	Democratic	Democratic	Democratic 23–12	Democratic 43–22	Democratic	Democratic	Tied 4–4
Connecticut	Democratic	Democratic	Democratic 25–11	Democratic 102–49	Democratic	Democratic	Democratic 5–0
Delaware	Democratic	Democratic	Democratic 15–6	Democratic 27–14	Democratic	Democratic	Democratic 1–0
Florida	Republican	Republican	Republican 28–11–1	Republican 87–33	Republican	Republican	Republican 20–8
Georgia	Republican	Republican	Republican 33–23	Republican 100–80	Democratic	Democratic	Republican 9–5
Hawaii	Democratic	Democratic	Democratic 22–3	Democratic 42–9	Democratic	Democratic	Democratic 2–0
Idaho	Republican	Republican	Republican 29–6	Republican 61–9	Republican	Republican	Republican 2–0
Illinois	Democratic	Democratic	Democratic 40–19	Democratic 78–40	Democratic	Democratic	Democratic 14–3
Indiana	Republican	Republican	Republican 40–10	Republican 69–30-1	Republican	Republican	Republican 7–2
Iowa	Republican	Republican	Republican 33–17	Republican 67–33	Republican	Republican	Republican 4–0
Kansas	Republican	Democratic	Republican 31–9	Republican 88–37	Republican	Republican	Republican 3–1
Kentucky	Republican	Democratic	Republican 32–6	Republican 80–20	Republican	Republican	Republican 5–1
Louisiana	Republican	Republican	Republican 27–12	Republican 71–33–1	Republican	Republican	Republican 4–2
Maine	Democratic/Republican (2nd District)	Democratic	Democratic 20–15	Democratic 76-73-2	Republican	Independent (Note: Senators Bernie Sanders (I-VT) and Angus King (I-ME) are Independent Democrats and, as such, are included in Democrats' total number of Senators for the purposes of calculating partisan breakdown in this article.)	Democratic 2–0
Maryland	Democratic	Democratic	Democratic 34–13	Democratic 102–39	Democratic	Democratic	Democratic 7–1
Massachusetts	Democratic	Democratic	Democratic 35–5	Democratic 134–25–1	Democratic	Democratic	Democratic 9–0
Michigan	Republican	Democratic	Democratic 20–18	Republican 58–52	Democratic	Democratic	Republican 7–6
Minnesota	Democratic (DFL)	Democratic (DFL)	Democratic (DFL) 34–33	Tied 67-67	Democratic (DFL)	Democratic (DFL)	Tied 4–4
Mississippi	Republican	Republican	Republican 34–18	Republican 79–41–2	Republican	Republican	Republican 3–1
Missouri	Republican	Republican	Republican 24–10	Republican 111–52	Republican	Republican	Republican 6–2
Montana	Republican	Republican	Republican 32–18	Republican 58–42	Republican	Republican	Republican 2–0
Nebraska	Republican/Democratic (2nd District)	Republican	Unicameral Nonpartisan Legislature (Note: While the Nebraska Legislature is technically non-partisan, the majority of its senators are de facto Republicans.) (De facto Republican 33–15-1)		Republican	Republican	Republican 3–0
Nevada	Republican	Republican	Democratic 13–8	Democratic 27–15	Democratic	Democratic	Democratic 3–1
New Hampshire	Democratic	Republican	Republican 16–8	Republican 222–178	Democratic	Democratic	Democratic 2–0
New Jersey	Democratic	Democratic	Democratic 25–15	Democratic 57–23	Democratic	Democratic	Democratic 9–3
New Mexico	Democratic	Democratic	Democratic 26–16	Democratic 44–26	Democratic	Democratic	Democratic 3–0
New York	Democratic	Democratic	Democratic 41–22	Democratic 103–47	Democratic	Democratic	Democratic 19–7
North Carolina	Republican	Democratic	Republican 30–20	Republican 71–49	Republican	Republican	Republican 10–4
North Dakota	Republican	Republican	Republican 42–5	Republican 83–11	Republican	Republican	Republican 1–0
Ohio	Republican	Republican	Republican 24–9	Republican 65–34	Republican	Republican	Republican 10–5
Oklahoma	Republican	Republican	Republican 40–8	Republican 81–20	Republican	Republican	Republican 5–0
Oregon	Democratic	Democratic	Democratic 18–12	Democratic 36–24	Democratic	Democratic	Democratic 5–1
Pennsylvania	Republican	Democratic	Republican 27–23	Democratic 102–101	Democratic	Republican	Republican 10–7
Rhode Island	Democratic	Democratic	Democratic 34–4	Democratic 64–10-1	Democratic	Democratic	Democratic 2–0
South Carolina	Republican	Republican	Republican 34–12	Republican 88–36	Republican	Republican	Republican 6–1
South Dakota	Republican	Republican	Republican 32–3	Republican 64–6	Republican	Republican	Republican 1–0
Tennessee	Republican	Republican	Republican 27–6	Republican 75–24	Republican	Republican	Republican 8–1
Texas	Republican	Republican	Republican 20–11	Republican 88–62	Republican	Republican	Republican 25–13
Utah	Republican	Republican	Republican 22–6–1	Republican 61–14	Republican	Republican	Republican 4–0
Vermont	Democratic	Republican	Democratic 16–13–1	Democratic 87–56–4–3	Independent	Democratic	Democratic 1–0
Virginia	Democratic	Democratic	Democratic 21–19	Democratic 64–36	Democratic	Democratic	Democratic 6–5
Washington	Democratic	Democratic	Democratic 30–19	Democratic 59–39	Democratic	Democratic	Democratic 8–2
West Virginia	Republican	Republican	Republican 32–2	Republican 91–9	Republican	Republican	Republican 2–0
Wisconsin	Republican	Democratic	Republican 18–15	Republican 54-45	Republican	Democratic	Republican 6–2
Wyoming	Republican	Republican	Republican 28–2	Republican 56–6	Republican	Republican	Republican 1–0

Totals
Presidency (2024 Election)	U.S. Senate	U.S. House of Representatives	Governorships	Majority in State Senate	Majority in State House
Republican 312–226	Republican 53–47	Republican 220–215	Republican 26–24	Republican 29–20–1	Republican 28–19–2

=== State government ===
Governor	Governors and Legislatures
US state governors by political party as of 22 November 2026 Democratic Republican Independent New Progressive (Republican affiliated) Non-partisan (Republican affiliated)	US state and territorial governments (governor and legislature) by party control as of 22 November 2026 Democratic control Republican control New Progressive control Split control

== Historical party strength ==
The number of state legislatures controlled by each party.

Year	Democrats	Republicans	Split
1938	21	19	6
1940	21	17	8
1942	19	24	3
1944	19	24	3
1946	17	25	4
1948	19	16	11
1950	19	21	6
1952	16	26	4
1954	19	20	7
1956	22	19	5
1958	30	7	11
1960	27	15	6
1962	25	17	6
1964	32	6	10
1966	23	16	9
1968	20	20	8
1970	23	16	9
1972	26	16	7
1974	37	4	8
1976	35	4	10
1978	31	11	7
1980	29	15	5
1982	34	11	4
1984	26	11	12
1986	28	9	12
1988	29	8	12
1990	30	6	13
1992	25	8	16
1994	18	19	12
1996	20	18	11
1998	20	17	12
2000	16	18	15
2002	18	17	14
2003	16	21	12
2004	17	21	11
2005	20	20	9
2007	24	16	9
2008	23	15	12
2009	27	15	8
2010	27	15	8
2011	15	27	8
2012	15	29	6
2013	17	28	5
2014	17	28	5
2015	11	31	8
2016	11	31	8
2017	12	32	6
2018	13	32	5
2019	18	30	2
2020	19	29	2
2021	18	30	2
2022	17	30	3
2023	19	28	3
2024	20	28	2
2025	18	28	4
2026	18	28	4

The state governorships controlled by each party.

Year	Democrats	Republicans	Independent
1922	26	22	0
1923	27	21	0
1924	23	25	0
1926	20	28	0
1927	19	29	0
1928	16	32	0
1930	24	22	2
1931	26	20	2
1932	36	10	2
1934	37	9	2
1936	38	7	3
1937	39	6	3
1938	29	19	0
1940	28	20	0
1942	24	24	0
1943	22	26	0
1944	25	23	0
1946	23	25	0
1947	24	24	0
1948	28	20	0
1950	22	26	0
1952	18	30	0
1953	19	29	0
1954	27	21	0
1956	28	20	0
1958	35	15	0
1960	34	16	0
1962	34	16	0
1964	33	17	0
1966	25	25	0
1967	24	26	0
1968	19	31	0
1969	18	32	0
1970	29	21	0
1971	30	20	0
1972	31	19	0
1973	32	18	0
1974	36	13	1
1976	37	12	1
1978	32	18	0
1979	31	19	0
1980	27	23	0
1982	34	16	0
1983	35	15	0
1984	34	16	0
1986	26	24	0
1988	28	22	0
1989	29	21	0
1990	28	20	2
1992	30	18	2
1993	29	19	2
1994	19	30	1
1995	18	31	1
1996	17	32	1
1998	17	31	2
1999	18	30	2
2000	19	29	2
2001	21	27	2
2002	24	26	0
2004	22	28	0
2006	28	22	0
2008	29	21	0
2009	26	24	0
2010	26	23	1
2011	20	29	1
2012	20	29	1
2013	20	30	0
2014	21	29	0
2015	18	31	1
2016	18	31	1
2017	15	34	1
2018	16	33	1
2019	23	27	0
2020	24	26	0
2021	23	27	0
2022	22	28	0
2023	24	26	0
2024	23	27	0
2025	23	27	0
2026	24	26	0
2027	30	20	0

State government full or split control, by party.

Year	Democrats	Republicans	Split
1977	27	1	22
1978	27	1	22
1979	19	5	26
1980	18	5	27
1981	16	8	26
1982	16	8	26
1983	24	4	22
1984	24	4	22
1985	17	4	29
1986	17	4	29
1987	15	7	28
1988	14	6	30
1989	15	5	30
1990	16	5	29
1991	16	3	31
1992	15	3	32
1993	18	3	29
1994	16	4	30
1995	8	15	27
1996	6	14	30
1997	5	12	33
1998	5	13	32
1999	8	15	27
2000	9	16	25
2001	8	14	28
2002	9	12	29
2003	8	12	30
2004	8	12	30
2005	8	12	30
2006	8	12	30
2007	15	10	25
2008	14	10	26
2009	18	10	22
2010	17	10	23
2011	11	22	17
2012	11	24	15
2013	13	25	12
2014	13	24	13
2015	7	24	19
2016	7	23	20
2017	5	25	20
2018	7	25	18
2019	14	22	14
2020	15	21	14
2021	15	23	12
2022	14	23	13
2023	17	22	11
2024	17	23	10
2025	15	23	12
2026	16	23	11

View source data.

== See also ==
- Red states and blue states
