= Phil Swing =

American politician (1884–1963)

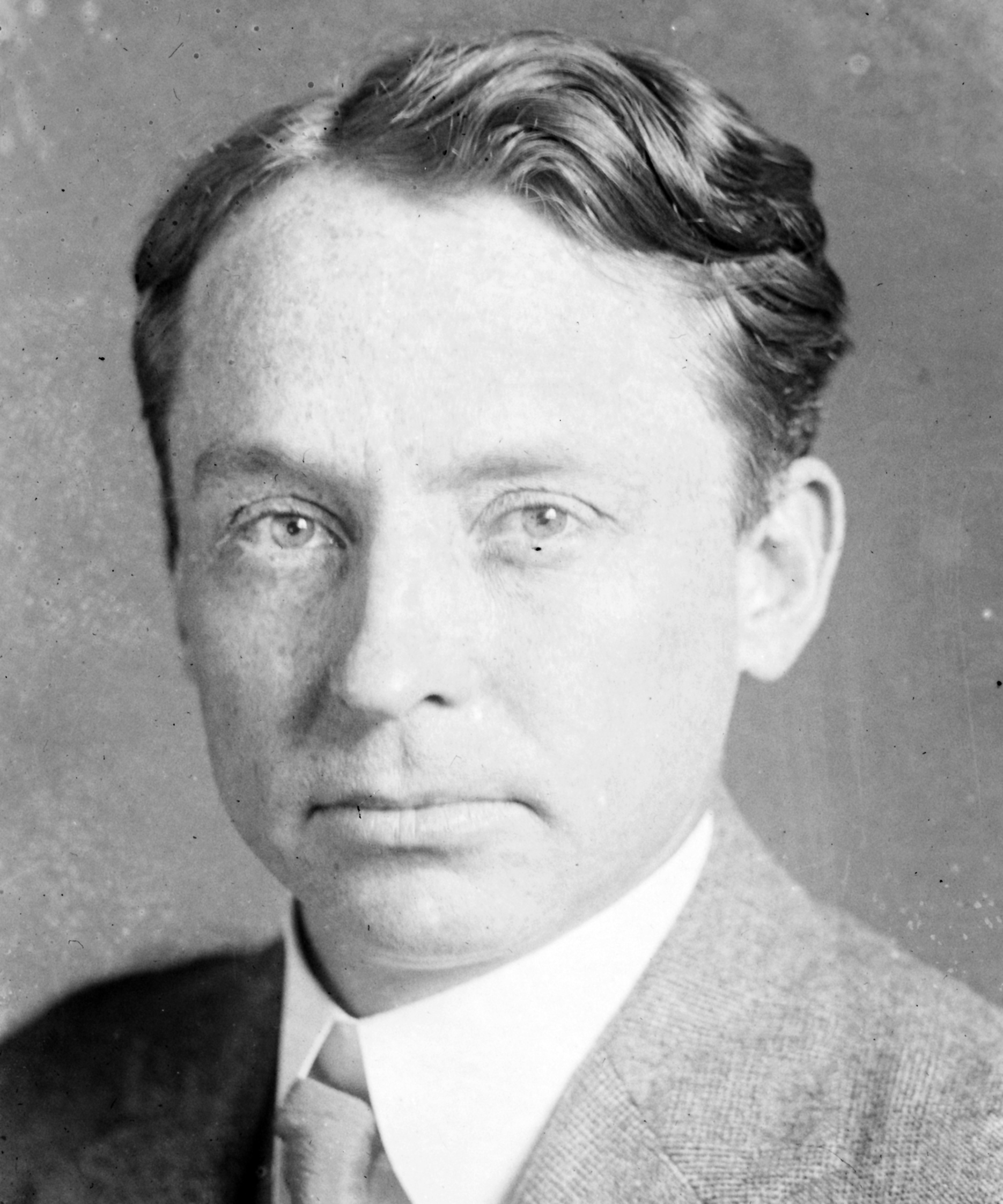

Member of the U.S. House of Representatives from California's 11th district
- In office March 4, 1921 – March 3, 1933
- Preceded by: William Kettner
- Succeeded by: William E. Evans

Personal details
- Born: Philip David Swing; November 30, 1884 San Bernardino, California
- Died: August 8, 1963 (aged 78) San Diego, California
- Resting place: Greenwood Memorial Park, San Diego
- Party: Republican
- Spouse: Nell Cremeens (m. 1912)

Philip David Swing (November 30, 1884 – August 8, 1963) was an American Republican politician from Imperial County, California. He served six terms in the United States House of Representatives from 1921 to 1933.

== Biography ==
Swing was born in 1884 in San Bernardino, California to James and Mary Swing. He attended the public schools and graduated in 1905 from Stanford University. He was a first lieutenant in the California National Guard during 1906–1908. Swing studied law and was admitted to the bar in 1907.

=== Early career ===
He was city attorney of Brawley, California in 1908 and 1909, deputy district attorney of Imperial County 1908–1911, district attorney 1911–1915, chief counsel of the Imperial Irrigation District 1916–1919, and Judge of the Imperial County Superior Court 1919–1921. During 1920–1932 Swing was delegate to the Republican State conventions at Sacramento, serving as chairman in 1926. During World War I he served as a private in the Officers Training Camp in 1918.

=== Marriage ===
Swing was married to Nell Cremeens in 1912.

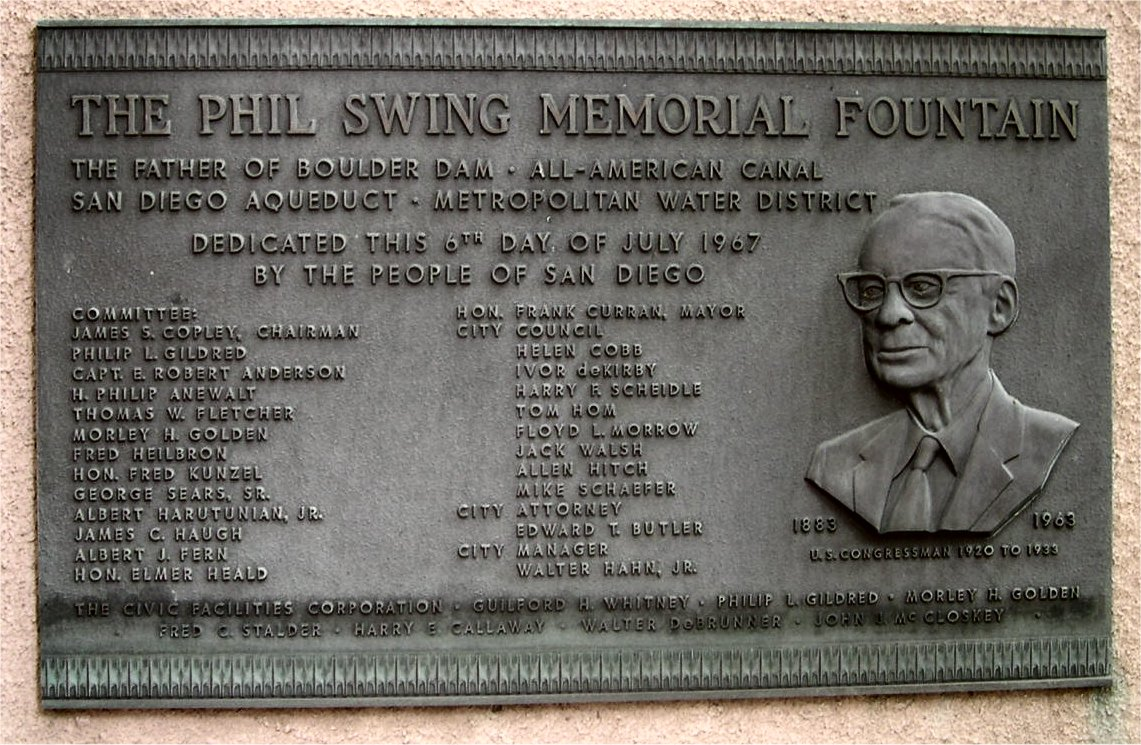
Phil Swing Memorial Fountain was installed at the southwest portion of San Diego Civic Center, next to the entrance to the City Administration Building. In 2015, due to water conservation efforts, the fountain was filled in with soil and turned into a xeroscape planter.

=== Congress ===
Swing was first elected to the House of Representatives in 1920. He replaced William Kettner in representing the 11th District, which included both Imperial County and San Diego County. He had a folksy manner and during his six terms, 1921–1933, as a progressive Republican, he focused on water issues. He worked especially hard to obtain water from the Colorado River by building Boulder Dam. His single-minded determination resulted in 1928 in the Swing-Johnson Act, co-sponsored by Sen. Hiram Johnson, which authorized Boulder Dam. This was in the face of opposition from the State of Arizona, private power companies, and bureaucratic inertia. The project brought water to Southern California and enabled San Diego to grow and prosper.

=== Later career ===
In 1932 he chose not to run for re-election, and joined a law firm in San Diego. In 1933, as one of his last acts in Congress, he introduced a bill to establish Anza-Borrego Desert State Park, which passed in March.

In 1945, Swing was appointed a member of the California State Water Resources Board, serving until 1958.

=== Death and burial ===
Swing died in 1963 in San Diego and is buried at Greenwood Memorial Park.

== Legacy ==
A water fountain at the Community Concourse at Third and C Streets is dedicated to Phil Swing, "The Father of Boulder Dam."

== Electoral history ==
1920 United States House of Representatives elections in California
Party	Candidate	Votes	%
Republican	Phil Swing	59,425	72.9
Democratic	Hugh L. Dickson	22,144	27.1
Total votes		81,569	100.0
Turnout			
Republican gain from Democratic			

1922 United States House of Representatives elections in California
Party	Candidate	Votes	%
Republican	Phil Swing (Incumbent)	79,039	91.4
Prohibition	Charles H. Randall	7,466	8.6
Total votes		86,505	100.0
Turnout			
Republican hold			

1924 United States House of Representatives elections in California
Party	Candidate	Votes	%
Republican	Phil Swing (Incumbent)	93,811	100.0
Turnout			
Republican hold			

1926 United States House of Representatives elections in California
Party	Candidate	Votes	%
Republican	Phil Swing (Incumbent)	89,726	100.0
Turnout			
Republican hold			

1928 United States House of Representatives elections in California
Party	Candidate	Votes	%
Republican	Phil Swing (Incumbent)	127,115	100.0
Turnout			
Republican hold			

1930 United States House of Representatives elections in California
Party	Candidate	Votes	%
Republican	Phil Swing (Incumbent)	124,092	100.0
Turnout			
Republican hold			

== See also ==
- Philip David Swing Papers, UCLA Research Library
- Phil Swing and Boulder Dam (UC Press, 1971) by Beverly B. Moeller. Also her Ph.D. dissertation, UCLA 1968.
- Heilbron, Carl (1936). History of San Diego County. San Diego Press Club. Biography, pp. 147–148; includes portrait

U.S. House of Representatives
Preceded by William Kettner	Member of the U.S. House of Representatives from California's 11th congressional district 1921–1933	Succeeded by William E. Evans
