= 1912 United States House of Representatives elections in California =

United States House of Representatives elections in California, 1912
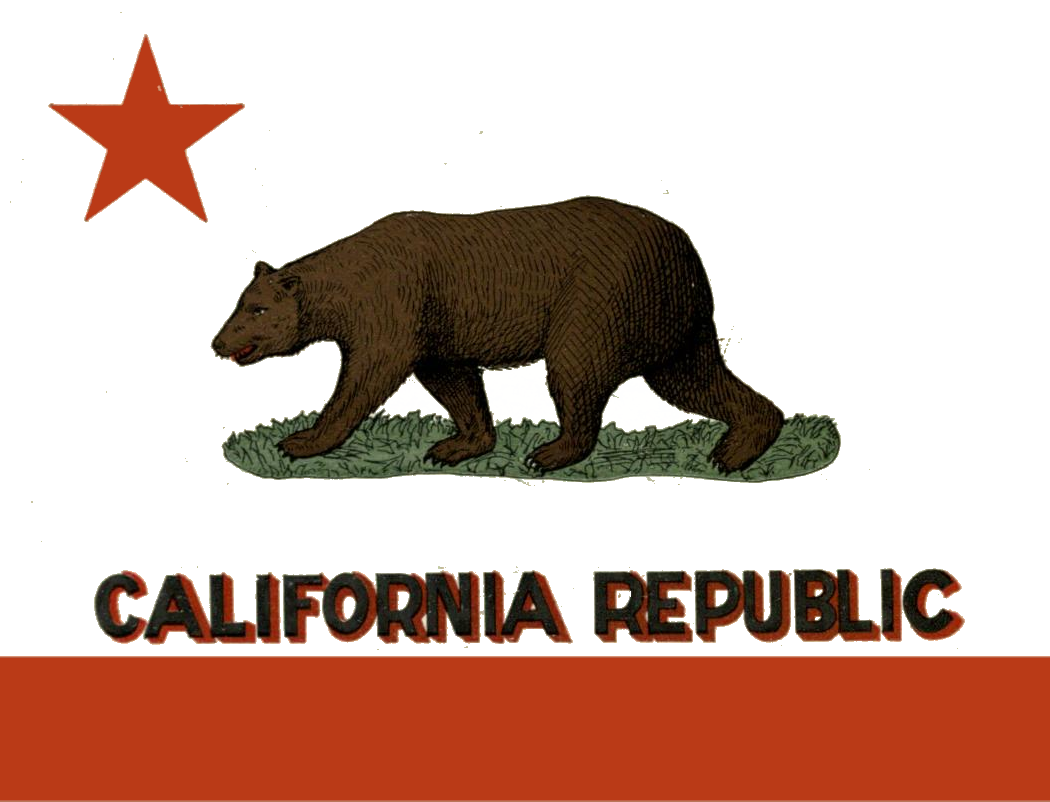
- November 5, 1912

All 11 California seats to the United States House of Representatives
	Majority party	Minority party	Third party
Party	Republican	Democratic	Progressive
Last election	7	1	did not contest
Seats before	6	1	0
Seats won	6	3	1
Seat change	Steady	▲2	▲1
Popular vote	243,585	178,094	51,762
Percentage	40.4%	29.6%	8.6%
	Fourth party
Party	Independent
Last election	0
Seats before	1
Seat change	Steady
Popular vote	20,341
Percentage	3.4%
- Republican hold Republican gain (new seats) Democratic hold Democratic gain Progressive hold Independent hold

The United States House of Representatives elections in California, 1912 was an election for California's delegation to the United States House of Representatives, which occurred as part of the general election of the House of Representatives on November 5, 1912. California gained three seats as a result of the 1910 census, all of which were won by Republicans. Of California's existing districts, Republicans lost three, two to Democrats and one to a Republican-turned-Progressive.

== Overview ==
United States House of Representatives elections in California, 1912
Party	Votes	Percentage	Seats	+/–
Republican	243,585	40.4%	6	0
Democratic	178,094	29.6%	3	+2
Socialist	107,551	17.9%	0	0
Progressive	51,762	8.6%	1	+1
Prohibition	21,309	3.5%	0	0
Independent	20,341	3.4%	1	0
Totals	602,301	100.0%	11	+3

== Delegation composition ==
Pre-election	Seats
Republican-Held	6
Democratic-Held	1
Independent-Held	1

Post-election	Seats
Republican-Held	6
Democratic-Held	3
Independent-Held	1
Progressive-Held	1

== Results ==
=== District 1 ===
California's 1st congressional district election, 1912
Party	Candidate	Votes	%
Independent	William Kent (incumbent)	20,341	48.1
Democratic	I. G. Zumwalt	18,756	34.4
Republican	Edward H. Hart	10,585	19.4
Socialist	Joseph Bredsteen	4,892	9.0
Total votes		54,574	100.0
Turnout			
Independent hold			

=== District 2 ===
California's 2nd congressional district election, 1912
Party	Candidate	Votes	%
Democratic	John E. Raker (incumbent)	23,467	62.6
Republican	Frank M. Rutherford	10,178	27.2
Socialist	J. C. Williams	3,818	10.2
Total votes		37,463	100.0
Turnout			
Democratic hold			

=== District 3 ===
California's 3rd congressional district election, 1912
Party	Candidate	Votes	%
Republican	Charles F. Curry	31,060	58.8
Democratic	Gilbert M. Ross	15,197	28.8
Socialist	William L. Wilson	6,522	12.4
Total votes		52,779	100.0
Turnout			
Republican win (new seat)			

=== District 4 ===
California's 4th congressional district election, 1912
Party	Candidate	Votes	%
Republican	Julius Kahn (incumbent)	25,515	56.1
Democratic	Bert Schlesinger	14,884	32.7
Socialist	Norman W. Pendleton	5,090	11.2
Total votes		45,489	100.0
Turnout			
Republican hold			

=== District 5 ===
California's 5th congressional district election, 1912
Party	Candidate	Votes	%
Republican	John I. Nolan	27,902	52.3
Democratic	Stephen V. Costello	18,516	34.7
Socialist	E. L. Requin	6,962	13.0
Total votes		53,380	100.0
Turnout			
Republican win (new seat)			

=== District 6 ===
California's 6th congressional district election, 1912
Party	Candidate	Votes	%
Republican	Joseph R. Knowland (incumbent)	35,219	53.7
Socialist	J. Stitt Wilson	26,234	40.0
Democratic	Hiram A. Luttrell	4,135	6.3
Total votes		65,588	100.0
Turnout			
Republican hold			

=== District 7 ===
California's 7th congressional district election, 1912
Party	Candidate	Votes	%
Democratic	Denver S. Church	23,752	44.0
Republican	James C. Needham (incumbent)	22,994	42.7
Socialist	J. S. Cato	7,171	13.3
Total votes		53,917	100.0
Turnout			
Democratic gain from Republican			

=== District 8 ===
California's 8th congressional district election, 1912
Party	Candidate	Votes	%
Republican	Everis A. Hayes (incumbent)	29,861	50.9
Democratic	James B. Holohan	20,620	35.2
Progressive	Robert Whitaker	8,125	13.9
Total votes		58,606	100.0
Turnout			
Republican hold			

=== District 9 ===
California's 9th congressional district election, 1912
Party	Candidate	Votes	%
Republican	Charles W. Bell	28,845	47.2
Democratic	Thomas H. Kirk	14,571	23.9
Socialist	Ralph L. Criswell	11,123	18.2
Prohibition	George S. Yarnall	6,510	10.7
Total votes		61,049	100.0
Turnout			
Republican win (new seat)			

=== District 10 ===
California's 10th congressional district election, 1912
Party	Candidate	Votes	%
Progressive	William Stephens (incumbent)	43,637	53.4
Democratic	George Ringo	17,890	21.9
Socialist	Fred C. Wheeler	17,126	21.0
Prohibition	Emory D. Martindale	2,995	3.7
Total votes		81,648	100.0
Turnout			
Progressive gain from Republican			

=== District 11 ===
California's 11th congressional district election, 1912
Party	Candidate	Votes	%
Democratic	William Kettner	24,822	42.7
Republican	Samuel C. Evans	21,426	36.8
Socialist	Noble A. Richardson	7,059	12.1
Prohibition	Helen M. Stoddard	4,842	8.3
Total votes		46,248	100.0
Turnout			
Democratic gain from Republican			

== See also ==
- 63rd United States Congress
- Political party strength in California
- Political party strength in U.S. states
- United States House of Representatives elections, 1912
