= 1914 United States House of Representatives elections in California =

United States House of Representatives elections in California, 1914
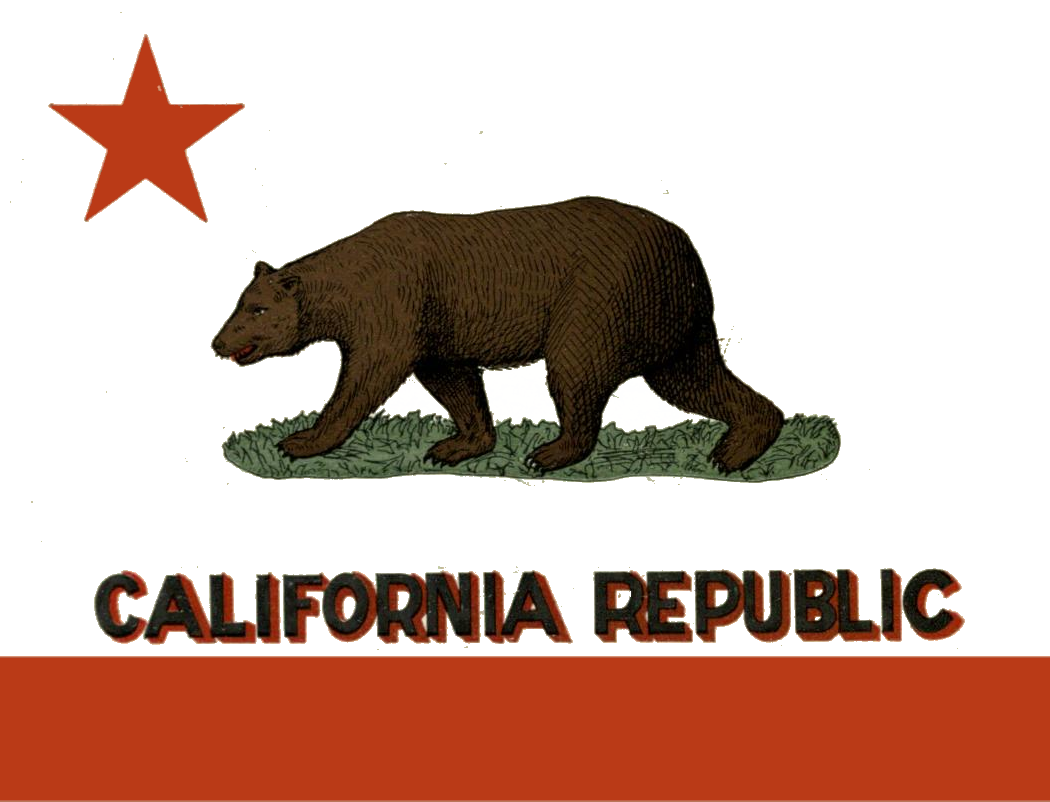
- November 3, 1914

All 11 California seats to the United States House of Representatives
	Majority party	Minority party	Third party
Party	Republican	Democratic	Progressive
Last election	6	3	1
Seats won	4	3	2
Seat change	▼2	Steady	▲1
Popular vote	380,493	158,476	141,571
Percentage	44.5%	18.5%	16.5%
	Fourth party	Fifth party	Sixth party
Party	Prohibition	Independent	Socialist
Last election	0	1	0
Seats won	1	1	0
Seat change	▲1	Steady	Steady
Popular vote	71,589	35,403	68,215
Percentage	8.4%	4.1%	8.0%
- Results: Republican hold Democratic hold Progressive hold Progressive gain Prohibition gain Independent hold

The United States House of Representatives elections in California, 1914 was an election for California's delegation to the United States House of Representatives, which occurred as part of the general election of the House of Representatives on November 3, 1914. Republicans lost two seats, one to the Progressive Party and one to the Prohibition Party.

== Overview ==
United States House of Representatives elections in California, 1916
Party	Votes	Percentage	Seats	+/–
Republican	380,493	44.5%	4	▼2
Democratic	158,476	18.5%	3	Steady
Progressive	141,571	16.5%	2	▲1
Prohibition	71,589	8.4%	1	▲1
Socialist	68,215	8.0%	0	Steady
Independent	35,403	4.1%	1	Steady
Totals	855,747	100.0%	11	—

== Delegation composition ==
Pre-election	Seats
Republican-Held	6
Democratic-Held	3
Independent-Held	1
Progressive-Held	1

Post-election	Seats
Republican-Held	4
Democratic-Held	3
Progressive-Held	2
Independent-Held	1
Prohibition-Held	1

== Results ==
=== District 1 ===
California's 1st congressional district election, 1914
Party	Candidate	Votes	%
Independent	William Kent (incumbent)	35,403	48.1
Republican	Edward H. Hart	28,166	38.3
Democratic	O. F. Meldon	7,987	10.8
Prohibition	Henry P. Stipp	2,068	2.8
Total votes		73,624	100.0
Turnout			
Independent hold			

=== District 2 ===
California's 2nd congressional district election, 1914
Party	Candidate	Votes	%
Democratic	John E. Raker (incumbent)	32,575	64.7
Republican	James T. Matlock	15,716	31.2
Prohibition	W. P. Fassett	2,086	4.1
Total votes		50,377	100.0
Turnout			
Democratic hold			

=== District 3 ===
California's 3rd congressional district election, 1914
Party	Candidate	Votes	%
Republican	Charles F. Curry (incumbent)	66,034	85.0
Socialist	David T. Ross	6,752	8.7
Prohibition	Edwin F. Van Vlear	4,911	6.3
Total votes		77,697	100.0
Turnout			
Republican hold			

=== District 4 ===
California's 4th congressional district election, 1914
Party	Candidate	Votes	%
Republican	Julius Kahn (incumbent)	41,044	69.1
Democratic	Henry Colombat	13,550	22.8
Socialist	Allen K. Gifford	3,928	6.6
Prohibition	J. C. Westenberg	895	1.5
Total votes		59,417	100.0
Turnout			
Republican hold			

=== District 5 ===
California's 5th congressional district election, 1914
Party	Candidate	Votes	%
Republican	John I. Nolan (incumbent)	53,875	83.3
Socialist	Mads Peter Christensen	7,366	11.4
Prohibition	Frederick Head	3,410	5.3
Total votes		64,651	100.0
Turnout			
Republican hold			

=== District 6 ===
California's 6th congressional district election, 1914
Party	Candidate	Votes	%
Progressive	John A. Elston	36,164	44.4
Republican	George H. Derrick	30,704	37.7
Socialist	Howard H. Caldwell	11,355	13.9
Prohibition	Harlow E. Wolcott	3,211	3.9
Total votes		81,434	100.0
Turnout			
Progressive gain from Republican			

=== District 7 ===
California's 7th congressional district election, 1914
Party	Candidate	Votes	%
Democratic	Denver S. Church (incumbent)	39,389	49.9
Republican	A. M. Drew	25,106	31.8
Socialist	Harry M. McKee	7,797	9.9
Prohibition	Don A. Allen	6,573	8.3
Total votes		78,865	100.0
Turnout			
Democratic hold			

=== District 8 ===
California's 8th congressional district election, 1914
Party	Candidate	Votes	%
Republican	Everis A. Hayes (incumbent)	36,499	49.1
Progressive	Lewis Dan Bohnett	33,706	45.3
Prohibition	Joseph Merritt Horton	4,157	5.6
Total votes		74,362	100.0
Turnout			
Republican hold			

=== District 9 ===
California's 9th congressional district election, 1914
Party	Candidate	Votes	%
Prohibition	Charles Hiram Randall	28,097	30.9
Progressive	Charles W. Bell (incumbent)	27,560	30.3
Republican	Frank C. Roberts	25,176	27.7
Socialist	Henry A. Hart	10,084	11.1
Total votes		90,917	100.0
Turnout			
Prohibition gain from Progressive			

=== District 10 ===
California's 10th congressional district election, 1914
Party	Candidate	Votes	%
Progressive	William Stephens (incumbent)	44,141	38.4
Republican	Henry Z. Osborne	33,172	28.9
Democratic	Nathan Newby	17,810	15.5
Socialist	Ralph L. Criswell	14,900	13.0
Prohibition	Henry Clay Needham	4,903	4.3
Total votes		70,926	100.0
Turnout			
Progressive hold			

=== District 11 ===
California's 11th congressional district election, 1914
Party	Candidate	Votes	%
Democratic	William Kettner (incumbent)	47,165	52.7
Republican	James Carson Needham	25,001	27.9
Prohibition	James S. Edwards	11,278	12.7
Socialist	Casper Bauer	6,033	6.7
Total votes		89,477	100.0
Turnout			
Democratic hold			

== See also ==
- 64th United States Congress
- Political party strength in California
- Political party strength in U.S. states
- United States House of Representatives elections, 1914
