= 1922 United States House of Representatives elections in California =

United States House of Representatives elections in California, 1922
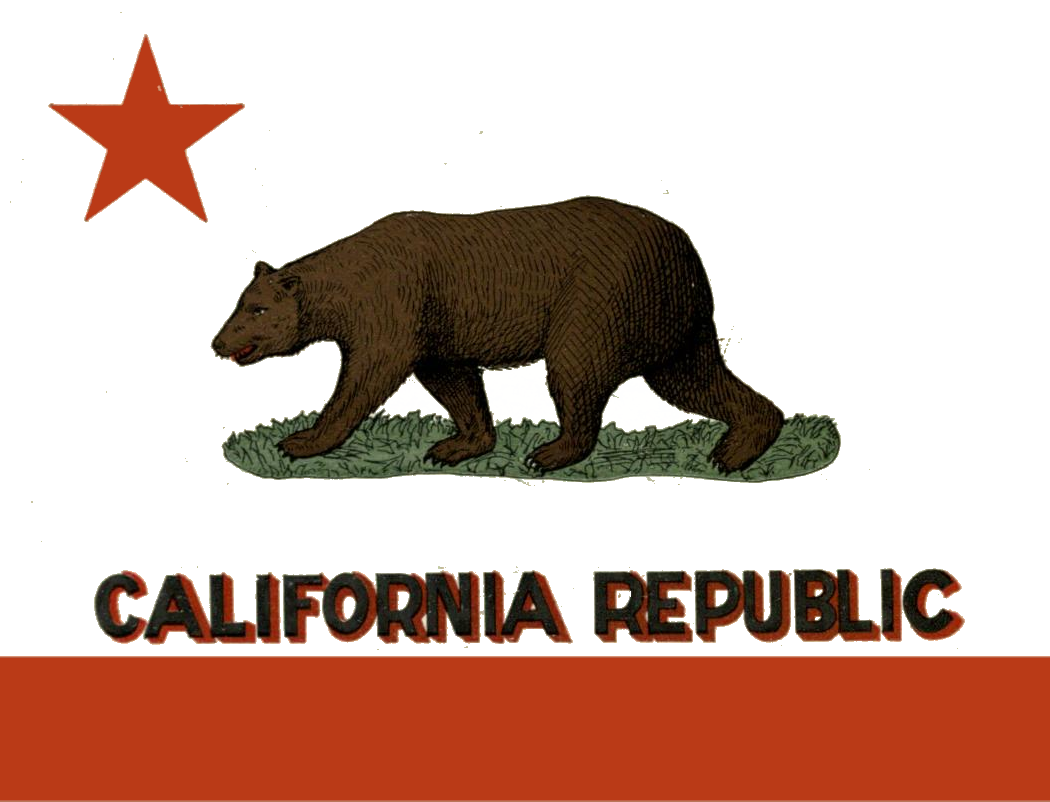
- November 7, 1922

All 11 California seats to the United States House of Representatives
	Majority party	Minority party
Party	Republican	Democratic
Last election	9	2
Seats won	9	2
Seat change	Steady	Steady
Popular vote	596,084	108,821
Percentage	76.2%	13.9%
- Republican hold Democratic hold

The United States House of Representatives elections in California, 1922 was an election for California's delegation to the United States House of Representatives, which occurred as part of the general election of the House of Representatives on November 7, 1922. The districts were not reapportioned after the 1920 census (California would have gained three districts as a result of the 1920 census), so the state's delegation remained at 11 representatives, and the partisan makeup remained unchanged, at 9 Republicans and 2 Democrats.

== Overview ==
United States House of Representatives elections in California, 1922
Party	Votes	Percentage	Seats
Republican	596,084	76.2%	9
Democratic	108,821	13.9%	2
Prohibition	53,260	6.8%	0
Socialist	23,724	3.0%	0
Totals	781,889	100.0%	11

== Results ==
Final results from the Clerk of the House of Representatives:

=== District 1 ===
California's 1st congressional district election, 1922
Party	Candidate	Votes	%
Democratic	Clarence F. Lea (incumbent)	53,129	100.0
Turnout			
Democratic hold			

=== District 2 ===
California's 2nd congressional district election, 1922
Party	Candidate	Votes	%
Democratic	John E. Raker (incumbent)	32,981	100.0
Turnout			
Democratic hold			

=== District 3 ===
California's 3rd congressional district election, 1922
Party	Candidate	Votes	%
Republican	Charles F. Curry (incumbent)	71,316	91.6
Socialist	Marcus H. Steely	6,561	8.4
Total votes		77,877	100.0
Turnout			
Republican hold			

=== District 4 ===
California's 4th congressional district election, 1922
Party	Candidate	Votes	%
Republican	Julius Kahn (incumbent)	46,527	83
Socialist	Hugo Ernst	9,547	17
Total votes		56,074	100
Turnout			
Republican hold			

=== District 5 ===
California's 5th congressional district election, 1922
Party	Candidate	Votes	%
Republican	John I. Nolan (incumbent)	49,414	100.0
Turnout			
Republican hold			

=== District 6 ===
California's 6th congressional district election, 1928
Party	Candidate	Votes	%
Republican	James H. MacLafferty (incumbent)	59,858	66.4
Democratic	Hugh W. Brunk	22,711	25.2
Socialist	Elvina S. Beals	7,616	8.4
Total votes		90,185	100.0
Turnout			
Republican hold			

=== District 7 ===
California's 7th congressional district election, 1922
Party	Candidate	Votes	%
Republican	Henry E. Barbour (incumbent)	67,000	100.0
Turnout			
Republican hold			

=== District 8 ===
California's 8th congressional district election, 1922
Party	Candidate	Votes	%
Republican	Arthur M. Free (incumbent)	57,926	100.0
Turnout			
Republican hold			

=== District 9 ===
California's 9th congressional district election, 1922
Party	Candidate	Votes	%
Republican	Walter F. Lineberger (incumbent)	66,265	59.1
Prohibition	Charles H. Randall	45,794	40.9
Total votes		112,059	100.0
Turnout			
Republican hold			

=== District 10 ===
California's 10th congressional district election, 1922
Party	Candidate	Votes	%
Republican	Henry Z. Osborne (incumbent)	98,739	100.0
Turnout			
Republican hold			

=== District 11 ===
California's 11th congressional district election, 1922
Party	Candidate	Votes	%
Republican	Philip D. Swing (incumbent)	79,039	91.4
Prohibition	George Bauer	7,466	8.6
Total votes		86,505	100.0
Turnout			
Republican hold			

== See also ==
- 68th United States Congress
- Political party strength in California
- Political party strength in U.S. states
- 1922 United States House of Representatives elections
