= 1916 United States House of Representatives elections in California =

United States House of Representatives elections in California, 1916
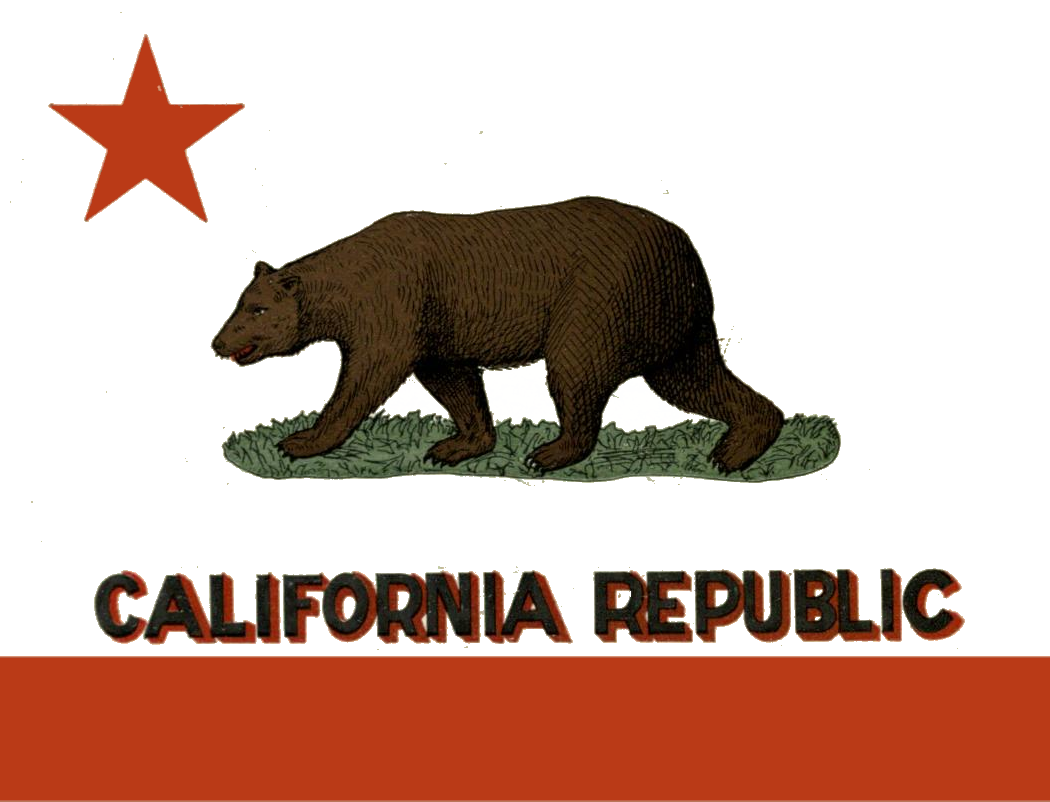
- November 7, 1916

All 11 California seats to the United States House of Representatives
	Majority party	Minority party
Party	Republican	Democratic
Last election	4	3
Seats before	5	3
Seats won	5	4
Seat change	Steady	▲1
Popular vote	396,345	204,381
Percentage	44.9%	23.2%
	Third party	Fourth party
Party	Prohibition	Progressive
Last election	1	2
Seats before	1	1
Seats won	1	1
Seat change	Steady	Steady
Popular vote	99,669	88,401
Percentage	11.3%	10.0%
- Republican hold Democratic hold Democratic gain Progressive hold Prohibition hold

The United States House of Representatives elections in California, 1916 were elections for California's delegation to the United States House of Representatives, which occurred as part of the general election of the House of Representatives on November 7, 1916. The delegation's only Independent incumbent retired, and the open seat was won by the Democrats.

== Overview ==
United States House of Representatives elections in California, 1916
Party	Votes	Percentage	Seats	+/–
Republican	396,345	44.9%	5	0
Democratic	204,381	23.2%	4	+1
Prohibition	99,669	11.3%	1	0
Progressive	88,401	10.0%	1	0
Socialist	59,886	6.8%	0	0
Independent	33,270	3.8%	0	-1
Totals	881,952	100.0%	11	—

== Delegation composition ==
Pre-election	Seats
Republican-Held	6
Democratic-Held	3
Progressive-Held	2
Independent-Held	1
Prohibition-Held	1

Post-election	Seats
Republican-Held	6
Democratic-Held	4
Prohibition-Held	1
Progressive-Held	1

== Results ==
=== District 1 ===
California's 1st congressional district election, 1916
Party	Candidate	Votes	%
Democratic	Clarence F. Lea	32,797	48.8
Republican	Edward H. Hart	28,769	42.8
Socialist	Mary M. Morgan	3,730	5.5
Prohibition	Jay Scott Ryder	1,935	2.9
Total votes		67,231	100.0
Turnout			
Democratic gain from Independent			

=== District 2 ===
California's 2nd congressional district election, 1916
Party	Candidate	Votes	%
Democratic	John E. Raker (incumbent)	30,042	71
Republican	Edward H. Hart	12,282	29
Total votes		42,324	100
Turnout			
Democratic hold			

=== District 3 ===
California's 3rd congressional district election, 1916
Party	Candidate	Votes	%
Republican	Charles F. Curry (incumbent)	48,193	66.7
Democratic	O. W. Kennedy	16,900	23.4
Socialist	Ben Cooper	4,455	6.2
Prohibition	Edwin F. Van Vlear	2,694	3.7
Total votes		72,242	100.0
Turnout			
Republican hold			

=== District 4 ===
California's 4th congressional district election, 1916
Party	Candidate	Votes	%
Republican	Julius Kahn (incumbent)	51,968	77.2
Democratic	J. M. Fernald	10,579	15.7
Socialist	Allen K. Gifford	3,775	5.6
Prohibition	Henry W. Hutchinson	981	1.5
Total votes		67,303	100.0
Turnout			
Republican hold			

=== District 5 ===
California's 5th congressional district election, 1916
Party	Candidate	Votes	%
Republican	John I. Nolan (incumbent)	59,333	84.7
Socialist	Charles A. Preston	6,708	9.6
Prohibition	Frederick Head	4,046	5.8
Total votes		70,087	100.0
Turnout			
Republican hold			

=== District 6 ===
California's 6th congressional district election, 1916
Party	Candidate	Votes	%
Progressive	John A. Elston (incumbent)	56,520	64.6
Republican	H. Avery Whitney	19,787	22.6
Socialist	Luella Twining	7,588	8.7
Prohibition	Harlow E. Wolcott	3,605	4.1
Total votes		87,500	100.0
Turnout			
Progressive hold			

=== District 7 ===
California's 7th congressional district election, 1916
Party	Candidate	Votes	%
Democratic	Denver S. Church (incumbent)	38,787	51.0
Republican	W. W. Phillips	27,676	36.4
Socialist	Harry M. McKee	5,492	7.2
Prohibition	J. F. Butler	4,042	5.3
Total votes		75,997	100.0
Turnout			
Democratic hold			

=== District 8 ===
California's 8th congressional district election, 1916
Party	Candidate	Votes	%
Republican	Everis A. Hayes (incumbent)	50,659	68.6
Progressive	George S. Walker	17,576	23.8
Socialist	Cora Pattleton Wilson	5,564	7.5
Total votes		73,799	100.0
Turnout			
Republican hold			

=== District 9 ===
California's 9th congressional district election, 1916
Party	Candidate	Votes	%
Prohibition	Charles H. Randall (incumbent)	58,826	57.8
Independent	Charles W. Bell	33,270	32.7
Socialist	Ralph L. Criswell	9,661	9.5
Total votes		101,757	100.0
Turnout			
Prohibition hold			

=== District 10 ===
California's 10th congressional district election, 1916
Party	Candidate	Votes	%
Republican	Henry Z. Osborne	63,913	49.5
Democratic	Rufus W. Bowden	33,225	25.7
Progressive	Henry Stanley Benedict	14,305	11.1
Socialist	James H. Ryckman	9,000	7.0
Prohibition	Henry Clay Needham	8,781	6.8
Total votes		129,224	100.0
Turnout			
Republican hold			

=== District 11 ===
California's 11th congressional district election, 1916
Party	Candidate	Votes	%
Democratic	William Kettner (incumbent)	42,051	44.5
Republican	Robert C. Harbison	33,765	35.7
Prohibition	James S. Edwards	14,759	15.6
Socialist	Marcus W. Robbins	3,913	4.1
Total votes		94,488	100.0
Turnout			
Democratic hold			

== See also ==
- 65th United States Congress
- Political party strength in California
- Political party strength in U.S. states
- United States House of Representatives elections, 1916
