= 1918 United States House of Representatives elections in California =

United States House of Representatives elections in California, 1918
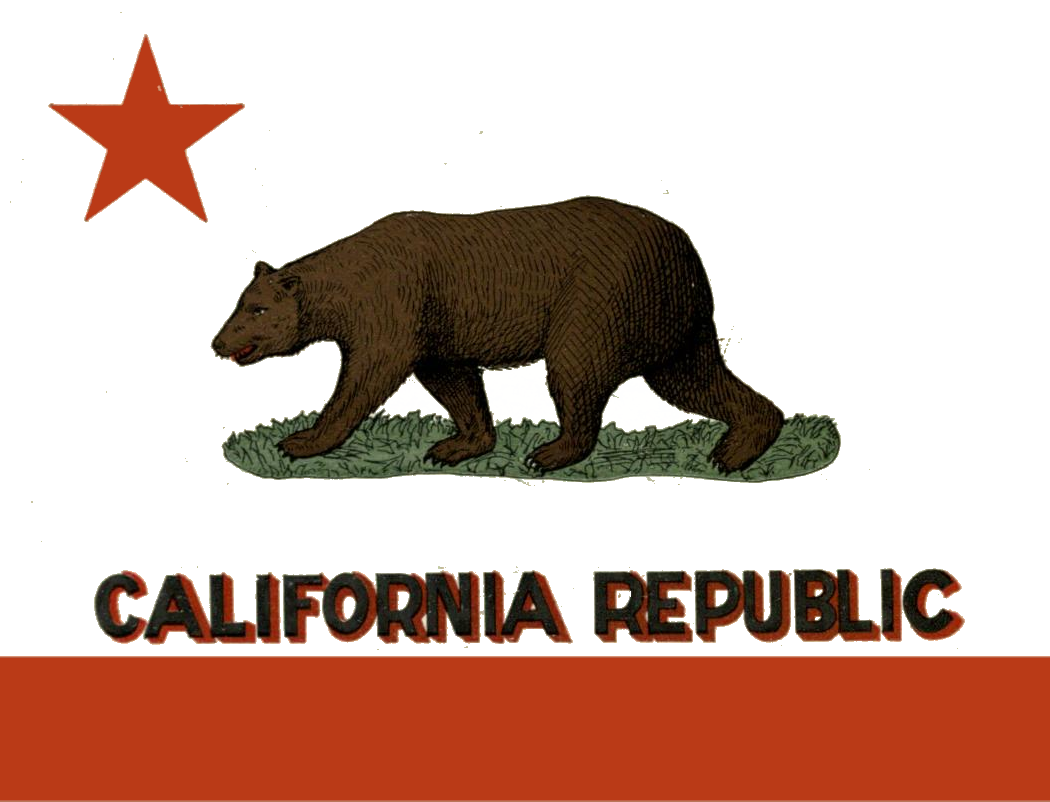
- November 5, 1918

All 11 California seats to the United States House of Representatives
	Majority party	Minority party	Third party
Party	Republican	Democratic	Prohibition
Last election	5	4	1
Seats before	6	4	1
Seats won	6	4	1
Seat change	Steady	Steady	Steady
Popular vote	355,004	178,139	56,424
Percentage	56.7%	28.4%	9.0%
- Republican hold Republican gain Democratic hold Democratic gain Prohibition hold

The United States House of Representatives elections in California, 1918 was an election for California's delegation to the United States House of Representatives, which occurred as part of the general election of the House of Representatives on November 5, 1918. Democrats and Republicans swapped seats, leaving California's House delegation unchanged at 6 Republicans, 4 Democrats, and 1 Prohibition incumbent.

== Overview ==
United States House of Representatives elections in California, 1918
Party	Votes	Percentage	Seats
Republican	355,004	56.7%	6
Democratic	178,139	28.4%	4
Prohibition	56,424	9.0%	1
Socialist	36,855	5.9%	0
Totals	626,422	100.0%	11

== Results ==
=== District 1 ===
California's 1st congressional district election, 1918
Party	Candidate	Votes	%
Democratic	Clarence F. Lea (incumbent)	42,063	100.0
Turnout			
Democratic hold			

=== District 2 ===
California's 2nd congressional district election, 1918
Party	Candidate	Votes	%
Democratic	John E. Raker (incumbent)	28,249	100.0
Turnout			
Democratic hold			

=== District 3 ===
California's 3rd congressional district election, 1918
Party	Candidate	Votes	%
Republican	Charles F. Curry (incumbent)	51,690	91.6
Socialist	Allen K. Gifford	4,746	8.4
Total votes		56,436	100.0
Turnout			
Republican hold			

=== District 4 ===
California's 4th congressional district election, 1918
Party	Candidate	Votes	%
Republican	Julius Kahn (incumbent)	38,278	86.6
Socialist	Hugo Ernst	5,913	13.4
Total votes		43,191	100.0
Turnout			
Republican hold			

=== District 5 ===
California's 5th congressional district election, 1918
Party	Candidate	Votes	%
Republican	John I. Nolan (incumbent)	40,375	87
Socialist	Thomas F. Feeley	6,032	13
Total votes		46,407	100.0
Turnout			
Republican hold			

=== District 6 ===
California's 6th congressional district election, 1918
Party	Candidate	Votes	%
Republican	John A. Elston (incumbent)	59,082	88.4
Socialist	Luella Twining	7,721	11.6
Total votes		66,803	100.0
Turnout			
Republican hold			

=== District 7 ===
California's 7th congressional district election, 1918
Party	Candidate	Votes	%
Republican	Henry E. Barbour	33,476	52.1
Democratic	Henry Hawson	30,745	47.9
Total votes		64,221	100.0
Turnout			
Republican gain from Democratic			

=== District 8 ===
California's 8th congressional district election, 1918
Party	Candidate	Votes	%
Democratic	Hugh S. Hersman	31,167	53
Republican	Everis A. Hayes (incumbent)	27,641	47
Total votes		58,808	100
Turnout			
Democratic gain from Republican			

=== District 9 ===
California's 9th congressional district election, 1918
Party	Candidate	Votes	%
Prohibition	Charles H. Randall (incumbent)	38,782	53.0
Republican	Montaville Flowers	31,689	43.3
Socialist	Grace Silver Henry	2,718	3.7
Total votes		73,189	100.0
Turnout			
Prohibition hold			

=== District 10 ===
California's 10th congressional district election, 1918
Party	Candidate	Votes	%
Republican	Henry Z. Osborne (incumbent)	72,773	88.2
Socialist	James H. Ryckman	9,725	11.8
Total votes		82,498	100.0
Turnout			
Republican hold			

=== District 11 ===
California's 11th congressional district election, 1918
Party	Candidate	Votes	%
Democratic	William Kettner (incumbent)	45,915	72.2
Prohibition	Stella B. Irvine	17,642	27.8
Total votes		63,557	100.0
Turnout			
Democratic hold			

== See also ==
- 66th United States Congress
- Political party strength in California
- Political party strength in U.S. states
- United States House of Representatives elections, 1918
