= 1928 United States Senate election in California =

- November 6, 1928
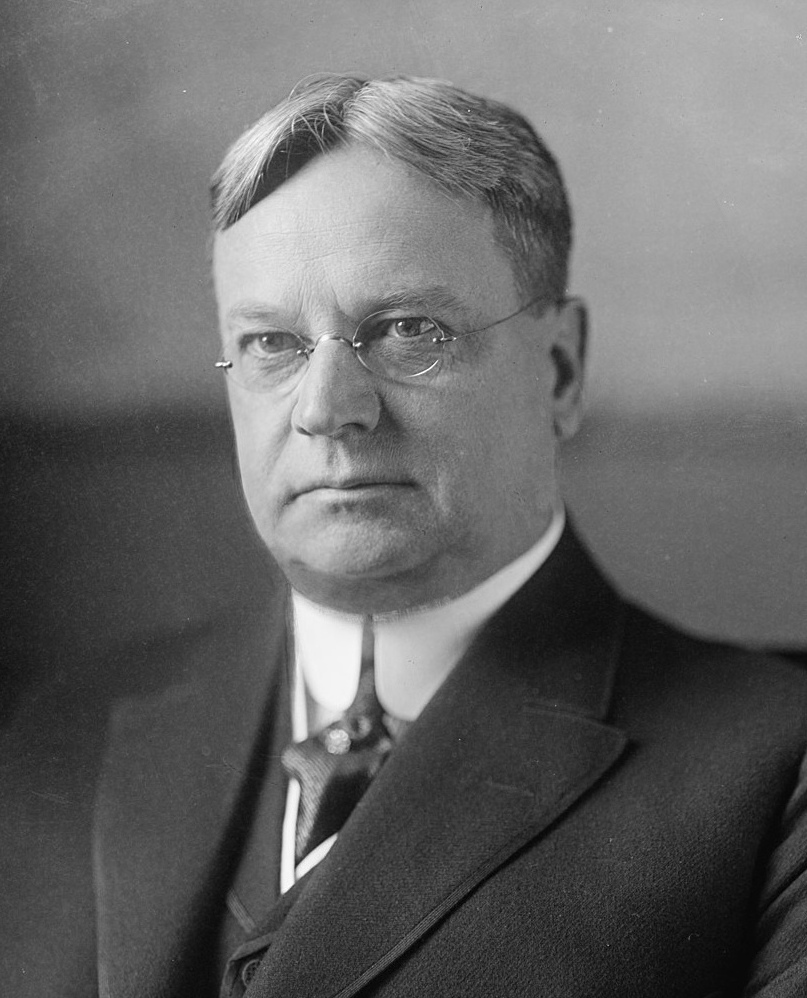

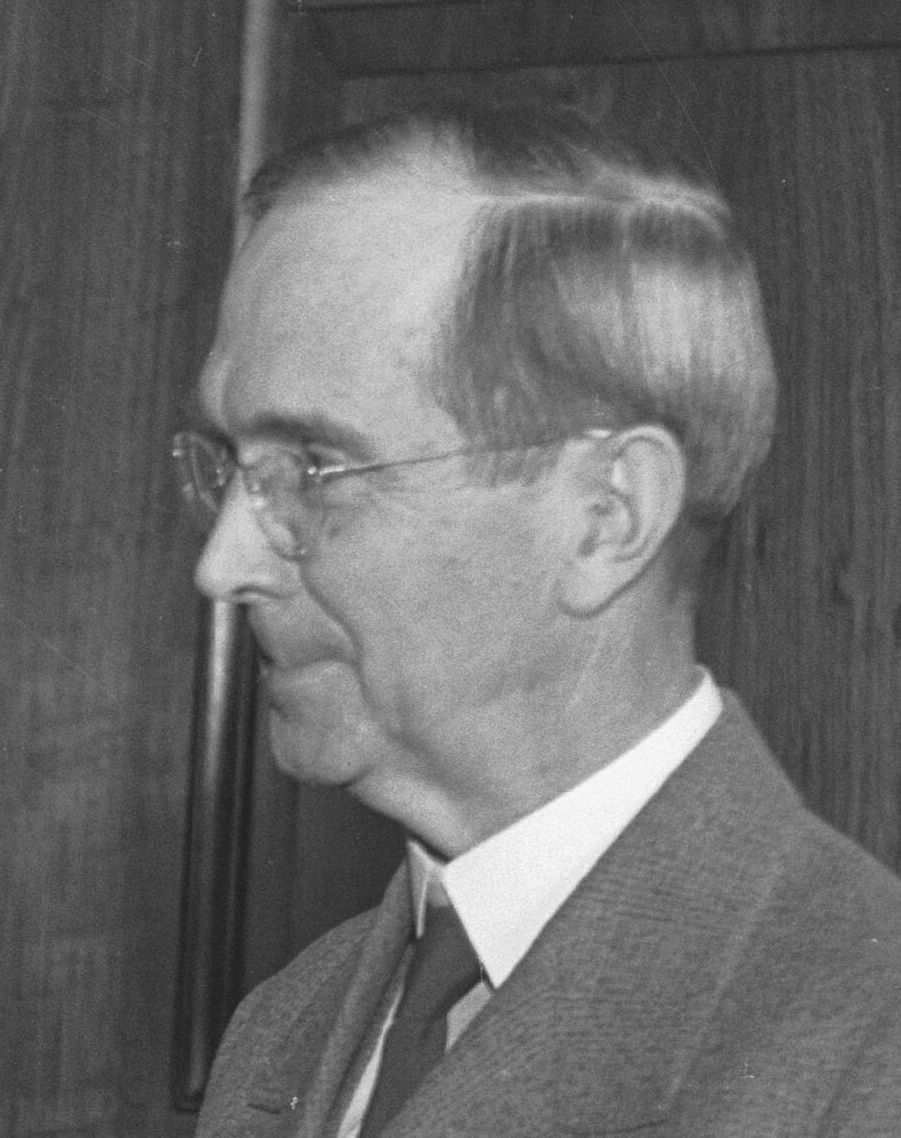

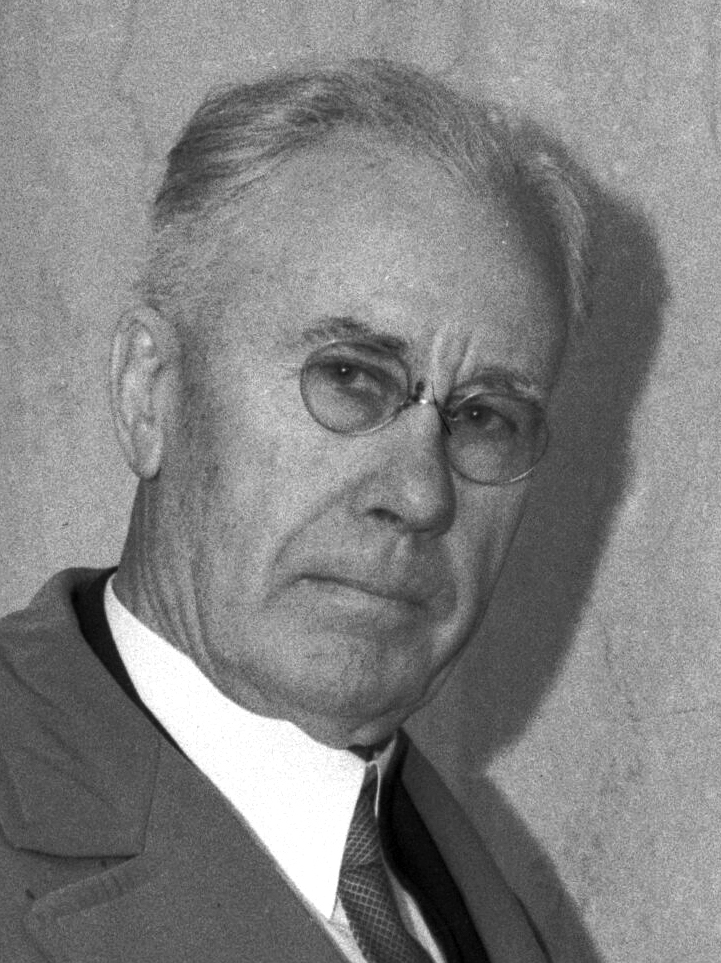
Nominee	Hiram Johnson	Minor Moore	Charles H. Randall
Party	Republican	Democratic	Prohibition
Popular vote	1,148,397	282,411	92,106
Percentage	74.11%	18.23%	5.94%
- County results Johnson: 60–70% 70–80% 80–90% 90–100%
U.S. senator before election
Hiram Johnson
Republican
Elected U.S. Senator
Hiram Johnson
Republican

The 1928 United States Senate election in California was held on November 6, 1928. Incumbent Republican Senator Hiram Johnson was re-elected to his third term in office. He defeated Democrat Minor Moore and Prohibition Party nominee Los Angeles City Councilman Charles H. Randall.

== Primaries ==
Primaries were held on August 28.

=== Republican primary ===
==== Candidates ====
- Hiram Johnson, incumbent Senator
- Charles H. Randall, Los Angeles City Councilman (cross-filing)

==== Results ====
Primary election results
Party	Candidate	Votes	%
Republican	Hiram Johnson (incumbent)	420,219	81.93%
Prohibition	Charles H. Randall (cross-filing)	92,710	18.08%
Total votes		512,929	100.00%

=== Democratic primary ===
==== Candidates ====
- Minor Moore, Judge of the California Court of Appeals

==== Results ====
Judge Minor Moore was unopposed on the ballot, but some primary voters wrote in Hiram Johnson or Charles Randall.

Primary election results
Party	Candidate	Votes	%
Democratic	Minor Moore	94,194	96.67%
Republican	Hiram W. Johnson (incumbent) (write-in)	2,657	2.73%
Prohibition	Charles H. Randall (write-in)	591	0.61%
Total votes		97,442	100.00%

=== Prohibition primary ===
==== Candidates ====
- Wiley J. Phillips
- Charles H. Randall, Los Angeles City Councilman

==== Results ====
Primary election results
Party	Candidate	Votes	%
Prohibition	Charles H. Randall	3,587	52.03%
Prohibition	Wiley J. Phillips	3,307	47.97%
Total votes		97,442	100.00%

== Third parties and independents ==
=== Socialist ===
- Lena Morrow Lewis, nominee for Lt. Governor in 1926

== General election ==
=== Results ===
1928 United States Senate election in California
Party	Candidate	Votes	%	±%
Republican	Hiram Johnson (incumbent)	1,148,397	74.11%	▲11.94
Democratic	Minor Moore	282,411	18.23%	▼5.53
Prohibition	Charles H. Randall	92,106	5.94%	▼1.85
Socialist	Lena Morrow Lewis	26,624	1.72%	▼4.56
Total votes		1,549,538	100.00%	

== See also ==
- 1928 United States Senate elections
