= William Kettner =

American politician (1864–1930)

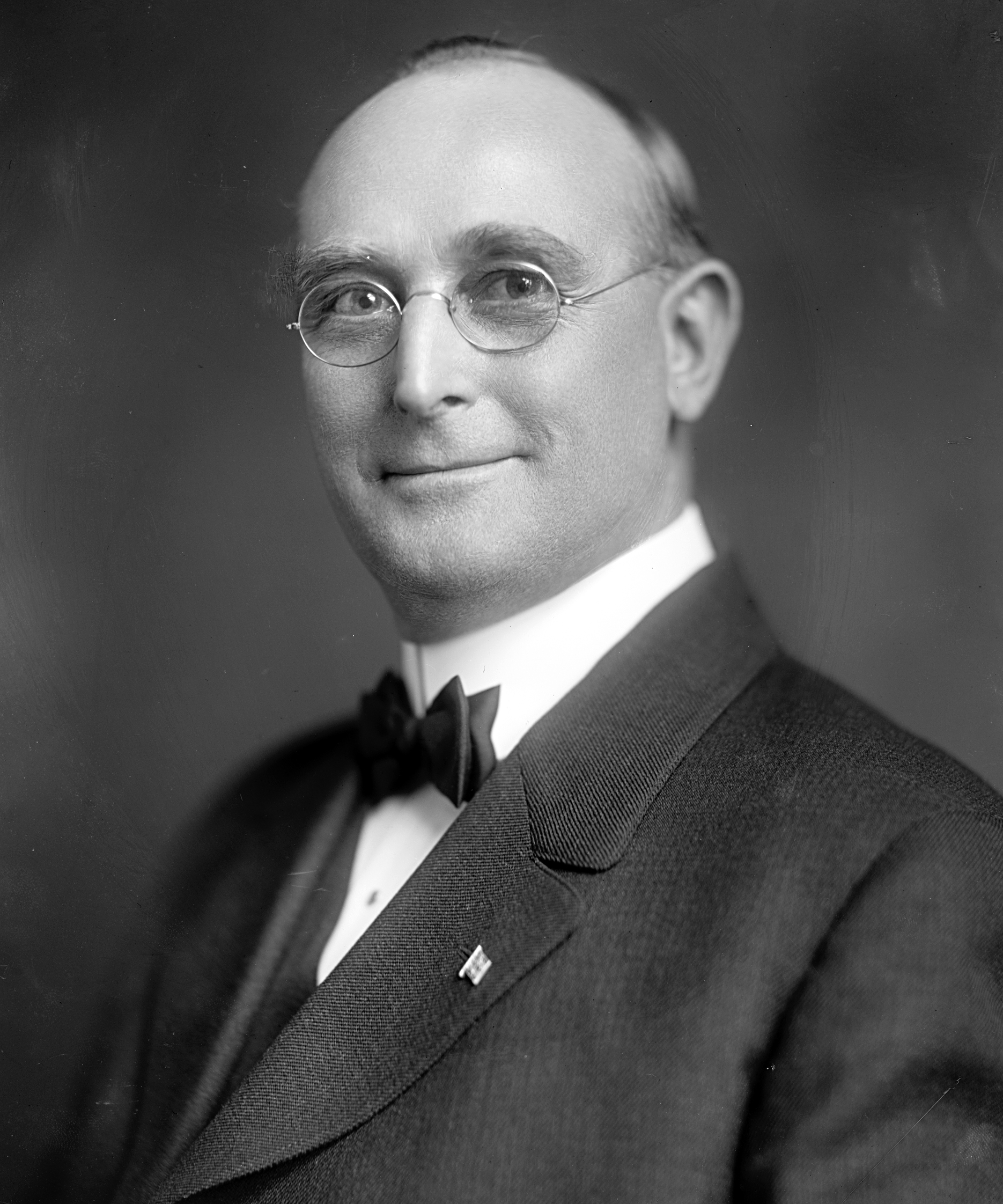

Member of the U.S. House of Representatives from California's 11th district
- In office March 4, 1913 – March 3, 1921
- Preceded by: District created
- Succeeded by: Phil Swing

Personal details
- Born: November 20, 1864 Ann Arbor, Michigan, U.S.
- Died: November 11, 1930 (aged 65) San Diego, California, U.S.
- Resting place: Greenwood Memorial Park
- Party: Democratic

William Kettner (November 20, 1864 – November 11, 1930) was an American Democratic politician from San Diego, California. He served four terms in Congress from 1913 through 1921 and is credited with bringing many U.S. Navy facilities to San Diego.

== Biography ==
Kettner was born in 1864 in Ann Arbor, Michigan, to John F. and Frederika Kettner, both German immigrants. His parents moved to St. Paul, Minnesota, in 1873. His father died when he was 13, so he had to leave school to work, first as a bell boy, then he drove a dray horse. He came to San Diego when he was 21, in the middle of an economic boom in the late 1880s, and worked various odd jobs around the state.

=== Family ===
In 1893, he married Ida B. Griffs in Visalia, California, and went into the real estate and insurance business there. The couple divorced in 1904.

Kettner married Marion Morgan in 1905, and they lived in Visalia until moving to San Diego in 1907. William Kettner set up an insurance business, and later became involved with real estate and banking. The next year the city was visited by the U.S. Navy's Great White Fleet - its first U.S. stop on a round-the-world cruise. Kettner was inspired by the visit and volunteered to organize the city's reception festivities for the fleet. He then became a member of the board of the San Diego Chamber of Commerce, and served as its director.

=== Tenure in Congress ===
Kettner was first elected to the House of Representatives in 1912. Although he was a Democrat and Republicans had traditionally represented the district, he was supported by many Republicans, including the conservative San Diego Union, because of his popularity with the Chamber of Commerce and the turmoil in the national Republican party caused by Theodore Roosevelt's split of the party into "stand-patters" and Progressives. Republicans used the slogan "Why not Kettner?" Kettner won by 3,500 votes. He was re-elected in 1914 by 24,000 votes; in 1916 by 9,000 votes; and in 1918 when he ran unopposed.

During his four terms in Congress, 1913–1921, he spent much effort bringing naval bases to San Diego. His first accomplishment, achieved by lobbying even before he was sworn in as a member of Congress, was a federal appropriation to dredge San Diego Bay to allow large ships to enter. He continued to promote San Diego and Southern California interests (the Congressional district then encompassed ten counties) throughout his tenure.

Kettner won friends easily with his warm personality and addressed colleagues as "brother", earning him the nickname of "Brother Bill" in San Diego and Washington D.C. He courted many congressmen and officials, lobbying them over dinner and gifting them with California produce such as oranges and wine. He became friends with Franklin D. Roosevelt, then Assistant Secretary of the Navy. Roosevelt visited San Diego during the 1915 Panama–California Exposition and came away impressed with the area's potential as a Navy base. He helped Kettner's efforts to establish bases in San Diego as assistant naval secretary and later as the president of the United States.

He stepped down as congressman in 1920 due to poor health and a financial downturn with his insurance business.

By the time Kettner retired from Congress in 1921, he had secured many naval bases, including Camp Kearny on the site which is now Marine Corps Air Station Miramar as well as Naval Base San Diego, Naval Medical Center San Diego, Naval Training Center San Diego, and Naval Air Station North Island, and the Broadway Naval Supply Depot. The military later became for a time the largest employer in San Diego County. Kettner was nicknamed the "Million Dollar Congressman" for his ability to gain naval bases in San Diego.

== Death and burial ==
Kettner died in San Diego in 1930 and is buried at Greenwood Memorial Park, beside his mother, who died in 1912.

== Legacy ==
In 1919 the fireboat Bill Kettner, in use until 1961, was named in his honor. In 1930, San Diego's Arctic Street was renamed Kettner Boulevard to honor him.

== Electoral history ==
1912 United States House of Representatives elections in California
Party	Candidate	Votes	%
Democratic	William Kettner	24,822	42.7
Republican	Samuel C. Evans	21,426	36.8
Socialist	Noble A. Richardson	7,059	12.1
Prohibition	Helen M. Stoddard	4,842	8.3
Total votes		46,248	100.0
Turnout			
Democratic gain from Republican			

1914 United States House of Representatives elections in California
Party	Candidate	Votes	%
Democratic	William Kettner (Incumbent)	47,165	52.7
Republican	James Carson Needham	25,001	27.9
Prohibition	James S. Edwards	11,278	12.7
Socialist	Casper Bauer	6,033	6.7
Total votes		89,477	100.0
Turnout			
Democratic hold			

1916 United States House of Representatives elections in California
Party	Candidate	Votes	%
Democratic	William Kettner (Incumbent)	42,051	44.5
Republican	Robert C. Harbison	33,765	35.7
Prohibition	James S. Edwards	14,759	15.6
Socialist	Marcus W. Robbins	3,913	4.1
Total votes		94,488	100.0
Turnout			
Democratic hold			

1918 United States House of Representatives elections in California
Party	Candidate	Votes	%
Democratic	William Kettner (Incumbent)	45,915	72.2
Prohibition	Stella B. Irvine	17,642	27.8
Total votes		63,557	100.0
Turnout			
Democratic hold			

== Quote ==
I firmly believe that most people have a longing to do something for their fellowman, in order that it may be said when they have passed on that their lives have not been spent in vain.

— William Kettner, Why it was Done, p. 183

== Other references ==
- Kettner, William (1923). Why It Was Done and How.. Compiled by Mary B. Steyle. Kettner's Congressional autobiography, with his portrait.
- Black, Samuel T. (1913). San Diego County California. The S. J. Clark Publishing Company, Chicago., v. 2, pp. 104–105: "William Kettner"
- Heilbron, Carl (1936). History of San Diego County. San Diego Press Club. Biography, pp. 106–108
- Biography (San Diego Historical Society)
- United States Congress. "William Kettner (id: K000155)". Biographical Directory of the United States Congress.
- "William Kettner: San Diego's Dynamic Congressman", The Journal of San Diego History 25:3 (Summer 1979) by Lucille C. DuVall

U.S. House of Representatives
New district	Member of the U.S. House of Representatives from California's 11th congressional district 1913–1921	Succeeded by Phil Swing
