= John I. Nolan =

American politician

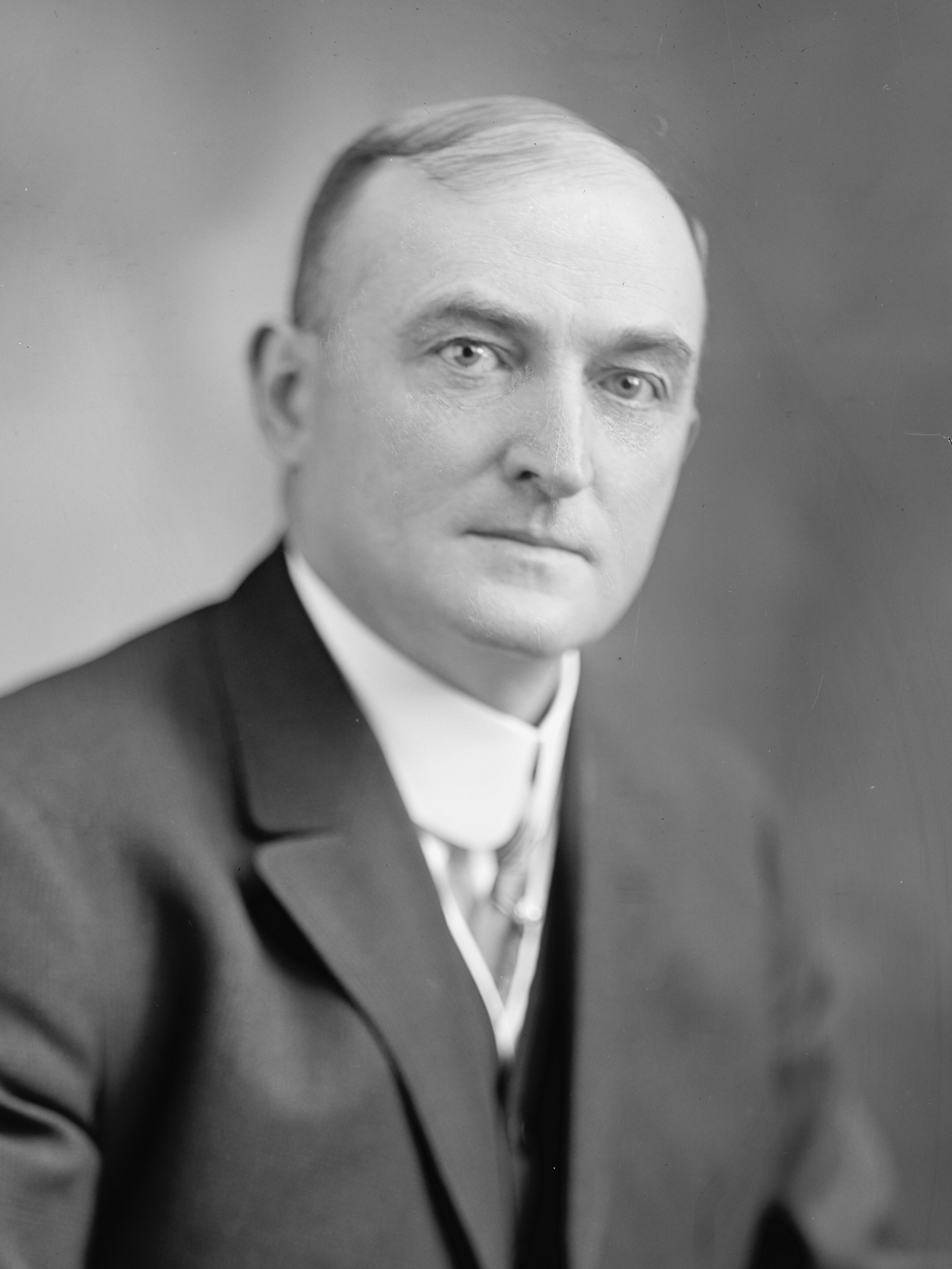
- Portrait c. 1913–1915

Member of the U.S. House of Representatives from California's 5th district
- In office March 4, 1913 – November 18, 1922
- Preceded by: Everis A. Hayes
- Succeeded by: Mae E. Nolan

Member of the San Francisco Board of Supervisors
- In office March 6, 1911 – January 8, 1912
- Appointed by: P. H. McCarthy
- Preceded by: John P. McLaughlin

Personal details
- Born: John Ignatius Nolan; January 14, 1874 San Francisco, California, U.S.
- Died: November 18, 1922 (aged 48) San Francisco, California, U.S.
- Resting place: Holy Cross Cemetery
- Party: Republican; Progressive; Union Labor
- Spouse: Mae Ella Hunt (m. 1913)
- Children: Corliss

John Ignatius Nolan (January 14, 1874 – November 18, 1922) was an American iron molder and politician who represented California's 5th congressional district in the United States House of Representatives for five terms from 1913 to 1922. He was elected to a sixth consecutive term but died before the start of the new Congress.

== Background ==
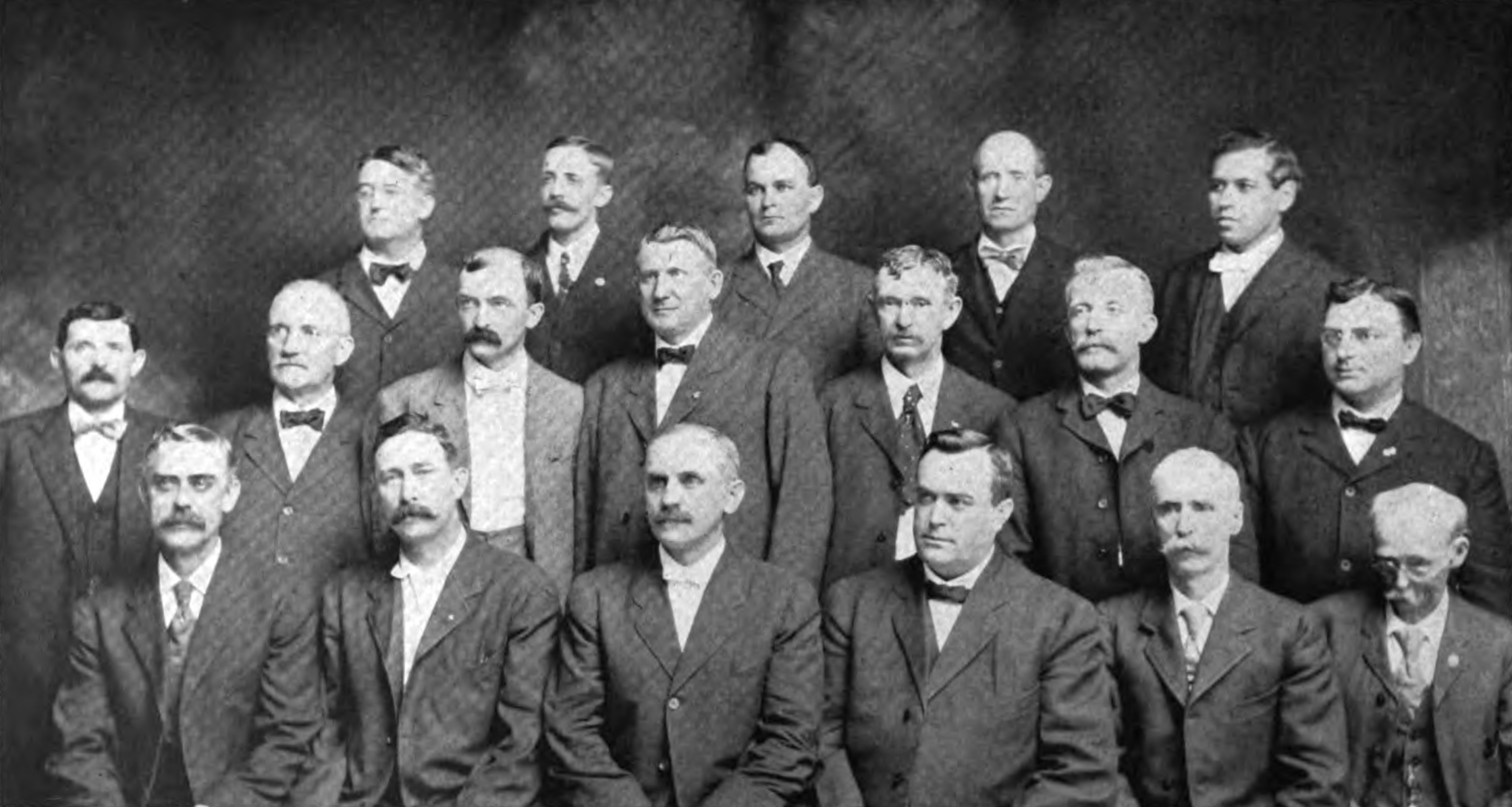
National Officers of the International Iron Molders' Union of North America, 1907. Nolan stands in the middle row, third from left.

Nolan was born in San Francisco, California, on January 14, 1874. He attended the public schools there until the age of 14, when he became an apprentice iron molder. He worked in that trade until 1907, when he was elected secretary of the San Francisco Iron Molder's Union. Later that year, he was elected to the international union's executive board. He was the San Francisco Labor Council's legislative agent to the California Legislature from 1909 to 1911.

An active member of the Union Labor Party, Nolan was appointed to the San Francisco Board of Supervisors by mayor P. H. McCarthy in 1911. He was a member of the Board's Finance Committee and chairman of its Street Committee. He ran for re-election that year, but was narrowly defeated. In 1912, he was elected secretary of the San Francisco Labor Council.

== Congress ==
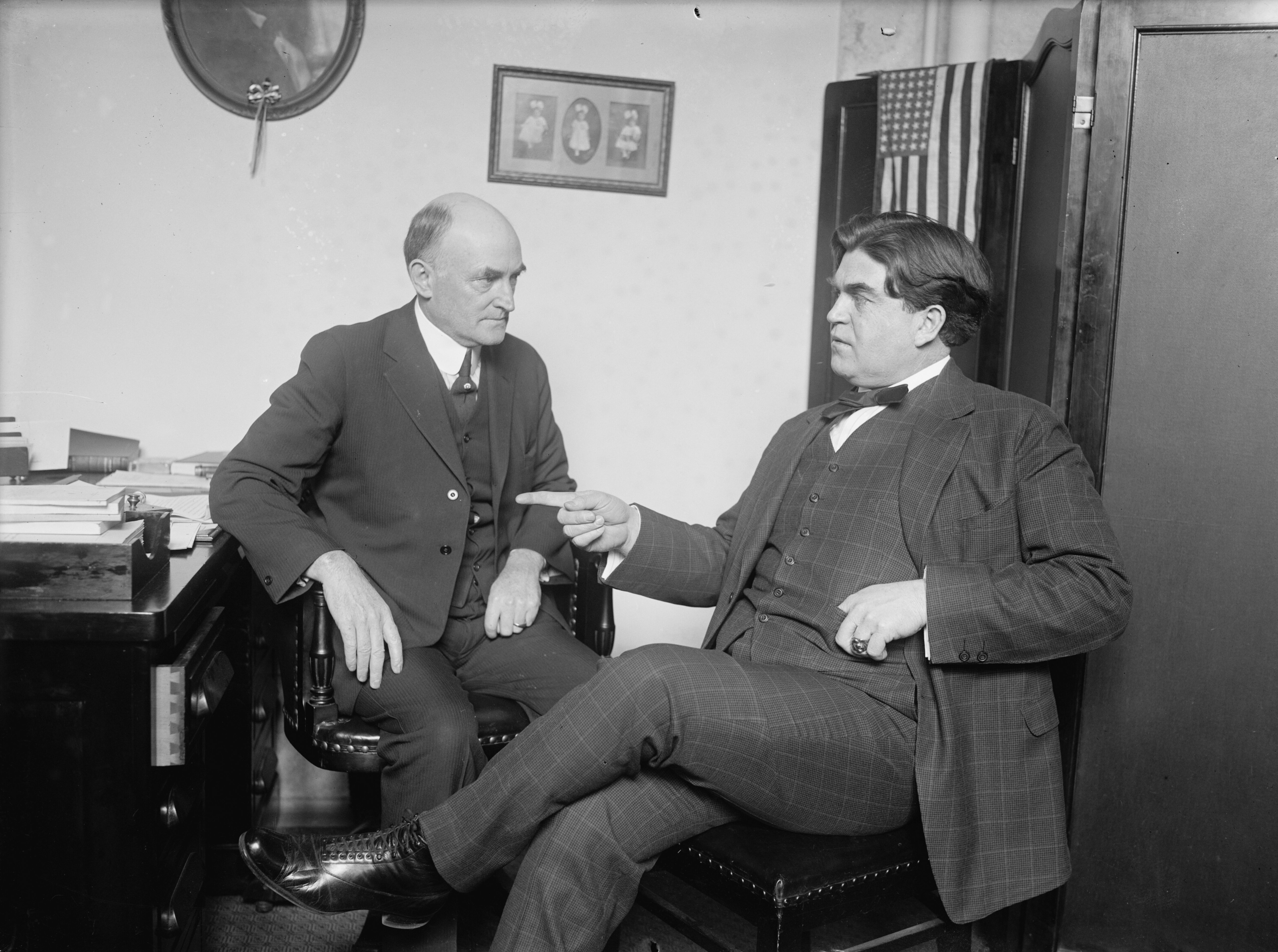
Nolan speaks with United Mine Workers of America president John L. Lewis, 1922

In 1912, Nolan was elected as a Bull Moose Republican to the 63rd United States Congress. San Francisco's first labor congressman in eight years, he was a staunch progressive reelected to the four succeeding Congresses. He served from March 4, 1913, until his death. During the 66th United States Congress, he was the chairman of the United States House Committee on Patents, and during the 67th United States Congress, he was the chairman of the United States House Committee on Labor.

Nolan voted for the Immigration Act of 1917 (which barred immigration from most of the Asia–Pacific region), and against the Dyer Anti-Lynching Bill of 1922. Although he initially opposed American entry into World War I, Nolan ultimately voted to declare war on the German Empire and after the war strongly supported American membership in the League of Nations. He voted against the Volstead Act, which established Prohibition in the United States. In 1920, he received a 100% "labor record" from the American Federation of Labor.

In 1916, Nolan introduced H.R. 7625, which would have established a $3 per day minimum wage for federal employees. It was endorsed by the AFL and the National Federation of Federal Employees, but the bill's opponents in the House kept it from coming to a vote. In 1918, U.S. Senator Hiram Johnson co-sponsored the legislation, and it became known as the Johnson-Nolan Minimum Wage Bill. It passed the House that September, but was stalled in the Senate Committee on Education and Labor. It was reintroduced two years later and passed in both the House and Senate, but when it went to conference it was filibustered by Southern Democrats who opposed it because it would have paid African American employees the same as white employees.

== Death and burial ==
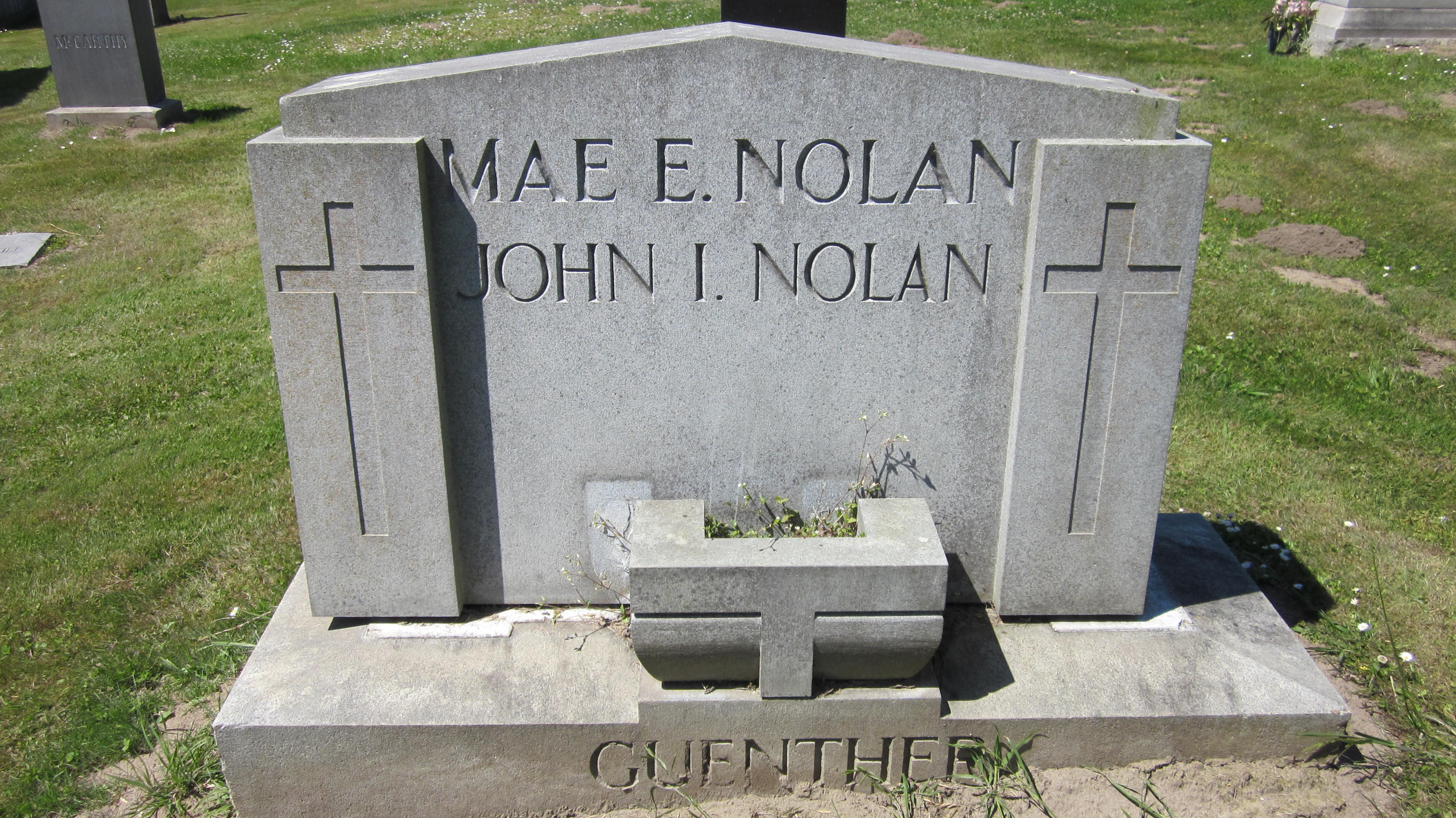
The Nolans' grave at Holy Cross Cemetery

Nolan was re-elected in 1922 to the 68th United States Congress before he died in San Francisco, California, on November 18, 1922. He was interred at Holy Cross Cemetery in Colma, California.

After he died, he was succeeded in Congress by his wife, Mae Nolan. She was the first woman elected to her husband's seat in Congress, which is sometimes known as "widow's succession."

== Electoral history ==
1912 United States House of Representatives elections in California
Party	Candidate	Votes	%
Republican	John I. Nolan	27,902	52.3
Democratic	Stephen V. Costello	18,516	34.7
Socialist	E. L. Requin	6,962	13.0
Total votes		53,380	100.0
Turnout			
Republican win (new seat)			

1914 United States House of Representatives elections in California
Party	Candidate	Votes	%
Republican	John I. Nolan (Incumbent)	53,875	83.3
Socialist	Mads Peter Christensen	7,366	11.4
Prohibition	Frederick Head	3,410	5.3
Total votes		64,651	100.0
Turnout			
Republican hold			

1916 United States House of Representatives elections in California
Party	Candidate	Votes	%
Republican	John I. Nolan (Incumbent)	59,333	84.7
Socialist	Charles A. Preston	6,708	9.6
Prohibition	Frederick Head	4,046	5.8
Total votes		70,087	100.0
Turnout			
Republican hold			

1918 United States House of Representatives elections in California
Party	Candidate	Votes	%
Republican	John I. Nolan (Incumbent)	40,375	87
Socialist	Thomas F. Feeley	6,032	13
Total votes		46,407	100.0
Turnout			
Republican hold			

1920 United States House of Representatives elections in California
Party	Candidate	Votes	%
Republican	John I. Nolan (Incumbent)	50,274	81.8
Socialist	Hugo Ernst	10,952	18.2
Total votes		61,226	100.0
Turnout			
Republican hold			

1922 United States House of Representatives elections in California
Party	Candidate	Votes	%
Republican	John I. Nolan (Incumbent)	49,414	100.0
Turnout			
Republican hold			

== See also ==
- List of members of the United States Congress who died in office (1900–1949)

U.S. House of Representatives
Preceded by Everis A. Hayes	Member of the U.S. House of Representatives from California's 5th congressional district 1913–1922	Succeeded by Mae E. Nolan
