= John E. Raker =

American politician (1863–1926)

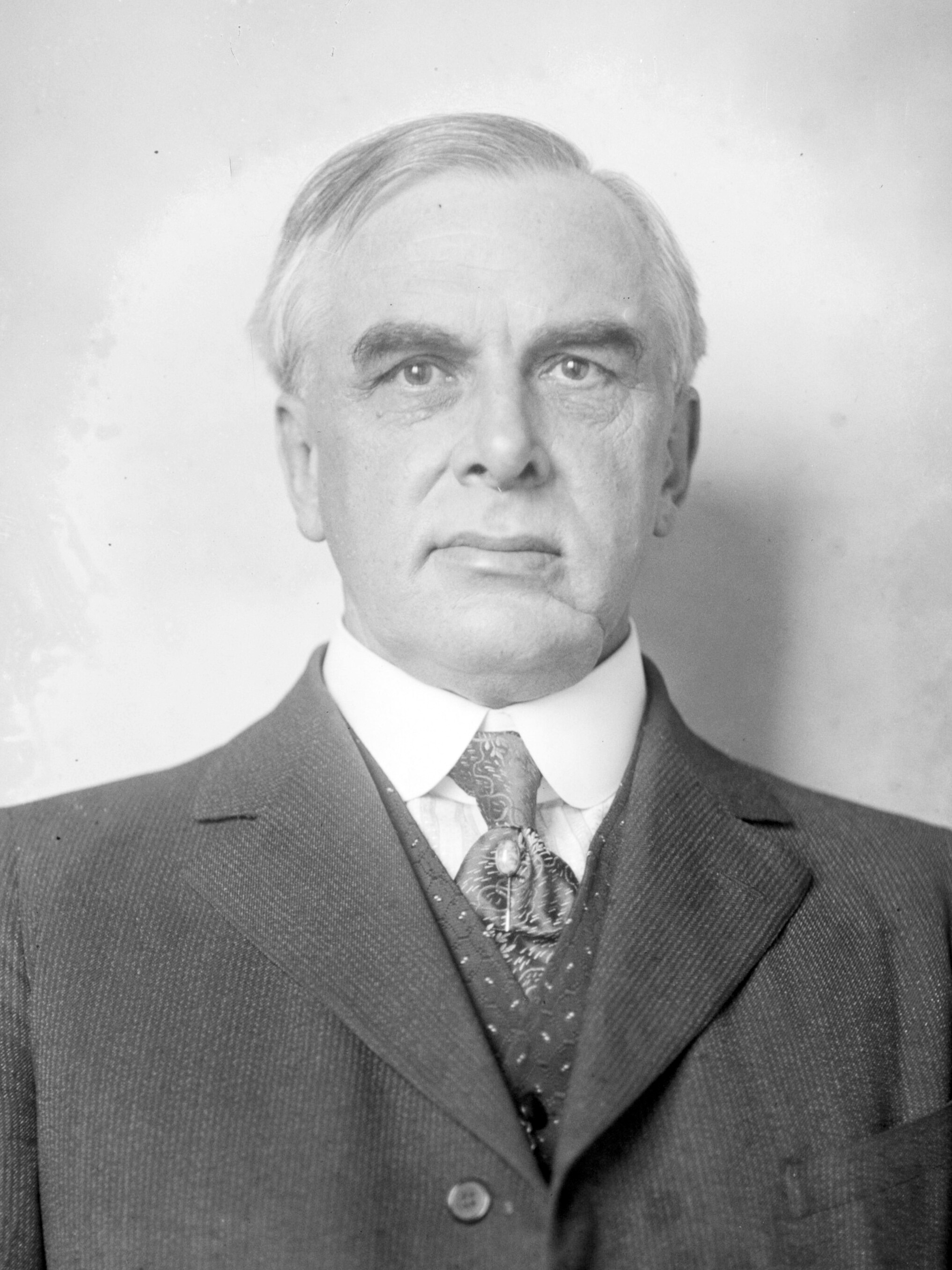
- Raker c. 1918–1921

Member of the U.S. House of Representatives from California
- In office March 4, 1911 – January 22, 1926
- Preceded by: William F. Englebright
- Succeeded by: Harry L. Englebright
- Constituency: 1st district (1911–1913); 2nd district (1913–1926)

Personal details
- Born: John Edward Raker; February 22, 1863 Knox County, Illinois, U.S.
- Died: January 22, 1926 (aged 62) Washington, D.C., U.S.
- Resting place: Susanville Cemetery in Susanville, California
- Party: Democratic
- Occupation: lawyer

John Edward Raker (February 22, 1863 – January 22, 1926) was an American lawyer and politician who served as a Democratic member of the United States House of Representatives from California, serving eight terms from 1911 to 1926.

== Life ==
Raker was born near Knoxville, Knox County, Illinois, on February 22, 1863, and moved with his parents, Christian Raker and Mary E. (née Rambo) Raker, to Lassen County, California, in 1873. After attending public school and the state normal school at San Jose (now San Jose State University) from 1882 to 1884, he studied law. He was admitted to the bar in 1885 and began practicing law in Susanville. In 1886 he moved to Alturas, in Modoc County.

=== Early career ===
Raker was District Attorney of Modoc County from 1895 to 1899, and was an unsuccessful candidate for the California State Senate in 1898. He served as Judge of the Modoc County Superior Court from January 5, 1903, to December 19, 1910, when he resigned, having been elected to Congress. He was chairman of the Democratic State Central Committee from 1908 to 1910, and was a delegate to the Democratic National Convention at Denver in 1908.

=== Congress ===
Elected as a Democrat to the Sixty-second Congress in 1910, and to the seven succeeding Congresses, he served from March 4, 1911, until his death in Washington, D.C., on January 22, 1926. His district was numbered the 1st from 1911 to 1913, and the 2nd from 1913 to 1926.

In 1911, he tried unsuccessfully to introduce legislation for the creation of the Redwood National and State Parks. In stark contrast, he was the main sponsor of what came to be known as the Raker Act, passed in 1913 and signed into law by President Woodrow Wilson in 1914. The Act authorized the damming of the Tuolumne River and the flooding of the Hetch Hetchy Valley, which remain controversial to this day. Still, Raker also introduced the legislation that created Lassen Volcanic National Park in 1916.

In the Sixty-fifth Congress, he chaired the Committee on Expenditures in the Department of Justice and the Committee on Woman Suffrage.

=== Private life ===
Raker married Iva G. Spencer on November 21, 1889. He was a member of the Freemasons and the Odd Fellows.

== Death and burial ==
He is buried at Susanville Cemetery in Susanville, California.

== Electoral history ==
1910 United States House of Representatives elections
| Party | Candidate | Votes | % |
|---|---|---|---|
| Democratic | John E. Raker | 16,704 | 45.4 |
| Republican | William F. Englebright (Incumbent) | 16,570 | 45.1 |
| Socialist | William Morgan | 3,231 | 8.8 |
| Prohibition | C. H. Essex | 259 | 0.7 |
| Total votes | | 37,064 | 100.0 |
| Democratic gain from Republican | | | |

1912 United States House of Representatives elections in California, 2nd district
| Party | Candidate | Votes | % |
|---|---|---|---|
| Democratic | John E. Raker (incumbent) | 23,467 | 62.6 |
| Republican | Frank M. Rutherford | 10,178 | 27.2 |
| Socialist | J. C. Williams | 3,818 | 10.2 |
| Total votes | | 37,463 | 100.0 |
| Turnout | | | |
| Democratic hold | | | |

1914 United States House of Representatives elections in California, 2nd district
| Party | Candidate | Votes | % |
|---|---|---|---|
| Democratic | John E. Raker (incumbent) | 32,575 | 64.7 |
| Republican | James T. Matlock | 15,716 | 31.2 |
| Prohibition | W. P. Fassett | 2,086 | 4.1 |
| Total votes | | 50,377 | 100.0 |
| Turnout | | | |
| Democratic hold | | | |

1916 United States House of Representatives elections in California, 2nd district
| Party | Candidate | Votes | % |
|---|---|---|---|
| Democratic | John E. Raker (incumbent) | 30,042 | 71.0 |
| Republican | Edward H. Hart | 12,282 | 29.0 |
| Total votes | | 42,324 | 100 |
| Turnout | | | |
| Democratic hold | | | |

1918 United States House of Representatives elections in California, 2nd district
| Party | Candidate | Votes | % |
|---|---|---|---|
| Democratic | John E. Raker (incumbent) | 28,249 | 100.0 |
| Turnout | | | |
| Democratic hold | | | |

1920 United States House of Representatives elections in California, 2nd district
| Party | Candidate | Votes | % |
|---|---|---|---|
| Democratic | John E. Raker (incumbent) | 26,172 | 100.0 |
| Turnout | | | |
| Democratic hold | | | |

1922 United States House of Representatives elections in California, 2nd district
| Party | Candidate | Votes | % |
|---|---|---|---|
| Democratic | John E. Raker (incumbent) | 32,981 | 100.0 |
| Turnout | | | |
| Democratic hold | | | |

1924 United States House of Representatives elections in California, 2nd district
| Party | Candidate | Votes | % |
|---|---|---|---|
| Democratic | John E. Raker (incumbent) | 30,590 | 100.0 |
| Turnout | | | |
| Democratic hold | | | |

== See also ==
- List of members of the United States Congress who died in office (1900–1949)

U.S. House of Representatives
| Preceded by William F. Englebright | Member of the U.S. House of Representatives from California's 1st congressional district 1911–1913 | Succeeded by William Kent |
| Preceded by William Kent | Member of the U.S. House of Representatives from California's 2nd congressional district 1913–1926 | Succeeded by Harry L. Englebright |
