= Greenwood Memorial Park (San Diego) =

Cemetery in San Diego County, California

Coordinates: 32°42′21″N 117°06′12″W

Greenwood Memorial Park is a cemetery in San Diego County, California. Opened in 1907, Greenwood covers approximately 125 acres (0.51 km^{2}) five miles east of downtown San Diego. It is a rural cemetery, incorporating architecture, art, and landscaping into its design. Greenwood and its accompanying mortuary are now part of NorthStar Memorial Group (NSMP). It is adjacent to Mount Hope Cemetery.

== Notable interments ==
- Belle Benchley (1882–1973), director of the San Diego Zoo from 1927–1953
- Dan Broderick, attorney, and his wife Linda, murdered by his ex-wife, Betty Broderick, in 1989
- Victor Buono (1938–1982), character actor (He is entombed with his mother, Myrtle, but his name is not inscribed on the crypt.)
- George Burnham (1868–1939), banker, politician
- Marvel Crosson (1904–1929), pioneer female aviator
- Bob Elliott (1916–1966), Major League Baseball player, 1947 National League MVP
- David Faber (1928–2015), Polish-born Holocaust survivor, author, lecturer
- Walter Fuller (1910–2003), jazz trumpeter and vocalist, civil-rights activist
- Ulysses S. "Buck" Grant, Jr. (1852–1929), son of Ulysses S. Grant, attorney and investment capitalist, developer of the U.S. Grant Hotel
- Ulysses S. Grant IV (1893–1977), grandson of President Ulysses S. Grant and former chairman of the Department of Geology, University of California at Los Angeles
- Burke Hanford (1872–1928), sailor, recipient of the Medal of Honor
- Donal Hord (1902–1966), sculptor
- William "Bill" Kettner (1864–1930), United States Congressman, civic booster
- Jonathan Latimer (1906–1983), American crime writer known his novels and screenplays.
- Moses A. Luce (1842–1933), Civil War veteran, Medal of Honor recipient, attorney, founder of Luce, Forward, Hamilton & Scripps
- Charles Schroeter (1837–1921), Civil War and Apache War veteran, Medal of Honor recipient; re-interred at Miramar National Cemetery in 2015
- Ernestine Schumann-Heink (1861–1936), operatic contralto
- David R. Splaine, (1834-1916), Civil War Veteran, first appointed keeper of Ballast Point Lighthouse
- Phil Swing (1884–1963), United States Congressman
- Gregon A. Williams, Marine Corps Major general; served in Nicaragua, World War II and Korean War
- Harold Bell Wright (1872–1944), best-selling writer

There is one British Commonwealth war grave to a Lieutenant-Commander Surgeon of the Royal Navy of World War I.
