= Charles F. Curry =

American politician (1858–1930)

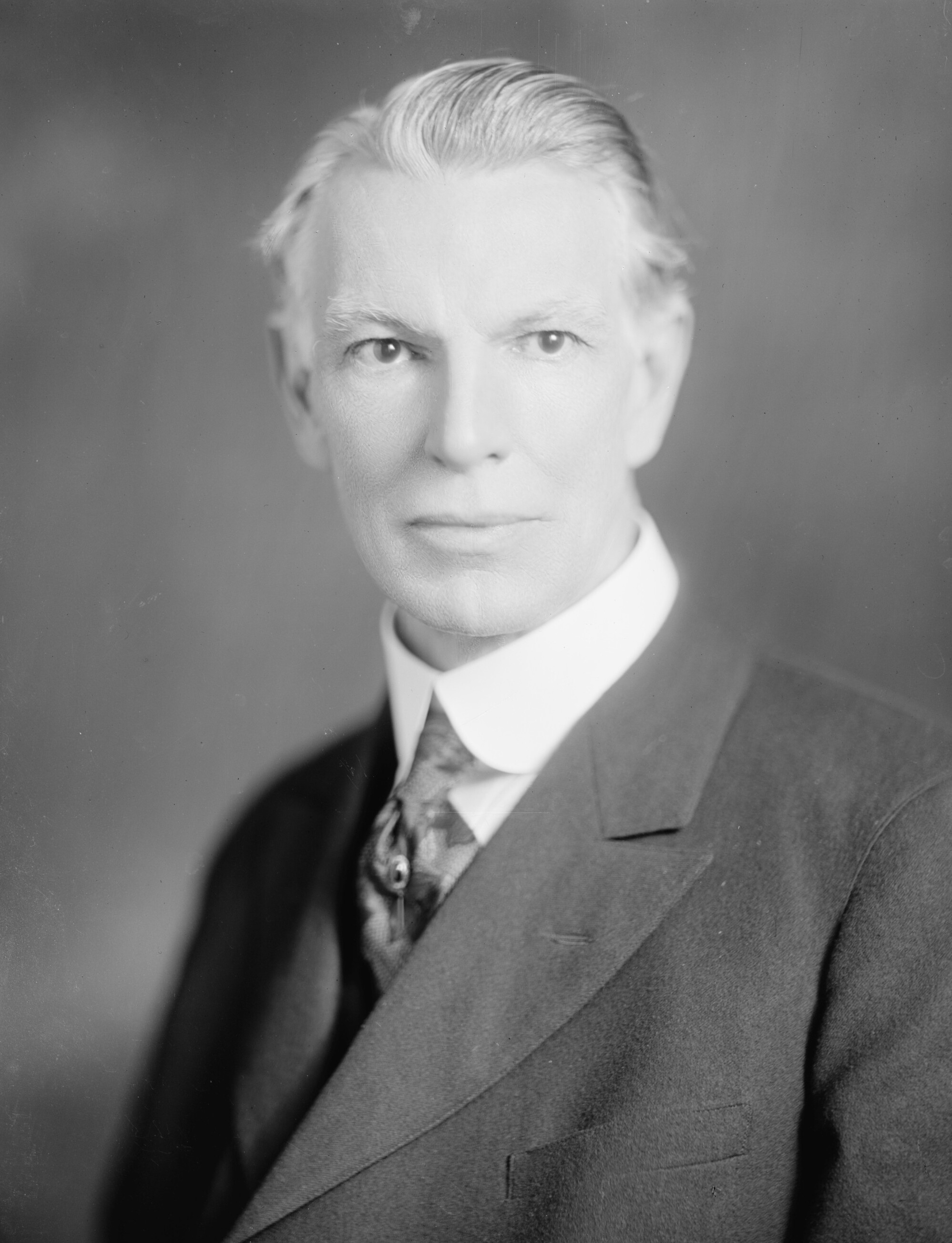
- Curry, 1905–1930

Member of the U.S. House of Representatives from California's 3rd district
- In office March 4, 1913 – October 10, 1930
- Preceded by: Joseph R. Knowland
- Succeeded by: Charles F. Curry, Jr.

19th Secretary of State of California
- In office January 4, 1899 – January 3, 1911
- Governor: Henry Gage; George Pardee; James Gillett
- Preceded by: Lewis H. Brown
- Succeeded by: Frank C. Jordan

Member of the California State Assembly from the 36th district
- In office January 3, 1887 – January 7, 1889

Personal details
- Born: Charles Forrest Curry; March 14, 1858 Naperville, Illinois, U.S.
- Died: October 10, 1930 (aged 72) Washington, D.C., U.S.
- Resting place: Abbey Mausoleum, later moved to National Memorial Park near Falls Church, Virginia
- Party: Republican
- Children: Charles Jr.

Charles Forrest Curry (March 14, 1858 – October 10, 1930) was an American businessman and politician who served nine terms as a U.S. representative from California from 1913 until his death in 1930.

== Early life and education ==
Curry was born in Naperville, Illinois in 1858 and attended the common schools and the Episcopal Academy in Mineral Point, Wisconsin. He studied one year at the University of Washington in Seattle and was also educated by a private tutor. In 1872, he moved with his parents to Seattle and then to San Francisco the following year, settling in the South of Market neighborhood.

== Career ==
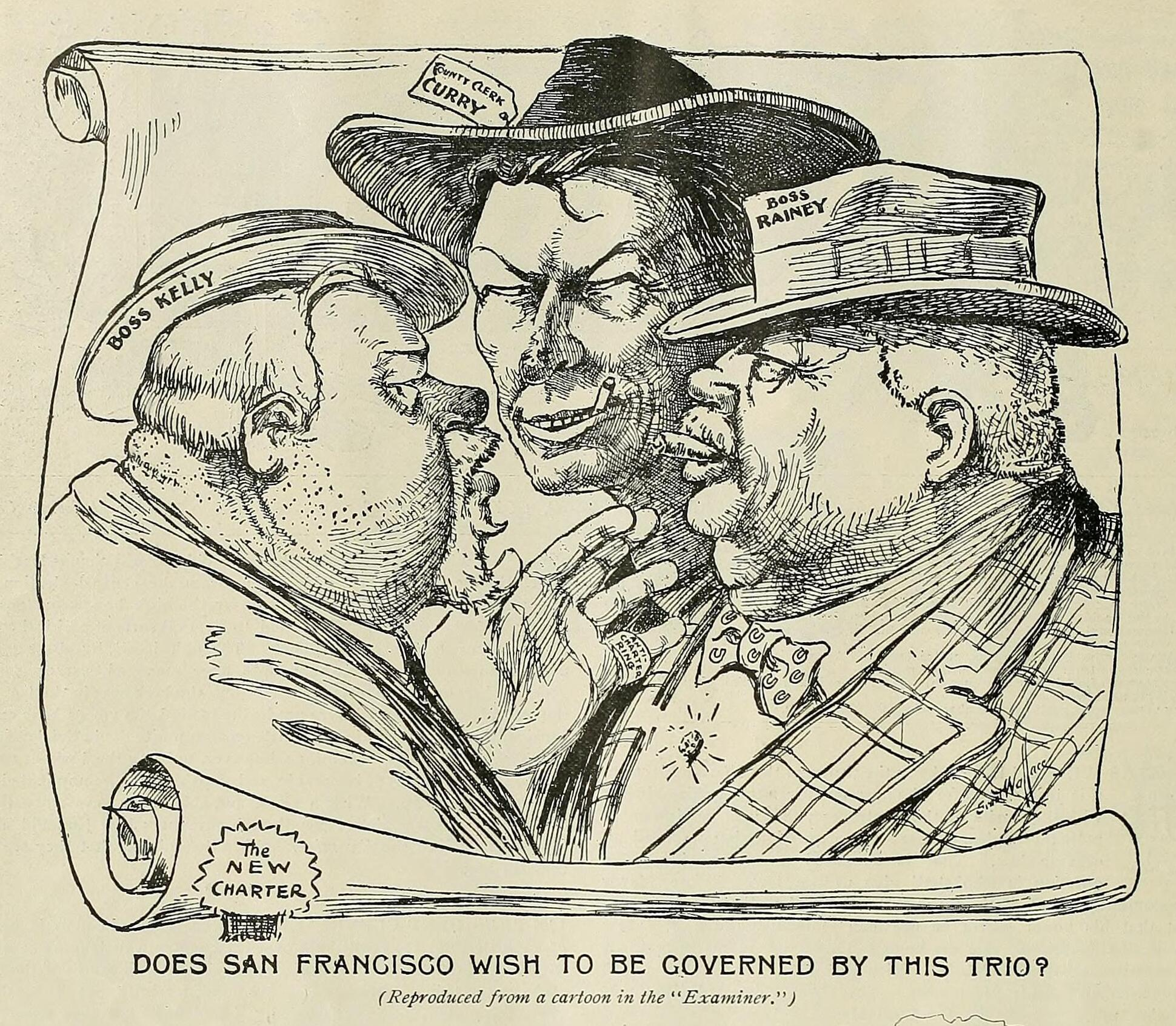
"Does San Francisco Wish To Be Governed By This Trio?" a caricature of Curry (center) with political bosses published in the San Francisco Examiner, October 30, 1897

There, Curry engaged in agricultural pursuits and the cattle, lumber and mining businesses. He served as a member of the State Assembly in 1887 and 1888. He became admitted to the bar of San Francisco in 1888 and was then the superintendent of Station B post office, San Francisco, from 1890 to 1894. After that Curry served as clerk of San Francisco city and county between 1894 and 1898. He was the Secretary of State of California from 1899 to 1910.

He was an unsuccessful candidate for the Republican nomination for governor in 1910. The following year, he was appointed Building and Loan Commissioner of California. In the same year, he served as the representative to the Panama–Pacific International Exposition for the Pacific Coast and Intermountain States.

=== Congress ===
Curry was elected as a Republican to the Sixty-third Congress. He served eight consecutive terms from March 4, 1913, until his death in Washington, D.C., October 10, 1930 at which point his son won his seat as a write-in candidate.

In the 67th Congress, he presented a paper titled "Alien Land Laws and Alien Rights." In it, he wrote "The miscegenation of the white with the yellow race always results in the production of a hybrid mongrel mentally, morally, and physically inferior to either race, inheriting the mental, moral, and physical defects of both parents."

During his tenure as a congressman, he served as chairman of the Committee on Territories (Sixty-sixth through Seventy-first Congresses).

== Personal life and death ==
Curry died in Washington, D.C. on October 10, 1930. After his death, he was interred in Abbey Mausoleum (near Arlington National Cemetery), Arlington, Virginia. He was reinterred in National Memorial Park, Falls Church, Virginia.

Curry was the father of Charles Forrest Curry, Jr.

== Legacy ==
In 1921, Curry had a new elementary school named in his honor in Vallejo, California. Charles F. Curry school was located at 321 Wallace Avenue, and was in operation from 1921 until 1973. The grounds also housed Carol Vista school, a facility for handicapped and special needs students.

== Electoral history ==
Charles Curry electoral history

1912 United States House of Representatives elections in California, District 3
Party	Candidate	Votes	%
Republican	Charles F. Curry	31,060	58.8
Democratic	Gilbert M. Ross	15,197	28.8
Socialist	William L. Wilson	6,522	12.4
Total votes		52,779	100.0
Republican hold			

1914 United States House of Representatives elections in California, District 3
Party	Candidate	Votes	%
Republican	Charles F. Curry (Incumbent)	66,034	85.0
Socialist	David T. Ross	6,752	8.7
Prohibition	Edwin F. Van Vlear	4,911	6.3
Total votes		77,697	100.0
Republican hold			

1916 United States House of Representatives elections in California, District 3
Party	Candidate	Votes	%
Republican	Charles F. Curry (Incumbent)	48,193	66.7
Democratic	O. W. Kennedy	16,900	23.4
Socialist	Ben Cooper	4,455	6.2
Prohibition	Edwin F. Van Vlear	2,694	3.7
Total votes		72,242	100.0
Republican hold			

1918 United States House of Representatives elections in California, District 3
Party	Candidate	Votes	%
Republican	Charles F. Curry (Incumbent)	51,690	91.6
Socialist	Allen K. Gifford	4,746	8.4
Total votes		56,436	100.0
Republican hold			

1920 United States House of Representatives elections in California, District 3
Party	Candidate	Votes	%
Republican	Charles F. Curry (Incumbent)	54,984	74.7
Democratic	J. W. Struckenbruck	14,964	20.4
Socialist	Miles William Beck	3,631	4.9
Total votes		73,579	100.0
Republican hold			

1922 United States House of Representatives elections in California, District 3
Party	Candidate	Votes	%
Republican	Charles F. Curry (Incumbent)	71,316	91.6
Socialist	Marcus H. Steely	6,561	8.4
Total votes		77,877	100.0
Republican hold			

1924 United States House of Representatives elections in California, District 3
Party	Candidate	Votes	%
Republican	Charles F. Curry (Incumbent)	61,512	80.7
Socialist	James H. Barkley	14,665	19.3
Total votes		76,177	100.0
Republican hold			

1926 United States House of Representatives elections in California, District 3
Party	Candidate	Votes	%
Republican	Charles F. Curry (Incumbent)	72,912	100.0
Republican hold			

1928 United States House of Representatives elections in California, District 3
Party	Candidate	Votes	%
Republican	Charles F. Curry (Incumbent)	77,750	100.0
Republican hold			

1930 United States House of Representatives elections in California, District 3
Party	Candidate	Votes	%
Republican	Charles F. Curry Jr.	43,336	53.4
Republican	J. M. Inman	26,785	33.0
Democratic	Frank H. Buck	9,172	11.3
Independent	Katherine Braddock	1,753	2.2
Independent	E. M. Turner	49	0.1
Total votes		80,095	100.0
Republican hold			

== See also ==
- List of members of the United States Congress who died in office (1900–1949)

Political offices
Preceded by Lewis H. Brown	Secretary of State of California; 1899–1911	Succeeded by Frank C. Jordan
U.S. House of Representatives
Preceded by Joseph R. Knowland	Member of the U.S. House of Representatives from California's 3rd congressional district 1913–1930	Succeeded by Charles F. Curry, Jr.
