= 1920 United States House of Representatives elections in California =

United States House of Representatives elections in California, 1920
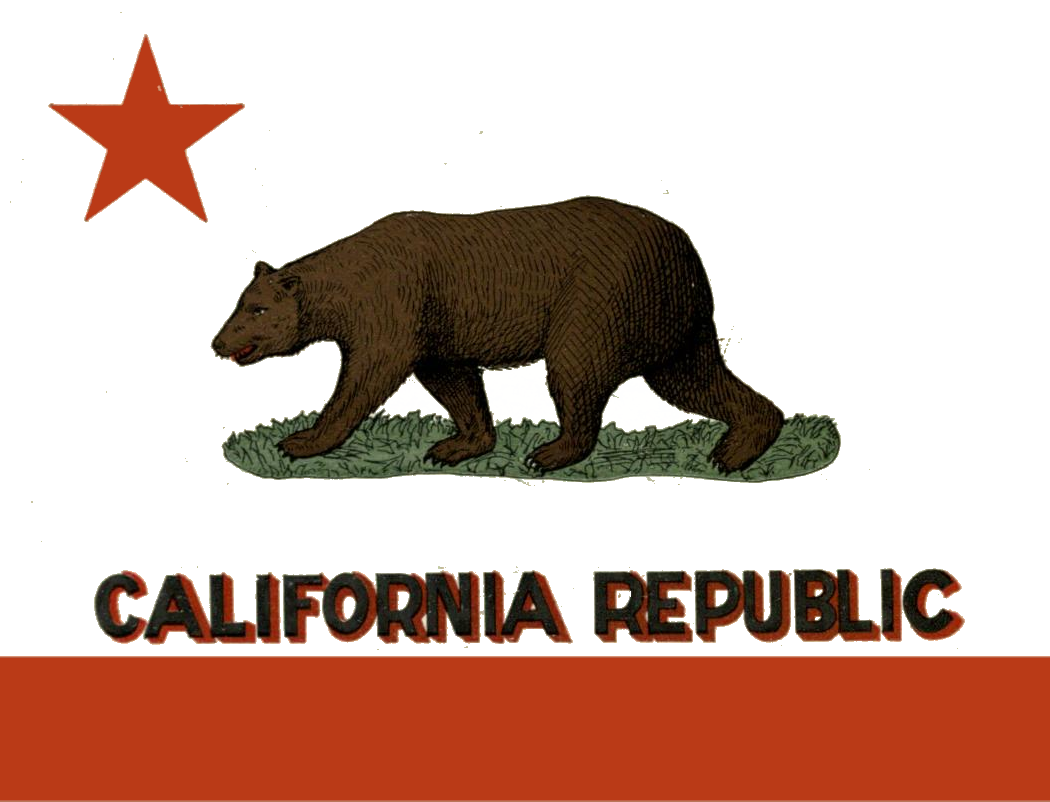
- November 2, 1920

All 11 California seats to the United States House of Representatives
| | Majority party | Minority party | Third party |
|---|---|---|---|
| Party | Republican | Democratic | Prohibition |
| Last election | 6 | 4 | 1 |
| Seats won | 9 | 2 | 0 |
| Seat change | ▲3 | ▼2 | ▼1 |
| Popular vote | 556,025 | 124,018 | 36,675 |
| Percentage | 68.48% | 15.27% | 4.52% |
- Republican hold Republican gain Democratic hold

The United States House of Representatives elections in California, 1920 was an election for California's delegation to the United States House of Representatives, which occurred as part of the general election of the House of Representatives on November 2, 1920. Republicans picked up two Democratic-held districts and defeated the lone Prohibition Party incumbent.

== Overview ==
United States House of Representatives elections in California, 1920
| Party | Votes | Percentage | Seats | +/– |
|---|---|---|---|---|
| Republican | 556,025 | 68.48% | 9 | +3 |
| Democratic | 124,018 | 15.27% | 2 | −2 |
| Socialist | 76,503 | 9.42% | 0 | 0 |
| Prohibition | 36,675 | 4.52% | 0 | −1 |
| Independent | 18,569 | 2.29% | 0 | 0 |
| Scattering | 133 | 0.02% | 0 | 0 |
| Totals | 811,923 | 100.00% | 11 | — |

== Delegation composition ==
| Pre-election | Seats |
| Republican-Held | 6 |
| Democratic-Held | 4 |
| Prohibition-Held | 1 |

| Post-election | Seats |
| Republican-Held | 9 |
| Democratic-Held | 2 |

== Results ==
Final results from the Secretary of State:

=== District 1 ===
California's 1st congressional district election, 1920
| Party | Candidate | Votes | % |
|---|---|---|---|
| Democratic (Note: Lea was also the nominee for the Republican party, having won both the Democratic and Republican primaries.) | Clarence F. Lea (incumbent) | 34,427 | 61.72% |
| Independent | C. A. Bodwell, Jr. | 18,569 | 33.29% |
| Socialist | A. K. Gifford | 2,773 | 4.97% |
| | Scattering | 12 | 0.02% |
| Total votes | | 55,781 | 100.00% |
| Democratic hold | | | |

=== District 2 ===
California's 2nd congressional district election, 1920
| Party | Candidate | Votes | % |
|---|---|---|---|
| Democratic (Note: Raker was also the nominee for the Republican and Socialist parties, having won all three parties' primaries.) | John E. Raker (incumbent) | 26,172 | 99.91% |
| | Scattering | 24 | 0.09% |
| Total votes | | 26,196 | 100.00% |
| Democratic hold | | | |

=== District 3 ===
California's 3rd congressional district election, 1920
| Party | Candidate | Votes | % |
|---|---|---|---|
| Republican | Charles F. Curry (incumbent) | 54,984 | 74.73% |
| Democratic | J. W. Struckenbruck | 14,964 | 20.34% |
| Socialist | Miles William Beck | 3,631 | 4.93% |
| Total votes | | 73,579 | 100.00% |
| Republican hold | | | |

=== District 4 ===
California's 4th congressional district election, 1920
| Party | Candidate | Votes | % |
|---|---|---|---|
| Republican (Note: Kahn was also the nominee for the Democratic party, having won both the Republican and Democratic primaries.) | Julius Kahn (incumbent) | 50,841 | 84.55% |
| Socialist | Hugo Ernst | 9,289 | 15.45% |
| | Scattering | 2 | 0.00% |
| Total votes | | 60,132 | 100.00% |
| Republican hold | | | |

=== District 5 ===
California's 5th congressional district election, 1920
| Party | Candidate | Votes | % |
|---|---|---|---|
| Republican (Note: Nolan was also the nominee for the Democratic party, having won both the Republican and Democratic primaries.) | John I. Nolan (incumbent) | 50,274 | 82.11% |
| Socialist | Hugo Ernst | 10,952 | 17.89% |
| | Scattering | 2 | 0.00% |
| Total votes | | 61,228 | 100.0% |
| Republican hold | | | |

=== District 6 ===
California's 6th congressional district election, 1920
| Party | Candidate | Votes | % |
|---|---|---|---|
| Republican | John A. Elston (incumbent) | 75,610 | 83.31% |
| Socialist | Maynard Shipley | 15,151 | 16.69% |
| Total votes | | 90,761 | 100.00% |
| Republican hold | | | |

=== District 7 ===
California's 7th congressional district election, 1920
| Party | Candidate | Votes | % |
|---|---|---|---|
| Republican (Note: Barbour was also the nominee for the Democratic party, having won both the Republican and Democratic primaries.) | Henry E. Barbour (incumbent) | 57,647 | 87.17% |
| Socialist | Harry M. McKee | 8,449 | 12.78% |
| | Scattering | 34 | 0.05% |
| Total votes | | 66,130 | 100.00% |
| Republican hold | | | |

=== District 8 ===
California's 8th congressional district election, 1920
| Party | Candidate | Votes | % |
|---|---|---|---|
| Republican | Arthur M. Free | 46,823 | 64.01% |
| Democratic (Note: Hersman was also the nominee for the Socialist party, having won both the Democratic and Socialist primaries.) | Hugh S. Hersman (incumbent) | 26,311 | 35.97% |
| | Scattering | 13 | 0.02% |
| Total votes | | 73,147 | 100.00% |
| Turnout | | | |
| Republican gain from Democratic | | | |

=== District 9 ===
California's 9th congressional district election, 1920
| Party | Candidate | Votes | % |
|---|---|---|---|
| Republican | Charles F. Van de Water | 62,952 | 59.70% |
| Prohibition (Note: Randall was also the nominee for the Democratic party, having won both the Prohibition and Democratic primaries.) | Charles H. Randall (incumbent) | 36,675 | 34.78% |
| Socialist | Mary E. Garbutt | 5,819 | 5.52% |
| | Scattering | 6 | 0.01% |
| Total votes | | 105,452 | 100.00% |
| Republican gain from Prohibition | | | |

=== District 10 ===
California's 10th congressional district election, 1920
| Party | Candidate | Votes | % |
|---|---|---|---|
| Republican (Note: Osborne was also the nominee for the Democratic and Prohibition parties, having won both all three parties' primaries) | Henry Z. Osborne (incumbent) | 97,469 | 82.64% |
| Socialist | Upton Sinclair | 20,439 | 17.33% |
| | Scattering | 29 | 0.02% |
| Total votes | | 117,937 | 100.00% |
| Turnout | | | |
| Republican hold | | | |

=== District 11 ===
California's 11th congressional district election, 1920
| Party | Candidate | Votes | % |
|---|---|---|---|
| Republican | Philip D. Swing | 59,425 | 72.84% |
| Democratic | Hugh L. Dickson | 22,144 | 27.14% |
| | Scattering | 11 | 0.01% |
| Total votes | | 81,580 | 100.00% |
| Republican gain from Democratic | | | |

== See also ==
- 67th United States Congress
- Political party strength in California
- Political party strength in U.S. states
- United States House of Representatives elections, 1920
