= Charles Hiram Randall =

American politician (1865–1951)

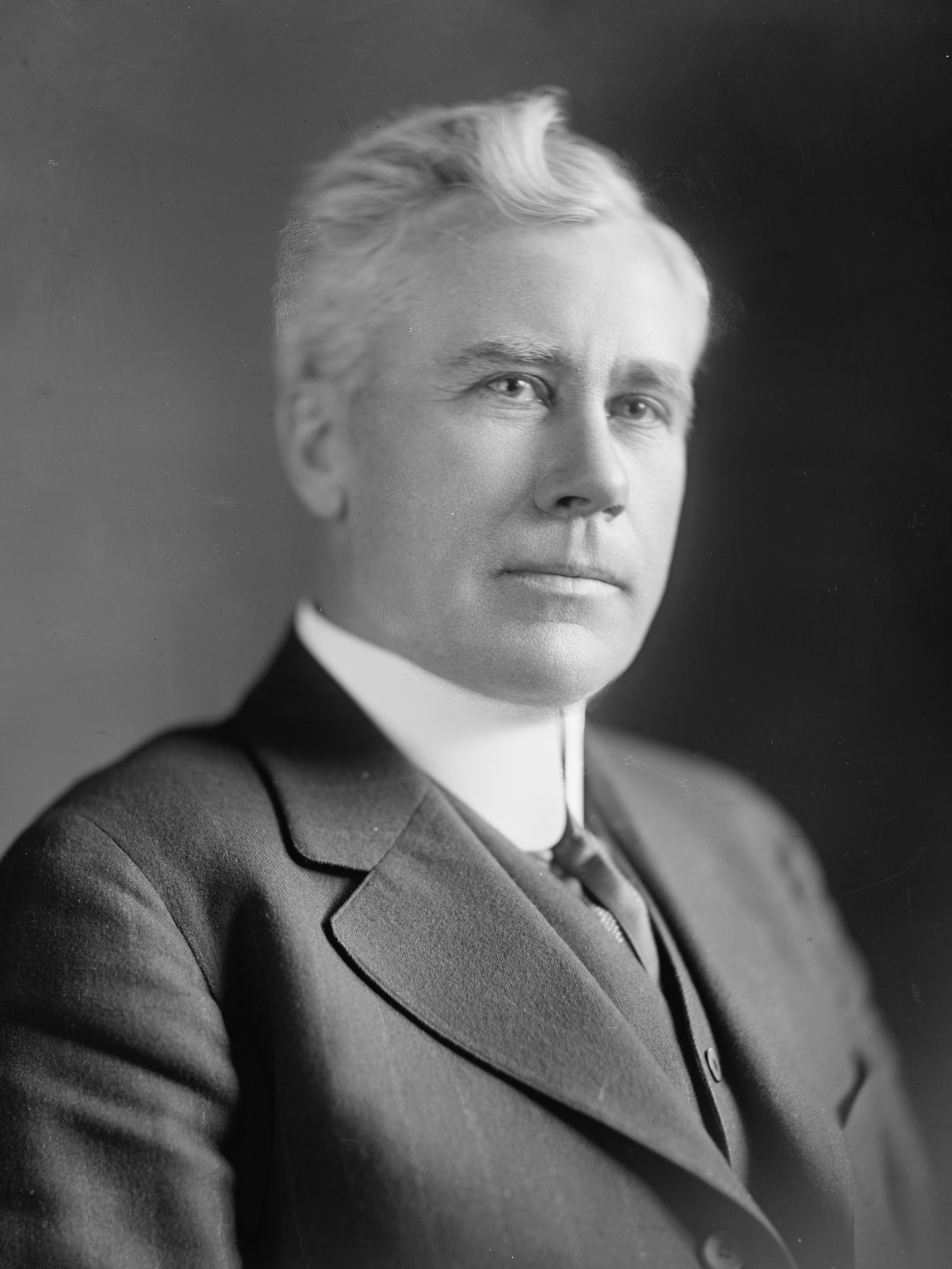
- Randall c. 1908–1919

Member of the U.S. House of Representatives from California's 9th district
- In office March 4, 1915 – March 3, 1921
- Preceded by: Charles W. Bell
- Succeeded by: Walter F. Lineberger

Member of the California State Assembly from the 74th district
- In office January 2, 1911 – January 6, 1913
- Preceded by: William J. Hanlon
- Succeeded by: Frank H. Mouser

President of the Los Angeles City Council
- In office July 1, 1931 – June 30, 1933
- Preceded by: Winfred J. Sanborn
- Succeeded by: Howard W. Davis

Member of the Los Angeles City Council for the 1st district
- In office July 1, 1925 – June 30, 1933
- Preceded by: District established
- Succeeded by: Jim Wilson

Personal details
- Born: July 23, 1865 Auburn, Nebraska, U.S.
- Died: February 18, 1951 (aged 85) Los Angeles, California, U.S.
- Party: Prohibition
- Spouse(s): Ethel May Stanley (1885–1931); Edith B. Leake (1932–1951)
- Children: Clyde Cassels

Charles Hiram Randall (July 23, 1865 – February 18, 1951) was an American newspaper publisher and politician in Los Angeles, California. He represented the city in the California State Assembly from 1911 to 1913 and the U.S. House of Representatives from 1915 to 1921. He was the only Prohibition Party candidate ever elected to Congress. He also served on the Los Angeles City Council from 1925 until 1933 and as President of the City Council for his final term from 1931 to 1933. In 1926, he was the first council member to face a recall election under the present city charter.

== Biography ==
The son of the Rev. Elias J. Randall and Sarah F. Schooley, Randall was born on July 23, 1865, in Auburn, Nebraska, where he was educated in the public schools. He published the Observer beginning in 1885 in Kimball and edited a paper in Harrisburg, both in that state, and various independent weeklies, from 1885 to 1892. He worked as a postal clerk with the United States Railway Service, and in 1904, he moved to California, where he worked for two years for the Santa Fe Railroad and then founded the Highland Park Herald in that Los Angeles district, which he edited until 1915.

He was married first to May E. (or Ethel May) Stanley, in November 1885. They had a daughter, Mrs. Clyde Cassels. His wife died in November 1931, and he and Edith B. Leake then married in November 1932.

His addresses in Los Angeles were 1263 North Mariposa Avenue (near Pico and Normandie) and then 8973 Radford Avenue, North Hollywood. His address in Pasadena was in the Arroyo Seco; he was trapped there in December 1921 with flood waters on both sides before making his way back to Pasadena. He was a Methodist. He died on February 18, 1951.

== Public life ==
=== State and national ===
Randall was a member of the California State Assembly from 1911 to 1912. In 1914, he was elected to the United States Congress as a member of the Prohibition Party. Randall won 28,097 votes (30.9%), Congressman Charles W. Bell won 27,560 votes (30.3%), Republican Frank C. Roberts won 25,176 (27.7%), and Socialist Henry Hart won 10,084 votes (11.09%). Taking advantage of California election laws at the time, Randall was re-elected in 1916 as the nominee of the Prohibition, Democratic, Republican, and Progressive parties defeating Charles W. Bell (running as an independent candidate) by the margin of 58,826 to 33,270 (57.8% to 32.7%) with 9,661 votes for the Socialist Party candidate. On Apr 5, 1917, Randall voted against declaring war on Germany. Randall voted yes to authorize the 18th amendment and enact prohibition. Randall was re-elected by a 38,782 to 31,689 (55% to 45%) margin over a Republican in 1918. Randall voted for the 19th amendment enacting women's suffrage in Congress. Randall was defeated for re-election in 1920 by Charles F. Van de Water, by margin of 62,952 votes (60%) to 36,675 votes.

Randall ran unsuccessfully in 1922 (45,794 votes and 41%), 1924 (67,735 votes and 36% as a candidate of the Prohibition, Socialist, and Democratic parties), 1926 (61,719 votes and 38%), 1934 (18,760 votes and 14% as a Progressive), and 1940 (36,406 votes and 22% as a candidate of the Prohibition and Progressive parties).

In 1924 Randall was for a time the candidate for U.S. vice-president on the Ku Klux Klan-sponsored American Party ticket. He withdrew in August in order to concentrate on a race for Congress in California on both the American and Prohibition party tickets.

He was also an independent candidate for the United States Senate from California in 1928, receiving 5% of the vote. Republican incumbent Hiram Johnson was re-elected overwhelmingly with 71% of the vote and Democrat Minor Moore received 23%.

=== Los Angeles City ===
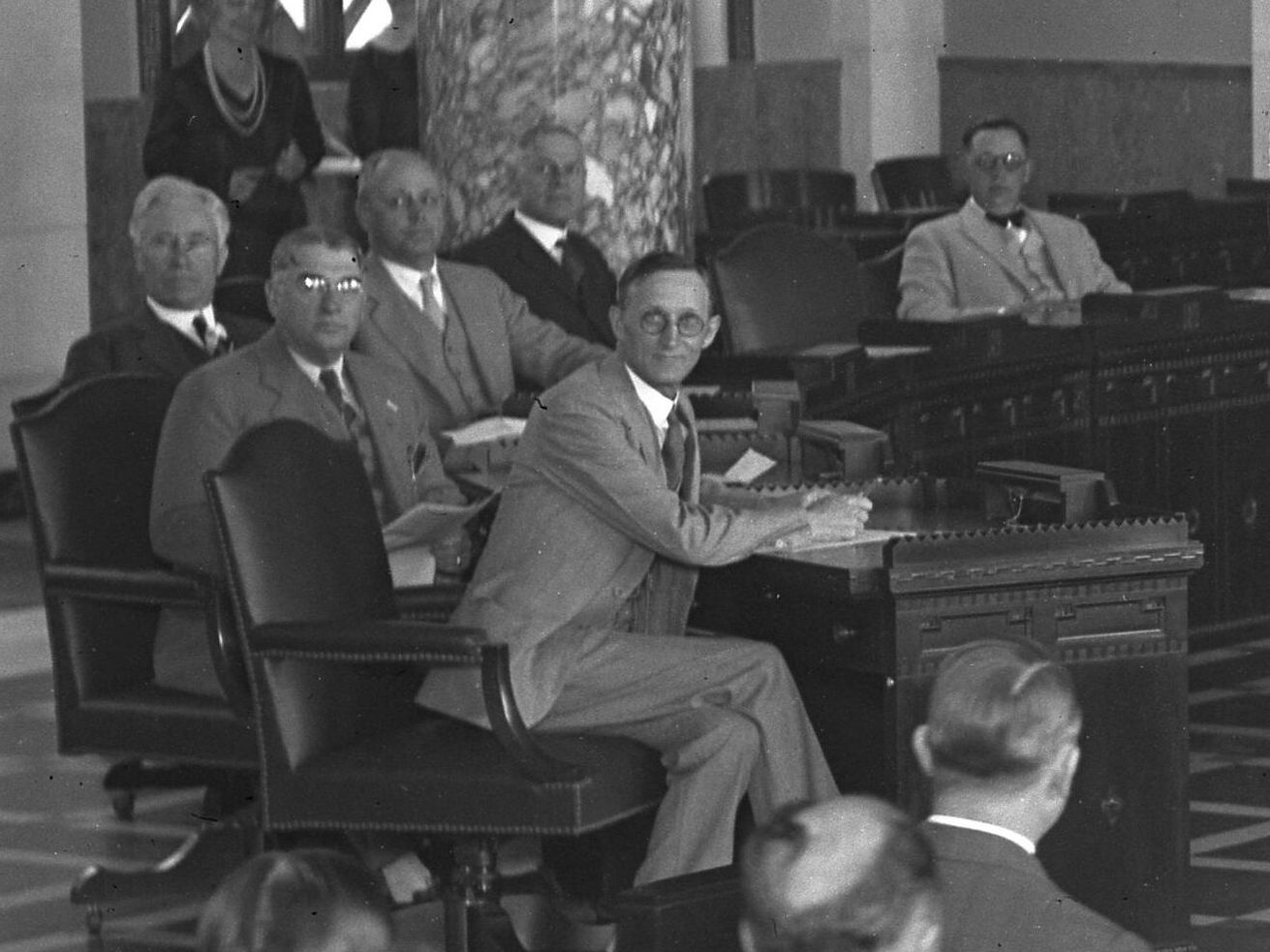
Randall (far left) in the Los Angeles City Council in 1928.

Randall was on the Park Commission 1909–11 and the Planning Commission 1911–12.

Randall was the first person to represent the Los Angeles City Council District 1 under the new city charter of 1925. He served until 1933.

==== Elections ====
1925 Randall ran against four other candidates in the primary election and came in second. The results were: Charles T. Wardlaw, 3,106; Randall, 2,851; Edgar Lampton, 1,593; Arthur M. Fellows, 627; and Clara L. McDonald, 328. Randall was elected in the June final vote, 4,292 votes against Wardlaw's 3,719.

1926 The council member faced a recall election in September, the first in the city under the new charter, but the attempt failed by a vote of 3,901 to 2,595. Names on the ballot to succeed him in case the recall succeeded were John W. Cooke, assistant city engineer stationed in Van Nuys, and Greeley Kolts.

1927 Opposition continued before the May primary election because of Randall's handling of a San Fernando Road improvement district, his reputed delaying of the Glendale-Hyperion Bridge project and his changing of historic street names in the Valley, the main complaint being a change from [General William Tecumseh] Sherman Way to Van Nuys Boulevard. He was elected in the primary, the votes being Randall, 4,691; John E. Lambert, who had the Times endorsement, 2,598; Frank W. Berkshire, 1,676; and Clara L. McDonald, 233.

1929 Candidates in the May primary were Randall; Truitt Hughes, 44, retired lawyer and rancher, the choice of the Times; Charles G. Young, 40, an attorney; William C. McColl, 34, purchasing agent and building engineer; and Estelle C. Holman, former employee of Randall and former member of the City Planning Commission. The primary results were Randall, 4,734; McColl, 2,247; Young, 1,346; Hughes, 1,025, and Holman, 384. In the June final, Randall won over McColl, 8,529 votes to 7,375.

1931 Randall won in the May primary, 5,856 against 3,732 for William C. McColl and 888 for Frank W. Rice.

1933 Randall came in second in the May primary. The results were: Jim Wilson, 4,958; Randall, 4,889; Mark C. Sutton, 3,653; Sterling Martin, 1,661; George C. Audet, 1,074; Ray A. Schafer, 950; George Mozee, 835; and George E. Menner, 728. In the June final, he lost by almost a 2–1 margin, 15,693 votes for Wilson to Randall's 8,375.

=== Council presidency ===
Randall was elected council president on July 1, 1931, by a bare majority, and promptly "declared war in no uncertain terms" upon Mayor Porter, three Water and Power commissioners, the "power trust." the "patent paving trust" and the seven council members who voted against him.

=== Controversies ===
1925 Angry San Fernando Valley residents verbally attacked Randall when he withdrew funds that had been set aside for (1) paving and improvement of Canoga, Devonshire and Chatsworth Streets and (2) building a new road from the Valley through Beverly Glen to the main part of Los Angeles. He said he wanted the adjoining property owners, not the city, to pay for the work.

1926 He was accused by Charles C. Grider, president of the First Councilmanic District Civic League, of failing to keep his campaign promises to (1) immediately construct a 40-mile stretch of Riverside Drive and a "truck speedway," (2) begin construction of a high school in the district, (3) build bridges across the Los Angeles River at Fletcher Avenue, Alessandro Street, Glendale Boulevard and Dayton Street, (4) secure "immediate removal of the Los Feliz Hospital and the dairy at the foot of Alessandro Street," (5) build a school in West Atwater and enlarge the school in East Atwater and (5) widen Glendale Boulevard, Alessandro and Riverside Drive to 100 feet.

1927 Charges were made that Randall used his official position to delay the paving of seven miles of San Fernando Road in order to have the highway graded to the same level as Radford Avenue, on which Randall owned property.

1927 Randall fought against the removal from the new five-member city Planning Commission of his secretary, Estelle C. Holman, who had been appointed by Mayor George Cryer but who was ruled ineligible because she had not been a member of the former 50-member commission under the old city charter.

1928 He was overruled by the council in his desire to install seven miles of ornamental lighting posts on San Fernando Road, a move that was endorsed by the Municipal Art Commission.

1931 Randall at first voted in favor of having the city attorney appeal a judge's decision ordering the city to stop the practice of segregating its swimming pools by race—a practice that had been going on since July 30, 1925. Randall had vigorously opposed the judge's ruling, stating that it was "so sweeping" that the Playground and Recreation Commission "will not be able to designate the days when Boy Scouts can go to the mountain camps. Why, the board can't even set separate days for men and women to bathe." But just the next week, he switched his vote to a new majority decision, favoring integration, which prompted Council Member Evan Lewis—who favored the appeal—to ask the reason. Randall replied that a Negro politician had "conferred" with him and "convinced" him of his error.

== Electoral history ==
Electoral history of Thomas F. Cooke
Year	Office		Party	Primary			General			Result	Swing	Ref.
Year	Office		Party	Total	%	P.	Total	%	P.	Result	Swing	Ref.
1910	California State Assembly	74th	Republican	Unknown results			3,045	15.58%	2nd	Won	Hold	
1912	California State Assembly	61st	Independent	Unknown results			2,782	24.88%	2nd	Lost	Gain	
1914	U.S. House of Representatives	9th	Prohibition	Unknown results			4,307	54.16%	1st	Won	Gain	
1916	U.S. House of Representatives	9th	Prohibition	Unknown results			58,826	57.81%	1st	Won	Gain	
1918	U.S. House of Representatives	9th	Prohibition	Unknown results			38,782	52.99%	1st	Won	Hold	
1920	U.S. House of Representatives	9th	Prohibition	Unknown results			36,675	34.78%	2nd	Lost	Gain	
1924	U.S. House of Representatives	9th	Prohibition	Unknown results			67,735	36.08%	2nd	Lost	Hold	
1925	Los Angeles City Council	1st	Nonpartisan	2,851	33.52%	2nd	4,292	53.58%	1st	Won	N/A	
1927	Los Angeles City Council	1st	Nonpartisan	2,851	51.01%	1st	Runoff cancelled			Won	N/A	
1928	U.S. Senate	CA	Prohibition	3,587	52.03%	1st	92,106	5.94%	3rd	Lost	Hold	
1929	Los Angeles City Council	1st	Nonpartisan	4,734	48.62%	1st	8,529	53.63%	1st	Won	N/A	
1931	Los Angeles City Council	1st	Nonpartisan	5,856	55.90%	1st	Runoff cancelled			Won	N/A	
1932	U.S. House of Representatives	13th	Republican	Unknown results			53,449	43.12%	2nd	Lost	Gain	
1933	Los Angeles City Council	1st	Nonpartisan	4,889	25.42%	2nd	8,375	34.80%	2nd	Lost	N/A	
1934	U.S. House of Representatives	13th	Prohibition	Unknown results			18,760	14.05%	3rd	Lost	Hold	
1940	U.S. House of Representatives	13th	Prohibition	Unknown results			18,760	14.05%	3rd	Lost	Hold	
1944	U.S. House of Representatives	20th	Prohibition	Unknown results			3,615	1.66%	3rd	Lost	Hold	
1945	Los Angeles City Council	1st	Nonpartisan	1,391	9.11%	3rd	Did not advance			Lost	N/A	
1950	California State Assembly	45th	Prohibition	Unknown results			3,045	15.58%	2nd	Lost	Hold	

Political offices
Preceded by Constituency established	Los Angeles City Council; 1st District; 1925–1933	Succeeded by Jim Wilson
Preceded by Winfred J. Sanborn	President of the Los Angeles City Council; 1931–1933	Succeeded by Howard W. Davis
U.S. House of Representatives
Preceded by Charles W. Bell	Member of the U.S. House of Representatives from California's 9th congressional district 1915–1921	Succeeded by Walter F. Lineberger
