= Charles W. Bell =

American politician (1857–1927)

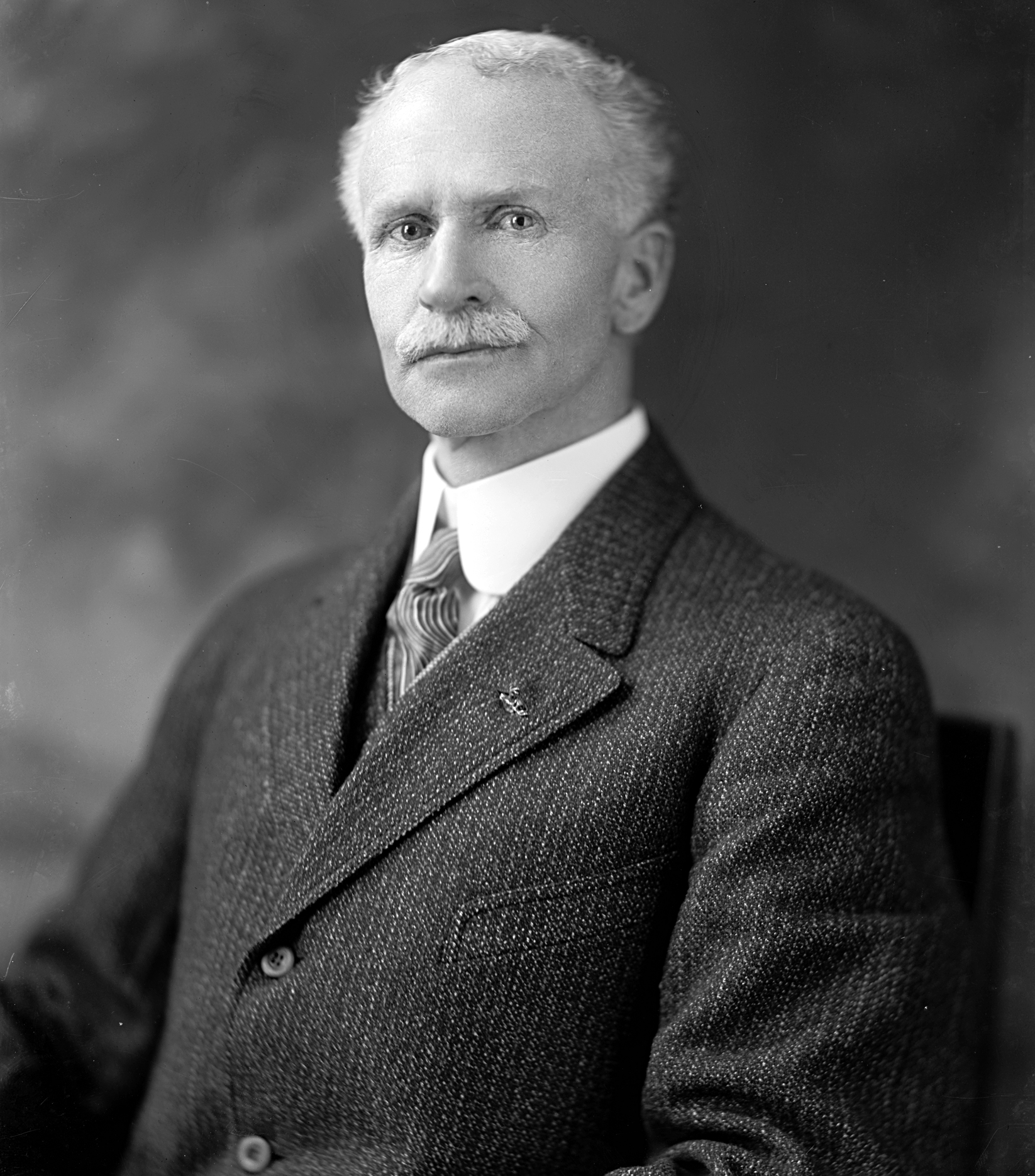

Member of the U.S. House of Representatives from California's 9th district
- In office March 4, 1913 – March 3, 1915
- Preceded by: District established
- Succeeded by: Charles H. Randall

Member of the California Senate from the 36th district
- In office January 7, 1907 – January 6, 1913
- Preceded by: Benjamin W. Hahn
- Succeeded by: William J. Carr

Majority Leader of the California State Senate
- In office 1911

Personal details
- Born: Charles Webster Bell; June 11, 1857 Albany, New York
- Died: April 19, 1927 (aged 69) Pasadena, California
- Resting place: Mountain View Cemetery

Charles Webster Bell (June 11, 1857 – April 19, 1927) was an American politician who served one term as a U.S. representative from California from 1913 to 1915.

== Biography ==
Born in Albany, New York, Bell attended public schools. He moved to California in 1877 and settled in Pasadena, Los Angeles County, where he engaged in fruit growing and the real estate business. Bell was member of the Pasadena Republican Club. Moreover, he also served as a county clerk of Los Angeles County from 1899 to 1903.

=== State Senate ===
He was also a member of the state Senate from 1907 to 1913. It was said that he was an independent man, not subject to partisanship, which led to the formation of the Lincoln Roosevelt republican league, and a big defeat for the partisans. In 1911 he was the Majority Leader in the California State Senate. Bell authored SCA 8 in 1911, which gave women the right to vote in California, and authored a bill that abolished racetrack gambling and caused the banishment of horse racing. Bell was against anti-Japanese sentiment, but also for local control of the law.

=== Congress ===
Bell was elected as a Progressive Republican to the Sixty-third Congress (March 4, 1913 – March 3, 1915). The three way contest showed him getting 22,951 votes, while opponent Thomas H. Kirk (Democrat) received 11,703, and Ralph L. Criswell (Socialist) received 9,192. He pledged to work for the protective tariff for citrus fruits and sugar beets. However, he lost his re-election campaign to Charles Hiram Randall of the Prohibition Party. Bell ran unsuccessfully a second time against Randall as an independent in 1916.

=== Later career ===
After the end of his political services, Bell resumed his former business pursuits in Pasadena, California and became secretary of the Pasadena Mercantile Finance Corporation.

== Personal life ==
Bell was a married man with a son born in 1894.

=== Death and burial ===
On April 19, 1927, Bell died in Pasadena, California. Bell is interred in Mountain View Cemetery.

== Electoral history ==
United States House of Representatives elections, 1912
Party	Candidate	Votes	%
Republican	Charles W. Bell	28,845	47.2
Democratic	Thomas H. Kirk	14,571	23.9
Socialist	Ralph L. Criswell	11,123	18.2
Prohibition	George S. Yarnall	6,510	10.7
Total votes		61,049	100.0
Turnout			
Republican win (new seat)			

United States House of Representatives elections, 1914
Party	Candidate	Votes	%
Prohibition	Charles Hiram Randall	28,097	30.9
Progressive	Charles W. Bell (incumbent)	27,560	30.3
Republican	Frank C. Roberts	25,176	27.7
Socialist	Henry A. Hart	10,084	11.1
Total votes		90,917	100.0
Turnout			
Prohibition gain from Republican			

United States House of Representatives elections, 1916
Party	Candidate	Votes	%
Prohibition	Charles Hiram Randall (Incumbent)	58,826	57.8
Independent	Charles W. Bell	33,270	32.7
Socialist	Ralph L. Criswell	9,661	9.5
Total votes		101,757	100.0
Turnout			
Prohibition hold			

U.S. House of Representatives
New district	Member of the U.S. House of Representatives from California's 9th congressional district 1913–1915	Succeeded by Charles H. Randall
