= Stanley B. Wilson =

American socialist (1869–1937)

The Reverend Stanley B. Wilson
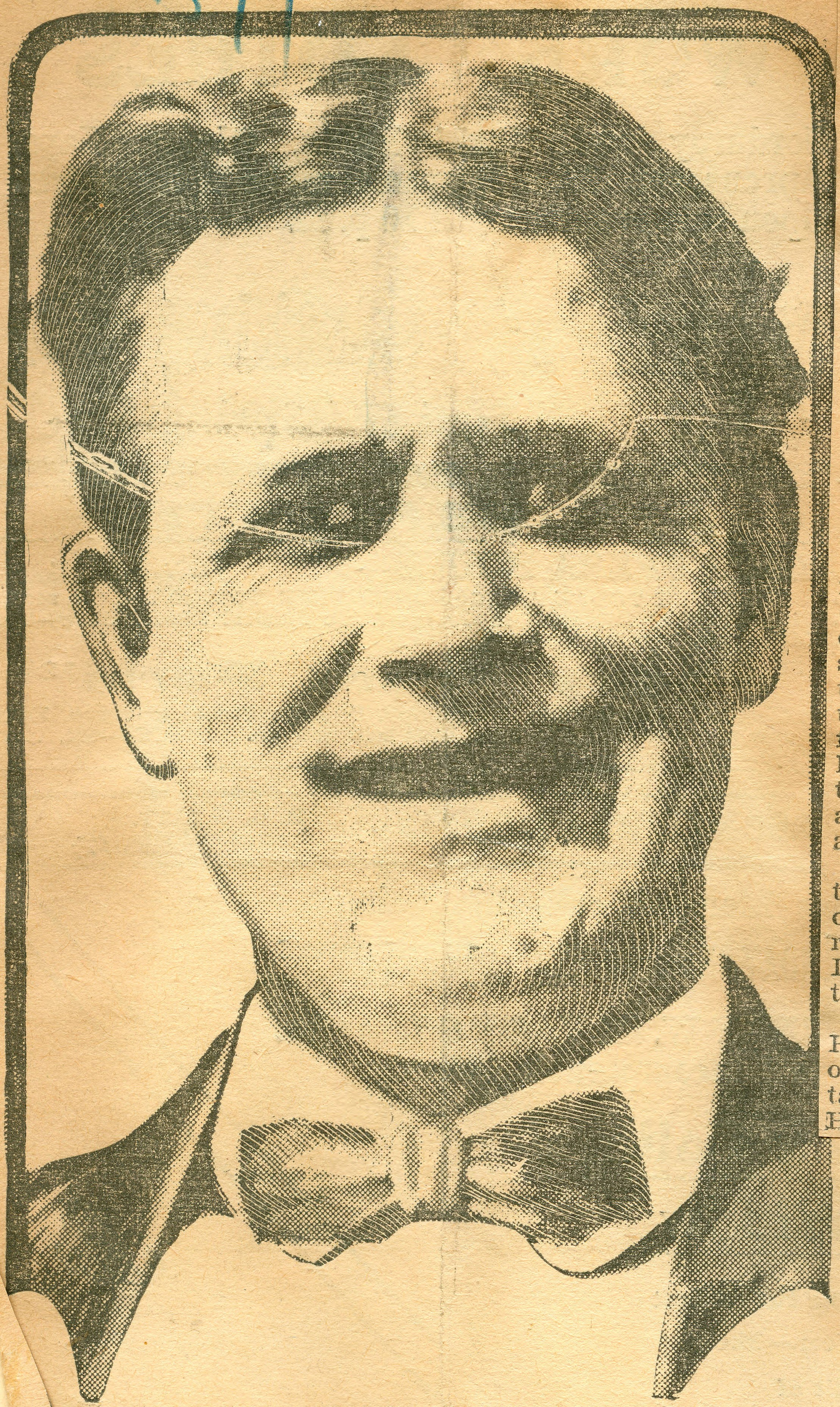
- Wilson in 1906

Member of the California State Board of Education
- In office December 21, 1918 – November 9, 1923
- Appointed by: William Stephens
- Preceded by: Charles A. Whitmore
- Succeeded by: S. D. Merk

Personal details
- Born: October 11, 1869 Arnprior, Ontario, Canada
- Died: January 27, 1937 (aged 67) Los Angeles, California, U.S.
- Resting place: Forest Lawn Memorial Park
- Party: Republican
- Other political affiliations: Prohibition (1890); Public Ownership (1906); Democratic (1908); Socialist (1911–1915)
- Spouse: Georgia M. Baxter (m. 1891)
- Children: Charlotte; Ethel
- Education: University of Southern California
- Occupation: Labor leader, newspaper publisher, preacher
- Known for: 1906 Los Angeles mayoral election The Western Comrade

Stanley Brock Wilson (October 11, 1869 – January 27, 1937) was a Canadian-American labor leader, newspaper publisher and Methodist preacher who served two terms on the California State Board of Education. In 1906, he ran for mayor of Los Angeles on the Public Ownership ticket. In 1918, Governor William Stephens appointed Wilson to a seat on the California State Board of Education, where he served until 1923. Throughout his life he edited and published several newspapers and magazines, including The Western Comrade.

== Early life ==
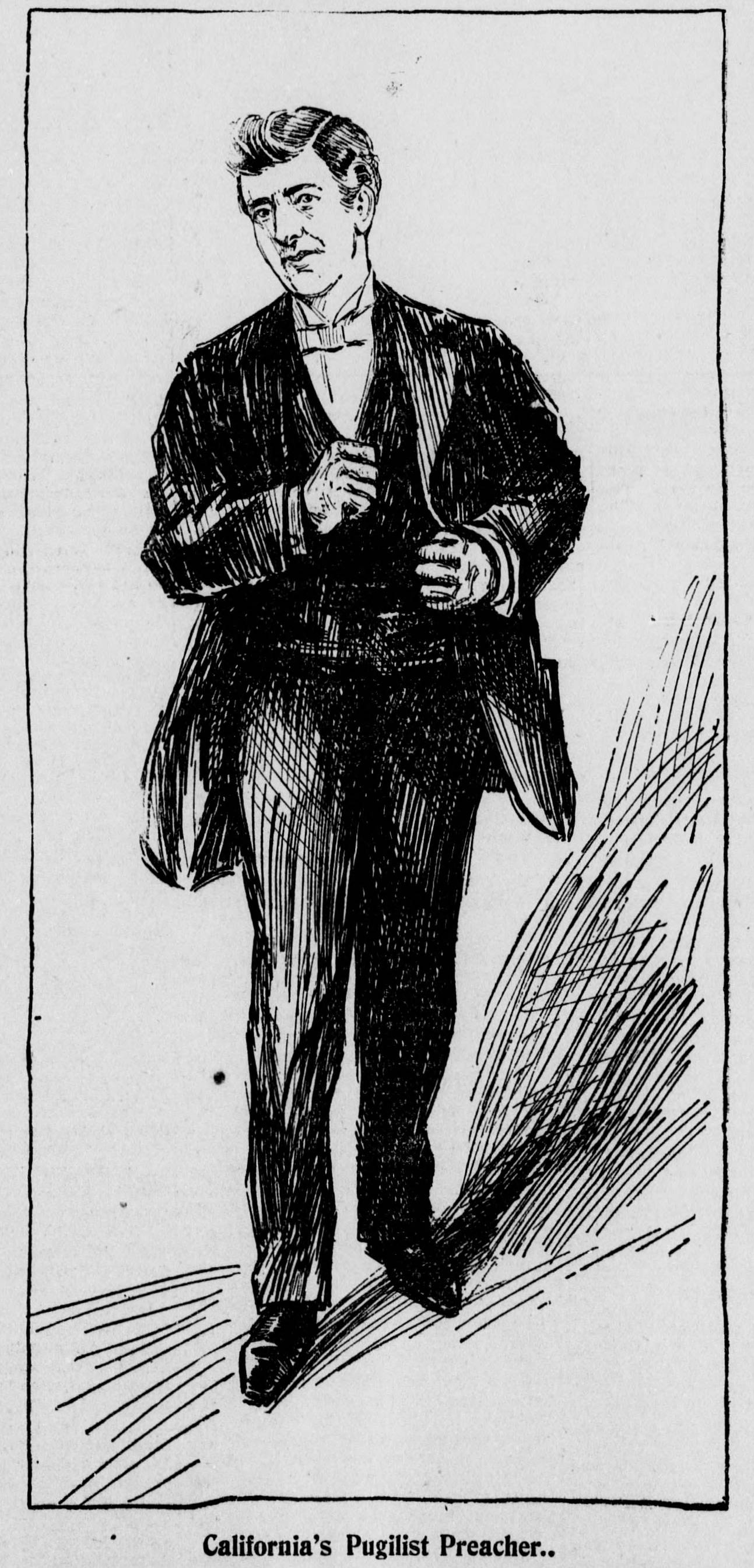
1898 illustration of Wilson as "California's Pugilist Preacher"

Stanley Brock Wilson was born on October 11, 1869, in Arnprior, Ontario. He was the second of eight children born to William Wilson, an Irish immigrant, and his wife Martha, a Canadian native. Wilson immigrated to the United States at 18, settling in San Diego County with his brother.

Wilson's political and religious career began not long after arriving in Southern California; in 1889 he was elected chaplain of a local Band of Hope, and in 1890 he was Secretary of the San Diego County Prohibition Party. Later that year he was the party's candidate for San Diego County Clerk.

Wilson first came to prominence in the 1890s as a preacher and newspaper publisher in Ramona, California. After some time working for other papers, he acquired The Ramona Sentinel (the only newspaper in the area) in 1897 and became its editor.

=== "Pugilist Preacher" ===
Soon after taking over the Sentinel, Wilson was involved in at least two fistfights with locals. The first involved a man from Julian who confronted Wilson after being labeled a "bully" by the Sentinel. The second allegedly involved a group of American Indians about to attack a man. Wilson won both fights, and was dubbed the “pugilist preacher” by The Los Angeles Herald.

== Political career ==
Despite his earlier association with the Prohibition Party, by 1898 Wilson was an active Republican, stumping for William McKinley. In 1899 he was appointed a clerk to the State Assembly, and in 1900 he was made gatekeeper of the State Senate. That same year, he leased the Sentinel and moved to San Francisco. By 1903, he had settled in Los Angeles, and in 1905 he was elected president of the Los Angeles Typographical Union.

=== 1906 Los Angeles mayoral campaign ===
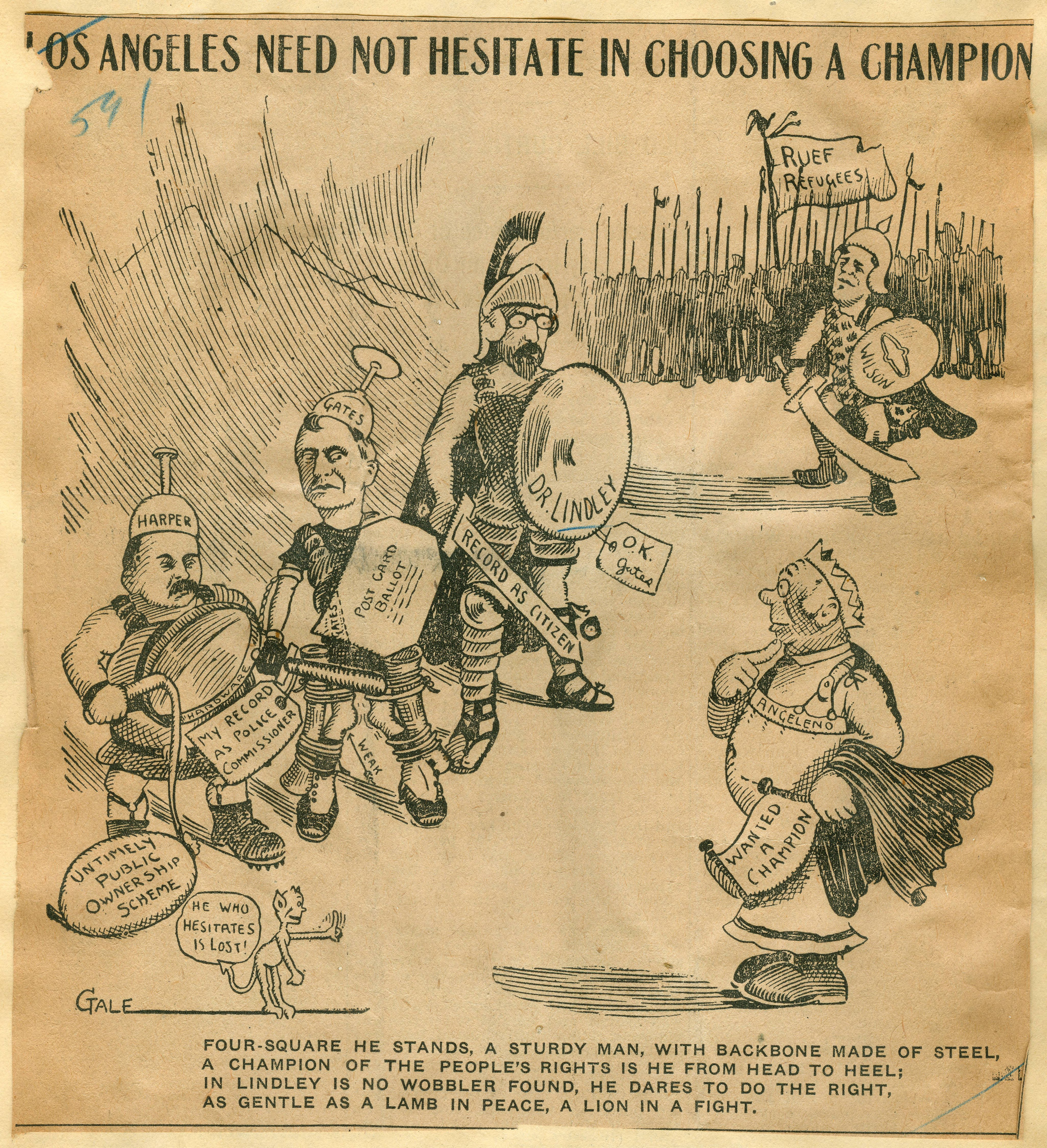
Pro-Lindley cartoon from the 1906 election depicting the candidates as gladiators of varying strength. Wilson is shown in the back leading a legion of "Ruef refugees."

On February 21, 1906, representatives of Los Angeles organized labor came together to form the Public Ownership Party, on the basis that anti-labor forces controlled city hall and private ownership of utilities was the source of political corruption. Wilson took an early leadership role in the party, serving as chairman at the founding convention. In September the party announced its platform and ticket, with Wilson chosen unanimously as the candidate for mayor.

Wilson campaigned on a platform that included banishing corporate lobbyists from city hall, restricting the sale of liquor, and an eight-hour workday for city employees. His opponents were Democratic banker Arthur C. Harper, Republican doctor Walter Lindley, Non-Partisan attorney Lee C. Gates, Socialist carpenter Frank A. Marek, and Prohibitionist Wiley J. Phillips (another reverend-turned-newspaper editor).

During the campaign, his opponents accused him of being a puppet of the San Francisco political boss Abe Ruef, charging that refugees of the 1906 earthquake would be sent south en masse to steal the election. Wilson, for his part, denounced Ruef, comparing him to the Democratic and Republican bosses that ran Los Angeles.

Wilson would ultimately lose the election to Democrat Arthur Cyprian Harper, coming in fourth place with just over 12 percent of the vote.

== Personal life ==
Wilson married Georgia M. Baxter on June 1, 1891, in Sultan, Washington. They had two daughters, Charlotte and Ethel.

On May 31, 1913, Charlotte Wilson married Floyd De Hay, an unemployed youth that had recently been released from reform school and taken in by her father. Four days later, she filed for annulment, charging that De Hay had forced her to marry him by threatening to kill her and her father. De Hay was soon arrested, and the annulment was granted that August.

== Works ==
- Can a Catholic Be a Socialist? Los Angeles: The Citizen Print Shop, 1912.
- The Gospel of Socialism. Los Angeles: The Citizen Print Shop, 1913.
- The Western Comrade. Los Angeles: The Citizen Publishing Company, 1913–1918.
