= 1916 California's 10th congressional district special election =

- November 7, 1916
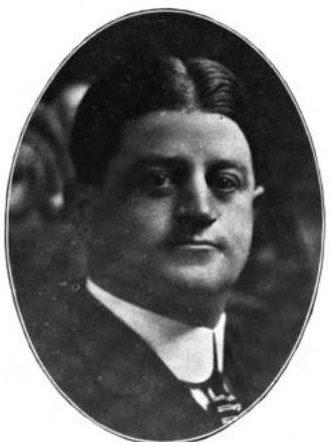
Nominee	Henry S. Benedict	Joy Clark
Party	Progressive	Independent
Popular vote	19,032	7,147
Percentage	62.8%	23.6%
U.S. Representative before election
William Stephens
Progressive
Elected U.S. Representative
Henry S. Benedict
Progressive

On July 22, 1916, Progressive William Stephens, a U.S. Representative in California's 10th congressional district, resigned to become Lieutenant Governor of California, an appointment he accepted after former Lieutenant Governor John M. Eshleman died in office. To fill the vacancy created by Stephens' resignation, a special election was held for the remainder of the term. It was scheduled for November 7, 1916, the same day as the general election for the full term beginning March 4, 1917.

== Campaign ==
California State Senator Henry S. Benedict announced his candidacy for the congressional seat on July 28, 1916, entering the race for both the short term and the full term. As a state senator, he had helped pass or authored several bills regarding land use, support of public libraries, and financial controls. Benedict also supported tax relief for Southern California's growing film industry, comparing its impact to the citrus industry that was booming in the Los Angeles area at the time. On August 2, 1916, Benedict received the endorsement of Lt. Gov. Stephens. In a speech at the Fraternal Brotherhood Hall on Figueroa Street in Los Angeles, Benedict told a large audience of his platform, and was mentioned in a Los Angeles Herald news article that stated,

He strongly favors the election of [Charles Evans] Hughes and [Charles W.] Fairbanks, a protective tariff, national woman's suffrage, a national child labor law and workmen's compensation act, adequate [World War I] preparedness and proper protection for the Pacific coast.

Benedict's campaign had some difficulties leading up to the special and regular primaries on August 29, 1916. He had been campaigning for the Republican and Progressive nominations in both elections, and assuming that the Progressive nominations were all but secured he decided to campaign more heavily for the Republican nomination for the full term. After the results came in, Republican Henry Z. Osborne secured the nomination of his party for the full term, denying Benedict that nomination, but he secured the Progressive nomination in that race.

The issues arose when the Progressive returns in the special primary came in and it was not apparent that Benedict was the winner. Voters had written in Benedict's name 23 different ways, and California's Secretary of State, the Los Angeles County Board of Supervisors, and other Los Angeles County officials had to decide if these votes would count for Benedict.

The matter was referred to the California Supreme Court, which decided that Benedict could run in the November special election as a Progressive. This ruling also affected other candidates, allowing anyone who won a party's nomination to appear on the ballot. After the Supreme Court's decision, the Republican State Central Committee spent considerable time and money urging voters to elect Osborne (who had not run in the special primary) to the full term in the 10th District, while Benedict's name should be written in for the short term.

This decision by the Republican Party angered some voters; one, John C. Wray, decided to enter the race, writing in a news article that

TO THE PUBLIC: October 23 I made public announcement of my intention to request my friends to write my name (John C. Wray) in on the vacant space on the official ballot which will be on November 7th for Member of Congress for the Unexpired Term, or Short Term of Congress in the 10th District, in which I have rented for 31 years. I am an uncontrolled Republican. Now comes Henry Stanley Benedict, who was defeated by H. Z. Osborne at the Primary Election, and asks that his name be written in for the short term, notwithstanding the act that the name of Henry Stanley Benedict is printed on the Official Ballot as a candidate for the Long Term, and naturally he (Benedict) will secure thousands of votes, which in all decency, and In fair play, should be cast for Henry Z. Osborne. I deny the right of any man to deliver my vote in advance of the day of, or on the day of election. I am an American citizen. I am acting as my own Manager, paying my own expenses, and only solicit the free and uncontrollable votes of the electors of the Tenth Congressional District, who like myself will refuse to be delivered like a band of sheep on November 7th. Signed, JOHN C. WRAY.

Just two days prior to the election, prominent Los Angeles businessman Joy Clark entered the race as a write-in candidate with many supporters flocking to his cause. A native of Omaha, Nebraska and a graduate of the University of Chicago, Clark was married to Florence Wood, daughter of prominent vocalist Charles Modini Wood.

== Results ==
Henry S. Benedict was elected on November 7, 1916, as a Progressive, to finish the term. Joy Clark finished second, and John C. Wray finished seventh and last.

Henry Z. Osborne was elected the same day as a Republican to the full term beginning March 4, 1917. Benedict, the Progressive nominee in that race, withdrew in favor of Osborne.

1916 10th congressional district special election
Party	Candidate	Votes	%
Progressive	Henry S. Benedict (write-in)	19,062	62.82
Independent	Joy Clark (write-in)	7,149	23.59
Prohibition	Henry Clay Needham (write-in)	1,310	4.32
Unknown	George Clark (write-in)	1,073	3.54
Socialist	James H. Ryckman (write-in)	911	3.01
Democratic	Rufus V. Bowden (write-in)	553	1.83
Unknown	John C. Wray (write-in)	270	0.89
Total votes		30,328	100.0
Turnout			
Progressive hold			

== See also ==
- 1916 United States House of Representatives elections
