= 1906 Los Angeles mayoral election =

- December 4, 1906
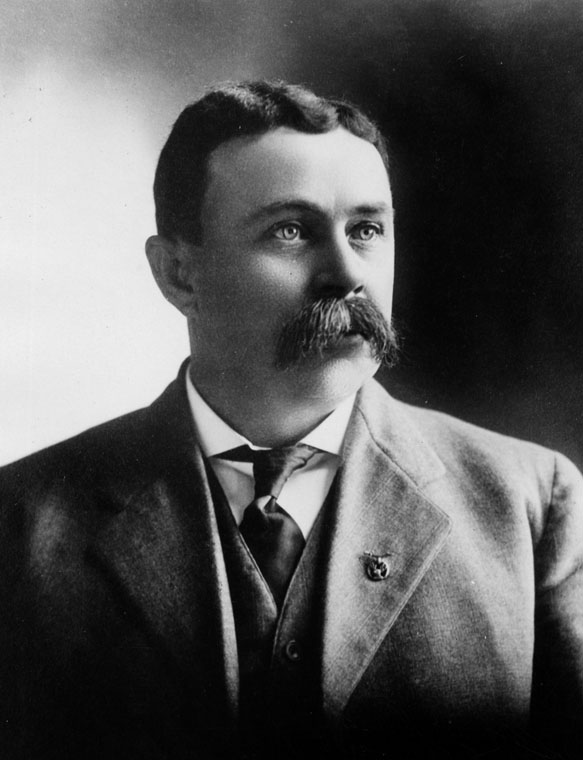

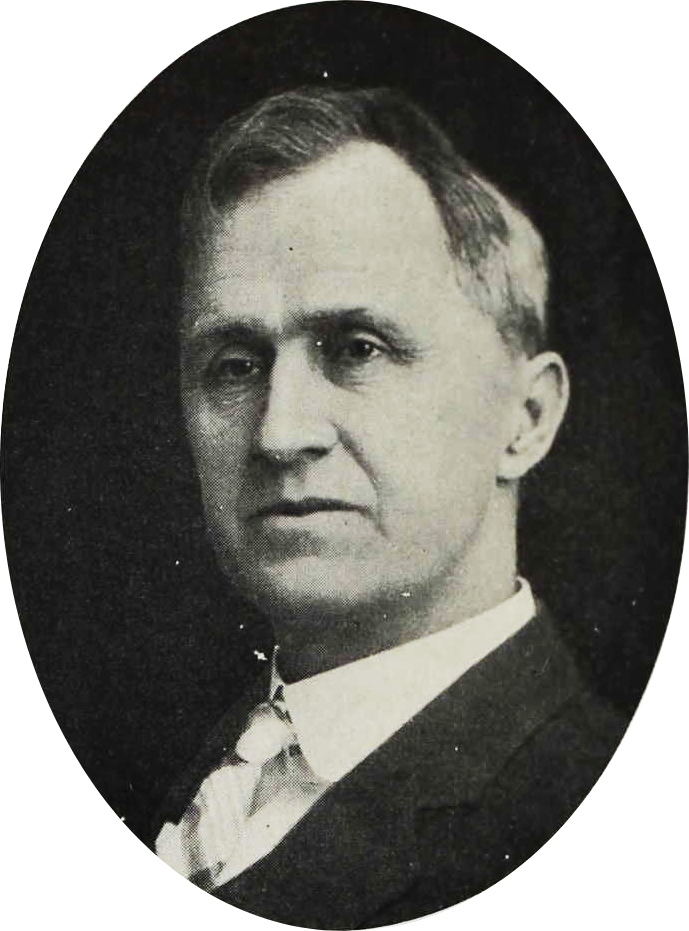

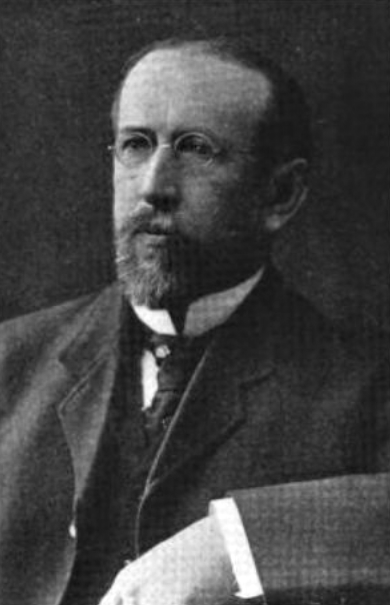

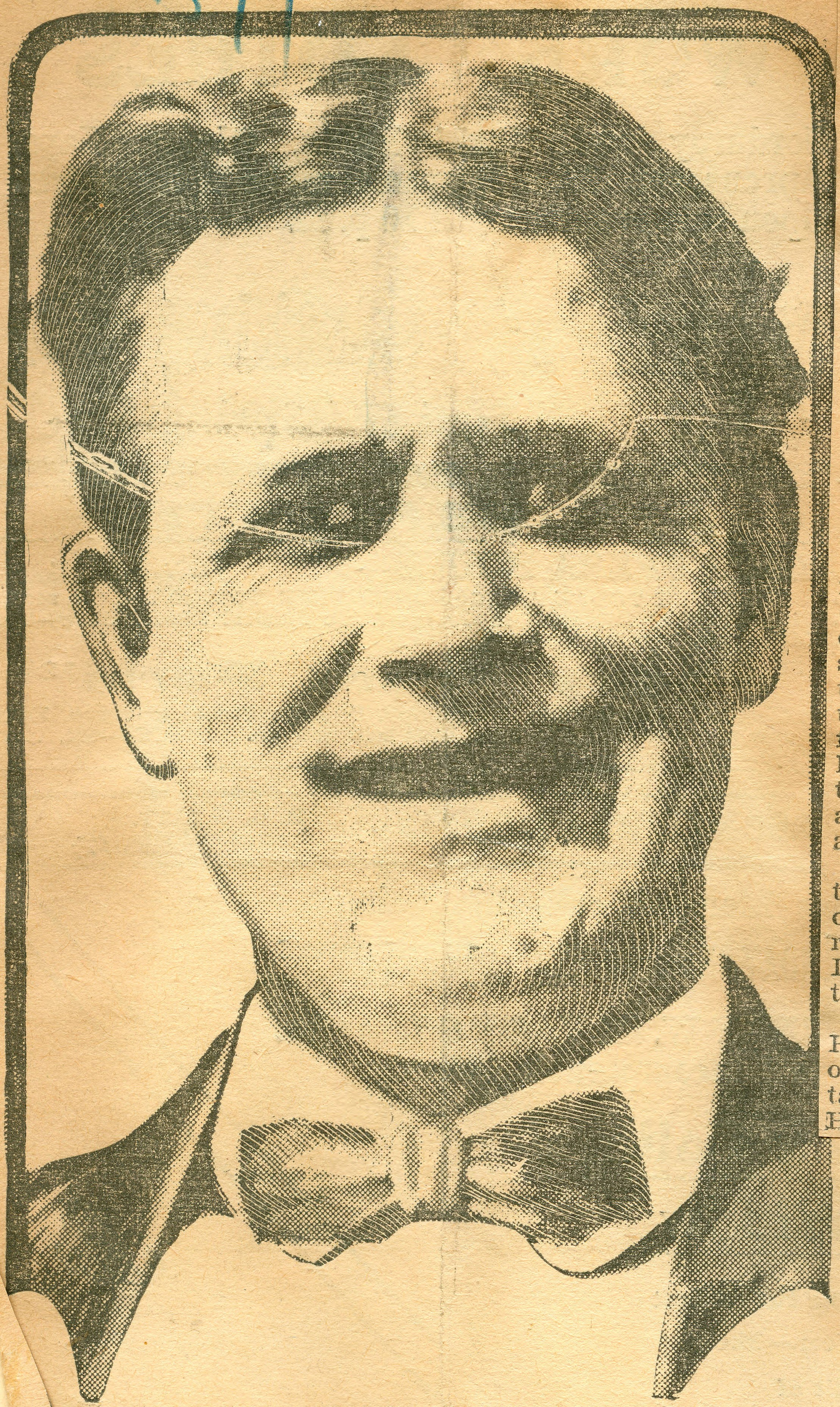
Candidate	Arthur Cyprian Harper	Lee C. Gates
Party	Democratic	Independent
Popular vote	11,064	9,004
Percentage	33.63%	27.37%
Candidate	Walter Lindley	Stanley B. Wilson
Party	Republican	Public Ownership Party
Popular vote	7,209	4,011
Percentage	21.91%	12.19%
Mayor before election
Owen McAleer
Republican
Elected Mayor
Arthur Cyprian Harper
Democratic

The 1906 Los Angeles mayoral election was held on December 4, 1906. Arthur Cyprian Harper was elected. It was the last partisan mayoral election held in the city.

== Campaign ==
=== Public Ownership Party ===
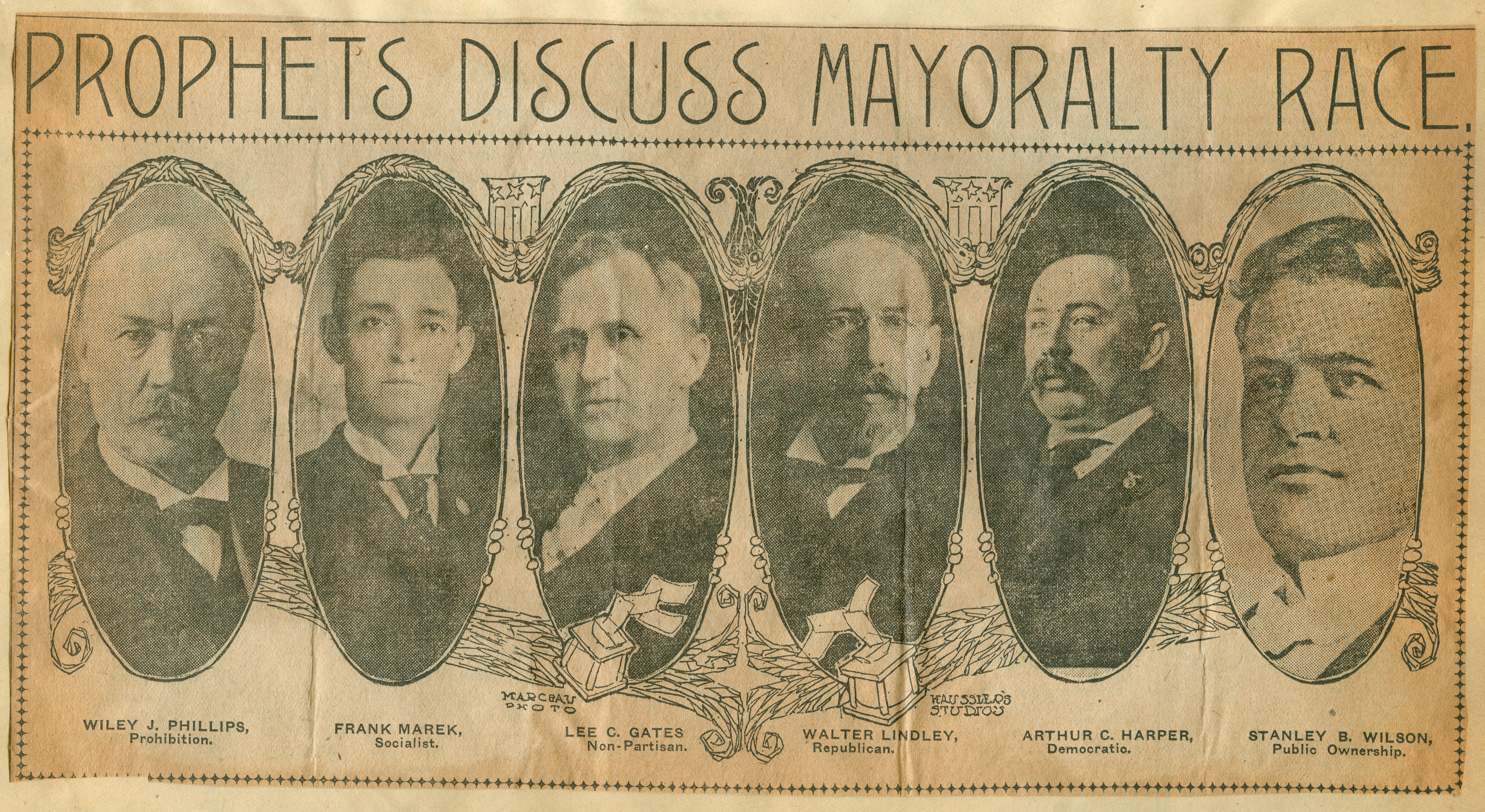
The candidates as they appeared in the Los Angeles Examiner.

On February 21, 1906, representatives of Los Angeles organized labor came together to form the Public Ownership Party, on the basis that anti-labor forces controlled city hall and private ownership of utilities was the source of political corruption. Stanley B. Wilson, president of the Los Angeles Typographical Union, took an early leadership role in the party, serving as chairman at the founding convention. In September the party announced its platform and ticket, with Wilson chosen unanimously as the candidate for mayor.

Wilson campaigned on a platform that included banishing corporate lobbyists from city hall, restricting the sale of liquor, and an eight-hour workday for city employees. During the race, his opponents accused him of being a puppet of the San Francisco political boss Abe Ruef, charging that refugees of the 1906 earthquake would be sent south en masse to steal the election. Wilson, for his part, denounced Ruef, comparing him to the Democratic and Republican bosses that ran Los Angeles.

== Polling ==
Poll source	Date(s) administered	Sample size (Note: Key: A – all adults RV – registered voters LV – likely voters CV – certain voters V – unclear)	Margin of error	Lee Gates (I)	Walter Lindley (R)	Arthur Harper (D)	Stanley Wilson (PO)	Other / Undecided
Los Angeles Express	November 1906	11,067 (CV)	± 4.3%	38%	28%	19%	14%	2%

== Results ==
Los Angeles mayoral general election, December 4, 1906
Party	Candidate	Votes	%
Democratic	Arthur Cyprian Harper	11,064	33.63
Independent	Lee C. Gates	9,004	27.37
Republican	Walter Lindley	7,209	21.91
Public Ownership Party	Stanley B. Wilson	4,011	12.19
Socialist	Frank A. Marek	959	2.91
Prohibition	Wiley J. Phillips	655	1.99
Total votes		32,902	100.00
Democratic gain from Republican			
