= Henry S. Benedict =

American politician

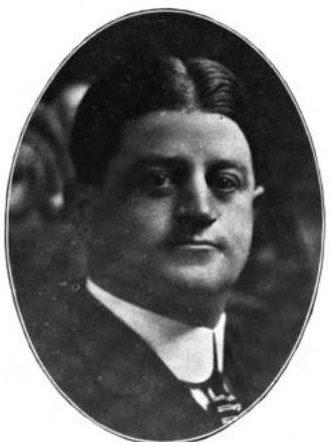

Member of the U.S. House of Representatives from California's 10th district
- In office November 7, 1916 – March 3, 1917
- Preceded by: William Stephens
- Succeeded by: Henry Z. Osborne

Member of the California Senate from the 34th district
- In office January 4, 1915 – November 7, 1916
- Preceded by: Lee C. Gates
- Succeeded by: Charles W. Lyon

Member of the California State Assembly from the 63rd district
- In office January 6, 1913 – January 4, 1915
- Preceded by: John F. Beckett
- Succeeded by: Alfred L. Bartlett

Member of the California State Assembly from the 72nd district
- In office January 2, 1911 – January 6, 1913
- Preceded by: John N. O. Rech
- Succeeded by: Arthur G. Kuck

Personal details
- Born: Henry Stanley Benedict; February 20, 1878 Boonville, Missouri, United States
- Died: July 10, 1930 (aged 52) London, England, United Kingdom
- Resting place: Forest Lawn Memorial Park in Glendale, California
- Party: Republican
- Education: University of Southern California College of Law

Henry Stanley Benedict (February 20, 1878 – July 10, 1930) was an American lawyer and politician who served briefly as a U.S. Representative from California from 1916 to 1917.

== Early life and education ==
Benedict was born in Boonville, Missouri in 1878 and moved with his parents to Los Angeles, California in 1888. He attended grammar and high school in Los Angeles and then went on to attend the University of Southern California College of Law in Los Angeles, California. Benedict was admitted to the bar in 1910 and began practicing law in Los Angeles, California.

== Political career ==
He served as a member of the California State Assembly from 1910 to 1914, and a member of the California State Senate from 1914 to 1916.

=== Congress ===
A Republican, Benedict was elected to the Sixty-fourth Congress to fill the vacancy caused by the resignation of United States Representative William D. Stephens (November 7, 1916 – March 3, 1917). He was nominated by the Progressive Party for the Sixty-fifth Congress but withdrew in favor of the Republican nominee.

== Later career ==
Throughout his political career, Benedict continued to practice law and also engaged in banking. He served as member of the California State Board of Control from 1919 to 1921 and as a member of the California State Railroad Commission from 1921 to 1923.

== Death and burial ==
Benedict died on July 10, 1930, in London, England while there on a visit. He was interred in Forest Lawn Memorial Park in Glendale, California.

== Federal electoral history ==
1916 10th congressional district special election
Party	Candidate	Votes	%
Progressive	Henry S. Benedict (write-in)	19,062	62.82
Independent	Joy Clark (write-in)	7,149	23.59
Prohibition	Henry Clay Needham (write-in)	1,310	4.32
Unknown	George Clark (write-in)	1,073	3.54
Socialist	James H. Ryckman (write-in)	911	3.01
Democratic	Rufus V. Bowden (write-in)	553	1.83
Unknown	John C. Wray (write-in)	270	0.89
Total votes		30,328	100.0
Turnout			
Progressive hold			

1916 United States House of Representatives elections
Party	Candidate	Votes	%
Republican	Henry Z. Osborne	63,913	49.5
Democratic	Rufus W. Bowden	33,225	25.7
Progressive	Henry Stanley Benedict	14,305	11.1
Socialist	James H. Ryckman	9,000	7.0
Prohibition	Henry Clay Needham	8,781	6.8
Total votes		129,224	100.0
Turnout			
Republican hold			

U.S. House of Representatives
Preceded by William D. Stephens	Member of the U.S. House of Representatives from California's 10th congressional district 1916–1917	Succeeded by Henry Z. Osborne
