= Alfred J. Elliott =

American politician

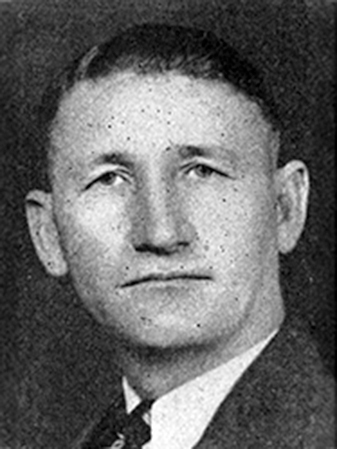
- Official portrait, c. 1937–1949

Member of the U.S. House of Representatives from California's 10th district
- In office May 4, 1937 – January 3, 1949
- Preceded by: Henry E. Stubbs
- Succeeded by: Thomas H. Werdel

Personal details
- Born: Alfred James Elliott; June 1, 1895 Guinda, California
- Died: January 17, 1973 (aged 77) Tulare, California
- Resting place: Tulare Cemetery
- Party: Democratic

Alfred James Elliott (June 1, 1895 – January 17, 1973) was an American farmer, newspaperman and politician who served six terms as a Democratic Representative from California from 1937 to 1949.

== Early life and career ==
He was born in Guinda, California, and moved with his parents to Winters, California, in 1901, and to Tulare, California, in 1910, where he resided until his death in 1973. He worked as a farmer and livestock breeder and was the owner and publisher of the Tulare Daily News. From 1933 to 1937, he served as the chairman of the Tulare County Board of Supervisors. From 1935 to 1936, he was a member of the California Supervisor Association of the State welfare board and in 1936 he served on the California State Safety Council.

== Congress ==
He was first elected to the United States House of Representatives in 1937, by special election to fill the vacancy caused by the death of Henry E. Stubbs. He was re-elected to represent California's 10th congressional district five times and served from 1937 to 1949. He retired in 1965.

Elliot was among the most outspoken in expressing bigotry toward Japanese Americans. In 1943 he protested the release of some Japanese Americans from the relocation camps, repeating his earlier statement that "the only good Jap is a dead Jap," and declaring that "When the war is over, as far as I am concerned, we should ship every Jap in the United States back to Japan . . ."

== Death ==
Elliot died on January 17, 1973, in Tulare, California at the age of 77 and was interred in Tulare Cemetery.

- United States Congress. "Alfred J. Elliott (id: E000119)". Biographical Directory of the United States Congress.

== Electoral history ==
1937 10th congressional district special election
Party	Candidate	Votes	%
Democratic	Alfred J. Elliott	22,321	48.91
Republican	Harry A. Hopkins	17,678	38.74
California Progressive Party	Al Sessions	5,638	12.35
Total votes		45,637	100
Turnout			
Democratic hold			

1938 United States House of Representatives elections
Party	Candidate	Votes	%
Democratic	Alfred J. Elliott (Incumbent)	84,791	67.3
Republican	F. Fred Hoelscher	41,194	32.7
Total votes		125,985	100.0
Turnout			
Democratic hold			

1940 United States House of Representatives elections
Party	Candidate	Votes	%
Democratic	Alfred J. Elliott (Incumbent)	125,845	97.0
Communist	Louretta Adams	3,826	3.0
Total votes		129,671	100
Turnout			
Democratic hold			

1942 United States House of Representatives elections
Party	Candidate	Votes	%
Democratic	Alfred J. Elliott (Incumbent)	43,864	100.0
Turnout		43,864	100
Democratic hold			

1944 United States House of Representatives elections
Party	Candidate	Votes	%
Democratic	Alfred J. Elliott (Incumbent)	60,001	100.0
Turnout		60,001	100
Democratic hold			

1946 United States House of Representatives elections
Party	Candidate	Votes	%
Democratic	Alfred J. Elliott (Incumbent)	51,843	100.0
Turnout			100
Democratic hold			

U.S. House of Representatives
Preceded by Henry E. Stubbs	Member of the U.S. House of Representatives from California's 10th congressional district 1937–1949	Succeeded by Thomas H. Werdel
