= William H. Savage =

American politician

William Savage
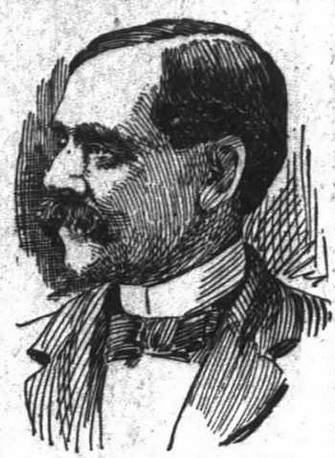

Member of the California Senate from the 34th district
- In office January 5, 1903 – January 2, 1911
- Preceded by: Sylvester C. Smith
- Succeeded by: Lee C. Gates

Member of the California State Assembly from the 72nd district
- In office January 1, 1901 – January 5, 1903
- Preceded by: Joseph M. Miller
- Succeeded by: Herbert Swift Greenwood McCartney

Personal details
- Born: March 15, 1840 County Limerick, Ireland
- Died: May 25, 1930 (aged 90) San Pedro, California, US
- Party: Republican
- Spouse: Mary A. White (m. 1865; died 1907) Catherine Hartnett (m. 1908; died 1925)
- Children: 7

Military service
- Branch/service: United States Marine Corps; United States Army
- Battles/wars: American Civil War; American Indian Wars

William Henry Savage (March 15, 1840 – May 25, 1930) served in the California State Assembly for the 72nd district from 1901 to 1903. He also served in the California State Senate for the 34th district from 1903 to 1911 and during the American Civil War he served in the US Army. William Henry Savage was born in County Limerick, Ireland, likely on July 12, 1837. He was educated in Massachusetts prior to enlisting in the Civil War. He died on May 25, 1930, in San Pedro, California.

== Early life and career ==
Savage was born in County Limerick, Ireland, came to the United States at the age of four, and was educated in the public schools of Boston. He enlisted in the United States Marine Corps in 1861 and served aboard USS Mississippi. When the ship was lost at Port Hudson in 1863, he was taken prisoner. In 1865 he enlisted in the 14th U.S. Infantry, and he served in Arizona Territory from 1866 to 1868. After his discharge in 1872 he settled in Wilmington, California, where he worked as a stevedore, served as a justice of the peace, and studied law. He was admitted to the bar in Los Angeles in the late 1870s.

=== Arizona ===
In 1880 Savage moved to Bisbee, Arizona. That December he was among the owners of nine mining claims in the Warren District "within a mile of the famous Copper Queen". In 1882 he chaired the Cochise County Republican convention, and he was elected to the House of the 12th Arizona Territorial Legislature, representing Cochise County in 1883. He was elected city attorney of Tombstone in January 1884 and was later elected Cochise County district attorney.

=== San Pedro ===
In 1887 Savage returned to Southern California and resumed his law practice. He was elected city attorney of San Pedro and later served on its city council. As a state senator he opposed the 1909 bill to consolidate San Pedro with Los Angeles. He was buried at Calvary Cemetery in Los Angeles.
