= The Western Comrade =

Los Angeles-based socialist magazine (1913–1918)

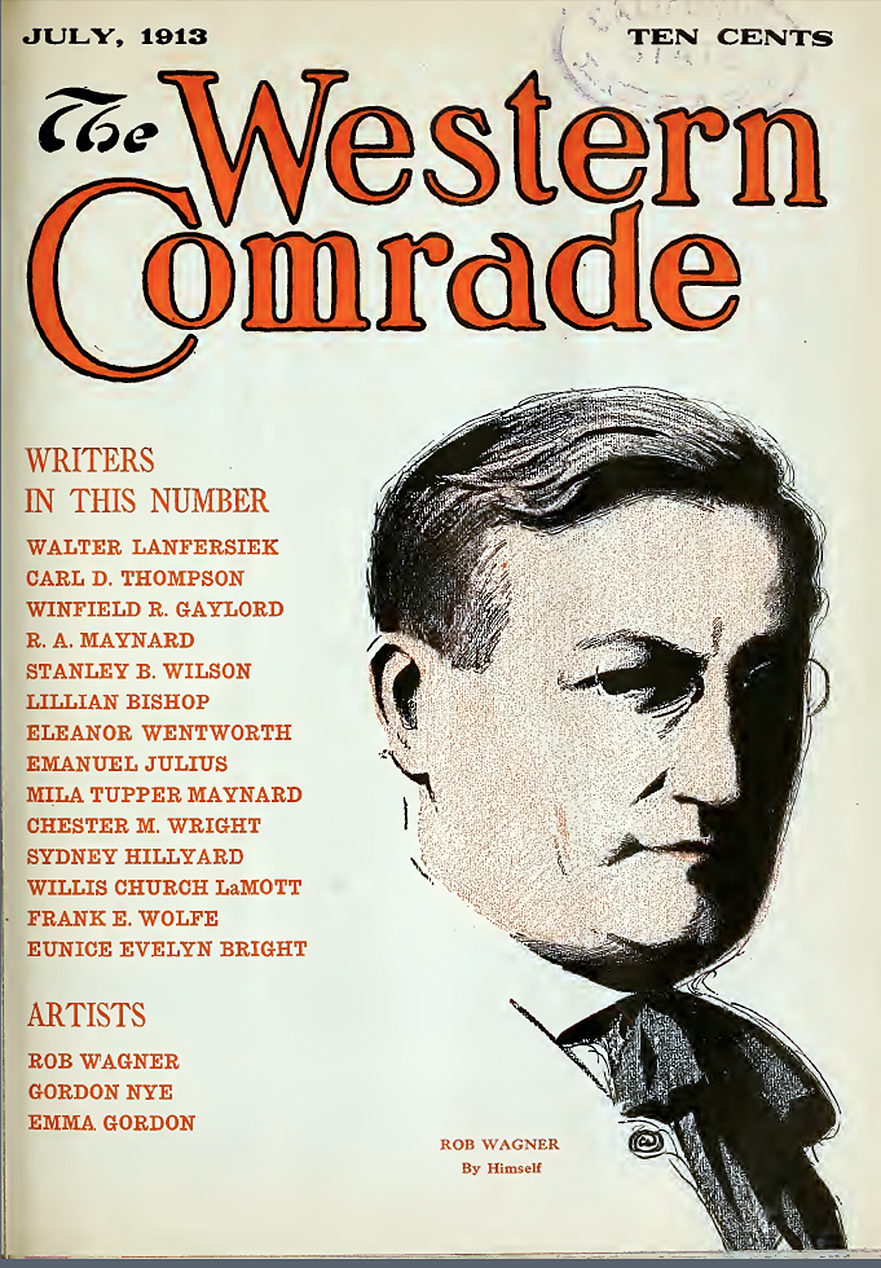
- July 1913 issue
- Categories: Political magazine
- Founded: 1913
- Final issue: 1918
- Country: USA
- Based in: Los Angeles, Calif.

The Western Comrade was a Los Angeles-based socialist magazine published in the US from 1913 to 1918 that advocated progressive causes ranging from women’s suffrage and labor issues to profiles of left-leaning artists and writers.

== History and profile ==
Leading West Coast socialists of the day staffed the magazine, which was closely associated with the Llano del Rio utopian community in California’s Antelope Valley. It began publication in April 1913 as a means to publicize the Llano del Rio project and to attract investors. The magazine went through a succession of editors and writers, but remained under the consistent leadership of Job Harriman, a leader in the Socialist Party and former candidate for mayor of Los Angeles, and Frank E. Wolfe, a Los Angeles newspaperman and early pioneer of labor-themed movies.

The Western Comrade debuted in April 1913 from the offices of the Citizen Publishing Company, 203 New High Street, in Los Angeles. Editors and associate editors were Stanley B. Wilson, Chester M. Wright, Eleanor Wentworth, Mila Tupper Maynard, her husband, Rezin A. Maynard, a former attorney and Christian minister, Emanuel Haldeman-Julius, Rob Wagner and Fred C. Wheeler. Wentworth wrote extensively about women’s rights and the women’s suffrage movement. Haldeman-Julius, writing then as Emanuel Julius, covered socialist news and wrote profiles and book reviews. Wagner was the primary illustrator for the magazine through 1914. Mila Tupper Maynard, a Unitarian minister and social reformer, was the publication’s drama critic.

While the magazine published socialist dogma, particularly collective socialism, it did not shy away from other socialist themes, such as promoting individualism. Wagner, for example, who studied art in Paris and was the art director of the intellectual New York magazine The Criterion in the late 1890s, advocated that artists and writers break the bonds of capitalism by relying less on wealthy benefactors and focusing more on their art. The magazine also promoted labor-related films, such as Wolfe's "From Dusk to Dawn" (1913). The magazine advocated using film, produced and directed by labor leaders instead of movie studios, to attract moviegoers to socialism and as an instructive tool on union organizing and staging strikes.

Not all socialists were enamored by the publication. Writer Jack London, an ardent socialist during the early part of the 20th century, criticized Emanuel Haldeman-Julius’ profile of him as amateurish and inaccurate.

The Western Comrade’s primary purpose, at least during its first year of publication, was to promote Harriman’s Llano del Rio colony at the edge of the Mojave Desert in the Antelope Valley. The cooperative featured a hotel, bungalows, a communal kitchen and meeting room. Water was drawn from Big Rock Creek. Investors could purchases shares in the cooperative for $2,000. Although the colony, which consisted of about 150 families in 1915, claimed to be socialist, a board of directors ruled the cooperative, often with little input from its residents. Llano del Rio failed in 1918.

Its coverage of Llano del Rio aside, The Western Comrade was instructive in socialist principles with coverage on how to produce socialist-themed movies, working within the California state legislature and organizing unions and strikes.

By June 1914, most of the original editors left the magazine with Haldeman-Julius becoming the magazine’s editor and Wolfe its associate editor. The magazine also moved its headquarters to 924 Higgins Building, Los Angeles. Two months later Harriman became the managing editor. Under Harriman, the magazine attracted prominent names in leftist politics including Max Eastman, Clarence Darrow and Upton Sinclair.

With the failure of the Llano del Rio colony and Harriman’s attempt to resurrect it by moving the cooperative to Louisiana, the magazine ceased publication in 1918. In May, Harriman changed the masthead to The Internationalist, but the magazine folded in June.
