= Henry E. Stubbs =

American clergyman and California Congressman (1881–1937)

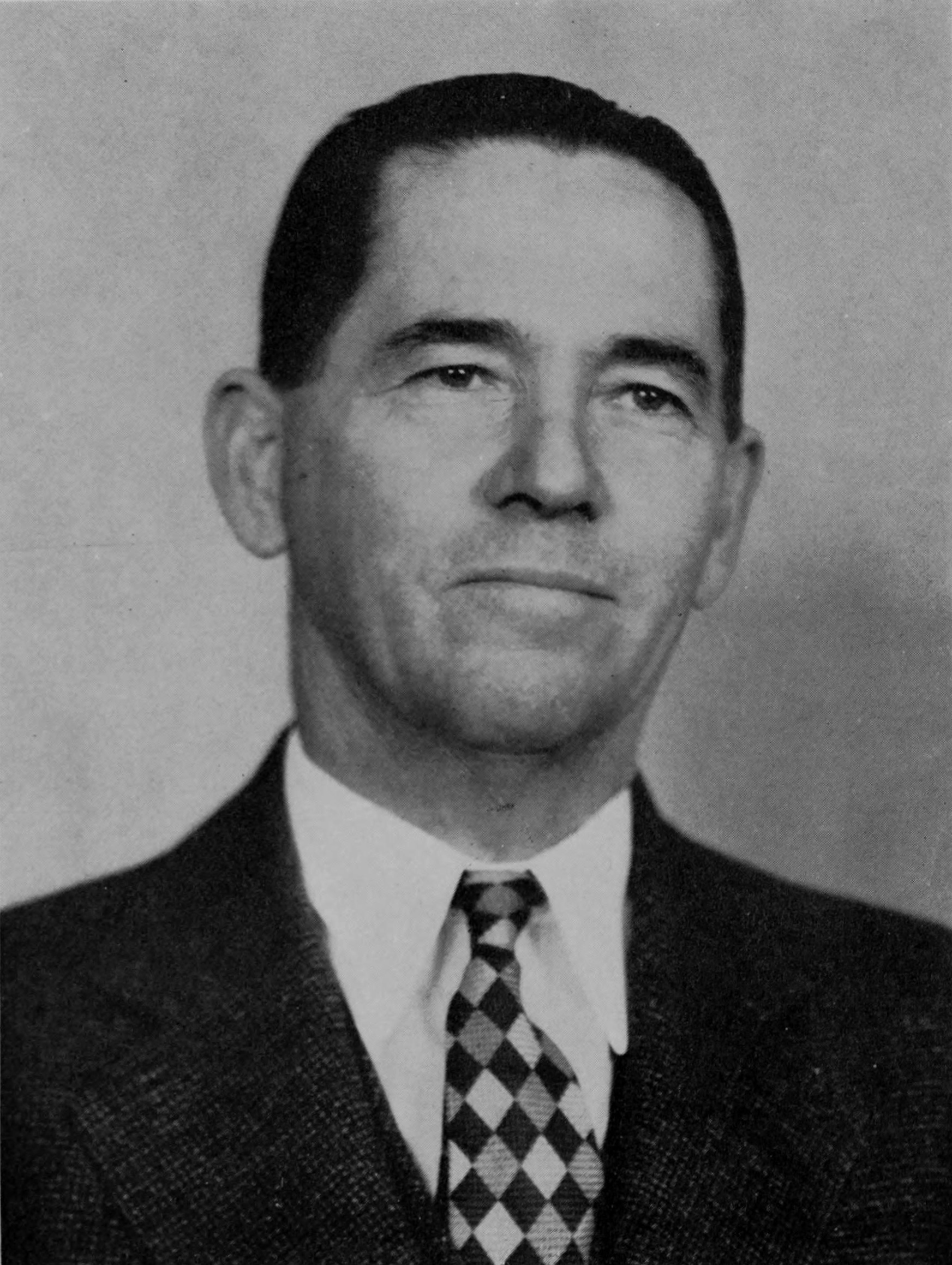

Member of the U.S. House of Representatives from California's 10th district
- In office March 4, 1933 – February 28, 1937
- Preceded by: Joe Crail
- Succeeded by: Alfred J. Elliott

Personal details
- Born: Henry Elbert Stubbs; March 4, 1881 Nampa, Coleman County, Texas
- Died: February 28, 1937 (aged 55) Washington, D.C.
- Resting place: Santa Maria Cemetery, Santa Maria, California
- Party: Democratic
- Education: Phillips University

Henry Elbert Stubbs (March 4, 1881 – February 28, 1937) was an American clergyman and politician who served two terms as a U.S. representative from California from 1933 to 1937.

== Biography ==
Born in Nampa, Coleman County, Texas, Stubbs attended the public schools in Groesbeck, Texas, and Phillips University in Enid, Oklahoma.

=== Clergy ===
He was ordained a minister of the Christian Church (Disciples of Christ) in 1911, and served as pastor of the Christian Church in Frederick, Oklahoma, from 1911 to 1914 and from 1918 to 1921, and in Kingfisher, Oklahoma from 1914 to 1917.

Stubbs moved to California in 1921, and served as pastor of the Christian Church in Tulare, California, from 1921 to 1923 and of the Santa Maria (California) Christian Church from 1923 until elected to Congress.

=== Congress ===
Stubbs was elected as a Democrat to the 73rd, 74th, and 75th Congresses, and served from March 4, 1933, until his death.

=== Death and burial ===
Stubbs died in Washington, D.C. on February 28, 1937. He was interred in Santa Maria Cemetery, Santa Maria, California.

== Electoral history ==
1932 United States House of Representatives elections
Party	Candidate	Votes	%
Democratic	Henry E. Stubbs	50,390	55.3
Republican	Arthur S. Crites	40,794	44.7
Total votes		91,184	100.0
Turnout			
Democratic gain from Republican			

1934 United States House of Representatives elections
Party	Candidate	Votes	%
Democratic	Henry E. Stubbs (Incumbent)	68,475	64.4
Republican	George R. Bliss	37,860	35.6
Total votes		106,335	100.0
Turnout			
Democratic hold			

1936 United States House of Representatives elections
Party	Candidate	Votes	%
Democratic	Henry E. Stubbs (Incumbent)	72,476	69.6
Republican	George R. Bliss	31,700	30.4
Total votes		104,176	100.0
Turnout			
Democratic hold			

== See also ==
- List of members of the United States Congress who died in office (1900–1949)

U.S. House of Representatives
Preceded by William E. Evans	Member of the U.S. House of Representatives from California's 10th congressional district 1933–1937	Succeeded by Alfred J. Elliott
