= California's 10th congressional district =

U.S. House district for California

Coordinates: 37.6°N 121.0°W

- Interactive map of district boundaries
- Representative: Mark DeSaulnier; D–Concord
- Population (2025): 766,345
- Median household income: $159,546
- Ethnicity: 47.7% White; 22.2% Asian; 18.3% Hispanic; 6.1% Two or more races; 4.6% Black; 1.2% other
- Cook PVI: D+18

California's 10th congressional district is a congressional district in the U.S. state of California. It is currently represented by Mark DeSaulnier, a Democrat from Concord.

Since redistricting in 2022, the 10th district is mostly in Contra Costa County with a small portion in Alameda County. It includes the cities of Concord, Walnut Creek, Danville, San Ramon, Brentwood, and southern Antioch in Contra Costa County, and eastern Dublin in Alameda County. It was essentially the successor of the old 11th district.

The district previously included all of Stanislaus County and part of San Joaquin County. It was centered on Modesto. Cities in the district included Oakdale, Manteca, Modesto, Tracy, and Turlock.

== History ==
=== Until 2012 ===
Prior to redistricting by the California Citizens Redistricting Commission going into effect in 2012, the 10th district stretched from Livermore to Dixon and the outskirts of Vacaville. It consisted of portions of Alameda, Contra Costa, Sacramento, and Solano Counties.

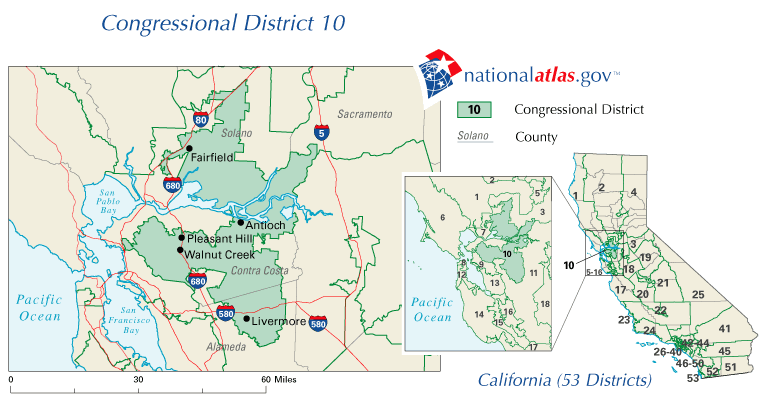
District borders, 2002-2012.

Following redistricting in 1992, the 10th district was based in the East Bay, and included parts of Alameda and Contra Costa counties. It received national attention in 1996 when Democrat Ellen Tauscher defeated incumbent Republican Bill Baker in what was considered an upset.

In the 2002 redistricting of California, all seats were made safe for the parties of incumbent officeholders. The district boundaries were extended to include parts of Solano County, southwestern Sacramento County, eastern Contra Costa County and El Cerrito in western Contra Costa County. Although much of the suburban Tri-Valley region was shifted to the 11th congressional district, the city of Livermore remained in the 10th at Tauscher's request (as a member of the U.S. House Committee on Energy and Commerce, she had some oversight responsibilities over the U.S. Department of Energy, and hence indirectly of Lawrence Livermore National Laboratory).

On June 26, 2009, Tauscher resigned her seat to be sworn in as Undersecretary of State for Arms Control and International Security. In the ensuing special election held on November 3, 2009, former Democratic Lieutenant Governor John Garamendi won the seat over Republican David Harmer 53.0% to 42.7%. Immediately following redistricting, Garamendi successfully ran for re-election in California's 3rd congressional district, which shares many municipalities with the 2002 version of the 10th district (e.g. Vacaville and Fairfield), but lies significantly northwest of the current 10th district.

=== 2012 – 2022 ===
The 10th congressional district starting with the election of 2012 and lasting through the election of 2020 included all of Stanislaus County (including Ceres, Oakdale, Modesto, Riverbank, and Turlock) and the southern portion of San Joaquin County (including Tracy and Manteca).

This went into effect in 2012, as the result of redistricting by the California Citizens Redistricting Commission. This version of the 10th included much of the core of the old 18th district (Modesto, Ceres, and the southwestern half of Stanislaus County), though the 18th also included a substantial portion of Stockton. It also shares much of the northwestern portion of the old 19th district (Turlock, Riverbank, Oakdale, and the rest of northeastern Stanislaus County).

Republican Jeff Denham transferred from the prior 19th district to the newer 10th. He held it for three terms until being defeated in 2018 by Democrat Josh Harder, who won reelection in 2020.

=== After 2022 ===
The 10th district was redrawn in time for the 2022 election, being divided up between California's 5th congressional district (which now includes eastern portions of Modesto and eastern portions of Turlock), California's 9th congressional district (which is centered on Stockton, California and includes Tracy), and California's 13th congressional district (which includes western Modesto and western Turlock) . The 2022 10th district incumbent Josh Harder was reelected and moved to the new version of California's 9th congressional district. The district has been represented since Jan 3, 2023 by Mark DeSaulnier.

=== Voter registration statistics ===
The California secretary of state publishes reports on California voter registration on a regular basis. Before the 2018 primary election, they published a report dating May 21, 2018.

Date	Democratic	Republican	American Independent	Green	Libertarian	No Party Preference
May 21, 2018	127,878	117,900	10,011	959	2,484	70,251

== Recent election results from statewide races ==
=== 2023–2027 boundaries ===
Year	Office	Results
2008	President	Obama 64% - 35%
2010	Governor	Brown 55% - 42%
2010	Lt. Governor	Newsom 54% - 40%
2010	Secretary of State	Bowen 55% - 39%
2010	Attorney General	Harris 47% - 46%
2010	Treasurer	Lockyer 59% - 35%
2010	Controller	Chiang 55% - 37%
2012	President	Obama 62% - 38%
2014	Governor	Brown 64% - 36%
2016	President	Clinton 65% - 29%
2018	Governor	Newsom 64% - 36%
2018	Attorney General	Becerra 65% - 35%
2020	President	Biden 69% - 29%
2022	Senate (Reg.)	Padilla 66% - 34%
2022	Governor	Newsom 65% - 35%
2022	Lt. Governor	Kounalakis 66% - 34%
2022	Secretary of State	Weber 65% - 35%
2022	Attorney General	Bonta 64% - 36%
2022	Treasurer	Ma 64% - 36%
2022	Controller	Cohen 59% - 41%
2024	President	Harris 65% - 31%
2024	Senate (Reg.)	Schiff 64% - 36%

=== 2027–2033 boundaries ===
Year	Office	Results
2008	President	Obama 64% - 35%
2010	Governor	Brown 55% - 42%
2010	Lt. Governor	Newsom 54% - 40%
2010	Secretary of State	Bowen 55% - 39%
2010	Attorney General	Harris 47% - 46%
2010	Treasurer	Lockyer 59% - 35%
2010	Controller	Chiang 55% - 37%
2012	President	Obama 62% - 38%
2014	Governor	Brown 64% - 36%
2016	President	Clinton 65% - 29%
2018	Governor	Newsom 64% - 36%
2018	Attorney General	Becerra 65% - 35%
2020	President	Biden 69% - 29%
2022	Senate (Reg.)	Padilla 66% - 34%
2022	Governor	Newsom 65% - 35%
2022	Lt. Governor	Kounalakis 66% - 34%
2022	Secretary of State	Weber 65% - 35%
2022	Attorney General	Bonta 64% - 36%
2022	Treasurer	Ma 64% - 36%
2022	Controller	Cohen 59% - 41%
2024	President	Harris 65% - 31%
2024	Senate (Reg.)	Schiff 64% - 36%

== Composition ==
FIPS County Code	County	Seat	Population
1	Alameda	Oakland	1,622,188
13	Contra Costa	Martinez	1,161,413

Under the 2020 redistricting, California's 10th congressional district is located in the San Francisco Bay Area, encompassing most of Contra Costa County, and part of Alameda County. The area in Contra Costa County includes the south sides of the cities of Antioch and Martinez; the cities of Concord, Brentwood, Oakley, Pleasant Hill, Clayton, Walnut Creek, Lafayette, Orinda, and San Ramon; the towns of Danville and Moraga; and the census-designated places Norris Canyon, Camino Tassajara, Blackhawk, Diablo, Alamo, Castle Hill, Saranap, Acalanes Ridge, San Miguel, North Gate, Shell Ridge, Contra Costa Centre, Reliez Valley, Alhambra Valley, Mountain View, Vine Hill, Pacheco, Clyde, Knightsen, and Bethel Island. The area in Alameda County includes the eastern portion of the city of Dublin.

Contra Costa County is split between this district, the 8th district, and the 9th district. The northern border is partitioned by Grizzly Peak Blvd, Seaview Trail, Camino Pablo, Bear Creek Rd, San Pablo Creek, Bear Creek, Brianes Reservoir, Burlington Northern Santa Fe, Highway 4, Alhambra Ave, Pacheco Blvd, Grandview Ave, Central Ave, Imhoff Dr, Bares Ave, Mount Diablo Creek, Union Pacific, Contra Costa Canal, 4WD Rd, Bailey Rd, James Donlon Blvd, Cambridge Dr, Reseda Way, S Royal links Cir, Carpinteria Dr, Barmouth Dr, Hillcrest Ave, Highway 4, and Highway 160. The western border is partitioned by Old River, Italian Slough, Western Farms Ranch Rd, Rankin Rd, Highway J14, Byron Hot Springs Rd, Camino Diablo, Kellogg Creek, Sellers Ave, Brentwood Blvd, Alloro Dr, Ghiggeri Dr, Emilio Dr, Guthrie Ln, Balfour Rd, Chestnut St, Byron Highway, Orwood Rd, Burlington Northern Santa Fe, Werner Dredger Cut, and Rock Slough.

Alameda County is split between this district and the 12th, 14th, and 17th districts. They are partitioned by Sinclair Freeway, Amador Valley Blvd, Emerald Ave, Tamarack Dr, Brighton Dr, Ione Way, Newcastle Ln, Dougherty Rd, Highway 580, Lembert Hills Dr.

=== Cities and CDPs with 10,000 or more people ===
- Concord – 125,410
- Antioch – 115,291
- San Ramon – 84,605
- Dublin – 72,589
- Walnut Creek – 70,127
- Brentwood – 64,292
- Danville – 43,582
- Oakley – 43,357
- Martinez – 37,287
- Pleasant Hill – 34,613
- Lafayette – 25,391
- Orinda – 19,514
- Moraga – 16,870
- Alamo – 15,314
- Clayton – 11,070

=== 2,500 – 10,000 people ===
- Blackhawk – 9,647
- Contra Costa Centre – 6,808
- Saranap – 5,202
- Camino Tassajara – 4,951
- Pacheco – 4,183
- Vine Hill – 3,761
- San Miguel – 3,172
- Reliez Valley – 3,101

== List of members representing the district ==
Member	Party	Dates	Cong ress	Electoral history	Counties
District created March 4, 1913
William Stephens (Los Angeles)	Progressive	March 4, 1913 – July 22, 1916	63rd 64th	Redistricted from the 7th district and re-elected in 1912. Re-elected in 1914. Resigned to become Lieutenant Governor of California.	1913–1933; Los Angeles (Los Angeles)
Vacant		July 22, 1916 – November 7, 1916	64th		1913–1933; Los Angeles (Los Angeles)
Henry S. Benedict (Los Angeles)	Republican	November 7, 1916 – March 3, 1917	64th	Elected to finish Stephens's term. Ran for the next term as a Progressive but withdrew.	1913–1933; Los Angeles (Los Angeles)
Henry Z. Osborne (Los Angeles)	Republican	March 4, 1917 – February 8, 1923	65th 66th 67th	Elected in 1916. Re-elected in 1918. Re-elected in 1920. Re-elected in 1922 but died.	1913–1933; Los Angeles (Los Angeles)
Vacant		February 8, 1923 – May 1, 1923	67th 68th		1913–1933; Los Angeles (Los Angeles)
John D. Fredericks (Los Angeles)	Republican	May 1, 1923 – March 3, 1927	68th 69th	Elected to finish Osborne's term. Re-elected in 1924. Retired.	1913–1933; Los Angeles (Los Angeles)
Joe Crail (Los Angeles)	Republican	March 4, 1927 – March 3, 1933	70th 71st 72nd	Elected in 1926. Re-elected in 1928. Re-elected in 1930. Retired.	1913–1933; Los Angeles (Los Angeles)
Henry E. Stubbs (Santa Maria)	Democratic	March 4, 1933 – February 28, 1937	73rd 74th 75th	Elected in 1932. Re-elected in 1934. Re-elected in 1936. Died.	1933–1943; Kern, San Luis Obispo, Santa Barbara, Tulare, Ventura
Vacant		February 28, 1937 – May 4, 1937	75th		1933–1943; Kern, San Luis Obispo, Santa Barbara, Tulare, Ventura
Alfred J. Elliott (Tulare)	Democratic	May 4, 1937 – January 3, 1949	75th 76th 77th 78th 79th 80th	Elected to finish Stubbs's term. Re-elected in 1938. Re-elected in 1940. Re-elected in 1942. Re-elected in 1944. Re-elected in 1946. Retired.	1933–1943; Kern, San Luis Obispo, Santa Barbara, Tulare, Ventura
Alfred J. Elliott (Tulare)	Democratic	May 4, 1937 – January 3, 1949	75th 76th 77th 78th 79th 80th	Elected to finish Stubbs's term. Re-elected in 1938. Re-elected in 1940. Re-elected in 1942. Re-elected in 1944. Re-elected in 1946. Retired.	1943–1953; Kern, Kings, Tulare
Thomas H. Werdel (Bakersfield)	Republican	January 3, 1949 – January 3, 1953	81st 82nd	Elected in 1948. Re-elected in 1950. Redistricted to the 14th district and lost re-election.	1943–1953; Kern, Kings, Tulare
Charles Gubser (Gilroy)	Republican	January 3, 1953 – December 31, 1974	83rd 84th 85th 86th 87th 88th 89th 90th 91st 92nd 93rd	Elected in 1952. Re-elected in 1954. Re-elected in 1956. Re-elected in 1958. Re-elected in 1960. Re-elected in 1962. Re-elected in 1964. Re-elected in 1966. Re-elected in 1968. Re-elected in 1970. Re-elected in 1972. Retired and resigned.	1953–1963; San Benito, Santa Clara, Santa Cruz
Charles Gubser (Gilroy)	Republican	January 3, 1953 – December 31, 1974	83rd 84th 85th 86th 87th 88th 89th 90th 91st 92nd 93rd	Elected in 1952. Re-elected in 1954. Re-elected in 1956. Re-elected in 1958. Re-elected in 1960. Re-elected in 1962. Re-elected in 1964. Re-elected in 1966. Re-elected in 1968. Re-elected in 1970. Re-elected in 1972. Retired and resigned.	1963–1967; San Benito, western Santa Clara
Charles Gubser (Gilroy)	Republican	January 3, 1953 – December 31, 1974	83rd 84th 85th 86th 87th 88th 89th 90th 91st 92nd 93rd	Elected in 1952. Re-elected in 1954. Re-elected in 1956. Re-elected in 1958. Re-elected in 1960. Re-elected in 1962. Re-elected in 1964. Re-elected in 1966. Re-elected in 1968. Re-elected in 1970. Re-elected in 1972. Retired and resigned.	1967–1973; Western Santa Clara
Charles Gubser (Gilroy)	Republican	January 3, 1953 – December 31, 1974	83rd 84th 85th 86th 87th 88th 89th 90th 91st 92nd 93rd	Elected in 1952. Re-elected in 1954. Re-elected in 1956. Re-elected in 1958. Re-elected in 1960. Re-elected in 1962. Re-elected in 1964. Re-elected in 1966. Re-elected in 1968. Re-elected in 1970. Re-elected in 1972. Retired and resigned.	1973–1975; Most of Santa Clara
Vacant		December 31, 1974 – January 3, 1975	93rd		1973–1975; Most of Santa Clara
Don Edwards (San Jose)	Democratic	January 3, 1975 – January 3, 1993	94th 95th 96th 97th 98th 99th 100th 101st 102nd	Redistricted from the 9th district and re-elected in 1974. Re-elected in 1976. Re-elected in 1978. Re-elected in 1980. Re-elected in 1982. Re-elected in 1984. Re-elected in 1986. Re-elected in 1988. Re-elected in 1990. Redistricted to the 16th district.	1975–1983; Southwest Alameda, northern Santa Clara
Don Edwards (San Jose)	Democratic	January 3, 1975 – January 3, 1993	94th 95th 96th 97th 98th 99th 100th 101st 102nd	Redistricted from the 9th district and re-elected in 1974. Re-elected in 1976. Re-elected in 1978. Re-elected in 1980. Re-elected in 1982. Re-elected in 1984. Re-elected in 1986. Re-elected in 1988. Re-elected in 1990. Redistricted to the 16th district.	1983–1993; SW Alameda, Santa Clara (eastern San Jose)
Bill Baker (Danville)	Republican	January 3, 1993 – January 3, 1997	103rd 104th	Elected in 1992. Re-elected in 1994. Lost re-election.	1993–2003; Eastern Alameda, eastern Contra Costa
Ellen Tauscher (Alamo)	Democratic	January 3, 1997 – June 26, 2009	105th 106th 107th 108th 109th 110th 111th	Elected in 1996. Re-elected in 1998. Re-elected in 2000. Re-elected in 2002. Re-elected in 2004. Re-elected in 2006. Re-elected in 2008. Resigned to become Undersecretary of State for Arms Control and International Security.	1993–2003; Eastern Alameda, eastern Contra Costa
Ellen Tauscher (Alamo)	Democratic	January 3, 1997 – June 26, 2009	105th 106th 107th 108th 109th 110th 111th	Elected in 1996. Re-elected in 1998. Re-elected in 2000. Re-elected in 2002. Re-elected in 2004. Re-elected in 2006. Re-elected in 2008. Resigned to become Undersecretary of State for Arms Control and International Security.	2003–2013 Southeast Alameda, most of Contra Costa, southwest Sacramento, most of Solano
Vacant		June 26, 2009 – November 3, 2009	111th		2003–2013 Southeast Alameda, most of Contra Costa, southwest Sacramento, most of Solano
John Garamendi (Walnut Grove)	Democratic	November 3, 2009 – January 3, 2013	111th 112th	Elected to finish Tauscher's term. Re-elected in 2010. Redistricted to the 3rd district.	2003–2013 Southeast Alameda, most of Contra Costa, southwest Sacramento, most of Solano
Jeff Denham (Turlock)	Republican	January 3, 2013 – January 3, 2019	113th 114th 115th	Redistricted from the 19th district and re-elected in 2012. Re-elected in 2014. Re-elected in 2016. Lost re-election.	2013–2023 Central Valley including Modesto and Tracy
Josh Harder (Turlock)	Democratic	January 3, 2019 – January 3, 2023	116th 117th	Elected in 2018. Re-elected in 2020. Redistricted to the 9th district.	2013–2023 Central Valley including Modesto and Tracy
Mark DeSaulnier (Concord)	Democratic	January 3, 2023 – present	118th 119th	Redistricted from the 11th district and re-elected in 2022. Re-elected in 2024. Re-elected in 2026.	2023–present Eastern San Francisco Bay Area, including part of Alameda and most of Contra Costa

== Election results for representatives ==
=== 1912 ===
1912 United States House of Representatives elections
Party	Candidate	Votes	%
Progressive	William Stephens (Incumbent)	43,637	53.4
Democratic	George Ringo	17,890	21.9
Socialist	Fred C. Wheeler	17,126	21.0
Prohibition	Emory D. Martindale	2,995	3.7
Total votes		81,648	100.0
Turnout			
Progressive hold			

=== 1914 ===
1914 United States House of Representatives elections
Party	Candidate	Votes	%
Progressive	William Stephens (Incumbent)	44,141	38.4
Republican	Henry Z. Osborne	33,172	28.9
Democratic	Nathan Newby	17,810	15.5
Socialist	Ralph L. Criswell	14,900	13.0
Prohibition	Henry Clay Needham	4,903	4.3
Total votes		70,926	100.0
Turnout			
Progressive hold			

=== 1916 (Special) ===
1916 10th congressional district special election
Party	Candidate	Votes	%
Progressive	Henry S. Benedict (write-in)	19,062	62.82
Independent	Joy Clark (write-in)	7,149	23.59
Prohibition	Henry Clay Needham (write-in)	1,310	4.32
Unknown	George Clark (write-in)	1,073	3.54
Socialist	James H. Ryckman (write-in)	911	3.01
Democratic	Rufus V. Bowden (write-in)	553	1.83
Unknown	John C. Wray (write-in)	270	0.89
Total votes		30,328	100.0
Turnout			
Progressive hold			

=== 1916 ===
1916 United States House of Representatives elections
Party	Candidate	Votes	%
Republican	Henry Z. Osborne	63,913	49.5
Democratic	Rufus W. Bowden	33,225	25.7
Progressive	Henry Stanley Benedict	14,305	11.1
Socialist	James H. Ryckman	9,000	7.0
Prohibition	Henry Clay Needham	8,781	6.8
Total votes		129,224	100.0
Turnout			
Republican hold			

=== 1918 ===
1918 United States House of Representatives elections
Party	Candidate	Votes	%
Republican	Henry Z. Osborne (Incumbent)	72,773	88.2
Socialist	James H. Ryckman	9,725	11.8
Total votes		82,498	100.0
Turnout			
Republican hold			

=== 1920 ===
1920 United States House of Representatives elections
Party	Candidate	Votes	%
Republican	Henry Z. Osborne (Incumbent)	97,469	82.7
Socialist	Upton Sinclair	20,439	17.3
Total votes		117,908	100.0
Turnout			
Republican hold			

=== 1922 ===
1922 United States House of Representatives elections
Party	Candidate	Votes	%
Republican	Henry Z. Osborne (Incumbent)	98,739	100.0
Turnout		98,739	100
Republican hold			

=== 1923 (Special) ===
Republican John D. Fredericks won the special election to replace fellow Republican Henry Z. Osborne, who died in office.

1923 10th congressional district special election
Party	Candidate	Votes	%
Republican	John D. Fredericks	28,084	36.16
Republican	Henry Z. Osborne Jr.	18,103	23.31
Democratic	Lloy Galphin	13,748	17.70
Republican	Alfred L. Bartlett	8,857	11.40
Republican	Frank A. McDonald	5,884	7.58
Prohibition	John C. Bell	1,875	2.41
Independent	Upton Sinclair	1,113	1.43
Total votes		77,664	100
Turnout			
Republican hold			

=== 1924 ===
1924 United States House of Representatives elections
Party	Candidate	Votes	%
Republican	John D. Fredericks (Incumbent)	133,780	62.3
Democratic	Robert W. Richardson	80,870	37.7
Total votes		214,650	100.0
Turnout			
Republican hold			

=== 1926 ===
1926 United States House of Representatives elections
Party	Candidate	Votes	%
Republican	Joe Crail (Incumbent)	144,677	86.8
Socialist	N. Jackson Wright	21,997	13.2
Total votes		166,674	100.0
Turnout			
Republican hold			

=== 1928 ===
1928 United States House of Representatives elections
Party	Candidate	Votes	%
Republican	Joe Crail (Incumbent)	301,028	93.9
Democratic	Harry Sherr	19,659	6.1
Total votes		320,687	100.0
Turnout			
Republican hold			

=== 1930 ===
1930 United States House of Representatives elections
Party	Candidate	Votes	%
Republican	Joe Crail (Incumbent)	162,502	75.0
Democratic	John F. Dockweiler	54,231	25.0
Total votes		216,733	100
Turnout			
Republican hold			

=== 1932 ===
1932 United States House of Representatives elections
Party	Candidate	Votes	%
Democratic	Henry E. Stubbs	50,390	55.3
Republican	Arthur S. Crites	40,794	44.7
Total votes		91,184	100.0
Turnout			
Democratic gain from Republican			

=== 1934 ===
1934 United States House of Representatives elections
Party	Candidate	Votes	%
Democratic	Henry E. Stubbs (Incumbent)	68,475	64.4
Republican	George R. Bliss	37,860	35.6
Total votes		106,335	100.0
Turnout			
Democratic hold			

=== 1936 ===
1936 United States House of Representatives elections
Party	Candidate	Votes	%
Democratic	Henry E. Stubbs (Incumbent)	72,476	69.6
Republican	George R. Bliss	31,700	30.4
Total votes		104,176	100.0
Turnout			
Democratic hold			

=== 1937 (Special) ===
Democrat Alfred J. Elliott won the special election to replace fellow Democrat Henry E. Stubbs, who died in office.

1937 10th congressional district special election
Party	Candidate	Votes	%
Democratic	Alfred J. Elliott	22,321	48.91
Republican	Harry A. Hopkins	17,678	38.74
California Progressive Party	Al Sessions	5,638	12.35
Total votes		45,637	100
Turnout			
Democratic hold			

=== 1938 ===
1938 United States House of Representatives elections
Party	Candidate	Votes	%
Democratic	Alfred J. Elliott (Incumbent)	84,791	67.3
Republican	F. Fred Hoelscher	41,194	32.7
Total votes		125,985	100.0
Turnout			
Democratic hold			

=== 1940 ===
1940 United States House of Representatives elections
Party	Candidate	Votes	%
Democratic	Alfred J. Elliott (Incumbent)	125,845	97.0
Communist	Louretta Adams	3,826	3.0
Total votes		129,671	100
Turnout			
Democratic hold			

=== 1942 ===
1942 United States House of Representatives elections
Party	Candidate	Votes	%
Democratic	Alfred J. Elliott (Incumbent)	43,864	100.0
Turnout		43,864	100
Democratic hold			

=== 1944 ===
1944 United States House of Representatives elections
Party	Candidate	Votes	%
Democratic	Alfred J. Elliott (Incumbent)	60,001	100.0
Turnout		60,001	100
Democratic hold			

=== 1946 ===
1946 United States House of Representatives elections
Party	Candidate	Votes	%
Democratic	Alfred J. Elliott (Incumbent)	51,843	100.0
Turnout			100
Democratic hold			

=== 1948 ===
1948 United States House of Representatives elections
Party	Candidate	Votes	%
Republican	Thomas H. Werdel	67,448	71.3
Progressive	Sam James Miller	27,168	28.7
Total votes		94,616	100.0
Turnout			
Republican gain from Democratic			

=== 1950 ===
1950 United States House of Representatives elections
Party	Candidate	Votes	%
Republican	Thomas H. Werdel (Incumbent)	59,313	53.6
Democratic	Harlan Hagen	51,409	46.4
Total votes		110,722	100.0
Turnout			
Republican hold			

=== 1952 ===
1952 United States House of Representatives elections
Party	Candidate	Votes	%
Republican	Charles S. Gubser	106,375	59.2
Democratic	Arthur L. Johnson	70,271	39.1
Progressive	Betsey K. Fisher	2,939	1.7
Total votes		179,585	100.0
Turnout			
Republican hold			

=== 1954 ===
1954 United States House of Representatives elections
Party	Candidate	Votes	%
Republican	Charles S. Gubser (Incumbent)	94,418	61.2
Democratic	Paul V. Birmingham	59,843	38.8
Total votes		154,261	100.0
Turnout			
Republican hold			

=== 1956 ===
1956 United States House of Representatives elections
Party	Candidate	Votes	%
Republican	Charles S. Gubser (Incumbent)	128,891	60.7
Democratic	William H. Vatcher	83,586	39.3
Total votes		212,477	100.0
Turnout			
Republican hold			

=== 1958 ===
1958 United States House of Representatives elections
Party	Candidate	Votes	%
Republican	Charles S. Gubser (Incumbent)	118,715	54.6
Democratic	Russell B. Bryan	98,894	45.4
Total votes		217,609	100.0
Turnout			
Republican hold			

=== 1960 ===
1960 United States House of Representatives elections
Party	Candidate	Votes	%
Republican	Charles S. Gubser (Incumbent)	170,063	58.9
Democratic	Russell B. Bryan	118,520	41.1
Total votes		288,583	100.0
Turnout			
Republican hold			

=== 1962 ===
1962 United States House of Representatives elections
Party	Candidate	Votes	%
Republican	Charles S. Gubser (Incumbent)	106,419	57.4
Democratic	James P. Thurber Jr.	68,885	42.6
Total votes		175,304	100.0
Turnout			
Republican hold			

=== 1964 ===
1964 United States House of Representatives elections
Party	Candidate	Votes	%
Republican	Charles S. Gubser (Incumbent)	151,027	63.1
Democratic	E. Day Carman	88,240	36.9
Total votes		239,267	100.0
Turnout			
Republican hold			

=== 1966 ===
1966 United States House of Representatives elections
Party	Candidate	Votes	%
Republican	Charles S. Gubser (Incumbent)	156,549	69.1
Democratic	George Leppert	70,013	30.9
Total votes		226,562	100.0
Turnout			
Republican hold			

=== 1968 ===
1968 United States House of Representatives elections
Party	Candidate	Votes	%
Republican	Charles S. Gubser (Incumbent)	160,204	67.3
Democratic	Grayson S. Taketa	73,530	30.9
Peace and Freedom	Martin L. Primach	4,276	1.8
Total votes		238,010	100.0
Turnout			
Republican hold			

=== 1970 ===
1970 United States House of Representatives elections
Party	Candidate	Votes	%
Republican	Charles S. Gubser (Incumbent)	135,864	62.0
Democratic	Stuart. D. McLean	80,530	36.8
American Independent	Joyce W. Stancliffe	2,651	1.2
Total votes		219,045	100.0
Turnout			
Republican hold			

=== 1972 ===
1972 United States House of Representatives elections
Party	Candidate	Votes	%
Republican	Charles S. Gubser (Incumbent)	139,850	64.6
Democratic	B. Frank Gillette	76,597	35.4
Total votes		216,447	100.0
Turnout			
Republican hold			

=== 1974 ===
1974 United States House of Representatives elections
Party	Candidate	Votes	%
Democratic	Don Edwards (Incumbent)	86,014	77.0
Republican	Herb Smith	25,678	23.0
Total votes		111,692	100
Turnout			
Democratic gain from Republican			

=== 1976 ===
1976 United States House of Representatives elections
Party	Candidate	Votes	%
Democratic	Don Edwards (Incumbent)	111,992	72.0
Republican	Herb Smith	38,088	24.5
American Independent	Edmon V. Kaiser	5,363	3.5
Total votes		155,443	100.0
Turnout			
Democratic hold			

=== 1978 ===
1978 United States House of Representatives elections
Party	Candidate	Votes	%
Democratic	Don Edwards (Incumbent)	84,488	67.1
Republican	Rudy Hansen	41,374	32.9
Total votes		125,862	100.0
Turnout			
Democratic hold			

=== 1980 ===
1980 United States House of Representatives elections
Party	Candidate	Votes	%
Democratic	Don Edwards (Incumbent)	102,231	62.1
Republican	Joseph M. Lutton	45,987	27.9
Libertarian	Joseph Fuhrig	11,904	7.2
American Independent	Edmon V. Kaiser	4,421	2.7
Total votes		164,543	100.0
Turnout			
Democratic hold			

=== 1982 ===
1982 United States House of Representatives elections
Party	Candidate	Votes	%
Democratic	Don Edwards (Incumbent)	77,263	62.7
Republican	Bob Herriott	41,506	33.7
Libertarian	Dale Burrow	2,403	1.9
American Independent	Edmon V. Kaiser	2,109	1.7
Total votes		123,281	100.0
Turnout			
Democratic hold			

=== 1984 ===
1984 United States House of Representatives elections
Party	Candidate	Votes	%
Democratic	Don Edwards (Incumbent)	102,469	62.4
Republican	Bob Herriott	56,256	34.3
Libertarian	Perr Cardestam	2,789	1.7
American Independent	Edmon V. Kaiser	2,663	1.6
Total votes		164,177	100.0
Turnout			
Democratic hold			

=== 1986 ===
1986 United States House of Representatives elections
Party	Candidate	Votes	%
Democratic	Don Edwards (Incumbent)	84,240	70.5
Republican	Michael R. La Crone	31,826	26.6
Libertarian	Perr Cardestam	1,797	1.5
Peace and Freedom	Bradley L. Mayer	1,701	1.4
Total votes		119,564	100.0
Turnout			
Democratic hold			

=== 1988 ===
1988 United States House of Representatives elections
Party	Candidate	Votes	%
Democratic	Don Edwards (Incumbent)	142,500	86.2
Libertarian	Kennita Watson	22,801	13.8
Total votes		165,301	100.0
Turnout			
Democratic hold			

=== 1990 ===
1990 United States House of Representatives elections
Party	Candidate	Votes	%
Democratic	Don Edwards (Incumbent)	81,875	62.7
Republican	Mark Patrosso	48,747	37.3
No party	James (write-in)	15	0.0
Total votes		130,637	100.0
Turnout			
Democratic hold			

=== 1992 ===
1992 United States House of Representatives elections
Party	Candidate	Votes	%
Republican	Bill Baker	145,702	52.0
Democratic	Wendell H. Williams	134,635	48.0
No party	Williams (write-in)	55	0.0
No party	Janloia (write-in)	37	0.0
Total votes		280,429	100
Turnout			
Republican win (new seat)			

=== 1994 ===
1994 United States House of Representatives elections
Party	Candidate	Votes	%
Republican	Bill Baker (Incumbent)	138,916	59.30
Democratic	Ellen Schwartz	90,523	38.65
Peace and Freedom	Craig W. Cooper	4,802	2.05
Total votes		234,241	100.0
Turnout			
Republican hold			

=== 1996 ===
1996 United States House of Representatives elections
Party	Candidate	Votes	%
Democratic	Ellen Tauscher	137,726	48.7
Republican	Bill Baker (Incumbent)	133,633	47.2
Reform	John Place	6,354	2.3
Natural Law	Valerie Janlois	3,047	1.0
Libertarian	Gregory Lyon	2,423	0.8
Total votes		283,183	100.0
Turnout			
Democratic gain from Republican			

=== 1998 ===
1998 United States House of Representatives elections
Party	Candidate	Votes	%
Democratic	Ellen Tauscher (Incumbent)	127,134	53.46
Republican	Charles Ball	103,299	43.44
Natural Law	Valerie Janlois	3,941	1.66
Reform	John Place	3,435	1.44
Total votes		237,809	100.0
Turnout			
Democratic hold			

=== 2000 ===
2000 United States House of Representatives elections in California
Party	Candidate	Votes	%
Democratic	Ellen Tauscher (Incumbent)	160,429	52.7
Republican	Claude B. Hutchison Jr.	134,863	44.2
Natural Law	Valerie Janlois	9,527	3.1
Total votes		304,819	100.0
Turnout			
Democratic hold			

=== 2002 ===
2002 United States House of Representatives elections in California
Party	Candidate	Votes	%
Democratic	Ellen Tauscher (Incumbent)	123,481	75.6
Libertarian	Sonia E. Alonso Harden	39,858	24.4
Total votes		163,339	100.0
Turnout			
Democratic hold			

=== 2004 ===
2004 United States House of Representatives elections in California
Party	Candidate	Votes	%
Democratic	Ellen Tauscher (Incumbent)	182,750	65.8
Republican	Jeff Ketelson	95,349	34.2
Total votes		278,099	100.0
Turnout			
Democratic hold			

=== 2006 ===
2006 United States House of Representatives elections in California
Party	Candidate	Votes	%
Democratic	Ellen Tauscher (Incumbent)	130,859	66.5
Republican	Darcy Linn	66,069	33.5
Republican	Jeff Ketelson (write-in)	50	0.0
Total votes		196,978	100.0
Turnout			
Democratic hold			

=== 2008 ===
2008 United States House of Representatives elections in California
Party	Candidate	Votes	%
Democratic	Ellen Tauscher (Incumbent)	192,226	65.2
Republican	Nicholas Gerber	91,877	31.1
Peace and Freedom	Eugene E. Ruyle	11,062	3.7
Total votes		295,165	100.0
Turnout			
Democratic hold			

=== 2009 (Special) ===
2009 California's 10th congressional district special election
Party	Candidate	Votes	%
Democratic	John Garamendi	72,817	52.85
Republican	David Harmer	59,017	42.83
Green	Jeremy Cloward	2,515	1.83
Peace and Freedom	Mary McIlroy	1,846	1.34
American Independent	Jerome Denham	1,591	1.15
Total votes		137,786	100.00
Turnout			35.33
Democratic hold			

=== 2010 ===
2010 United States House of Representatives elections in California
Party	Candidate	Votes	%
Democratic	John Garamendi (Incumbent)	137,578	58.9
Republican	Gary Clift	88,512	37.8
Green	Jeremy Cloward	7,716	3.3
Total votes		233,806	100.0
Turnout			
Democratic hold			

=== 2012 ===
2012 United States House of Representatives elections in California
Party	Candidate	Votes	%
Republican	Jeff Denham	110,265	52.7
Democratic	José M. Hernández	98,934	47.3
Total votes		209,199	100.0
Turnout			
Republican hold			

=== 2014 ===
2014 United States House of Representatives elections in California
Party	Candidate	Votes	%
Republican	Jeff Denham (Incumbent)	70,582	56%
Democratic	Michael Eggman	55,123	44%
Total votes		125,705	100.0%
Turnout			
Republican hold			

=== 2016 ===
2016 United States House of Representatives elections in California
Party	Candidate	Votes	%
Republican	Jeff Denham (Incumbent)	124,671	51.7
Democratic	Michael Eggman	116,470	48.3
Total votes		241,141	100.0
Republican hold			

=== 2018 ===
2018 United States House of Representatives elections in California
Primary election
Party	Candidate	Votes	%
Republican	Jeff Denham (Incumbent)	45,719	37.5
Democratic	Josh Harder	20,742	17.0
Republican	Ted D. Howze	17,723	14.6
Democratic	Michael Eggman	12,446	10.2
Democratic	Virginia Madueño	11,178	9.2
Democratic	Sue Zwahlen	9,945	8.2
Democratic	Michael J. "Mike" Barkley	2,904	2.4
Democratic	Dotty Nygard (withdrawn)	1,100	0.9
Total votes		121,757	100.0
General election
Democratic	Josh Harder	115,945	52.3
Republican	Jeff Denham (Incumbent)	105,955	47.7
Total votes		221,900	100.0
Democratic gain from Republican			

=== 2020 ===
2020 United States House of Representatives elections in California
Party	Candidate	Votes	%
Democratic	Josh Harder (Incumbent)	166,865	55.2
Republican	Ted Howze	135,629	44.8
Total votes		302,494	100.0
Democratic hold			

=== 2022 ===
2022 United States House of Representatives elections in California
Party	Candidate	Votes	%
Democratic	Mark DeSaulnier (Incumbent)	198,415	78.9
Green	Michael Ernest Kerr	52,965	21.1
Total votes		251,380	100.0
Democratic hold			

=== 2024 ===
2024 United States House of Representatives elections in California
Party	Candidate	Votes	%
Democratic	Mark DeSaulnier (Incumbent)	242,325	66.5
Republican	Katherine Piccinini	122,219	33.5
Total votes		364,544	100.0
Democratic hold			

== See also ==
- List of United States congressional districts
- California's congressional districts
