= Henry Z. Osborne =

American politician (1848–1923)

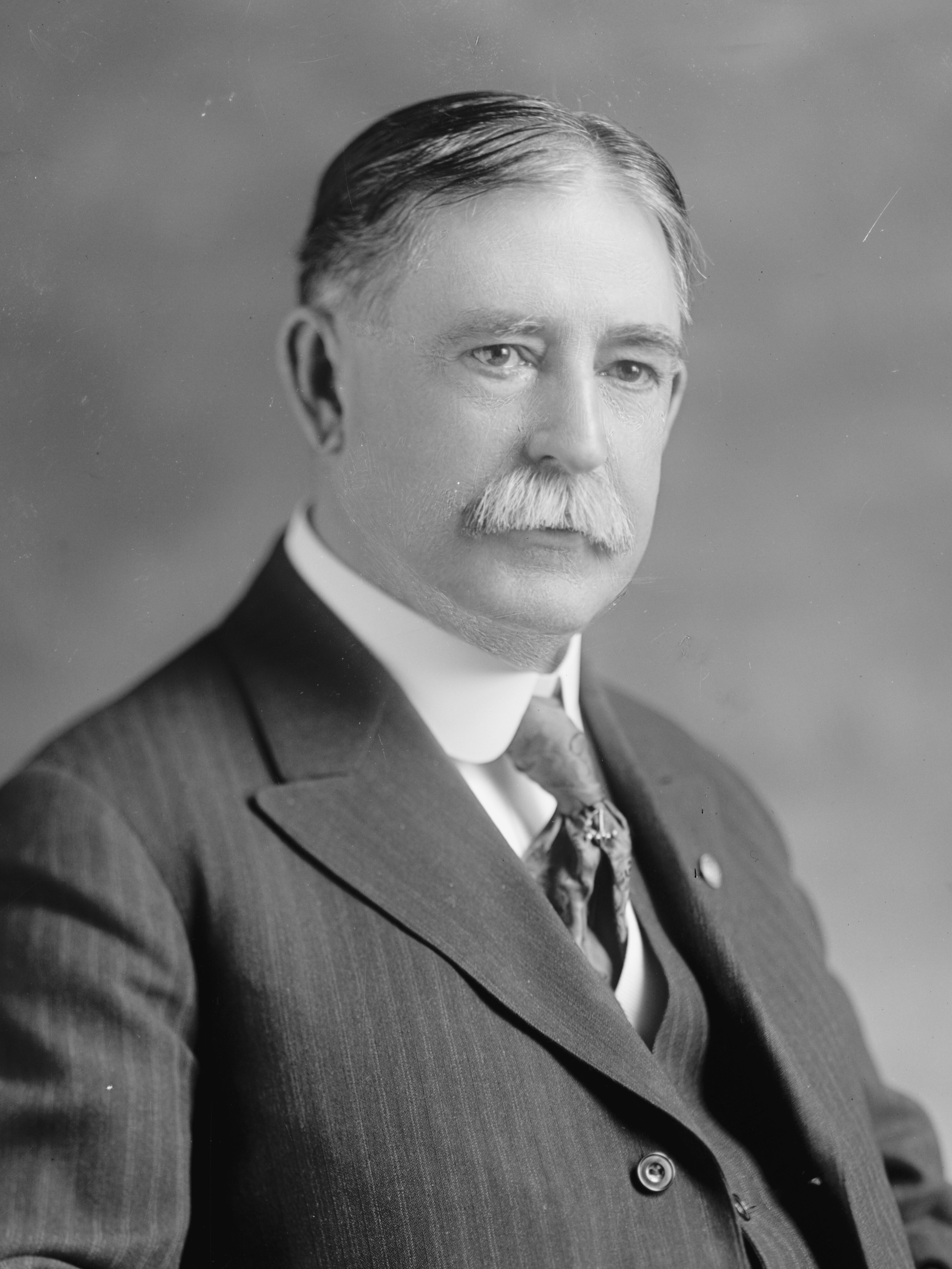
- Osborne c. 1917–1923

Member of the U.S. House of Representatives from California's 10th district
- In office March 4, 1917 – February 8, 1923
- Preceded by: Henry S. Benedict
- Succeeded by: John D. Fredericks

Personal details
- Born: Henry Zenas Osborne; October 4, 1848 New Lebanon, New York, U.S.
- Died: February 8, 1923 (aged 74) Los Angeles, California, U.S.
- Resting place: Angelus-Rosedale Cemetery
- Party: Republican

Henry Zenas Osborne (October 4, 1848 – February 8, 1923) was an American newspaperman and Republican politician who served in the United States House of Representatives from 1917 to 1923.

== Biography ==
He was born in New Lebanon, New York on October 4, 1848. In 1873 he worked for The New York Times.

== Congress ==
He was elected to the United States House of Representatives from California and served from March 4, 1917, until his death.

== Death and burial ==
Osborne died at age 74 in Los Angeles, California. He is interred in Angelus-Rosedale Cemetery.

== Electoral history ==
1914 United States House of Representatives elections
Party	Candidate	Votes	%
Progressive	William Stephens (Incumbent)	44,141	38.4
Republican	Henry Z. Osborne	33,172	28.9
Democratic	Nathan Newby	17,810	15.5
Socialist	Ralph L. Criswell	14,900	13.0
Prohibition	Henry Clay Needham	4,903	4.3
Total votes		70,926	100.0
Turnout			
Progressive hold			

1916 United States House of Representatives elections
Party	Candidate	Votes	%
Republican	Henry Z. Osborne	63,913	49.5
Democratic	Rufus W. Bowden	33,225	25.7
Progressive	Henry Stanley Benedict	14,305	11.1
Socialist	James H. Ryckman	9,000	7.0
Prohibition	Henry Clay Needham	8,781	6.8
Total votes		129,224	100.0
Turnout			
Republican hold			

1918 United States House of Representatives elections
Party	Candidate	Votes	%
Republican	Henry Z. Osborne (Incumbent)	72,773	88.2
Socialist	James H. Ryckman	9,725	11.8
Total votes		82,498	100.0
Turnout			
Republican hold			

1920 United States House of Representatives elections
Party	Candidate	Votes	%
Republican	Henry Z. Osborne (Incumbent)	97,469	82.7
Socialist	Upton Sinclair	20,439	17.3
Total votes		117,908	100.0
Turnout			
Republican hold			

1922 United States House of Representatives elections
Party	Candidate	Votes	%
Republican	Henry Z. Osborne (Incumbent)	98,739	100.0
Turnout		98,739	100
Republican hold			

== See also ==
- List of members of the United States Congress who died in office (1900–1949)

U.S. House of Representatives
Preceded by Henry S. Benedict	Member of the U.S. House of Representatives from California's 10th congressional district 1917–1923	Succeeded by John D. Fredericks
