= Lee C. Gates =

American politician (1856–1917)

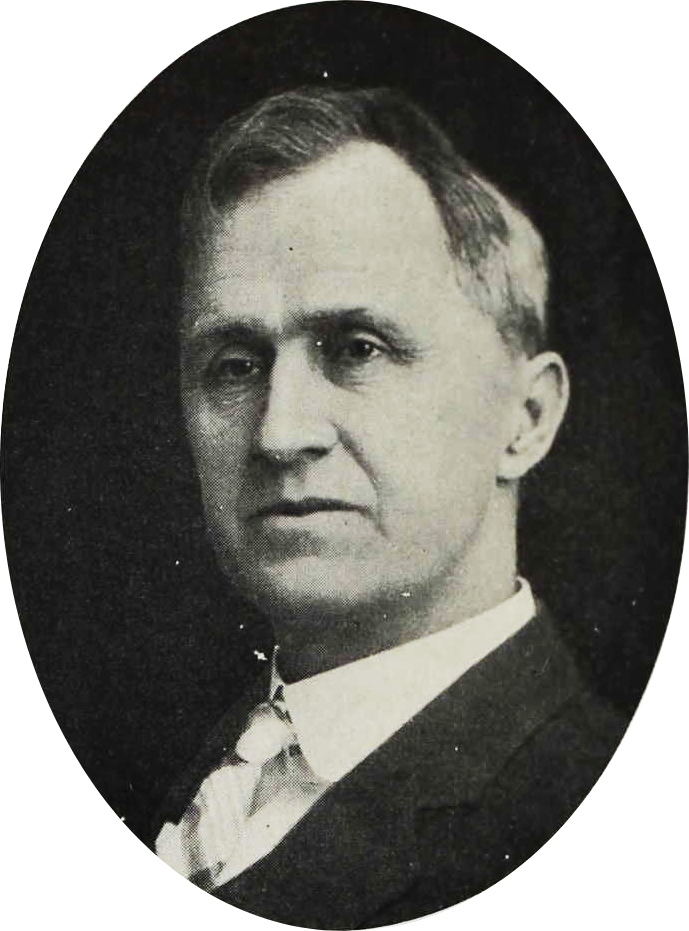
- Gates c. 1906

Member of the California Senate from the 34th district
- In office January 2, 1911 – January 4, 1915
- Preceded by: William H. Savage
- Succeeded by: Henry S. Benedict

Personal details
- Born: April 4, 1856 Preble County, Ohio, U.S.
- Died: June 14, 1917 (aged 61) Los Angeles, California, U.S.
- Resting place: Angelus-Rosedale Cemetery
- Party: Republican
- Other political affiliations: Independent (1906); Lincoln–Roosevelt League (1907–1910)
- Spouse: Bessie B. Caldwell (m. 1883)
- Children: Hazel; June
- Occupation: Attorney
- Known for: Progressive leader

Military service
- Allegiance: United States
- Branch/service: National Guard
- Years of service: 1883
- Rank: Lieutenant
- Unit: 4th Regiment, Ohio National Guard

Lee Channing Gates (April 4, 1856 – June 14, 1917) was an American attorney and politician who served one term in the California State Senate for the 34th district from 1911 to 1915. Gates and Assemblyman William C. Clark co-authored California's referendum and recall constitutional amendments.

In 1906, Gates was the non-partisan candidate for mayor of Los Angeles. He was a delegate to the 1912 Republican National Convention pledged to Theodore Roosevelt.
