= William Stephens (American politician) =

American politician (1859–1944)

William D. Stephens
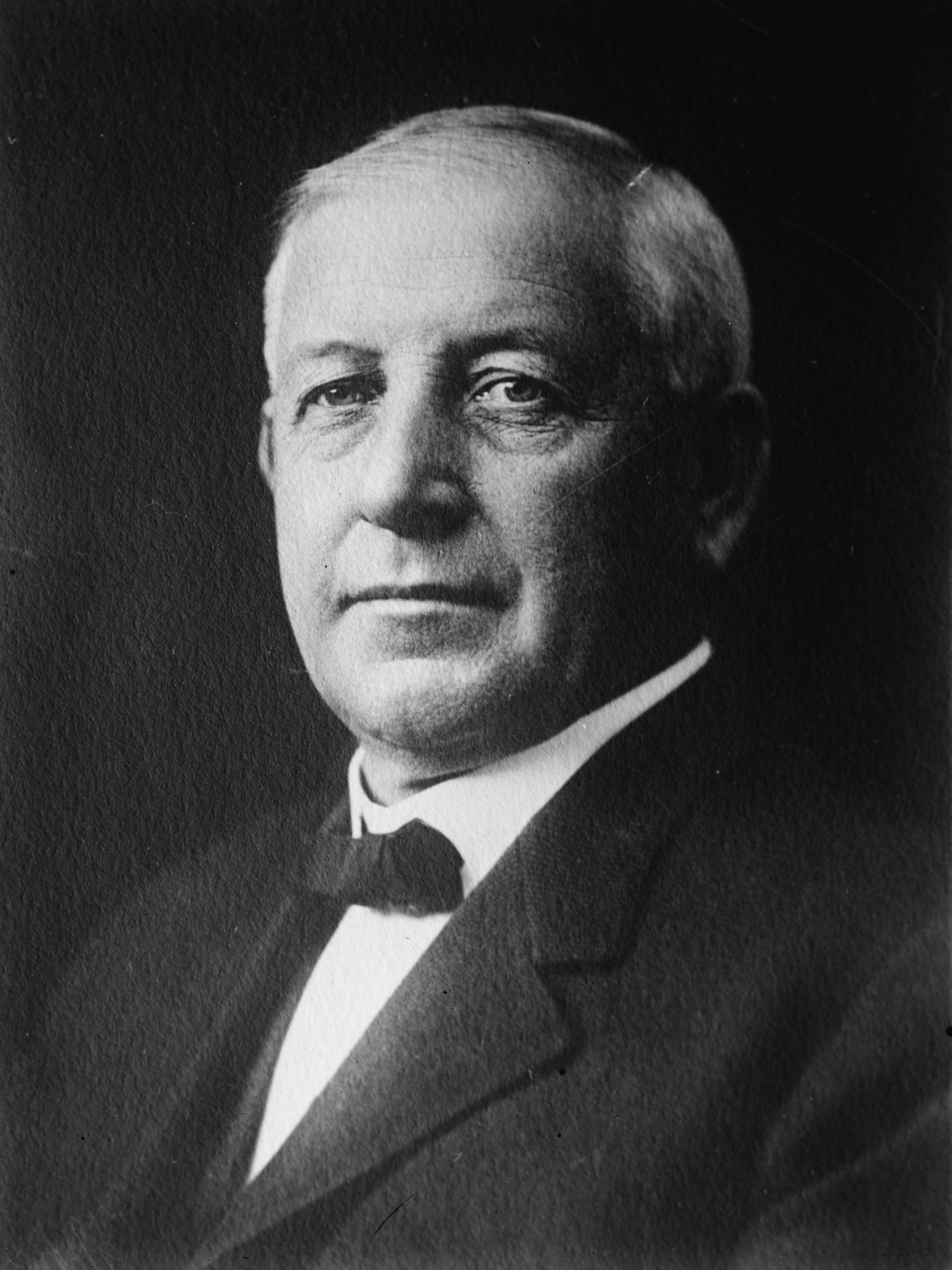
- Stephens, c. 1920–1925

24th Governor of California
- In office March 15, 1917 – January 8, 1923
- Lieutenant: Arthur H. Breed Sr. C. C. Young
- Preceded by: Hiram Johnson
- Succeeded by: Friend Richardson

27th Lieutenant Governor of California
- In office July 22, 1916 – March 15, 1917
- Governor: Hiram Johnson
- Preceded by: John Morton Eshleman
- Succeeded by: C. C. Young

Member of the U.S. House of Representatives from California
- In office March 4, 1911 – July 22, 1916
- Preceded by: James McLachlan
- Succeeded by: Henry S. Benedict
- Constituency: 7th district (1911–1913); 10th district (1913–1916)

27th Mayor of Los Angeles
- In office March 15, 1909 – March 26, 1909
- Preceded by: Arthur C. Harper
- Succeeded by: George Alexander

Personal details
- Born: William Dennison Stephens; December 26, 1859 Eaton, Ohio, US
- Died: April 25, 1944 (aged 84) Los Angeles, California, US
- Resting place: Angelus-Rosedale Cemetery, Los Angeles
- Party: Republican; Progressive
- Spouse: Flora E. Rawson
- Children: Barbara Zane
- Profession: Engineer, politician

Military service
- Allegiance: United States
- Branch/service: United States Army
- Years of service: 1904–1914
- Rank: Major
- Unit: California Army National Guard

William Dennison Stephens (December 26, 1859 – April 25, 1944) was an American federal and state politician. A three-term member of the U.S. House of Representatives from 1911 to 1916, Stephens was the 24th governor of California from 1917 to 1923. Prior to becoming Governor, Stephens served as the 27th lieutenant governor of California from 1916 to 1917, due to the death of John Morton Eshleman, and served a brief time as Mayor of Los Angeles in 1909 due to the resignation of Arthur C. Harper. He served as the 27th Mayor of Los Angeles in 1909.

As governor, he was a Progressive who kept the reforms of his predecessor, Hiram Johnson, and remained visible throughout his governorship. He lost a bid for re-nomination in 1922 to California State Treasurer Friend William Richardson, who campaigned as a conservative.

== Early life and career ==
Stephens was born in Eaton, Ohio, on December 26, 1859. He was the third child out of a total of nine children born to Martin and Alvira Stephens. With ambitions to become a lawyer, Stephens studied earnestly in law to become a lawyer, yet family fortunes required all of his earnings to go to his family instead.

Following his graduation from Eaton High School in 1876, Stephens had worked for three years as a school teacher before joining the railroad business to become an engineer. Between 1880 and 1887, Stephens helped survey the construction of railroads in Ohio, Indiana, Iowa and Louisiana. His days in the railroads came to an end in 1887 when his mother, Alvira, now falling ill, sought a hot and drier climate to improve her health. The Stephens family, including William, relocated to Los Angeles that year, though Alvira would be dead within a year.

After relocating to Los Angeles, Stephens began to work as a traveling salesman and later as a grocery manager. In 1891, Stephens married Flora E. Rawson (1869–1931). In 1902, he became a partner in Carr and Stephens Groceries, giving Stephens wide name recognition throughout Los Angeles. Increasingly, Stephens became involved in business and municipal politics, serving on the board of directors of the Los Angeles Chamber of Commerce from 1902 to 1911, as well as being elected to the Los Angeles Board of Education from 1906 to 1907. Stephens further served on the Los Angeles Board of Water Commissioners, working alongside William Mulholland in an advisory committee for the construction of the Los Angeles Aqueduct.

In 1906, Stephens served briefly as a major in the California Army National Guard during the San Francisco earthquake as part of the First Brigade. In 1909, he became vice president of the American National Bank.

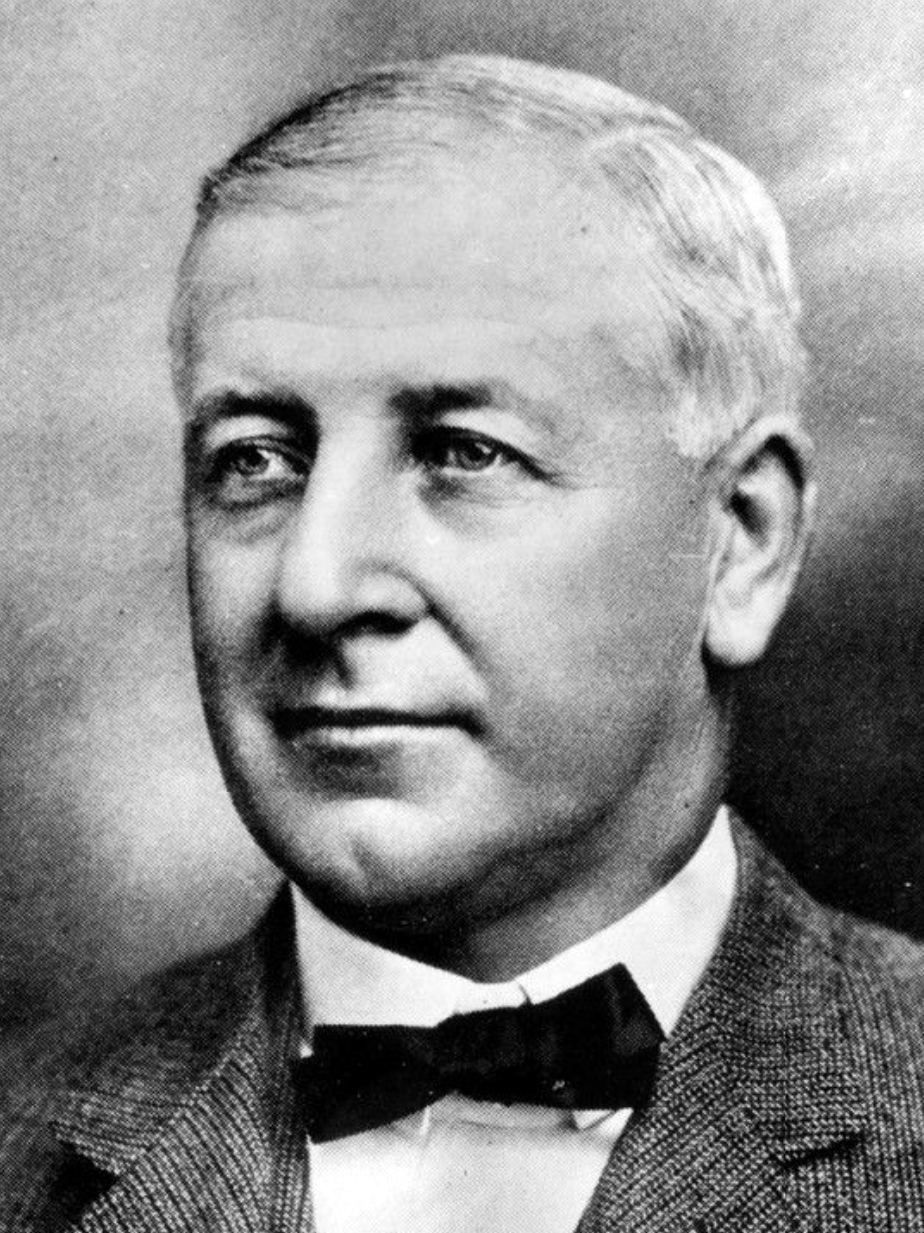
Stephens in 1909 after he was appointed Mayor

Following Los Angeles Mayor Arthur C. Harper's resignation from office shortly before a crucial recall election, Stephens was appointed to replace Harper on March 15, 1909, becoming the city's 27th mayor. Stephens' mayoralty lasted for less than two weeks before George Alexander, the winner of the election, assumed the office.

After his brief stint as mayor of Los Angeles, Stephens entered the realm of federal politics. In 1910, Stephens was elected as a Republican to the U.S. House of Representatives from the 7th district, after defeating his fellow Republican, incumbent James McLachlan, in the primary. Due to redistricting, Stephens changed constituencies to the newly created 10th district for the 1912 election, which he also won. During this period, Stephens increasingly identified himself as a member of the Progressive movement, becoming a member of the Progressive Party, led by former president Theodore Roosevelt and California Governor Hiram Johnson. Stephens was one of 13 Progressives to be elected to the U.S. House in the 1910s; four of them (including himself) came from California. He successfully defended his seat again in 1914, winning a third term in the House. Stephens would continue as a member of the Progressive Party until its dissolution in 1916, when he rejoined the Republican Party.

Following Lieutenant Governor John Morton Eshleman's death from tuberculosis on February 28, 1916, Governor Hiram Johnson sought a replacement for his subordinate. By mid-year, Johnson had selected Stephens as Eshleman's successor, forcing him to resign his U.S. House seat and assume the position of lieutenant governor on July 22.

Stephens' tenure as lieutenant governor was short-lived. Governor Johnson was elected to the U.S. Senate in November, 1916, leaving the governorship to his recently installed lieutenant governor. Johnson submitted his resignation to take his Senate seat on March 15, 1917, with Stephens succeeding him to become California's 24th governor.

== Governorship ==
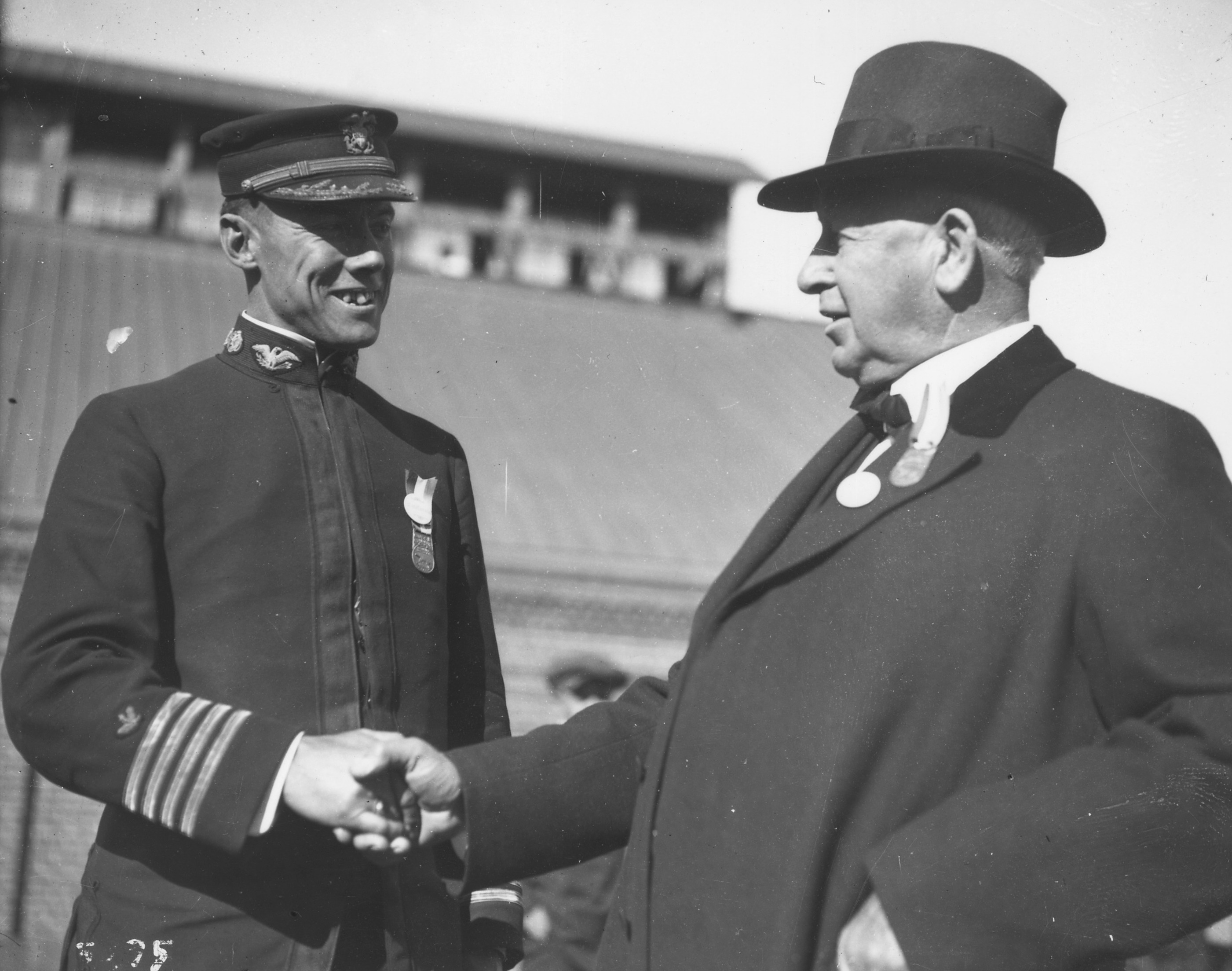
Stephens on the USS California in 1919.

Nearly immediately, Stephens faced controversy regarding the Preparedness Day Bombing, a terrorist attack on the San Francisco Preparedness Day parade on July 22, 1916 (the day Stephens had become lieutenant governor). The attack was blamed on left wing radicals, in particular former Industrial Workers of the World member Thomas Mooney, and his alleged accomplice, Warren Billings. Both Mooney and Billings were convicted, though critics said later that the trial was conducted in a lynch mob atmosphere. Governor Stephens supported both convictions. However, international sympathy for Mooney quickly spread, making him one of the United States's most famous political prisoners. There was national and international pressure on Stephens to intervene for Mooney. President Woodrow Wilson personally telegraphed Stephens to ask him to review the case against Mooney. Stephens yielded, but only slightly, commuting Mooney's death sentence to life imprisonment.

Despite this slight clemency, militant labor radicals continued to pressure Stephens, resulting in threats, and eventually, actions of violence. On the evening of December 17, 1917, a dynamite bomb exploded at the foot of the Governor's Mansion in Sacramento. Although Stephens was not injured, the explosion caused considerable damage to the kitchen. Radicals from the IWW were later blamed for the attack. In an unrelated threat, labor radicals also threatened to destroy both the California State Capitol and the Governor's Mansion if a $50,000 ransom was not met.

Stephens responded to threats from labor radicals, and to subversion worries during World War I, with the 1919 California Criminal Syndicalism Act, targeting radical labor unionists and their advocacy of violent confrontation with state authorities. Despite numerous threats on his life and state property, Stephens refused to pardon Thomas Mooney for the remainder of his administration. Mooney was eventually pardoned by Democratic governor Culbert Olson in 1939.

A Progressive like his predecessor Hiram Johnson, Stephens chose not to expand on the reforms made by Johnson. Instead, Stephens sought to keep the electoral and bureaucratic reforms already put in place.

In the 1918 state general election, Stephens won renomination for the Republican Party, campaigning on a platform to solidify Progressive reforms within the state government. He easily won the election, trouncing independent and former Democratic nominee Theodore A. Bell by a 20% margin. Other candidates included Republican Mayor of San Francisco James Rolph, who appeared as a write-in candidate at 3%, and Henry H. Roser of the Socialist Party of America with 4.2%.

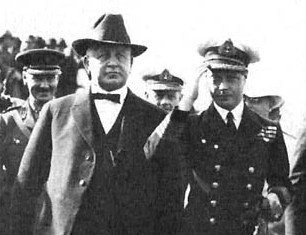
Governor Stephens walking with Edward, then Prince of Wales, in San Diego in 1920

After his successful election to a full four-year term as governor, Stephens grew increasingly concerned over the needs of returning World War I veterans. Stephens argued that the state government had a mandate to provide benefits for returning veterans, such as government-sponsored retraining and funds to help re-employment. Through his advocacy, a veteran assistance program was established. During the same time period, Stephens also supported state and federal prohibition of alcohol.

Like his predecessor Hiram Johnson, Stephens remained highly suspicious of Asian immigration to California, especially from Japan, which he viewed as an increasingly belligerent nation. In 1919, Stephens openly urged the California State Legislature to enact stricter exclusion laws to restrict Japanese immigrants. He declared that the influx of Japanese was a threat not only to California but to the United States. Through the remainder of his governorship, Stephens sought the aid of other governors and public officials to restrict Japanese immigration. In part, some of his goals were realized by the federal Immigration Act of 1924.

Despite threats on his life, Stephens remained publicly visible throughout his governorship. He was part of the general welcoming committee when Edward, Prince of Wales, arrived aboard HMS Renown in San Diego Bay in 1920, during the future British monarch's first visit to California. Stephens was also present when his daughter, Barbara (Mrs. Randolph T.) Zane, ceremonially launched the battleship USS California.

During his governorship, Stephens realized his lifelong dream by passing the California Bar to become a lawyer.

=== Reelection loss ===
In the final months of his governorship, Stephens vetoed bills that would deregulate state utilities, vowing to keep Johnson's Progressive reforms.

In 1922, Stephens sought another term as governor. However, Republican ranks had grown decidedly more conservative since 1918. He lost the Republican gubernatorial primary to California State Treasurer Friend William Richardson.

== Later life ==
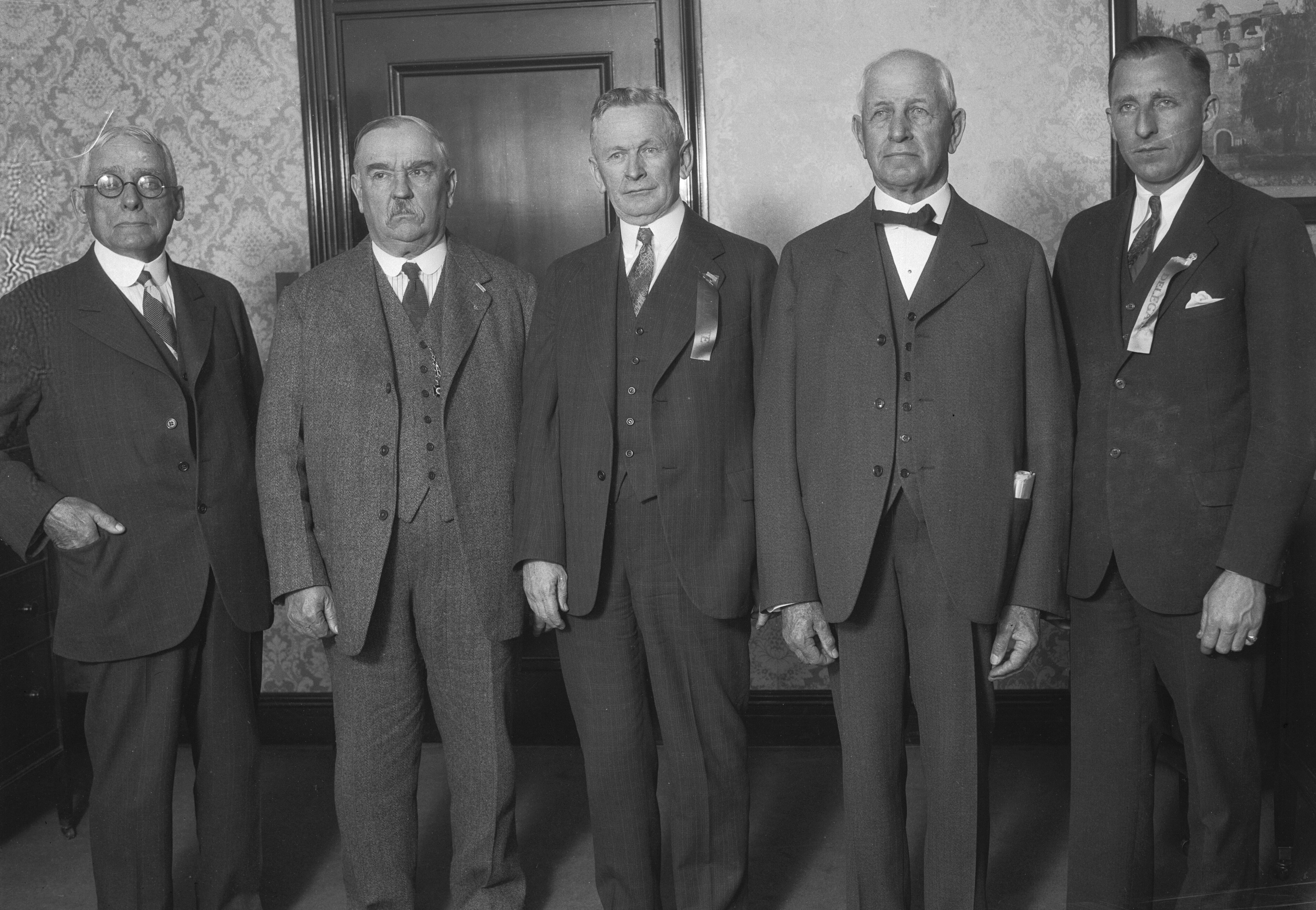
Current and former governors and lieutenant governors of California at a Herbert Hoover rally in Los Angeles, April 4, 1928. (L-R): Albert Joseph Wallace, Friend Richardson, C. C. Young, William Stephens, Buron Fitts

After failing in his bid for renomination, Stephens returned to Los Angeles to establish a law practice. He would never again hold public office, though he remained active in public affairs.

He died on April 25, 1944, at Santa Fe Hospital in Los Angeles of a heart ailment. He was 84 years old. He is interred in Angelus-Rosedale Cemetery, Los Angeles.

== Federal electoral results ==
United States House of Representatives elections, 1910
Party	Candidate	Votes	%
Republican	William Stephens (incumbent)	36,435	58.7
Democratic	Lorin A. Handley	13,340	21.5
Socialist	Thomas V. Williams	10,305	16.6
Prohibition	C. V. LeFontaine	1,990	3.2
Total votes		62,070	100.0
Turnout			
Republican hold			

1912 United States House of Representatives elections
Party	Candidate	Votes	%
Progressive	William Stephens (Incumbent)	43,637	53.4
Democratic	George Ringo	17,890	21.9
Socialist	Fred C. Wheeler	17,126	21.0
Prohibition	Emory D. Martindale	2,995	3.7
Total votes		81,648	100.0
Turnout			
Progressive hold			

1914 United States House of Representatives elections
Party	Candidate	Votes	%
Progressive	William Stephens (Incumbent)	44,141	38.4
Republican	Henry Z. Osborne	33,172	28.9
Democratic	Nathan Newby	17,810	15.5
Socialist	Ralph L. Criswell	14,900	13.0
Prohibition	Henry Clay Needham	4,903	4.3
Total votes		70,926	100.0
Turnout			
Progressive hold			

Political offices
Preceded by Arthur C. Harper	Mayor of Los Angeles; March 15, 1909–March 26, 1909	Succeeded by George Alexander
Preceded by John Morton Eshleman	Lieutenant Governor of California; 1916–1917	Succeeded by C. C. Young
Preceded by Hiram Johnson	Governor of California; 1917–1923	Succeeded by Friend Richardson
U.S. House of Representatives
Preceded by James McLachlan	Member of the U.S. House of Representatives from California's 7th congressional district 1911–1913	Succeeded by Denver S. Church
New district	Member of the U.S. House of Representatives from California's 10th congressional district 1913–1916	Succeeded by Henry S. Benedict
Party political offices
Preceded by John D. Fredericks	Republican nominee for Governor of California; 1918	Succeeded by Friend Richardson
