= Walter Lindley =

American physician

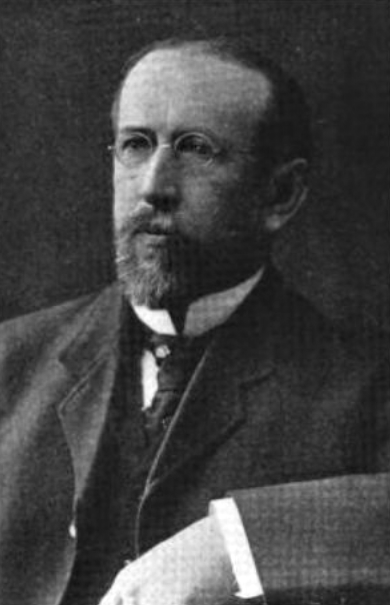
- Born: January 13, 1852; Monrovia, Indiana, U.S.
- Died: January 24, 1922 (aged 70); Los Angeles, California, U.S.
- Education: Keen School of Anatomy; Long Island College Hospital; Loyola Marymount University
- Occupation: Physician
- Spouse: Florence Haynes (m. 1894)
- Children: 4

Walter Lindley (January 13, 1852 – January 24, 1922) was an American medical doctor in Los Angeles, California, who was known for his charitable and civic works and for founding or overseeing the development of early medical and educational institutions in Southern California.

== Personal ==
Lindley was born January 13, 1852, in Monrovia, Indiana, the son of Milton Lindley of North Carolina and Mary Elizabeth Banta. He was married to Florence Haynes on July 18, 1894, in Los Angeles. They had four children, Francis Haynes, Dorothy (Mrs. Robert P. Fite), Myra (Mrs. Samuel F. Bothwell) and Flora (Mrs. Kitchen).

Lindley died of a cerebral hemorrhage on January 24, 1922, in the family home at 2207 South Figueroa Street, leaving his wife, children and four siblings. He was buried in Inglewood Park Cemetery.

== Education ==
Lindley went to high school in Minneapolis, Minnesota, and to Central Normal School in Kokomo, Indiana. He studied medicine at Keen School of Anatomy in Philadelphia, at Long Island College Hospital in Brooklyn, New York, (where he earned his degree) and Loyola Marymount University, Los Angeles.

== Vocation ==
He came to Los Angeles in 1875 after receiving his medical degree, and he established a free dispensary on Requena (Market) Street. Lindley became city health officer in 1879 and established the first system of births and deaths and set up a free vaccination program. He established the first training school in Southern California and founded the Whittier State School, a reform school for young people, of which he served as president. He also was a founder of the Los Angeles Orphans' Home, of the College of Medicine at the University of Southern California and of California Hospital.

He was superintendent of the Los Angeles County Hospital in 1885 and was president of the California State Medical Society.

=== Los Angeles Orphans' Home Society ===
Los Angeles Orphans' Home Society, Orphanage #2, Hollywood, Los Angeles, CA was home to Marilyn Monroe.

== Public service ==
Lindley was a member of the Los Angeles Board of Education in 1880 and 1881 and of the city's Board of Library Directors at the time of his death. He was also acting secretary of the California Board of Health when he died.

== Bibliography ==
He was the creator and editor of The Southern California Practitioner, a medical publication, and wrote or co-wrote the following:

- California of the South (1888)
- The Delinquent Child in Great Britain and France (1908)
- The Traducers of Shakespeare (1908)
- Irish Dramatists and Irish Drama (1914)
