= Arthur Cyprian Harper =

American politician (1866–1948)

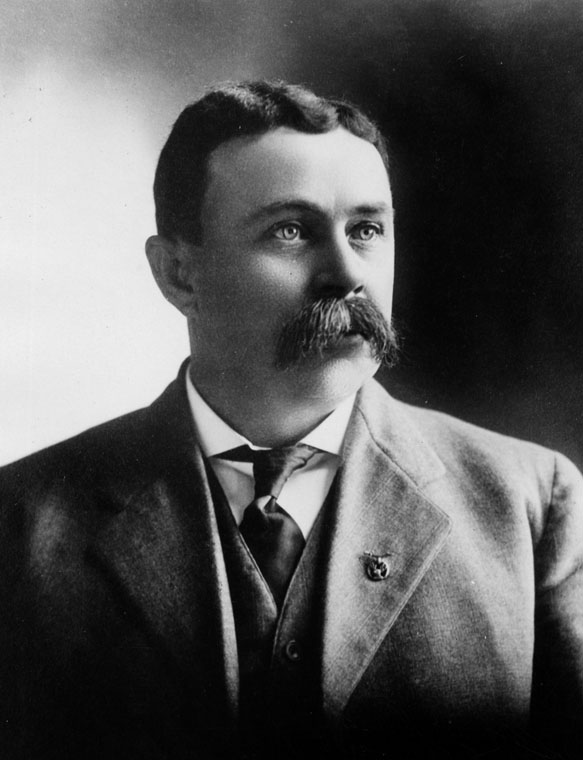
- Mayor Arthur C. Harper in office

26th Mayor of Los Angeles
- In office December 13, 1906 – March 11, 1909
- Preceded by: Owen McAleer
- Succeeded by: William Stephens

Personal details
- Born: 1866 Columbus, Mississippi, U.S.
- Died: December 25, 1948 (aged 81–82) Palmdale, California, U.S.
- Party: Democrat

Arthur Cyprian Harper (1866 – December 25, 1948) was an American banker who served as the 26th Mayor of Los Angeles, California, from December 13, 1906, to March 11, 1909. He was forced to resign in the wake of a recall drive due to dishonesty that marked his administration. While mayor, he began work on the Los Angeles Civic Center.

== Biography ==
A native of Columbus, Mississippi, Harper was the son of a wealthy businessman. He was bank teller that had a predilection for drinking, gambling, and frequenting brothels before becoming Mayor.

Harper was elected Mayor in 1906 and briefly had a honeymoon period with the Los Angeles Herald, saying his first year was the "most satisfactory twelve months in Los Angeles history." His administration was corrupt, with the Oil and Railroad industry controlling the city through bribes and payoffs. The city government also took protection money from brothels, casinos, and saloons. The Herald exposed the corruption after they uncovered a $25 million payout to Harper for the building of the Los Angeles Aqueduct. The Herald called his corruption "his dishonor" in a series of articles entitled "Is Vice Protected in Los Angeles?"

The public turned on Harper and started the first recall movement in American history, collecting 25,000 signatures in support. He decided to resign instead of facing a recall election.

Harper died in Palmdale, California, on December 25, 1948. He was buried at Angelus-Rosedale Cemetery in Central Los Angeles.
