= California's 2nd congressional district =

U.S. House district for California

Coordinates: 40.2°N 123.5°W

- Interactive map of district boundaries
- Representative: Jared Huffman; D–San Rafael
- Population (2025): 737,157
- Median household income: $99,529
- Ethnicity: 64.8% White; 20.6% Hispanic; 5.9% Two or more races; 4.3% Asian; 2.0% Native American; 1.6% Black; 0.9% other
- Cook PVI: D+24

California's 2nd congressional district is a U.S. congressional district in California. Jared Huffman, a Democrat, has represented the district since January 2013. It encompasses the North Coast region and adjacent areas of the state. It stretches from the Golden Gate Bridge to the Oregon border, and includes all of the portions of Highway 101 within California that are north of San Francisco, excepting a stretch in Sonoma County. The district consists of Marin, Mendocino, Humboldt, Del Norte, and Trinity counties, plus portions of Sonoma County. Cities in the district include San Rafael, Petaluma, Novato, Windsor, Healdsburg, Ukiah, Fort Bragg, Fortuna, Eureka, Arcata, McKinleyville, Crescent City, and northwestern Santa Rosa.

== History ==
From 2003 until the redistricting by the California Citizens Redistricting Commission that took effect in 2013, the 2nd district encompassed much of the far northern part of the state, from the Central Valley north of Sacramento to the Oregon border. It was the largest district by area in California. It consisted of Colusa, Glenn, Shasta, Siskiyou, Sutter, Tehama, Trinity, and Yuba counties, plus portions of Butte and Yolo counties.

The district had a dramatically different political history than its latest incarnation. While the 2nd is one of the most Democratic districts in California, the old 2nd had been a Republican stronghold for almost three decades. Much of this territory is now the 1st district, while most of the 2nd had been split between the 1st and 6th districts from 2003 to 2013.

== Recent election results from statewide races ==
=== 2023–2027 boundaries ===
Year	Office	Results
2008	President	Obama 73% - 26%
2010	Governor	Brown 65% - 31%
2010	Lt. Governor	Newsom 63% - 29%
2010	Secretary of State	Bowen 63% - 28%
2010	Attorney General	Harris 57% - 33%
2010	Treasurer	Lockyer 65% - 26%
2010	Controller	Chiang 64% - 26%
2012	President	Obama 72% - 28%
2014	Governor	Brown 73% - 27%
2016	President	Clinton 69% - 23%
2018	Governor	Newsom 72% - 28%
2018	Attorney General	Becerra 73% - 27%
2020	President	Biden 74% - 24%
2022	Senate (Reg.)	Padilla 73% - 27%
2022	Governor	Newsom 71% - 29%
2022	Lt. Governor	Kounalakis 72% - 28%
2022	Secretary of State	Weber 72% - 28%
2022	Attorney General	Bonta 71% - 29%
2022	Treasurer	Ma 71% - 29%
2022	Controller	Cohen 67% - 33%
2024	President	Harris 71% - 26%
2024	Senate (Reg.)	Schiff 71% - 29%

== Composition ==
FIPS County Code	County	Seat	Population
15	Del Norte	Crescent City	26,589
23	Humboldt	Eureka	133,985
41	Marin	San Rafael	254,407
45	Mendocino	Ukiah	89,108
97	Sonoma	Santa Rosa	481,812
105	Trinity	Weaverville	15,670

Under the 2020 redistricting, California's 2nd district is located on the North Coast, encompassing Del Norte, Humboldt, Marin, Mendocino, and Trinity counties, as well as most of Sonoma County. The area in Sonoma County includes the Monroe District of Santa Rosa; and the cities of Cloverdale, Healdsburg, Petaluma, and Windsor. Also included in the district is the eastern end of Angel Island in San Francisco Bay that is part of the City and County of San Francisco; more than 99% of the island is in Marin County.

Sonoma County is split between this district and the 4th district. They are partitioned by the Petaluma River, Highway 116, Redwood Highway, Robber Rd, Petersen Rd, Llano Rd, S Wright Rd, W College Ave, Jennings Ave, Administration Dr, Bicentennial Way, Cleveland Ave, Old Redwood Highway, Cross Creek Rd, Sonoma Highway, and Sonoma Creek.

=== Cities and CDPs with 10,000 or more people ===
- Santa Rosa – 175,845
- San Rafael – 61,271
- Petaluma – 59,776
- Novato – 53,225
- Eureka – 26,512
- Windsor – 26,344
- Arcata – 18,857
- Ukiah – 16,607
- McKinleyville – 16,262
- Mill Valley – 14,231
- Larkspur – 13,064
- San Anselmo – 12,830
- Fortuna – 12,516
- Tamalpais-Homestead Valley – 11,492
- Healdsburg – 11,137
- Corte Madera – 10,222

=== 2,500 – 10,000 people ===
- Tiburon – 9,146
- Cloverdale – 8,996
- Larkfield-Wikiup – 8,884
- Fairfax – 7,605
- Sebastopol – 7,448
- Sausalito – 7,269
- Fort Bragg – 6,983
- Kentfield – 6,808
- Crescent City – 6,673
- Lucas Valley-Marinwood – 6,259
- Strawberry – 5,447
- Willits – 4,988
- Myrtletown – 4,882
- Guerneville – 4,552
- Santa Venetia – 4,289
- Weaverville – 3,667
- Humboldt Hill – 3,498
- Rio Dell – 3,379
- Brooktrails – 3,632
- Forestville – 3,293
- Cutten – 3,223
- Pine Hills – 3,186
- Hoopa – 3,167
- Marin City – 2,993
- Bayview – 2,619
- Bertsch-Oceanview – 2,520

== Future composition ==
Beginning with the 2026 election, the 2nd district will consist of the following counties:

- Del Norte
- Humboldt
- Marin
- Mendocino (part)
- Modoc
- Shasta
- Siskiyou
- Sonoma (part)
- Trinity

== List of members representing the district ==
Member	Party	Dates	Cong ress(es)	Electoral history	Counties
District created March 4, 1865
William Higby (Calaveras)	Republican	March 4, 1865 – March 3, 1869	39th 40th	Redistricted from the at-large district and re-elected in 1864. Re-elected in 1867. Lost re-election.	1865–1873; Alameda, Alpine, Amador, Calaveras, Contra Costa, El Dorado, Mono, Nevada, Placer, Sacramento, San Joaquin, Tuolumne
Aaron A. Sargent (Nevada City)	Republican	March 4, 1869 – March 3, 1873	41st 42nd	Elected in 1868. Re-elected in 1871. Retired to run for U.S. Senator.	1865–1873; Alameda, Alpine, Amador, Calaveras, Contra Costa, El Dorado, Mono, Nevada, Placer, Sacramento, San Joaquin, Tuolumne
Horace F. Page (Placerville)	Republican	March 4, 1873 – March 3, 1883	43rd 44th 45th 46th 47th	Elected in 1872. Re-elected in 1875. Re-elected in 1876. Re-elected in 1879. Re-elected in 1880. Lost re-election.	1873–1885; Alameda, Alpine, Amador, Calaveras, Contra Costa, El Dorado, Nevada, Placer, Sacramento, San Joaquin, Tuolumne
James Budd (Stockton)	Democratic	March 4, 1883 – March 3, 1885	48th	Elected in 1882. Retired.	1873–1885; Alameda, Alpine, Amador, Calaveras, Contra Costa, El Dorado, Nevada, Placer, Sacramento, San Joaquin, Tuolumne
James A. Louttit (Stockton)	Republican	March 4, 1885 – March 3, 1887	49th	Elected in 1884. Retired.	1885–1893; Amador, Butte, Calaveras, El Dorado, Mariposa, Merced, Nevada, Placer, San Joaquin, Stanislaus, Sutter, Tuolumne, Yuba
Marion Biggs (Gridley)	Democratic	March 4, 1887 – March 3, 1891	50th 51st	Elected in 1886. Re-elected in 1888. Retired.	1885–1893; Amador, Butte, Calaveras, El Dorado, Mariposa, Merced, Nevada, Placer, San Joaquin, Stanislaus, Sutter, Tuolumne, Yuba
Anthony Caminetti (Jackson)	Democratic	March 4, 1891 – March 3, 1895	52nd 53rd	Elected in 1890. Re-elected in 1892. Lost re-election.	1885–1893; Amador, Butte, Calaveras, El Dorado, Mariposa, Merced, Nevada, Placer, San Joaquin, Stanislaus, Sutter, Tuolumne, Yuba
Anthony Caminetti (Jackson)	Democratic	March 4, 1891 – March 3, 1895	52nd 53rd	Elected in 1890. Re-elected in 1892. Lost re-election.	1893–1903; Alpine, Amador, Butte, Calaveras, El Dorado, Inyo, Mariposa, Mono, Nevada, Placer, Sacramento, San Joaquin, Sutter, Tuolumne, Yuba
Grove L. Johnson (Sacramento)	Republican	March 4, 1895 – March 3, 1897	54th	Elected in 1894. Lost re-election.	1893–1903; Alpine, Amador, Butte, Calaveras, El Dorado, Inyo, Mariposa, Mono, Nevada, Placer, Sacramento, San Joaquin, Sutter, Tuolumne, Yuba
Marion De Vries (Stockton)	Democratic	March 4, 1897 – August 20, 1900	55th 56th	Elected in 1896. Re-elected in 1898. Resigned when appointed as a member of the Board of General Appraisers	1893–1903; Alpine, Amador, Butte, Calaveras, El Dorado, Inyo, Mariposa, Mono, Nevada, Placer, Sacramento, San Joaquin, Sutter, Tuolumne, Yuba
Vacant		August 20, 1900 – December 3, 1900	56th		1893–1903; Alpine, Amador, Butte, Calaveras, El Dorado, Inyo, Mariposa, Mono, Nevada, Placer, Sacramento, San Joaquin, Sutter, Tuolumne, Yuba
Samuel D. Woods (Stockton)	Republican	December 3, 1900 – March 3, 1903	56th 57th	Elected to finish De Vries's term. Retired.	1893–1903; Alpine, Amador, Butte, Calaveras, El Dorado, Inyo, Mariposa, Mono, Nevada, Placer, Sacramento, San Joaquin, Sutter, Tuolumne, Yuba
Theodore Arlington Bell (Napa)	Democratic	March 4, 1903 – March 3, 1905	58th	Elected in 1902. Lost re-election.	1903–1913; Butte, Colusa, Glenn, Lake, Marin, Mendocino, Napa, Sacramento, Sonoma, Sutter, Yolo, Yuba
Duncan E. McKinlay (Santa Rosa)	Republican	March 4, 1905 – March 3, 1911	59th 60th 61st	Elected in 1904. Re-elected in 1906. Re-elected in 1908. Lost renomination.	1903–1913; Butte, Colusa, Glenn, Lake, Marin, Mendocino, Napa, Sacramento, Sonoma, Sutter, Yolo, Yuba
William Kent (Kentfield)	Progressive Republican	March 4, 1911 – March 3, 1913	62nd	Elected in 1910. Redistricted to the 1st district.	1903–1913; Butte, Colusa, Glenn, Lake, Marin, Mendocino, Napa, Sacramento, Sonoma, Sutter, Yolo, Yuba
John E. Raker (Alturas)	Democratic	March 4, 1913 – January 22, 1926	63rd 64th 65th 66th 67th 68th 69th	Redistricted from the 1st district and re-elected in 1912. Re-elected in 1914. Re-elected in 1916. Re-elected in 1918. Re-elected in 1920. Re-elected in 1922. Re-elected in 1924. Died.	1913–1933; Alpine, Amador, Calaveras, El Dorado, Lassen, Mariposa, Modoc, Nevada, Placer, Plumas, Shasta, Sierra, Siskiyou, Tehama, Trinity, Tuolumne
Vacant		January 22, 1926 – August 31, 1926	69th		1913–1933; Alpine, Amador, Calaveras, El Dorado, Lassen, Mariposa, Modoc, Nevada, Placer, Plumas, Shasta, Sierra, Siskiyou, Tehama, Trinity, Tuolumne
Harry Lane Englebright (Nevada City)	Republican	August 31, 1926 – May 13, 1943	69th 70th 71st 72nd 73rd 74th 75th 76th 77th 78th	Elected to finish Raker's term. Re-elected in 1926. Re-elected in 1928. Re-elected in 1930. Re-elected in 1932. Re-elected in 1934. Re-elected in 1936. Re-elected in 1938. Re-elected in 1940. Re-elected in 1942. Died.	1913–1933; Alpine, Amador, Calaveras, El Dorado, Lassen, Mariposa, Modoc, Nevada, Placer, Plumas, Shasta, Sierra, Siskiyou, Tehama, Trinity, Tuolumne
Harry Lane Englebright (Nevada City)	Republican	August 31, 1926 – May 13, 1943	69th 70th 71st 72nd 73rd 74th 75th 76th 77th 78th	Elected to finish Raker's term. Re-elected in 1926. Re-elected in 1928. Re-elected in 1930. Re-elected in 1932. Re-elected in 1934. Re-elected in 1936. Re-elected in 1938. Re-elected in 1940. Re-elected in 1942. Died.	1933–1953; Alpine, Amador, Calaveras, El Dorado, Inyo, Lassen, Mariposa, Modoc, Mono, Nevada, Placer, Plumas, Shasta, Sierra, Siskiyou, Tehama, Trinity, Tuolumne
Vacant		May 13, 1943 – August 31, 1943	78th		1933–1953; Alpine, Amador, Calaveras, El Dorado, Inyo, Lassen, Mariposa, Modoc, Mono, Nevada, Placer, Plumas, Shasta, Sierra, Siskiyou, Tehama, Trinity, Tuolumne
Clair Engle (Red Bluff)	Democratic	August 31, 1943 – January 3, 1959	78th 79th 80th 81st 82nd 83rd 84th 85th	Elected to finish Englebright's term. Re-elected in 1944. Re-elected in 1946. Re-elected in 1948. Re-elected in 1950. Re-elected in 1952. Re-elected in 1954. Re-elected in 1956. Retired to run for U.S. Senator.	1933–1953; Alpine, Amador, Calaveras, El Dorado, Inyo, Lassen, Mariposa, Modoc, Mono, Nevada, Placer, Plumas, Shasta, Sierra, Siskiyou, Tehama, Trinity, Tuolumne
Clair Engle (Red Bluff)	Democratic	August 31, 1943 – January 3, 1959	78th 79th 80th 81st 82nd 83rd 84th 85th	Elected to finish Englebright's term. Re-elected in 1944. Re-elected in 1946. Re-elected in 1948. Re-elected in 1950. Re-elected in 1952. Re-elected in 1954. Re-elected in 1956. Retired to run for U.S. Senator.	1953–1963; Alpine, Amador, Butte, Calaveras, El Dorado, Inyo, Lassen, Mariposa, Modoc, Mono, Nevada, Placer, Plumas, Shasta, Sierra, Siskiyou, Tehama, Trinity, Tuolumne
Harold T. Johnson (Roseville)	Democratic	January 3, 1959 – January 3, 1975	86th 87th 88th 89th 90th 91st 92nd 93rd	Elected in 1958. Re-elected in 1960. Re-elected in 1962. Re-elected in 1964. Re-elected in 1966. Re-elected in 1968. Re-elected in 1970. Re-elected in 1972. Redistricted to the 1st district.	1953–1963; Alpine, Amador, Butte, Calaveras, El Dorado, Inyo, Lassen, Mariposa, Modoc, Mono, Nevada, Placer, Plumas, Shasta, Sierra, Siskiyou, Tehama, Trinity, Tuolumne
Harold T. Johnson (Roseville)	Democratic	January 3, 1959 – January 3, 1975	86th 87th 88th 89th 90th 91st 92nd 93rd	Elected in 1958. Re-elected in 1960. Re-elected in 1962. Re-elected in 1964. Re-elected in 1966. Re-elected in 1968. Re-elected in 1970. Re-elected in 1972. Redistricted to the 1st district.	1963–1973; Alpine, Amador, Butte, Calaveras, El Dorado, Inyo, Lassen, Madera, Mariposa, Modoc, Mono, Nevada, Placer, Plumas, Shasta, Sierra, Siskiyou, Tehama, Trinity, Tuolumne
Harold T. Johnson (Roseville)	Democratic	January 3, 1959 – January 3, 1975	86th 87th 88th 89th 90th 91st 92nd 93rd	Elected in 1958. Re-elected in 1960. Re-elected in 1962. Re-elected in 1964. Re-elected in 1966. Re-elected in 1968. Re-elected in 1970. Re-elected in 1972. Redistricted to the 1st district.	1973–1975; Alpine, Butte, Lassen, Modoc, Nevada County, Placer, Plumas, Shasta, Sierra, Siskiyou, Tehama, Trinity
Donald H. Clausen (Crescent City)	Republican	January 3, 1975 – January 3, 1983	94th 95th 96th 97th	Redistricted from the 1st district and re-elected in 1974. Re-elected in 1976. Re-elected in 1978. Re-elected in 1980. Redistricted to the 1st district and lost re-election there.	1975–1983; Del Norte, Humboldt, Mendocino, Napa, Sonoma
Eugene A. Chappie (Chico)	Republican	January 3, 1983 – January 3, 1987	98th 99th	Redistricted from the 1st district and re-elected in 1982. Re-elected in 1984. Retired.	1983–1993; Butte, Colusa, Glenn, most of Lake, northern Napa, a tiny portion of Nevada, Shasta, Siskiyou, Sutter, Tehama, Trinity, Yuba
Wally Herger (Chico)	Republican	January 3, 1987 – January 3, 2013	100th 101st 102nd 103rd 104th 105th 106th 107th 108th 109th 110th 111th 112th	Elected in 1986. Re-elected in 1988. Re-elected in 1990. Re-elected in 1992. Re-elected in 1994. Re-elected in 1996. Re-elected in 1998. Re-elected in 2000. Re-elected in 2002. Re-elected in 2004. Re-elected in 2006. Re-elected in 2008. Re-elected in 2010. Redistricted to the 1st district and retired.	1983–1993; Butte, Colusa, Glenn, most of Lake, northern Napa, a tiny portion of Nevada, Shasta, Siskiyou, Sutter, Tehama, Trinity, Yuba
Wally Herger (Chico)	Republican	January 3, 1987 – January 3, 2013	100th 101st 102nd 103rd 104th 105th 106th 107th 108th 109th 110th 111th 112th	Elected in 1986. Re-elected in 1988. Re-elected in 1990. Re-elected in 1992. Re-elected in 1994. Re-elected in 1996. Re-elected in 1998. Re-elected in 2000. Re-elected in 2002. Re-elected in 2004. Re-elected in 2006. Re-elected in 2008. Re-elected in 2010. Redistricted to the 1st district and retired.	1993–2003; Butte (except Gridley), Lassen, Modoc, Nevada, Plumas, Shasta, Sierra, Siskiyou, Trinity, Yuba
Wally Herger (Chico)	Republican	January 3, 1987 – January 3, 2013	100th 101st 102nd 103rd 104th 105th 106th 107th 108th 109th 110th 111th 112th	Elected in 1986. Re-elected in 1988. Re-elected in 1990. Re-elected in 1992. Re-elected in 1994. Re-elected in 1996. Re-elected in 1998. Re-elected in 2000. Re-elected in 2002. Re-elected in 2004. Re-elected in 2006. Re-elected in 2008. Re-elected in 2010. Redistricted to the 1st district and retired.	2003–2013 Most of Butte, Colusa, Glenn, Shasta, Siskiyou, Sutter, Tehama, Trinity, northern Yolo, Yuba
Jared Huffman (San Rafael)	Democratic	January 3, 2013 – present	113th 114th 115th 116th 117th 118th 119th	Elected in 2012. Re-elected in 2014. Re-elected in 2016. Re-elected in 2018. Re-elected in 2020. Re-elected in 2022. Re-elected in 2024. Re-elected in 2026.	2013–2023 California's North Coast including Del Norte, Humboldt, Marin, Mendocino, and Trinity counties. Also coastal Sonoma County.
Jared Huffman (San Rafael)	Democratic	January 3, 2013 – present	113th 114th 115th 116th 117th 118th 119th	Elected in 2012. Re-elected in 2014. Re-elected in 2016. Re-elected in 2018. Re-elected in 2020. Re-elected in 2022. Re-elected in 2024. Re-elected in 2026.	2023–present

== Election results ==
=== 1864 ===
1864 United States House of Representatives elections in California, 2nd district
Party	Candidate	Votes	%
Republican	William Higby	23,414	61.6
Democratic	James W. Coffroth	14,581	38.4
Total votes		37,995	100.0
Turnout			
Republican hold			

=== 1867 ===
1867 United States House of Representatives elections in California, 2nd district
Party	Candidate	Votes	%
Republican	William Higby (incumbent)	16,053	52.0
Democratic	James W. Coffroth	14,786	48.0
Total votes		30,839	100.0
Turnout			
Republican hold			

=== 1868 ===
1868 United States House of Representatives elections in California, 2nd district
Party	Candidate	Votes	%
Republican	Aaron Augustus Sargent	18,264	54.7
Democratic	James W. Coffroth	15,124	45.3
Total votes		33,388	100.0
Turnout			
Republican hold			

=== 1871 ===
1871 United States House of Representatives elections in California, 2nd district
Party	Candidate	Votes	%
Republican	Aaron Augustus Sargent (incumbent)	18,065	54.0
Democratic	James W. Coffroth	15,382	46.0
Total votes		33,447	100.0
Turnout			
Republican hold			

=== 1872 ===
1872 United States House of Representatives elections in California, 2nd district
Party	Candidate	Votes	%
Republican	Horace F. Page	13,803	51.9
Democratic	Pasz Coggins	12,816	48.1
Total votes		26,619	100.0
Turnout			
Republican hold			

=== 1875 ===
1875 United States House of Representatives elections in California, 2nd district
Party	Candidate	Votes	%
Republican	Horace F. Page (incumbent)	13,624	43.4
Democratic	Hy Larkin	12,154	38.8
Independent	Charles R. Tuttle	5,589	17.8
Total votes		31,367	100.0
Turnout			
Republican hold			

=== 1876 ===
1876 United States House of Representatives elections in California, 2nd district
Party	Candidate	Votes	%
Republican	Horace F. Page (incumbent)	20,815	56.7
Democratic	G. J. Carpenter	15,916	43.3
Total votes		36,731	100.0
Turnout			
Republican hold			

=== 1879 ===
1879 United States House of Representatives elections in California, 2nd district
Party	Candidate	Votes	%
Republican	Horace F. Page (incumbent)	19,386	51.9
Democratic	Thomas J. Clunie	12,847	34.4
Workingman's	H. B. Williams	5,139	13.8
Total votes		37,372	100.0
Turnout			
Republican hold			

=== 1880 ===
1880 United States House of Representatives elections in California, 2nd district
Party	Candidate	Votes	%
Republican	Horace F. Page (incumbent)	22,038	53.6
Democratic	John R. Glasscock	18,859	45.9
Greenback	Benjamin Todd	296	0.4
Prohibition	B. K. Lowe	41	0.1
Total votes		41,118	100.0
Turnout			
Republican hold			

=== 1882 ===
1882 United States House of Representatives elections in California, 2nd district
Party	Candidate	Votes	%
Democratic	James Budd	20,229	50.5
Republican	Horace F. Page (incumbent)	19,246	48.1
Prohibition	J. L. Coles	478	1.2
Greenback	F. J. Woodward	78	0.2
Total votes		40,031	100.0
Turnout			
Democratic gain from Republican			

=== 1884 ===
1884 United States House of Representatives elections in California, 2nd district
Party	Candidate	Votes	%
Republican	James A. Louttit	18,327	49.4
Democratic	Charles Allen Sumner	18,208	49.1
Prohibition	Joshua B. Webster	558	1.5
Total votes		37,093	100.0
Turnout			
Republican gain from Democratic			

=== 1886 ===
1886 United States House of Representatives elections in California, 2nd district
Party	Candidate	Votes	%
Democratic	Marion Biggs	17,667	50.0
Republican	J. C. Campbell	16,594	47.0
Prohibition	W. O. Clark	1,076	3.0
Total votes		35,337	100.0
Turnout			
Democratic gain from Republican			

=== 1888 ===
1888 United States House of Representatives elections in California, 2nd district
Party	Candidate	Votes	%
Democratic	Marion Biggs (incumbent)	19,064	50.6
Republican	John A. Eagon	17,541	46.6
Independent	S. M. McLean	913	2.4
Know Nothing	J. F. McSwain	138	0.4
Total votes		37,656	100.0
Turnout			
Democratic hold			

=== 1890 ===
1890 United States House of Representatives elections in California, 2nd district
Party	Candidate	Votes	%
Democratic	Anthony Caminetti	18,644	49.0
Republican	George G. Blanchard	18,485	48.6
Prohibition	J. S. Witherell	912	2.4
Total votes		38,041	100.0
Turnout			
Democratic hold			

=== 1892 ===
1892 United States House of Representatives elections in California, 2nd district
Party	Candidate	Votes	%
Democratic	Anthony Caminetti (incumbent)	20,741	53.3
Republican	John F. Davis	16,781	43.1
Prohibition	Chauncey H. Dunn	1,307	3.4
Independent	J. H. White	122	0.3
Total votes		38,951	100.0
Turnout			
Democratic hold			

=== 1894 ===
1894 United States House of Representatives elections in California, 2nd district
Party	Candidate	Votes	%
Republican	Grove L. Johnson	19,302	43.0
Democratic	Anthony Caminetti (incumbent)	15,732	35.1
Populist	Burdell Cornell	8,946	20.0
Prohibition	Elam Briggs	866	1.9
Total votes		44,846	100.0
Turnout			
Republican gain from Democratic			

=== 1896 ===
1896 United States House of Representatives elections in California, 2nd district
Party	Candidate	Votes	%
Democratic	Marion De Vries	24,434	55.5
Republican	Grove L. Johnson (incumbent)	18,613	42.3
Prohibition	F. E. Coulter	974	2.2
Total votes		44,021	100.0
Turnout			
Democratic gain from Republican			

=== 1898 ===
1898 United States House of Representatives elections in California, 2nd district
Party	Candidate	Votes	%
Democratic	Marion De Vries (incumbent)	25,196	55.3
Republican	Frank D. Ryan	20,400	44.7
Total votes		45,596	100.0
Turnout			
Democratic hold			

=== 1900 (Special) ===
United States House of Representatives special election, November 6, 1900
Party	Candidate	Votes	%
Republican	Samuel D. Woods	N/A	51.0
Democratic	J. D. Sproul	N/A	49.0
Total votes		N/A	100.0
Turnout			
Republican gain from Democratic			

=== 1900 (General) ===
1900 United States House of Representatives elections in California, 2nd district
Party	Candidate	Votes	%
Republican	Samuel D. Woods	23,019	50.4
Democratic	J. D. Sproul	21,851	47.9
Social Democratic	W. F. Lockwood	402	0.9
Prohibition	W. H. Barron	371	0.8
Total votes		45,643	100.0
Turnout			
Republican gain from Democratic			

=== 1902 ===
1902 United States House of Representatives elections in California, 2nd district
Party	Candidate	Votes	%
Democratic	Theodore A. Bell	21,536	49.2
Republican	Frank Coombs (incumbent)	21,181	48.3
Socialist	G. H. Rogers	731	1.7
Prohibition	W. P. Fassett	367	0.8
Total votes		43,815	100.0
Turnout			
Democratic gain from Republican			

=== 1904 ===
1904 United States House of Representatives elections in California, 2nd district
Party	Candidate	Votes	%
Republican	Duncan E. McKinlay (incumbent)	22,873	49.2
Democratic	Theodore A. Bell	21,640	46.6
Socialist	J. H. White	1,524	3.3
Prohibition	Eli P. LaCell	431	0.9
Total votes		46,468	100.0
Turnout			
Republican gain from Democratic			

=== 1906 ===
1906 United States House of Representatives elections in California, 2nd district
Party	Candidate	Votes	%
Republican	Duncan E. McKinlay (incumbent)	23,411	51.8
Democratic	W. A. Beard	20,262	44.8
Socialist	A. J. Gaylord	1,524	3.4
Total votes		45,197	100.0
Turnout			
Republican hold			

=== 1908 ===
1908 United States House of Representatives elections in California, 2nd district
Party	Candidate	Votes	%
Republican	Duncan E. McKinlay (incumbent)	28,627	57.5
Democratic	W. K. Hays	19,193	38.5
Socialist	A. J. Gaylord	2,003	4.0
Total votes		49,823	100.0
Turnout			
Republican hold			

=== 1910 ===
1910 United States House of Representatives elections in California, 2nd district
Party	Candidate	Votes	%
Republican	William Kent	25,346	50.1
Democratic	I. G. Zumwalt	22,229	44.0
Socialist	W. H. Ferber	2,647	5.2
Prohibition	Henry P. Stipp	329	0.7
Total votes		50,451	100.0
Turnout			
Republican hold			

=== 1912 ===
1912 United States House of Representatives elections in California, 2nd district
Party	Candidate	Votes	%
Democratic	John E. Raker (incumbent)	23,467	62.6
Republican	Frank M. Rutherford	10,178	27.2
Socialist	J. C. Williams	3,818	10.2
Total votes		37,463	100.0
Turnout			
Democratic hold			

=== 1914 ===
1914 United States House of Representatives elections in California, 2nd district
Party	Candidate	Votes	%
Democratic	John E. Raker (incumbent)	32,575	64.7
Republican	James T. Matlock	15,716	31.2
Prohibition	W. P. Fassett	2,086	4.1
Total votes		50,377	100.0
Turnout			
Democratic hold			

=== 1916 ===
1916 United States House of Representatives elections in California, 2nd district
Party	Candidate	Votes	%
Democratic	John E. Raker (incumbent)	30,042	71.0
Republican	Edward H. Hart	12,282	29.0
Total votes		42,324	100
Turnout			
Democratic hold			

=== 1918 ===
1918 United States House of Representatives elections in California, 2nd district
Party	Candidate	Votes	%
Democratic	John E. Raker (incumbent)	28,249	100.0
Turnout			
Democratic hold			

=== 1920 ===
1920 United States House of Representatives elections in California, 2nd district
Party	Candidate	Votes	%
Democratic	John E. Raker (incumbent)	26,172	100.0
Turnout			
Democratic hold			

=== 1922 ===
1922 United States House of Representatives elections in California, 2nd district
Party	Candidate	Votes	%
Democratic	John E. Raker (incumbent)	32,981	100.0
Turnout			
Democratic hold			

=== 1924 ===
1924 United States House of Representatives elections in California, 2nd district
Party	Candidate	Votes	%
Democratic	John E. Raker (incumbent)	30,590	100.0
Turnout			
Democratic hold			

=== 1926 (Special) ===
August 31, 1926 special election
Party	Candidate	Votes	%
Republican	Harry Lane Englebright	11,462	26.0
Republican	Frank J Powers	10,237	23.2
Republican	Ferdinand G. Stevenot	8,763	19.9
Republican	Marshall De Motte	8,001	18.2
Democratic	Robert H De Witt	5,572	12.7
Total votes		44,035	100.0
Turnout			
Republican gain from Democratic			

=== 1926 ===
1926 United States House of Representatives elections in California, 2nd district
Party	Candidate	Votes	%
Republican	Harry Lane Englebright (incumbent)	32,264	100.0
Turnout			
Republican gain from Democratic			

=== 1928 ===
1928 United States House of Representatives elections in California, 2nd district
Party	Candidate	Votes	%
Republican	Harry Lane Englebright (incumbent)	32,455	100.0
Turnout			
Republican hold			

=== 1930 ===
1930 United States House of Representatives elections in California, 2nd district
Party	Candidate	Votes	%
Republican	Harry Lane Englebright (incumbent)	35,941	100.0
Turnout			
Republican hold			

=== 1932 ===
1932 United States House of Representatives elections in California, 2nd district
Party	Candidate	Votes	%
Republican	Harry Lane Englebright (incumbent)	43,146	100.0
Turnout			
Republican hold			

=== 1934 ===
1934 United States House of Representatives elections in California, 2nd district
Party	Candidate	Votes	%
Republican	Harry Lane Englebright (incumbent)	66,370	100.0
Turnout			
Republican hold			

=== 1936 ===
1936 United States House of Representatives elections in California, 2nd district
Party	Candidate	Votes	%
Republican	Harry Lane Englebright (incumbent)	51,416	100.0
Turnout			
Republican hold			

=== 1938 ===
1938 United States House of Representatives elections in California, 2nd district
Party	Candidate	Votes	%
Republican	Harry Lane Englebright (incumbent)	71,496	100.0
Turnout			
Republican hold			

=== 1940 ===
1940 United States House of Representatives elections in California, 2nd district
Party	Candidate	Votes	%
Republican	Harry Lane Englebright (incumbent)	71,033	100.0
Turnout			
Republican hold			

=== 1942 ===
1942 United States House of Representatives elections in California, 2nd district
Party	Candidate	Votes	%
Republican	Harry Lane Englebright (incumbent)	50,094	100.0
Turnout			
Republican hold			

=== 1943 (Special) ===
August 31, 1943 special election
Party	Candidate	Votes	%
Democratic	Clair Engle	1,721	53.3
Republican	Grace Engelbright	1,304	40.40
Republican	Jesse M. Mayo	203	6.3
Total votes		3,228	100.0
Turnout			
Democratic gain from Republican			

=== 1944 ===
1944 United States House of Representatives elections in California, 2nd district
Party	Candidate	Votes	%
Democratic	Clair Engle (incumbent)	48,201	63.8
Republican	Jesse M. Mayo	27,312	36.2
Total votes		75,513	100.0
Turnout			
Democratic hold			

=== 1946 ===
1946 United States House of Representatives elections in California, 2nd district
Party	Candidate	Votes	%
Democratic	Clair Engle (incumbent)	57,895	100.0
Turnout			
Democratic hold			

=== 1948 ===
1948 United States House of Representatives elections in California, 2nd district
Party	Candidate	Votes	%
Democratic	Clair Engle (incumbent)	78,555	100.0
Turnout			
Democratic hold			

=== 1950 ===
1950 United States House of Representatives elections in California, 2nd district
Party	Candidate	Votes	%
Democratic	Clair Engle (incumbent)	85,103	100.0
Turnout			
Democratic hold			

=== 1952 ===
1952 United States House of Representatives elections in California, 2nd district
Party	Candidate	Votes	%
Democratic	Clair Engle (incumbent)	124,179	100.0
Turnout			
Democratic hold			

=== 1954 ===
1954 United States House of Representatives elections in California, 2nd district
Party	Candidate	Votes	%
Democratic	Clair Engle (incumbent)	113,104	100.0
Turnout			
Democratic hold			

=== 1956 ===
1956 United States House of Representatives elections in California, 2nd district
Party	Candidate	Votes	%
Democratic	Clair Engle (incumbent)	136,544	100.0
Turnout			
Democratic hold			

=== 1958 ===
1958 United States House of Representatives elections in California, 2nd district
Party	Candidate	Votes	%
Democratic	Harold T. Johnson	90,850	61.0
Republican	Curtis W. Tarr	58,199	39.0
Total votes		149,049	100
Turnout			
Democratic hold			

=== 1960 ===
1960 United States House of Representatives elections in California, 2nd district
Party	Candidate	Votes	%
Democratic	Harold T. Johnson (incumbent)	109,565	62.7
Republican	Curtis W. Tarr	65,198	37.3
Total votes		174,763	100.0
Turnout			
Democratic hold			

=== 1962 ===
1962 United States House of Representatives elections in California, 2nd district
Party	Candidate	Votes	%
Democratic	Harold T. Johnson (incumbent)	106,239	64.6
Republican	Frederic H. Nagel	58,150	35.4
Total votes		164,389	100.0
Turnout			
Democratic hold			

=== 1964 ===
1964 United States House of Representatives elections in California, 2nd district
Party	Candidate	Votes	%
Democratic	Harold T. Johnson (incumbent)	125,774	64.6
Republican	Chester C. Merriam	68,835	35.4
Total votes		194,609	100.0
Turnout			
Democratic hold			

=== 1966 ===
1966 United States House of Representatives elections in California, 2nd district
Party	Candidate	Votes	%
Democratic	Harold T. Johnson (incumbent)	131,145	70.9
Republican	William H. Romack, Jr.	53,753	29.1
Total votes		184,898	100.0
Turnout			
Democratic hold			

=== 1968 ===
1968 United States House of Representatives elections in California, 2nd district
Party	Candidate	Votes	%
Democratic	Harold T. Johnson (incumbent)	127,880	60.8
Republican	Osmer E. Dunaway	78,986	37.5
American Independent	Paul J. Huft	3,577	1.7
Total votes		210,443	100.0
Turnout			
Democratic hold			

=== 1970 ===
1970 United States House of Representatives elections in California, 2nd district
Party	Candidate	Votes	%
Democratic	Harold T. Johnson (incumbent)	151,070	77.9
Republican	Lloyd E. Gilbert	37,223	19.2
American Independent	Jack R. Carrigg	5,681	2.9
Total votes		193,974	100.0
Turnout			
Democratic hold			

=== 1972 ===
1972 United States House of Representatives elections in California, 2nd district
Party	Candidate	Votes	%
Democratic	Harold T. Johnson (incumbent)	148,808	68.3
Republican	Francis X. Callahan	62,381	28.6
American Independent	Dorothy D. Paradis	6,688	3.1
Total votes		217,877	100.0
Turnout			
Democratic hold			

=== 1974 ===
1974 United States House of Representatives elections in California, 2nd district
Party	Candidate	Votes	%
Republican	Donald H. Clausen (incumbent)	95,508	53
Democratic	Oscar H. Klee	76,951	42.7
Peace and Freedom	Carole J. Glass	7,719	4.3
Total votes		180,178	100.0
Turnout			
Republican hold			

=== 1976 ===
1976 United States House of Representatives elections in California, 2nd district
Party	Candidate	Votes	%
Republican	Donald H. Clausen (incumbent)	121,290	56.0
Democratic	Oscar H. Klee	88,829	41.0
Peace and Freedom	Robert B. "Bob" Allred	6,444	3.0
Total votes		216,563	100
Turnout			
Republican hold			

=== 1978 ===
1978 United States House of Representatives elections in California, 2nd district
Party	Candidate	Votes	%
Republican	Donald H. Clausen (incumbent)	114,451	52.0
Democratic	Norma Bork	99,712	45.3
Peace and Freedom	Irv Sutley	6,097	2.8
Total votes		220,260	100.0
Turnout			
Republican hold			

=== 1980 ===
1980 United States House of Representatives elections in California, 2nd district
Party	Candidate	Votes	%
Republican	Donald H. Clausen (incumbent)	141,698	54.2
Democratic	Norma K. Bork	109,789	42.0
Libertarian	Daniel Mosier	6,833	2.6
Peace and Freedom	Linda D. Wren	3,354	1.3
Total votes		261,674	100.0
Turnout			
Republican hold			

=== 1982 ===
1982 United States House of Representatives elections in California, 2nd district
Party	Candidate	Votes	%
Republican	Eugene A. Chappie (incumbent)	116,172	57.9
Democratic	John Newmeyer	81,314	40.5
Peace and Freedom	Howard Fegarsky	3,126	1.6
Total votes		200,612	100.0
Turnout			
Republican hold			

=== 1984 ===
1984 United States House of Representatives elections in California, 2nd district
Party	Candidate	Votes	%
Republican	Eugene A. Chappie (incumbent)	158,679	69.5
Democratic	Harry Cozad	69,793	30.5
Total votes		228,472	100.0
Turnout			
Republican hold			

=== 1986 ===
1986 United States House of Representatives elections in California, 2nd district
Party	Candidate	Votes	%
Republican	Wally Herger	109,758	58.3
Democratic	Stephen C. Swendiman	74,602	39.6
Libertarian	Harry Hugh "Doc" Pendery	4,054	2.2
Total votes		188,414	100.0
Turnout			
Republican hold			

=== 1988 ===
1988 United States House of Representatives elections in California, 2nd district
Party	Candidate	Votes	%
Republican	Wally Herger (incumbent)	139,010	58.8
Democratic	Wayne R. Meyer	91,088	38.5
Libertarian	Harry Hugh "Doc" Pendery	6,253	2.6
Total votes		236,351	100.0
Turnout			
Republican hold			

=== 1990 ===
1990 United States House of Representatives elections in California, 2nd district
Party	Candidate	Votes	%
Republican	Wally Herger (incumbent)	133,315	63.7
Democratic	Erwin E. "Bill" Rush	65,333	31.2
Libertarian	Ross Crain	10,753	5.1
Total votes		209,401	100.0
Turnout			
Republican hold			

=== 1992 ===
1992 United States House of Representatives elections in California, 2nd district
Party	Candidate	Votes	%
Republican	Wally Herger (incumbent)	167,247	65.2
Democratic	Elliot Roy Freedman	71,780	28.0
Libertarian	Harry H. "Doc" Pendery	17,529	6.8
Total votes		256,556	100.0
Turnout			
Republican hold			

=== 1994 ===
1994 United States House of Representatives elections in California, 2nd district
Party	Candidate	Votes	%
Republican	Wally Herger (incumbent)	137,864	64.2
Democratic	Mary Jacobs	55,959	26
American Independent	Devvy Kidd	15,619	7.3
Libertarian	Harry H. "Doc" Pendery	5,418	2.5
Total votes		214,860	100.0
Turnout			
Republican hold			

=== 1996 ===
1996 United States House of Representatives elections in California, 2nd district
Party	Candidate	Votes	%
Republican	Wally Herger (incumbent)	144,913	60.9
Democratic	Roberts Braden	80,401	33.7
Natural Law	Patrice Thiessen	7,253	3.0
Libertarian	William Brunner	5,759	2.4
Republican	Bob Todd (write-in)	7	0.0
Total votes		238,333	100.0
Turnout			
Republican hold			

=== 1998 ===
1998 United States House of Representatives elections in California, 2nd district
Party	Candidate	Votes	%
Republican	Wally Herger (incumbent)	128,372	62.5
Democratic	Roberts "Rob" Braden	70,837	34.5
Natural Law	Patrice Thiessen	6,138	3
Democratic	Stephen F. Scott (write-in)	20	0.01
Total votes		205,367	100.0
Turnout			
Republican hold			

=== 2000 ===
2000 United States House of Representatives elections in California, 2nd district
Party	Candidate	Votes	%
Republican	Wally Herger (incumbent)	168,172	65.8
Democratic	Stan Morgan	72,075	28.2
Natural Law	John McDermott	8,910	3.4
Libertarian	Charles R. Martin	6,699	2.6
Total votes		255,856	100.0
Turnout			
Republican hold			

=== 2002 ===
2002 United States House of Representatives elections in California, 2nd district
Party	Candidate	Votes	%
Republican	Wally Herger (incumbent)	117,747	65.8
Democratic	Mike Johnson	52,455	29.4
Natural Law	Patrice Thiessen	4,860	2.7
Libertarian	Charles R. Martin	3,923	2.1
Total votes		178,985	100.0
Turnout			
Republican hold			

=== 2004 ===
2004 United States House of Representatives elections in California, 2nd district
Party	Candidate	Votes	%
Republican	Wally Herger (incumbent)	182,119	66.9
Democratic	Mike Johnson	90,310	33.1
Total votes		272,429	100.0
Turnout			
Republican hold			

=== 2006 ===
2006 United States House of Representatives elections in California, 2nd district
Party	Candidate	Votes	%
Republican	Wally Herger (incumbent)	134,911	64.2
Democratic	Arjinderpal Sekhon	68,234	32.5
Libertarian	E. Kent Hinesley	7,057	3.3
Total votes		210,202	100.0
Turnout			
Republican hold			

=== 2008 ===
2008 United States House of Representatives elections in California, 2nd district
Party	Candidate	Votes	%
Republican	Wally Herger (incumbent)	163,459	57.9
Democratic	Jeff Morris	118,878	42.1
Total votes		228,356	100.00
Turnout			
Republican hold			

=== 2010 ===
2010 United States House of Representatives elections in California, 2nd district
Party	Candidate	Votes	%
Republican	Wally Herger (incumbent)	129,984	57.1
Democratic	Jim Reed	97,514	42.9%
Total votes		227,498	100
Republican hold			

=== 2012 ===
2012 United States House of Representatives elections in California, 2nd district
Party	Candidate	Votes	%
Democratic	Jared Huffman	226,216	71.2
Republican	Daniel W. Roberts	91,310	28.8
Total votes		317,526	100.0
Democratic hold			

=== 2014 ===
2014 United States House of Representatives elections in California, 2nd district
Party	Candidate	Votes	%
Democratic	Jared Huffman (incumbent)	163,124	75.0
Republican	Dale K Mensing	54,400	25.0
Total votes		217,524	100.0
Democratic hold			

=== 2016 ===
2016 United States House of Representatives elections in California, 2nd district
Party	Candidate	Votes	%
Democratic	Jared Huffman (incumbent)	254,194	76.9
Republican	Dale K Mensing	76,572	23.1
Total votes		330,766	100.0
Democratic hold			

=== 2018 ===
2018 United States House of Representatives elections in California, 2nd district
Party	Candidate	Votes	%
Democratic	Jared Huffman (incumbent)	243,081	77.0
Republican	Dale K. Mensing	72,576	23.0
Total votes		315,657	100.0
Turnout			
Democratic hold			

=== 2020 ===
2020 United States House of Representatives elections in California
Party	Candidate	Votes	%
Democratic	Jared Huffman (incumbent)	294,435	75.7
Republican	Dale K. Mensing	94,320	24.3
Total votes		388,755	100.0
Democratic hold			

=== 2022 ===
2022 United States House of Representatives elections in California
Party	Candidate	Votes	%
Democratic	Jared Huffman (incumbent)	229,720	74.4
Republican	Douglas Brower	79,029	25.6
Total votes		308,749	100.0
Democratic hold			

=== 2024 ===
2024 United States House of Representatives elections in California
Party	Candidate	Votes	%
Democratic	Jared Huffman (incumbent)	272,883	71.9
Republican	Chris Coulombe	106,734	28.1
Total votes		379,617	100.0
Democratic hold			

== See also ==
- List of United States congressional districts
- California's congressional districts
