= 1926 United States House of Representatives elections in California =

United States House of Representatives elections in California, 1926
- November 2, 1926

All 11 California seats to the United States House of Representatives
	Majority party	Minority party
Party	Republican	Democratic
Last election	9	2
Seats before	10	1
Seats won	10	1
Seat change	Steady	Steady
Popular vote	752,546	107,253
Percentage	78.8%	11.2%
- Republican hold Democratic hold

The United States House of Representatives elections in California, 1926 was an election for California's delegation to the United States House of Representatives, which occurred as part of the general election of the House of Representatives on November 2, 1926. Republicans gained one seat in a special election held on August 31, 1926, after incumbent Democrat John E. Raker died.

== Overview ==
United States House of Representatives elections in California, 1926
Party	Votes	Percentage	Seats	+/–
Republican	752,546	78.8%	10	+1
Democratic	107,253	11.2%	1	-1
Prohibition	61,719	6.5%	0	0
Socialist	32,900	3.4%	0	0
Totals	954,418	100.0%	11	—

== Delegation Composition ==
Pre-election	Seats
Republican-Held	9
Democratic-Held	2

Post-election	Seats
Republican-Held	10
Democratic-Held	1

== Results ==
Final results from the Clerk of the House of Representatives:

=== District 1 ===
California's 1st congressional district election, 1926
Party	Candidate	Votes	%
Democratic	Clarence F. Lea (incumbent)	60,207	100.0
Turnout			
Democratic hold			

=== District 2 ===
California's 2nd congressional district election, 1926
Party	Candidate	Votes	%
Republican	Harry Lane Englebright (incumbent)	32,264	100.0
Turnout			
Republican hold			

=== District 3 ===
California's 3rd congressional district election, 1926
Party	Candidate	Votes	%
Republican	Charles F. Curry (incumbent)	72,912	100.0
Turnout			
Republican hold			

=== District 4 ===
California's 4th congressional district election, 1926
Party	Candidate	Votes	%
Republican	Florence Prag Kahn (incumbent)	37,353	63.4
Democratic	Chauncey F. Tramutulo	18,210	32.5
Socialist	Harry W. Hutton	2,960	5.1
Total votes		58,523	100.0
Turnout			
Republican hold			

=== District 5 ===
California's 5th congressional district election, 1926
Party	Candidate	Votes	%
Republican	Richard J. Welch (incumbent)	47,694	100.0
Turnout			
Republican hold			

=== District 6 ===
California's 6th congressional district election, 1926
Party	Candidate	Votes	%
Republican	Albert E. Carter (incumbent)	91,995	100.0
Turnout			
Republican hold			

=== District 7 ===
California's 7th congressional district election, 1926
Party	Candidate	Votes	%
Republican	Henry E. Barbour (incumbent)	73,271	100.0
Turnout			
Republican hold			

=== District 8 ===
California's 8th congressional district election, 1926
Party	Candidate	Votes	%
Republican	Arthur M. Free (incumbent)	60,384	67.7
Democratic	Philip G. Sheehy	28,836	32.3
Total votes		89,220	100.0
Turnout			
Republican hold			

=== District 9 ===
California's 9th congressional district election, 1926
Party	Candidate	Votes	%
Republican	William E. Evans (incumbent)	102,270	59.5
Prohibition	Charles H. Randall	61,719	35.9
Socialist	Charles F. Conley	7,943	4.6
Total votes		171,932	100.0
Turnout			
Republican hold			

=== District 10 ===
California's 10th congressional district election, 1926
Party	Candidate	Votes	%
Republican	Joe Crail (incumbent)	144,677	93.9
Socialist	N. Jackson Wright	21,997	13.2
Total votes		166,674	100.0
Turnout			
Republican hold			

=== District 11 ===
California's 11th congressional district election, 1926
Party	Candidate	Votes	%
Republican	Philip D. Swing (incumbent)	89,726	100.0
Turnout			
Republican hold			

== See also ==
- 70th United States Congress
- Political party strength in California
- Political party strength in U.S. states
- 1926 United States House of Representatives elections
