= Harry L. Englebright =

American politician (1884–1943)

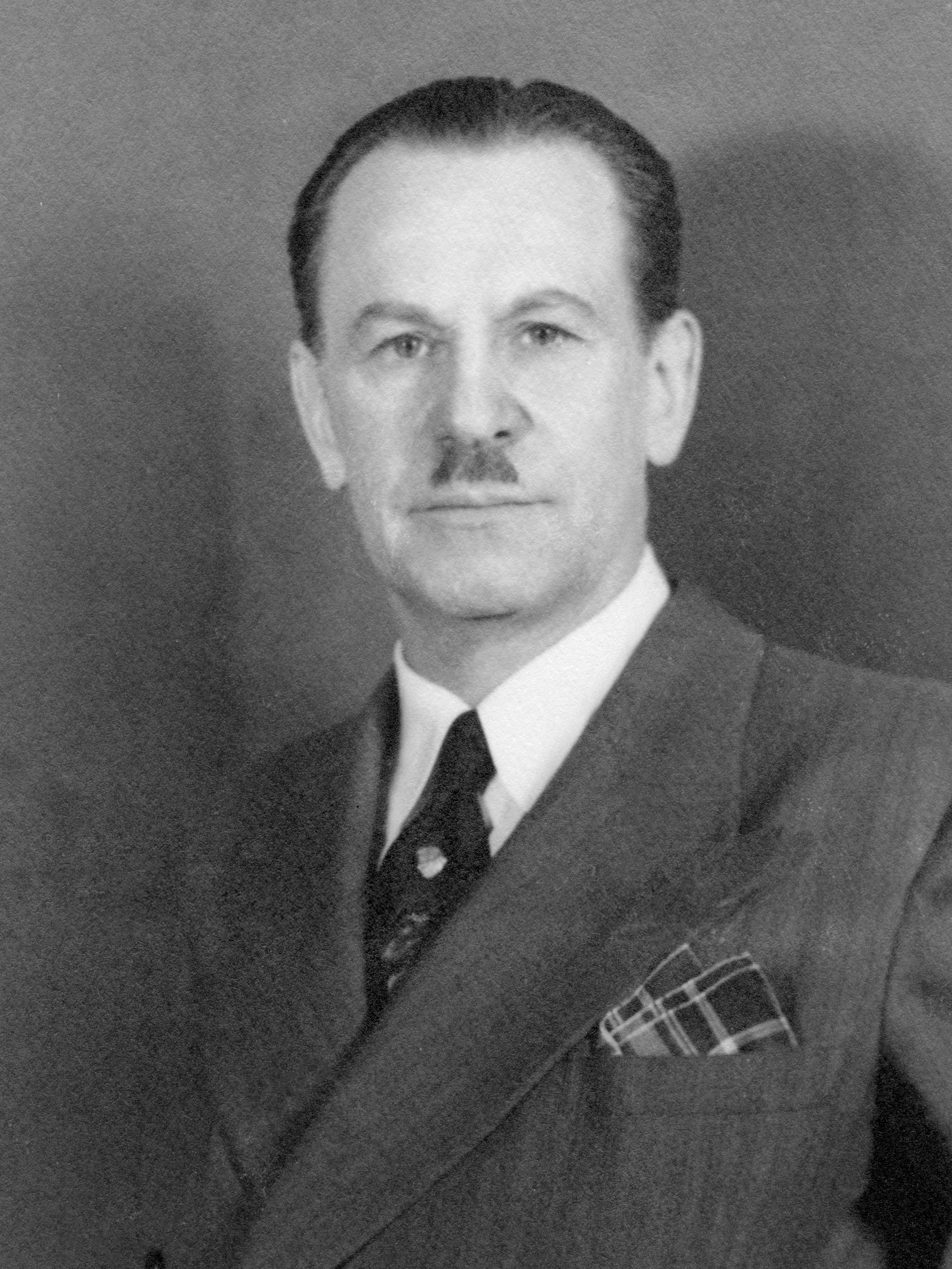
- Englebright c. 1935–1943

House Minority Whip
- In office March 4, 1933 – May 13, 1943
- Leader: Bertrand Snell; Joseph W. Martin Jr.
- Preceded by: Carl G. Bachmann
- Succeeded by: Leslie C. Arends

Member of the U.S. House of Representatives from California's 2nd district
- In office August 31, 1926 – May 13, 1943
- Preceded by: John E. Raker
- Succeeded by: Clair Engle

Personal details
- Born: Harry Lane Englebright; January 2, 1884 Nevada City, California, U.S.
- Died: May 13, 1943 (aged 59) Bethesda, Maryland, U.S.
- Party: Republican
- Parent: William F. Englebright
- Education: University of California, Berkeley
- Occupation: Politician, Mining engineer

Harry Lane Englebright (January 2, 1884 – May 13, 1943) was an American mining executive and politician who represented California's 2nd congressional district from 1926 to 1943. He rose to the level of House Minority Whip, serving in that role from 1933 to 1943.

== Biography ==
Englebright was born in Nevada City, California. His father, William F. Englebright, also served in the United States House of Representatives.

=== Mining ===
Harry Englebright attended the University of California, Berkeley and became a mining engineer before entering politics; he was connected with various mining enterprises in California and was an engineer for the State Conservation Commission from 1911 to 1914.

=== Congress ===
Englebright was elected to the House of Representatives in a special election in 1926, following the death of Congressman John E. Raker. His district was located in the far north of California, north of Sacramento. A Republican, he was elected to a full term later in 1926 and was re-elected until his death in 1943 in Bethesda, Maryland.

== Legacy ==
Englebright Lake in Northern California is named for him.

== Electoral history ==
Harry Englebright electoral history

August 31, 1926 special election
Party	Candidate	Votes	%
Republican	Harry Lane Englebright	11,462	26.0
Republican	Frank J Powers	10,237	23.2
Republican	Ferdinand G. Stevenot	8,763	19.9
Republican	Marshall De Motte	8,001	18.2
Democratic	Robert H De Witt	5,572	12.7
Total votes		44,035	100.0
Turnout			
Republican gain from Democratic			

1926 United States House of Representatives elections in California, 2nd district
Party	Candidate	Votes	%
Republican	Harry Lane Englebright (incumbent)	32,264	100.0
Turnout			
Republican gain from Democratic			

1928 United States House of Representatives elections in California, 2nd district
Party	Candidate	Votes	%
Republican	Harry Lane Englebright (incumbent)	32,455	100.0
Turnout			
Republican hold			

1930 United States House of Representatives elections in California, 2nd district
Party	Candidate	Votes	%
Republican	Harry Lane Englebright (incumbent)	35,941	100.0
Turnout			
Republican hold			

1932 United States House of Representatives elections in California, 2nd district
Party	Candidate	Votes	%
Republican	Harry Lane Englebright (incumbent)	43,146	100.0
Turnout			
Republican hold			

1934 United States House of Representatives elections in California, 2nd district
Party	Candidate	Votes	%
Republican	Harry Lane Englebright (incumbent)	66,370	100.0
Turnout			
Republican hold			

1936 United States House of Representatives elections in California, 2nd district
Party	Candidate	Votes	%
Republican	Harry Lane Englebright (incumbent)	51,416	100.0
Turnout			
Republican hold			

1938 United States House of Representatives elections in California, 2nd district
Party	Candidate	Votes	%
Republican	Harry Lane Englebright (incumbent)	71,496	100.0
Turnout			
Republican hold			

1940 United States House of Representatives elections in California, 2nd district
Party	Candidate	Votes	%
Republican	Harry Lane Englebright (incumbent)	71,033	100.0
Turnout			
Republican hold			

1942 United States House of Representatives elections in California, 2nd district
Party	Candidate	Votes	%
Republican	Harry Lane Englebright (incumbent)	50,094	100.0
Turnout			
Republican hold			

== See also ==
- List of members of the United States Congress who died in office (1900–1949)

U.S. House of Representatives
Preceded by John E. Raker	Member of the U.S. House of Representatives from California's 2nd congressional district 1926–1943	Succeeded by Clair Engle
Political offices
Preceded by Carl G. Bachmann	House Minority Whip; House Republican Whip; 1933–1943	Succeeded by Leslie C. Arends
