= William F. Englebright =

American politician

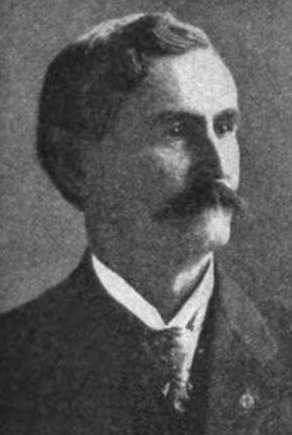

Member of the U.S. House of Representatives from California's 1st district
- In office November 6, 1906 – March 3, 1911
- Preceded by: James Gillett
- Succeeded by: John E. Raker

Personal details
- Born: William Fellows Englebrght; November 23, 1855 New Bedford, Massachusetts
- Died: February 10, 1915 (aged 59) Oakland, California
- Resting place: Pine Grove Cemetery in Nevada City, California
- Party: Republican
- Children: Harry L. Englebright
- Occupation: Mining Engineer

William Fellows Englebright (November 23, 1855 – February 10, 1915) was an American miner and politician who served three terms as a U.S. representative from California from 1906 to 1911. He was the father of Representative Harry Lane Englebright.

== Biography ==
Born in New Bedford, Massachusetts, Englebright moved with his parents to Vallejo, California. He attended private and public schools and first began serving the United States as a joiner's apprentice at Mare Island Naval Shipyard. After he completed his studies in engineering he established himself in Nevada City, California as a mining engineer where he also served as a member of the Nevada City Board of Education.

=== Congress ===
Englebright was elected as a Republican to the Fifty-ninth Congress to fill the vacancy caused by the resignation of James N. Gillett. In Congress he served on the House Irrigation of Arid Lands committee, the House Mines and Mining committee, and the House Naval Affairs committee.

He was reelected to the Sixtieth and Sixty-first Congresses and served from November 6, 1906, until his defeat in the 1910 election, leaving office on March 3, 1911.

=== Later career ===
After his political career, he resumed his occupation as a mining engineer.

=== Death and burial ===
Englebright died in Oakland, California on February 10, 1915, and was interred at Pine Grove Cemetery in Nevada City, California.

U.S. House of Representatives
| Preceded by James N. Gillett | Member of the U.S. House of Representatives from California's 1st congressional district 1906–1911 | Succeeded by John E. Raker |
