= Monroe District (Santa Rosa, California) =

Area in western Santa Rosa, California

The Monroe District is an area in western Santa Rosa, California, which has been recognized since at least 1870. It was named for the Monroe family, early residents of the area. Some of the early homes were built of wood brought in by Jim McReynolds as early as 1854.

== Boundaries ==
The 1929 Monroe Third Road District was roughly bounded by Piner Road on the north, the railroad tracks to the east, Santa Rosa Creek to the south and Fulton Road to the west.

The modern Monroe District continues to be centered around the intersection of Guerneville Road and Marlow Road. 38.452542°N 122.751344°W

== Community ==
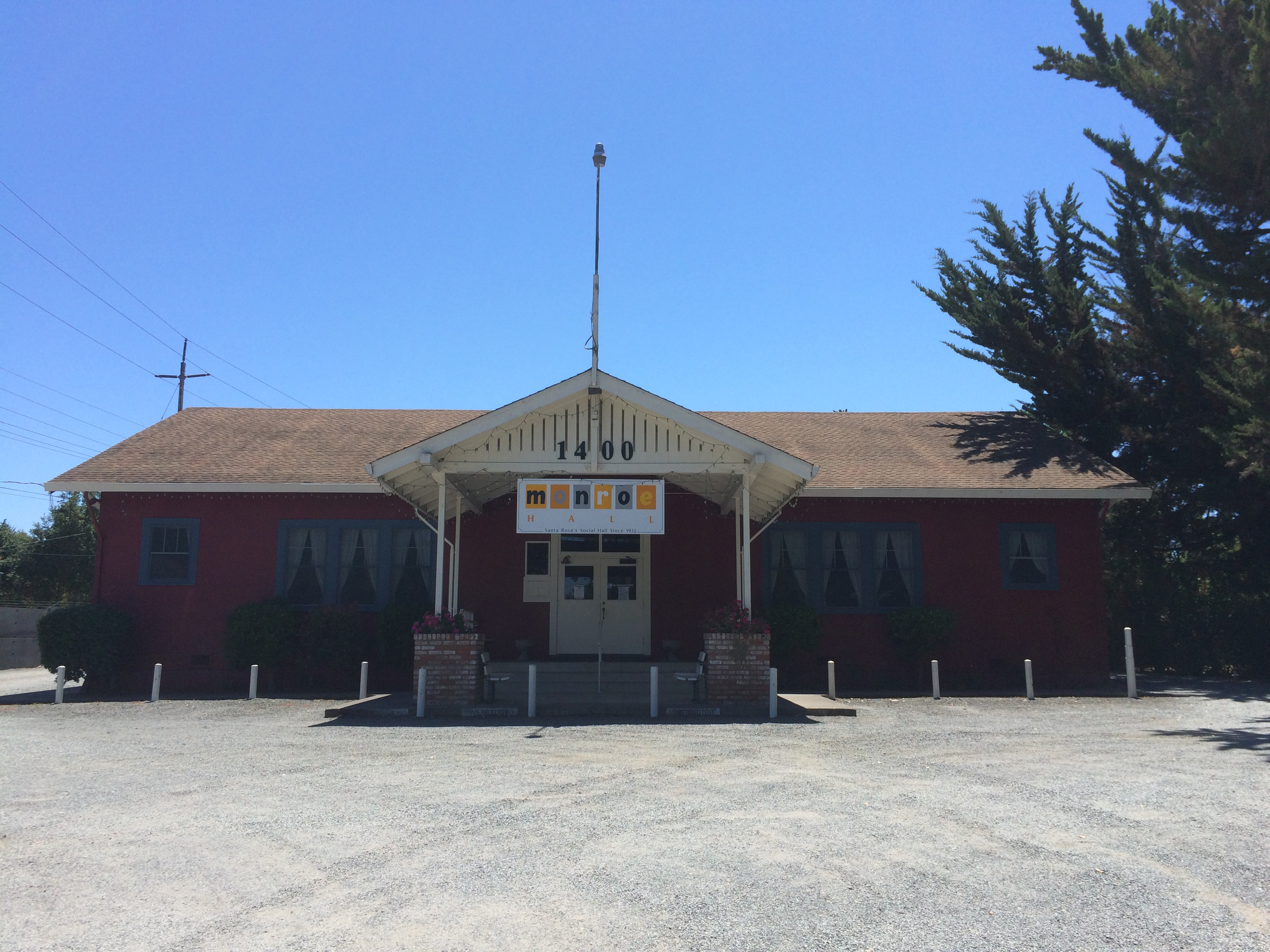
Monroe Hall looking south, College Avenue, Santa Rosa, CA (2020)

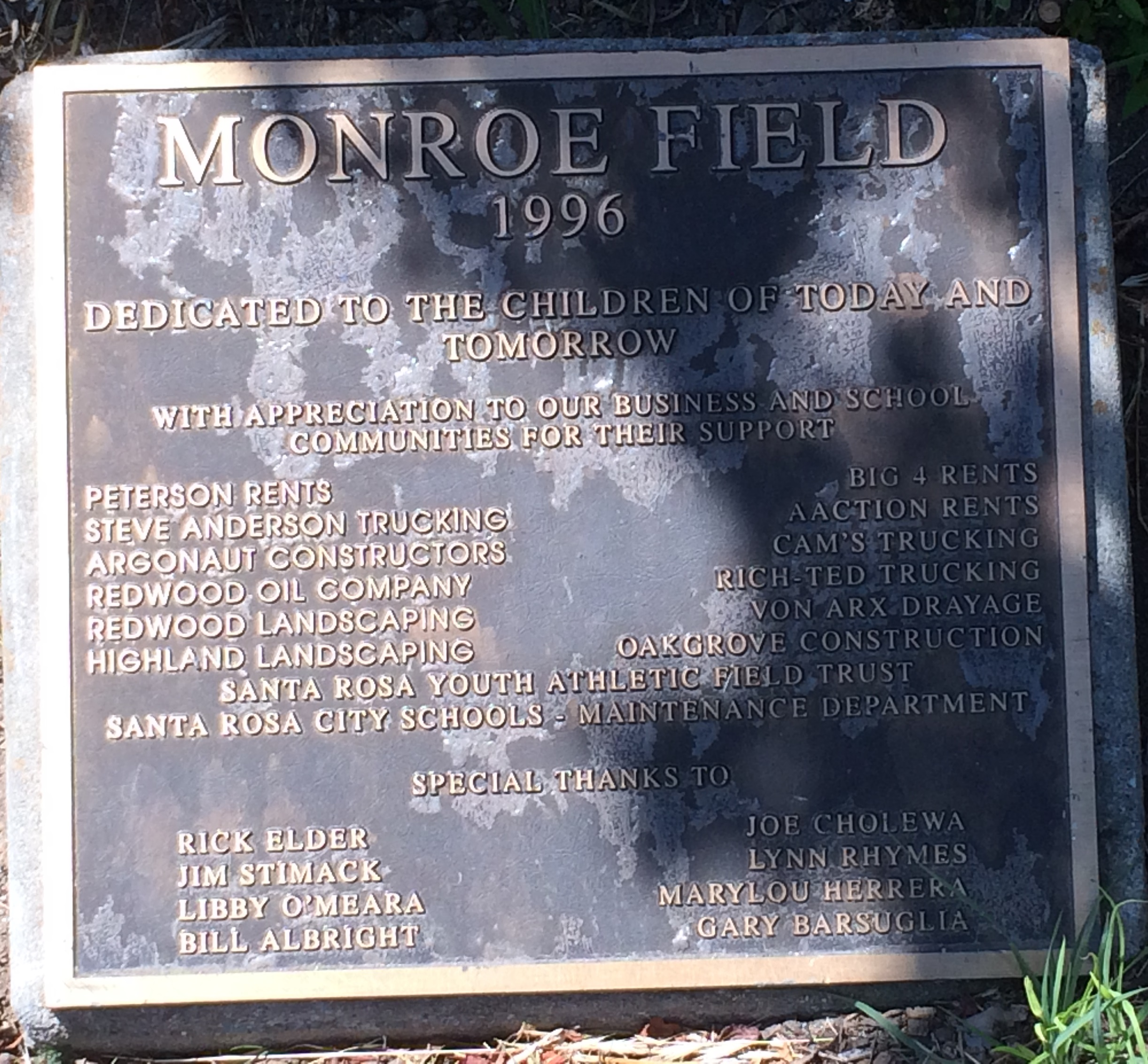
Plaque for Monroe Field, Monroe District, Santa Rosa, 1996

The community has been a thriving one. There was a Monroe 4-H Club, the Monroe Women's Club, the Monroe Neighborhood Club also known as the Monroe Club (started 1915), the Piner-Monroe Ag Club, the Piner-Monroe Sunday School, the Hall-Monroe Club and others. The Monroe Clubhouse opened October 21, 1922. Twice a month dances were held there starting in 1922; a new maple dance floor was laid in 1947 and is still used for dance functions. It remains in service in 2020 as Monroe Hall on College Avenue, where many events are held each week.38.444829°N 122.743853°W

The Monroe Market was at 2007 Guerneville Road.

The Monroe district was the home of Louis Lagomarsino, an elderly rancher who was the Communist candidate for state assembly in 1934. In 1935, he was a supporter of raising the wages of fruit pickers from 25 cents per hour to 40 cents per hour. Lagomarsino and other labor reformers were attacked by grower vigilantes. While the vigilantes escaped justice, the treatment of pickers became widely known, pickers refused to come to Sonoma County and a labor shortage developed. Growers then had to raise wages to attract workers.

When community members created new soccer and softball fields behind Monroe Elementary School, the fields were named Monroe Field rather than being named after the volunteers.

The area shows on maps from at least 1877.

== Elementary school ==
The Monroe District School was established as a kindergarten through 8th grade school prior to 1870. The first school was built of wood brought in by Jim McReynolds as early as 1854.

In 1870, the Monroe District School's apportionment was $67.60 from the state plus $10.85 for the library.

The school is documented receiving a state allocation in 1871, 1874, 1875, and 1876.

In the summer of 1874, it was reported that there were 25 children between ages of 5 and 17 in the district. 24 of them had attended school in the prior year.

Although the Monroe District voters defeated a bond proposal in August 1920, the next year, the Sonoma County Board of Supervisors released $12,000 of bonds to build the school.

In 1921, the district built a two-room school on the southwest corner of Guerneville Road and Marlow Road. The school was designed to hold 30 to 35 students.

The state fire marshal found the use of the stage for teaching the 2nd and 3rd grades to be unsafe. The Santa Rosa City Schools agreed to take the school's 7th and 8th graders. Since then, the school has been a kindergarten through 6th grade school.

In the 1948–1949 time frame, there were efforts to merge (unionize) the Hall, Piner, Monroe and Wright districts.

In December 1950, the County Clerk certified a petition from the voters in the Monroe District. More than 50% of the signatures (of 123) were valid, and that represented a majority of the voters in the district. The petition supported the annexation of the Monroe District School into the Santa Rosa City Schools.

In 1950, the district was annexed into the Santa Rosa City Schools (SRCS). The combination was effective July 1, 1951.

In 1960, the SRCS passed its school bond election. The SRCS then developed plans for a new Monroe School.

The SRCS acquired a 10 and 1/2 acre parcel, 1/4 mile north of the old school on Marlow Road.

On April 19, 1960, a bid of $256,440 was approved to build the new school. Construction began in August of the same year.

In September 1960, Monroe School opened with double sessions at the old school. When the new school opened around October, the double sessions ended.

In 1962, the SRCS sold off the old eight-acre property. It has since been turned into a Safeway grocery store and a small strip mall.

In early 1984, the SRCS Board added the name "James" to the school, apparently without determining if this was accurate. A 1996 article by Gaye Lebaron in The Press Democrat indicated that then-outgoing SRCS board member Cynthia Zieber had been on a "crusade" to make sure all schools in the district were named after people. Several schools had the first name of the school's namesake added during her tenure. LeBaron states in the article that Zieber "worries a little about that James Monroe Elementary since the school was annexed to the Santa Rosa district as the only school in what was known as the Monroe District with no indication that U.S. President James Monroe had anything to do with the name."

In 2020, school board member Omar Medina proposed an emergency action immediately changing the name of the school to remove the objectionable James Monroe to George Ortiz. The board moved to postpone the action in favor of focusing on the COVID-19 emergency. In February 2021, the school sought volunteers for a name-change committee and sought the submission of proposed new names. Former SRCS director Cynthia Zieber posted that her work to add the "James" to the school name in 1984 was "a mistake." On May 26, 2021, the board heard the committee's report which showed the overwhelming support of all constituencies to revert the name back to "Monroe Elementary School." The board voted on the motion to rename the school George Ortiz Elementary School, rejecting the proposal on a 4-to-3 vote. The board indicated that the matter would be held open for another year to allow further consideration of the George Ortiz name.

In March 2024, Medina, as chair of the board and facing a recall effort related to school safety, put the name change back on the school board agenda. The board agreed to a multi-year process to evaluate new school names to be led by trustees Alegria de la Cruz and Roxanne McNally.
